= 2023 FIBA Women's AfroBasket squads =

This article displays the rosters for the teams competing at the 2023 Women's AfroBasket. Each team had to submit 12 players.

== Group A ==
=== Angola ===
The roster was announced on 28 July 2023.

Angola women's national basketball team roster
Players
Coaches

Pos.	No.	Name	Age – Date of birth	Height	Club	Ctr.
SF	3	Edvania Pascoal	24 – 1 July 1999	1.72 m (5 ft 8 in)	Interclube	(Angola)
PG	4	Artémis Barbosa	30 – 6 January 1993	1.83 m (6 ft 0 in)	Castelló	(Spain)
PF	5	Joana António	26 – 11 June 1997	1.90 m (6 ft 3 in)	Interclube	(Angola)
G	6	Isabel Fernando	23 – 5 June 2000	1.68 m (5 ft 6 in)	Primeiro de Agosto	(Angola)
SG	7	Arminda Joaquim	17 – 26 February 2006	1.82 m (6 ft 0 in)	Primeiro de Agosto	(Angola)
SF	8	Sara Caetano	19 – 9 September 2003	1.72 m (5 ft 8 in)	Formigas do Cazenga	(Angola)
SF	11	Isabel João	19 – 31 May 2004	1.83 m (6 ft 0 in)	Primeiro de Agosto	(Angola)
G	12	Nelma Cunha	21 – 27 February 2002	1.78 m (5 ft 10 in)
PF	14	Nadir Manuel	36 – 30 November 1986	1.86 m (6 ft 1 in)	Interclube	(Angola)
PF	15	Jessica Malagi	25 – 17 December 1997	1.84 m (6 ft 0 in)	Interclube	(Angola)
C	20	Cristina Matiquite	31 – 12 March 1992	1.91 m (6 ft 3 in)	Interclube	(Angola)
PG	23	Cacia Antonio	22 – 6 May 2001	1.78 m (5 ft 10 in)	Interclube	(Angola)

Head coach

- (Angola) José Villa

Assistant coach(es)

- (Angola) João Formosa
- (Angola) Elisa Pires

Legend

- Club – describes last
  club before the tournament
- Age – describes age
  on 28 July 2023

=== Ivory Coast ===
Ivory Coast women's national basketball team roster
Players
Coaches

Pos.	No.	Name	Age – Date of birth	Height	Club	Ctr.
	0	Alima Doumbia	20 – 31 August 2002
PG	4	Safiétou Kolga	26 – 27 March 1997	1.67 m (5 ft 6 in)	CSA Treichville	(Ivory Coast)
PG	5	Hanna Amani	27 – 11 April 1996	1.66 m (5 ft 5 in)	CSA Treichville	(Ivory Coast)
PF	6	Amma Ouraga	23 – 6 December 1999	1.89 m (6 ft 2 in)	Friend's Basketball Association	(Ivory Coast)
F	7	Djefarina Diawara	28 – 13 September 1994	1.80 m (5 ft 11 in)	Porte du Hainaut	(France)
PF	9	Edwige Djedjemel	34 – 29 October 1988	1.88 m (6 ft 2 in)	CSA Treichville	(Ivory Coast)
G	10	Abiba Kone	25 – 26 June 1998	1.76 m (5 ft 9 in)	CSA Treichville	(Ivory Coast)
	11	Mariam Fofana	26 – 18 February 1997
SG	12	Iréne Bognini	26 – 5 April 1997	1.78 m (5 ft 10 in)	CSA Treichville	(Ivory Coast)
	17	Grace Tolo	22 – 3 January 2001
	23	Aminata Guindo	23 – 22 April 2000
G	24	N'Bionewe Sieza	26 – 24 May 1997	1.90 m (6 ft 3 in)	SOA	(Ivory Coast)

Head coach

- (Serbia) Zoran Višić

Assistant coach(es)

- (France) Krissy Badé
- (Ivory Coast) Agricola Kouakou

Legend

- Club – describes last
  club before the tournament
- Age – describes age
  on 28 July 2023

=== Rwanda ===
The roster was announced on 28 July 2023.

Rwanda women's national basketball team roster
Players
Coaches

Pos.	No.	Name	Age – Date of birth	Height	Club	Ctr.
PF	0	Assouma Uwizeye	27 – 6 April 1996	1.82 m (6 ft 0 in)	APR BBC	(Rwanda)
PG	1	Odile Tetero	25 – 24 February 1998	1.62 m (5 ft 4 in)	APR BBC	(Rwanda)
	3	Destiney Philoxy	22 – 25 October 2000
	5	Janai Crooms	24 – 23 June 1999
F	7	Chantal Kiyobe	23 – 1 January 2000	1.70 m (5 ft 7 in)	REG BBC	(Rwanda)
	8	Ineza Sifa	21 – 14 March 2002
SG	9	Sandra Kantore	30 – 25 June 1993	1.74 m (5 ft 9 in)	REG BBC	(Rwanda)
	10	Hope Butera	22 – 10 February 2001
C	15	Charlotte Umugwaneza	38 – 24 November 1984	1.95 m (6 ft 5 in)	APR BBC	(Rwanda)
	20	Céline de Roy	28 – 31 July 1994		Riva Basket	(Rwanda)
SG	23	Marie Imanizabayo	26 – 12 December 1996	1.70 m (5 ft 7 in)	APR BBC	(Rwanda)
	77	Soiffa Wibabara	28 – 15 January 1995		Basket Ball Brunehaut	(France)

Head coach

- (Senegal) Cheikh Sarr

Assistant coach(es)

- (Rwanda) Patrick Habiyambere
- (Rwanda) Naci Ndayishimiye

Legend

- Club – describes last
  club before the competition
- Age – describes age
  on 28 July 2023

== Group B ==
=== Cameroon ===
The roster was announced on 26 July 2023.

Cameroon women's national basketball team roster
Players
Coaches

Pos.	No.	Name	Age – Date of birth	Height	Club	Ctr.
G	3	Jessica Thomas	28 – 27 October 1994	1.68 m (5 ft 6 in)	Nesibe Aydın	(Turkey)
PG	5	Raissa Mogoun	30 – 17 June 1993	1.67 m (5 ft 6 in)	University of Douala	(Cameroon)
G	6	Baleta Mukoko	31 – 6 January 1992	1.64 m (5 ft 5 in)	Le Havre	(France)
G	8	Monique Akoa	22 – 4 February 2001	1.80 m (5 ft 11 in)	Charnay Bourgogne	(France)
SG	10	Merveille Nkoyock	22 – 1 February 2001	1.74 m (5 ft 9 in)
F	13	Marguerite Effa	26 – 18 January 1997	1.91 m (6 ft 3 in)	PAS Giannina	(Greece)
F	14	Marina Ewodo	25 – 24 June 1998	1.85 m (6 ft 1 in)	PAS Giannina	(Greece)
C	22	Laura Dimithe	31 – 6 June 1992	1.90 m (6 ft 3 in)	USBD Alençon	(France)
F	23	Carina Silatsa	25 – 28 April 1998	1.86 m (6 ft 1 in)	Overdose Up Station	(Cameroon)
F	31	Quinta Kinyuy	26 – 21 July 1997	1.77 m (5 ft 10 in)	FAP Basketball	(Cameroon)
C	35	Sofilia Ngwafang	25 – 9 February 1998	1.93 m (6 ft 4 in)	Stade Rochelais Basket	(France)
C	99	Hermine Ngueko	31 – 11 July 1992	1.93 m (6 ft 4 in)	Toulouse Métropole Basket	(France)

Head coach

- (Cameroon) Ahmed Mbombo

Assistant coach(es)

- (Italy) Stefano Bizzozi

Legend

- Club – describes last
  club before the tournament
- Age – describes age
  on 28 July 2023

=== Guinea ===
Guinea women's national basketball team roster
Players
Coaches

Pos.	No.	Name	Age – Date of birth	Height	Club	Ctr.
SG	1	Fatoumata Jallow	26 – 16 April 1997	1.70 m (5 ft 7 in)	Alviks BK	(Sweden)
SG	2	Nana Souman	17 – 11 September 2005	1.75 m (5 ft 9 in)	Centre Fédéral	(France)
PG	3	Khady Mbaye	41 – 6 November 1981	1.69 m (5 ft 7 in)	Guediawaye Basket	(Senegal)
SG	4	Aicha Mara	27 – 24 January 1996	1.80 m (5 ft 11 in)	Monaco	(France)
PF	5	Masseny Kaba	24 – 15 December 1998	1.91 m (6 ft 3 in)	UF Angers	(France)
PG	6	Fanta Soumah	26 – 16 March 1997	1.65 m (5 ft 5 in)	Monaco	(France)
F	7	Fatima Sacko	25 – 19 April 1998	1.75 m (5 ft 9 in)	SLAC	(Guinea)
	8	Kadiatou Camara	29 – 28 December 1993	1.70 m (5 ft 7 in)	Horoya AC	(Guinea)
F	9	Salematou Sylla	20 – 16 February 2003	1.80 m (5 ft 11 in)	SLAC	(Guinea)
C	10	Mariama Diallo	35 – 14 November 1987	1.85 m (6 ft 1 in)	ASFO Basket	(Senegal)
C	11	Nafisatou Diack	18 – 11 November 2004	1.80 m (5 ft 11 in)	Centre Fédéral	(France)
F	12	Fatou Bah	38 – 16 July 1985	1.88 m (6 ft 2 in)	IAM Mermoz	(Senegal)

Head coach

- (Guinea) Ousmane Camara

Assistant coach(es)

- (Guinea) Abdoulaye Barry

Legend

- Club – describes last
  club before the tournament
- Age – describes age
  on 28 July 2023

=== Mozambique ===
Mozambique women's national basketball team roster
Players
Coaches

Pos.	No.	Name	Age – Date of birth	Height	Club	Ctr.
F	4	Shelsea Rafael	24 – 4 June 1999	1.71 m (5 ft 7 in)	Costa do Sol	(Mozambique)
C	5	Nilza Chiziane	31 – 27 February 1992	1.88 m (6 ft 2 in)	Costa do Sol	(Mozambique)
F	6	Ingvild Mucauro	30 – 12 September 1992	1.78 m (5 ft 10 in)	Costa do Sol	(Mozambique)
SG	7	Silvia Veloso	24 – 18 October 1998	1.72 m (5 ft 8 in)	Ferroviário de Maputo	(Mozambique)
PG	8	Delma Zita	25 – 27 March 1998	1.72 m (5 ft 8 in)	Ferroviário de Maputo	(Mozambique)
C	9	Dulce Mabjaia	34 – 5 November 1988	1.65 m (5 ft 5 in)	Ferroviário de Maputo	(Mozambique)
F	10	Chanaya Pinto	23 – 26 June 2000	1.85 m (6 ft 1 in)	CRC Quinta dos Lombos	(Portugal)
PF	11	Leia Dongue	32 – 24 May 1991	1.85 m (6 ft 1 in)	Landerneau Bretagne Basket	(France)
C	14	Odélia Mafanela	34 – 14 April 1989	1.81 m (5 ft 11 in)	Ferroviário de Maputo	(Mozambique)
C	16	Tamara Seda	29 – 18 June 1994	1.92 m (6 ft 4 in)	CB Jairis	(Spain)
PG	22	Ornélia Mutombene	32 – 24 October 1990	1.68 m (5 ft 6 in)	Ferroviário de Maputo	(Mozambique)
PF	23	Stefania Chiziane	26 – 26 December 1996	1.79 m (5 ft 10 in)	Ferroviário de Maputo	(Mozambique)

Head coach

- (Mozambique) Carlos Aik

Assistant coach(es)

- (Mozambique) Leonel Manhique
- (Mozambique) Ernesto Nhalungo

Legend

- Club – describes last
  club before the tournament
- Age – describes age
  on 28 July 2023

== Group C ==
=== Mali ===
Mali women's national basketball team roster
Players
Coaches

Pos.	No.	Name	Age – Date of birth	Height	Club	Ctr.
PF	00	Maimouna Haidara	19 – 2 June 2004	1.87 m (6 ft 2 in)	CB Adareva	(Spain)
F	1	Kankou Coulibaly	33 – 11 April 1990	1.87 m (6 ft 2 in)	Charnay Basket Bourgogne Sud	(France)
PG	4	Fatoumata Sanou	19 – 30 June 2004	1.55 m (5 ft 1 in)	Forces Armées	(Senegal)
G	9	Djeneba Sangaré	23 – 7 October 1999	1.78 m (5 ft 10 in)	Stade Malien	(France)
G	10	Alima Dembélé	23 – 20 January 2000	1.86 m (6 ft 1 in)	IDK Euskotren	(Spain)
PF	12	Adama Coulibaly	25 – 25 January 1998	1.85 m (6 ft 1 in)	Melilla	(Spain)
C	15	Mariam Coulibaly	25 – 7 October 1997	1.90 m (6 ft 3 in)	IDK Euskotren	(Spain)
PF	23	Sika Koné	21 – 13 July 2002	1.90 m (6 ft 3 in)	Spar Gran Canaria	(Spain)
F	24	Salimatou Kourouma	23 – 25 September 1999	1.79 m (5 ft 10 in)	KSC	(Mali)
	27	Assetou Traoré	28 – 27 February 1995
PG	50	Djeneba N'Diaye	26 – 8 July 1997	1.63 m (5 ft 4 in)	Club Polideportivo Bembibre	(Spain)
C	77	Diana Balayera	27 – 28 January 1996	1.91 m (6 ft 3 in)	Charnay Basket Bourgogne Sud	(France)

Head coach

- (Mali) Oumarou Sidiya

Assistant coach(es)

- (Mali) Hamchétou Maïga
- (Mali) Aminata Sininta

Legend

- Club – describes last
  club before the tournament
- Age – describes age
  on 28 July 2023

=== Senegal ===
A 19-player squad was announced on 7 June.

Senegal women's national basketball team roster
Players
Coaches

Pos.	No.	Name	Age – Date of birth	Height	Club	Ctr.
F	5	Aya Traoré	40 – 27 July 1983	1.8 m (5 ft 11 in)	Club Sant Josep Obrer	(Spain)
PF	6	Oumoul Sarr	39 – 25 January 1984	1.90 m (6 ft 3 in)	BC Castors Braine	(Belgium)
PG	7	Fatou Dieng	39 – 18 August 1983	1.68 m (5 ft 6 in)	Helsingborg BBK	(Sweden)
G	8	Cierra Dillard	27 – 6 May 1996	1.75 m (5 ft 9 in)	Alexandria	(Egypt)
SG	9	Couna Ndao	27 – 22 April 1996	1.76 m (5 ft 9 in)	ASC Ville de Dakar	(Senegal)
C	14	Arame Niang	26 – 14 February 1997	1.92 m (6 ft 4 in)	Montbrison Basket Féminin	(France)
C	21	Aicha Ndour	22 – 14 August 2000	1.98 m (6 ft 6 in)	Southern Illinois Salukis	(United States)
F	23	Mathilde Diop	26 – 15 June 1997	1.84 m (6 ft 0 in)	Jeanne d'Arc	(Senegal)
F	24	Yacine Diop	27 – 8 October 1995	1.78 m (5 ft 10 in)
F	32	Fatou Pouye	26 – 14 January 1997	1.84 m (6 ft 0 in)	Fundacion Ardoi	(Spain)
C	35	Madjiguene Sene	28 – 25 October 1994	1.97 m (6 ft 6 in)	BF Escaudain	(France)
C	45	Fatou Diagne	27 – 20 January 1996	1.95 m (6 ft 5 in)	CAB Estepona	(Spain)

Head coach

- (Senegal) Moustapha Gaye

Assistant coach(es)

- (Senegal) Ousmane Diallo
- (Senegal) Mboricka Fall

Legend

- Club – describes last
  club before the tournament
- Age – describes age
  on 28 July 2023

=== Uganda ===
A 19-player squad was announced on 22 June.

Uganda women's national basketball team roster
Players
Coaches

Pos.	No.	Name	Age – Date of birth	Height	Club	Ctr.
PG	1	Lydia Babirye	18 – 21 November 2004	1.75 m (5 ft 9 in)	Watoto Senior Secondary School	(Uganda)
PG	4	Flavia Oketcho	37 – 16 July 1986	1.70 m (5 ft 7 in)	KCCA Leopards	(Uganda)
	8	Ritah Imanishimwe	27 – 12 June 1996
	9	Evelyne Nakiyingi	25 – 11 February 1998
	10	Brenda Ekone	27 – 10 June 1996
	12	Hope Akello	24 – 29 September 1998
G	14	Jannon Jaye Otto	26 – 14 April 1997	1.83 m (6 ft 0 in)	Eastern Mavericks	(Australia)
	15	Priscilla Abey	23 – 22 December 1999
C	16	Maria Najjuma	19 – 25 December 2003	1.93 m (6 ft 4 in)	St Noa Girls Secondary School	(Uganda)
	18	Melissa Akullu	23 – 25 August 1999
C	22	Claire Lamunu	29 – 24 December 1993	1.85 m (6 ft 1 in)	Kenya Ports Authority	(Kenya)
	35	Jane Asinde	23 – 15 October 1999

Head coach

- (Spain) Alberto Antuña Leal

Assistant coach(es)

- (Uganda) Zumrati Mavita
- (Uganda) Nicholas Natuhereza

Legend

- Club – describes last
  club before the tournament
- Age – describes age
  on 28 July 2023

== Group D ==
=== DR Congo ===
DR Congo women's national basketball team roster
Players
Coaches

Pos.	No.	Name	Age – Date of birth	Height	Club	Ctr.
	4	Liliane Ikete	18 – 22 March 2005		BC Flamurtari Vlorë	(Albania)
	5	Gracia Nguz	31 – 29 June 1992		ASB Makomeno	(Democratic Republic of the Congo)
PG	6	Tania Kokolo	22 – 17 September 2000	1.67 m (5 ft 6 in)	C.N.S.S.	(Democratic Republic of the Congo)
PG	7	Ketia Mbelu	22 – 18 April 2001	1.64 m (5 ft 5 in)	C.N.S.S.	(Democratic Republic of the Congo)
	8	Feza Ebengo	23 – 16 November 1999		REG BBC	(Rwanda)
PF	9	Deorah Kaba	23 – 29 June 2000	1.84 m (6 ft 0 in)	C.N.S.S.	(Democratic Republic of the Congo)
	10	Debarah Washini	24 – 17 May 1999	1.89 m (6 ft 2 in)	C.N.S.S.	(Democratic Republic of the Congo)
G	11	Cecile Nyoka	36 – 18 September 1986	1.77 m (5 ft 10 in)	C.N.S.S.	(Democratic Republic of the Congo)
	12	Mariana Muadi	26 – 4 December 1996		Almería	(Spain)
	13	Malu Irebu	25 – 5 January 1998		C.N.S.S.	(Democratic Republic of the Congo)
	14	Mafuta Ngusu	34 – 23 February 1989		V-Club	(Morocco)
PF	15	Ginette Mfutila	35 – 20 April 1988	1.88 m (6 ft 2 in)	Reims Basket Féminin	(France)

Head coach

- (Democratic Republic of the Congo) Bellarmin Tshibangu

Assistant coach(es)

- (Democratic Republic of the Congo) Ravane Mwimba

Legend

- Club – describes last
  club before the tournament
- Age – describes age
  on 28 July 2023

=== Egypt ===
Egypt women's national basketball team roster
Players
Coaches

Pos.	No.	Name	Age – Date of birth	Height	Club	Ctr.
SF	0	Aya El-Fiky	20 – 29 March 2003	1.79 m (5 ft 10 in)	Gezira	(Egypt)
PG	1	Reem Moussa	29 – 23 January 1994	1.67 m (5 ft 6 in)	Alexandria	(Egypt)
SF	4	Meral Abdelgawad	24 – 13 November 1998	1.81 m (5 ft 11 in)	Al Ahly	(Egypt)
G	7	Nadine Mohamed	25 – 21 January 1998	1.80 m (5 ft 11 in)	Al Ahly	(Egypt)
PG	8	Soraya Degheidy	28 – 16 July 1995	1.72 m (5 ft 8 in)	Al Ahly	(Egypt)
G	9	Asrar Bakr	24 – 10 August 1998	1.80 m (5 ft 11 in)	Alexandria	(Egypt)
SF	10	Norhan Amed	27 – 21 July 1996	1.79 m (5 ft 10 in)	Alexandria	(Egypt)
PF	11	Radwa Sherif	25 – 1 February 1998	1.84 m (6 ft 0 in)	Gezira	(Egypt)
PF	13	Farida El-Sherif	24 – 7 October 1998	1.80 m (5 ft 11 in)	Heliopolis	(Egypt)
C	14	Jana Sallman	17 – 1 June 2006	1.89 m (6 ft 2 in)	BYU Cougars	(United States)
C	15	Raneem El-Gedawy	26 – 24 February 1997	1.86 m (6 ft 1 in)	Al Ahly	(Egypt)
C	97	Fatma Aly	26 – 3 February 1997	1.96 m (6 ft 5 in)	Al Ittihad	(Egypt)

Head coach

- (Egypt) Ehab El-Alfy

Assistant coach(es)

- (Egypt) Ismail Ahmed
- (Egypt) Ahmed El-Shakery

Legend

- Club – describes last
  club before the tournament
- Age – describes age
  on 28 July 2023

=== Nigeria ===
The roster was announced on 26 July.

Nigeria women's national basketball team roster
Players
Coaches

Pos.	No.	Name	Age – Date of birth	Height	Club	Ctr.
F	0	Amy Okonkwo	26 – 26 August 1996	1.88 m (6 ft 2 in)	Maccabi Haifa	(Israel)
	1	Alimat Abiola	24 – 26 November 1998
C	3	Pallas Kunaiyi-Akpannah	26 – 12 July 1997	1.88 m (6 ft 2 in)	Faenza Basket Project	(Italy)
G	5	Elizabeth Balogun	22 – 9 September 2000	1.85 m (6 ft 1 in)	Duke Blue Devils	(United States)
SG	7	Sarah Ogoke	33 – 25 June 1990	1.77 m (5 ft 10 in)	Ferroviário de Maputo	(Mozambique)
G	9	Ifunanya Okoro	24 – 6 July 1999	1.83 m (6 ft 0 in)	Tindastóll women's basketball	(Kenya)
F	11	Nicole Enabosi	26 – 26 March 1997	1.83 m (6 ft 0 in)	C' Chartres Basket Féminin	(France)
	14	Adenike Olawuyi	19 – 8 February 2004
F	20	Murjanatu Musa	23 – 5 May 2000	1.87 m (6 ft 2 in)	Celta de Vigo	(Spain)
	22	Blessing Ejiofor	24 – 2 September 1998		COB Calais	(France)
	23	Olaoluwatomi Taiwo	23 – 16 June 2000
	25	Adebola Adeyeye	23 – 11 October 1999

Head coach

- (Nigeria) Rena Wakama

Assistant coach(es)

- (Nigeria) Juliana Negedu
- (Nigeria) Samson Sotuminu

Legend

- Club – describes last
  club before the tournament
- Age – describes age
  on 28 July 2023
