= 2025 FIBA Women's AfroBasket squads =

This article displays the rosters for the teams competing at the 2025 Women's AfroBasket. Each team had to submit 12 players.

Age and club as of first day of the tournament, 26 July 2025.

== Group A ==
=== Angola ===
Angola women's national basketball team roster
Players
Coaches

Pos.	No.	Name	Age – Date of birth	Height	Club	Ctr.
SG	1	Italee Lucas	36 – 12 January 1989	1.72 m (5 ft 8 in)	APR WBBC	(Rwanda)
PF	5	Joana António	28 – 11 June 1997	1.90 m (6 ft 3 in)	MTÜ Tallinn	(Estonia)
G	6	Isabel Fernando	25 – 5 June 2000	1.68 m (5 ft 6 in)	Sporting Clube de Luanda	(Angola)
SF	8	Sara Caetano	21 – 9 September 2003	1.72 m (5 ft 8 in)	CRC Quinta dos Lombos	(Portugal)
PG	9	Denise Pascoal	25 – 8 September 1999	1.73 m (5 ft 8 in)	Primeiro de Agosto	(Angola)
G	12	Nelma Cunha	23 – 27 February 2002	1.78 m (5 ft 10 in)	Primeiro de Agosto	(Angola)
SF	13	Cristiana Correia	27 – 30 September 1997	1.85 m (6 ft 1 in)	Sporting Clube de Luanda	(Angola)
PF	14	Angelina Golome	37 – 23 March 1988	1.90 m (6 ft 3 in)	Formigas do Cazenga	(Angola)
G	16	Alexia Dizeko	24 – 12 March 2001	1.83 m (6 ft 0 in)
C	18	Avelina Peso	27 – 15 June 1998	1.87 m (6 ft 2 in)	Primeiro de Agosto	(Angola)
C	20	Cristina Matiquite	33 – 12 March 1992	1.91 m (6 ft 3 in)	Primeiro de Agosto	(Angola)
PG	24	Domilda Lussati	29 – 8 March 1996	1.65 m (5 ft 5 in)	Interclube	(Angola)

Head coach

- (Angola) Paulo Macedo

Assistant coach(es)

- (Angola) Fernando Figueiredo
- (Angola) Jaquelina Francisco

Legend

- Club – describes last
  club before the tournament
- Age – describes age
  on 26 July 2025

=== Egypt ===
Egypt women's national basketball team roster
Players
Coaches

Pos.	No.	Name	Age – Date of birth	Height	Club	Ctr.
SG	2	Laila Khalifa	21 – 12 July 2004	1.70 m (5 ft 7 in)	Al Zohour	(Egypt)
PG	3	Alia El-Shabrawy	23 – 1 October 2001	1.59 m (5 ft 3 in)	Heliopolis	(Egypt)
SF	4	Meral Abdelgawad	26 – 13 November 1998	1.81 m (5 ft 11 in)	Al Ahly	(Egypt)
PG	5	Radwa Oweis	25 – 14 November 1999	1.65 m (5 ft 5 in)	Al Ahly	(Egypt)
PG	6	Ingy Badawy	24 – 8 July 2001	1.73 m (5 ft 8 in)	Smouha SC	(Egypt)
C	7	Khadiga Abouelghait	18 – 1 March 2007	1.90 m (6 ft 3 in)	Gezira	(Egypt)
G	9	Asrar Bakr	26 – 10 August 1998	1.80 m (5 ft 11 in)	Alexandria	(Egypt)
SF	10	Norhan Amed	29 – 21 July 1996	1.79 m (5 ft 10 in)	Alexandria	(Egypt)
F	12	Farida Abdelnabi	29 – 23 July 1996	1.79 m (5 ft 10 in)	Al Ahly	(Egypt)
C	15	Raneem El-Gedawy	28 – 24 February 1997	1.86 m (6 ft 1 in)	Al Ahly	(Egypt)
F	23	Hala El-Shaarawy	32 – 18 January 1993	1.84 m (6 ft 0 in)	Alexandria	(Egypt)
F	33	Tamara Ibrahim	20 – 26 September 2004	1.84 m (6 ft 0 in)	Al Ahly	(Egypt)

Head coach

- (Spain) Julián Martínez

Assistant coach(es)

- (Egypt) Aliaa Gamal
- (Egypt) Ahmed Gomaa

Legend

- Club – describes last
  club before the tournament
- Age – describes age
  on 26 July 2025

=== Ivory Coast ===
Ivory Coast women's national basketball team roster
Players
Coaches
1 z

Pos.	No.	Name	Age – Date of birth	Height	Club	Ctr.
PG	0	Molly Kaiser	23 – 23 July 2002	1.72 m (5 ft 8 in)	New Mexico State Aggies	(United States)
PG	5	Hanna Amani	29 – 11 April 1996	1.66 m (5 ft 5 in)	C.N.S.S.	(Democratic Republic of the Congo)
PF	6	Amma Ouraga	25 – 6 December 1999	1.89 m (6 ft 2 in)	Friend's Basketball Association	(Ivory Coast)
F	7	Djefarina Diawara	30 – 13 September 1994	1.80 m (5 ft 11 in)	Porte du Hainaut	(France)
C	8	Aminata Savadogo	26 – 22 September 1998	1.80 m (5 ft 11 in)	Friend's Basketball Association	(Ivory Coast)
SG	10	Aminata Dosso	26 – 16 January 1999	1.75 m (5 ft 9 in)	COB Calais	(France)
SF	11	Laëtitia Sahie	25 – 26 June 2000	1.89 m (6 ft 2 in)	Le Havre	(France)
PF	13	Fatou Diakite	21 – 13 January 2004	1.90 m (6 ft 3 in)	South Florida Bulls	(United States)
PG	14	Ameryst Alston	31 – 20 January 1994	1.75 m (5 ft 9 in)	Angers Basket	(France)
PF	15	Grace Tolo	24 – 3 January 2001	1.91 m (6 ft 3 in)	Friend's Basketball Association	(Ivory Coast)
F	17	Bougouha Ble	20 – 26 September 2004	1.96 m (6 ft 5 in)	ESB Villeneuve-d'Ascq	(France)
C	22	Kariata Diaby	30 – 29 June 1995	1.93 m (6 ft 4 in)	Tango Bourges Basket	(France)

Head coach

- (France) Stéphane Leite

Assistant coach(es)

- (Ivory Coast) Dénaïmou N'Garsanet
- (Ivory Coast) Sidibé Ousmane

Legend

- Club – describes last
  club before the tournament
- Age – describes age
  on 26 July 2025

== Group B ==
=== Cameroon ===
Cameroon women's national basketball team roster
Players
Coaches

Pos.	No.	Name	Age – Date of birth	Height	Club	Ctr.
G	0	Joëlly Belleka	29 – 27 August 1995	1.71 m (5 ft 7 in)	USO Mondeville	(France)
G	3	Jessica Thomas	30 – 27 October 1994	1.68 m (5 ft 6 in)	Emlak Konut SK	(Turkey)
SG	6	Kelya Kipo	19 – 16 May 2006	1.83 m (6 ft 0 in)	FAP Basketball	(Cameroon)
G	10	Sema Ekah	22 – 18 June 2003	1.76 m (5 ft 9 in)	Overdose Up Station	(Cameroon)
PF	12	Dulcy Fankam Mendjiadeu	26 – 26 July 1999	1.94 m (6 ft 4 in)	ŽKK Crvena zvezda	(Serbia)
F	13	Marguerite Effa	28 – 18 January 1997	1.91 m (6 ft 3 in)	USLG Cherbourg	(France)
F	14	Marina Ewodo	27 – 24 June 1998	1.85 m (6 ft 1 in)	Tarbes Gespe Bigorre	(France)
F	22	Maëva Mfonow	20 – 22 April 2005	1.85 m (6 ft 1 in)	Toulouse Métropole Basket	(France)
F	23	Carina Silatsa	27 – 28 April 1998	1.86 m (6 ft 1 in)	Roche Vendée	(France)
C	24	Damaris Emédié	18 – 19 January 2007	1.92 m (6 ft 4 in)	University of Douala	(Cameroon)
SG	34	Cynthia Williams	22 – 13 April 2003	1.72 m (5 ft 8 in)	University of Douala	(Cameroon)
PG	66	Josiane Tientcheu	27 – 6 June 1998	1.67 m (5 ft 6 in)	Kepler BBC	(Rwanda)

Head coach

- (Cameroon) Ahmed Mbombo

Assistant coach(es)

- (Italy) Stefano Bizzozi
- (Cameroon) Alfred Njie Akum

Legend

- Club – describes last
  club before the tournament
- Age – describes age
  on 26 July 2025

=== Mali ===
Mali women's national basketball team roster
Players
Coaches

Pos.	No.	Name	Age – Date of birth	Height	Club	Ctr.
F	0	Sira Thienou	21 – 9 January 2004	1.78 m (5 ft 10 in)	Free agent
F	1	Fourne Sissoko	26 – 11 January 1999	1.68 m (5 ft 6 in)	ASC Ville de Dakar	(Senegal)
PF	2	Aminata Sangaré	23 – 10 February 2002	1.85 m (6 ft 1 in)
C	6	Roukia Doumbia	26 – 5 May 1999	1.75 m (5 ft 9 in)	Arkansas Razorbacks	(United States)
PF	10	Maimouna Haidara	21 – 2 June 2004	1.87 m (6 ft 2 in)	Club Deportivo Bosco	(Spain)
F	11	Kadidia Maiga	28 – 6 April 1997	1.75 m (5 ft 9 in)	ASC Ville de Dakar	(Senegal)
G	12	Alima Dembélé	25 – 20 January 2000	1.86 m (6 ft 1 in)	Joventut Badalona	(Spain)
C	13	Mama Cissé	20 – 3 September 2004	1.83 m (6 ft 0 in)	Free agent
F	22	Kamita Dabou	20 – 9 November 2004	1.79 m (5 ft 10 in)	ASC Ville de Dakar	(Senegal)
PF	23	Sika Koné	23 – 13 July 2002	1.90 m (6 ft 3 in)	CB Avenida	(Spain)
G	50	Djeneba N'Diaye	28 – 8 July 1997	1.65 m (5 ft 5 in)	Caledonia Gladiators	(United Kingdom)
C	77	Diana Balayera	29 – 28 January 1996	1.91 m (6 ft 3 in)	Charnay Basket Bourgogne Sud	(France)

Head coach

- (Mali) Oumarou Sidiya

Assistant coach(es)

- (Mali) Hamchétou Maïga
- (Mali) Kaba Kanté

Legend

- Club – describes last
  club before the tournament
- Age – describes age
  on 26 July 2025

=== South Sudan ===
South Sudan women's national basketball team roster
Players
Coaches

Pos.	No.	Name	Age – Date of birth	Height	Club	Ctr.
PG	00	Delicia Washington	28 – 11 May 1997	1.67 m (5 ft 6 in)	Fuerza Regia Femenil	(Mexico)
SG	0	Sarah Deng	20 – 14 September 2004	1.75 m (5 ft 9 in)	Florida Gators	(United States)
C	2	Adut Bulgak	32 – 20 December 1992	1.93 m (6 ft 4 in)	Fundación Asnimo	(Spain)
PG	3	Shanyce Makuei	25 – 6 January 2000	1.66 m (5 ft 5 in)	Sporting Clube Coimbrões	(Portugal)
G	4	Nyamuoch Teny	27 – 1 January 1998	1.67 m (5 ft 6 in)	COD Meknès	(Morocco)
C	5	Maria Gakdeng	22 – 9 June 2003	1.89 m (6 ft 2 in)	KSC Szekszárd	(Hungary)
SG	6	Anegor Wol	27 – 25 June 1998	1.69 m (5 ft 7 in)	Alberta Golden Bears and Pandas	(Canada)
F	7	Nyamer Diew	23 – 10 December 2001	1.72 m (5 ft 8 in)	Colorado Buffaloes	(United States)
F	8	Rose Macuei	25 – 24 April 2000	1.87 m (6 ft 2 in)	REG Women BBC	(Rwanda)
SG	11	Yar Mayen	26 – 25 September 1998	1.65 m (5 ft 5 in)	Lakeside Lightning	(Australia)
PG	21	Perina Leime	23 – 20 February 2002	1.65 m (5 ft 5 in)	Little Rock Trojans	(United States)
C	32	Piath Gabriel	33 – 2 August 1991	1.91 m (6 ft 3 in)	Valencia Basket Club SAD	(Spain)

Head coach

- (Spain) Alberto Antuña

Assistant coach(es)

- (Spain) Alberto Carrillo
- (South Sudan) Marcus Wong

Legend

- Club – describes last
  club before the tournament
- Age – describes age
  on 26 July 2025

== Group C ==
=== Guinea ===
Guinea men's national basketball team roster
Players
Coaches

Pos.	No.	Name	Age – Date of birth	Height	Club	Ctr.
SG	1	Fatoumata Jallow	28 – 16 April 1997	1.70 m (5 ft 7 in)	Alviks BK	(Sweden)
SG	2	Nana Souman	19 – 11 September 2005	1.75 m (5 ft 9 in)	Centre Fédéral	(Guinea)
G	4	Catherine Keita	22 – 13 June 2003	1.74 m (5 ft 9 in)	Free agent
PF	5	Masseny Kaba	26 – 15 December 1998	1.91 m (6 ft 3 in)	UF Angers	(France)
SG	7	Aicha Mara	29 – 24 January 1996	1.80 m (5 ft 11 in)	AS Monaco	(France)
F	8	Fatima Sacko	27 – 19 April 1998	1.75 m (5 ft 9 in)
F	10	Salematou Sylla	22 – 16 February 2003	1.80 m (5 ft 11 in)
PF	11	Batouly Camara	28 – 2 November 1996	1.88 m (6 ft 2 in)	CP Bembibre	(Spain)
C	14	Nafisatou Diack	20 – 11 November 2004	1.80 m (5 ft 11 in)	Centre Fédéral	(Guinea)
C	22	Fanta Sidibe	19 – 2 April 2006	1.75 m (5 ft 9 in)	Panthers BC	(Guinea)
C	23	Saran Tohonamou	18 – 2 January 2007	1.90 m (6 ft 3 in)	Seed Academy	(Senegal)

Head coach

- (Guinea) Malick Kone

Assistant coach(es)

- (Guinea) Ibrahima Touré
- (France) Rany Rubio

Legend

- Club – describes last
  club before the tournament
- Age – describes age
  on 26 July 2025

=== Senegal ===
Senegal women's national basketball team roster
Players
Coaches

Pos.	No.	Name	Age – Date of birth	Height	Club	Ctr.
PF	00	Nene Ndiaye	21 – 6 January 2004	1.84 m (6 ft 0 in)	Boston College Eagles	(United States)
PG	3	Victorine Thiaw	22 – 3 July 2003	1.67 m (5 ft 6 in)	BC Franconville	(France)
G	8	Cierra Dillard	29 – 8 May 1996	1.75 m (5 ft 9 in)	Hapoel Kfar Saba	(Israel)
C	20	Khadija Faye	22 – 5 November 2002	1.92 m (6 ft 4 in)	Pittsburgh Panthers	(United States)
F	22	Ndioma Kané	25 – 20 December 1999	1.90 m (6 ft 3 in)	Al Ahly	(Egypt)
F	23	Mathilde Diop	28 – 15 June 1997	1.84 m (6 ft 0 in)	St. Pauls BC	(Republic of Ireland)
F	24	Yacine Diop	29 – 8 October 1995	1.78 m (5 ft 10 in)	Yalova VIP	(Turkey)
F	32	Fatou Pouye	28 – 14 January 1997	1.84 m (6 ft 0 in)	ASC Ville de Dakar	(Senegal)
C	34	Khadidiatou Sarr	26 – 22 March 1999	1.90 m (6 ft 3 in)	Saint-Amand Hainaut	(France)
C	35	Madjiguene Sene	30 – 25 October 1994	1.97 m (6 ft 6 in)	Sporting Bkennaya	(Lebanon)
C	41	Sokhna Ndiaye	30 – 15 July 1995	1.90 m (6 ft 3 in)	AS Montferrandaise	(France)
SG	77	Lena Timera	30 – 28 August 1994	1.86 m (6 ft 1 in)	Cavigal Nice Basket	(France)

Head coach

- (United States) Otis Hughley Jr.

Assistant coach(es)

- (Senegal) Khardiata Diop
- (Senegal) Sidy Sali

Legend

- Club – describes last
  club before the tournament
- Age – describes age
  on 26 July 2025

=== Uganda ===
Uganda women's national basketball team roster
Players
Coaches

Pos.	No.	Name	Age – Date of birth	Height	Club	Ctr.
SG	1	Perus Nyamwenge	25 – 5 February 2000	1.70 m (5 ft 7 in)	KCCA Leopards	(Uganda)
SG	4	Tracy Namugosa	25 – 31 March 2000	1.70 m (5 ft 7 in)	KCCA Leopards	(Uganda)
SF	5	Agatha Kamwada	24 – 24 November 2000	1.70 m (5 ft 7 in)	JKL Dolphins	(Uganda)
PG	7	Shakirah Nanvubya	24 – 13 November 2000	1.72 m (5 ft 8 in)	JKL Dolphins	(Uganda)
SG	9	Jamila Nansikombi	28 – 22 February 1997	1.84 m (6 ft 0 in)	JKL Dolphins	(Uganda)
PG	11	Evelyne Nakiyingi	26 – 2 November 1998	1.68 m (5 ft 6 in)	JKL Dolphins	(Uganda)
C	12	Hope Akello	26 – 29 September 1998	1.83 m (6 ft 0 in)	JKL Dolphins	(Uganda)
PF	16	Sharon Nangobi	29 – 3 April 1996	1.88 m (6 ft 2 in)	KIU Rangers	(Uganda)
C	18	Melissa Akullu	25 – 25 August 1999	1.85 m (6 ft 1 in)	Imortal D.C.	(Portugal)
C	22	Claire Lamunu	31 – 24 December 1993	1.85 m (6 ft 1 in)	Kenya Ports Authority	(Kenya)
SF	24	Paige Robinson	25 – 24 July 2000	1.88 m (6 ft 2 in)	Herner TC	(Germany)
SF	35	Jane Asinde	25 – 15 October 1999	1.88 m (6 ft 2 in)	Porta XI Ensino	(Spain)

Head coach

- (Uganda) Nicholas Natuhereza

Assistant coach(es)

- (Uganda) Julius Lutwana

Legend

- Club – describes last
  club before the tournament
- Age – describes age
  on 26 July 2025

== Group D ==
=== Mozambique ===
Mozambique women's national basketball team roster
Players
Coaches
1 1

Pos.	No.	Name	Age – Date of birth	Height	Club	Ctr.
PG	0	Bruna Argelio	25 – 24 December 1999	1.64 m (5 ft 5 in)	Ferroviário de Maputo	(Mozambique)
SG	1	Silvia Veloso	26 – 18 October 1998	1.72 m (5 ft 8 in)	Ferroviário de Maputo	(Mozambique)
PG	4	Delma Zita	27 – 27 March 1998	1.72 m (5 ft 8 in)	Ferroviário de Maputo	(Mozambique)
C	5	Nilza Chiziane	33 – 27 February 1992	1.88 m (6 ft 2 in)	Costa do Sol	(Mozambique)
F	6	Ingvild Mucauro	32 – 12 September 1992	1.78 m (5 ft 10 in)	Ferroviário de Maputo	(Mozambique)
F	10	Chanaya Pinto	25 – 26 June 2000	1.85 m (6 ft 1 in)
PF	11	Leia Dongue	34 – 24 May 1991	1.85 m (6 ft 1 in)	OBG Roma	(Italy)
C	15	Vilma Covane	28 – 10 October 1996	1.80 m (5 ft 11 in)	Costa do Sol	(Mozambique)
C	18	Carla Covane	26 – 23 June 1999	1.89 m (6 ft 2 in)	Ferroviário de Maputo	(Mozambique)
PF	23	Stefania Chiziane	28 – 26 December 1996	1.79 m (5 ft 10 in)	Ferroviário de Maputo	(Mozambique)
C	24	Hulda Joaquim	25 – 4 May 2000	1.83 m (6 ft 0 in)	Ferroviário de Maputo	(Mozambique)
PF	26	Iolanda Francisco	26 – 20 August 1998	1.83 m (6 ft 0 in)	Ferroviário da Beira	(Mozambique)

Head coach

- (Mozambique) Nasir Salé

Assistant coach(es)

- (Mozambique) Carlos Dezanove

Legend

- Club – describes last
  club before the tournament
- Age – describes age
  on 26 July 2025

=== Nigeria ===
Nigeria women's national basketball team – 2024 Summer Olympics roster
Players
Coaches

Pos.	No.	Name	Age – Date of birth	Height	Club	Ctr.
F	0	Amy Okonkwo (C)	28 – 26 August 1996	1.88 m (6 ft 2 in)	Tango Bourges Basket	(France)
C	3	Pallas Kunaiyi-Akpannah	28 – 12 July 1997	1.88 m (6 ft 2 in)	Magnolia Basket Campobasso	(Italy)
G	4	Elizabeth Balogun	24 – 9 September 2000	1.85 m (6 ft 1 in)	Charnay Bourgogne Sud	(France)
SG	7	Sarah Ogoke	35 – 25 June 1990	1.77 m (5 ft 10 in)	Ferroviário de Maputo	(Mozambique)
G	9	Ifunanya Okoro	26 – 6 July 1999	1.83 m (6 ft 0 in)	Sporting	(Egypt)
PG	10	Promise Amukamara	32 – 22 June 1993	1.75 m (5 ft 9 in)	Maccabi Rishon LeZion	(Israel)
C	13	Vera Ojenuwa	20 – 2 February 2005	1.94 m (6 ft 4 in)	Georgia Lady Bulldogs	(Spain)
F	20	Murjanatu Musa	25 – 5 May 2000	1.87 m (6 ft 2 in)	Tarbes Gespe Bigorre	(France)
C	22	Blessing Ejiofor	26 – 2 September 1998	1.95 m (6 ft 5 in)	Alpo Basket	(Italy)
PG	23	Ezinne Kalu	33 – 26 June 1992	1.73 m (5 ft 8 in)	OBG Roma	(Italy)
C	25	Victoria Macaulay	34 – 7 August 1990	1.93 m (6 ft 4 in)	Emlak Konut SK	(Turkey)
F	33	Nicole Enabosi	28 – 26 March 1997	1.83 m (6 ft 0 in)	Chartres Basket Feminin	(France)

Head coach

- (Nigeria) Rena Wakama

Assistant coach(es)

- (France) Wani Muganguzi
- (Nigeria) Prince Ezeala

Legend

- (C) Team captain
- Club – describes last
  club before the tournament
- Age – describes age
  on 26 July 2025

=== Rwanda ===
Rwanda men's national basketball team roster
Players
Coaches

Pos.	No.	Name	Age – Date of birth	Height	Club	Ctr.
SG	2	Rosine Micomyiza	30 – 9 May 1995	1.62 m (5 ft 4 in)	REG BBC	(Rwanda)
PG	3	Destiney Philoxy	22 – 25 October 2000	1.72 m (5 ft 8 in)	REG BBC	(Rwanda)
C	5	Bella Murekatete	25 – 4 July 2000	1.92 m (6 ft 4 in)	AE Sedis Bàsquet	(Spain)
C	10	Hope Butera	22 – 10 February 2001	1.97 m (6 ft 6 in)	CAB Estepona	(Spain)
PG	12	Odile Tetero	27 – 24 February 1998	1.59 m (5 ft 3 in)	REG BBC	(Rwanda)
PF	14	Ange Irakoze	21 – 24 December 2003	1.81 m (5 ft 11 in)	REG BBC	(Rwanda)
PG	20	Faustine Mwizerwa	24 – 26 April 2001	1.65 m (5 ft 5 in)	Free agent
PF	22	Assouma Uwizeye	29 – 6 April 1996	1.82 m (6 ft 0 in)	APR BBC	(Rwanda)
PG	23	Irakoze Stephanie	21 – 19 June 2004	1.66 m (5 ft 5 in)	APR BBC	(Rwanda)
F	24	Keisha Hampton	35 – 22 February 1990	1.87 m (6 ft 2 in)	Virtus Eirene Ragusa	(Italy)
C	26	Rebecca Cyuzuzo	17 – 29 September 2007	1.92 m (6 ft 4 in)	The Hoops Rwanda	(Rwanda)
SG	77	Gloriose Byukusenge	24 – 12 April 2001	1.68 m (5 ft 6 in)	REG BBC	(Rwanda)

Head coach

- (Senegal) Cheikh Sarr

Assistant coach(es)

- (Rwanda) Patrick Habiyambere
- (Rwanda) Esperance Mukaneza

Legend

- Club – describes last
  club before the competition
- Age – describes age
  on 26 July 2025
