= Marie Imanizabayo =

Rwandan basketball player (born 1996)

APR
- Position: Point Guard
- League: 2023 FIBA Women's AfroBasket; 2019 FIBA Africa Champions Cup Women - Qualifiers

Personal information
- Born: 12 December 1996 (age 29)
- Listed height: 5 ft 7 in (1.70 m)

Marie Laurence Imanizabayo (born 12 December 1996) is a Rwandan basketball player who plays for Rwanda National Team.

== National team Career ==
She played for Rwanda at the 2023 FIBA Women's Afro-basket alongside Destiney Philoxy, Ineza Sifa, Janai Crooms, and Hope Butera where they were chosen to take the court first.

She also contributed to her country win 64—35 against the Ivorians at the 2023 FIBA Women's Afro-basket with 4 points and 2 rebounds before suffered ankle injury 51 seconds to the end of the game.
