= 2023 FIBA Women's AfroBasket =

Women's basketball tournament in Rwanda

26th FIBA Women's African Basketball Championship

Tournament details
- Host country: Rwanda
- City: Kigali
- Dates: 28 July – 5 August
- Teams: 12 (from 1 confederation)
- Venue: 1 (in 1 host city)

Final positions
- Champions: Nigeria (6th title)
- Runners-up: Senegal
- Third place: Mali
- Fourth place: Rwanda

Tournament statistics
- Games played: 28
- MVP: (Nigeria) Amy Okonkwo
- Top scorer: (Uganda) Jannon Jaye Otto (21.3 points per game)

Official website
- www.fiba.basketball/history

The 2023 FIBA Women's AfroBasket was the 26th edition of the tournament and held from 28 July to 5 August 2023 in Kigali, Rwanda.

Nigeria won their fourth consecutive and sixth overall title after defeating Senegal in the final, 84–74.

== Host selection ==
Rwanda was awarded the hosting rights on 25 May 2023. This was the first time Rwanda hosted the event and the second time overall in any senior level, having hosted the men's tournament in 2021.

== Format ==
The 12 teams were split into four groups of three teams each. The first-placed team qualified to the quarterfinals while the other two teams played in a playoff round. A second-placed team faced off against a third-placed team and vice versa. A knockout-system was used after the preliminary round and the losing teams of the quarterfinals played classification games while the winners played out the champion.

== Qualification ==
Country	Qualified as	Date of qualification	Last appearance	Best placement in tournament	WR
Rwanda	Host nation	25 May 2023	2011	Ninth place (2009, 2011)	88
Nigeria	2021 Women's AfroBasket semi-finalists	23 September 2021	2021	Champions (2003, 2005, 2017, 2019, 2021)	15
Senegal	2021 Women's AfroBasket semi-finalists	23 September 2021	2021	Champions (1974, 1977, 1979, 1981, 1984, 1990, 1993, 1997, 2000, 2009, 2015)	31
Cameroon	2021 Women's AfroBasket semi-finalists	23 September 2021	2021	Runners-up (2015)	50
Mali	2021 Women's AfroBasket semi-finalists	23 September 2021	2021	Champions (2007)	26
Egypt	Zone 5 winner	19 February 2023	2021	Champions (1966, 1968)	42
Mozambique	Zone 6 winner	28 February 2023	2021	Runners-up (1986, 2003, 2013)	47
DR Congo	Zone 4 winner	25 March 2023	2019	Champions (1983, 1986, 1994)	74
Angola	Wildcard	9 June 2023	2021	Champions (2011, 2013)	48
Uganda	Wildcard	9 June 2023	2015	Ninth place (1997)	80
Ivory Coast	Zone 2 / Zone 3 winner	2 July 2023	2021	Fourth place (1977, 2009)	54
Guinea	Wildcard	3 July 2023	2021	Runners-up (1966)	99

== Venue ==
Similar to the 2021 AfroBasket on the men's side, the now-named BK Arena (formerly the Kigali Arena) host the whole tournament.

2023 FIBA Women's AfroBasket is located in Rwanda	Kigali
2023 FIBA Women's AfroBasket is located in Rwanda	BK Arena
2023 FIBA Women's AfroBasket is located in Rwanda	Capacity: 10,000

== Squads ==
Each team had to commit a roster of 12 players.

== Draw ==
The draw took place on 9 June 2023 in Maputo, Mozambique.

== Preliminary round ==
All times are local (UTC+2).

=== Group A ===
Pos	Team	Pld	W	L	PF	PA	PD	Pts	Qualification
1	Rwanda (H)	2	1	1	132	109	+23	3	Quarterfinals
2	Angola	2	1	1	143	140	+3	3	Qualification to quarterfinals
3	Ivory Coast	2	1	1	107	133	−26	3	Qualification to quarterfinals

Source: FIBA
Rules for classification: 1) Points; 2) Head-to-head results; 3) Points difference; 4) Points scored.
(H) Hosts

28 July 2023
18:00

Boxscore

Rwanda	64–35	Ivory Coast
Scoring by quarter: 14–7, 14–14, 24–8, 12–6
Pts: Philoxy 18; Rebs: Butera 8 Asts: Philoxy 7		Pts: Amani 6 Rebs: Sieza 9 Asts: five players 1

BK Arena, Kigali
Referees: Johnny Batista (PUR), Sara El-Sharnouby (EGY), Fanta Touré (MLI)

29 July 2023
21:00

Boxscore

Ivory Coast	72–69	Angola
Scoring by quarter: 21–13, 21–24, 19–13, 11–19
Pts: Diawara 21; Rebs: three players 5 Asts: Amani 7		Pts: Caetano 18; Rebs: Manuel 11; Asts: Manuel 4

BK Arena, Kigali
Referees: Julio Anaya (PAN), Monicca Nassuuna (UGA), Erick Otieno (KEN)

30 July 2023
18:00

Boxscore

Angola	74–68 (OT)	Rwanda
Scoring by quarter: 8–16, 14–22, 22–4, 20–22, Overtime: 10–4
Pts: Manuel 21; Rebs: Matiquite 19; Asts: Antonio 7		Pts: Crooms 19; Rebs: Butera 6 Asts: three players 3

BK Arena, Kigali

=== Group B ===
Pos	Team	Pld	W	L	PF	PA	PD	Pts	Qualification
1	Cameroon	2	2	0	125	103	+22	4	Quarterfinals
2	Mozambique	2	1	1	152	95	+57	3	Qualification to quarterfinals
3	Guinea	2	0	2	90	169	−79	2	Qualification to quarterfinals

Source: FIBA
Rules for classification: 1) Points; 2) Head-to-head results; 3) Points difference; 4) Points scored.

28 July 2023
21:00

Boxscore

Cameroon	55–53	Mozambique
Scoring by quarter: 16–12, 16–14, 11–14, 12–13
Pts: Silatsa 13; Rebs: Silatsa 10; Asts: Thomas 3		Pts: Mafanela 18; Rebs: Seda 16; Asts: Chiziane 6

BK Arena, Kigali
Referees: Julio Anaya (PAN), Monicca Nassuuna (UGA), Aya Ahmed (EGY)

29 July 2023
15:00

Boxscore

Mozambique	99–40	Guinea
Scoring by quarter: 25–7, 22–5, 35–15, 17–13
Pts: Dongue 25; Rebs: Seda 12; Asts: Mafanela		Pts: Jallow 18; Rebs: Diack, Kaba 5 Asts: Jallow 3

BK Arena, Kigali
Referees: Sara El-Sharnouby (EGY), Arbia Belghith (TUN), Christelle Madjio (CMR)

30 July 2023
12:00

Boxscore

Guinea	50–70	Cameroon
Scoring by quarter: 15–21, 21–17, 4–18, 10–14
Pts: Jallow 17; Rebs: Kaba 13; Asts: Mara 5		Pts: Akoa 19; Rebs: Effa 9 Asts: Akoa, Mukoko 5

BK Arena, Kigali

=== Group C ===
Pos	Team	Pld	W	L	PF	PA	PD	Pts	Qualification
1	Mali	2	2	0	152	115	+37	4	Quarterfinals
2	Uganda	2	1	1	151	163	−12	3	Qualification to quarterfinals
3	Senegal	2	0	2	132	157	−25	2	Qualification to quarterfinals

Source: FIBA
Rules for classification: 1) Points; 2) Head-to-head results; 3) Points difference; 4) Points scored.

28 July 2023
14:30

Boxscore

Mali	80–66	Uganda
Scoring by quarter: 16–19, 21–14, 21–16, 22–17
Pts: N'Diaye 25; Rebs: Dembélé 10; Asts: N'Diaye 5		Pts: Otto 19; Rebs: Akullu 10; Asts: Akello 4

BK Arena, Kigali
Referees: Arbia Belghith (TUN), Didier Gaga (RWA), Benedicte Kologo (CIV)

29 July 2023
18:00

Boxscore

Uganda	85–83	Senegal
Scoring by quarter: 17–21, 18–17, 22–18, 28–27
Pts: Otto 21; Rebs: Akullu, Lamunu 10; Asts: Otto 5		Pts: Traoré 29; Rebs: Diagne 9 Asts: Dieng 7

BK Arena, Kigali

30 July 2023
21:00

Boxscore

Senegal	49–72	Mali
Scoring by quarter: 16–11, 12–15, 8–26, 13–20
Pts: Dillard 20; Rebs: Coulibaly, Ndour 6 Asts: Dillard 4		Pts: Koné 18; Rebs: M. Coulibaly 12; Asts: N'Diaye 5

BK Arena, Kigali
Referees: Joyce Muchenu (ZIM), Natascha Onono (RSA), Nadjet Zenagui (ALG)

=== Group D ===
Pos	Team	Pld	W	L	PF	PA	PD	Pts	Qualification
1	Nigeria	2	2	0	152	100	+52	4	Quarterfinals
2	Egypt	2	1	1	154	161	−7	3	Qualification to quarterfinals
3	DR Congo	2	0	2	113	158	−45	2	Qualification to quarterfinals

Source: FIBA
Rules for classification: 1) Points; 2) Head-to-head results; 3) Points difference; 4) Points scored.

28 July 2023
11:30

Boxscore

Nigeria	69–35	DR Congo
Scoring by quarter: 16–8, 13–10, 17–14, 23–3
Pts: Balogun, Okoro 11; Rebs: Kunaiyi-Akpannah 10; Asts: five players 2		Pts: Nguz 12; Rebs: Mfutila 11; Asts: Kokolo 4

BK Arena, Kigali
Referees: Erick Otieno (KEN), Nadege Zouzou (CIV), Claudio Eiuba (ANG)

29 July 2023
12:00

Boxscore

DR Congo	78–89	Egypt
Scoring by quarter: 12–23, 20–15, 29–23, 17–28
Pts: Muadi 21; Rebs: Muadi 10; Asts: Mbelu 6		Pts: Mohamed 34; Rebs: El-Gedawy 14; Asts: Abdelgawad 7

BK Arena, Kigali
Referees: Fanta Touré (MLI), Harouna Maïga (BFA), Benedicte Kologo (CIV)

30 July 2023
15:00

Boxscore

Egypt	65–83	Nigeria
Scoring by quarter: 10–18, 13–24, 19–14, 23–27
Pts: Abdelgawad 19; Rebs: El-Gedawy 10; Asts: Moussa 5		Pts: Okonkwo 29; Rebs: Okonkwo 13; Asts: Okoro 6

BK Arena, Kigali

== Knockout stage ==
=== Bracket ===
Qualification to QF
1 August
Uganda	78
DR Congo	62
1 August
Mozambique	70
Ivory Coast	48
1 August
Egypt	60
Senegal	71
1 August
Angola	69
Guinea	71

Quarterfinals
2 August
Rwanda	66
Uganda	61
2 August
Nigeria	59
Mozambique	52
2 August
Cameroon	77
Senegal	80
2 August
Mali	96
Guinea	40

Semifinals
3 August
Rwanda	48
Nigeria	79
3 August
Senegal	75
Mali	65

Final
5 August
Nigeria	84
Senegal	74
Third place game
5 August
Rwanda	51
Mali	89

5th place bracket

5th–8th place semifinals
3 August
Uganda	62
Mozambique	88
3 August
Cameroon	73
Guinea	37

Fifth place game
4 August
Mozambique	74
Cameroon	65
Seventh place game
4 August
Uganda	85
Guinea	44

=== Qualification to quarterfinals ===
1 August 2023
12:00

Boxscore

Angola	69–71	Guinea
Scoring by quarter: 15–17, 15–16, 23–12, 16–26
Pts: Matiquite 21; Rebs: Matiquite 11; Asts: Fernando 3		Pts: Kaba 26; Rebs: Kaba 14; Asts: Mara 5

BK Arena, Kigali
Referees: Nadjet Zenagui (ALG), Natascha Onono (RSA), Christelle Madjio (CMR)

1 August 2023
15:00

Boxscore

Egypt	60–71	Senegal
Scoring by quarter: 24–18, 11–20, 17–13, 8–20
Pts: El-Gedawy 17; Rebs: El-Gedawy 7 Asts: Moussa 4		Pts: Diagne 17; Rebs: Diagne 10; Asts: Dieng 7

BK Arena, Kigali
Referees: Johnny Batista (PUR), Claudio Eiuba (ANG), Benedicte Kologo (CIV)

1 August 2023
18:00

Boxscore

Mozambique	70–48	Ivory Coast
Scoring by quarter: 21–7, 16–19, 13–10, 20–12
Pts: Dongue 18; Rebs: Dongue 13; Asts: four players 3		Pts: Djedjemel 10; Rebs: Sieza 12; Asts: Diawara 4

BK Arena, Kigali
Referees: Aya Ahmed (EGY), Didier Gaga (RWA), Haytham Ihaqaf (LBA)

1 August 2023
21:00

Boxscore

Uganda	78–62	DR Congo
Scoring by quarter: 12–15, 18–15, 23–15, 25–17
Pts: Asinde, Otto 18; Rebs: Lamunu 14; Asts: Babirye 11		Pts: Nguz 15; Rebs: Kaba 11; Asts: Mbelu 7

BK Arena, Kigali
Referees: Nadege Zouzou (CIV), Joyce Muchenu (ZIM), Fanta Touré (MLI)

=== Quarterfinals ===
2 August 2023
12:00

Boxscore

Cameroon	77–80	Senegal
Scoring by quarter: 19–11, 13–18, 20–28, 25–23
Pts: Thomas 22; Rebs: Ewodo 9 Asts: Akoa 6		Pts: Dillard 29; Rebs: Diagne 8 Asts: Dillard 6

BK Arena, Kigali
Referees: Claudio Eiuba (ANG), Julio Anaya (PAN), Erick Otieno (KEN)

2 August 2023
15:00

Boxscore

Mali	96–40	Guinea
Scoring by quarter: 24–8, 23–12, 22–11, 27–9
Pts: Haidara 17; Rebs: M. Coulibaly 8 Asts: A. Coulibaly, N'Diaye 4		Pts: Kaba 17; Rebs: Jallow 8 Asts: Jallow 2

BK Arena, Kigali
Referees: Sara El-Sharnouby (EGY), Monicca Nassuuna (UGA), Didier Gaga (RWA)

2 August 2023
18:00

Boxscore

Rwanda	66–61	Uganda
Scoring by quarter: 11–22, 16–6, 24–10, 15–23
Pts: Sifa 19; Rebs: Uwizeye 13; Asts: Crooms, Sifa 5		Pts: Otto 31; Rebs: Akullu, Otto 13; Asts: Otto 4

BK Arena, Kigali
Referees: Joyce Muchenu (ZIM), Nadege Zouzou (CIV), Aya Ahmed (EGY)

2 August 2023
21:00

Boxscore

Nigeria	59–52	Mozambique
Scoring by quarter: 16–18, 13–15, 18–10, 12–9
Pts: Okonkwo 17; Rebs: three players 7 Asts: Okoro 4		Pts: Seda 13; Rebs: Seda 10; Asts: Chiziane, Mafanela 3

BK Arena, Kigali
Referees: Johnny Batista (PUR), Harouna Maïga (BFA), Haytham Ihaqaf (LBA)

=== 5th–8th place semifinals ===
3 August 2023
12:00

Boxscore

Cameroon	74–37	Guinea
Scoring by quarter: 24–4, 18–11, 25–10, 7–12
Pts: Silatsa 13; Rebs: Silatsa 10; Asts: Akoa, Mukoko 5		Pts: Kaba 15; Rebs: Kaba 11; Asts: Kaba, Mbaye 2

BK Arena, Kigali

3 August 2023
15:00

Boxscore

Uganda	62–88	Mozambique
Scoring by quarter: 13–26, 20–16, 22–23, 7–23
Pts: Otto 18; Rebs: Akullu 9 Asts: Akullu 5		Pts: Mucauro 23; Rebs: Seda 11; Asts: Veloso 6

BK Arena, Kigali

=== Semifinals ===
3 August 2023
18:00

Boxscore

Rwanda	48–79	Nigeria
Scoring by quarter: 6–22, 12–22, 17–14, 13–21
Pts: Philoxy 21; Rebs: Butera 11; Asts: Crooms, Philoxy 3		Pts: Okonkwo 23; Rebs: Okonkwo 10; Asts: Ogoke 7

BK Arena, Kigali

3 August 2023
21:00

Boxscore

Senegal	75–65	Mali
Scoring by quarter: 20–16, 16–22, 24–11, 15–16
Pts: Dillard 33; Rebs: Traoré 10; Asts: Dillard 6		Pts: Koné 20; Rebs: Koné 10; Asts: K. Coulibaly 4

BK Arena, Kigali

=== Seventh place game ===
4 August 2023
12:00

Boxscore

Uganda	85–44	Guinea
Scoring by quarter: 14–10, 26–15, 22–16, 23–3
Pts: Otto 21; Rebs: Akello 11; Asts: Akello 3		Pts: Kaba 21; Rebs: Kaba 8 Asts: Mbaye 4

BK Arena, Kigali

=== Fifth place game ===
4 August 2023
15:00

Boxscore

Mozambique	74–65	Cameroon
Scoring by quarter: 14–12, 20–19, 19–14, 21–20
Pts: Seda 16; Rebs: Seda 11; Asts: Mucauro 8		Pts: Thomas 20; Rebs: Akoa 9 Asts: Akoa 10

BK Arena, Kigali

=== Third place game ===
5 August 2023
14:30

Boxscore

Rwanda	51–89	Mali
Scoring by quarter: 15–14, 9–23, 13–23, 14–29
Pts: Philoxy 17; Rebs: Crooms 7 Asts: Kiyobe, Philoxy 4		Pts: Dembélé 14; Rebs: M. Coulibaly 11; Asts: N'Diaye 6

BK Arena, Kigali

=== Final ===
5 August 2023
18:00

Boxscore

Nigeria	84–74	Senegal
Scoring by quarter: 19–10, 24–21, 19–26, 22–17
Pts: Okoro 16; Rebs: Musa 12; Asts: Ogoke, Okoro 4		Pts: Dillard 19; Rebs: Diagne 10; Asts: Dillard 10

BK Arena, Kigali
Referees: Julio Anaya (PAN), Sara El-Sharnouby (EGY), Nadege Zouzou (CIV)

== Final standings ==
Rank	Team	Record
1st place, gold medalist(s)	Nigeria	5–0
2nd place, silver medalist(s)	Senegal	3–3
3rd place, bronze medalist(s)	Mali	4–1
4	Rwanda	2–3
5	Mozambique	4–2
6	Cameroon	3–2
7	Uganda	3–3
8	Guinea	1–5
9	Angola	1–2
10	Egypt	1–2
11	Ivory Coast	1–2
12	DR Congo	0–3

Qualified for the 2024 FIBA Women's Olympic Qualifying Tournaments

== Statistics and awards ==
=== Statistical leaders ===
==== Players ====
Points

Name	PPG
(Uganda) Jannon Otto	21.3
(Egypt) Nadine Mohamed	21.0
(Senegal) Cierra Dillard	20.7
(Angola) Sara Caetano	18.0
(Nigeria) Amy Okonkwo	17.4
(Rwanda) Destiney Philoxy	17.4

Rebounds

Name	RPG
(Angola) Cristina Matiquite	13.0
(Mozambique) Tamara Seda	11.8
(Egypt) Raneem El-Gedawy	10.3
(Angola) Nadir Manuel	9.3
(Guinea) Masseny Kaba	9.3
(Uganda) Melissa Akullu	9.3

Assists

Name	APG
(Angola) Cacia Antonio	6.0
(Senegal) Cierra Dillard	5.5
(Cameroon) Monique Akoa	5.4
(Democratic Republic of the Congo) Ketia Mbelu	5.0
(Egypt) Meral Abdelgawad	4.3

Blocks

Name	BPG
(Egypt) Raneem El-Gedawy	3.0
(Ivory Coast) Grace Tolo	2.7
(Egypt) Fatma Aly	2.0
(Angola) Nadir Manuel	1.7
(Nigeria) Elizabeth Balogun	1.6

Steals

Name	SPG
(Ivory Coast) Djefarima Diawara	3.3
(Mali) Djeneba N'Diaye	3.0
(Mali) Silvia Veloso	2.8
(Mozambique) Alima Dembélé	2.8
seven players	2.7

Efficiency

Name	EFFPG
(Senegal) Cierra Dillard	21.5
(Nigeria) Amy Okonkwo	21.0
(Angola) Cristina Matiquite	19.3
(Mozambique) Tamara Seda	19.2
(Mali) Sika Koné	18.8

==== Teams ====
Points

Team	PPG
Mali	80.4
Nigeria	74.8
Uganda	72.8
Mozambique	72.7
Senegal	72.0

Rebounds

Team	RPG
Uganda	56.2
DR Congo	56.0
Angola	55.0
Nigeria	55.0
Mali	51.4

Assists

Team	APG
Mali	21.8
Mozambique	20.8
Senegal	17.5
Egypt	17.0
Cameroon	16.8
Nigeria	16.8

Blocks

Team	BPG
Egypt	6.3
Nigeria	6.0
Ivory Coast	4.3
Senegal	4.3
Angola	3.7

Steals

Team	SPG
Mali	15.0
Mozambique	13.5
DR Congo	13.3
Ivory Coast	13.3
Angola	11.3

Efficiency

Team	EFFPG
Mali	93.0
Nigeria	88.4
Mozambique	82.8
Senegal	75.3
Cameroon	74.0

=== Awards ===
The awards were announced on 5 August 2023.

All-Tournament Team
Guards	Forwards
(Senegal) Cierra Dillard (Uganda) Jannon Otto	(Nigeria) Amy Okonkwo (Mali) Sika Koné (Mozambique) Tamara Seda
MVP: (Nigeria) Amy Okonkwo
