= 2024–25 Maltese Women's Basketball League =

Women's basketball league in Malta

Maltese Women's Basketball League
- Season: 2024–25
- Dates: Regular season: 9 November 2024 – 15 March 2025; Play Offs: 15 March – 11 May 2025
- Teams: 6

Regular season
- Season MVP: (Rwanda) Janai Crooms

Finals
- Champions: Betsson Depiro (5th title)
- Runners-up: Starlites
- Finals MVP: (Rwanda) Janai Crooms

Statistical leaders
Points	(Rwanda) Janai Crooms	26.5
Rebounds	(Rwanda) Janai Crooms	16.1
Assists	(Malta) Steffi De Martino	3.9
Steals	(United States) Kennedi Williams	4.5
Blocks	(United States) Makaila Napoleon	2.0

The 2024–25 Maltese Women's Basketball League is the top division women's basketball league in Malta. It starts in November 2024 with the first round of the regular season and ends in May 2025.

Caffe Moak Luxol are the defending champions.

Betsson Depiro won their fifth title after beating Starlites in the final.

== Format ==
Each team plays each other three times. The top four teams qualify for the play offs where every round is held as a best of three series.

== Regular season ==
Pos	Team	Pld	W	L	PF	PA	PD	Pts	Qualification
1	Betsson Depiro	15	13	2	1101	842	+259	28	Play Offs
2	Caffe Moak Luxol	15	12	3	1104	819	+285	27	Play Offs
3	Starlites	15	10	5	989	867	+122	25	Play Offs
4	Hibernians	15	7	8	1001	919	+82	22	Play Offs
5	Athleta	15	2	13	742	1098	−356	17	
6	Valletta Lioneses	15	1	14	726	1118	−392	16	

Source: Maltese Women's Basketball League
Rules for classification: 1) Points; 2) Points difference; 3) Points scored.

== Play offs ==
Semifinals
1	Betsson Depiro	89	77	80	2
4	Hibernians	57	80	49	1
2	Caffe Moak Luxol	63	50	0
3	Starlites	76	55	2

Final
1	Betsson Depiro	69	62	58	62	67	3
3	Starlites	64	67	72	60	56	2

Champions of Malta

Betsson Depiro
Fifth title
