= Jane Asinde =

Ugandan basketballer and basketball coach

No. 35 – Azulmarino basketball club
- Title: Forward

Personal information
- Born: 15 October 1999 (age 27)
- Listed height: 188 cm (6 ft 2 in)

Career information
- High school: Buddo S.S.
- College: Grayson College
- Playing career: 2023–present
- Position: Forward
- Number: 35
- Coaching career: 2025–present
Medals
Women's 3x3 basketball
Representing Uganda
Commonwealth Games
Silver medal – second place	2026 Glasgow	Team

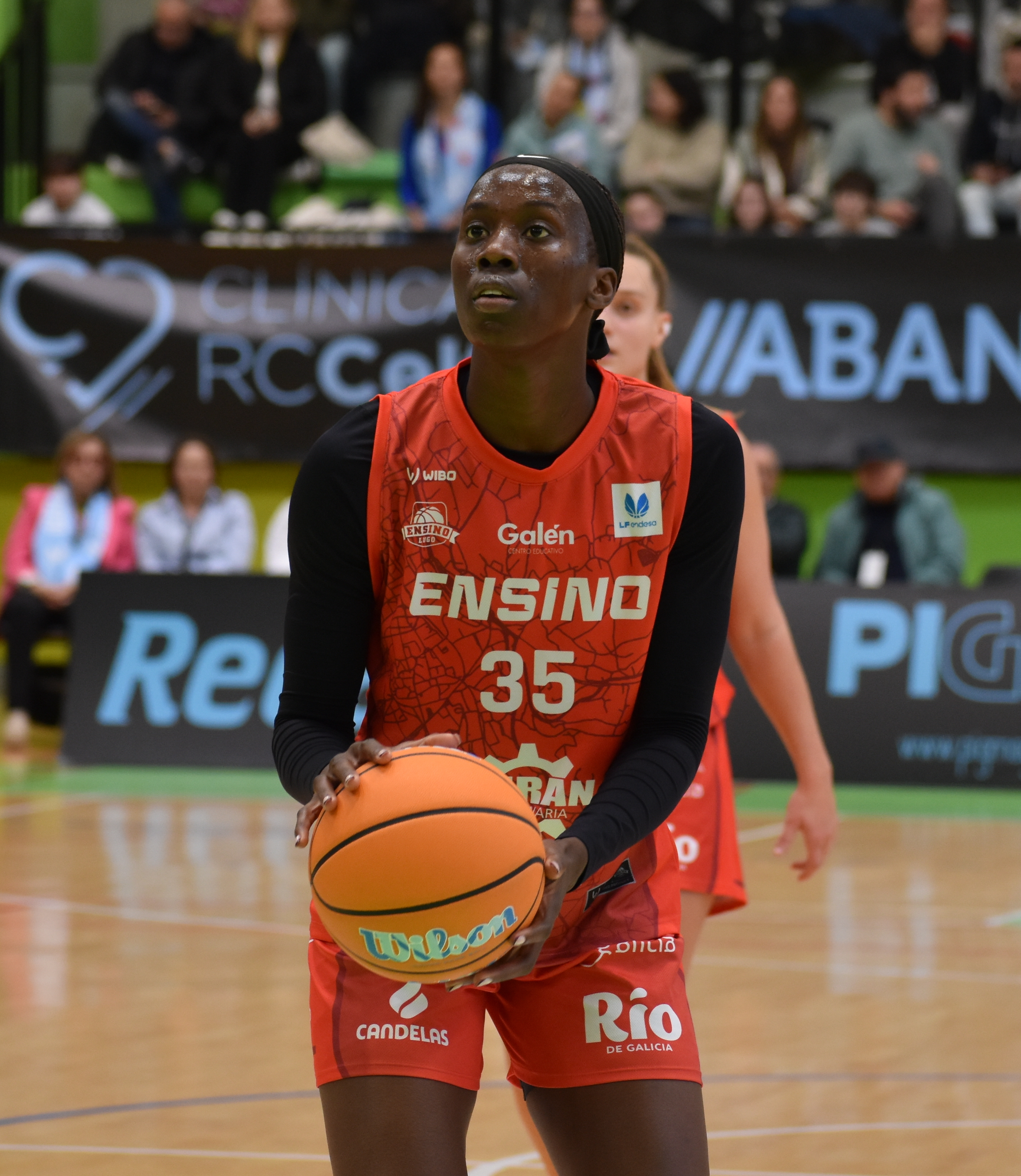

Jane Asinde (born 15 October 1999) is a Ugandan basketballer who plays as a forward for the Azulmarino basketball club in the Spanish second-tier. She is also the captain of the Uganda Women's National basketball team, commonly known as the Gazelles.

== Early life and education ==
Asinde was born to Oloka Chrispin and Janet Athieno from the Eastern district of Tororo. She attended Buddo Secondary School for her secondary school education, she then joined Grayson College in Denison, Texas for a two year Business Administration in 2019. In 2020, she moved to Wichita State University in Kansas where she majored in business studies. In 2023, she joined University of Texas at El Paso, where she graduated with her college diploma in 2024.

== Basketball career ==
Asinde's basketball journey begun while she was at Buddo Senior School. She later joined the Magic stormers basketball club.

=== JKL basketball club (Lady Dolphins) ===
In 2019, Asinde joined the JKL lady dolphins basketball club. She was part of JKL team that won the UCU Invitational tournament. She left after playing nine league games where she proved to be a vital figure for the JKL Lady Dolphins.

Growing up, Asinde was a shy girl in Kampala, Uganda bullied for being quiet and taller than the other kids. Through playing basketball and meeting other people who were her height, Asinde’s confidence began to grow. She found her passion for basketball that was ignited by her older sister, who represented Uganda on the national women’s basketball team. Through her sister’s connection, Asinde was introduced to a coach in the United States, marking the beginning of her basketball journey abroad.

=== Grayson College basketball team ===
In 2019, Asinde left for USA to join Grayson College in Denison, Texas for a two year course in Business Administration, a chance that came with an opportunity to play with Dallas Wings. While at Grayson, she was the 18th rated player in the World Exposure Report Juco rankings and earned WBCA NCJAA First Team All-American honors after a standout sophomore campaign in 2020. She was named the Conference Freshman of the Year 2020, while also earning all-conference and all-region honors for Grayson college basketball team. During her sophomore year, at Grayson College, Asinde visited UTEP and she knew immediately that it was the place where she wanted to finish her collegiate basketball career.

=== Uganda women's national basketball team (the Gazelles) ===
Asinde was regularly called to the Ugandan Senior National Team since 2023. Aside joined the Gazelles for the 2023 FIBA Women's Afrobasket in Kigali, Rwanda on confirmation of the wild card as her first appearance with the Uganda women's national basketball team. She was also part of the Gazelles team that played in the 2025 Women’s AfroBasket Zone V Qualifiers, where she earned the title of Most Valuable Player.

=== Wichita State University women's basketball team (the Shockers) ===
In 2023, Asinde became the second female basketball player out of Uganda to join and play for a National Collegiate Athletic Association (NCAA) Division I school when she joined Wichita State University from Grayson College. Asinde had a game-high of 20 points and eight rebounds which helped Wichita register a historical win over top-seeded South Florida in the Quarterfinals of the American Athletic Conference Championship. During the 2022-23 season, Asinde was named on the All-Conference third team. Asinde played in 60 games and started in 53 of them.

=== University of Texas at El Paso women's basketball team (UTEP Miners) ===
In August 2023, Asinde joined the University of Texas at El Paso ahead of the 2023-24 NCAA season. During her time at UTEP Asinde played in the forward position. As a senior, she was a Third Team All-Conference selection to both the All-Conference First Team and the All-Defensive Team, averaging a team-high 13.1 points and 9.8 rebounds per game. At UTEP, Asinde linked up with coach Keitha Adams under whom she worked at Wichita during her two seasons with the Shockers. She was named CUSA (Conference USA) Newcomer of the Year while also earning a spot on the All-Conference First Team and All-Defensive Team in 2023 and CUSA(Conference USA) Player of the Week on February 26 after two impressive showings at LA Tech (22 February 2024) and Sam Houston (24 February 2024). In 2024, Asinde finished her collegiate career with 1,151 points with the UTEP Miners.

=== JKL basketball club (Lady Dolphins) ===
In 2024, Asinde returned to JKL Lady Dolphins from UTEP, for a short three months in preparation for the National Basketball League playoffs and helped JKL defend their league title against Uganda Christian University's Lady Canons with a 4-2 lead, a fourth championship in the club’s history. She also mentioned in an interview after the game that she going to play her first pro-basketball for a club in China.

=== Henan Phoenix basketball club ===
In 2024, Asinde officially signed with Chinese basketball club Henan Phoenix, marking the beginning of her professional basketball career in China. Henan Phoenix is a Chinese professional women’s basketball club based in Henan, playing in the Women’s Chinese Basketball Association (WCBA). Henan Phoenix agreed terms with Asinde to play for the 2024-25 season and it will be her first season as a pro.

=== Ensino Lugo basketball club ===
Asinde joined Ensino Lugo basketball club in February 2025 after leaving the Chinese team, Henan Phoenix. A week after leading Uganda women’s national basketball team, the Gazelles to victory in the 2025 Women's AfroBasket Zone V tournament, Captain Asinde signed with Durán Maquinaria Ensino Lugo in Spain. In May 2025, Asinde abruptly concluded her time with the Spanish top-flight club, Ensino Lugo CB.

=== Azul Marino Sant Josep Palma De Mallorca ===
Azul Marino Sant Josep Palma de Mallorca (Spanish Liga Femenina Challenge) strengthened their roster with the addition of Asinde for the 2025-26 season. She played last season at Ensino in the Spanish Liga Femenina Endesa.

=== Coaching ===
In 2025, Asinde moved back to Uganda as a guest coach working with the iHoops Basketball holiday program at Fast Sports indoor court in Kampala.

== Awards and recognitions ==
- Conference Freshman of the Year 2020.
- CUSA (Conference USA) Newcomer of the Year while also earning a spot on the All-Conference First Team and All-Defensive Team.
- CUSA (Conference USA) Player of the Week on February 26 after two impressive showings at LA Tech (22 February 2024) and Sam Houston (22 February 2024).
- Most Valuable Player for the 2025 Women’s AfroBasket Zone V Qualifiers.

== See also ==
- Jannon Otto
- Hope Akello
- Priscilla Abey
- Melissa Akullu
