= Ifunanya =

- Gender: Female
- Language: Igbo

Origin
- Origin: Igbo
- Meaning: Love
- Region of origin: Igboland

Other names
- Short form: Ify

Ifunanya audio is a feminine Igbo name with its roots in Igboland. Ifunanya means "love".

== Notable people with the name ==
- Ifunanya Okoro (born 1999), Nigerian women basketball player
- Ifunanya Ibekwe (born 1989), Nigerian basketball player
