= Imanishimwe =

Imanishimwe is a surname. Notable people with the surname include:

- Emmanuel Imanishimwe (born 1995), Rwandan footballer
- Ritah Imanishimwe (born 1996), Ugandan basketball player
