= Olaoluwatomi Taiwo =

American basketball player (born 2000)

Esgueira
- Position: Guard

Personal information
- Born: 16 June 2000 (age 26) Carmel, Indiana, U.S.
- Listed height: 5 ft 10 in (1.78 m)

Career information
- High school: Carmel (Carmel, Indiana)
- College: Iowa (2018–2022); TCU (2022–2023)

Olaoluwatomi Oluwayemisi Taiwo (born 16 June 2000) is a Nigerian-American basketball player. She played college basketball at Iowa and TCU.

== High school career ==
Taiwo attended Carmel High School in Carmel, Indiana, and led the basketball team to the Indiana region finals. In her senior year, she was named an honorable mention for American Family Insurance All-USA Central Indiana girls basketball preseason Super Team. She was a two-time honorable mention AP all-state selection.

== College career ==
Olaoluwatomi played for the University of Iowa for four years before transferring to TCU. At Iowa, she was a three-time Academic All-Big Ten performer (2019-20, 2020-21, 2021-22).

== Professional career ==
She plays for Customs since 2023, joined a Portugal-Liga Feminina Women team named Esgueira Aveiro in 2024.

== National team career ==
In 2023, she represented Nigeria where she and Amy Okonkwo secured the D'Tigress a chance to the Women's AfroBasket final after the victory against Rwanda.
