= Adenike Olawuyi =

Nigerian basketball player (born 2004)

PEAC-Pécs
- Position: Center

Personal information
- Born: 8 February 2004 (age 22)
- Listed height: 6 ft 3 in (1.91 m)

Olawuyi Adenike Olayemi (born 8 February 2004) is a Nigerian basketball player for the Nigerian national team.

== Early life ==
Adenike was born in Osogbo, Osun State.

== Career ==
In 2018, Adenike won a scholarship worth $45,000 for emerging as the Most Promising Player at the Olumide Oyedeji Basketball Camp, Lagos.

She played for [Rátgéber Kosárlabda Akadémia] from 2018 to 2022, and moved to playing for NKA Universitas PEAC I in 2023 till present.

Adenike played for Nigeria in the 2023 Women's Afrobasket where Nigeria won the Championship title the fourth consecutive time and sixth overall title during the tournament.
