= Priscilla Abey =

Ugandan basketball player (born 1999)

UTEP Miners
- Position: Forward

Personal information
- Born: 22 December 1999 (age 25); Kampala, Uganda
- Listed height: 6 ft 0 in (1.83 m)

Priscilla Abey (born 22 December 1999) is a Ugandan basketball player for the Uganda women's National team.

== College career ==
As a second year student at Grayson College, Priscilla made four starts in six appearances, averaging 8.5 points and 8.0 rebounds per game, averaged 11.4 points and 7.9 rebounds in freshman campaign, had 27 points and 9 rebounds against Oklahoma Wesleyan.

In 2023, she signed to UTEP where she will join the team for the 2024–25 season.

== National team career ==
She played for the Ugandan national team at the 2023 Women's Afrobasket.
