= Lydia Babirye =

Ugandan basketball player (born 2004)

Personal information
- Born: 21 November 2004 (age 21)
- Listed height: 5 ft 9 in (1.75 m)

Career information
- High school: Victory Christian Center (Charlotte, North Carolina)
- College: Evangel University (2023–2024)
- Position: Guard

Lydia Babirye (born November 21, 2004) is a Ugandan basketball player who plays as a guard for Evangel University Athletics and Uganda women's national basketball team.

== Career history ==
Babirye attended Victory Christian Center in Charlotte, North Carolina, where she played basketball from 2018 to 2019 season to 2022–2023 season.

She joined the Evangel University for the 2023–2024 season. She was part of the Evangel University squad the plays against Ottawa University on 21 February 2024.

== Uganda national team ==
Babirye first represented Uganda in 2019 during FIBA U16 women's African championship and was called to the senior national team in 2023 during 2023 women's Afrobasket. Babirye was part of the Uganda squad that defeated Senegal in Kigali in the 2023 women's Afrobasket.
