= Aicha Ndour =

Senegalese basketball player (born 2000)

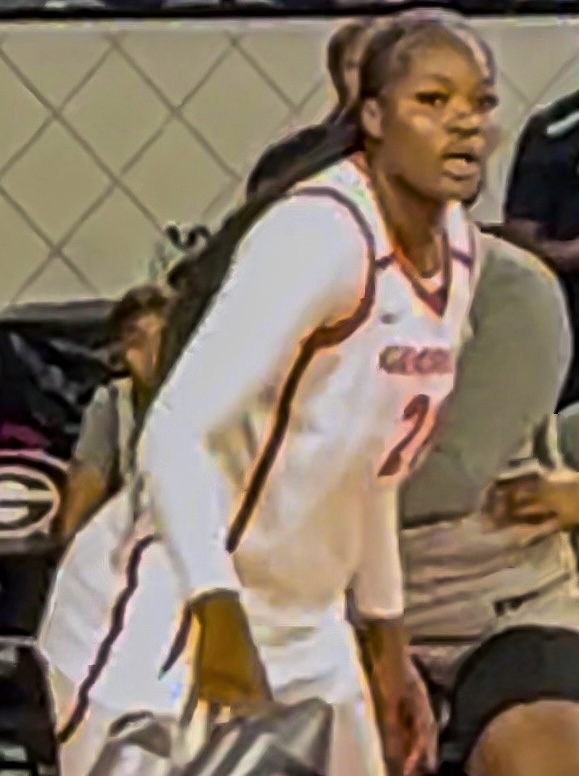
- Ndour in 2025

No. 21 – Georgia Lady Bulldogs
- Position: Center

Personal information
- Born: 14 August 2000 (age 26) Somone, Senegal
- Listed height: 6 ft 6 in (1.98 m)

Career information
- High school: Cushing Academy (Massachusetts)
- College: Rutgers (2020–2021); Illinois (2022–2024); Wichita State (2024–2025); Georgia (2025–present)
- Playing career: 2020–present

Aicha Ndour (born 14 August 2000) is a Senegalese basketball player who plays center for the Georgia Lady Bulldogs basketball team and Senegal women's national basketball team.

== Career history ==
Ndour attended Cushing Academy in Massachusetts where she played basketball and volleyball.

Ndour was laughed at the first time she picked up a basketball. She joined SEED Academy when she was 16 years old. Ndour joined NBA Academy participants from Africa, Australia, China, India and Mexico in April 2019. Because of criticisms, she decided to leave her local court to play basketball in the United States, which makes her the first person from Somone to play college hoops in the U.S. at the Division-I level.

Ndour joined Rutgers Scarlet Knights in 2020–2021, where she played one season. She says she choose Rutgers because she saw the team as a sense of family and could assist her to achieve her dreams. After the season, she transferred to Illinois Fighting Illini for the 2022–2023 season. In the 2022–2023 season, she appeared in 23 games with an average of 1.5 points and 1.6 rebounds per game. During the 2023–2024 season at Illinois, she averaged 1.3 points, 0.8 rebounds, 0.0 assists, 0.1 steals and 0.3 blocks per game.

She transferred to Wichita State for the 2024–25 season. She transferred again as a graduate student to Georgia for the 2025–26 season.

== Senegal national team ==
Ndour first represented Senegal in 2023 when she was called up for 2023 Women's Afrobasket. She appeared in 5 games with 0.4 points per game, 1.4 rebounds per game, 0.2 assist per game and playing efficiency of 1.2.
