= Mathilde Diop =

Senegalese basketball player (born 1997)

Personal information
- Born: 15 June 1997 (age 29) Dakar, Senegal
- Listed height: 6 ft 2 in (1.88 m)

Career information
- High school: Lycee Gambetta; (Arras), France
- College: Arizona Western College (2017–2019); University of Colorado (2019–2023); Neuss (2024–present)
- NBA draft: 2019: undrafted
- Playing career: 2017–present
- Position: Forward

Mathilde Diop (born June 15, 1997) is a Senegalese basketball player who is playing forward for Neuss in Germany and Senegal women's national basketball team.

== Personal life ==
Diop parents are Mouhamadou Moustapha Diop and Maximiana Lopez Diop. Her father was an Olympian in Senegal who played basketball for Stade Francais. Apart from playing basketball, she also like music, netflix and eating.

== Career history ==
She attended Lycee Gambetta in Arras, France and graduated in 2015.

Diop described her basketball journey as a rough one. According to Diop, her father is the first person who put basketball in her hands. She played for Arizona Western College before joining University of Colorado. She played 27 games during 2018–2019 season with 10.7 minutes, 0.8 points per game, 1.9 rebounds per game, 0.7 assist per game, 0.4 steals per game, 0.5 blocks per game, 0.8 assist to turnover ratio, 33.3 field goal percentage, 0.0 3 field goals made-attempted per game, 30.0 free throws made-attempted per game and playing efficiency of 0.9. She have been transferred to Neuss for the 2024–2025 season.

== Senegal national team ==
Diop first represented Senegal in 2023 when she was called for 2023 women's Afrobasket where she played 5 games with 3.6 points per game, 1.4 rebounds per game, 0.4 assist per game and playing efficiency of 4. She was again called in 2024 for 2024 FIBA women's olympic qualifying tournament where she played 2 games with 6 points per game, 1.5 rebounds per game, 1.5 assist per game and playing efficiency of 6.
