= Claire Lamunu =

Ugandan female basketball player

Kenya Ports Authority women's basketball team
- Title: Center

Personal information
- Born: 24 December 1993 (age 32)
- Listed height: 185 cm (6 ft 1 in)

Career information
- High school: Mount St. Mary's Namagunga
- College: Vanguard University
- Playing career: 2012–present
- Position: Power Forward
- Coaching career: 2023–present

Career history

Playing
- 2008- 2012: Hawkes
- 2012- 2013: Gladiators
- 2013- 2015: KCCA
- 2014 to date: Gazelles
- 2015- 2017: Vanguard University
- 2017- 2018: Boa Viagrem-Angra- Acore
- 2018- 2020: Kouvottaret
- 2020- to date: Kenya Ports Authority

Coaching
- 2023-present: Azusa Pacific University’s Women Basketball team

Claire Lamunu also known as Claire Gloria Lamunu (born 24 December 1993), is a Ugandan basketball player who plays as a center for the Kenya Ports Authority women's basketball team, commonly known as KPA. She also plays as a forward on the Uganda women's national basketball team, commonly known as the Gazelles.

== Early life and education ==
Lamunu was born to George Ocaya Onen and Laruni Filder Ocaya. Her father, George, is a former football and basketball player, while her mother, Filder, is a former netball player. Lamunu is the 6th born of 10 children.

=== Education ===
Lamunu attended Dade Nursery School in Luzira for her nursery education, St. Kizito Primary School in Bugolobi from primary one to primary three, and St. Angella Primary School in Kisaasi from primary four to primary seven. She attended Mount St. Mary’s Namagunga Secondary School for OLevel & ALevel education. She pursued a Bachelor of Science in Bio-Medical Engineering at Makerere University from 2013 to 2015. She graduated with a bachelor's degree in 2017 at Vanguard University.

=== Personal life ===
On 6 February 2022, Lamunu married Kyler Kennedy, whom she had dated since 2018.

== Basketball career ==
Lamunu started playing basketball at Mount St. Mary's Namagunga Secondary School, where she also participated in other games like handball, football, volleyball, hockey, and netball. She played for the Gulu Hawkes basketball team in 2008 before joining the Gladiators basketball club in 2012.

=== Gladiators ===
In 2012, Lamunu's basketball career debuted when the Gladiators basketball club played against the Makerere University basketball team, also known as MUK Sparks. This marked the beginning of her competitive basketball career, earning her the nickname "Little Gazelle."

=== Gazelles ===
In 2014, Lamunu was part of the Gazelles team that won the 2014 Afrobasket qualifiers. She has since been part of the Uganda Women’s National Basketball team, where she made appearances at the 2014 FIBA 3X3 World Championships, 2018 FIBA 3X3 World Cup, 2019 FIBA 3X3 World Cup qualifiers, 2019 FIBA 3X3 World Cup, and 2025 Women's Afrobasket tournament.

=== KCCA ===
Lamunu played joined the Kampala City Council Authority women's basketball team, also known as the KCCA Leopards in 2013. In 2014, she was named the 2014 FIBA Afrobasket Zone V Most Valuable Player, the 2014 National Basketball League finals Most Valuable Player, and the 2014 Uganda Sports Press Association Female Basketball Player of the Year. KCCA Leopards won the 2014 Pepsi Women's National Basketball League, where Lamunu was named the best player on the team and Most Valuable Player.

=== Vanguard University ===
Lamunu traveled to the US in 2015 after being awarded a four-year basketball scholarship at the Vanguard University of Southern California. Lamunu not only played college basketball, but she also pursued a bachelor's degree in Biochemistry. She was in her third year, pursuing a bachelor's degree in biomedical engineering at Makerere University. While at Vanguard University, she was once named the Golden State Athletic Conference (GSAC) player of the week, which helped Vanguard University make it to the NAIA Division 1 final four. She was selected WBCA NAIA Player of the Year, WBCA All-NAIA Player of the Year and voted to the NAIA Division I All-Championship 1st Team. Lamunu was named the Women's Basketball Coaches Association player of the year for the 2026-2017 season in her senior year at Vanguard.

=== Boa Viagem-Angra-Acore ===
Lamunu was signed by Portuguese top league (Liga Feminina) side Boa Viagem-Angra-Acore for the 2017-2018 season, during which she won four awards.

=== Finland Kouvottaret ===
From Portugal, she moved to Finland's Kouvottaret, where COVID-19 disrupted her two-year deal.

=== Kenya Ports Authority ===
Lamunu is currently playing for the Kenya Ports Authority basketball club as their center.

=== Coaching career ===
Lamunu coached Azusa Pacific University’s Women's Basketball team in 2023.

== Awards and recognitions ==
- Nationals (Uganda) Best Rebounder- 2011
- National (Uganda) Qualifiers Top Scorer- 2011
- Zuku (Uganda) University Basketball League Finals- 2014
- MVP and Best Defensive Player -2014
- FIBA Afrobasket Zone V MVP -2014
- National Basketball League finals MVP- 2014
- Uganda Sports Press Association Female Basketball Player of the Year 2014
- Best player on the team and Most Valuable Player -2014
- Most Valuable Player (MVP) Award winner for the national team- 2015
- Uganda Gazelles in the Zone 5 Club Championships - 2015
- Makerere University at the Inter-University Games- 2015
- WBCA NAIA Player of the Year- 2017
- WBCA All-NAIA Player of the Year- 2017
- Voted to NAIA Division I All-Championship 1st Team- 2017
- Golden State Athletic Conference (GSAC) player of the week - 2017

== See also ==
- Maria Najjuma
- Brenda Ekone
- Flavia Oketcho
- Lydia Babirye
