= Farida El-Sherif =

Egyptian basketball player

Farida El-Sherif (born 7 October 1998) is an Egyptian basketball player who plays for the Egyptian women's basketball team and also Sporting Club in Egypt. Farida is 5 feet 11 inches tall, which is equivalent to 180cm. She played for Al Shams on 2022/2023 season, and also plays as a Forward.

== International career highlights ==
=== National Team Senior ===
In the 2023 FIBA Women's AfroBasket, she played 1 game, with no points, rebounds, assists, and an efficiency rating of -1. During the 2023 FIBA Women's AfroBasket qualifiers, she participated in 4 games, averaging 1.3 points, 1.3 rebounds, 0.8 assists, and an efficiency rating of 1.5. At the 2021 FIBA Women's Afrobasket - Qualifiers - Zone 5, she played 5 games, averaging 3.4 points, 1.8 rebounds, 1 assist, and an efficiency rating of 6. Overall, her total averages for the national team senior level are 1.9 points, 1.2 rebounds, 0.7 assists, and an efficiency rating of 2.8.
