= Evelyne Nakiyingi =

Ugandan basketball player (born 1998)

Personal information
- Born: 2 November 1998 (age 28)
- Listed height: 5 ft 6 in (1.68 m)

Career information
- High school: JKL Dolphins
- NBA draft: 2020: undrafted
- Playing career: 2018-2022–present
- Position: Guard
- Number: 9

Evelyne Nakiyingi (born 2 November 1998) is a Ugandan basketball player who plays as a guard for JKL Dolphins and Ugandan women's national basketball team.

== Career history ==
Nakiyingi was on the JKL Dolphins squad that plays FIBA Africa women's basketball league qualifiers.

She first represented Uganda in 2023 when she was called up for FIBA women's Afrobasketball-qualifiers. She was part of the final roster for the Gazelles team that represent Uganda during 2023 women's Afrobasket in Kigali, Rwanda that takes place from 28th July 2023 to 6th August 2023.
