= Adebola Adeyeye =

Nigerian basketball player (born 1999)

Personal information
- Born: 10 November 1999 (age 27) Brampton, Ontario, Canada
- Listed height: 1.88 m (6 ft 2 in)

Career information
- College: Kentucky Wildcats

Career history
- Nigeria

Adebola Adeyeye (born November 10, 1999) is a basketball player. Born in Canada, she represents Nigeria at international level. At the collegiate level she played on the Kentucky Wildcats women's basketball team. She played for Concorde Olympique Trith Basket Porte du Hainaut in French NF1 (2023–2024).

== Early life ==
Adebola Adeyeye was born in Brampton, Ontario in Canada.

During her time in high school, she participated in three seasons of basketball at the Rock School in Florida, serving as team captain during one of those seasons. In her senior year, she competed in 28 games, achieving averages of 16.1 points, 17.9 rebounds, 3.0 blocks, and 2.1 steals per game. Remarkably, she maintained a 58 percent shooting accuracy from the field. Throughout her three-year tenure at the Rock School, she consistently delivered double-double performances, averaging 12.0 points and 13.3 rebounds per game while maintaining a shooting percentage of 56 percent.

From 2019 to 2022, played for Buffalo Bulls women's basketball, participating in 116 games and maintaining averages of 4.8 points and 5.1 rebounds per game throughout her collegiate career. During her freshman year, she participated in 33 games and maintaining averages of 2.0 points and 3.0 rebounds per game. In her sophomore season she averaged 5.9 points and 6.6 rebounds per game. In her junior year, she played in 24 games, averaging 5.0 points and 4.6 rebounds per game while maintaining a 57 percent field goal percentage and securing 15 blocks. In her final year at Buffalo she averaged 6.1 points and 6.5 rebounds per game, ultimately aiding the Bulls in securing the 2022 MAC Championships title and securing a spot in the NCAA Tournament. She also achieved her career-high point total against Akron, scoring 17 points with an 8-of-8 shooting record from the field, accompanied by four rebounds. Additionally, she recorded a double-double performance against Akron earlier in the season, tallying 16 points and 10 rebounds. Throughout the season, she achieved ten or more points on nine occasions, including three double-doubles. In a game against Oklahoma, she posted a double-double with 12 points and 13 rebounds, along with two steals.

In April 2022, Adeyeye committed to play for the University of Kentucky.
