= Madjiguene Sene =

Senegalese basketball player (born 1994)

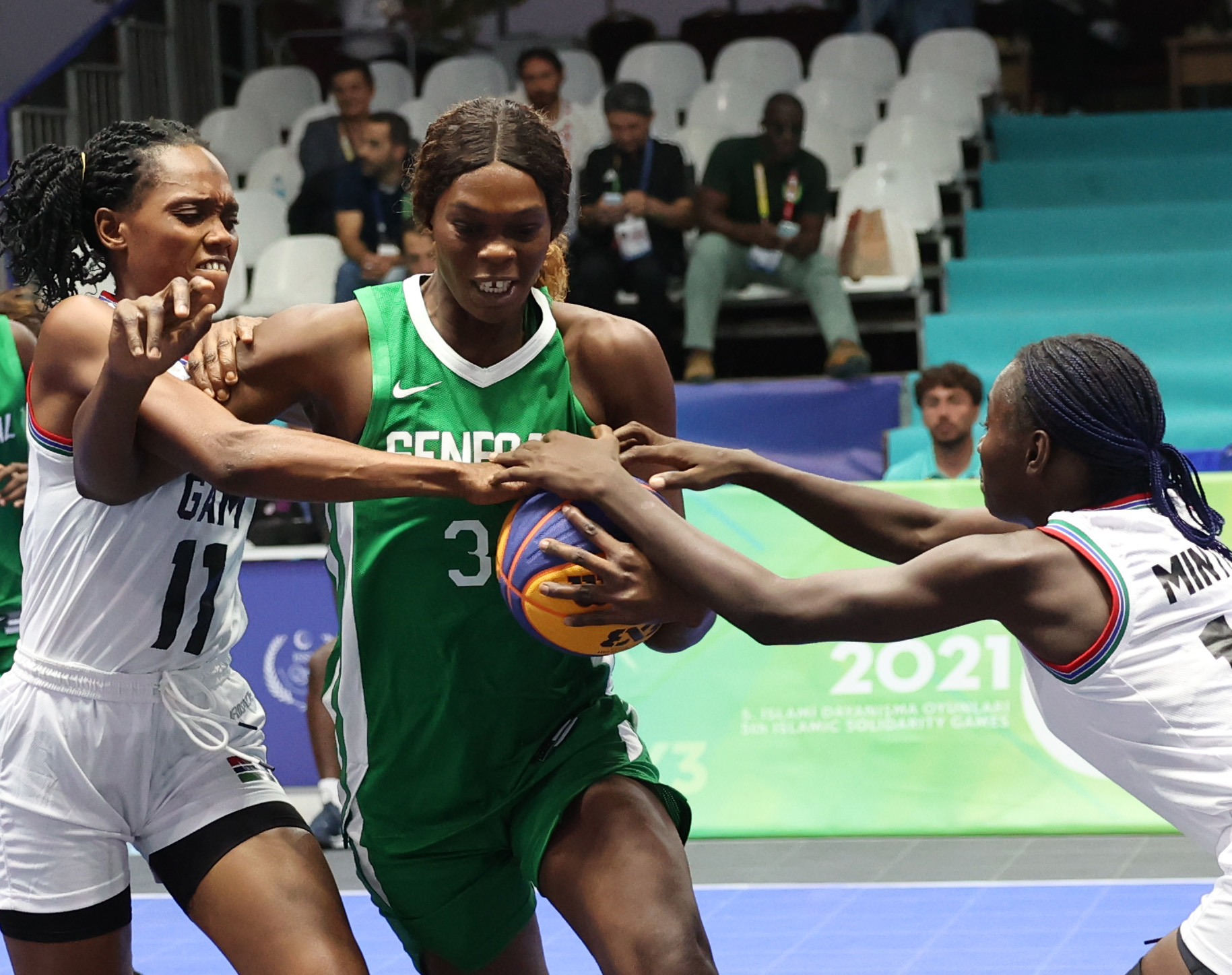

Personal information
- Born: 25 October 1994 (age 32) Dakar, Senegal
- Listed height: 6 ft 6 in (1.98 m)

Career information
- NBA draft: 2016: undrafted
- Position: Center

Career history
- 2017–2018: ISEG sports
- 2019–2020: Furdenheim
- 2021–2022: Escaudain
- 2022–present: ASA Sceaux basket Feminin

Madjiguene Sene (born October 25, 1994) is a Senegalese basketball player who plays center for ASA Sceaux basket Feminin in France and Senegal women's national basketball team.

== Career history ==
Sene plays for ISEG sports during the 2017–2018 season before joining Furdenheim in 2019-2020 where she play one season. She was part of the squad that plays against CB IFS which ended a home won of 62-56 for Furdenheim. She set a record of 21 points and 21 rebounds on that match. After the season she was transferred to Escaudain for 2021–2022 season. she was again transferred to ASA Sceaux basket Feminin during the 2022–2023 season.

== Senegal national team ==
Madjiguene Sene first represented Senegal in 2021 when she was called up for 2021 women's Afrobasket where she played 5 games with 4.2 points per game, 3.8 rebounds per game, 0.6 assist per game and playing efficiency of 5.4. She was again called up for 2023 women's Afrobasket where she played 4 games with 1.5 points per game, 1.5 rebounds per game, 0.3 assist per game and 1.3 playing efficiency.
