= Jannon Otto =

Ugandan-American basketball player

Jannon Jaye Otto
No. 1 – Embutidos Pajariel Bembibre PDM
- Position: Point guard
- League: Liga Femenina de Baloncesto

Personal information
- Born: April 14, 1997 (age 29)
- Listed height: 183 cm (6 ft 0 in)

Career information
- High school: Oak Hills (Victorville, California)
- College: New Mexico (2015–2016); UC Riverside (2017–2019)
- Playing career: 2020–present

Career history
- 2020–2021: Dafni Agiou Dimitriou
- 2021–2022: TSV Towers Speyer-Schifferstadt
- 2022: Rockhamptons Cyclones
- 2022–2023: Musel Pikes
- 2023: Eastern Mavericks
- 2023–present: Embutidos Pajariel Bembibre PDM

Jannon Jaye Otto (born April 14, 1997) is an American-Ugandan professional basketball player. She plays for the Uganda women's national basketball team and the Spanish side Embutidos Pajariel Bembibre PDM.

== Early life ==
Otto was born in California. She attended Oak Hill High School. She scored over 2000 points in her High School Career.

== College career ==
Otto played for the New Mexico Lobos women's basketball in 2015–16. She moved to UC Riverside Highlanders women's basketball team in 2016 where she played from 2017 to 2019.

== Professional career ==
Otto started her career at the Greek side Dafni Agiou Dimitriou in 2020. She played the 2021-22 season at the German Side TSV Towers Speyer-Schifferstadt in the second German Bundesliga, where she averaged 25.5 points and 12.5 rebounds per game. She played for the Australian side Rockhampton Cyclones in 2022 where she averaged 18.9 points, 7.5 rebounds and 1.9 assists per game. Otto played for the Musel Pikes Women's basketball team from August 2022 to February 2023. Her contract was terminated by the club due to her decision to leave and play at the 2023 Fiba Zone Five Women Afrobasket qualifiers for the Ugandan National Women's Basketball team without the club granting her the right to participate. She later joined the Eastern Mavericks Women's team in Australia. She joined the spanish side Embutidos Pajariel Bembibre PDM in June 2023

== Uganda women's national basketball team ==
Otto naturalized to play for Uganda. She Joined Uganda women's national basketball team in the 2023 Fiba Zone Five Women Afrobasket qualifiers where she averaged 17.4 points, 10.2 rebounds and 3 assists. She participated in the 2023 Women's Afrobasket where she finished as the tournament's highest scorer with 128 points. She averaged 21.3 points, 7.5 rebounds and 2.5 assists. She was also named 5 player All star team of the tournament.

== Personal life ==
Otto is the daughter of Kelly Hennessy, a former University of North Dakota basketball player.
