= Ineza Sifa =

Rwandan basketball player (born 2002)

Personal information
- Born: 14 March 2002 (age 24) Musanze, Rwanda
- Listed height: 5 ft 11 in (1.80 m)

Career information
- High school: Greenforest Christian Academy (Decatur, Georgia)
- College: FIU (2022–2023); Middle Tennessee (2023–present)
- Position: Guard

Ineza Sifa (born March 14, 2002) is a Rwandan basketball player who plays as a guard for the Middle Tennessee Blue Raiders and the Rwanda women's national basketball team.

== Career history ==
Sifa attended Greenforest Christian Academy in Decatur, Georgia, where she played basketball

On 17 November 2021, Sifa Ineza Joyeuse committed to play college basketball at FIU during the early signing period. She transferred to Middle Tennessee after the season.

== Rwanda national team ==
Sifa first represented Rwanda in 2018 when she was called up for U-18 national team to play FIBA U-18 women's African championship. She was again called to the senior national team during the 2019 FIBA Women's Afrobasket- Qualifiers, 2021 FIBA Women's Afrobasket-Qualifiers-Zone 5 and 2023 Women's Afrobasket.
