= Rwanda women's national basketball team =

Rwanda
- FIBA ranking: 74 ▼2 (18 March 2026)
- Joined FIBA: 1977
- FIBA zone: FIBA Africa
- National federation: Fédération Rwandaise de Basketball Amateur
- Coach: Cheikh Sarr

AfroBasket
- Appearances: 4
Home	Away

The Rwanda women's national basketball team represents Rwanda in international competitions. It is administered by the Fédération Rwandaise de Basketball Amateur (FERWABA).

== African Championship record ==
- 2009 – 9th
- 2011 – 9th
- 2023 – 4th
- 2025 – 11th

== Current roster ==
Roster for the 2025 Women's Afrobasket.

Rwanda men's national basketball team roster
Players
Coaches

Pos.	No.	Name	Age – Date of birth	Height	Club	Ctr.
SG	2	Rosine Micomyiza	30 – 9 May 1995	1.62 m (5 ft 4 in)	REG BBC	(Rwanda)
PG	3	Destiney Philoxy	22 – 25 October 2000	1.72 m (5 ft 8 in)	REG BBC	(Rwanda)
C	5	Bella Murekatete	25 – 4 July 2000	1.92 m (6 ft 4 in)	AE Sedis Bàsquet	(Spain)
C	10	Hope Butera	22 – 10 February 2001	1.97 m (6 ft 6 in)	CAB Estepona	(Spain)
PG	12	Odile Tetero	27 – 24 February 1998	1.59 m (5 ft 3 in)	REG BBC	(Rwanda)
PF	14	Ange Irakoze	21 – 24 December 2003	1.81 m (5 ft 11 in)	REG BBC	(Rwanda)
PG	20	Faustine Mwizerwa	24 – 26 April 2001	1.65 m (5 ft 5 in)	Free agent
PF	22	Assouma Uwizeye	29 – 6 April 1996	1.82 m (6 ft 0 in)	APR BBC	(Rwanda)
PG	23	Irakoze Stephanie	21 – 19 June 2004	1.66 m (5 ft 5 in)	APR BBC	(Rwanda)
F	24	Keisha Hampton	35 – 22 February 1990	1.87 m (6 ft 2 in)	Virtus Eirene Ragusa	(Italy)
C	26	Rebecca Cyuzuzo	17 – 29 September 2007	1.92 m (6 ft 4 in)	The Hoops Rwanda	(Rwanda)
SG	77	Gloriose Byukusenge	24 – 12 April 2001	1.68 m (5 ft 6 in)	REG BBC	(Rwanda)

Head coach

- (Senegal) Cheikh Sarr

Assistant coach(es)

- (Rwanda) Patrick Habiyambere
- (Rwanda) Esperance Mukaneza

Legend

- Club – describes last
  club before the competition
- Age – describes age
  on 26 July 2025

== See also ==
- Rwanda women's national under-19 basketball team
- Rwanda women's national under-17 basketball team
