= Hibernians Basketball Club =

- Leagues: Division One Basketball
- Founded: 1984; 42 years ago
- Location: Paola, Malta
- Website: Official website
Home	Away

Hibernians Basketball Club, also known as Hibs, is a sports club located in Paola, Malta. The team competes in Malta's Division One Basketball league.

== Notable players ==
- Set a club record or won an individual award as a professional player.
- Played at least one official international match for his senior national team at any time.

- (Malta) Marko Matijevic
- (Malta) Cuschieri Patus
- (Malta) Roderick Vella
- (Serbia) Ivan Demcesen

== See also ==
- Hibernians F.C.
