= Edwige Djedjemel =

Ivorian basketball player

Personal information
- Born: 28 October 1988 (age 38) Yopougon, Ivory Coast

Career history
- ?: CS d'Abidjan

Edwige Djedjemel (born 28 October 1988) is an Ivorian female professional basketball player.
