= Alima Dembélé =

Malian basketball player (born 2000)

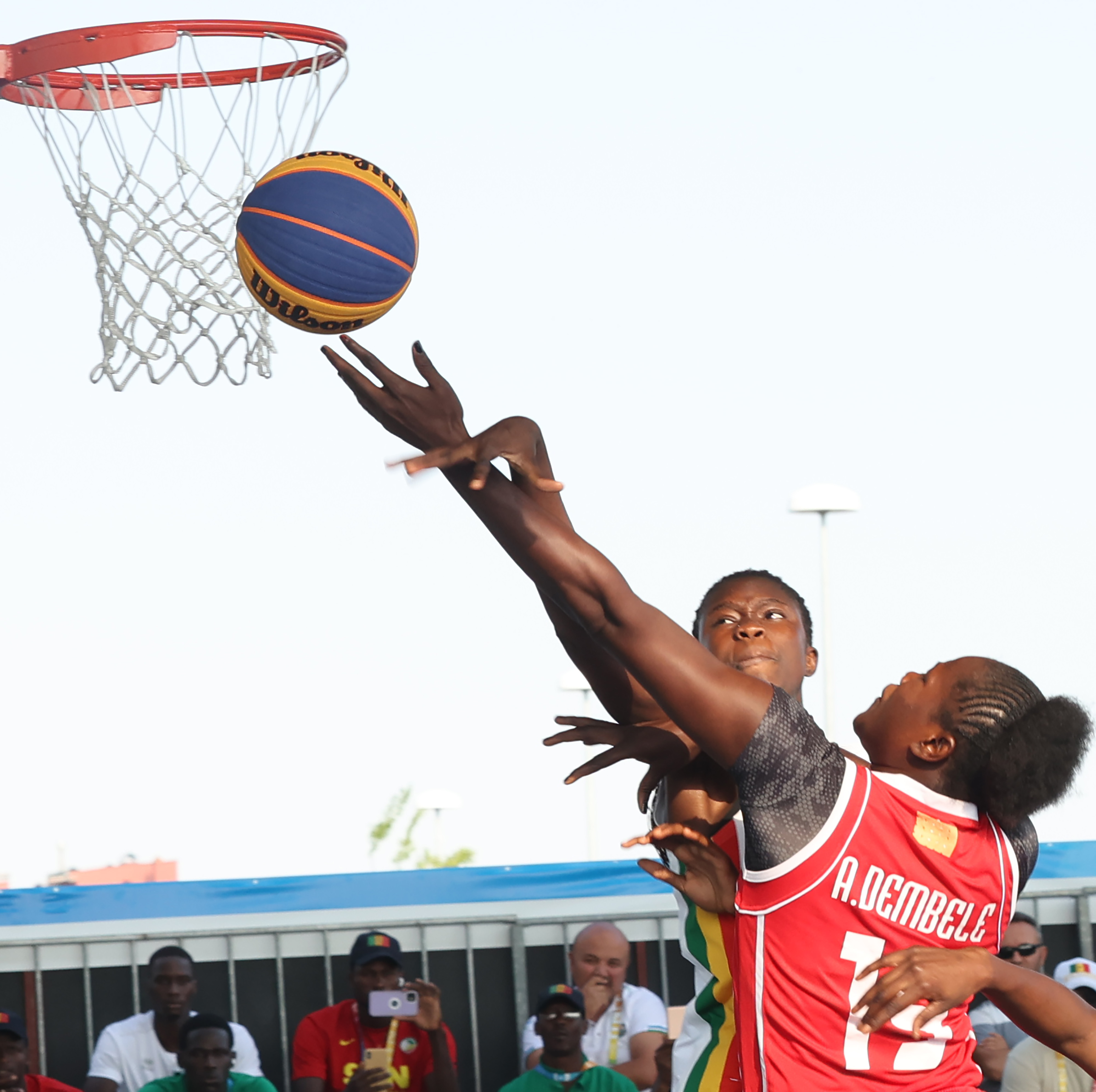

Personal information
- Born: 20 January 2000 (age 26)
- Listed height: 6 ft 1 in (1.85 m)

Career information
- WNBA draft: 2022: undrafted
- Playing career: 2019–present
- Position: Forward

Career history
- 2019-2020: Magnectias Contra Violence Genero
- 2020-2021: Vega Lagunera Adareva
- 2021-2022: Innova-TSN Leganes
- 2022-2023: IDK Eustokren San sebastian
Medals
Women's basketball
Representing Mali
AfroBasket
Silver medal – second place	2025 Ivory Coast
Women's 3x3 basketball
Islamic Solidarity Games
Silver medal – second place	2021 Konya

Alima Dembélé or Gnere Dembele (born January 20, 2000) is a center basketball player who is playing for Mali women's national basketball team and IDK Euskotren in Spain- LF Endesa.

== Career history ==
Alima Dembélé was 11 years when she started playing basketball. She first joined La Salle Melilla in 2019 to play the Andalusian National first division where her team was placed second highest category in Spanish basketball. During 2019–2020 season she was transferred to Lanzarote to join the Magec Tias discipline to play women's league 2. Before she joined Innova-tsn Leganes, she played for island of Tenerife during 2020–2021 season.

Dembélé set her career high in points in Spain- LF Endesa (W) game on 27 December 2022 after scoring 23 points in IDK Eusk.'s road win against Innova-TSN Leganes, 61- 92. On that same day she tied her career high assist after dishing 4 assist. She again set her career high in rebounds on 18 March 2023 after getting 9 rebounds in IDK Euskotren home win against Innova- TSN Leganes, 81- 54. She played the 2019-2020 season at Magnectias Contra Violencia Genero where she played 1 game with 10 points per game, 4 rebounds per game, 1 steels per game before joining Ausarta Barakaldo on 19 December. She played 23 games at IDK Eustotren San Sebastian with 6.3 points per game, 3.3 rebounds per game, 0.7 assist per game and 0.6 steels per game.

== Mali National Team ==
She first represented Mali in 2016 when she was called to play FIBA U17 women's world cup. She was also part of the national youth team who played 2017 FIBA U19 women's basketball world cup, 2018 FIBA U18 women's African championship and 2019 FIBA U19 women's world cup. Dembélé was again called to the national senior team in 2021 to play 2021 women's AfroBasket. Dembele was also part of the Mali women's basketball squad that plays 2022 FIBA women's basketball world cup and 2023 women's AfroBasket.
