= Ritah Imanishimwe =

Ugandan female basketball player (born 1996)

JKL Lady Dolphins
- Position: Shooting guard

Personal information
- Listed height: 5 ft 8 in (1.73 m)

Career information
- College: Uganda Christian University

Ritah Imanishimwe (born 12 June 1996) is a Ugandan basketball player for the Uganda Women's National team and JKL Lady Dolphins.

== Early life ==
Ritah was born on 12 June 1996 to Jackson Rugwiza and Evans Nyirakubanza in Karusandara, Kasese. She attended Kiwuliriza primary school, Kisugu before proceeding Crane High School for both her O and A-levels of education.

She holds a bachelor's degree in Journalism and Mass Communication from the Uganda Christian University.

== Career ==
Her journey into basketball started in her secondary school days when Julius Lutwana identified her.

In 2014, she got recruited into UCU Lady Canons team after her performance was noticed during the 2013 National tournament held in Mbarara.

She is currently playing for the JKL Lady Dolphins.
