= Norhan Amed =

Egyptian basketball player

Norhan Amed (born 21 July 1997 in Cairo) is an Egyptian basketball player who plays as a forward for the Egyptian women's basketball team and also Sporting Club in Egypt. She is 5 feet 10 inches (179) tall.

== Career highlight ==
=== National Team Senior ===
Sources:

- In the 2023 FIBA Women's AfroBasket, she played three games, averaging 1.7 points, 0.7 rebounds, 0.7 assists, and an efficiency rating of 0.7.
- During the 2023 FIBA Women's AfroBasket qualifiers, she participated in five games, averaging 3.4 points, 2 rebounds, 0.4 assists, and an efficiency rating of 1.2.
- In the 2021 FIBA Women's AfroBasket, she played five games, averaging 5.6 points, 1.6 rebounds, 0.8 assists, and an efficiency rating of 5.2.
- At the 2021 FIBA Women's Afrobasket - Qualifiers - Zone 5, she participated in four games, averaging 6.3 points, 0.8 rebounds, 1.8 assists, and an efficiency rating of 6.
- Overall, her total averages for the national team senior level are 4.6 points, 1.4 rebounds, 1 assist, and an efficiency rating of 3.6.

=== National Team Youth ===
During the 2013 FIBA Africa U16 Championship for Women, she participated in six games, averaging 7.5 points, 1.2 rebounds, 0.5 assists, and an efficiency rating of 7.8. In the 2014 FIBA U17 World Championship for Women, she played seven games, averaging 5 points, 3.1 rebounds, 0.9 assists, and an efficiency rating of 0.3.

=== Leagues ===
In the 2023 FIBA Africa Women's Basketball League, playing for Sporting, she participated in seven games, averaging 5.6 points, 1.7 rebounds, 1 assist, and an efficiency rating of 5. During the 2022 FIBA Africa Champions Cup Women, also with Sporting, she played six games, averaging 8.3 points, 2.7 rebounds, 0.3 assists, and an efficiency rating of 5.2.
