= Fatou Diagne =

Senegalese basketball player

No. 45 – Purdue Boilermakers
- Position: Center
- League: B1G

Personal information
- Born: 20 January 1996 (age 30) Thiès, Senegal
- Listed height: 1.95 m (6 ft 5 in)

Career information
- College: Purdue (2017–present)
Medals
Women's basketball
Representing Senegal
AfroBasket
Silver medal – second place	2019 Senegal
Silver medal – second place	2023 Rwanda

Fatou Babou Diagne (born 20 January 1996) is a Senegalese basketball player for the Purdue Boilermakers and the Senegalese national team.

She represented Senegal at the 2019 Women's Afrobasket.
