= Maria Najjuma =

Ugandan basketball player (born 2003)

Personal information
- Born: 25 December 2003
- Listed height: 6 ft 4 in (1.93 m)
- Position: Center

Maria Najjuma (born 25 December 2003) is a Ugandan basketball player. She was named 2019 FIBA U16 Women's African Championship All-Star Five alongside Mariam Coulibaly, Maimouna Haidara, Sara Caetano and Malak Sadek.

== Early life ==
Najjuma was introduced to basketball when she was a teenager. Having determination to study, she was sponsored to go back to school at Nations Changers Christian school where she wrote her primary leaving examinations and passed. She proceeded to St. Noa girls secondary school on scholarship where she was called by Ugandan National team to play for the U16 category where she picked over 30 bounds and 30 points in a game. Later On, she got a scholarship in the US and has been playing for her country 's national team since then.

== Career ==
Najjuma was named All-star Five during the 2019 FIBA U16 Women's African Championship, and highest rebounder with 112 rebounds which earned her a place into the NBA Academy Africa to grow her skills.
