= Odile Tetero =

Rwandan basketball player

APR
- Position: Point guard

Personal information
- Born: 24 February 1998 (age 28)
- Listed height: 5 ft 4 in (1.63 m)

Odile Tetero (born 24 February 1998) is a Rwandan basketball player who plays for the Rwandan women's Basketball National Team. She was named the Most Valuable Player in the 2022/2023 Rwanda Basketball League (RBL) playoffs. She has earned recognition as one of the best point guards in Rwandan basketball.

== Early life ==
Odile was born in Karongi District, Western Province, Rwanda. Her educational journey began in Karongi where she graduated at Gatwaro Primary School before proceeding to College St Marie. Later in the year, she enrolled at Groupe Scolaire Officiel de Butare Scolaire(GSOB).

From 2016 to 2021, she studied Anesthesiology at University of Rwanda. After graduation, she practised her medical skills at Nyarugenge Hospital.

== Career ==
Odile started playing football in her early career before transitioning into basketball in 2010. Coach Jovithe Kabarere discovered her while she was playing basketball in a camp and encouraged her. This continued as she joined Groupe Scolaire Officiel de Butare, where coach Charles Mushumba recognised her talent during a competition. This led to her participation in the Federation of East Africa Secondary School Sports (FEASSA) games.

Odile started her professional basketball career with the IPRC-Huye team in 2015.

In 2019, she made her international debut during the Afrobasket qualifiers in Uganda . She joined the REG Women's basketball in 2021 where she contributed to the team's first league title win.

In 2022, she joined APR on a two-year contract, the team secured the championship in 2023 Rwanda Women's Basketball League and Odile earned the title of Most Valuable Player at the playoffs.
