= Uganda women's national basketball team =

Women's national basketball team representing Uganda

Uganda
- FIBA ranking: 57 ▼4 (18 March 2026)
- Joined FIBA: 1963
- FIBA zone: FIBA Africa
- National federation: Federation of Uganda Basketball Association
- Coach: Nicholas Natuhereza
- Nickname: Gazelles

AfroBasket
- Appearances: 4
| Home | Away |

The Uganda women's national basketball team, also known as the Gazelles, is the women's national basketball team of Uganda. It represents the country in international women's basketball competitions and is governed by the Federation of Uganda Basketball Associations (FUBA), the national governing body for basketball in Uganda. FUBA became affiliated with the International Basketball Federation (FIBA) in 1963 and is a member of FIBA Africa.

Uganda has emerged as one of the leading women's basketball nations in East Africa. The national team has qualified for the FIBA Women's AfroBasket four times, in 1997, 2015, 2023 and 2025. The team's best performance came in 2023 when it finished seventh, before placing eighth at the 2025 edition. Uganda also won the 2025 FIBA Africa Zone Five Women's AfroBasket Qualifiers to secure consecutive appearances at the continental championship.

== History ==
=== Formation and early years ===
Basketball was introduced in Uganda during the early 1960s, and the Federation of Uganda Basketball Associations (FUBA) was established in 1962 before joining FIBA in 1963. Since then, FUBA has overseen the development of basketball across the country, including the women's national programme, domestic leagues and youth competitions.

For several decades Uganda participated mainly in regional competitions within East Africa while working to strengthen women's basketball through schools, clubs and university programmes. The national team gradually became more competitive in the FIBA Africa Zone Five region.

=== First AfroBasket appearance ===
Uganda made its debut at the FIBA Women's AfroBasket in 1997, finishing ninth. The Uganda national basketball team did not immediately become a regular participant at the continental championship, this appearance marked an important milestone in the development of women's basketball in the country.

=== Breakthrough in 2023 ===
Uganda qualified for the 2023 FIBA Women's AfroBasket and finished seventh. The tournament established the Gazelles among the continent's emerging teams and demonstrated the rapid progress of women's basketball in Uganda.

== African Championship record ==
- 1997 – 9th
- 2015 – 10th
- 2023 – 7th
- 2025 – 8th

== 2025 FIBA Women's AfroBasket qualification ==
Uganda qualified for the 2025 FIBA Women's AfroBasket by winning the FIBA Africa Zone Five Qualifiers held in Cairo, Egypt. The Gazelles defeated host nation Egypt in the decisive match to secure their place at the continental championship, making it their second consecutive AfroBasket appearance. Team captain Jane Asinde was named the tournament's Most Valuable Player (MVP) and Best Power Forward after leading Uganda throughout the qualifiers.

== Current roster ==
Roster for the 2025 Women's Afrobasket.

Uganda women's national basketball team roster
Players
Coaches

| Pos. | No. | Name | Age – Date of birth | Height | Club | Ctr. |
|---|---|---|---|---|---|---|
| SG | 1 | Perus Nyamwenge | 25 – 5 February 2000 | 1.70 m (5 ft 7 in) | KCCA Leopards | (Uganda) |
| SG | 4 | Tracy Namugosa | 25 – 31 March 2000 | 1.70 m (5 ft 7 in) | KCCA Leopards | (Uganda) |
| SF | 5 | Agatha Kamwada | 24 – 24 November 2000 | 1.70 m (5 ft 7 in) | JKL Dolphins | (Uganda) |
| PG | 7 | Shakirah Nanvubya | 24 – 13 November 2000 | 1.72 m (5 ft 8 in) | JKL Dolphins | (Uganda) |
| SG | 9 | Jamila Nansikombi | 28 – 22 February 1997 | 1.84 m (6 ft 0 in) | JKL Dolphins | (Uganda) |
| PG | 11 | Evelyne Nakiyingi | 26 – 2 November 1998 | 1.68 m (5 ft 6 in) | JKL Dolphins | (Uganda) |
| C | 12 | Hope Akello | 26 – 29 September 1998 | 1.83 m (6 ft 0 in) | JKL Dolphins | (Uganda) |
| PF | 16 | Sharon Nangobi | 29 – 3 April 1996 | 1.88 m (6 ft 2 in) | KIU Rangers | (Uganda) |
| C | 18 | Melissa Akullu | 25 – 25 August 1999 | 1.85 m (6 ft 1 in) | Imortal D.C. | (Portugal) |
| C | 22 | Claire Lamunu | 31 – 24 December 1993 | 1.85 m (6 ft 1 in) | Kenya Ports Authority | (Kenya) |
| SF | 24 | Paige Robinson | 25 – 24 July 2000 | 1.88 m (6 ft 2 in) | Herner TC | (Germany) |
| SF | 35 | Jane Asinde | 25 – 15 October 1999 | 1.88 m (6 ft 2 in) | Porta XI Ensino | (Spain) |

Head coach

- (Uganda) Nicholas Natuhereza

Assistant coach(es)

- (Uganda) Julius Lutwana

Legend

- Club – describes last
  club before the tournament
- Age – describes age
  on 26 July 2025

== Honours ==
Regional competitions

- FIBA Africa Zone Five Women's Championship
  - Champions (1): 2025

== Individual honours ==
- Jane Asinde – FIBA Africa Zone Five Women's AfroBasket Qualifiers MVP (2025)
- Jane Asinde – Best Power Forward, FIBA Africa Zone Five Women's AfroBasket Qualifiers (2025)
- Jane Asinde – FIBA Women's AfroBasket All-Star Five (2025)

== See also ==
- Uganda women's national under-19 basketball team
- Uganda women's national 3x3 team
