= Fatou Pouye =

Senegalese basketball player

Joventut Badalona
- Position: Forward

Personal information
- Born: January 14, 1997 (age 28); Kaolack
- Listed height: 6 ft 1 (1.84m)

Fatou Pouye (born January 14, 1997) is a Senegalese basketball player who plays for the Club Joventut Badalona.

== Playing career ==
Fatou while in high school played for a season at Glasgow Christian Academy, Kentucky and at SEED Academy, Thiès.

As a freshman at South Georgia Technical College (2017-2018) she played with the team and became a member of NJCAA Region XVII Championship team. She appeared in 32 games as a sophomore in South Georgia Technical College (JUCO), she became a three-time Georgia Collegiate Athletic Association (GCAA) Division I women's basketball Player of the Week and, the first women's basketball player to be selected as the Player of the Week in Division I for 2019.

Prior to her transfer to the Duquesne University, Fatou played in every game with the Western Kentucky Lady Toppers as a guard. As a junior, she scored in double figures twice and was named for the Conference USA Commissioner's Honour Roll and she earned the Dean's List honors in the spring semester. And as a senior, Fatou had three double-doubles, scored 21 points during the match against Louisiana Tech and pulled down 13 rebounds against them, she was the leading scorer for the team in four games and collected a career-high 14 rebounds at Rice on February 12th and 23 points at FIU on February 26th.

Fatou joined Duquesne Dukes as a graduate transfer in 2021 and played 28 games, ranked second on the team and the 18th in the conference.

In September 2023, Fatou joined the Club Joventut Badalona, a Spanish basketball club. She also played with the Senegalese team for the FIBA Women's AfroBasketball and in 2024, for the FIBA Women's Olympic Qualifying Tournament Belgium.
