= Blessing Ejiofor =

Nigerian basketball player (born 1998)

Personal information
- Born: 2 September 1998 (age 28) Ebonyi, Nigeria
- Listed height: 196 cm (6 ft 5 in)

Career information
- High school: Eastside (Paterson, New Jersey)
- College: Vanderbilt (2017–2018); Chipola (2018–2019); West Virginia (2019–2021)
- Playing career: 2022–present
- Position: Center

Career history
- 2022: CD Talent
- 2022–2023: COB Calais
- 2023–2024: Cavigal Nice Basket

Blessing Ejiofor (born September 2, 1998) is a Nigerian professional basketball player and a member of the Nigeria national team. Originating from Ebonyi, Nigeria, she played college basketball for Vanderbilt University, Chipola and West Virginia University. Following her college career, she has played professionally in Spain and France.

== Early life ==
Ejiofor began playing basketball at the age of 13. At an early age, she chose Vanderbilt University as her dream school.

In 2014, Ejiofor, a sophomore in high school, traveled to the United States after being recruited by Evelyn Mack Academy in Charlotte, North Carolina, as a basketball player. However, she ended up attending Eastside High School in Paterson, New Jersey, where she attracted attention for her basketball playing and was offered a scholarship to Vanderbilt. Following her enrollment at Vanderbilt in 2016, Ejiofor realized that her student visa had been expired for a year, as Eastside had not filed the proper paperwork to renew it. Ejiofor returned to Nigeria for a year, and returned to Vanderbilt after her student visa was renewed for the 2017–2018 academic year.

== College career ==
As a freshman at Vanderbilt, Ejiofor scored 28 points for the Commodores, playing an average of 5.6 minutes across 22 games. After her first year, Ejiofor transferred to Chipola College in Florida, where she played for one season. She then transferred again to West Virginia University.

== Professional career ==
Ejiofor started her professional career with CD Talent in the Spanish Liga Femenina 2 de Baloncesto in 2022. For the 2022–2023 season, she signed with COB Calais. She stayed in France the following season, signing with Cavigal Nice Basket.
