= Masseny Kaba =

American-Guinean basketball player (born 1998)

Personal information
- Born: December 15, 1998 (age 27) Dorchester, Massachusetts
- Listed height: 6 ft 3 in (1.91 m)

Career information
- High school: Cathedral High School
- College: University of Central Florida
- WNBA draft: 2022: undrafted
- Position: Forward
- Number: 25
- Stats at Basketball Reference

Masseny Kaba (born December 15, 1998) is a Guinean basketball player. She plays professionally for the Guinea women's national basketball team.

== High School ==
Kaba scored 41 points in a single game as a sophomore and also was a two-time state champion at Cathedral High School.

== College ==
In her freshman year in the University of Central Florida she appeared in all 33 games, making 28 starts and averaged 8.2 points per game and was second on the team in rebounding with 6.0 boards per contest. In her sophomore year Kaba appeared in all 33 games, starting nine while averaging 6.5 points and 4.5 rebounds per game.

Kaba appeared in 29 games, starting all of them, led the Knights with 6.7 rebounds per game and was fourth on the team with 8.4 points per contest in her junior year. Also in her senior year she averaged 12.0 points and 7.3 rebounds per game and led UCF to The American championship game.

== National Team Career ==
Kaba participated in the 2021 FIBA Women's AfroBasket with her national team and averaged 8.7 points per game, 5.7 rebounds per game and 1 assists.
