= Ifunanya Okoro =

Nigerian Women's Basketball Player

Alexandria
- Position: Point Guard
- League: Premier League

Personal information
- Born: July 6, 1999 (age 27) Arochukwu, Abia State
- Listed height: 6 ft 0 in (1.83 m)
- Listed weight: 150 lb (68 kg)

Career history
- 2016–2018: First Deepwater Basketball Club
- 2018–2019: First Bank BC
- 2019: MFM Queens
- 2022–2022: First Bank BC
- 2022–2023: Kenya Ports Authority
- 2023–2024: Tindastóll
- 2024: Iraklis Thessaloniki
- 2024–: Alexandria

Career highlights
- KBF League 2023 - MVP

Ifunanya Okoro (born 6 July 1999) is a Nigerian basketball player who plays for the Alexandria S.C. and the Nigeria women's national basketball team.

== Professional career ==
Okoro started her career with First Deepwater Basketball Club in 2016. In 2018, she joined First Bank BC and participated in the 2018 FIBA Africa Women's Champions Cup where she averaged 1.4 points, 1.8 rebounds, 1.2 assists. She played the Final 8 Tournament of the Zenith Women Basketball League for First Bank BC and she was named in the 2019 Zenith Women Basketball League season Top 5 players of the Season. In 2019 December signed at MFM Queens and participated in the 2019 FIBA Africa Women's Champions Cup where she averaged 13.8 points, 5 rebounds, 4.5 assists.

In 2022, she played for First Bank BC and later joined the Kenya Ports Authority of Kenya-Premier League, she participated in the 2022 FIBA Africa Women's Champions Cup where she averaged 20.9 points, 4.6 rebounds and 1.9 assists per game. She also made the 5 player All-Star team Selection of the 8 day Tournament. She was named the Most Valuable Player of the 2023 Kenyan Basketball Federation (KBF) Premier League in her first Season of the League.

She joined the Tindastóll women's basketball department of the Ungmennafélagið Tindastóll sport club and is based in Sauðárkrókur, Iceland.

== National team career ==
Okoro played 3x3 basketball for the Nigeria 3x3 basketball national team and she won Gold in the 2019 African Games. She also played for the Nigeria women's national basketball team in the 2023 Women's Afrobasket tournament where she averaged 10 points, 2.2 rebounds and 3.8 assists. She also participated in the 2024 FIBA Women's Olympic Qualifying Tournaments where she averaged 2 points, 2 rebounds and 2 assists.
