= Cristina Matiquite =

Angolan basketball player

No. 20 – Primeiro de Agosto
- Position: Center
- League: Angolan League; Africa Club Champions Cup

Personal information
- Born: 12 March 1992 (age 34) Luanda, Angola
- Listed height: 191 cm (6 ft 3 in)

Career history
- 2014: Interclube
- 2015: Maculusso
- 2016: 1º de Agosto

Cristina Matiquite (born 12 March 1992) is an Angolan basketball player. She competed for Angola at the 2011 FIBA Africa Championship. She plays as a center.
