= Fatoumata Jallow =

Swedish-Guinean basketball player

Fatou Jallow
No. 12 – Byrant Bulldogs
- Position: Guard

Personal information
- Born: April 16, 1997 (age 29) Stockholm, Sweden
- Listed height: 5 ft 7 in (1.70 m)

Career information
- High school: Solna Gymnasium
- College: Bryant University

Fatou Jallow (born April 16, 1997) is a Guinean basketball player. She plays for Byrant University Bulldogs and also the Guinea women's national basketball team.

== College ==
Jallow began her collegiate career at Cowley College before transferring to Salt Lake City Community College for her sophomore season and helped her team become Region Champions. She averaged 6.9 points,2.6 rebounds and 1.4 assists per game.

She later moved to Bryant University. As a junior in Bryant University, she appeared in 21 games making starts in 21, averaged 6 .9 points, 2.1 rebounds and 1.4 assists per game.

== National Team Career ==
Jallow participated in the FIBA Women's AfroBasket 2021 with her national team and averaged 7 points per game, 2.3 rebounds per game, and 1 assists.
