= Marguerite Effa =

Cameroonian basketball player

No. 13 – Azkoitia Azepeitia ISB
- Position: Forward

Personal information
- Born: January 19, 1997 (age 29) Cameroon
- Listed height: 6 ft 3 in (1.91 m)

Career information
- High school: Fairfax High School (CA)
- College: Southern California (2015–2018); Nevada, Reno (2019–2020)
Medals
Women's basketball
Representing Cameroon
AfroBasket
Bronze medal – third place	2021 Cameroon

Marguerite Manuela Effa Mfegue (born Jan 19, 1997) is a Cameroonian basketball player. She plays for Azkoitia Azepeitia ISB women team in Spain. She is the daughter of Parfait Effa who competed in the Olympics in Judo in 2000.

== High school ==
She attended FairFax High School. She averaged 23.4 points, and 12.2 rebounds during her four years at Fairfax. She was a two-time pick as the Los Angeles City Section Player of the Year out of Fairfax High School and also helped her team to a conference championship in 2015.

== College ==
A graduate transfer student from USC to Nevada. In USC she played three seasons for the Trojans. Her best season was her freshman year in 2015-2016 where she averaged 2.4 points per game and 2.5 rebounds per game. After moving to Nevada she played in all 31 games during her lone season with the Wolf Pack and made 14 starts. Scored in double figures in 15 of the team's 31 games and was named a "MW Scholar-Athlete."

== National Team Career ==
Effa participated in the 2021 Women's Afrobasket where she won the bronze medal with her team. She averaged 13.2 points, 6 rebounds and 1.8 assists.
