= Amy Okonkwo =

Nigerian basketball player (born 1996)

No. 8 – Portland Fire
- Position: Forward

Personal information
- Born: 26 August 1996 (age 30) Fontana, California, U.S.
- Listed height: 1.88 m (6 ft 2 in)
- Listed weight: 66 kg (146 lb)

Career information
- High school: Etiwanda (Etiwanda, California)
- College: USC (2014–2015); TCU (2016–2019)
- WNBA draft: 2020: undrafted
- Playing career: 2020–present

Career history
- 2019–2021: CD Zamarat
- 2021–2022: Innova-TSN Leganés
- 2022: Saint-Amand-les-Eaux
- 2022–2023: Maccabi Haifa
- 2023: Halcones
- 2023–2024: Landerneau
- 2024–2025: Bourges
- 2025: Dallas Wings
- 2025–present: Beşiktaş
- 2026: Atlanta Dream
- 2026-present: Portland Fire

Career highlights
- FIBA AfroBasket MVP (2023, 2025); Big 12 Sixth Player of the Year (2018)
- Stats at Basketball Reference
Medals
Women's basketball
Representing Nigeria
AfroBasket
Gold medal – first place	2023 Rwanda
Gold medal – first place	2025 Ivory Coast

Amy Nnenna Okonkwo (born 26 August 1996) is an American-Nigerian professional basketball player for the Portland Fire of the WNBA and Beşiktaş of the Turkish Super League. Born in the United States, she represents Nigeria at international level.

== Professional career ==
Amy spent three seasons in Spain before joining the French women's basketball league in 2022 with the team in Saint-Amand. During her first season in France, she averaged 12 points and 6 rebounds per game. After playing in Israel and then Mexico, Amy Okonkwo joined Landerneau Bretagne Basket in 2023. She finished as her team's top scorer, averaging 17 points and 7 rebounds per game, and helped keep the Breton club in the league.

=== WNBA ===
On August 21, 2025, the Dallas Wings signed Okonkwo to a seven-day hardship contract.

In April 2026, Okonkwo signed a Training Camp contract with the Dallas Wings and began training with the team on April 19. On May 4, she was waived prior to the start of the 2026 season.

On May 13, 2026, Okonkwo signed with the Atlanta Dream on a player development contract. She was released on July 8 to make room for Indya Nivar.

On August 10, 2026, Okonkwo signed a rest-of-season hardship contract with the Portland Fire.

== Nigerian National team career ==
Amy represented Nigeria at the 2020 Summer Olympics in Tokyo, where she averaged 2.7 points and 1 rebound. She also participated in the 2021 Afrobasket, where she won gold with the team and averaged 9.4 points, 4.2 rebounds and 0.4 assists. She also represented Nigeria in the 2023 FIBA Women’s AfroBasket, hosted in Kigali Rwanda where she was named the most valuable player. Okonkwo also headlined the All-Star Tournament team of 2023 alongside Cierra Dillard (Senegal), Jannon Otto (Uganda]), Sika Kone (Mali) and Tamara Seda (Mozambique). She became the only Nigerian to register two double-doubles.

== Career statistics ==
Legend
GP	Games played	GS	Games started	MPG	Minutes per game	RPG	Rebounds per game
APG	Assists per game	SPG	Steals per game	BPG	Blocks per game	PPG	Points per game
TO	Turnovers per game	FG%	Field-goal percentage	3P%	3-point field-goal percentage	FT%	Free-throw percentage
**Bold**	Career best	°	League leader

=== WNBA ===
==== Regular season ====
Stats current through end of 2025 season

WNBA regular season statistics
Year	Team	GP	GS	MPG	FG%	3P%	FT%	RPG	APG	SPG	BPG	TO	PPG
2025	Dallas	8	1	19.6	.492	.333	.900	3.1	0.8	1.4	0.1	0.9	11.0
**Career**	1 year, 1 team	8	1	19.6	.492	.333	.900	3.1	0.8	1.4	0.1	0.9	11.0

=== College ===
Year	Team	GP	GS	MPG	FG%	3P%	FT%	RPG	APG	SPG	BPG	TO	PPG
2014–15	USC	27	1	7.1	**51.5**	0.0	60.6	2.1	0.2	0.3	0.1	**0.3**	3.3
2015–16	Sat out due to NCAA Transfer Rules												
2016–17	TCU	30	14	18.3	49.8	34.5	78.4	5.5	**1.0**	**1.1**	0.3	1.9	10.2
2017–18	TCU	**36**	0	19.8	50.1	**38.9**	**88.1**	5.8	0.9	0.8	**0.4**	1.8	**14.4**
2018–19	TCU	35	**24**	**24.8**	44.9	36.7	86.9	**6.7**	0.7	**1.1**	**0.4**	2.1	14.3
**Career**		128	39	18.1	48.2	36.2	82.6	5.2	0.8	0.8	0.3	1.6	11.0
Statistics retrieved from Sports-Reference.
