= Hope Akello =

Ugandan basketball player

No. 12 – JKL Dolphins 2017-2024
- Position: Power Forward

Personal information
- Born: 8 December 1997 (age 28) Kampada District, Uganda
- Listed height: 6 ft 0 in (1.83 m)

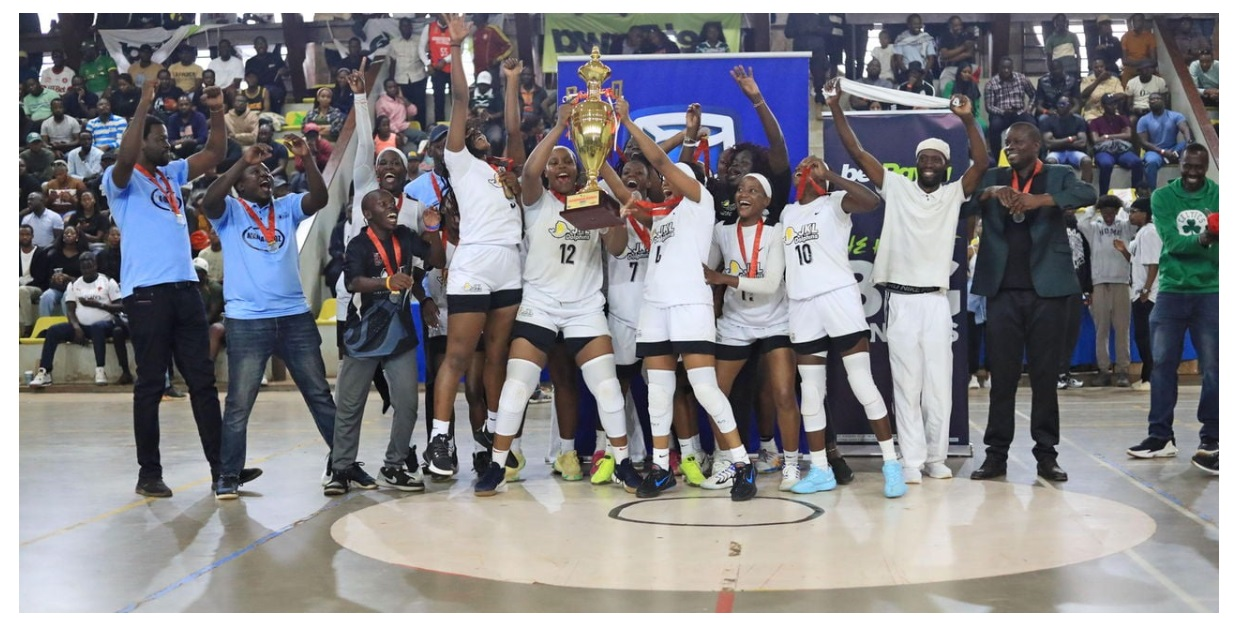

Hope Akello is a Ugandan basketball player. She is a member of the Uganda women's national basketball team, including at the 2023 Women's Afrobasket.

On club level she plays with Lady Dolphins. She won the 2019 Most Valuable Basketball Player Award. Hope Akello helped JKL Lady Dolphins win Uganda National Basket League (NBL) 2025. She has been arguably the best player in the league in 2025.
