= Janai Crooms =

American basketball player (born 1999)

APR
- Position: Guard

Personal information
- Born: 23 June 1999 (age 27) Cranston, Rhode Island, U.S.
- Listed height: 5 ft 10 in (1.78 m)

Career information
- High school: St. Andrews (Barrington, Rhode Island)
- College: Providence College

Janai Crooms Robertson (born 23 June 1999) is a Rwandan-American basketball player.

== Early life ==
Crooms was born on 23 June 1999 in Cranston, Rhode Island, to John Crooms and Lisa Robertson. She attended St. Andrew's School in Barrington, Rhode Island, where she played on the basketball team. Crooms was rated a four-star recruit and was ranked No. 36 in the 2018 class by Prospect Nation.

== College career ==
Crooms played for Ohio State Buckeyes for two seasons (2018 to 2020), Michigan State Spartans from 2020 to 2021 before joining Providence Friars for two seasons (2021 to 2023). As a sophomore at Ohio State in 2019–20, she played in 32 games, made 10 starts, averaged 6.8 points per game.

In 2022, while she was with the Providence Friars, she earned the All-Big East Conference honors alongside Kylee Sheppard.

== National team career ==
Crooms played for Rwanda in the 2023 FIBA Women's AfroBasket where she averaged 13.6 points, 5.6 rebounds and 2.8 assists per game during the tournament.
