= Hope Butera =

Rwandan basketball player

No. 11 – Idaho Vandals women's basketball
- Position: Forward

Personal information
- Born: 10 February 2001 (age 25)
- Listed height: 6 ft 3 in (1.91 m)

Career information
- High school: Lycée de Kigali
- College: Florida International University

Hope Butera (born 10 February 2001) is a Rwandan basketball player who plays for the Idaho Vandals and Rwanda Women's National Team.

== Early life ==
Raised in an orphanage, Butera was introduced to sports at a young age.

== College career ==
Butera played at The Hoops from 2018 to 2019, then at South Georgia Technical College between 2019 and 2021, moved to play for Florida International Panthers for two seasons (2021–2023), joined the Idaho Vandals after leaving the Florida International Panthers in 2023.

As a freshman at FIU, Butera averaged 3.8 rebounds, 6.1 rebounds per game in her sophomore season. In her two seasons at FIU, she appeared in 62 games, scored 182 points and averaged a total of 278 rebounds.

Before FIU, Butera spent two seasons at South Georgia Technical College (SGTC) at the JUCO level. At SGTC, she appeared in 57 games making six starts. As a power forward, she tallied 277 rebounds, 21 assists, 25 blocks, and 259 points during her time at SGTC.

== National Team career ==
Her dedication to basketball led her to represent Rwanda at the U18 Women's basketball team, FIBA U-18 Women's African Championships in 2016, where she averaged 6 points, 6.6 rebounds and played a crucial role in her team's fourth place.
