= Melissa Akullu =

Ugandan basketball player

No. 15 – Immortal TCarz
- Position: Forward

Personal information
- Born: 25 August 1999 (age 27)
- Listed height: 6 ft 1 in (1.85 m)

Career information
- College: Makerere University; Vanguard University

Career highlights
- GSAC Player of the Year (2024); GSAC Defensive Player of the Year (2024); NAIA All-American (2024); WBCA Coaches' All-American (2024)
Medals
Women's 3x3 basketball
Representing Uganda
Commonwealth Games
Silver medal – second place	2026 Glasgow	Team

Melissa Akullu (born 25 August 1999) is a Ugandan basketball player. She concluded the 2023 basketball season as one of the nations' most decorated players.

== Early life ==
Melissa was born in Kampala, Uganda.

== Career ==
In February 2024, Melissa was named the Player of the Week by Golden State Athletic Conference (GSAC) where she averaged 23.5 points and 19.0 rebounds for Vanguard win.
