= Destiney Philoxy =

Rwandan-American basketball player

No. 1 – REG
- Position: Guard

Personal information
- Born: October 25, 2000 (age 26) Queens, New York, U.S.
- Listed height: 5 ft 7 in (1.70 m)

Career information
- College: University of Massachusetts

Destiney Promise Philoxy (born 25 October 2000) is a Rwandan-American basketball player.

== Career ==
Destiney averaged 17.4 points, 2.4 rebounds and 3.4 assists per game in the 2023 Women's Afrobasket. In 2023, she joined the REG Women basketball club ahead of the 2023 FIBA Africa Women's Basketball League (AWBL).

== Personal life ==
Phyloxy was born in Queens to a Rwandan mother an American father.
