= 2026 Women's Basketball League Africa =

Basketball competition in the Africa region

Women's Basketball League Africa
- Season: 2026
- Dates: 11–20 December 2026
- Games played: TBD
- Teams: Total: 12 (from TBD countries)

The 2026 Women's Basketball League Africa was the 30th season of this Women's Basketball League Africa, the premier women's club competition for women's club teams in Africa. The tournament will take place on 11 to 20 December 2026.

The tournament will take place in Egypt, with Alexandria as the host city. This is Egypt's fourth time hosting after 2019, 2023 and 2025 and first in Alexandria.

Al Ahly are the defending champions after beating Ferroviário de Maputo 77–51 in the final in Cairo.

== Hosting rights ==
On 28 April 2026, Egypt was given the hosting rights, with Alexandria as the host city. This is Egypt's fourth time hosting after 2019, 2023 and 2025 and first in Alexandria.

== See also ==
- 2026 BAL season
