= 2024 Women's Basketball League Africa =

Basketball competition in the Africa region

Women's Basketball League Africa
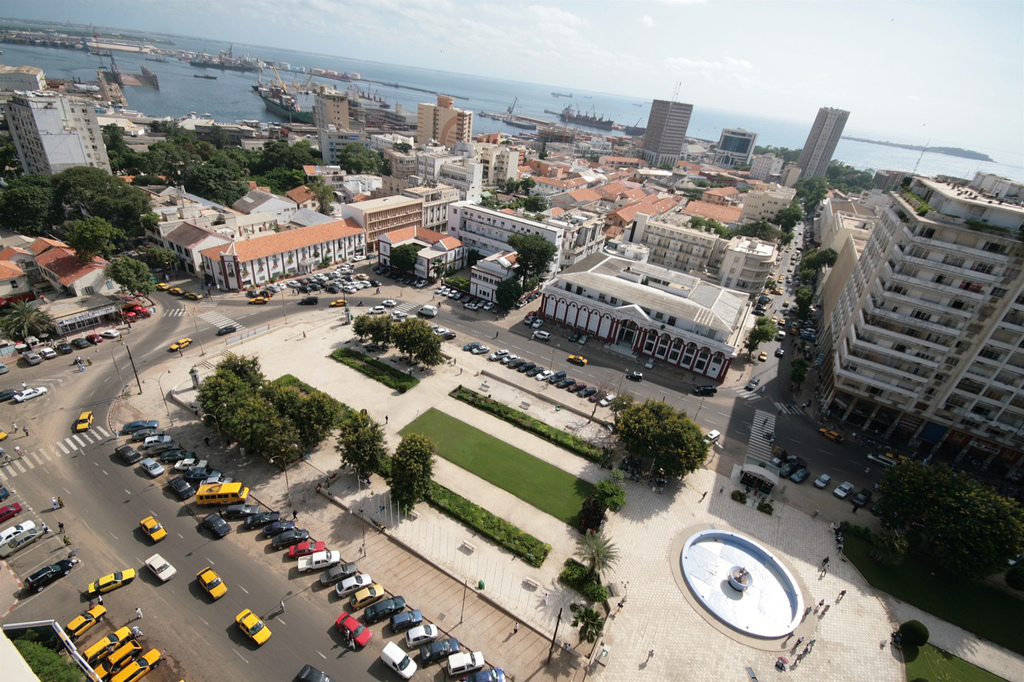
- The tournament was held in Dakar, Senegal.
- Season: 2024
- Dates: 6–15 December 2024
- Games played: 34
- Teams: Total: 12 (from 8 countries)

Regular season
- Season MVP: (Senegal) Ndioma Kané

Finals
- Champions: (Mozambique) Ferroviário de Maputo (3rd title)
- Runners-up: (Egypt) Al Ahly
- Third place: (Rwanda) APR
- Fourth place: (Senegal) ASC Ville de Dakar

Statistical leaders
- Points: (Canada) Shaina Pellington (18.2 points per game)
- Rebounds: (Senegal) Aminata Ly (14.0 rebounds per game)
- Assists: (Mali) Foune Sissoko (5.7 assists per game) (Rwanda) Destiney Philoxy

The 2024 Women's Basketball League Africa was the 28th season of this competition for women's teams in Africa. The tournament began on 6 December and ended on 15 December 2024, and was held in Dakar, Senegal.

Sporting Alexandria were the defending champions, but were eliminated in the group stage this time round.

Mozambican side Ferroviário de Maputo won their third title after defeating Al Ahly of Egypt 81–72 in the final.

== Name change ==
On 25 March 2024, the name was tweaked and is now called the Women's Basketball League Africa.

== Hosting rights ==
- Morocco (withdrew)
- Senegal

Originally, Morocco was given the hosting rights, however, on 22 October 2024, Senegal received the hosting rights instead. This is Senegal's fifth time hosting and first since 1999.

== Qualification ==
Twelve teams qualified for the main tournament, up from 10 from the previous editions. The top 2 from each zone qualified while the remaining spots would be given out by FIBA Africa. Those spots were given to FAP, Nigeria Customs and APR. Although, before the tournament started, Nigeria Customs withdrew. Their spot was given to Jeanne D'Arc.

Event	Date	Location	Vacancies	Qualified
Host Nation	22 October 2024		1	(Senegal) ASC Ville de Dakar
Defending champions			1	(Egypt) Alexandria Sporting Club
Qualification Zone 3	29 October – 3 November 2024	(Liberia) Monrovia	1	(Ivory Coast) Friend’s Basketball Association (Nigeria) Mountain of Fire and Miracles
Qualification Zone 4	27 October – 1 November 2024	(Cameroon) Douala	2	(Democratic Republic of the Congo) ASB Makomeno (Democratic Republic of the Congo) CNSS
Qualification Zone 5	27 October – 2 November 2024	Zanzibar	2	(Egypt) Al Ahly (Rwanda) REG
Qualification Zone 6	not held	(Mozambique) Maputo (originally)	1	(Mozambique) Ferroviário de Maputo
Wildcards			3	(Cameroon) FAP; ~~Nigeria Customs~~ (Rwanda) APR
Replacements			1	(Senegal) Jeanne D'Arc
Total			12	

== Venue ==
The venue is the Marius Ndiaye Stadium in Dakar.

2024 Women's Basketball League Africa is located in Senegal	Dakar
2024 Women's Basketball League Africa is located in Senegal	Marius Ndiaye Stadium
2024 Women's Basketball League Africa is located in Senegal	Capacity: 4,800

== Group stage ==
=== Group A ===
Pos	Team	Pld	W	L	PF	PA	PD	Pts	Qualification
1	(Egypt) Al Ahly	3	3	0	249	158	+91	6	Quarterfinals
2	(Senegal) ASC Ville de Dakar	3	2	1	184	165	+19	5	Quarterfinals
3	(Cameroon) FAP	3	1	2	179	206	−27	4	
4	(Nigeria) Mountain of Fire and Miracles	3	0	3	159	242	−83	3	

Source: FIBA
Rules for classification: 1) Points; 2) Points difference; 3) Points scored.

6 December 2024
18:00

Boxscore

ASC Ville de Dakar (Senegal)	57–54	(Cameroon) FAP
Scoring by quarter: 6–11, 15–16, 17–11, 19–16
Pts: Dabou, Sissoko 13; Rebs: Dabou 9 Asts: Mbaye, Ndao 4		Pts: McKenzie 12; Rebs: McKenzie 14; Asts: Tientcheu 3

Marius Ndiaye Stadium, Dakar
Referees: Dorothy Judy Okatch (BOT), Nadege Zouzou (CIV), Monicca Nassuuna (UGA)

7 December 2024
21:00

Boxscore

Mountain of Fire and Miracles (Nigeria)	49–99	(Egypt) Al Ahly
Scoring by quarter: 16–27, 7–29, 10–21, 16–22
Pts: Gbihi 18; Rebs: Odiowei 9 Asts: three players 2		Pts: Mohamed 22; Rebs: four players 6 Asts: Fair, Kane 6

Marius Ndiaye Stadium, Dakar
Attendance: 100

8 December 2024
21:00

Boxscore

Al Ahly (Egypt)	89–63	(Cameroon) FAP
Scoring by quarter: 24–13, 20–14, 27–16, 18–20
Pts: El-Gedawy, Richardson 13; Rebs: Richardson 8 Asts: Fair 6		Pts: Campbell 27; Rebs: McKenzie 8 Asts: Campbell 4

Marius Ndiaye Stadium, Dakar
Attendance: 500
Referees: Asmae Benkhadra (MAR), Fanta Toure (MLI), Nadege Zouzou (CIV)

8 December 2024
18:00

Boxscore

Mountain of Fire and Miracles (Nigeria)	50–81	(Senegal) ASC Ville de Dakar
Scoring by quarter: 10–21, 12–19, 15–18, 13–21
Pts: Beggi 15; Rebs: Hembam 9 Asts: Hembam 10		Pts: Dabou 19; Rebs: Dabou 14; Asts: Sissoko 8

Marius Ndiaye Stadium, Dakar
Attendance: 1,000
Referees: Joyce Muchenu (ZIM), Samuel Ikirezi Ngaju (RWA), Clarisse Ndeba Eleka (COD)

10 December 2024
12:00

Boxscore

FAP (Cameroon)	62–60	(Nigeria) Mountain of Fire and Miracles
Scoring by quarter: 22–12, 17–16, 12–12, 11–20
Pts: McKenzie 16; Rebs: Adeyeye, Ebogo 14; Asts: Kipo 4		Pts: Beggi 16; Rebs: Charles, Isaac 11; Asts: Hembam 6

Marius Ndiaye Stadium, Dakar
Attendance: 75
Referees: Maria Bagnath (MOZ), Samuel Ikirezi Ngaju (RWA), Asmae Benkhadra (MAR)

10 December 2024
18:00

Boxscore

ASC Ville de Dakar (Senegal)	46–61	(Egypt) Al Ahly
Scoring by quarter: 12–9, 16–21, 9–15, 9–16
Pts: Maiga 17; Rebs: Mbodj 10; Asts: Sissoko 5		Pts: Kané 19; Rebs: Kané, Sene 19; Asts: Abdelgawad, Richardson 2

Marius Ndiaye Stadium, Dakar
Attendance: 1,500
Referees: Monicca Nassuuna (UGA), Nadege Zouzou (CIV), Yao Adjoumani Kizungu (COD)

=== Group B ===
Pos	Team	Pld	W	L	PF	PA	PD	Pts	Qualification
1	(Ivory Coast) Friend’s Basketball Association	3	2	1	177	163	+14	5 (Note: Friend’s Basketball Association 63–55 APR)	Quarterfinals
2	(Rwanda) APR	3	2	1	202	203	−1	5	Quarterfinals
3	(Democratic Republic of the Congo) CNSS	3	1	2	172	197	−25	4 (Note: CNSS 61–59 Alexandria Sporting Club)	Quarterfinals
4	(Egypt) Alexandria Sporting Club	3	1	2	196	184	+12	4	

Source: FIBA
Rules for classification: 1) Points; 2) Points difference; 3) Points scored.
Notes:

6 December 2024
21:00

Boxscore

Friend’s Basketball Association (Ivory Coast)	49–65	(Egypt) Alexandria Sporting Club
Scoring by quarter: 14–20, 17–14, 11–16, 7–15
Pts: Berthé 14; Rebs: Tounkara 9 Asts: Traoré 5		Pts: Elshaarawy 19; Rebs: Elshaarawy 11; Asts: Bakr 6

Marius Ndiaye Stadium, Dakar
Attendance: 100
Referees: Nadege Zouzou (CIV), Fanta Toure (MLI), Asmae Benkhadra (MAR)

7 December 2024
15:00

Boxscore

CNSS (Democratic Republic of the Congo)	68–73	(Rwanda) APR
Scoring by quarter: 9–15, 21–13, 15–26, 23–19
Pts: Nguz 16; Rebs: Tshoto 13; Asts: Londa 4		Pts: Pellington 16; Rebs: Uwizeye 10; Asts: Lucas 6

Marius Ndiaye Stadium, Dakar
Attendance: 100

8 December 2024
15:00

Boxscore

Alexandria Sporting Club (Egypt)	59–61	(Democratic Republic of the Congo) CNSS
Scoring by quarter: 16–16, 20–9, 13–18, 10–18
Pts: Tillman 18; Rebs: Elshaarawy 16; Asts: Spolyar 5		Pts: Dramé 21; Rebs: Dramé, Kabongo 8 Asts: Nguz 6

Marius Ndiaye Stadium, Dakar
Attendance: 200
Referees: Imene Tahmi (ALG), Henri Léopold Biagui (SEN), Joyce Akosu (NGR)

8 December 2024
12:00

Boxscore

APR (Rwanda)	55–63	(Ivory Coast) Friend’s Basketball Association
Scoring by quarter: 18–13, 4–18, 13–20, 20–12
Pts: Pellington 18; Rebs: Lucas 8 Asts: Pellington 4		Pts: Berthé 14; Rebs: Ouraga 10; Asts: Berthé, Traoré 5

Marius Ndiaye Stadium, Dakar
Attendance: 150
Referees: Monicca Nassuuna (UGA), Christelle Madjio Libawo (CMR), Maria Bagnath (MOZ)

10 December 2024
15:00

Boxscore

Friend’s Basketball Association (Ivory Coast)	65–43	(Democratic Republic of the Congo) CNSS
Scoring by quarter: 16–10, 14–11, 21–12, 14–10
Pts: Tounkara 12; Rebs: Tolo 9 Asts: Tounkara 7		Pts: Dramé 15; Rebs: Mboup 6 Asts: Mbelu 5

Marius Ndiaye Stadium, Dakar
Attendance: 120
Referees: Dorothy Judy Okatch (BOT), Imene Tahmi (ALG), Christelle Madjio Libawo (CMR)

10 December 2024
21:00

Boxscore

Alexandria Sporting Club (Egypt)	72–74	(Rwanda) APR
Scoring by quarter: 14–19, 19–14, 22–20, 17–21
Pts: Elshaarawy 19; Rebs: Elshaarawy 15; Asts: Tillman 5		Pts: Bell 27; Rebs: Pellington 9 Asts: Pellington 7

Marius Ndiaye Stadium, Dakar
Attendance: 300
Referees: Fanta Toure (MLI), Joyce Muchenu (ZIM), Joyce Akosu (NGR)

=== Group C ===
Pos	Team	Pld	W	L	PF	PA	PD	Pts	Qualification
1	(Mozambique) Ferroviário de Maputo	3	3	0	230	142	+88	6	Quarterfinals
2	(Rwanda) REG	3	2	1	222	181	+41	5	Quarterfinals
3	(Senegal) Jeanne D'Arc	3	1	2	139	163	−24	4	Quarterfinals
4	(Democratic Republic of the Congo) ASB Makomeno	3	0	3	123	228	−105	3	

Source: FIBA
Rules for classification: 1) Points; 2) Points difference; 3) Points scored.

7 December 2024
12:00

Boxscore

ASB Makomeno (Democratic Republic of the Congo)	34–57	(Senegal) Jeanne D'Arc
Scoring by quarter: 14–19, 10–12, 7–9, 3–17
Pts: Traoré 12; Rebs: Kabongo, Traoré 11; Asts: Kokolo 5		Pts: Diop 18; Rebs: Konteye 9 Asts: Niang 4

Marius Ndiaye Stadium, Dakar
Attendance: 130

7 December 2024
18:00

Boxscore

Ferroviário de Maputo (Mozambique)	78–74	(Rwanda) REG
Scoring by quarter: 18–13, 20–18, 16–17, 24–26
Pts: Chiziane 12; Rebs: Covane 11; Asts: Chiziane, Veloso 6		Pts: Nezerwa 18; Rebs: Ly 17; Asts: Philoxy, Reynolds 4

Marius Ndiaye Stadium, Dakar
Attendance: 200

9 December 2024
15:00

Boxscore

REG (Rwanda)	83–51	(Democratic Republic of the Congo) ASB Makomeno
Scoring by quarter: 12–13, 25–8, 18–10, 28–20
Pts: Micomyiza 17; Rebs: Nezerwa 14; Asts: Philoxy 9		Pts: Traoré 15; Rebs: Traoré 11; Asts: Kokolo, Majonga 4

Marius Ndiaye Stadium, Dakar
Attendance: 80

9 December 2024
18:00

Boxscore

Jeanne D'Arc (Senegal)	30–64	(Mozambique) Ferroviário de Maputo
Scoring by quarter: 3–20, 15–16, 8–10, 4–18
Pts: Niang 7 Rebs: Konteye 10; Asts: Fall 4		Pts: Pitts 12; Rebs: Mulhui 10; Asts: Veloso 5

Marius Ndiaye Stadium, Dakar
Attendance: 200

11 December 2024
15:00

Boxscore

Ferroviário de Maputo (Mozambique)	88–38	(Democratic Republic of the Congo) ASB Makomeno
Scoring by quarter: 16–13, 22–14, 22–8, 28–3
Pts: Cossa 19; Rebs: Covane 8 Asts: Veloso 8		Pts: Traoré 10; Rebs: Kokolo 10; Asts: Traoré 4

Marius Ndiaye Stadium, Dakar
Attendance: 50

11 December 2024
18:00

Boxscore

REG (Rwanda)	65–52	(Senegal) Jeanne D'Arc
Scoring by quarter: 26–11, 11–15, 17–16, 11–10
Pts: Philoxy 20; Rebs: Ly 13; Asts: Philoxy 4		Pts: Diop 12; Rebs: Sy 9 Asts: Fall 5

Marius Ndiaye Stadium, Dakar
Attendance: 120

=== Ranking of third place teams ===
Pos	Grp	Team	Pld	W	L	PF	PA	PD	Pts	Qualification
1	C	(Senegal) Jeanne D'Arc	3	1	2	139	163	−24	4	Quarterfinals
2	B	(Democratic Republic of the Congo) CNSS	3	1	2	172	197	−25	4	Quarterfinals
3	A	(Cameroon) FAP	3	1	2	179	206	−27	4	

Source: FIBA
Rules for classification: 1) Points; 2) Points difference; 3) Points scored.

== Knockout stage ==
=== Seeding ===
The quarterfinal matchups were based on the results of the group stage.

Pos	Team	Pld	W	L	PF	PA	PD	Pts	Qualification
1	(Egypt) Al Ahly	3	3	0	249	158	+91	6	Quarterfinals
2	(Mozambique) Ferroviário de Maputo	3	3	0	230	142	+88	6	Quarterfinals
3	(Ivory Coast) Friend’s Basketball Association	3	2	1	177	163	+14	5	Quarterfinals
4	(Rwanda) REG	3	2	1	222	181	+41	5	Quarterfinals
5	(Senegal) ASC Ville de Dakar	3	2	1	184	165	+19	5	Quarterfinals
6	(Rwanda) APR	3	2	1	202	203	−1	5	Quarterfinals
7	(Senegal) Jeanne D'Arc	3	1	2	139	163	−24	4	Quarterfinals
8	(Democratic Republic of the Congo) CNSS	3	1	2	172	197	−25	4	Quarterfinals
9	(Cameroon) FAP	3	1	2	179	206	−27	4	Placement round
10	(Egypt) Alexandria Sporting Club	3	1	2	196	184	+12	4	Placement round
11	(Nigeria) Mountain of Fire and Miracles	3	0	3	159	242	−83	3	Placement round
12	(Democratic Republic of the Congo) ASB Makomeno	3	0	3	123	228	−105	3	Placement round

Source: FIBA
Rules for classification: 1) Points; 2) Points difference; 3) Points scored.

=== Bracket ===
Quarterfinals
(Egypt) Al Ahly	89
(Democratic Republic of the Congo) CNSS	36
(Rwanda) REG	57
(Senegal) ASC Ville de Dakar (OT)	61
(Mozambique) Ferroviário de Maputo	65
(Senegal) Jeanne D'Arc	44
(Ivory Coast) Friend’s Basketball Association	49
(Rwanda) APR	59

Semifinals
(Egypt) Al Ahly	65
(Senegal) ASC Ville de Dakar	64
(Mozambique) Ferroviário de Maputo	86
(Rwanda) APR	72

Final
(Egypt) Al Ahly	72
(Mozambique) Ferroviário de Maputo	81
Third place game
(Senegal) ASC Ville de Dakar	94
(Rwanda) APR (OT)	96

==== Quarterfinals ====
13 December 2024
12:00

Boxscore

Al Ahly (Egypt)	89–36	(Democratic Republic of the Congo) CNSS
Scoring by quarter: 27–5, 25–10, 21–8, 16–13
Pts: Fair 20; Rebs: Elgedawy 9 Asts: Mohamed 4		Pts: Dramé 10; Rebs: Tshoto 8 Asts: Londa 2

Marius Ndiaye Stadium, Dakar
Attendance: 150
Referees: Monicca Nassuuna (UGA), Samuel Ikirezi Ngaju (RWA), Maria Bagnath (MOZ)

13 December 2024
15:00

Boxscore

Friend’s Basketball Association (Ivory Coast)	49–59	(Rwanda) APR
Scoring by quarter: 13–14, 15–9, 15–14, 6–22
Pts: Konaté, Tolo 9 Rebs: Ouraga 13; Asts: Tounkara 4		Pts: Pellington 21; Rebs: Lucas 9 Asts: Lucas 6

Marius Ndiaye Stadium, Dakar
Attendance: 300

13 December 2024
18:00

Boxscore

REG (Rwanda)	57–61 (OT)	(Senegal) ASC Ville de Dakar
Scoring by quarter: 18–8, 11–15, 19–12, 7–20, Overtime: 2–6
Pts: Nezerwa, Pointer 15; Rebs: Ly 18; Asts: Philoxy 7		Pts: Dabou 16; Rebs: Pouye 11; Asts: Sissoko 4

Marius Ndiaye Stadium, Dakar
Attendance: 4,300

13 December 2024
21:00

Boxscore

Ferroviário de Maputo (Mozambique)	65–44	(Senegal) Jeanne D'Arc
Scoring by quarter: 22–12, 8–14, 19–7, 16–11
Pts: Chiziane 20; Rebs: Mucauro 11; Asts: Veloso 7		Pts: Konteye 12; Rebs: Sy 10; Asts: Niang 4

Marius Ndiaye Stadium, Dakar
Attendance: 150

==== Semifinals ====
14 December 2024
18:00

Boxscore

Al Ahly (Egypt)	65–64	(Senegal) ASC Ville de Dakar
Scoring by quarter: 11–18, 21–13, 8–20, 25–13
Pts: Kané 18; Rebs: Kané 9 Asts: Kané 6		Pts: Dabou 20; Rebs: three players 6 Asts: Sissoko 6

Marius Ndiaye Stadium, Dakar
Attendance: 4,000

14 December 2024
21:00

Boxscore

Ferroviário de Maputo (Mozambique)	86–72	(Rwanda) APR
Scoring by quarter: 16–25, 17–26, 30–15, 23–6
Pts: Cossa 31; Rebs: Covane 18; Asts: Mucauro 7		Pts: Diakité, Lucas 19; Rebs: Pellington 8 Asts: Pellington 5

Marius Ndiaye Stadium, Dakar
Attendance: 300

==== Third place ====
15 December 2024
15:30

Boxscore

ASC Ville de Dakar (Senegal)	94–96 (OT)	(Rwanda) APR
Scoring by quarter: 11–23, 26–14, 21–22, 24–23, Overtime: 12–14
Pts: Mbaye 25; Rebs: Mbodj 14; Asts: Sissoko 9		Pts: Lucas 30; Rebs: Bell 10; Asts: Lucas 7

Marius Ndiaye Stadium, Dakar
Attendance: 1,000

==== Final ====
15 December 2024
18:00

Boxscore

Al Ahly (Egypt)	72–81	(Mozambique) Ferroviário de Maputo
Scoring by quarter: 13–26, 25–20, 12–21, 22–14
Pts: Elgedawy, Richardson 19; Rebs: Elgedawy 17; Asts: Moussa 5		Pts: Mucauro, Veloso 18; Rebs: Veloso 11; Asts: Veloso 5

Marius Ndiaye Stadium, Dakar
Attendance: 2,000

=== 5–8 placement bracket ===
Semifinals
(Democratic Republic of the Congo) CNSS	46
(Rwanda) REG	58
(Senegal) Jeanne D'Arc	49
(Ivory Coast) Friend’s Basketball Association	53

Fifth place
(Rwanda) REG	47
(Ivory Coast) Friend’s Basketball Association (OT)	55
Seventh place
(Democratic Republic of the Congo) CNSS	71
(Senegal) Jeanne D'Arc	37

==== 5–8 Semifinals ====
14 December 2024
12:00

Boxscore

CNSS (Democratic Republic of the Congo)	46–58	(Rwanda) REG
Scoring by quarter: 12–19, 13–21, 10–8, 11–10
Pts: Dramé 17; Rebs: Tshoto 14; Asts: Ndoye 4		Pts: Nezerwa 12; Rebs: Ly 18; Asts: Philoxy 5

Marius Ndiaye Stadium, Dakar
Attendance: 250

14 December 2024
15:00

Boxscore

Jeanne D'Arc (Senegal)	49–53	(Ivory Coast) Friend’s Basketball Association
Scoring by quarter: 14–14, 5–12, 15–13, 15–14
Pts: Y. Fall 17; Rebs: Konteye 14; Asts: C. Fall 6		Pts: Tounkara 13; Rebs: Guindo 10; Asts: Traoré 6

Marius Ndiaye Stadium, Dakar
Referees: 55

==== Seventh place game ====
15 December 2024
10:30

Boxscore

CNSS (Democratic Republic of the Congo)	71–37	(Senegal) Jeanne D'Arc
Scoring by quarter: 15–17, 22–5, 18–14, 16–1
Pts: Ngobeleza 19; Rebs: Kabongo 10; Asts: Mbelu 6		Pts: Konteye, Y. Fall 8 Rebs: Sembene 9 Asts: Niang 4

Marius Ndiaye Stadium, Dakar
Attendance: 50

==== Fifth place game ====
15 December 2024
13:00

Boxscore

REG (Rwanda)	47–55 (OT)	(Ivory Coast) Friend’s Basketball Association
Scoring by quarter: 11–8, 7–16, 18–12, 11–11, Overtime: 0–8
Pts: Philoxy 12; Rebs: Nezerwa 15; Asts: Pointer 6		Pts: Berthé 14; Rebs: Tolo 13; Asts: Tounkara 4

Marius Ndiaye Stadium, Dakar
Attendance: 103

=== 9–12 placement rounds ===
Ninth place game
(Egypt) Alexandria Sporting Club	61
(Nigeria) Mountain of Fire and Miracles	48

==== Nifth place game ====
12 December 2024
18:00

Boxscore

Alexandria Sporting Club (Egypt)	61–48	(Nigeria) Mountain of Fire and Miracles
Scoring by quarter: 14–9, 16–6, 15–15, 16–18
Pts: Tillman 17; Rebs: Tillman 5		Pts: Hembam 15

Marius Ndiaye Stadium, Dakar

Eleventh place game
(Cameroon) FAP	65
(Democratic Republic of the Congo) ASB Makomeno	50

==== Eleventh place game ====
12 December 2024
15:00

Boxscore

FAP (Cameroon)	65–50	(Democratic Republic of the Congo) ASB Makomeno
Scoring by quarter: 16–11, 14–13, 16–20, 19–6
Pts: Campbell 15; Rebs: McKenzie 16; Asts: Campbell 9		Pts: Traoré 13; Rebs: Traoré 11; Asts: Marondera 5

Marius Ndiaye Stadium, Dakar
Attendance: 50

== Final standing ==
Rank	Team
1st place, gold medalist(s)	(Mozambique) Ferroviário de Maputo
2nd place, silver medalist(s)	(Egypt) Al Ahly
3rd place, bronze medalist(s)	(Rwanda) APR
4	(Senegal) ASC Ville de Dakar
5	(Ivory Coast) Friend’s Basketball Association
6	(Rwanda) REG
7	(Democratic Republic of the Congo) CNSS
8	(Senegal) Jeanne D'Arc
9	(Egypt) Alexandria Sporting Club
10	(Nigeria) Mountain of Fire and Miracles
11	(Cameroon) FAP
12	(Democratic Republic of the Congo) ASB Makomeno
