= 2022 FIBA Africa Women's Champions Cup =

26th season of the FIBA Africa Women's Champions Cup

- Season: 2022
- Dates: December 9 – December 17, 2022
- Games played: 32
- Teams: 9

Regular season
- Season MVP: (Egypt) Hagar Amer (Sporting Alexandria)

Finals
- Champions: (Egypt) Sporting Alexandria (1st title)
- Runners-up: (Mozambique) Costa do Sol
- Third place: (Mozambique) Ferroviário de Maputo
- Fourth place: (Angola) Interclube

Statistical leaders
Points	(Nigeria) Ifunanya Okoro	20.9
Rebounds	(Kenya) Madina Okot	12.3
Assists	(Kenya) Natalie Mwagale	4.3

The 2022 FIBA Africa Women's Champions Cup was the 26th season of the FIBA Africa Women's Clubs Champions Cup, the top tier basketball league for women's teams in Africa. The tournament began on December 9 and ended on December 17, 2022, and was entirely hosted in the Eduardo Mondlane University Gym in Maputo, the capital of Mozambique. It is the third time Maputo hosts the league after 2016 and 2018. The league returned after a 2-year hiatus due to the COVID-19 pandemic.

Sporting Alexandria won their first continental title, after beating Costa do Sol in the finals, becoming the first Egyptian team to win the competition.

== Teams ==
Ten teams qualified. OverDose Up Station from Cameroon was forced to withdraw.

Club
~~(Cameroon) OverDose Up Station~~
(Democratic Republic of the Congo) CNSS
(Egypt) Sporting Alexandria
(Kenya) KPA
(Mozambique) Ferroviário de Maputo
(Mozambique) Costa del Sol
(Senegal) ASC Ville de Dakar
(Benin) Énergie BBC
(Angola) Interclube
(Rwanda) APR

== Format ==
The ten teams are divided in two groups of five. The first four qualify for the play-offs which are all played in single-elimination games.

== Group phase ==
=== Group A ===
Pos	Team	Pld	W	L	PF	PA	PD	Pts	Qualification
1	(Angola) Interclube	4	4	0	310	248	+62	8	Advance to quarter-finals
2	(Mozambique) Costa do Sol (H)	4	3	1	266	266	0	7	Advance to quarter-finals
3	(Kenya) KPA	4	2	2	264	253	+11	6	Advance to quarter-finals
4	(Democratic Republic of the Congo) CNSS	4	1	3	255	271	−16	5	Advance to quarter-finals
5	(Benin) Énergie	4	0	4	211	310	−99	4	

Source: FIBA
(H) Hosts

=== Group B ===
Pos	Team	Pld	W	L	PF	PA	PD	Pts	Qualification
1	(Mozambique) Ferroviário de Maputo (H)	3	3	0	219	168	+51	6	Advance to quarter-finals
2	(Egypt) Sporting Alexandria	3	2	1	225	197	+28	5	Advance to quarter-finals
3	(Senegal) Ville de Dakar	3	1	2	160	164	−4	4	Advance to quarter-finals
4	(Rwanda) APR	3	0	3	160	224	−64	3	Advance to quarter-finals

Source: FIBA
(H) Hosts

== Play-offs ==
Fifth place
(Kenya) KPA	51
(Senegal) ASC Ville de Dakar	71
Seventh place
(Rwanda) APR	53
(Democratic Republic of the Congo) CNSS	72

Consolation semifinals
(Rwanda) APR	38
(Kenya) KPA	67
(Democratic Republic of the Congo) CNSS	43
(Senegal) ASC Ville de Dakar	74

Quarterfinals
(Angola) Interclube	94
(Rwanda) APR	53
(Egypt) Sporting Alexandria	76
(Kenya) KPA	70
(Mozambique) Costa do Sol	53
(Senegal) ASC Ville de Dakar	37
(Mozambique) Ferroviário Maputo	75
(Democratic Republic of the Congo) CNSS	43

Semi-finals
(Egypt) Sporting Alexandria	100
(Angola) Interclube	82
(Mozambique) Ferroviário Maputo	49
(Mozambique) Costa do Sol	53

Finals
(Egypt) Sporting Alexandria	65
(Mozambique) Costa do Sol	58
Third place game
(Angola) Interclube	67
(Mozambique) Ferroviário Maputo	71

=== Semi-finals ===
15 December
16:00

Report

Interclube (Angola)	82–100	(Egypt) Sporting Alexandria
Scoring by quarter: 22–28, 18–23, 22–31, 20–18
Pts: Lucas 23; Rebs: Manuel 9 Asts: Gala 4		Pts: Dillard 21; Rebs: Amer 10; Asts: Dillard 6

Eduardo Mondlane University, Maputo

15 December
18:30

Report

Ferroviário de Maputo (Mozambique)	49–53	(Mozambique) Costa do Sol
Scoring by quarter: 14–11, 16–16, 11–17, 8–9
Pts: Shumpert 17; Rebs: Jenkins 8 Asts: Veloso 2		Pts: Lhavanguane 17; Rebs: Rafael 10; Asts: Da Ofelia 3

Eduardo Mondlane University, Maputo

=== Third place game ===
17 December
16:00

Report

Interclube (Angola)	67–71	(Mozambique) Ferroviário de Maputo
Scoring by quarter: 14–14, 17–18, 20–23, 16–16
Pts: Matiquite 18; Rebs: Manuel 11; Asts: Gala 4		Pts: Mabjaia 20; Rebs: Jenkins 9 Asts: Mafanela 3

Eduardo Mondlane University, Maputo

=== Final ===
17 December
18:30

Report

Sporting Alexandria (Egypt)	65–58	(Mozambique) Costa do Sol
Scoring by quarter: 16–18, 20–21, 19–8, 10–11
Pts: Dillard 21; Rebs: Amer 7 Asts: Moussa 5		Pts: Mucauro 15; Rebs: Mucauro 8 Asts: Lhavanguane 4

Eduardo Mondlane University, Maputo

== All-Tournament Team ==
The all-tournament team and Most Valuable Player were announced after the final.

- (Egypt) Hagar Amer (Sporting Alexandria) – MVP
- (Egypt) Reem Moussa (Sporting Alexandria)
- (Mozambique) Ingvild Mucauro (Costa do Sol)
- (Mozambique) Eleuteria Lhavanguane (Costa do Sol)
- (Nigeria) Ifunaya Okoro (KPA)
