= 2023 Africa Women's Basketball League =

27th season of the FIBA AWBL

- League: FIBA Africa Women's Basketball League
- Season: 2023
- Dates: 9–17 December 2023
- Teams: 10

Finals
- Champions: (Egypt) Sporting Alexandria (2nd title)
- Runners-up: (Kenya) KPA
- Third place: (Angola) Interclube
- Fourth place: (Rwanda) REG

Awards
- MVP: Cierra Dillard (Sporting Alexandria)

Statistical leaders
- Points: Tiffany Mitchell (REG)

Seasons
- ← 2022 2024 →

The 2023 FIBA Africa Women's Basketball League (FIBA AWBL) was the 27th season of the FIBA Africa Women's Basketball League, the top tier basketball league for women's teams in Africa. The tournament began on 8 December and ended on 17 December 2023, and was held entirely in Cairo, the capital of Egypt. This was the first season under the new name.

Sporting Alexandria were the defending champions, having defeated Maputo in the previous season's final. Sporting successfully defended its title after finishing with a 7–0 record and winning all games by a wide margin.

== Name change ==
On 15 December 2022, FIBA Africa changed the name of the tournament to the Africa Women's Basketball League.

== Qualification ==
Nine teams qualified through qualifying tournaments that were organised in the FIBA Africa zones, while Sporting Alexandria automatically qualified as hosts of the tournament.

Type	Date	Location	Vacancies	Qualified	Ref.
Host team			1	(Egypt) Sporting Alexandria	
Zone 3	11-19 December 2023	Abuja, Nigeria	2	Nigeria Customs	
Zone 3	11-19 December 2023	Abuja, Nigeria	2	(Benin) ASPAC	
Zone 4	3–5 November 2023	Yaoundé, Cameroon	2	(Cameroon) OverDose Up Station	
Zone 4	3–5 November 2023	Yaoundé, Cameroon	2	(Cameroon) Université de Douala	
Zone 5	28 October–4 November 2023	Kigali, Rwanda	3	(Kenya) KPA	
Zone 5	28 October–4 November 2023	Kigali, Rwanda	3	(Kenya) Equity Bank	
Zone 5	28 October–4 November 2023	Kigali, Rwanda	3	(Rwanda) REG	
Zone 6	Not held		1	(Angola) Interclube	
Wild card			1	(Democratic Republic of the Congo) CNSS	
Total			10		

== Format ==
The ten teams are divided in two groups of five. The first four qualify for the play-offs which are all played in single-elimination games.

== Group phase ==
The groups were announced by FIBA on 10 December 2023.

=== Group A ===
Pos	Team	Pld	W	L	GF	GA	GD	Pts	Qualification	SPO	KPA	NCS	UDO	CNSS
1	(Egypt) Sporting Alexandria (H)	4	4	0	411	224	+187	8	Advance to quarterfinals	—	102–77	—	—	98–41
2	(Kenya) KPA	4	3	1	306	260	+46	7	Advance to quarterfinals	—	—	—	74–59	82–46
3	Nigeria Customs	4	2	2	233	272	−39	6	Advance to quarterfinals	57–96	53–73	—	—	—
4	(Cameroon) Université de Douala	4	1	3	222	311	−89	5	Advance to quarterfinals	49–115	—	46–57	—	—
5	(Democratic Republic of the Congo) CNSS	4	0	4	209	314	−105	4	9–10 Classification match	—	—	57–66	65–68	—

Source: FIBA AWBL
Rules for classification: 1) Points; 2) Head-to-head results; 3) Points difference; 4) Points scored.
(H) Hosts

=== Group B ===
Pos	Team	Pld	W	L	GF	GA	GD	Pts	Qualification	REG	GDI	EQU	OVE	ASPAC
1	(Rwanda) REG	4	4	0	362	249	+113	8	Advance to quarterfinals	—	96–89	—	86–45	—
2	(Angola) Interclube	4	3	1	324	228	+96	7	Advance to quarterfinals		—	80–55	—	79–34
3	(Kenya) Equity Bank	4	2	2	268	306	−38	6	Advance to quarterfinals	50–84	—	—	76–73	—
4	(Cameroon) OverDose Up Station	4	1	3	238	290	−52	5	Advance to quarterfinals	—	43–76	—	—	77–52
5	(Benin) ASPAC	4	0	4	220	339	−119	4	9–10 Classification match	65–96	—	69–87	—	—

Source: FIBA AWBL
Rules for classification: 1) Points; 2) Head-to-head results; 3) Points difference; 4) Points scored.

== Classification round ==
=== 9th-10th place game ===
Team 1	Score	Team 2
CNSS (Democratic Republic of the Congo)		(Benin) ASPAC

== Final round ==
Fifth place
Nigeria Customs	83
(Kenya) Equity Bank	53
Seventh place
(Cameroon) Université de Douala	0
(Cameroon) OverDose Up Station	20

Consolation semifinals
(Cameroon) Université de Douala	58
Nigeria Customs	67
(Cameroon) Université de Douala	54
(Kenya) Equity Bank	75

Quarterfinals
(Cameroon) OverDose Up Station	55
(Egypt) Sporting Alexandria	105
Nigeria Customs	65
(Angola) Interclube	89
(Cameroon) Université de Douala	54
(Rwanda) REG	85
(Kenya) Equity Bank	66
(Kenya) KPA	81

Semi-finals
(Egypt) Sporting Alexandria	100
(Angola) Interclube	74
(Rwanda) REG	97
(Kenya) KPA	101

Finals
(Egypt) Sporting Alexandria	103
(Kenya) KPA	59
Third place game
(Angola) Interclube	83
(Rwanda) REG	59

== Individual awards ==
The awards were announced after the ending of the final on 17 December.

MVP Award
(Senegal) Cierra Dillard (Sporting Alexandria)
All-Star Team
(Senegal) Cierra Dillard (Sporting Alexandria)
(Egypt) Hagar Amer (Sporting Alexandria)
(Kenya) Madina Okot (KPA)
(Rwanda) Destiney Philox (REG)
(Kenya) Victoria Reynolds (KPA)
