= 2017 FIBA Africa Women's Clubs Champions Cup =

2017 FIBA Africa Champions Cup for Women
23rd FIBA Africa Champions Cup for Women

Tournament details
- Host country: Angola
- Dates: November 11 – 19
- Teams: 9 (from 53 federations)
- Venue: 1 (in 1 host city)

Final positions
- Champions: Angola (1º de Agosto's 3rd title; Angola's 8th title)

Tournament statistics
- MVP: (United States) Alicia DeVaughn
- Top scorer: (United States) Wilson 16.4
- Top rebounds: (Kenya) Koranga 10.3
- Top assists: (Kenya) Mwangale 6.3
- PPG (Team): (Angola) Interclube 84.1
- RPG (Team): (Angola) Interclube 49.6
- APG (Team): (Mozambique) Ferroviário 17.2

Official website
- 2017 FIBA Africa Women's Clubs Champions Cup

The 2017 FIBA Africa Women's Clubs Champions Cup (23rd edition), was an international basketball tournament that took place at the Pavilhão Multiusos do Kilamba, in Luanda, Angola, from November 11 to 19, 2017. The tournament, organized by FIBA Africa and hosted by Grupo Desportivo Interclube, was contested by 9 teams split into 2 groups, the first four of each group qualifying for the knock-out stage (quarter, semis and final).

The tournament was won by Primeiro de Agosto from Angola.

== Draw ==
Group A	Group B
(Kenya) Equity Bank (Nigeria) First Bank (Algeria) GS Pétroliers (Angola) Interclube (Democratic Republic of the Congo) Vita Club	(Mozambique) Ferroviário de Maputo; Kenya Ports Authority (Angola) Primeiro de Agosto (Democratic Republic of the Congo) Motema Pembe

== Preliminary rounds ==
Times given below are in local WAT (UTC+1).

Qualified for the quarter-finals
Relegated to the 9th place

=== Group A ===
	Teams	M	W	L	PF	PA	Diff	P
1.	(Angola) Interclube	4	4	0	330	203	+127	8
2.	(Nigeria) First Bank	4	3	1	271	242	+29	7
3.	(Algeria) GS Pétroliers	4	2	2	213	209	+4	6
4.	(Kenya) Equity Bank	4	1	3	172	282	-110	5
5.	(Democratic Republic of the Congo) Vita Club	4	0	4	236	286	-50	4

Sat, 11 Nov 2017
16:45

Boxscore

First Bank (Nigeria)	62–43	(Kenya) Equity Bank
Scoring by quarter: 15-11, 13-10, 12-11, 22-11
Pts: Wilson 12; Rebs: Udeaja 5 Asts: Isuambuk 5		Pts: Luvandwa 14; Rebs: Wanyama 8 Asts: Wanyama 3

Arena do Kilamba, Luanda

Sat, 11 Nov 2017
19:00

Boxscore

Interclube (Angola)	62–45	(Algeria) GS Pétroliers
Scoring by quarter: 15-13, 18-6, 11-8, 18-18
Pts: Lucas 15; Rebs: Ngiendula 8 Asts: Ngiendula 2		Pts: Makiese 16; Rebs: Nyota 13; Asts: Fantazi 4

Arena do Kilamba, Luanda

Sun, 12 Nov 2017
14:30

Boxscore

GS Pétroliers (Algeria)	59–32	(Kenya) Equity Bank
Scoring by quarter: 11-7, 18-4, 10-13, 20-8
Pts: Makiese 14; Rebs: Makiese 10; Asts: Taïbi 5		Pts: Luvandwa 8 Rebs: B.Okoth, Wanyama 5 Asts: Luvandwa 3

Arena do Kilamba, Luanda

Sun, 12 Nov 2017
19:00

Boxscore

Interclube (Angola)	77–49	(Democratic Republic of the Congo) Vita Club
Scoring by quarter: 26-7, 9-14, 22-16, 20-12
Pts: Felizarda 17; Rebs: Madu 8 Asts: Lucas 4		Pts: Haongi 14; Rebs: Haongi 11; Asts: four players 1

Arena do Kilamba, Luanda

Mon, 13 Nov 2017
16:45

Boxscore

Vita Club (Democratic Republic of the Congo)	64–76	(Nigeria) First Bank
Scoring by quarter: 12-16, 14-20, 16-20, 22-20
Pts: Haongi, Maweja 15; Rebs: Haongi, Maweja 6 Asts: Matokio 5		Pts: Akashili 21; Rebs: Akaraiwe 6 Asts: Wilson 6

Arena do Kilamba, Luanda

Mon, 13 Nov 2017
19:00

Boxscore

Equity Bank (Kenya)	30–99	(Angola) Interclube
Scoring by quarter: 8-29, 6-18, 9-29, 7-23
Pts: B.Okoth 11; Rebs: B.Okoth 10; Asts: Mjomba 2		Pts: Michael 24; Rebs: Madu 9 Asts: Rosemira, Lucas 5

Arena do Kilamba, Luanda

Tue, 14 Nov 2017
14:30

Boxscore

Equity Bank (Kenya)	67–62 (OT)	(Democratic Republic of the Congo) Vita Club
Scoring by quarter: 15-15, 13-15, 11-12, 17-14, Overtime: 11-6
Pts: Wanyama 20; Rebs: Wanyama 16; Asts: Luvandwa 5		Pts: Maweja 12; Rebs: Maweja, Muadi 11; Asts: Teba 6

Arena do Kilamba, Luanda

Tue, 14 Nov 2017
16:45

Boxscore

GS Pétroliers (Algeria)	43–54	(Nigeria) First Bank
Scoring by quarter: 22-7, 6-11, 6-14, 9-22
Pts: Makiese, Fantazi 9 Rebs: Makiese 11; Asts: six players 2		Pts: Wilson 14; Rebs: Akaraiwe 8 Asts: Wilson 2

Arena do Kilamba, Luanda

Wed, 15 Nov 2017
:00

Boxscore

Vita Club (Democratic Republic of the Congo)	61–66	(Algeria) GS Pétroliers
Scoring by quarter: 13-12, 15-29, 15-13, 18-12
Pts: Kalombo 26; Rebs: Muadi 10; Asts: Balongya 7		Pts: Makiese 26; Rebs: Makiese 12; Asts: Boudjerima 8

Arena do Kilamba, Luanda

Wed, 15 Nov 2017
19:00

Boxscore

First Bank (Nigeria)	79–92	(Angola) Interclube
Scoring by quarter: 21-24, 17-26, 15-24, 26-18
Pts: Wilson 22; Rebs: Udeaja 13; Asts: Akaraiwe 4		Pts: Lucas 20; Rebs: Madu 12; Asts: Lucas 7

Arena do Kilamba, Luanda

Qualified for the quarter-finals

=== Group B ===
	Teams	M	W	L	PF	PA	Diff	P
1.	(Angola) Primeiro de Agosto	3	3	0	212	144	+68	6
2.	(Mozambique) Ferroviário de Maputo	3	2	1	200	146	+54	5
3.	(Kenya) Ports Authority	3	1	2	147	194	-47	4
4.	(Democratic Republic of the Congo) Motema Pembe	3	0	3	125	200	-75	3

Sun, 12 Nov 2017
12:15

Boxscore

Ferrov Maputo (Mozambique)	67–38	(Democratic Republic of the Congo) Motema Pembe
Scoring by quarter: 18-6, 22-8, 18-10, 9-14
Pts: Eleutéria 12; Rebs: Gimo 8 Asts: Ornélia 7		Pts: Nyoka, Nguz 11; Rebs: Madamu 17; Asts: Nyoka 6

Arena do Kilamba, Luanda

Sun, 12 Nov 2017
16:45

Boxscore

Ports Authority (Kenya)	43–75	(Angola) 1º de Agosto
Scoring by quarter: 10-14, 9-20, 13-16, 11-25
Pts: Koranga 16; Rebs: Koranga 8 Asts: Mwangale, Okumu 4		Pts: Leia 13; Rebs: Luísa 11; Asts: Rosa, Ana 4

Arena do Kilamba, Luanda

Tue, 14 Nov 2017
12:15

Boxscore

Ports Authority (Kenya)	70–51	(Democratic Republic of the Congo) Motema Pembe
Scoring by quarter: 22-16, 12-13, 19-10, 17-12
Pts: Koranga 19; Rebs: Koranga 15; Asts: Mwangale 8		Pts: Nyoka, Onyango 12; Rebs: Nyoka 7 Asts: four players 2

Arena do Kilamba, Luanda

Tue, 14 Nov 2017
19:00

Boxscore

1º de Agosto (Angola)	74–65	(Mozambique) Ferrov Maputo
Scoring by quarter: 19-21, 21-11, 23-17, 11-16
Pts: Alicia 22; Rebs: Leia 9 Asts: Fineza 8		Pts: Gimo 17; Rebs: Odélia 7 Asts: Ingvild 4

Arena do Kilamba, Luanda

Wed, 15 Nov 2017
14:30

Boxscore

Ferrov Maputo (Mozambique)	68–34	(Kenya) Ports Authority
Scoring by quarter: 15-10, 9-3, 16-11, 28-10
Pts: Ingvild 14; Rebs: Rute 8 Asts: Dulce 5		Pts: Maithima 9 Rebs: Maithima 10; Asts: four players 1

Arena do Kilamba, Luanda

Wed, 15 Nov 2017
16:45

Boxscore

1º de Agosto (Angola)	63–36	(Democratic Republic of the Congo) Motema Pembe
Scoring by quarter: 8-9, 22-15, 21-6, 12-6
Pts: Leia 23; Rebs: Leia, Avelina 8 Asts: four players 2		Pts: Kayolo 10; Rebs: Kayolo 7 Asts: Kayolo 4

Arena do Kilamba, Luanda

== Knockout stage ==
Championship bracket

Quarter-finals
Fri 17 Nov 2017 - 16:45
(Angola) 1º de Agosto	65
(Kenya) Equity Bank	42
Fri 17 Nov 2017 - 12:15
(Nigeria) First Bank	84
(Kenya) Ports Authority	63
Fri 17 Nov 2017 - 14:30
(Mozambique) Ferroviário	83
(Algeria) GS Pétroliers	44
Fri 17 Nov 2017 - 19:00
(Angola) Interclube	68
(Democratic Republic of the Congo) Motema Pembe	38

Semi-finals
Sat 18 Nov 2017 - 16:45
(Angola) 1º de Agosto	64
(Nigeria) First Bank	44
Sat 18 Nov 2017 - 19:00
(Mozambique) Ferroviário	71
(Angola) Interclube	62

Final
Sun 19 Nov 2017 - 19:00
(Angola) 1º de Agosto	65
(Mozambique) Ferroviário	51
Third place
Sun 19 Nov 2017 - 16:45
(Nigeria) First Bank	71
(Angola) Interclube	60

5-8th bracket

5-8th Place
Sat 18 Nov 2017 - 12:15
(Kenya) Ports Authority	63
(Kenya) Equity Bank	39
Sat 18 Nov 2017 - 14:30
(Algeria) GS Pétroliers	56
(Democratic Republic of the Congo) Motema Pembe	55

5th place
Sun 19 Nov 2017 - 14:30
(Kenya) Ports Authority	70
(Algeria) GS Pétroliers	54
7th place
Sun 19 Nov 2017 - 12:15
(Democratic Republic of the Congo) Motema Pembe	54
(Kenya) Equity Bank	39

=== Quarter finals ===
Fri, 17 Nov 2017
12:15

Boxscore

Ports Authority (Kenya)	63–84	(Nigeria) First Bank
Scoring by quarter: 19-20, 9-24, 14-22, 21-18
Pts: Maithima 15; Rebs: Koranga 10; Asts: Mwangale 9		Pts: Wilson 25; Rebs: Wilson 6 Asts: Wilson 5

Arena do Kilamba, Luanda

Fri, 17 Nov 2017
14:30

Boxscore

GS Pétroliers (Algeria)	44–83	(Mozambique) Ferrov Maputo
Scoring by quarter: 2-15, 6-24, 17-21, 19-23
Pts: Taïbi 19; Rebs: Taïbi 9 Asts: three players 3		Pts: Chan Liol 15; Rebs: Gimo 11; Asts: Ornélia, Ingvild 4

Arena do Kilamba, Luanda

Fri, 17 Nov 2017
16:45

Boxscore

Equity Bank (Kenya)	42–65	(Angola) 1º de Agosto
Scoring by quarter: 12-26, 5-9, 15-18, 10-12
Pts: B.Okoth 14; Rebs: B.Okoth 8 Asts: Luvandwa, Mjomba 3		Pts: Leia 11; Rebs: Luísa 8 Asts: Rosa 5

Arena do Kilamba, Luanda

Fri, 17 Nov 2017
19:00

Boxscore

Motema Pembe (Democratic Republic of the Congo)	38–68	(Angola) Interclube
Scoring by quarter: 10-15, 5-23, 11-15, 12-15
Pts: Nguz 10; Rebs: Ndiba 15; Asts: Loota 4		Pts: Felizarda 13; Rebs: Madu 9 Asts: Lucas 3

Arena do Kilamba, Luanda

=== 5th-8th place ===
Sat, 18 Nov 2017
12:15

Boxscore

Equity Bank (Kenya)	46–64	(Kenya) Ports Authority
Scoring by quarter: 22-24, 2-16, 13-19, 9-5
Pts: Luvandwa 18; Rebs: B.Okoth 7 Asts: Luvandwa 3		Pts: Maithima 15; Rebs: Koranga 10; Asts: Mwangale 8

Arena do Kilamba, Luanda

Sat, 18 Nov 2017
14:30

Boxscore

Motema Pembe (Democratic Republic of the Congo)	46–60	(Algeria) GS Pétroliers
Scoring by quarter: 13-6, 4-16, 11-21, 18-17
Pts: Nguz 16; Rebs: Nyoka 8 Asts: Mbokolo 5		Pts: Taïbi 23; Rebs: Makiese 12; Asts: Refes, Boudjerima 5

Arena do Kilamba, Luanda
Referees: Artur Bandeira (MOZ), Erick Omondi (KEN), Dorothy Okatch (BOT)

=== Semifinals ===
Sat, 18 Nov 2017
16:45

Boxscore

1º de Agosto (Angola)	64–44	(Nigeria) First Bank
Scoring by quarter: 20-9, 17-17, 7-14, 20-4
Pts: Alicia 17; Rebs: Luísa 11; Asts: four players 4		Pts: three players 10; Rebs: Akaraiwe 10; Asts: Wilson 3

Arena do Kilamba, Luanda

Sat, 18 Nov 2017
19:00

Boxscore

Interclube (Angola)	62–71	(Mozambique) Ferrov Maputo
Scoring by quarter: 14-12, 13-17, 22-15, 13-27
Pts: Felizarda 11; Rebs: Ngiendula 10; Asts: Merciana 6		Pts: Odélia 19; Rebs: Odélia 11; Asts: Vega 4

Arena do Kilamba, Luanda
Referees: Banza Tonton (COD), Annie Muchenu (ZIM), Aissatou Diagne (SEN)

=== 7th place ===
Sun, 19 Nov 2017
12:15

Boxscore

Motema Pembe (Democratic Republic of the Congo)	54–39	(Kenya) Equity Bank
Scoring by quarter: 12-8, 14-11, 15-13, 13-7
Pts: Loota 17; Rebs: Ndiba 10; Asts: Nyoka 5		Pts: Luvandwa 11; Rebs: D.Okoth 9 Asts: Luvandwa 3

Arena do Kilamba, Luanda

=== 5th place ===
Sun, 19 Nov 2017
14:30

Boxscore

GS Pétroliers (Algeria)	54–70	(Kenya) Ports Authority
Scoring by quarter: 14-10, 8-19, 13-25, 19-16
Pts: Makiese 16; Rebs: Makiese 11; Asts: Fantazi, Boudjerima 4		Pts: Mwangale 17; Rebs: Koranga 10; Asts: Mwangale 8

Arena do Kilamba, Luanda

=== Bronze medal game ===
Sun, 19 Nov 2017
16:45

Boxscore

Interclube (Angola)	61–70	(Nigeria) First Bank
Scoring by quarter: 21-22, 10-22, 15-13, 15-13
Pts: Lucas 14; Rebs: Eduarda 9 Asts: Rosemira 3		Pts: Okoye 21; Rebs: Okoye 11; Asts: Akashili 4

Arena do Kilamba, Luanda

=== Gold medal game ===
Sun, 19 Nov 2017
19:00

Boxscore

Ferrov Maputo (Mozambique)	51–65	(Angola) 1º de Agosto
Scoring by quarter: 8-12, 15-20, 8-15, 20-18
Pts: Odélia 14; Rebs: Odélia 7 Asts: Ingvild 4		Pts: Leia 23; Rebs: Leia 10; Asts: Rosa 6

Arena do Kilamba, Luanda
Referees: Nadege Zouzou (CIV), Joyce Muchenu (ZIM), Nadget Zenagui (ALG)

== Final standings ==
Rank	Team	Record
Gold medal	(Angola) Primeiro de Agosto	6–0
Silver medal	(Mozambique) Ferroviário de Maputo	4–2
Bronze medal	(Nigeria) First Bank	5–2
4.	(Angola) Interclube	5–2
5.	(Kenya) Ports Authority	3–3
6.	(Algeria) GS Pétroliers	3–4
7.	(Democratic Republic of the Congo) Motema Pembe	1–5
8.	(Kenya) Equity Bank	1–6
9.	(Democratic Republic of the Congo) Vita Club	0–4

== Statistical leaders ==
=== Individual Tournament Highs ===
Points

Rank	Name	G	Pts	PPG
1	(United States) Dominique Wilson	7	115	16.4
2	(Democratic Republic of the Congo) Ginette Makiese	7	111	15.9
3	(Mozambique) Leia Dongue	6	94	15.7
4	(United States) Alicia DeVaughn	6	84	14
5	(Nigeria) Nkechi Akashili	7	96	13.7
6	(Democratic Republic of the Congo) Ortice Haongi	4	51	12.8
7	(Algeria) Nesrine Taïbi	7	88	12.6
8	(Kenya) Felmas Koranga	6	74	12.3
9	(Democratic Republic of the Congo) Jeanine Kalombo	4	48	12
10	(Angola) Italee Lucas	8	95	11.9

Rebounds

Rank	Name	G	Rbs	RPG
1	(Kenya) Felmas Koranga	6	62	10.3
2	(Democratic Republic of the Congo) Ginette Makiese	7	72	10.3
3	(Democratic Republic of the Congo) Alliance Sungulia	7	67	9.6
4	(Democratic Republic of the Congo) Ortice Haongi	4	35	8.8
5	(Nigeria) Ndidi Madu	8	61	7.6
6	(Democratic Republic of the Congo) Mireille Nyota	4	30	7.5
7	(Angola) Luísa Tomás	6	43	7.2
8	(Kenya) Mercy Wanyama	7	47	6.7
9	(Mozambique) Odélia Mafanela	6	40	6.7
10	(Kenya) Belinda Okoth	7	46	6.6

Assists

Rank	Name	G	Ast	APG
1	(Kenya) Natalie Mwangale	6	38	6.3
2	(Angola) Fineza Eusébio	6	23	3.8
2	(Angola) Rosa Gala	6	23	3.8
4	(Angola) Italee Lucas	8	29	3.6
5	(Algeria) Samiya Boudjerima	7	25	3.6
6	(Angola) Ornélia Mutombene	6	20	3.3
6	(Democratic Republic of the Congo) Cipy Loota	6	20	3.3
8	(Algeria) Radia Fantazi	7	23	3.3
9	(Democratic Republic of the Congo) Naura Balongya	4	13	3.3
10	(United States) Dominique Wilson	7	22	3.1

Steals

Rank	Name	G	Sts	SPG
1	(Mozambique) Odélia Mafanela	6	19	3.2
2	(Democratic Republic of the Congo) Ginette Makiese	7	20	2.9
3	(Mozambique) Ingvild Mucauro	6	17	2.8
4	(Democratic Republic of the Congo) Gracia Nguz	6	16	2.7
5	(Algeria) Samiya Boudjerima	7	18	2.6
5	(Kenya) Hilda Luvandwa	7	18	2.6
5	(Kenya) Betty Mjomba	7	18	2.6
8	(Mozambique) Ornélia Mutombene	6	15	2.5
9	(Algeria) Nesrine Taïbi	7	17	2.4
10	(Mozambique) Dulce Mabjaia	6	14	2.3

Blocks

Rank	Name	G	Bks	BPG
1	(Nigeria) Ndidi Madu	8	8	1.0
2	(Nigeria) Cecilia Okoye	7	6	0.9
3	(Democratic Republic of the Congo) Jeanine Kalombo	4	3	0.8
4	(United States) Alicia DeVaughn	6	4	0.7
4	(Angola) Sónia Ndoniema	6	4	0.7
4	(Angola) Luísa Tomás	6	4	0.7
7	(Democratic Republic of the Congo) Ginette Makiese	7	4	0.6
7	(Democratic Republic of the Congo) Alliance Sungulia	7	4	0.6
9	(Angola) Joana António	8	4	0.5
10	(Mozambique) Leia Dongue	6	3	0.5

Turnovers

Rank	Name	G	Tos	TPG
1	(Democratic Republic of the Congo) Gracia Nguz	6	37	6.2
2	(Democratic Republic of the Congo) Cipy Loota	6	34	5.7
3	(Democratic Republic of the Congo) Cecile Nyoka	7	31	4.4
3	(Algeria) Nesrine Taïbi	7	31	4.4
5	(Kenya) Natalie Mwangale	6	26	4.3
6	(Algeria) Radia Fantazi	7	30	4.3
7	(Democratic Republic of the Congo) Ortice Haongi	4	17	4.3
8	(Kenya) Betty Maithima	6	25	4.2
9	(Kenya) Betty Mjomba	7	29	4.1
10	(Kenya) Selina Okumu	6	22	3.7

2-point field goal percentage

Pos	Name	A	M	%
1	(United States) Alicia DeVaughn	47	35	74.5
2	(Mozambique) Leia Dongue	50	32	64.0
3	(Angola) Eduarda Gabriel	48	25	52.1
3	(Algeria) Nesrine Taïbi	48	25	52.1
5	(Kenya) Hilda Luvandwa	52	25	48.1
6	(Kenya) Belinda Okoth	51	23	45.1
7	(Democratic Republic of the Congo) Ginette Makiese	91	41	45.1
8	(United States) Dominique Wilson	50	22	44.0
9	(Nigeria) Nkechi Akashili	71	31	43.7
10	(Democratic Republic of the Congo) Ortice Haongi	44	19	43.2

3-point field goal percentage

Pos	Name	A	M	%
1	(Angola) Ana Gonçalves	13	6	46.2
2	(Nigeria) Nkechi Akashili	16	7	43.8
3	(United States) Nicole Michael	21	9	42.9
4	(Angola) Felizarda Jorge	37	14	37.8
5	(United States) Dominique Wilson	41	15	36.6
6	(Angola) Italee Lucas	49	17	34.7
7	(Mozambique) Ana Jaime	38	13	34.2
8	(Angola) Elizabeth Mateus	21	7	33.3
9	(Angola) Rosa Gala	15	5	33.3
9	(Kenya) Georgia Otieno	15	5	33.3

Free throw percentage

Pos	Name	A	M	%
1	(Democratic Republic of the Congo) Jeanine Kalombo	16	15	93.8
2	(Mozambique) Leia Dongue	20	18	90.0
3	(United States) Dominique Wilson	31	26	83.9
4	(Mozambique) Odélia Mafanela	34	27	79.4
5	(Nigeria) Priscilla Udeaja	23	18	78.3
6	(Democratic Republic of the Congo) Ginette Makiese	34	26	76.5
7	(United States) Alicia DeVaughn	19	14	73.7
8	(Kenya) Natalie Mwangale	29	21	72.4
9	(Mozambique) Ingvild Mucauro	18	13	72.2
10	(Angola) Fineza Eusébio	21	14	66.7

=== Individual Game Highs ===
Department	Name	Total	Opponent
Points	(Democratic Republic of the Congo) Jeanine Kalombo (Democratic Republic of the Congo) Ginette Makiese	26	(Algeria) GS Pétroliers (Democratic Republic of the Congo) Vita Club
Rebounds	(Democratic Republic of the Congo) Gabriella Madamu	17	(Mozambique) Ferroviário
Assists	(Kenya) Natalie Mwangale	9	(Nigeria) First Bank
Steals	four players	7	
Blocks	three players	3	
2-point field goal percentage	(United States) Alicia DeVaughn	100% (6/6)	(Kenya) Ports Authority
3-point field goal percentage	(Algeria) Ikbal Chenaf	100% (3/3)	(Kenya) Equity Bank
Free throw percentage	(United States) Dominique Wilson	100% (10/10)	(Algeria) GS Pétroliers
Turnovers	(Democratic Republic of the Congo) Gracia Nguz	13	(Mozambique) Ferroviário

=== Team Tournament Highs ===
Points

Rank	Name	G	Pts	PPG
1	(Angola) Interclube	7	589	84.1
2	(Angola) 1º de Agosto	6	406	67.7
3	(Mozambique) Ferroviário de Maputo	6	405	67.5
4	(Nigeria) First Bank	7	467	66.7
5	(Democratic Republic of the Congo) Vita Club	4	236	59.0
6	(Kenya) Ports Authority	6	344	57.3
7	(Algeria) GS Pétroliers	7	371	53.0
8	(Democratic Republic of the Congo) Motema Pembe	6	301	50.2
9	(Kenya) Equity Bank	7	299	42.7

Rebounds

Rank	Name	G	Rbs	RPG
1	(Angola) Interclube	7	347	49.6
2	(Democratic Republic of the Congo) Motema Pembe	6	255	42.5
3	(Angola) 1º de Agosto	6	242	40.3
4	(Algeria) GS Pétroliers	7	281	40.1
5	(Democratic Republic of the Congo) Vita Club	4	159	39.8
6	(Kenya) Ports Authority	6	238	39.7
7	(Nigeria) First Bank	7	265	37.9
8	(Mozambique) Ferroviário de Maputo	6	212	35.3
9	(Kenya) Equity Bank	7	245	35.0

Assists

Rank	Name	G	Ast	APG
1	(Mozambique) Ferroviário de Maputo	6	100	17.2
2	(Angola) 1º de Agosto	6	97	16.2
3	(Angola) Interclube	7	91	15.7
4	(Algeria) GS Pétroliers	7	81	14.7
5	(Kenya) Ports Authority	6	50	14.2
6	(Democratic Republic of the Congo) Motema Pembe	6	67	13.8
6	(Democratic Republic of the Congo) Vita Club	4	58	11.8
8	(Nigeria) First Bank	7	57	11.7
9	(Kenya) Equity Bank	7	55	9.1

Steals

Rank	Name	G	Sts	SPG
1	(Mozambique) Ferroviário de Maputo	6	117	19.4
2	(Algeria) GS Pétroliers	7	100	14.3
3	(Angola) Interclube	7	93	13.3
4	(Democratic Republic of the Congo) Vita Club	4	49	12.3
5	(Kenya) Equity Bank	7	82	11.7
6	(Kenya) Ports Authority	6	68	11.3
7	(Democratic Republic of the Congo) Motema Pembe	6	61	10.2
8	(Nigeria) First Bank	7	69	9.9
9	(Angola) 1º de Agosto	6	58	9.7

Blocks

Rank	Name	G	Bks	BPG
1	(Angola) Interclube	7	21	3.0
2	(Angola) 1º de Agosto	6	17	2.8
3	(Nigeria) First Bank	7	14	2.0
4	(Democratic Republic of the Congo) Motema Pembe	6	10	1.7
5	(Algeria) GS Pétroliers	7	9	1.3
6	(Democratic Republic of the Congo) Vita Club	4	5	1.3
7	(Kenya) Ports Authority	6	7	1.2
8	(Mozambique) Ferroviário de Maputo	6	6	1.0
9	(Kenya) Equity Bank	7	4	0.6

Turnovers

Rank	Name	G	Tos	TPG
1	(Democratic Republic of the Congo) Motema Pembe	6	164	27.3
2	(Kenya) Equity Bank	7	173	24.7
3	(Algeria) GS Pétroliers	7	171	24.4
4	(Kenya) Ports Authority	6	136	22.7
5	(Democratic Republic of the Congo) Vita Club	4	88	22.0
6	(Angola) Interclube	7	129	18.4
7	(Angola) 1º de Agosto	6	107	17.8
8	(Mozambique) Ferroviário de Maputo	6	106	17.7
9	(Nigeria) First Bank	7	116	16.6

2-point field goal percentage

Pos	Name	A	M	%
1	(Angola) 1º de Agosto	226	119	52.7
2	(Mozambique) Ferroviário de Maputo	251	112	44.6
3	(Angola) Interclube	349	144	41.3
4	(Algeria) GS Pétroliers	295	120	40.7
5	(Kenya) Ports Authority	263	105	39.9
6	(Democratic Republic of the Congo) Vita Club	209	83	39.7
7	(Nigeria) First Bank	353	135	38.2
8	(Kenya) Equity Bank	278	96	34.5
9	(Democratic Republic of the Congo) Motema Pembe	315	106	33.7

3-point field goal percentage

Pos	Name	A	M	%
1	(Angola) Interclube	174	56	32.2
2	(Nigeria) First Bank	107	30	28.0
3	(Angola) 1º de Agosto	114	29	25.4
4	(Mozambique) Ferroviário de Maputo	140	33	23.6
5	(Kenya) Ports Authority	90	21	23.3
6	(Algeria) GS Pétroliers	106	24	22.6
7	(Democratic Republic of the Congo) Motema Pembe	77	11	14.3
8	(Kenya) Equity Bank	100	14	14.0
9	(Democratic Republic of the Congo) Vita Club	45	4	8.9

Free throw percentage

Pos	Name	A	M	%
1	(Nigeria) First Bank	148	107	72.3
2	(Angola) Interclube	188	133	70.7
3	(Angola) 1º de Agosto	124	81	65.3
4	(Mozambique) Ferroviário de Maputo	127	82	64.6
5	(Kenya) Ports Authority	114	71	62.3
6	(Mozambique) Vita Club	95	58	61.1
7	(Kenya) Equity Bank	120	65	54.2
8	(Democratic Republic of the Congo) Motema Pembe	109	56	51.4
9	(Algeria) GS Pétroliers	118	59	50.0

=== Team Game highs ===
Department	Name	Total	Opponent
Points	(Angola) Interclube	99	(Kenya) Equity Bank
Rebounds	(Democratic Republic of the Congo) Motema Pembe (Kenya) Equity Bank	54	(Mozambique) Ferroviário (Democratic Republic of the Congo) Vita Club
Assists	(Angola) Interclube	24	(Democratic Republic of the Congo) Motema Pembe
Steals	(Mozambique) Ferroviário (Kenya) Ports Authority	25	(Algeria) GS Pétroliers (Democratic Republic of the Congo) Motema Pembe
Blocks	(Angola) Interclube	6	(Democratic Republic of the Congo) Motema Pembe
2-point field goal percentage	(Angola) 1º de Agosto	66.7% (26/39)	(Kenya) Ports Authority
3-point field goal percentage	(Angola) Interclube	43.5% (10/23)	(Kenya) Equity Bank
Free throw percentage	(Angola) Interclube	91.7% (11/12)	(Democratic Republic of the Congo) Vita Club
Turnovers	(Kenya) Ports Authority	38	(Mozambique) Ferroviário

== All Tournament Team ==
G	(United States)	Dominique Wilson
G	(Angola)	Italee Lucas
F	(Mozambique)	Leia Dongue
F	(Argentina)	Gisela Vega
C	(United States)	Alicia DeVaughn

2017 FIBA Africa Women's Clubs Champions Cup winner

Clube Desportivo Primeiro de Agosto
3rd title

Team roster: Adalberta Candeias, Alicia DeVaughn, Ana Gonçalves, Avelina Peso, Elizabeth Mateus, Fineza Eusébio, Helena Viegas, Isabel Simba, Leia Dongue, Luísa Tomás, Rosa Gala, Sónia Ndoniema
Head coach: Jaime Covilhã

Most Valuable Player
(United States) Alicia DeVaughn

== See also ==
- 2017 FIBA Africa Championship for Women
