= Ferroviário de Maputo (women's basketball) =

- Nickname: Os Locomotivas (The Locomotives)
- Leagues: Mozambican League
- Founded: 1924
- Arena: Pavilhão do Maxaquene
- Capacity: 3,500
- Location: Maputo, Mozambique
- Team colors: Green and white
- Championships: 3 WBLA championships
- Website: fermaputo.co.mz
Home	Away	Third

Clube Ferroviário de Maputo is a women's basketball club based in Maputo, Mozambique. The team competes in the Mozambican League. Ferroviário is one of the most decorated teams on the continent, having won the Women's Basketball League Africa (WBLA) three times, in 2018, 2019 and 2024.

== History ==
Ferroviário de Maputo was founded in 1924 and is operated by the country's national railway organisation.

In 2018, Ferroviário won their maiden title, and their country's sixth title overall, by edging out the five-time champions Interclube of Angola, 59–56, in the finals. A year later, in 2019, Maputo won its second title after defeating record holder Interclube once again in the final, 91–90 after overtime. Ingvild Mucauro was named the competition's MVP.

On December 16, 2024, Ferroviário won their third continental title, after beating Al Ahly in the final in the Dakar Arena.

== Honours ==
Women's Basketball League Africa (WBLA) / FIBA Africa Women's Clubs Champions Cup

- (gold) Champions (3): 2018, 2019, 2024
  - (silver) Runners-up (3): 2006, 2016, 2017
    - (bronze) Third place (2): 2015, 2022
