= Cierra Dillard =

American professional basketball player (born 1996)

No. 24 – Sporting Alexandria
- Position: Guard
- League: Egyptian Basketball Premier League

Personal information
- Born: May 8, 1996 (age 30) Rochester, New York
- Listed height: 5 ft 9 in (1.75 m)

Career information
- High school: Gates Chili (Rochester, New York)
- College: UMass (2014–2016); Buffalo (2017–2019)
- WNBA draft: 2019: 2nd round, 20th overall pick
- Drafted by: Minnesota Lynx
- Playing career: 2019–present

Career history
- 2019–2020: Stadium Casablanca
- 2021–present: Sporting Alexandria

Career highlights
- 2× AWBL champion (2022, 2023); AWBL Most Valuable Player (2023); MAC Tournament MVP (2019); First-team All-MAC (2019)
- Stats at Basketball Reference

Cierra Janay Dillard (born May 8, 1996) is an American-Senegalese professional basketball player who currently plays for Alexandria Sporting Club.

== College career ==
Dillard attended Gates Chili High School in Rochester, New York. She was named the All-Greater Rochester Girls Basketball Player of the Decade 2010–19.

She later attended the University of Massachusetts Amherst for two years, before transferring to the University at Buffalo. At both universities, she played on the school's respective women's basketball teams. While playing at Buffalo, Dillard helped the Bulls to back-to-back NCAA Division I women's basketball tournament appearances in 2018 and 2019, including a Sweet Sixteen appearance in 2018.

== Professional career ==
Dillard was selected by the Minnesota Lynx in the second round of the 2019 WNBA draft. The Lynx waived her in May but shortly later she was claimed of waivers by the Los Angeles Sparks. After appearing in one preseason game for the Sparks, she was once again waived on May 18.

In 2022, Dillard guided Alexandria Sporting Club to the 2022 FIBA Africa Women's Champions Cup title, scoring a team-high 21 points in the finals. The following season, Sporting repeated as African champions and Dillard was named MVP of the 2023 Africa Women's Basketball League. Dillard averaged 23 points per game on 53.9% shooting from the field.

== Personal ==
In 2023, Dillard became Senegalese by presidential decree. She joined the Senegal national team shortly after.

== Career statistics ==
=== College ===
Legend
GP	Games played	GS	Games started	MPG	Minutes per game
FG%	Field goal percentage	3P%	3-point field goal percentage	FT%	Free throw percentage
RPG	Rebounds per game	APG	Assists per game	SPG	Steals per game
BPG	Blocks per game	PPG	Points per game	**Bold**	Career high

Year	Team	GP	Points	FG%	3P%	FT%	RPG	APG	SPG	BPG	PPG
2014–15	UMass	30	319	35.7%	32.4%	70.0%	3.1	2.5	1.5	0.1	10.6
2015–16	UMass	30	464	**41.8%**	32.9%	66.7%	3.3	2.7	2.0	0.0	15.5
2017–18	Buffalo	**35**	566	39.6%	**34.6%**	80.1%	4.1	5.2	**3.0**	0.1	16.2
2018–19	Buffalo	34	**856**	38.6%	34.1%	**81.2%**	**4.9**	**5.7**	2.9	**0.2**	**25.2**
Career		129	2205	39.1%	33.8%	76.2%	3.9	4.1	2.4	0.1	17.1
