= 2018 FIBA Africa Women's Champions Cup =

2018 FIBA Africa Champions Cup for Women
24th FIBA Africa Champions Cup for Women

Tournament details
- Host country: Mozambique
- Dates: 17–25 November
- Teams: 10 (from 53 federations)
- Venue: 1 (in 1 host city)

Final positions
- Champions: Mozambique (Ferroviário's 1st title; Mozambique's 6th title)

Tournament statistics
- MVP: (Angola) (United States) Italee Lucas
- Top scorer: (Uganda) Nansikombi (17.1)
- Top rebounds: (Democratic Republic of the Congo) Mfutila (10.2)
- Top assists: (Democratic Republic of the Congo) Bombolo (5.2)
- PPG (Team): (Nigeria) First Bank (79.9)
- RPG (Team): (Democratic Republic of the Congo) I.N.S.S. (46.0)
- APG (Team): (Mozambique) Ferroviário (16.9) (Nigeria) First Bank

Official website
- 2018 FIBA Africa Women's Champions Cup

The 2018 FIBA Africa Women's Champions Cup was the 24th edition of the FIBA Africa Basketball Club Championship for Women, the international basketball club tournament of FIBA Africa. The tournament was held in Maputo, Mozambique, from 17 to 25 November 2018.

Ferroviário de Maputo from the host country won their maiden title, and their country's sixth title overall, by edging out the five-time champions Interclube of Angola, 59-56, in the Finals.

== Draw ==
The draw for the tournament took place on 15 November in the Mozambican capital city of Maputo.

Group A	Group B
(Mozambique) Ferroviário de Maputo (Cameroon) FAP Yaoundé (Angola) Interclube (Kenya) Equity Bank (Democratic Republic of the Congo) Vita Club	(Nigeria) First Bank (Madagascar) MB2ALL (Zimbabwe) Lakers (Democratic Republic of the Congo) I.N.S.S. Kenya Ports Authority

== Preliminary round ==
All times are local (UTC+2).

=== Group A ===
Pos	Team	Pld	W	L	PF	PA	PD	Pts	Qualification
1	(Angola) Interclube	4	4	0	314	224	+90	8	Advance to quarterfinals
2	(Mozambique) Ferroviário de Maputo	4	3	1	284	214	+70	7	Advance to quarterfinals
3	(Democratic Republic of the Congo) Vita Club	4	1	3	227	290	−63	5 (Note: 1−1, 1.151 (beaten FAP Yaoundé, lost to Equity Bank))	Advance to quarterfinals
4	(Cameroon) FAP Yaoundé	4	1	3	234	259	−25	5 (Note: 1−1, 1.044 (beaten Equity Bank, lost to Vita Club))	Advance to quarterfinals
5	(Kenya) Equity Bank	4	1	3	222	294	−72	5 (Note: 1−1, 0.842 (beaten Vita Club, lost to FAP Yaoundé))	Advance to 9th-10th Classification

Source: FIBA Africa
Rules for classification: (1) Tournament points, (2) Head-to-head tournament points, (3) Head-to-head goal average, (4) Overall goal average, (5) Drawing of lots
Notes:

17 November 2018
15:45

Boxscore

FAP Yaoundé (Cameroon)	66–74	(Angola) Interclube
Scoring by quarter: 23–32, 11–12, 17–18, 15–12
Pts: Green 22; Rebs: Green 7 Asts: Green, Boyd 3		Pts: Jorge 21; Rebs: Lucas 9 Asts: Lucas 6

Pavilhão do Maxaquene, Maputo
Referees: Joyce Muchenu (ZIM), Aya Khaled Abdelmohsed Ahmed (EGY), Samuel Abiodun Shofoluwe (NGR)

17 November 2018
18:00

Boxscore

Ferroviário de Maputo (Mozambique)	68–45	(Kenya) Equity Bank
Scoring by quarter: 17–10, 12–10, 25–9, 14–16
Pts: Mucauro 16; Rebs: Mafanela 10; Asts: Zita, Macamo 4		Pts: Kananu 14; Rebs: B. Okoth 8 Asts: Indasi 3

Pavilhão do Maxaquene, Maputo
Referees: Ndeye Aissatou Diagne (SEN), Natascha Wiese (RSA), Andrianiaina Sandratra (MAD)

18 November 2018
13:30

Boxscore

Vita Club (Democratic Republic of the Congo)	39–89	(Angola) Interclube
Scoring by quarter: 13–15, 10–23, 8–28, 8–23
Pts: Ngobeleza 9 Rebs: Ndiba 7 Asts: Bombolo 3		Pts: Daniel 21; Rebs: Thompson 12; Asts: Fernandes 4

Pavilhão do Maxaquene, Maputo
Referees: Natascha Wiese (RSA), Arnold Hloniphizwe Moseya (RSA), Andrianiaina Sandratra (MAD)

18 November 2018
18:00

Boxscore

Ferroviário de Maputo (Mozambique)	71–49	(Cameroon) FAP Yaoundé
Scoring by quarter: 25–10, 11–12, 21–14, 14–13
Pts: Cossa 15; Rebs: Mafanela 12; Asts: Macamo 4		Pts: Mbong 17; Rebs: Green 6 Asts: Green 3

Pavilhão do Maxaquene, Maputo
Referees: Joyce Muchenu (ZIM), Sara Gamal Elsharnouby (EGY), Mbayi Christian Ntela (COD)

19 November 2018
13:30

Boxscore

Equity Bank (Kenya)	44–77	(Cameroon) FAP Yaoundé
Scoring by quarter: 13–13, 11–30, 8–17, 12–17

Pavilhão do Maxaquene, Maputo
Referees: Mbayi Christian Ntela (COD), Samuel Abiodun Shofoluwe (NGR), Joyce Muchenu (ZIM)

19 November 2018
18:00

Boxscore

Vita Club (Democratic Republic of the Congo)	43–75	(Mozambique) Ferroviário de Maputo
Scoring by quarter: 10–25, 6–15, 21–15, 6–20
Pts: Kabobo 11; Rebs: Muadi 8 Asts: Kabobo 3		Pts: Lhavanguane 13; Rebs: Robertson-Warren 8 Asts: Macamo 5

Pavilhão do Maxaquene, Maputo
Referees: Aya Khaled Abdelmohsed Ahmed (EGY), Ndeye Aissatou Diagne (SEN), Dorothy Judy Okatch (BOT)

20 November 2018
15:45

Boxscore

Equity Bank (Kenya)	84–75	(Democratic Republic of the Congo) Vita Club
Scoring by quarter: 21–19, 21–15, 20–17, 22–24
Pts: B. Okoth 23; Rebs: Kananu 10; Asts: Betty Mjomba 5		Pts: Kabobo 20; Rebs: Ngobeleza 7 Asts: Bombolo 6

Pavilhão do Maxaquene, Maputo
Referees: Natascha Wiese (RSA), Sara Gamal Elsharnouby (EGY), Andrianiaina Sandratra (MAD)

20 November 2018
18:00

Boxscore

Interclube (Angola)	77–70	(Mozambique) Ferroviário de Maputo
Scoring by quarter: 16–16, 29–11, 13–16, 19–27
Pts: Lucas 33; Rebs: Manuel 13; Asts: Lucas 5		Pts: Mafanela 15; Rebs: Mafanela 9 Asts: Cossa 6

Pavilhão do Maxaquene, Maputo
Referees: Joyce Muchenu (ZIM), Guy Sani Kollo (CMR), Dorothy Judy Okatch (BOT)

21 November 2018
13:30

Boxscore

Interclube (Angola)	74–49	(Kenya) Equity Bank
Scoring by quarter: 23–4, 21–11, 17–22, 13–12

Pavilhão do Maxaquene, Maputo
Referees: Natascha Wiese (RSA), Mbayi Christian Ntela (COD), Tonton Banza Kalume (COD)

21 November 2018
15:45

Boxscore

FAP Yaoundé (Cameroon)	42–70	(Democratic Republic of the Congo) Vita Club
Scoring by quarter: 5–26, 7–6, 21–13, 9–25
Pts: Mbong 11; Rebs: Boyd 8 Asts: Green, Lonteu, Boyd 3		Pts: Ngobeleza, Ndiba 17; Rebs: Kabobo 11; Asts: Bombolo 7

Pavilhão do Maxaquene, Maputo
Referees: Sara Gamal Elsharnouby (EGY), Dorothy Judy Okatch (BOT), Samuel Abiodun Shofoluwe (NGR)

=== Group B ===
Pos	Team	Pld	W	L	PF	PA	PD	Pts	Qualification
1	(Nigeria) First Bank	4	4	0	338	212	+126	8	Advance to quarterfinals
2	(Democratic Republic of the Congo) I.N.S.S.	4	3	1	267	251	+16	7	Advance to quarterfinals
3	Kenya Ports Authority	4	2	2	285	289	−4	6	Advance to quarterfinals
4	(Madagascar) MB2ALL	4	1	3	214	266	−52	5	Advance to quarterfinals
5	(Zimbabwe) Lakers	4	0	4	218	304	−86	4	Advance to 9th-10th Classification

Source: FIBA Africa
Rules for classification: (1) Tournament points, (2) Head-to-head tournament points, (3) Head-to-head goal average, (4) Overall goal average, (5) Drawing of lots

17 November 2018
11:15

Boxscore

Kenya Ports Authority	80–58	(Zimbabwe) Lakers
Scoring by quarter: 24–12, 18–17, 22–13, 16–16
Pts: Nansikombi 26; Rebs: Oluoch 8 Asts: Nansikombi 3		Pts: Majonga, Ngandini 15; Rebs: Penduka 7 Asts: Majonga 5

Pavilhão do Maxaquene, Maputo
Referees: Artur Cesar Bandeira de Castro (MOZ), Dorothy Judy Okatch (BOT), Guy Sani Kollo (CMR)

17 November 2018
13:30

Boxscore

First Bank (Nigeria)	74–40	(Madagascar) MB2ALL
Scoring by quarter: 13–9, 21–14, 17–4, 23–13
Pts: Nwajei 17; Rebs: Akaraiwe, Mfutila 7 Asts: Okoro 3		Pts: Romina 9 Rebs: Mamihajarison 8 Asts: 7 players 1

Pavilhão do Maxaquene, Maputo
Referees: Clesio Francisco Ramos (ANG), Sara Gamal Elsharnouby (EGY), Arnold Hloniphizwe Moseya (RSA)

18 November 2018
11:15

Boxscore

I.N.S.S. (Democratic Republic of the Congo)	71–51	(Madagascar) MB2ALL
Scoring by quarter: 21–13, 20–10, 13–14, 17–14
Pts: Kifuabala 17; Rebs: Ngusu 13; Asts: Mukoso 5		Pts: Andriamihajanirina 13; Rebs: Mamihajarison 11; Asts: Hajanirina, Ravelonjanahary 3

Pavilhão do Maxaquene, Maputo
Referees: Erick Omondi Otieno (KEN), Aya Khaled Abdelmohsed Ahmed (EGY), Samuel Abiodun Shofoluwe (NGR)

18 November 2018
15:45

Boxscore

Kenya Ports Authority	71–95	(Nigeria) First Bank
Scoring by quarter: 4–35, 25–16, 16–19, 26–25
Pts: Nansikombi 27; Rebs: Oluoch 8 Asts: Irankunda 7		Pts: Mfutila 21; Rebs: Mfutila 13; Asts: Akaraiwe 5

Pavilhão do Maxaquene, Maputo
Referees: Guy Sani Kollo (CMR), Ndeye Aissatou Diagne (SEN), Dorothy Judy Okatch (BOT)

19 November 2018
11:15

Boxscore

Lakers (Zimbabwe)	56–86	(Nigeria) First Bank
Scoring by quarter: 8–27, 16–22, 20–11, 12–26
Pts: Majonga 14; Rebs: Marondera 8 Asts: Majonga 4		Pts: Nwajei 20; Rebs: Mfutila 12; Asts: Akashili 5

Pavilhão do Maxaquene, Maputo

19 November 2018
15:45

Boxscore

I.N.S.S. (Democratic Republic of the Congo)	71–61	Kenya Ports Authority
Scoring by quarter: 22–20, 19–13, 13–12, 17–16
Pts: Lubata 19; Rebs: Kifuabala, Ngusu 9 Asts: Mbelu, Kokolo 4		Pts: Nansikombi 25; Rebs: Oluoch 8 Asts: Nansikombi 3

Pavilhão do Maxaquene, Maputo

20 November 2018
11:15

Boxscore

Lakers (Zimbabwe)	56–80	(Democratic Republic of the Congo) I.N.S.S.
Scoring by quarter: 11–31, 12–12, 23–19, 10–18
Pts: Marondera 20; Rebs: Marondera 7 Asts: Majonga 5		Pts: Mukoso 14; Rebs: Ngusu 12; Asts: Mayinga, Mbelu, Kokolo 2

Pavilhão do Maxaquene, Maputo
Referees: Aya Khaled Abdelmohsed Ahmed (EGY), Arnold Hloniphizwe Moseya (RSA), Erick Omondi Otieno (KEN)

20 November 2018
13:30

Boxscore

MB2ALL (Madagascar)	65–73	Kenya Ports Authority
Scoring by quarter: 16–20, 12–12, 16–23, 21–18
Pts: Raharimalala 12; Rebs: Mamihajarison 8 Asts: Mampionona 3		Pts: Nansikombi 18; Rebs: Oluoch 11; Asts: Irankunda, Nansikombi 3

Pavilhão do Maxaquene, Maputo
Referees: Ndeye Aissatou Diagne (SEN), Clesio Francisco Ramos (ANG), Samuel Abiodun Shofoluwe (NGR)

21 November 2018
11:15

Boxscore

MB2ALL (Madagascar)	58–48	(Zimbabwe) Lakers
Scoring by quarter: 11–13, 15–8, 13–11, 19–18

Pavilhão do Maxaquene, Maputo
Referees: Guy Sani Kollo (CMR), Erick Omondi Otieno (KEN), Artur Cesar Bandeira de Castro (MOZ)

21 November 2018
18:30

Boxscore

First Bank (Nigeria)	83–45	(Democratic Republic of the Congo) I.N.S.S.
Scoring by quarter: 27–8, 13–9, 24–13, 19–15
Pts: Mfutila 15; Rebs: Mfutila 15; Asts: Mfutila 4		Pts: Lubata 9 Rebs: Kokolo, Sikuzani 8 Asts: Kokolo 4

Pavilhão do Maxaquene, Maputo
Referees: Ndeye Aissatou Diagne (SEN), Clesio Francisco Ramos (ANG), Aya Khaled Abdelmohsed Ahmed (EGY)

== Final round ==
=== 9th-10th Classification ===
23 November 2018
09:00

Boxscore

Equity Bank (Kenya)	65–54	(Zimbabwe) Lakers
Scoring by quarter: 15–18, 20–9, 10–15, 20–12

Pavilhão do Maxaquene, Maputo
Referees: Mbayi Christian Ntela (COD), Arnold Hloniphizwe Moseya (RSA), Andrianiaina Sandratra (MAD)

=== RD3 ===
5th place game
B2	(Democratic Republic of the Congo) I.N.S.S.	45
A4	(Cameroon) FAP Yaoundé	60
7th place game
B4	(Madagascar) MB2ALL	49
B3	Kenya Ports Authority	52

5th–8th place semifinals
B4	(Madagascar) MB2ALL	65
B2	(Democratic Republic of the Congo) I.N.S.S.	75
A4	(Cameroon) FAP Yaoundé	69
B3	Kenya Ports Authority	55

Quarterfinals
B4	(Madagascar) MB2ALL	46
A1	(Angola) Interclube	84
B2	(Democratic Republic of the Congo) I.N.S.S.	43
A3	(Democratic Republic of the Congo) Vita Club	78
A4	(Cameroon) FAP Yaoundé	66
B1	(Nigeria) First Bank	69
A2	(Mozambique) Ferroviário de Maputo	73
B3	Kenya Ports Authority	40

Semifinals
A1	(Angola) Interclube	76
A3	(Democratic Republic of the Congo) Vita Club	56
B1	(Nigeria) First Bank	59
A2	(Mozambique) Ferroviário de Maputo	72

Final
A1	(Angola) Interclube	56
A2	(Mozambique) Ferroviário de Maputo	59
Bronze medal game
A3	(Democratic Republic of the Congo) Vita Club	69
B1	(Nigeria) First Bank	93

23 November 2018
11:15

Boxscore

MB2ALL (Madagascar)	46–84	(Angola) Interclube
Scoring by quarter: 7–20, 10–19, 14–28, 15–17
Pts: Andriamihajanirina 9 Rebs: Andriamihajanirina 7 Asts: Mampionona 3		Pts: Daniel 22; Rebs: Thompson 8 Asts: Lucas 5

Pavilhão do Maxaquene, Maputo
Referees: Natascha Wiese (RSA), Samuel Abiodun Shofoluwe (NGR), Erick Omondi Otieno (KEN)

23 November 2018
13:30

Boxscore

Vita Club (Democratic Republic of the Congo)	78–43	(Democratic Republic of the Congo) I.N.S.S.
Scoring by quarter: 21–11, 10–10, 23–8, 24–14
Pts: Ndiba 21; Rebs: Ndiba 17; Asts: Bombolo 5		Pts: Mukoso 15; Rebs: Ngusu 11; Asts: Mbelu 2

Pavilhão do Maxaquene, Maputo
Referees: Aya Khaled Abdelmohsed Ahmed (EGY), Sara Gamal Elsharnouby (EGY), Dorothy Judy Okatch (BOT)

23 November 2018
15:45

Boxscore

FAP Yaoundé (Cameroon)	66–69	(Nigeria) First Bank
Scoring by quarter: 15–16, 17–16, 15–20, 19–17
Pts: Meyeni 16; Rebs: Lonteu 8 Asts: Lonteu 4		Pts: Mohammed 23; Rebs: Akaraiwe, Mfutila 8 Asts: Nwajei 9

Pavilhão do Maxaquene, Maputo
Referees: Artur Cesar Bandeira de Castro (MOZ), Joyce Muchenu (ZIM), Ndeye Aissatou Diagne (SEN)

23 November 2018
18:00

Boxscore

Kenya Ports Authority	40–73	(Mozambique) Ferroviário de Maputo
Scoring by quarter: 2–17, 9–21, 22–20, 7–15
Pts: Nansikombi, Nyongesa, Oluoch 8 Rebs: Nansikombi 7 Asts: Nansikombi 4		Pts: Cossa 15; Rebs: Robertson-Warren 8 Asts: Tyson-Thomas, Macamo, Henriques 3

Pavilhão do Maxaquene, Maputo
Referees: Tonton Banza Kalume (COD), Guy Sani Kollo (CMR), Clesio Francisco Ramos (ANG)

=== 5th-8th Classification ===
24 November 2018
11:15

Boxscore

MB2ALL (Madagascar)	65–75	(Democratic Republic of the Congo) I.N.S.S.
Scoring by quarter: 16–12, 18–12, 14–23, 17–28
Pts: Andriamihajanirina 15; Rebs: Rasoafinaritra 6 Asts: Hajanirina, Ravelonjanahary 4		Pts: Kifuabala 19; Rebs: Kifuabala 6 Asts: Mukoso 4

Pavilhão do Maxaquene, Maputo
Referees: Dorothy Judy Okatch (BOT), Erick Omondi Otieno (KEN), Arnold Hloniphizwe Moseya (RSA)

24 November 2018
13:30

Boxscore

FAP Yaoundé (Cameroon)	69–55	Kenya Ports Authority
Scoring by quarter: 23–9, 8–12, 25–16, 13–18
Pts: Green 24; Rebs: Mbong, Boyd 8 Asts: Green 5		Pts: Nansikombi 13; Rebs: L. Atieno 5 Asts: Nansikombi, A. Atieno 3

Pavilhão do Maxaquene, Maputo
Referees: Artur Cesar Bandeira de Castro (MOZ), Natascha Wiese (RSA), Clesio Francisco Ramos (ANG)

=== Semifinals ===
24 November 2018
15:45

Boxscore

Interclube (Angola)	76–56	(Democratic Republic of the Congo) Vita Club
Scoring by quarter: 27–9, 21–11, 17–15, 11–21

Pavilhão do Maxaquene, Maputo
Referees: Ndeye Aissatou Diagne (SEN), Guy Sani Kollo (CMR), Aya Khaled Abdelmohsed Ahmed (EGY)

24 November 2018
18:00

Boxscore

First Bank (Nigeria)	59–72	(Mozambique) Ferroviário de Maputo
Scoring by quarter: 13–13, 16–20, 19–15, 11–24
Pts: Nwajei 24; Rebs: Mfutila 8 Asts: Mfutila 3		Pts: Mucauro, Tyson-Thomas 16; Rebs: Gimo 7 Asts: Macamo 6

Pavilhão do Maxaquene, Maputo
Referees: Tonton Banza Kalume (COD), Joyce Muchenu (ZIM), Sara Gamal Elsharnouby (EGY)

=== 7th Place ===
25 November 2018
11:15

Boxscore

MB2ALL (Madagascar)	49–52	Kenya Ports Authority
Scoring by quarter: 12–6, 7–18, 20–15, 10–13
Pts: Andriamihajanirina 17; Rebs: Mamihajarison, Romina 10; Asts: Hajanirina, Andriamihajanirina 3		Pts: Oluoch 14; Rebs: Nyongesa 10; Asts: Nyongesa 4

Pavilhão do Maxaquene, Maputo
Referees: Artur Cesar Bandeira de Castro (MOZ), Arnold Hloniphizwe Moseya (RSA), Mbayi Christian Ntela (COD)

=== 5th Place ===
25 November 2018
13:30

Boxscore

I.N.S.S. (Democratic Republic of the Congo)	45–60	(Cameroon) FAP Yaoundé
Scoring by quarter: 6–20, 13–12, 13–13, 13–15
Pts: Lubata 13; Rebs: Ngusu 9 Asts: Kokolo 2		Pts: Mbong 16; Rebs: Mbong 10; Asts: Meyeni 6

Pavilhão do Maxaquene, Maputo
Referees: Dorothy Judy Okatch (BOT), Samuel Abiodun Shofoluwe (NGR), Natascha Wiese (RSA)

=== 3rd Place ===
25 November 2018
15:45

Boxscore

Vita Club (Democratic Republic of the Congo)	69–93	(Nigeria) First Bank
Scoring by quarter: 21–14, 9–27, 22–23, 17–29
Pts: Kabobo 17; Rebs: Ndiba 12; Asts: Bombolo 8		Pts: Nwajei 23; Rebs: Mfutila 11; Asts: Nwajei 4

Pavilhão do Maxaquene, Maputo
Referees: Aya Khaled Abdelmohsed Ahmed (EGY), Joyce Muchenu (ZIM), Guy Sani Kollo (CMR)

=== Final ===
25 November 2018
18:00

Boxscore

Interclube (Angola)	56–59	(Mozambique) Ferroviário de Maputo
Scoring by quarter: 11–16, 22–14, 11–17, 12–12
Pts: Lucas 17; Rebs: Manuel 10; Asts: Lucas 3		Pts: Tyson-Thomas 20; Rebs: Robertson-Warren 12; Asts: Macamo 5

Pavilhão do Maxaquene, Maputo
Referees: Tonton Banza Kalume (COD), Sara Gamal Elsharnouby (EGY), Ndeye Aissatou Diagne (SEN)

== Final ranking ==
Rank	Team	Record
1st place, gold medalist(s)	(Mozambique) Ferroviário de Maputo	6–1
2nd place, silver medalist(s)	(Angola) Interclube	6–1
3rd place, bronze medalist(s)	(Nigeria) First Bank	6–1
4th	(Democratic Republic of the Congo) Vita Club	2–5
5th	(Cameroon) FAP Yaoundé	3–4
6th	(Democratic Republic of the Congo) I.N.S.S.	4–3
7th	Kenya Ports Authority	3–4
8th	(Madagascar) MB2ALL	1–6
9th	(Kenya) Equity Bank	2–3
10th	(Zimbabwe) Lakers	0–5

== Awards ==
2018 FIBA Africa Women's Champions Cup

Ferroviário de Maputo
1st title

Most Valuable Player
(Angola) (United States) Italee Lucas

=== All-Star Five ===
The following players were named to the All-Star Five line-up.

Pos	Player	Club
F	(Nigeria) Aisha Mohammed	(Nigeria) First Bank
F	(Democratic Republic of the Congo) Ginette Mfutila	(Nigeria) First Bank
G	(Angola) (United States) Italee Lucas (MVP)	(Angola) Interclube
G	(Mozambique) Anabela Cossa	(Mozambique) Ferroviário de Maputo
G	(Uganda) Jamila Nansikombi	Kenya Ports Authority
