= Madina Okot =

Kenyan basketball player

No. 11 – Atlanta Dream
- Position: Center
- League: WNBA

Personal information
- Born: August 23, 2004 (age 22)
- Listed height: 6 ft 6 in (1.98 m)

Career information
- College: Mississippi State (2024–2025); South Carolina (2025–2026)
- WNBA draft: 2026: 1st round, 13th overall pick
- Drafted by: Atlanta Dream
- Playing career: 2022–present

Career history
- 2022–2023: KPA
- 2026–present: Atlanta Dream

Career highlights
- AWBL All-Star (2023); Nike Hoop Summit (2023); Second Team All-SEC (2026)
- Stats at Basketball Reference

Madina Okot Mullah (born August 23, 2004) is a Kenyan professional basketball player for the Atlanta Dream of the Women's National Basketball Association (WNBA). She played college basketball for the Mississippi State Bulldogs and the South Carolina Gamecocks. Okot has represented Kenya internationally on the country's 3x3 and 5-aside teams. In 2022, Okot was named the Most Promising Girl at the Kenyan Sports Personality of the Year Awards.

== Biography ==
Okot is from Mumias, Kenya. Okot first played volleyball at Bishop Sulumeti High School. In 2020, Okot first started playing basketball, after transferring to Kaya Tiwi High School. At the time, she had no knowledge of the sport. Standing 6'6' or '78 inches (200 cm), she soon distinguished herself on the court. At age 17, Okot was named to the Kenyan national basketball team where she competed for Kenya's FIBA 3x3 U23 team.

=== Visa issues ===
In 2022, Okot's appearance playing for the 3x3 team in the 2022 Commonwealth Games caught the attention of Eastern Michigan University scouts, but visa issues prevented her from attending university in the United States. Okot remained in Kenya and played university basketball for Zetech University in Kenya for two seasons while her visa issues were worked out. That year, Okot signed for the Kenya Ports Authority team. That season, they claimed the Kenya Basketball Federation league title.

In 2023, Okot continued to play for Zetech and led the Kenya Ports Authority team to second place in the FIBA Africa Women's Basketball League and was named the Team of the Tournament. That year she was the only African player to make the World Select Women's Team roster at the Nike Hoop Summit. Also in 2023, Okot was named to the Kenya Lionesses 5-aside national team, where she played in the FIBA Women's AfroBasket qualifiers. In a pre-qualifier to the Paris Olympics, Okot was named Most Valuable Player at the 3x3 Africa Cup competition, and won the Africa Cup.

=== Mississippi State ===
Her junior year, Okot successfully transferred to Mississippi State in the United States. Her United States visa had been turned down four times before she was successful. Head coach Sam Purcell described Okot as "the definition of a diamond in the rough". At Mississippi State, Okot immediately distinguished herself as a standout player. In her first game she earned 14 points and 17 rebounds. She would start every game her junior season, averaging 11.2 points and 9.6 rebounds per game. The team's top player, she blocked 38 shots and forced 46 turnovers. That year, Okot led Mississippi State to the second round of the NCAA tournament. Okot's season included 12 double-doubles, and a season best 21-point, 23-rebound game against Vanderbilt. In April, Okot announced she was entering the transfer portal, which was cited as a major loss to Mississippi State.

=== University of South Carolina ===
In between her junior and senior years, Okot announced she had transferred to South Carolina to play for Dawn Staley. Her move to South Carolina was widely reported. In transferring, Okot cited her admiration for Staley, South Carolina's coach, and for the opportunity for Carolina's program to produce top players for the WNBA.

== Professional career ==
On April 13, 2026, the Atlanta Dream selected Okot as the thirteenth overall pick of the 2026 WNBA draft.

== Career statistics ==
Legend
GP	Games played	GS	Games started	MPG	Minutes per game	FG%	Field goal percentage
3P%	3-point field goal percentage	FT%	Free throw percentage	RPG	Rebounds per game	APG	Assists per game
SPG	Steals per game	BPG	Blocks per game	TO	Turnovers per game	PPG	Points per game

=== WNBA ===
==== Regular season ====
WNBA regular season statistics
Year	Team	GP	GS	MPG	FG%	3P%	FT%	RPG	APG	SPG	BPG	TO	PPG
2026	Atlanta	42	2	9.1	.580	.111	.768	3.3	.3	.3	.3	1.2	5.4
Career	1 year, 1 team	42	2	9.1	.580	.111	.768	3.3	.3	.3	.3	1.2	5.4

=== College ===
Year	Team	GP	GS	MPG	FG%	3P%	FT%	RPG	APG	SPG	BPG	TO	PPG
2024–25	Mississippi State	34	34	22.6	64.9	--	62.5	9.6	0.7	1.4	1.1	2.5	11.3
2025–26	South Carolina	39	36	23.3	57.5	44.8	70.2	10.6	1.0	1.3	1.4	2.1	12.8
Career		73	70	23.0	60.6	44.8	61.6	10.1	0.9	1.3	1.3	2.3	12.1
Statistics retrieved from Sports-Reference.
