= 2009 FIBA Africa Women's Clubs Champions Cup =

2009 FIBA Africa Champions Cup for Women
15th FIBA Africa Champions Cup for Women

Tournament details
- Host country: Benin
- Dates: 13-22 November
- Teams: 10
- Venue(s): 1 (in 1 host city)

Final positions
- Champions: Nigeria (First Bank's 2nd title; Nigeria's 2nd th title)

Tournament statistics
- MVP: (United States) Danielle Green
- Top scorer: (Ivory Coast) Kouyaté 20.8
- Top rebounds: (Democratic Republic of the Congo) Kalanga 9.8
- Top assists: (Ivory Coast) Diomande 3.6
- PPG (Team): (Nigeria) First Bank 85.4
- RPG (Team): (Ivory Coast) Abidjan BC 39
- APG (Team): (Uganda) KCC Leopards 17

Official website
- 2009 FIBA Africa CC for Women

The 2009 FIBA Africa Women's Clubs Champions Cup (15th edition), was an international basketball tournament held in Cotonou, Benin, from 13 to 22 November 2009. The tournament, organized by FIBA Africa and hosted by Energie, was contested by 10 clubs split into 2 groups, the first four of which qualifying for the knock-out stage.

The tournament was won by First Bank from Nigeria.

== Draw ==
Group A	Group B
(Mozambique) A Politécnica (Ivory Coast) Abidjan Basket Club (Benin) Energie (Nigeria) First Bank; Kenya Ports Authority	(Egypt) Alexandria SC (Ivory Coast) Club Sportif d'Abidjan (Mozambique) Desportivo de Maputo (Nigeria) First Deepwater (Angola) Interclube

== Preliminary rounds ==
Times given below are in UTC+1.

=== Group A ===
Qualified for the quarter-finals

	Group A	M	W	L	PF	PA	Diff	P
1.	(Nigeria) First Bank	4	4	0	303	206	+97	8
2.	(Ivory Coast) Abidjan Basket Club	4	3	1	252	177	+75	7
3.	(Mozambique) Politécnica	4	2	2	212	214	-2	6
4.	Kenya Ports Authority	4	1	3	186	233	-47	5
5.	(Benin) Energie	4	0	4	183	306	-123	4

13 November 2009

Abidjan BC (Ivory Coast)	54–35	(Mozambique) Politécnica

Palais des Sports, Cotonou

Energie (Benin)	32–70	(Kenya) KPA

Palais des Sports, Cotonou

14 November 2009

Abidjan BC (Ivory Coast)	79–45	(Benin) Energie

Palais des Sports, Cotonou

First Bank (Nigeria)	74–54	(Mozambique) Politécnica

Palais des Sports, Cotonou

15 November 2009

First Bank (Nigeria)	57–56	(Ivory Coast) Abidjan BC

Palais des Sports, Cotonou

Politécnica (Mozambique)	54–47	(Kenya) KPA

Palais des Sports, Cotonou

17 November 2009
16:00

KPA (Kenya)	40–63	(Ivory Coast) Abidjan BC

Palais des Sports, Cotonou

18:00

First Bank (Nigeria)	88–67	(Benin) Energie

Palais des Sports, Cotonou

18 November 2009
14:00

KPA (Kenya)	29–84	(Nigeria) First Bank

Palais des Sports, Cotonou

Energie (Benin)	39–69	(Mozambique) Politécnica

Palais des Sports, Cotonou

=== Group B ===
Qualified for the quarter-finals

	Group B	M	W	L	PF	PA	Diff	P
1.	(Mozambique) Desportivo de Maputo	4	3	1	266	238	+28	7
2.	(Angola) Interclube	4	3	1	262	195	+67	7
3.	(Ivory Coast) Club Sportif d'Abidjan	4	2	2	215	202	+13	6
4.	(Nigeria) First Deepwater	4	1	3	246	273	-27	5
5.	(Egypt) Alexandria Sporting Club	4	1	3	224	305	-81	4

13 November 2009

CS d'Abidjan (Ivory Coast)	38–45	(Angola) Interclube

Palais des Sports, Cotonou

Desp Maputo (Mozambique)	71–72	(Egypt) Alexandria SC

Palais des Sports, Cotonou

14 November 2009

Interclube (Angola)	83–58	(Nigeria) F. Deepwater

Palais des Sports, Cotonou

Alexandria SC (Egypt)	48–69	(Ivory Coast) CS d'Abidjan

Palais des Sports, Cotonou

15 November 2009

Desp Maputo (Mozambique)	72–52	(Nigeria) F. Deepwater

Palais des Sports, Cotonou

Interclube (Angola)	77–37	(Egypt) Alexandria SC

Palais des Sports, Cotonou

17 November 2009
14:00

CS d'Abidjan (Ivory Coast)	57–61	(Mozambique) Desp Maputo

Palais des Sports, Cotonou

20:00

F. Deepwater (Nigeria)	88–67	(Egypt) Alexandria SC

Palais des Sports, Cotonou

18 November 2009
18:00

Interclube (Angola)	57–62	(Mozambique) Desp Maputo

Palais des Sports, Cotonou

20:00

CS d'Abidjan (Ivory Coast)	51–48	(Nigeria) F. Deepwater

Palais des Sports, Cotonou

== Knockout stage ==
Quarter-finals
20 November - 14:00
(Nigeria) First Bank	88
(Nigeria) F. Deepwater	48
20 November - 16:00
(Angola) Interclube	62
(Mozambique) Politécnica	58
20 November - 18:00
(Kenya) KPA	51
(Angola) Desp Maputo	66
20 November - 20:00
(Ivory Coast) CS d'Abidjan	54
(Ivory Coast) Abidjan BC	64

5th-8th Place
21 November
(Nigeria) F. Deepwater	51
(Mozambique) Politécnica	54
21 November
(Kenya) KPA	43
(Ivory Coast) CS d'Abidjan	48

5th place
22 November
(Mozambique) Politécnica	65
(Ivory Coast) CS d'Abidjan	49
7th place
22 November
(Nigeria) F. Deepwater	65
(Kenya) KPA	50

Quarter-finals
20 November - 14:00
(Nigeria) First Bank	88
(Nigeria) F. Deepwater	48
20 November - 16:00
(Angola) Interclube	62
(Mozambique) Politécnica	58
20 November - 18:00
(Kenya) KPA	51
(Angola) Desp Maputo	66
20 November - 20:00
(Ivory Coast) CS d'Abidjan	54
(Ivory Coast) Abidjan BC	64

Semi-finals
21 November
(Nigeria) First Bank	69
(Angola) Interclube	65
21 November
(Mozambique) Desp Maputo	49
(Ivory Coast) Abidjan BC	60

Final
22 November
(Nigeria) First Bank	64
(Ivory Coast) Abidjan BC	55
Third place
22 November
(Angola) Interclube	50
(Mozambique) Desp Maputo	57

=== 9th place ===
20 November 2009

Energie (Benin)	63–87	(Egypt) Alexandria SC
Scoring by quarter: 16-17, 8-26, 13-22, 26-22
Pts: Abil 21		Pts: Adjai 25

Palais des Sports, Cotonou

=== Quarter finals ===
20 November 2009
14:00

First Bank (Nigeria)	88–48	(Nigeria) F. Deepwater
Scoring by quarter: 26-12, 14-11, 26-7, 22-18
Pts: Green 19		Pts: Uchendu 11

Palais des Sports, Cotonou

16:00

Interclube (Angola)	62–58	(Mozambique) Politécnica
Scoring by quarter: 14-14, 21-12, 17-10, 19-13
Pts: Ilda 16		Pts: Azinheira 20

Palais des Sports, Cotonou

18:00

KPA (Kenya)	51–66	(Mozambique) Desp Maputo
Scoring by quarter: 12-13, 17-15, 9-12, 13-23
Pts: n/a		Pts: Valerdina 19

Palais des Sports, Cotonou

20:00

CS d'Abidjan (Ivory Coast)	54–64	(Ivory Coast) Abidjan BC
Scoring by quarter: 8-14, 18-16, 16-17, 12-17
Pts: Kouyaté 19		Pts: Kalanga 19

Palais des Sports, Cotonou

=== 5th-8th place ===
21 November 2009
14:00

Politécnica (Mozambique)	54–51	(Nigeria) F. Deepwater

Palais des Sports, Cotonou

16:00

KPA (Kenya)	43–48	(Ivory Coast) CS d'Abidjan
Scoring by quarter: 12-8, 3-17, 9-10, 19-13

Palais des Sports, Cotonou

=== Semifinals ===
21 November 2009
18:00

First Bank (Nigeria)	69–65 (OT)	(Angola) Interclube
Scoring by quarter: 21-15, 17-20, 8-10, 14-15, Overtime: 9-5
Pts: Green 17		Pts: Ilda 16

Palais des Sports, Cotonou

20:00

Abidjan BC (Ivory Coast)	60–49	(Mozambique) Desp Maputo
Scoring by quarter: 17-16, 9-16, 14-15, 20-2
Pts: Camara 15		Pts: n/a

Palais des Sports, Cotonou

=== 7th place ===
22 November 2009
10:00

F. Deepwater (Nigeria)	65–50	(Kenya) KPA
Scoring by quarter: 11-19, 10-12, 22-10, 22-9
Pts: Akashili 14		Pts: n/a

Palais des Sports, Cotonou

=== 5th place ===
22 November 2009
12:00

Politécnica (Mozambique)	65–49	(Ivory Coast) CS d'Abidjan
Scoring by quarter: 14-12, 17-13, 19-12, 15-12
Pts: Azinheira 17		Pts: Kouyaté 23

Palais des Sports, Cotonou

=== Bronze medal game ===
22 November 2009
17:00

Desp Maputo (Mozambique)	57–50	(Angola) Interclube
Scoring by quarter: 8-12, 13-11, 14-17, 22-10
Pts: Valerdina 15		Pts: Nguendula 15

Palais des Sports, Cotonou

=== Gold medal game ===
22 November 2009
19:00

First Bank (Nigeria)	64–55	(Ivory Coast) Abidjan BC
Scoring by quarter: 15-13, 15-9, 19-17, 15-16
Pts: Silva 17		Pts: Camara 23

Palais des Sports, Cotonou

== Final standings ==
Rank	Team	Record
Gold medal	(Nigeria) First Bank	7–0
Silver medal	(Ivory Coast) Abidjan Basket Club	5–2
Bronze medal	(Ivory Coast) Desportivo de Maputo	5–2
4.	(Angola) Interclube	4–3
5.	(Mozambique) A Politécnica	4–3
6.	(Ivory Coast) Club Sportif d'Abidjan	3–4
7.	(Nigeria) First Deepwater	2–5
8.	Kenya Ports Authority	1–6
9.	(Egypt) Alexandria SC	2–3
10.	(Benin) Energie	0–5

First Bank roster
Adeola Olanrewaju, Brisa Silva, Chioma Udeaja, Danielle Green, Funmilayo Ojelabi, Mfon Udoka, Rashidat Sadiq, Coach: Adewunmi Aderemi

== All Tournament Team ==
G	(United States)	Danielle Green
F	(Ivory Coast)	Kani Kouyaté
F	(Mozambique)	Ana Azinheira
C	(Nigeria)	Rashidat Sadiq
C	(Ivory Coast)	Fatoumata Camara

2009 FIBA Africa Women's Clubs Champions Cup

First Bank Basketball Club
2nd Title

Most Valuable Player
(United States) Danielle Green

== See also ==
- 2009 FIBA Africa Championship for Women
