= University of Douala =

Public university in Cameroon

- Université de Douala (French)
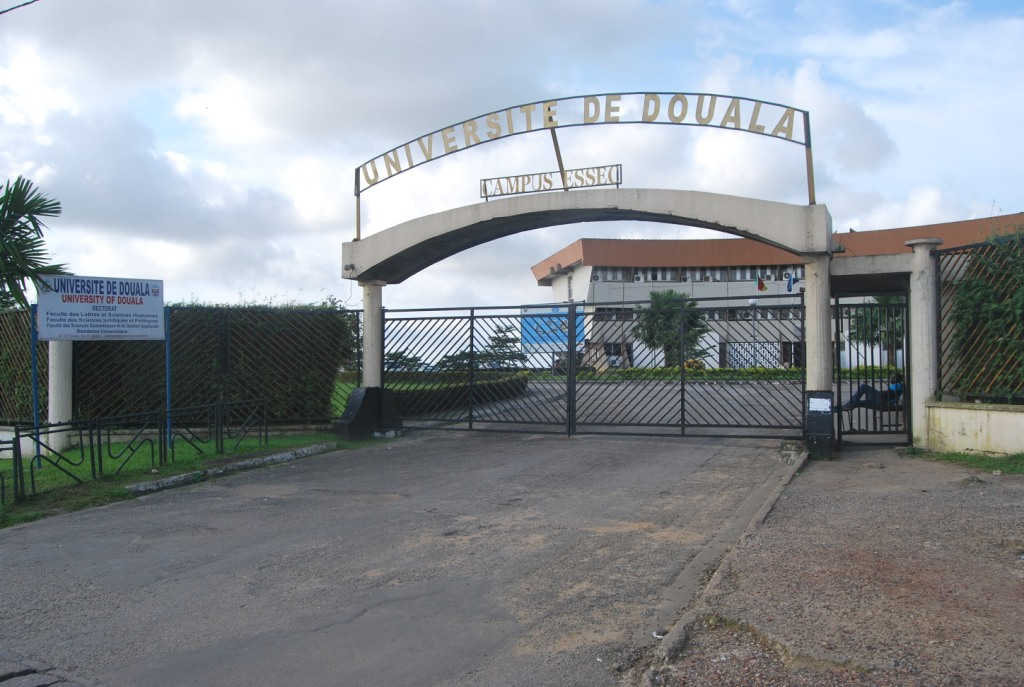
- Type: Public
- Established: 1993; 33 years ago
- Location: Douala, Cameroon; 4°3′20″N 9°44′5″E
- Campus: Urban
- Nickname: UDla
- Website: University website

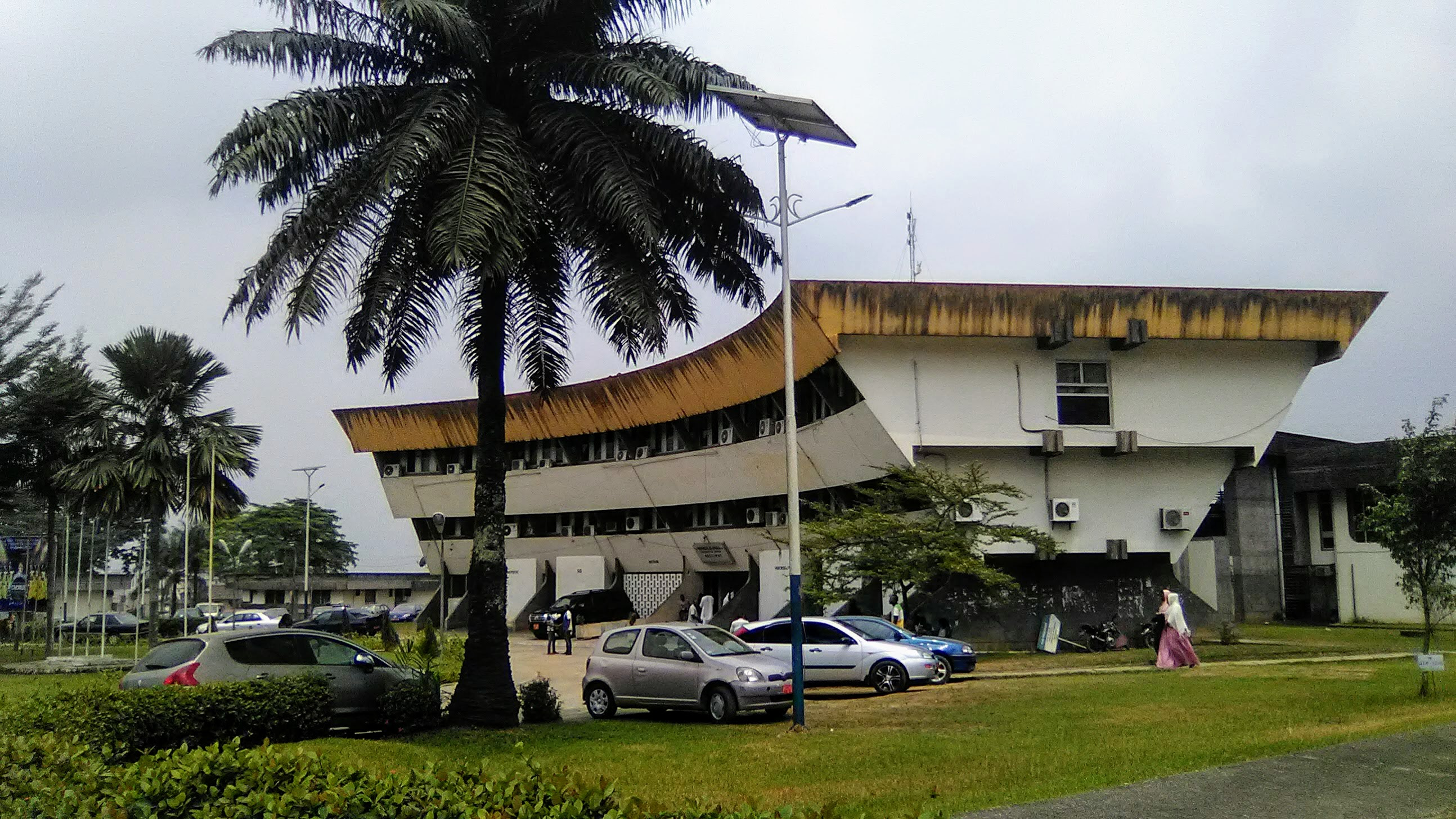
Rector's office, University of Douala, Cameroon, 2020.

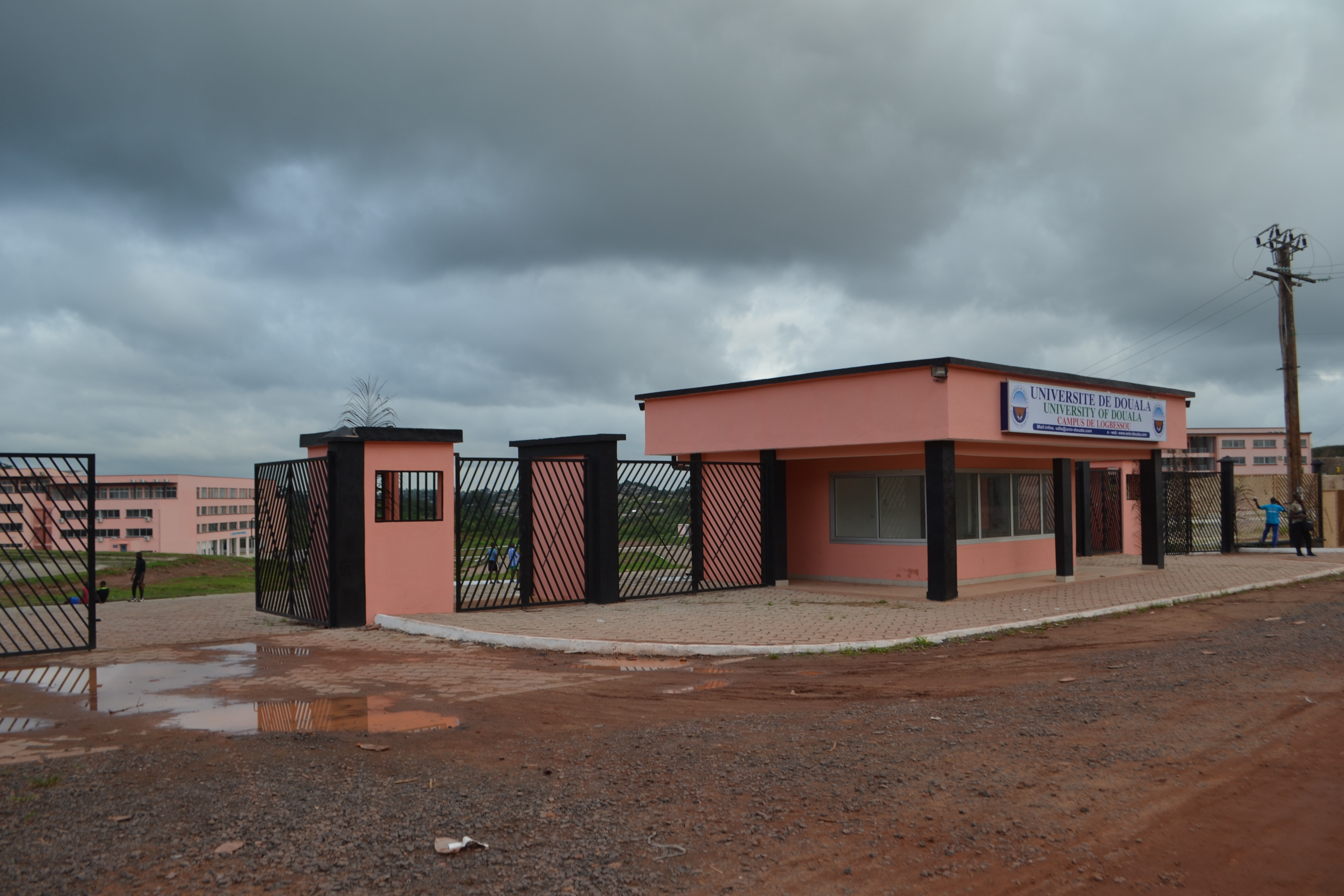
Entrance of Logbessou Campus, University of Douala, 2017.

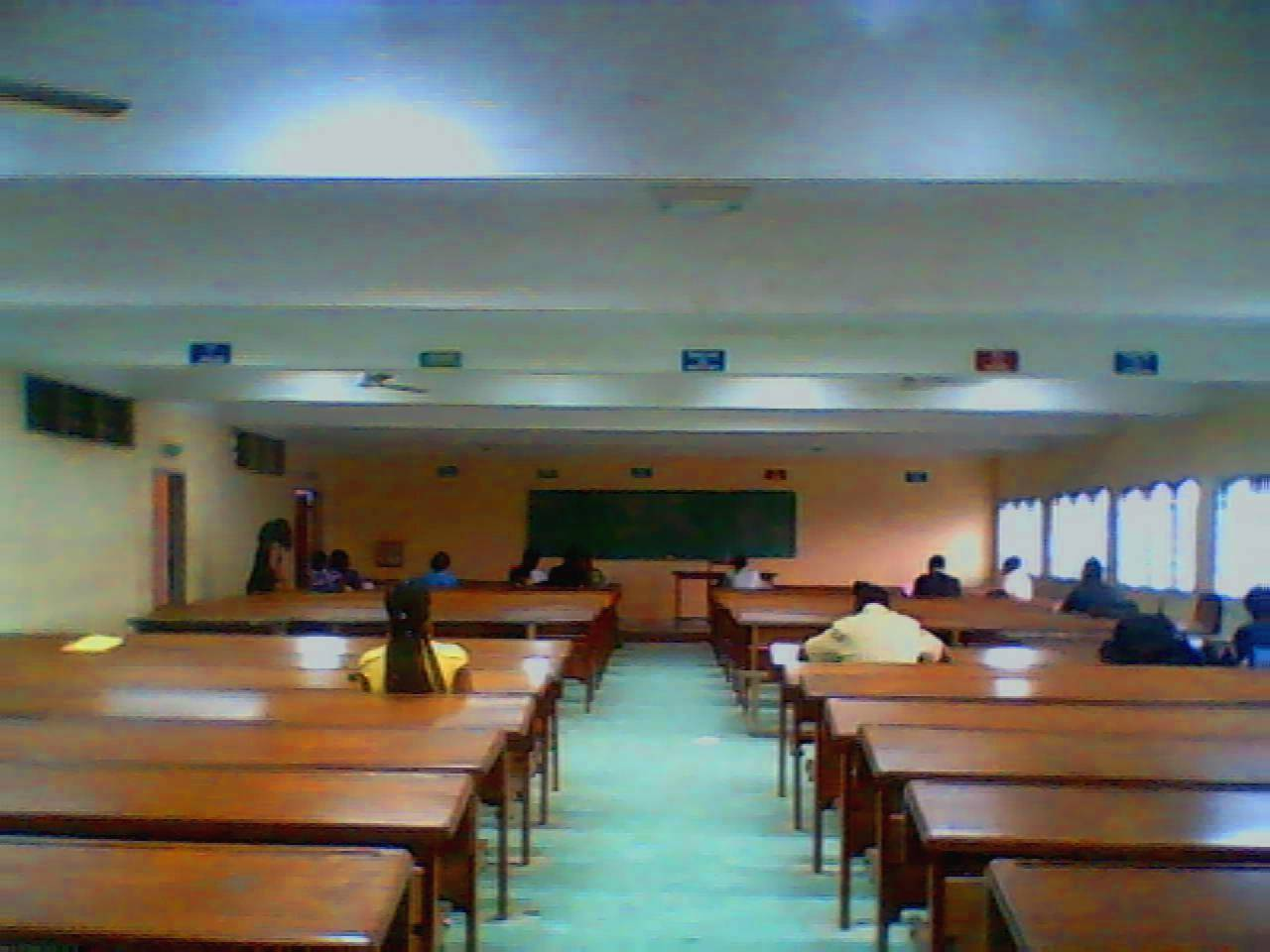
Lecture hall, University of Douala, 2012.

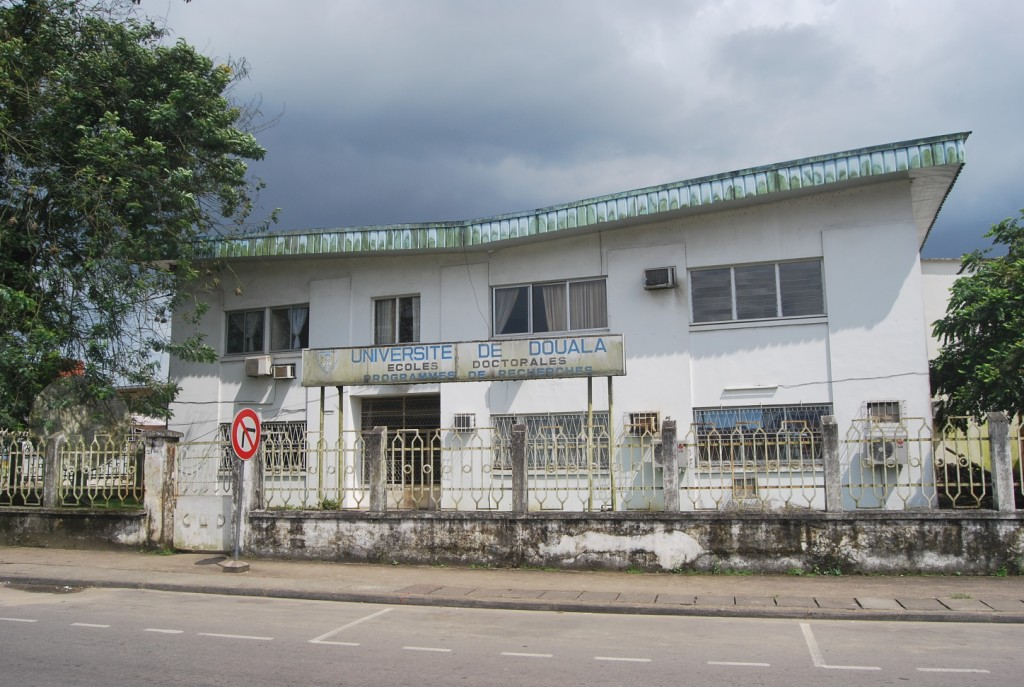
École doctorale (doctoral school), University of Douala, 2013.

The University of Douala (UDla; French: Université de Douala), is located in Douala in Cameroon. The University of Douala is one of the ten public universities of Cameroon and has around 40.000 students, 600 teachers and around 600 administrators and collaborators.

== History ==
The current structure of the University of Douala was established in 1993. The university incorporated the previous University Centre (Centre universitaire established in 1977) which consisted of the École supérieure des sciences économiques et commerciales (ESSEC established in 1977) and the École normale supérieure d'enseignement technique (ENSET established in 1979) and which was transformed into a university in 1992.

== Faculties, institutes and professional schools ==
There are five faculties: Faculté des sciences (science), Faculté des sciences juridiques et politiques (law and political science), Faculté des lettres et sciences humaines (letters and humanities), Faculté des sciences économiques et gestion appliquée (economics and management), and the Faculté de médecine et sciences pharmaceutiques (medecine and pharmacy).

The University of Douala has four institutes: the Institut universitaire de technologie (technology), Institut des sciences halieutiques, Institut des beaux-arts (arts), and Académie Internet (information science, internet).

There are three professional schools (Écoles): École supérieure des sciences économiques et commerciales (ESSEC), École normale supérieure d'enseignement technique (ENSET), and École nationale supérieure polytechnique de Douala (ENSPD).

== Campuses ==
The University of Douala has six locations in different neighborhoods of the city of Douala:

- the main Campus Bassa (Cité Sic) hosting the Écoles superieures des sciences économiques et commerciales (ESSEC business school), Faculté des sciences juridiques et commerciales (law, commerce), Faculté des sciences économiques (economics), Faculté de génie industriel (industrial engineering), and the Faculté de médecine (medicine).
- Campus Ndogbong: Institut universitaire de technologie and École normale supérieure d'enseignement technique (ENSET).
- Campus Akwa: École doctorale
- Campus Nkongsamba
- Campus Yabassi
- Campus Logbessou (construction started in 2011)

== Courses ==
The university provides training in economics and commerce, technical training, industrial engineering, medicine and pharmaceutics, arts, fisheries science, humanities, law and politics, sciences, economic sciences and management.

== Collaborations ==
The university is partner of the Agence Universitaire de la Francophonie (AUF), the Association of African Universities (AUA), AIU International Association of Universities (AIU), Association of Commonwealth Universities (ACU), the International Atomic Energy Agency (IAEA), the Conseil Africain et Malgache pour l'Enseignement Supérieur (CAMES), the African and Malagasy Council of Higher Education), UNESCO and the Conference of rectors of francophone universities of Africa and the Indian Ocean (CRUFAOCI).
