= Silvia Veloso =

Mozambican basketball player

No. 5 – Ferroviário de Maputo
- Position: Guard

Personal information
- Born: October 18, 1998 (age 28) Beira, Mozambique
- Listed height: 5 ft 7 in (1.70 m)

Career information
- College: Seward CC (2018–2019); Cumberlands (2019–2021)
- Playing career: 2022–present

Career history
- 2022–present: Ferroviário de Maputo

Silvia Veloso (born October 18, 1998) is a Mozambican basketball player. She plays for Ferroviário de Maputo of the Women's Basketball League Africa (WBLA). Veloso also played for the University of the Cumberlands Patriot and also the Mozambique women's national basketball team.

== High school career ==
Veloso played under Lionel Manhique in Mozambique. She averaged 16 points, 11 rebounds and 2 assists per game.

== College career ==
Veloso previously schooled at Seward County Community College in Liberal, Kansas. She played in 35 games with 32 starts averaging 22.7 minutes per game in her freshman year.

Veloso moved to the University of the Cumberlands and in her junior year. She played in 28 games while starting 25 and averaged 13.1 points, 87 assists. As a senior she played in 20 games while starting 19. And also recorded 250 points, 131 rebounds, 71 steals and 67 assists.

== Professional career ==
Veloso joined Ferroviário de Maputo in her native Mozambique after her college career in 2022.

== National team career ==
Veloso has been part of Mozambique women basketball national team since a very young age where she played in the U-16 category during Africa U16 Championship for Women in 2013. She averaged 9.7 points, 5.3 rebounds and 2.7 assists. She also participated in Afrobasket U18 Women in 2016, where she averaged 16.3 points, 4.5 rebounds and 2.7 assists. Also in 2021 FIBA Women's AfroBasket, she averaged 2.4 points, 0 rebounds and 0.4 assists.
