= Nkem Akaraiwe =

Nigerian basketball player

No. 12 – First Bank
- Position: Forward
- League: ZWBL

Personal information
- Born: 22 December 1996 (age 29) Okwe, Nigeria
- Listed height: 6 ft 0 in (1.83 m)
- Listed weight: 154 lb (70 kg)

Career information
- WNBA draft: 2018: undrafted
Medals
Women's basketball
Representing Nigeria
African Games
| Silver medal – second place | 2015 Brazzaville | Team |
AfroBasket
| Gold medal – first place | 2021 Cameroon |

Nkem Akaraiwe (born 22 December 1996) is a Nigerian basketball player for First Bank and the Nigerian national team.

She participated in the 2018 FIBA Women's Basketball World Cup.
