= Al Ahly Women's Basketball =

- Nickname: The Red Devils
- Leagues: Egyptian Women's Basketball League; Women's Basketball League Africa
- Founded: 1936
- Arena: Al Ahly Sports Hall
- Location: Cairo, Egypt
- Team colors
- Head coach: (Egypt) Tarek Khairy
- Championships: 27 Egyptian League; 18 Egypt Cup; 1 Women's Basketball League Africa
- Website: Official Website
Home	Away

Al Ahly Women's Basketball (Arabic: النادي الأهلي لكرة السلة للسيدات) is a basketball club located in Cairo, Egypt that currently plays in the Egyptian Basketball League Top Division. The club, nicknamed The Red Devils, won the Arab Women's Club Basketball Championship in 1996. The club is also the 16-time winner of the Women's Egypt Basketball League and the 13-time winner of the Egypt Basketball Cup. The current club president is Mahmoud El Khatib.

== Honours ==
=== National achievements ===
- Women's Egypt Basketball League :
  Winners (27) (Record) : 1960–61, 1963–64, 1964–65, 1965–66, 1969–70, 1981–82, 1984–85, 1986–87, 1987–88, 1990–91, 1992–93, 1993–94, 1994–95, 1995–96, 1996–97, 1997–98, 2001–02, 2002–03, 2003–04, 2006–07, 2007–08, 2017–18, 2018–19, 2019–20, 2022–23, 2023–24, 2024–25
- Women's Egypt Basketball Cup :
  Winners (18) : 1982–83, 1985–86, 1994–95, 1995–96, 1997–98, 1999–00, 2000–01, 2001–02, 2003–04, 2005–06, 2006–07, 2007–08, 2016–17, 2017–18, 2020–21, 2022–23, 2023–24, 2024–25
- Egypt Mortabat Basketball League :
  Winners (11) (Record) : 2013–14, 2015–16, 2016–17, 2017–18, 2018–19, 2019–20, 2020–21, 2021–22, 2022–23, 2024–25, 2025–26
- Women's Egyptian Super Cup :
  Winners (4) (Record) : 2020, 2022, 2023, 2024

=== International achievements ===
- Women's Basketball League Africa :
  - Champions (1) : 2025
  - Runners-up : 2024
  - Third place : 2019

=== Regional Achievements ===
- Arab Women's Club Basketball Championship :
  - Champions (1) : 1996
  - Runners-up : 1999, 2002, 2018, 2026
  - Third place : 1995, 2000

== Sports Hall information ==
- Name: – Al Ahly Sports Hall
- City: – Cairo
- Capacity: – 2500

== Technical and managerial staff ==
Name	Role	Nationality
Tarek Khairy	Head coach	Egyptian

== Kit manufacturers and shirt sponsors ==
Period	Kit supplier	Shirt sponsors
2006-2009	(Germany) Puma	(United Kingdom) Vodafone / (Egypt) Juhayna / (United States) Chevrolet / (United States) Coca-Cola
2009-2011	(Germany) Adidas	(United Kingdom) Vodafone / (Egypt) Juhayna / (United States) Chevrolet / (United States) Coca-Cola
2011-2015	(Germany) Adidas	(United Arab Emirates) Etisalat / (Egypt) Juhayna / (United States) Chevrolet
2015-2017	(Italy) Diadora	(United Kingdom) Vodafone / (Egypt) Juhayna / (China) Huawei / (Egypt) Egyptian Steel / (United Kingdom) Shell Helix / (United States) Domino's
2017-2018	(Germany) Hummel	(United Kingdom) Vodafone / (Egypt) Juhayna / (China) Huawei / (Egypt) Egyptian Steel / (United Kingdom) Shell Helix / (United States) Domino's
2018-2019	(Germany) Hummel	(Egypt) TORNADO / (India) LAVA / (United Kingdom) Vodafone
2019-2020	(Spain) Kelme	(Egypt) WE / (Egypt) TIGER / (Egypt) GLC Paints / (United Kingdom) Shell Helix

== Club Presidents ==
No	Period	Name	From	To
1	1st	(England) Mitchel Ince	1907	1908
2	1st	(Egypt) Aziz Ezzat Pacha	1908	1916
3	1st	(Egypt) Abdelkhaleq Tharwat Pacha	1916	1924
4	1st	(Egypt) Gaafar Waly Pacha	1924	1940
5	1st	(Egypt) Mohamed Taher Pacha	1940	1941
6	2nd	(Egypt) Gaafar Waly Pacha	1941	1944
7	1st	(Egypt) Ahmed Hasanein Pacha	1944	1946
8	1st	(Egypt) Ahmed Aboud Pacha	1946	1961
9	1st	(Egypt) Salah Desouky Sheshtawy	1961	1965
10	1st	(Egypt) Abdelmohsen Kamel Mortagy	1965	1967
11	1st	(Egypt) Ibrahim El Wakil	1967	1972
12	2nd	(Egypt) Abdelmohsen Kamel Mortagy	1972	1980
13	1st	(Egypt) Saleh Selim	1980	1988
14	1st	(Egypt) Mohamed Abdou Saleh El Wahsh	1988	1992
15	2nd	(Egypt) Saleh Selim	1992	2002
16	1st	(Egypt) Hassan Hamdy	2002	2014
17	1st	(Egypt) Mahmoud Taher	2014	2017
18	1st	(Egypt) Mahmoud El Khatib	2017	Present

== See also ==
- Al Ahly FC
- Al Ahly FC Women
- Al Ahly (volleyball)
- Al Ahly Women's Volleyball
- Al Ahly (basketball)
- Al Ahly (handball)
- Al Ahly Women's Handball
- Al Ahly (table tennis)
- Al Ahly (water polo)
- Port Said Stadium riot
- Al-Ahly TV
