= Women's Basketball League Africa =

Women's basketball tournament in Africa

- Current season, competition or edition: 2025 Women's Basketball League Africa
- Sport: Basketball
- Founded: 1985
- No. of teams: 10
- Continent: FIBA Africa (Africa)
- Most recent champion: (Egypt) Al Ahly (1st title) (2025)
- Most titles: (Angola) Interclube (5 titles)

The FIBA Africa Women's Basketball League is the highest continental tournament in African women's basketball. It is the counterpart of the men's basketball competition FIBA Africa Clubs Champions Cup. It is organized by the FIBA Africa and played by the champions of the leagues of the African countries.

The tournament was known as the FIBA Africa Women's Basketball Cup until the league rebranded in 2023 in the "Africa Women's Basketball League" (AWBL). A year later, the name was slightly adjusted to "Women's Basketball League Africa" (WBLA).

== Finals ==
Year	Host city	Champion	Score	Runner-up	Third place	Score	Fourth place
1985	(Senegal) Dakar	AS Bopp (Senegal)	66–49	(Ivory Coast) Stade d'Abidjan	Maxaquene (Mozambique)	51–47	(Angola) Petro Atlético
1987	(Ivory Coast) Abidjan	Tourbillon (Democratic Republic of the Congo)	–	(Cameroon) ONCPB	Stade d'Abidjan (Ivory Coast)	–	(Nigeria) Bini Queens
1989	(Democratic Republic of the Congo) Kinshasa	Tourbillon (Democratic Republic of the Congo)	–	(Senegal) DUC	Stade d'Abidjan (Ivory Coast)	–	(Angola) Interclube
1991	(Mozambique) Maputo	Maxaquene (Mozambique)	–	(Democratic Republic of the Congo) Tourbillon	ASFO Dakar (Senegal)	–	(Democratic Republic of the Congo) Hatari
1993	(Senegal) Dakar	DUC (Senegal)	–	(Mozambique) Maxaquene	Desportivo de Maputo (Mozambique)	–	(Mali) Djoliba AC
1995	(Tunisia) Tunis	Stade Tunisien (Tunisia)	–	(Senegal) AS Bopp	Desportivo de Maputo (Mozambique)	–	(Democratic Republic of the Congo) Radi
1997	(Senegal) Dakar	DUC (Senegal)	–	(Mali) Djoliba AC	Desportivo da Nocal (Angola)	–	(Democratic Republic of the Congo) Vita Club
1999	(Senegal) Dakar	DUC (Senegal)	–	(Mali) Djoliba AC	First Bank (Nigeria)	–	(Mozambique) Desportivo de Maputo
2001	(Ivory Coast) Abidjan	Académica de Maputo (Mozambique)	64–60	(Angola) Primeiro de Agosto	Abidjan Basket Club (Ivory Coast)	–	(Democratic Republic of the Congo) Arc-en-Ciel
2003	(Mozambique) Maputo	First Bank (Nigeria)	55–54	(Angola) Primeiro de Agosto	Maxaquene (Mozambique)	–	(Democratic Republic of the Congo) Arc-en-Ciel
2005	(Mali) Bamako	Djoliba AC (Mali)	73–64	(Angola) Primeiro de Agosto	First Bank (Nigeria)	83–73	(Mozambique) ISPU
2006	(Gabon) Libreville	Primeiro de Agosto (Angola)	84–76	(Mozambique) Ferroviário de Maputo	First Bank (Nigeria)	86–81	(Angola) Interclube
2007	(Mozambique) Maputo	Desportivo de Maputo (Mozambique)	64–47	(Angola) Primeiro de Agosto	Ferroviário de Maputo (Mozambique)	63–56	(Mozambique) ISPU
2008	(Kenya) Nairobi	Desportivo de Maputo (Mozambique)	70–63	(Angola) Primeiro de Agosto	First Bank (Nigeria)	76–62	(Ivory Coast) Abidjan Basket Club
2009	(Benin) Cotonou	First Bank (Nigeria)	64–55	(Ivory Coast) Abidjan Basket Club	Desportivo de Maputo (Mozambique)	57–50	(Angola) Interclube
2010	(Tunisia) Bizerte	Interclube (Angola)	67–63	(Mozambique) Desportivo de Maputo	Abidjan Basket Club (Ivory Coast)	58–55	(Nigeria) First Bank
2011	(Nigeria) Lagos	Interclube (Angola)	81–55	(Nigeria) First Bank	First Deepwater (Nigeria)	66–57	(Angola) Maculusso
2012	(Ivory Coast) Abidjan	Liga Muçulmana (Mozambique)	53–43	(Angola) Interclube	Abidjan Basket Club (Ivory Coast)	51–49	(Angola) Primeiro de Agosto
2013	(Morocco) Meknes	Interclube (Angola)	61–60	(Angola) Primeiro de Agosto	Eagle Wings (Kenya)	67–64	(Nigeria) First Deepwater
2014	(Tunisia) Sfax	Interclube (Angola)	75–74	(Angola) Primeiro de Agosto	CS Sfaxien (Tunisia)	75–61	(Nigeria) First Bank
2015	(Angola) Luanda	Primeiro de Agosto (Angola)	69–53	(Angola) Interclube	Ferroviário de Maputo (Mozambique)	71–54	(Nigeria) First Bank
2016	(Mozambique) Maputo	Interclube (Angola)	67–49	(Mozambique) Ferroviário de Maputo	First Bank (Nigeria)	62–54	(Angola) Primeiro de Agosto
2017	(Angola) Luanda	Primeiro de Agosto (Angola)	65–51	(Mozambique) Ferroviário de Maputo	First Bank (Nigeria)	70–61	(Angola) Interclube
2018	(Mozambique) Maputo	Ferroviário de Maputo (Mozambique)	59–56	(Angola) Interclube	First Bank (Nigeria)	93–69	(Democratic Republic of the Congo) Vita Club
2019	(Egypt) Cairo	Ferroviário de Maputo (Mozambique)	91–90 (OT)	(Angola) Interclube	Al Ahly SC (Egypt)	88–65	(Egypt) Sporting Alexandria
2022	(Mozambique) Maputo	Sporting Alexandria (Egypt)	65–58	(Mozambique) Costa do Sol	Ferroviário de Maputo (Mozambique)	71–67	(Angola) Interclube
2023	(Egypt) Alexandria	Sporting Alexandria (Egypt)	103–59	(Kenya) KPA	Interclube (Angola)	83–68	(Rwanda) REG
2024	(Senegal) Dakar	Ferroviário de Maputo (Mozambique)	81–72	(Egypt) Al Ahly	APR (Rwanda)	96–94 (OT)	(Senegal) ASC Ville de Dakar
2025	(Egypt) Cairo	Al Ahly (Egypt)	77–51	(Mozambique) Ferroviário de Maputo	APR (Rwanda)	90–84 (OT)	(Senegal) ASC Ville de Dakar

== Winners by club ==
Rank	Clubs	Winners	Runners-up	Thirds	Total finals	Winning years
1	(Angola) Interclube	5	4	1	9	2010, 2011, 2013, 2014, 2016
2	(Angola) Primeiro de Agosto	3	7	0	10	2006, 2015, 2017
3	(Mozambique) Ferroviário de Maputo	3	4	3	7	2018, 2019, 2024
4	(Senegal) DUC	3	1	0	4	1993, 1997, 1999
5	(Nigeria) First Bank	2	1	8	3	2003, 2009
6	(Mozambique) Desportivo de Maputo	2	1	3	3	2007, 2008
7	(Democratic Republic of the Congo) Tourbillon	2	1	0	3	1987, 1989
8	(Egypt) Alexandria Sporting Club	2	0	0	2	2022, 2023
9	(Mali) Djoliba AC	1	2	0	3	2005
10	(Mozambique) Maxaquene	1	1	2	2	1991
11	(Senegal) AS Bopp	1	1	0	2	1985
12	(Egypt) Al Ahly	1	1	1	2	2025
12	(Mozambique) Liga Muçulmana	1	0	0	1	2012
12	(Mozambique) Académica de Maputo	1	0	0	1	2001
12	(Tunisia) Stade Tunisien	1	0	0	1	1995

== Winners by country ==
Rank	Country	Wins	Runners-up	Thirds	Total finals
1	Angola	8	11	1	19
2	Mozambique	8	6	7	14
3	Senegal	4	2	1	6
4	Egypt	3	1	1	4
5	Nigeria	2	1	7	3
6	DR Congo	2	1	0	3
7	Mali	1	2	0	3
8	Tunisia	1	0	1	1
9	Rwanda	0	0	2	0
Total		29	24	20	53

== MVP Award ==
Year	Winner
2001	N/A
2002	N/A
2003	N/A
2004	N/A
2005	(Democratic Republic of the Congo) Pauline Akonga-Nsimbo
2006	(Angola) Domitila Ventura
2007	(Senegal) Salimata Diatta
2008	(Mozambique) Deolinda Ngulela
2009	(United States) Danielle Green
2010	(United States) Danielle Green
2011	(United States) Danielle Green

Year	Winner
2012	(Mozambique) Clarisse Machanguana
2013	(United States) Italee Lucas
2014	(Mozambique) Leia Dongue
2015	(Mozambique) Leia Dongue
2016	(United States) Sequoia Holmes
2017	(United States) Alicia DeVaughn
2018	(Angola) Italee Lucas
2019	(Mozambique) Ingvild Mucauro
2022	(Egypt) Hagar Amer
2023	(United States) Cierra Dillard
2024	(Senegal) Ndioma Kané

== See also ==
- FIBA Africa Championship for Women
