= Ingvild Mucauro =

Mozambican basketball player (born 1992)

Costa do Sol

Personal information
- Born: 12 September 1992
- Listed height: 5 ft 10 in (1.78 m)

Ingvild da Otilia Agostinho Mucauro (born 12 September 1992) is a Mozambican basketball player who was named MVP at the 2019 Africa Women's Champions Cup in recognition of driving Ferroviario de Maputo to being crowned African champions for the second time in a row.

== Career ==
In 2018, she was one of the four players that led the Ferroviario in double figures which prevented First Bank's 5-game unbeaten run from reaching the final of the FIBA Africa Champions Cup for Women.

In 2021, Mozambique finished fifth at the 2021 FIBA Women's AfroBasket where Mucauro was tagged the top performer at the tournament, top scored for her team in one minute and 24 seconds of the match with 21 points. she was also among the tournament leaders with 3.3 steals per game.

She also participated in the 2023 FIBA Women's AfroBasket where she and Silvia Veloso contributed to the pressure against their opponents making sure no opponent team scored more than 59 points, Mucauro also made use of her skills in leading her country to scoring.
