= Al-Ahly (disambiguation) =

Al-Ahly or Al-Ahli may refer to:

== Sports ==
=== Football ===
==== Men Teams ====
- Al Ahly SC, Cairo, Egypt
- Al-Ahli Saudi FC, Jeddah, Saudi Arabia
- Al Ahly SC (Benghazi), Benghazi, Libya
- Al Ahli SC (Tripoli), Tripoli, Libya
- Al Ahli Club (Atbara), Atbara, Sudan
- Al Ahli SC (Khartoum), Khartoum, Sudan
- Al Ahli Club (Merowe), Merowe, Sudan
- Al Ahly Shendi Club, Shendi, Sudan
- Al Ahli SC (Wad Madani), Wad Medani, Sudan
- Ahli Sanaa Club, Sana'a, Yemen
- Ahli Taiz Club, Ta'izz, Yemen
- Al Ahly SC Nabatieh, Nabatieh, Lebanon
- Al Ahli SC Saida, Sidon, Lebanon
- Al Ahli SC (Amman), Amman, Jordan
- Al Ahli Club (Manama), Manama, Bahrain
- Al Ahli SC (Doha), Doha, Qatar
- Damascus Al-Ahli Club, Damascus, Syria
- Al Ittihad Ahli of Aleppo SC, Aleppo, Syria
- Shabab Al Ahli Club, Dubai, United Arab Emirates

==== Women Teams ====
- Al Ahly FC Women, Cairo, Egypt
- Al-Ahli Saudi FC (women), Jeddah, Saudi Arabia

=== Basketball ===
==== Men Teams ====
- Al Ahly (basketball), Cairo, Egypt
- Al Ahly Ly (basketball), Benghazi, Libya
- Al-Ahli Jeddah (basketball), Jeddah, Saudi Arabia
- Shabab Al Ahli Club (basketball), Dubai, United Arab Emirates

== Other sports ==
- Al Ahly (handball), Cairo, Egypt
- Al Ahly (table tennis), Cairo, Egypt
- Al Ahly (men's volleyball), Cairo, Egypt
- Al Ahly (women's volleyball), Cairo, Egypt
- Al Ahly (water polo), Cairo, Egypt
- Al Ahly (field hockey), Cairo, Egypt
- Al Ahly (roller hockey), Cairo, Egypt

== Hospitals ==
- Al-Ahli Arab Hospital, Gaza, Palestine
  - Al-Ahli Arab Hospital explosion, October 2023 explosion at the hospital during the Gaza war

== See also ==
- Al Ahly TV, a television channel specialising in the Egyptian football team Al Ahly SC
