= Al Ahly (roller hockey) =

Al Ahly SC (Roller Hockey)
- Full name: Al Ahly Sporting Club (ASC)
- League: Egypt Roller Hockey League; African Roller Hockey Club Championship
- Founded: 1945
- Colors: Red and white

Personnel
- Chairman: (Egypt) Mahmoud El Khatib
- Website: https://www.alahlyegypt.com
Home	Away

Al Ahly Roller hockey (Arabic: النادي الاهلي لهوكي الانزلاق), was one of Al Ahly SC club's sections that represented the club in Egypt, Roller hockey team in Al Ahly was one of the fewest teams who practised this sport in Egypt. Indeed, it is the first team ever to play this kind of sport in Egypt.

== History ==
Al Ahly was the best team ever in Egypt in roller hockey in the 1940s, as what is common with all of Al Ahly sports teams. Al Ahly as usual in this era, effectively participated in the formation of the first 100% Egyptian roller hockey federation, with support of other three Egyptian clubs including Al Sekka Al Hadid and Police. Al Ahly was a pioneer to introduce the Roller hockey into the Egyptian sports field. This was so difficult to find a customized ground to practise this sport. Fields for this sport were so few in Egypt in 1940s, and here was Al Ahly initiative to find a solution for such a concern. Al Ahly asked his ex-football player; Mahmoud Mokhtar Sakr, who was an architecture engineer and estate developer, to construct a customized ground for rolling hockey in Al Ahly land in Al Gazira. Al Ahly agreed with Mokhtar to construct that ground from his own finance, and in contrast, he will have the right for three years to rent it for any team or to hold any rolling activities on it and benefit from it, while Al Ahly will not pay anything for using it during this period. This is what is called the B.O.T system which becomes so familiar and followed by now in sports marketing and development.

Roller hockey team was founded in the mid-1940s. Al Ahly team was born a leading team in Egypt in roller hockey, and already managed to clinch lots of titles at that era. There was a female roller hockey team as well. The female team included : Shosha Fahmy Laila Zu Al Fakkar (actress), Magda Zu Al Fakkar, Nabila Mekkawy, Marina Estafridis, Ellie Estafridis, Drowin Mahnoud, Tahany Rashed, and Laila AlKheshen, Nadia Al Kordy, Nelly, Aida, Nahed, Sonia, Samira.

== Dis-solving the Roller hockey activity ==
A set of financial austerity decision was made by Al Ahly administrative board in 1968 following a lot of financial problems the club experienced due to the poor management by the club president Salah Al Dessouki, the situation of financial position for Egypt after 1967 war. All of that, were the reasons behind the club decision to dis-solve this sport activity. The club administrative board has decided at that time to use the roller hockey field to build new administrative building and playgrounds for the club members. The roller hockey field was demolished in November 1967, and the whole roller hockey activities was canceled by 1968.

== Honours ==
Cairo League:  Winners 5

- 1946/47 - 1947/48 - 1948/49 - 1949/50 - 1956/57

== Al Ahly effective impact on Roller Hockey in Egypt ==
In addition to be the first 100% Egyptian club to construct a roller hockey field and forming two teams; males and females. And how it positively affected in giving more chance for broadening the practice of this sport in Egypt. Al Ahly role was found more effective while taking about it on a global scale for Egypt. Egypt participated in three world cups competition in the era between 1940s and the beginning of 1950s. The first time was in 1948, and Egypt did a great performance there when beating Netherland by 5–0. Egypt Roller hockey national team members at that time were mostly of Al Ahly, which used to acquire the local competitions in Egypt at the same era. The national team travelled and participated in those activities on its members own money supported by Al Ahly, as the club used to carry out some sports and art activities and dedicate a margin of the financial revenue to support the participation of the national team in the roller hockey world cup. Egypt joined the Global federation for Roller hockey in 1947 after strenuous efforts by Mohamed Taher Pasha, the head of the local roller hockey federation and the president of the Egyptian Olympic games committee at that time. He was previous member of Al Ahly official board, and interim president at the beginning of the 1940s.

== Notable players ==
- (Egypt) Salah Lotfy
- (Egypt) Mohamed Sherif
- (Egypt) (Armenia) Edward Karyan
- (Egypt) (Armenia) Aurto Karyan
- (Egypt) (Armenia) Demi Estafridis
- (Egypt) Samir Shoeir
- (Egypt) Helmi Darwesh
- (Egypt) Ramzy Kassab
- (Egypt) Moharram
- (Egypt) Zaghlol
- (Egypt) Antwan
- (Egypt) Amin

== See also ==
- Al Ahly FC
- Al Ahly (volleyball)
- Al Ahly Women's Volleyball
- Al Ahly (basketball)
- Al Ahly Women's Basketball
- Al Ahly (handball)
- Al Ahly Women's Handball
- Al Ahly (table tennis)
- Al Ahly (water polo)
- Port Said Stadium riot
- Al-Ahly TV
