= Al Ahly (field hockey) =

Al Ahly SC (Hockey)
- Full name: Al Ahly Sporting Club (ASC)
- Founded: 1936
- Colors: Red and white

Personnel
- Chairman: (Egypt) Mahmoud El Khatib
- Website: https://www.alahlyegypt.com
Home	Away

Al Ahly Hockey (Arabic: النادي الاهلي للهوكى), was one of Al Ahly SC club's sections that represented the club in Egypt, Field hockey is one of the oldest sports to play in Egypt. There were unofficial competitions that were played at the inception of the last century by the English military teams while Egypt was under occupancy by the UK. Al Ahly as usual took the lead by 30's to be the first 100% Egyptian club to introduce this sport to his members and followers. This was at the time while there were another 20 sports are played within the club premises. Al Ahly was the best team in this sport in Egypt in the 1940s and 1950s. The club clinched most of the local competitions. But later, by end of the 1960s, the club took a decision to dis-solve this sport activity to reduce the costs as the club experienced severe financial problems after 1967 war, and the bad management as well by the club president at that time: Salah Al Dessouki.

== History ==
Hockey is played in Egypt officially since the inception of 1930s by high schools clubs such as Imperial, Tawfekia, Ibrahimeyya, and El Saieedeya schools, English military teams as well. But there was not full 100% Egyptian sporting club to run this sport for Egyptians. In 1936, Al Ahly legend Mahmoud Mokhtar El Titish was a member of the Egyptian Football Team who participated in 1936 Summer Olympic games in Berlin . He watched this sport there, found it looked like football at that time but played by sticks, and a smaller ball rather than the football one. After returning to Egypt, he started working on initiating the first hockey team for Al Ahly. He encouraged some of the newly retired footballers and other sportsmen in the club to join the team. He managed to, and it was the first 100% Egyptian sporting club to have a pure and full Egyptians team.

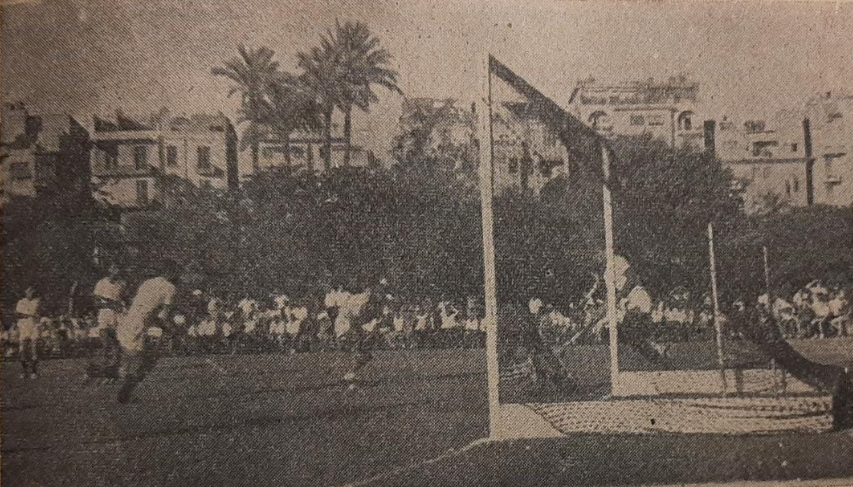
Al Ahly fans watching Al Ahly hockey match

The first hockey team roster for Al Ahly included: Mahmoud Mokhtar El Titish, Mourad Fahmy, Mohamed Fahmy, Mohamed Rasmy, Adly Yekan, Mokhtar Kotb, Ali Al Hamamsy. By end of 1939, Al Ahly officially announced this sport as one of the club's sports and started working towards preparing a customized field to play the sport on it. In 1937, there was no official or regular competitions for Hockey in Egypt. So, Al Ahly Hockey team activity was limited to compete with English Military teams, and high schools’ teams. In this year, Al Ahly faced Al Saeedeya school hockey team who won by 4–1 and impressed all the witnesses of the match. El Titish later asked this team members to join Al Ahly, and here was the real inception of Al Ahly hockey team that became good emerging between youth and experienced players. The team at that era included: Abdel Monem Al Sobky, Salah Habib, Tawfek Abdel Hady, Abdel Aziz Soliman, Ahmed Abaza, Yousry Abaza, Kadry Abaza, Kamal Khalil, Mahmoud Ra’fat, Salah Abdel Hafiz, Saied Abdel Hafiz. Between 1937 and the earliest of 40's, the team activity was limited to friendly matches against the foreign teams in Egypt. This helped the team to get more chances for practice and gaining more experience and competency. There was only one competition for Hockey in Egypt at that tine named Luker cup, but it was dedicated for schools, so Al Ahly was not permitted to join and play. On 1942, December, The Egyptian federation for Hockey was formed by a pioneer sportsman from Al Ahly; Mohamed Sobhy Al Atreby, whom the league later was named after. This was one of Al Ahly popular steps at that era to Egyptianize all sports in Egypt.

- Al Atreby was a member of the executive managing board of Al Ahly, and ex-secretary of the club between 1922 and 1928. He was ex-footballer for the club as well.

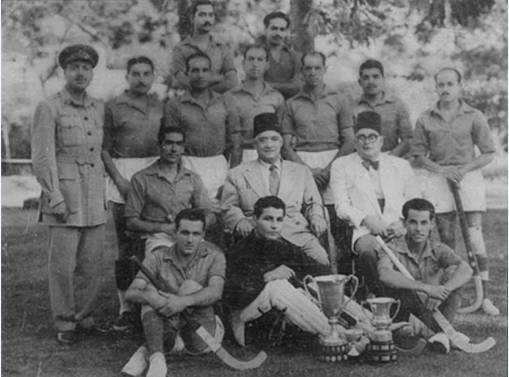
Al Ahly hockey team winner of Egyptian League and Cairo league

The first official league to play ever in Egypt was in 1942–1943 season. Al Ahly reached the final but lost. Next year, Al Ahly managed to clinch the first hockey title in its history after beating Farouk club (Zamalek) by 7–0 in the final. Al Ahly not only dominate the league, but also the Cairo league (Nadim Cup) as well. Both were the only hockey competition in Egypt at that time. The league in 40's and 50's the last century showed the participation of clubs as Al Ahly, Farouk club (Zamalek), Tersana SC, Egyptian Club (Alexandria), Al Jazeera, El Sekka El Hadid SC, Epis (PortSaid), Police, Greek club (Alexandria), and English military team as well. In addition to clinch the most local titles at the time, Al Ahly effect on this sport in Egypt was wider. The national Egyptian hockey team that participated in multiple global competition such as the Mediterranean games, was basically depending totally on Al Ahly team/ players. The most notable players of the team at 50's was: Mostafa Kamal, AbdelAziz Shokr, Mohamed AlZend, Youssed Abo Al Ezz, Mostafa Hamdy, Nabil Sheta, Hamdy Azzam, Mahmoud Al Zoghaby, Ismail AbdelFattah, AbdelAziz Salama, Mohamed Ali AlZahr, Gerges Ibrahim, Rao’d Izzat, Abbas Arafat.

== Dis-solving the hockey activity ==
By inception of the 1960s, Al Ahly president Ahmed Aboud Pasha was enforced by the government to leave Egypt. Salah Al Dessouki was appointed by the government as well to lead the club as a president. With Al Dessouki, the club experienced what is considered the darkest era in the club history because of his bad management which the financial aspect was one of it. Al Ahly did bad performance at all sports including football, and struggle financially in a horrific way. Even Al Dessouki left the club by inception of 1967, succeeded by Mortagy, but his bad management implications lasted for not short time. And Al Ahly was not lucky to have enough time to recover financially, as Egypt was at war situation starting from June 1967. The club board took the decision too reduce costs by dis-solving some sports activities, such as: Hockey, powerlifting, wrestling, boxing, and another 4 sports. Later, the hockey field was demolished and replaced by the current administrative building. This field for around 30 years witnessed the best Egyptian hockey team.

== Honours ==
- Egyptian League :

Winners: (9 titles) :

1943–44, 1946–47, 1947–48, 1949–50, 1950–51, 1951–52, 1952–53, 1954–55, 1956–57

- Cairo league :

Winners: (7 titles) :

1943–44, 1946–47, 1947–48, 1949–50, 1950–51, 1951–52, 1952–53, 1956–57

== Al Ahly VS foreign teams ==
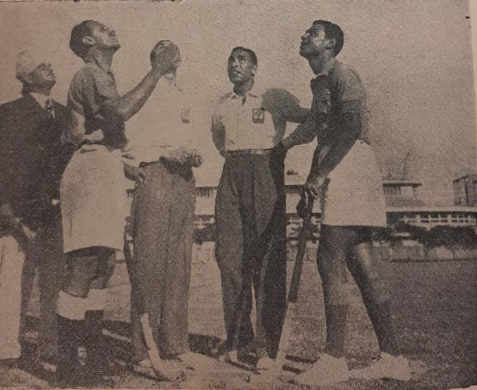
Al Ahly hockey team VS Indian Forces team at 1944

In addition to dominating this sport locally for years, Al Ahly matches against the foreign teams were amazing and attracted the fans and media at that time. There was an annual match between Al Ahly and the best selected 11 from the English military teams. Those matched used to play in April and December annually, and Al Ahly won most of it. The most famous match for Al Ahly at that time was against India troops team, which was one the most successful teams globally in the world. This match was played in 1944, and before it, India team won 32 matches, respectively. Al Ahly won the match by 3–1. This was the only and the first lose for India, and big crowd of Al Ahly fans was there to watch and support their team.

== Al Ahly journey to Europe ==
To gain more experience and enhance the team performance by competing against more professional clubs, Al Ahly traveled in July 1952 to play games against European teams in a friendly competition in Cyprus. Al Ahly played 4 games, won 3 and lost 1. Al Ahly defeated the winner of this friendly competition: Omonoia Nicosia by 2–1.

== Al Ahly effect for the national hockey team ==
Al Ahly left great effect globally for the Egyptian national hockey team. The national team won the golden medal of Mediterranean games twice in Barcelona 1955 and Naples 1963. The squad of the national team was 90% from Al Ahly team. For example, in 1955, the Egyptian national team included 10 players from Al Ahly, 1 from Tersana, 1 from Zamalek. This was the same in 1963. This prompted Al-Ahly's board of directors on both occasions to honor the entire Al Ahly hockey team in appreciation of outstanding performance and great achievement.

== Al Ahly female hockey team ==
Al Ahly formed a female hockey team at the same time formed the male one. The club was the first Egyptian club to have a female hockey team. The female team members were from the club other sports players as basketball for example, and from the club female members as well. But there wasn't any competition for hockey for females in Egypt as there was no or limited interest for female sports activities by other clubs at that time. Hence, the female team activity was limited to friendly matches against the male teams.

== Notable players ==
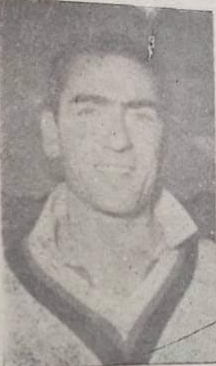
Mahmoud Raafat, the best hockey player in 1940s.

- 1930s

Mahmoud Mokhtar El Titish, Mourad Fahmy, Mohamed Fahmy, Mohamed Rasmy, Adly Yekan, Mokhtar Kotb, Ali Al Hamamsy.

- 1940s

AbdelMon’em AlSobky, Salah Habib, Tawfik AbdelHady, AbdelAziz Soliman, Ahmed Abaza, Yousry Abaza, Kadri Abaza, Kamal Khalil, Mahmoud Ra’fat, Salah AbdelHafiz, Saied AbdelHafiz. Ahmed Ma’rof, Gamal AbdelRahman, Ra’fat Ra’of, Al Messeri, Darwish.

- 1950s and 1960s

Mostafa Kamal. AbdelAziz Shokr, Mohamed AlZend, Youssed Abo AlEzz, Mostafa Hamdy, Nabil Shetta, Hamdy Azzam, Mahmoud AlZoghaby, Ismail AbdelFattah, AbdelAziz Salama, Gerges Ibrahim, Ra’of Izzat, Abbas Arafat, Zaki Mourad, Maher Fattin, Ali Al Zomor. AbdelAziz AlHosseiny, Omar Sami. Mohamed AlDarandalli.

== Club Presidents ==
No	Period	Name	From	To
1	1st	(England) Mitchel Ince	1907	1908
2	1st	(Egypt) Aziz Ezzat Pacha	1908	1916
3	1st	(Egypt) Abdelkhaleq Tharwat Pacha	1916	1924
4	1st	(Egypt) Gaafar Waly Pacha	1924	1940
5	1st	(Egypt) Mohamed Taher Pacha	1940	1941
6	2nd	(Egypt) Gaafar Waly Pacha	1941	1944
7	1st	(Egypt) Ahmed Hasanein Pacha	1944	1946
8	1st	(Egypt) Ahmed Aboud Pacha	1946	1961
9	1st	(Egypt) Salah Desouky Sheshtawy	1961	1965
10	1st	(Egypt) Abdelmohsen Kamel Mortagy	1965	1967
11	1st	(Egypt) Ibrahim El Wakil	1967	1972
12	2nd	(Egypt) Abdelmohsen Kamel Mortagy	1972	1980
13	1st	(Egypt) Saleh Selim	1980	1988
14	1st	(Egypt) Mohamed Abdou Saleh El Wahsh	1988	1992
15	2nd	(Egypt) Saleh Selim	1992	2002
16	1st	(Egypt) Hassan Hamdy	2002	2014
17	1st	(Egypt) Mahmoud Taher	2014	2017
18	1st	(Egypt) Mahmoud El Khatib	2017	Present

== See also ==
- Al Ahly FC
- Al Ahly (volleyball)
- Al Ahly Women's Volleyball
- Al Ahly (basketball)
- Al Ahly Women's Basketball
- Al Ahly (handball)
- Al Ahly Women's Handball
- Al Ahly (table tennis)
- Al Ahly (water polo)
- Port Said Stadium riot
- Al-Ahly TV
