= Al Ahly Women's Handball =

Egyptian handball club

- Full name: Al Ahly SC
- Founded: 1959
- Arena: Al Ahly Sports Hall
- Capacity: 2,500
- President: (Egypt) Mahmoud El Katib
- Head coach: (Egypt) Yasser Salah
- Captain: (Egypt) Mai Hesham
- League: (Egypt) Egyptian Handball League
- 2024–25: Champion
Home	Away

Al-Ahly Women's Handball team was founded in the 1950s as one of the first Egyptian women's Handball disciplines. The Club plays on its official home ground arena, Al Ahly Sports Hall.

- Al-Ahly Women's Handball team holds many records nationally. It is the most crowned team in the League with 46 titles and 37 Egyptian cup records, and internationally, the only team to achieve such high achievements.

== Honours ==
=== National titles ===
- Egyptian Handball League 46 (Record) :

Champions : 1961–62, 1968–69, 1969–70, 1970–71, 1971–72, 1972–73, 1973–74, 1974–75, 1975–76, 1976–77, 1977–78, 1979–80, 1988–89, 1989–90, 1991–92, 1992–93, 1994–95, 1995–96, 1996–97, 1997–98, 1998–99, 1999–00, 2000–01, 2001–02, 2002–03, 2003–04, 2004–05, 2005–06, 2006–07, 2007–08, 2008–09, 2009–10, 2010–11, 2011–12, 2012–13, 2013–14, 2014–15, 2015–16, 2016–17, 2017–18, 2018–19, 2020–21, 2022–23, 2023–24, 2024–25, 2025–26

- Egyptian Handball Cup 37 (Record) :

Champions : 1985–86, 1986–87, 1988–89, 1989–90, 1990–91, 1991–92, 1992–93, 1993–94, 1994–95, 1995–96, 1997–98, 1999–00, 2000–01, 2001–02, 2002–03, 2003–04, 2004–05, 2005–06, 2006–07, 2007–08, 2008–09, 2009–10, 2010–11, 2011–12, 2012–13, 2013–14, 2014–15, 2015–16, 2016–17, 2017–18, 2018–19, 2020–21, 2022–23, 2023–24, 2024–25, 2025–26

- Egyptian Handball Super Cup 5 (Record) :

Champions : 2014–15, 2016–17, 2018–19, 2024–25, 2025–26

=== International titles ===
- African Women's Handball Champions League 2 Champions : 1979, 2026

== Sports Hall information ==
- Name: – Al Ahly Sports Hall
- City: – Cairo
- Capacity: – 2500

== Current squad ==
Squad for the 2018–19 season

Goalkeepers

- (Egypt) Ghada Hossam
- (Egypt) Amina Khaled
- (Egypt) Hend Ashraf

Right Wingers

- (Egypt) Sara El Kholey
- (Egypt) Amina Atef

Left Wingers

- (Egypt) Mai Hesham
- (Egypt) Yara Shehata

Line players

- (Egypt) Nour Ahmed
- (Egypt) Yasmine Abdelrahim

Left Backs

- (Egypt) Menna Khaled
- (Egypt) Sara Hossam

Central Backs

- (Egypt) Nasra Eid
- (Egypt) Israa Sayed
- (Egypt) Yasmine Waheed
- (Egypt) Shimaa Emad Eldeen

Right Backs

- (Egypt) Nourhan Gamal
- (Egypt) Doaa Helmy

== Technical and managerial staff ==
Name	Role	Nationality
Yasser Salah	Head coach	Egyptian
	Assistant Coach	Egyptian
	Team Manager	Egyptian
	Physiotherapist	Egyptian

== Kit manufacturers and shirt sponsors ==
Period	Kit supplier	Shirt sponsors
2006-2009	(Germany) Puma	(United Kingdom) Vodafone / (Egypt) Juhayna / (United States) Chevrolet / (United States) Coca-Cola
2009-2011	(Germany) Adidas	(United Kingdom) Vodafone / (Egypt) Juhayna / (United States) Chevrolet / (United States) Coca-Cola
2011-2015	(Germany) Adidas	(United Arab Emirates) Etisalat / (Egypt) Juhayna / (United States) Chevrolet
2015-2017	(Italy) Diadora	(United Kingdom) Vodafone / (Egypt) Juhayna / (China) Huawei / (Egypt) Egyptian Steel / (United Kingdom) Shell Helix / (United States) Domino's
2017-2018	(Germany) Hummel	(United Kingdom) Vodafone / (Egypt) Juhayna / (China) Huawei / (Egypt) Egyptian Steel / (United Kingdom) Shell Helix / (United States) Domino's
2018-2019	(Germany) Hummel	(Egypt) TORNADO / (India) LAVA / (United Kingdom) Vodafone
2019-2020	(Spain) Kelme	(Egypt) WE / (Egypt) TIGER / (Egypt) GLC Paints / (United Kingdom) Shell Helix

== Club Presidents ==
No	Period	Name	From	To
1	1st	(England) Mitchel Ince	1907	1908
2	1st	(Egypt) Aziz Ezzat Pacha	1908	1916
3	1st	(Egypt) Abdelkhaleq Tharwat Pacha	1916	1924
4	1st	(Egypt) Gaafar Waly Pacha	1924	1940
5	1st	(Egypt) Mohamed Taher Pacha	1940	1941
6	2nd	(Egypt) Gaafar Waly Pacha	1941	1944
7	1st	(Egypt) Ahmed Hasanein Pacha	1944	1946
8	1st	(Egypt) Ahmed Aboud Pacha	1946	1961
9	1st	(Egypt) Salah Desouky Sheshtawy	1961	1965
10	1st	(Egypt) Abdelmohsen Kamel Mortagy	1965	1967
11	1st	(Egypt) Ibrahim El Wakil	1967	1972
12	2nd	(Egypt) Abdelmohsen Kamel Mortagy	1972	1980
13	1st	(Egypt) Saleh Selim	1980	1988
14	1st	(Egypt) Mohamed Abdou Saleh El Wahsh	1988	1992
15	2nd	(Egypt) Saleh Selim	1992	2002
16	1st	(Egypt) Hassan Hamdy	2002	2014
17	1st	(Egypt) Mahmoud Taher	2014	2017
18	1st	(Egypt) Mahmoud El Khatib	2017	Present

== See also ==
- Al Ahly FC
- Al Ahly (volleyball)
- Al Ahly Women's Volleyball
- Al Ahly (basketball)
- Al Ahly Women's Basketball
- Al Ahly (handball)
- Al Ahly Women's Handball
- Al Ahly (table tennis)
- Al Ahly (water polo)
- Port Said Stadium riot
- Al-Ahly TV
