= Egyptian Women's Volleyball League =

- Current season, competition or edition: 2025–26 Egyptian Women's Volleyball League
- Sport: Volleyball
- First season: 1978; 48 years ago
- Administrator: EVF
- No. of teams: 16 teams
- Country: Egypt
- Confederation: CAVB
- Continent: Africa
- Most recent champion: Al Ahly SC (42nd titles) (2025–26)
- Most titles: Al Ahly SC (42 titles)
- Level on pyramid: Level 1
- Relegation to: National 2
- Domestic cups: Egyptian Cup; Egyptian Super Cup
- International cups: CAVB African Club Championship; Arab Clubs Championship

The Egyptian Women's Volleyball League (Arabic : الدوري المصري للكرة الطائرة للسيدات ) is the highest level of domestic women's club volleyball in Egypt. The competition is organized and governed by the Egyptian Volleyball Federation and features clubs from across the country. The 2025–26 season featured 16 teams competing for the league title. Al Ahly SC has been the dominant club in the competition, with a long history of league success and a record 42 Egyptian Super League titles. Zamalek SC and Smouha are the main clubs outside Al Ahly SC to have won the league, making them among the most notable challengers in the competition.

== Titles by Clubs ==
Egyptian Women's Volleyball League titles by club
Rank	Club	Titles
1	Al Ahly SC	42
2	Zamalek SC	4
3	Smouha Sporting Club	1

== Winners list ==
Season	Champion
1978–79	Zamalek SC
1979–80	Zamalek SC
1980–81	Zamalek SC
1982–83	Zamalek SC
1983–84	Al Ahly SC
1984–85	Al Ahly SC
1985–86	Al Ahly SC
1986–87	Al Ahly SC
1987–88	Al Ahly SC
1988–89	Al Ahly SC
1989–90	Al Ahly SC
1990–91	Al Ahly SC
1991–92	Al Ahly SC
1992–93	Al Ahly SC
1993–94	Al Ahly SC
1994–95	Smouha SC
1995–96	Al Ahly SC

Season	Champion
1996–97	Al Ahly SC
1997–98	Al Ahly SC
1998–99	Al Ahly SC
1999–00	Al Ahly SC
2000–01	Al Ahly SC
2001–02	Al Ahly SC
2002–03	Al Ahly SC
2003–04	Al Ahly SC
2004–05	Al Ahly SC
2005–06	Al Ahly SC
2006–07	Al Ahly SC
2007–08	Al Ahly SC
2008–09	Al Ahly SC
2009–10	Al Ahly SC
2010–11	Al Ahly SC
2011–12	Al Ahly SC
2012–13	Al Ahly SC

Season	Champion
2013–14	Al Ahly SC
2014–15	Al Ahly SC
2015–16	Al Ahly SC
2016–17	Al Ahly SC
2017–18	Al Ahly SC
2018–19	Al Ahly SC
2019–20	Al Ahly SC
2020–21	Al Ahly SC
2021–22	Al Ahly SC
2022–23	Al Ahly SC
2023–24	Al Ahly SC
2024–25	Al Ahly SC
2025–26	Al Ahly SC

Sources :
