= Egyptian Table Tennis League =

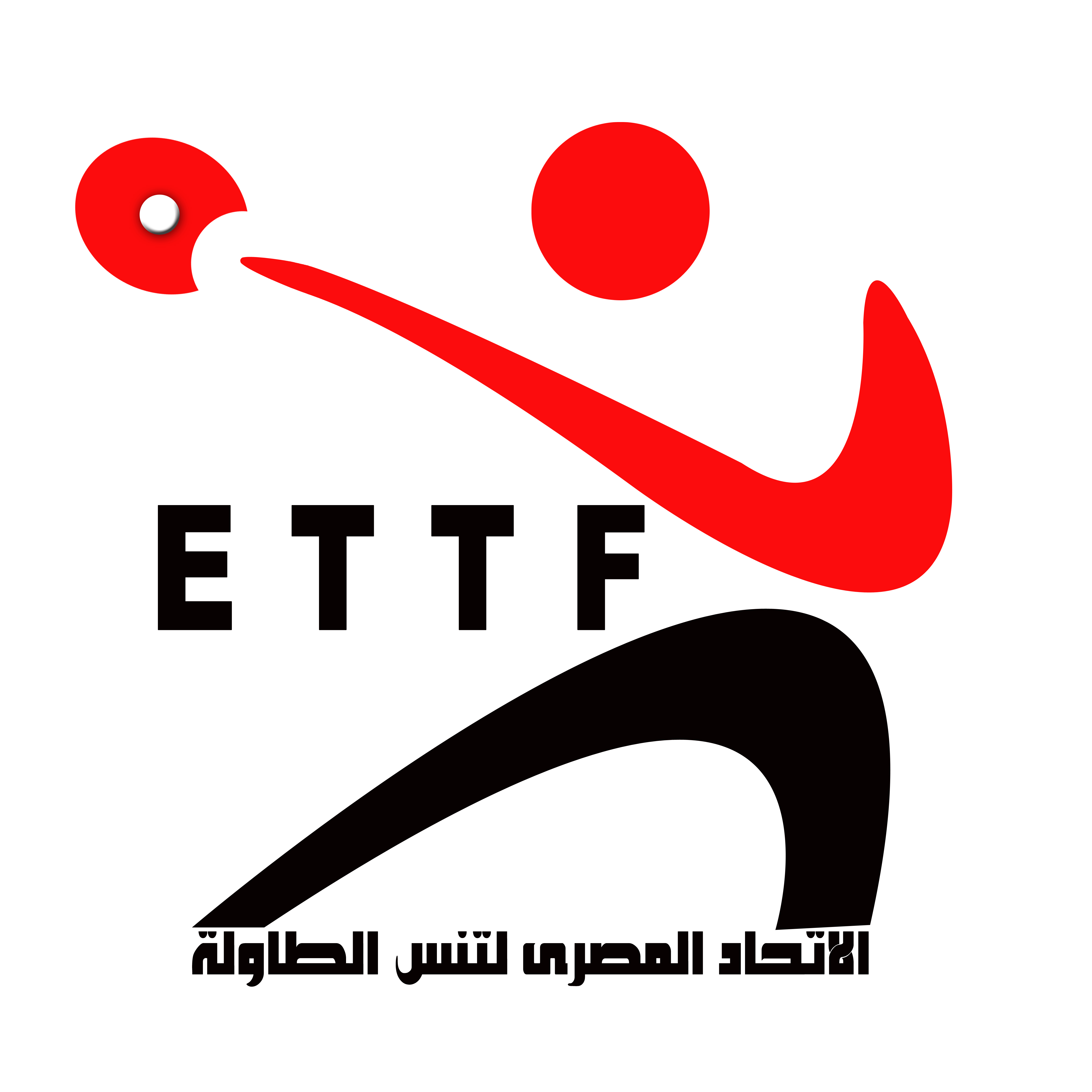
- Founded: 1979
- Country: Egypt
- Confederation: ITTF Africa
- Number of clubs: 16
- Level on pyramid: 1
- Domestic cup: Egypt Table tennis Cup
- International cup(s): ITTF African clubs Arab table tennis championship
- Current champions: Al Ahly (2026)
- Most championships: Al Ahly (35 titles)
- Broadcaster(s): Ontime Sports
- Website: ettf.org

The Egyptian Table tennis League is an Egyptian professional league for Egyptian Table tennis clubs, it was started for first time in 1979 before this time there was the "Gomhoria championship" which contain clubs and individual competitions, the winner of Egyptian Table tennis League represents Egypt in Africa Table Tennis Championship and Arab table tennis championship. Al Ahly is the most titled club in Egypt

== Champions ==
| No. | Season | Champion |
|---|---|---|
| 1 | 1979-80 | Al Ahly SC |
| 2 | 1980-81 | Al Ahly SC |
| 3 | 1981-82 | Al Ahly SC |
| 4 | 1982-83 | Al Ahly SC |
| 5 | 1983-84 | Al Ahly SC |
| 6 | 1984-85 | Al Ahly SC |
| 7 | 1985-86 | Al Ahly SC |
| 8 | 1986-87 | Zamalek S.C |
| 9 | 1987-88 | Zamalek S.C |
| 10 | 1988-89 | Al Ahly SC |
| 11 | 1989-90 | Zamalek S.C |
| 12 | 1990-91 | Al Ahly SC |
| 13 | 1991-92 | Al Ahly SC |
| 14 | 1992-93 | Al Ahly SC |
| 15 | 1993-94 | Al Ahly SC |
| 16 | 1994-95 | Zamalek S.C |
| 17 | 1995-96 | Al Ahly SC |
| 18 | 1996-97 | Al Ahly SC |
| 19 | 1997-98 | Al Ahly SC |
| 20 | 1998-99 | Al Ahly SC |
| 21 | 1999-00 | Zamalek S.C |
| 22 | 2000-01 | Zamalek S.C |
| 23 | 2001-02 | Zamalek S.C |
| 24 | 2002-03 | Al Ahly SC |
| 25 | 2003-04 | Al Ahly SC |
| 26 | 2004-05 | Zamalek S.C |
| 27 | 2005-06 | Zamalek S.C |
| 28 | 2006-07 | Al Ahly SC |
| 29 | 2007-08 | Al Ahly SC |
| 30 | 2008-09 | Zamalek S.C |
| 31 | 2009-10 | Al Ahly SC |
| 32 | 2010-11 | Al Ahly SC |
| 33 | 2011-12 | Al Ahly SC |
| 34 | 2012-13 | Al Ahly SC |
| 35 | 2013-14 | Al Ahly SC |
| 36 | 2014-15 | Al Ahly SC |
| 37 | 2015-16 | Al Ahly SC |
| 38 | 2016-17 | Al Ahly SC |
| 39 | 2017-18 | Al Ahly SC |
| 40 | 2018-19 | Al Ahly SC |
| 41 | 2019-20 | Al Ahly SC |
| 42 | 2020-21 | Al Ahly SC |
| 43 | 2021-22 | Al Ahly SC |
| 44 | 2022-23 | Al Ahly SC |
| 45 | 2023-24 | ENPPI SC |
| 46 | 2024-25 | Petrojet SC |
| 47 | 2025-26 | Al Ahly SC |

== Winners by club ==
| # | Clubs | Titles |
|---|---|---|
| 1 | (Egypt) Al Ahly SC | 35 |
| 2 | (Egypt) Zamalek SC | 10 |
| 3 | (Egypt) ENPPI SC | 1 |
| 4 | (Egypt) Petrojet SC | 1 |
