= 2024 FIVB Volleyball Women's Club World Championship =

International women's volleyball club competition

Tournament details
- Host country: China
- City: Hangzhou
- Dates: 17–22 December
- Teams: 8 (from 4 confederations)
- Venue: 1 (in 1 host city)

Final positions
- Champions: (Italy) Prosecco Doc Imoco Conegliano (3rd title)
- Runners-up: (China) Tianjin Bohai Bank
- Third place: (Italy) Numia Vero Volley Milano
- Fourth place: (Brazil) Dentil Praia Clube

Tournament awards
- MVP: (Sweden) Isabelle Haak
- Best Setter: (Poland) Joanna Wołosz
- Best OH: (China) Li Yingying (China) Zhu Ting
- Best MB: (Serbia) Hena Kurtagić (Italy) Sarah Luisa Fahr
- Best OPP: (Sweden) Isabelle Haak
- Best Libero: (China) Liu Liwen

Tournament statistics
- Matches played: 16
- Attendance: 34,940 (2,184 per match)

The 2024 FIVB Volleyball Women's Club World Championship was the 17th edition of the competition. For the second year in a row, it was held in Hangzhou, China.

== Qualification ==
Starting from 2024, the qualification for the Club World Championships will be as follows: two places per continent for Europe, Asia, and South America; one place for Africa; and finally, a club from the host nation will be granted a place. This change aims to ensure the fair representation from different continents and provides an opportunity for the host country to participate in the tournament.

Slots	Qualified as
1	Host club
2	CEV Champions League winners
2	CEV Champions League runners-up
2	CSV Club Championship winners
2	CSV Club Championship runners-up
2	AVC Club Championship winners
2	AVC Club Championship runners-up
1	CAVB Club Championship winners
Total: 8

=== Participating teams ===
Team (Confederation)	Qualified as
(China) Tianjin Bohai Bank (AVC)	Hosts
(Italy) Prosecco Doc Imoco Conegliano (CEV)	2024 European champions
(Italy) Numia Vero Volley Milano (CEV)	2024 European runners-up
(Brazil) Gerdau Minas (CSV)	2024 South American champions
(Brazil) Dentil Praia Clube (CSV)	2024 South American runners-up
(Japan) NEC Red Rockets Kawasaki (AVC)	2024 Asian champions
(Vietnam) LP Bank Ninh Bình (AVC)	2024 Asian runners-up
(Egypt) Zamalek SC (CAVB)	2024 African champions

== Venue ==
All matches
Hangzhou, China
Huanglong Gymnasium
Capacity: 8,000
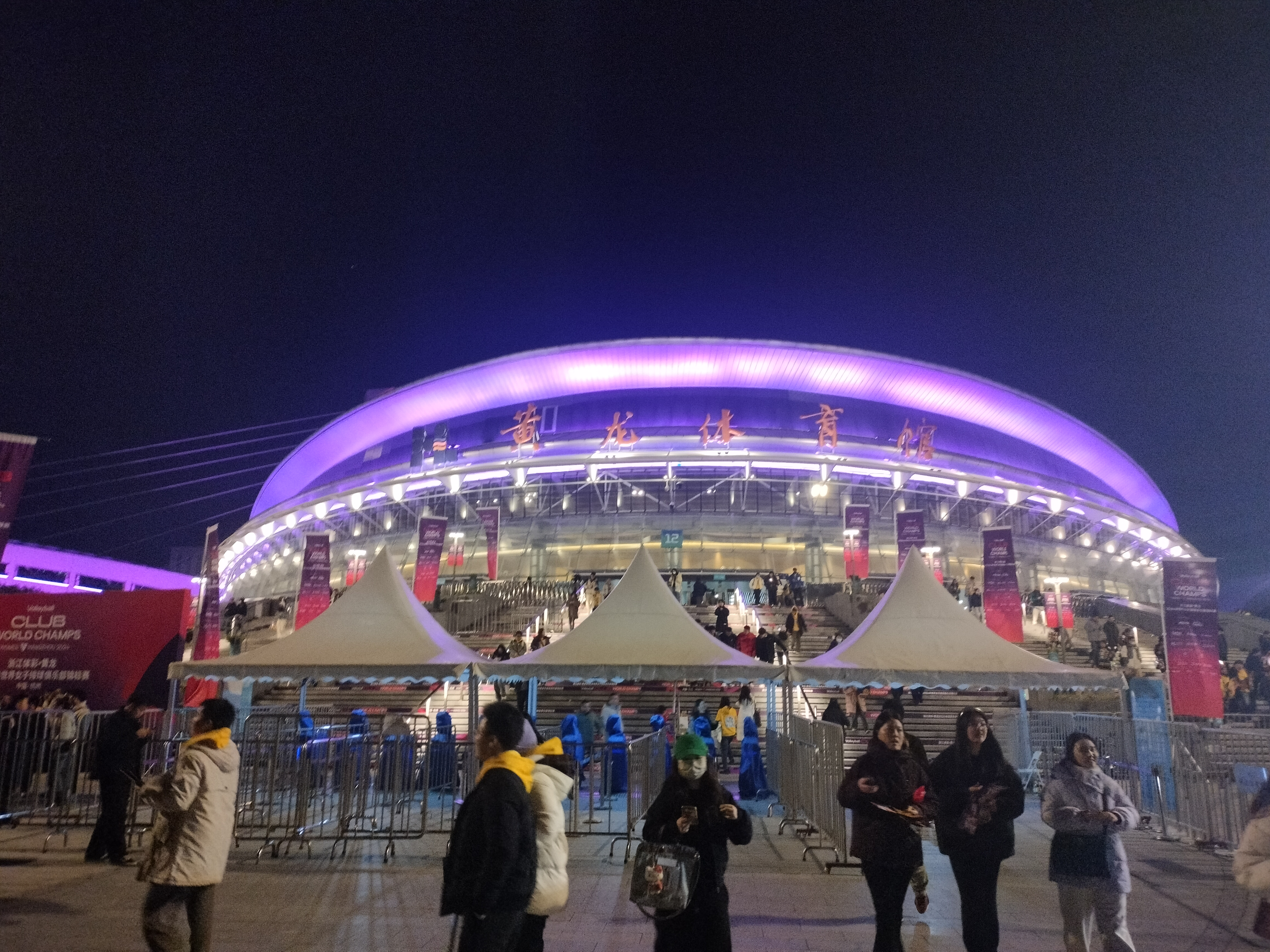

== Format ==
Eight participating teams are divided into two pools of four teams each in a round-robin match. The top two teams of each pool advance to the semifinals (Pool A winner vs. Pool B runner-up and the Pool B winner vs. Pool A runner-up). The winners of the two semifinals advance to the gold medal match and the losers to the bronze medal match.

== Pool standing procedure ==
1. Number of victories
2. Match points
3. Sets ratio
4. Points ratio
5. Result of the last match between the tied teams.

Match won 3–0 or 3–1: 3 match points for the winner and 0 match point for the loser.

Match won 3–2: 2 match points for the winner and 1 match point for the loser.

== Preliminary round ==
- All times are China Standard Time (UTC+08:00).

=== Pool A ===
Pos	Team	Pld	W	L	Pts	SW	SL	SR	SPW	SPL	SPR	Qualification
1	(China) Tianjin Bohai Bank	3	3	0	9	9	0	MAX	225	178	1.264	Semifinals
2	(Italy) Numia Vero Volley Milano	3	2	1	6	6	3	2.000	218	179	1.218	Semifinals
3	(Brazil) Gerdau Minas	3	1	2	3	3	6	0.500	202	204	0.990	
4	(Egypt) Zamalek SC	3	0	3	0	0	9	0.000	141	225	0.627	

Source: FIVB

Date	Time		Score		Set 1	Set 2	Set 3	Set 4	Set 5	Total	Report
17 Dec	09:00	Gerdau Minas (Brazil)	0–3	(Italy) Numia Vero Volley Milano	17–25	22–25	25–27			64–77	P2 Report
17 Dec	19:30	Tianjin Bohai Bank (China)	3–0	(Egypt) Zamalek SC	25–16	25–18	25–15			75–49	P2 Report
18 Dec	12:30	Gerdau Minas (Brazil)	3–0	(Egypt) Zamalek SC	25–17	25–21	25–14			75–52	P2 Report
18 Dec	19:30	Tianjin Bohai Bank (China)	3–0	(Italy) Numia Vero Volley Milano	25–21	25–22	25–23			75–66	P2 Report
19 Dec	19:30	Numia Vero Volley Milano (Italy)	3–0	(Egypt) Zamalek SC	25–9	25–13	25–18			75–40	P2 Report
20 Dec	19:30	Tianjin Bohai Bank (China)	3–0	(Brazil) Gerdau Minas	25–19	25–22	25–22			75–63	P2 Report

=== Pool B ===
Pos	Team	Pld	W	L	Pts	SW	SL	SR	SPW	SPL	SPR	Qualification
1	(Italy) Prosecco Doc Imoco Conegliano	3	3	0	9	9	0	MAX	225	149	1.510	Semifinals
2	(Brazil) Dentil Praia Clube	3	2	1	6	6	3	2.000	200	175	1.143	Semifinals
3	(Japan) NEC Red Rockets Kawasaki	3	1	2	3	3	6	0.500	191	196	0.974	
4	(Vietnam) LP Bank Ninh Bình	3	0	3	0	0	9	0.000	129	225	0.573	

Source: FIVB

Date	Time		Score		Set 1	Set 2	Set 3	Set 4	Set 5	Total	Report
17 Dec	12:30	Prosecco Doc Imoco Conegliano (Italy)	3–0	(Brazil) Dentil Praia Clube	25–20	25–15	25–15			75–50	P2 Report
17 Dec	16:00	NEC Red Rockets Kawasaki (Japan)	3–0	(Vietnam) LP Bank Ninh Bình	25–18	25–15	25–13			75–46	P2 Report
18 Dec	09:00	Prosecco Doc Imoco Conegliano (Italy)	3–0	(Vietnam) LP Bank Ninh Bình	25–16	25–8	25–15			75–39	P2 Report
18 Dec	16:00	NEC Red Rockets Kawasaki (Japan)	0–3	(Brazil) Dentil Praia Clube	17–25	23–25	16–25			56–75	P2 Report
19 Dec	15:00	LP Bank Ninh Bình (Vietnam)	0–3	(Brazil) Dentil Praia Clube	15–25	17–25	12–25			44–75	P2 Report
20 Dec	15:00	Prosecco Doc Imoco Conegliano (Italy)	3–0	(Japan) NEC Red Rockets Kawasaki	25–21	25–20	25–19			75–60	P2 Report

== Final round ==
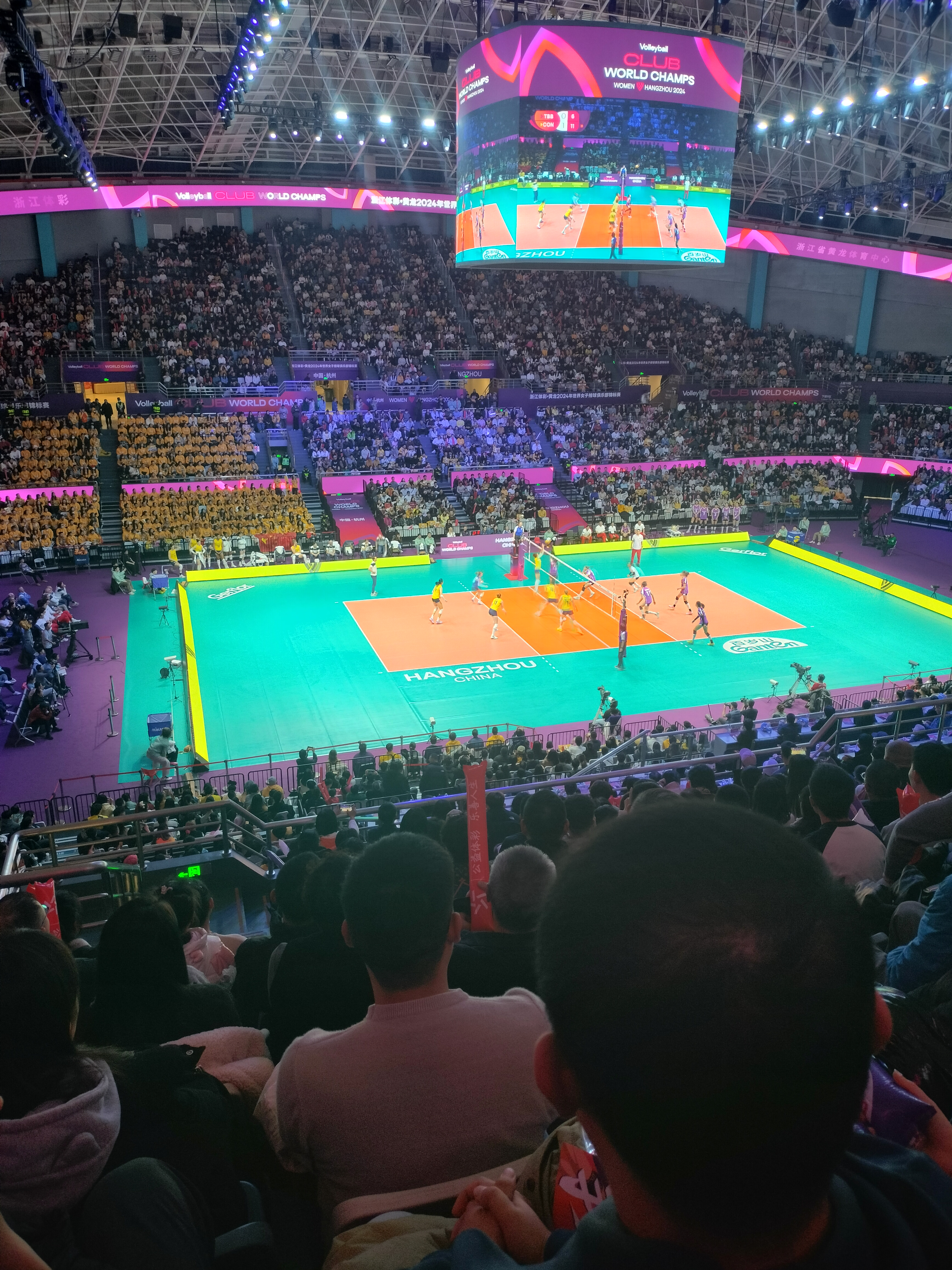
Tianjin–Conegliano

- All times are China Standard Time (UTC+08:00).

Semi-finals
21 December
(China) Tianjin	3
(Brazil) Praia	1
21 December
(Italy) Conegliano	3
(Italy) Milano	0

Final
22 December
(China) Tianjin	0
(Italy) Conegliano	3
Third Place Match
22 December
(Brazil) Praia	0
(Italy) Milano	3

=== Semi-finals ===
Date	Time		Score		Set 1	Set 2	Set 3	Set 4	Set 5	Total	Report
21 Dec	15:00	Tianjin Bohai Bank (China)	3–1	(Brazil) Dentil Praia Clube	25–23	25–21	24–26	25–22		99–92	P2 Report
21 Dec	19:30	Prosecco Doc Imoco Conegliano (Italy)	3–0	(Italy) Numia Vero Volley Milano	25–23	25–14	25–23			75–60	P2 Report

=== Third Place Match ===
Date	Time		Score		Set 1	Set 2	Set 3	Set 4	Set 5	Total	Report
22 Dec	15:00	Dentil Praia Clube (Brazil)	0–3	(Italy) Numia Vero Volley Milano	23–25	16–25	13–25			52–75	P2 Report

=== Final ===
Date	Time		Score		Set 1	Set 2	Set 3	Set 4	Set 5	Total	Report
22 Dec	19:30	Tianjin Bohai Bank (China)	0–3	(Italy) Prosecco Doc Imoco Conegliano	21–25	15–25	20–25			56–75	P2 Report

== Final standing ==
Rank	Team
1st place, gold medalist(s)	(Italy) Prosecco Doc Imoco Conegliano
2nd place, silver medalist(s)	(China) Tianjin Bohai Bank
3rd place, bronze medalist(s)	(Italy) Numia Vero Volley Milano
4	(Brazil) Dentil Praia Clube
5	(Brazil) Gerdau Minas
6	(Japan) NEC Red Rockets Kawasaki
7	(Egypt) Zamalek SC
8	(Vietnam) LP Bank Ninh Bình

2024 Club World champions
(Italy)
Prosecco Doc Imoco Conegliano
Third title

Team
Gabriela Guimarães, Zhu Ting, Nanami Seki, Katja Eckl, Marina Lubian, Monica De Gennaro, Isabelle Haak, Joanna Wołosz (c), Merit Adigwe, Khalia Lanier, Martyna Łukasik, Cristina Chirichella, Sarah Luisa Fahr, Anna Bardaro
Coach
(Italy) Daniele Santarelli

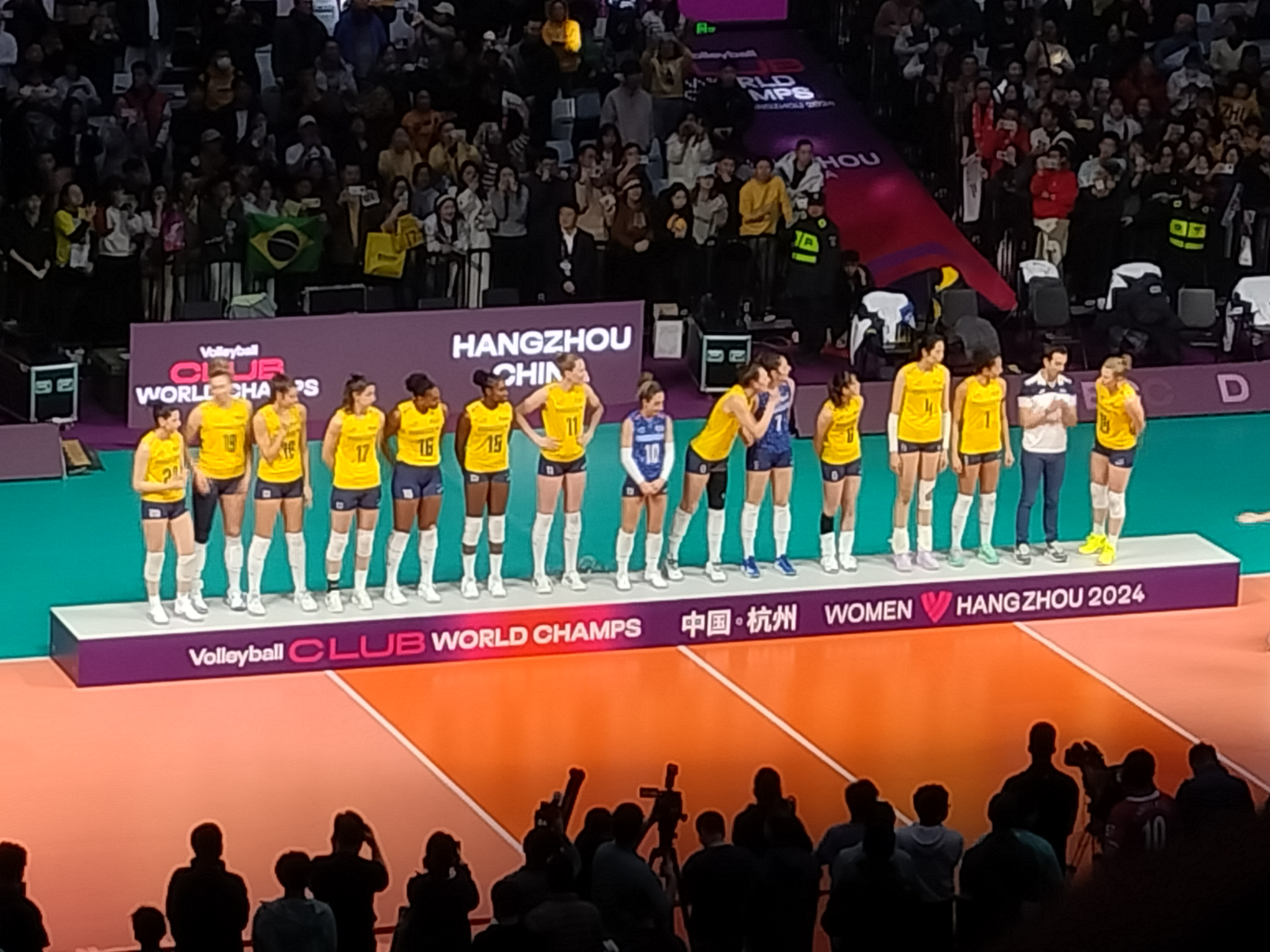
champion

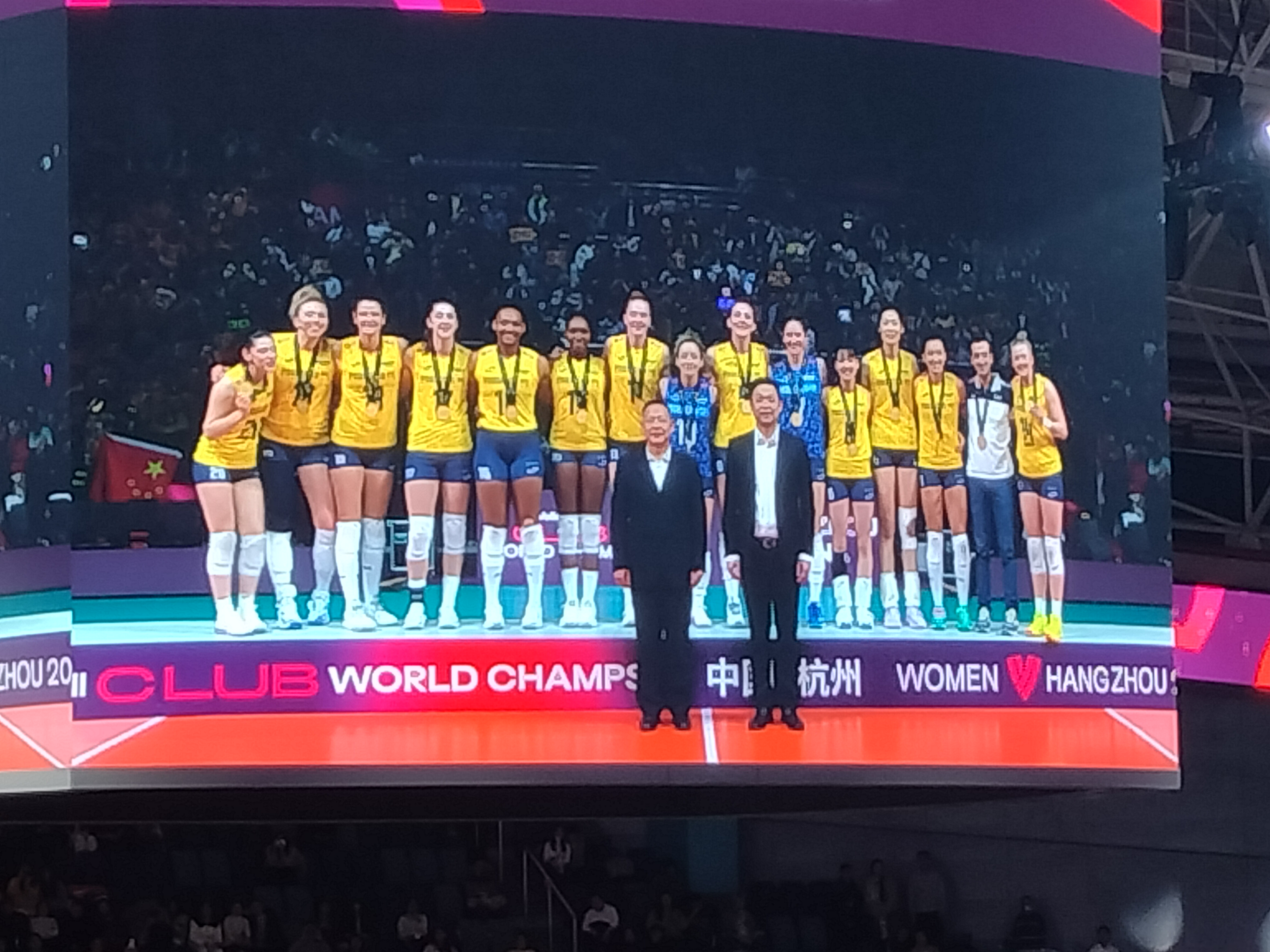

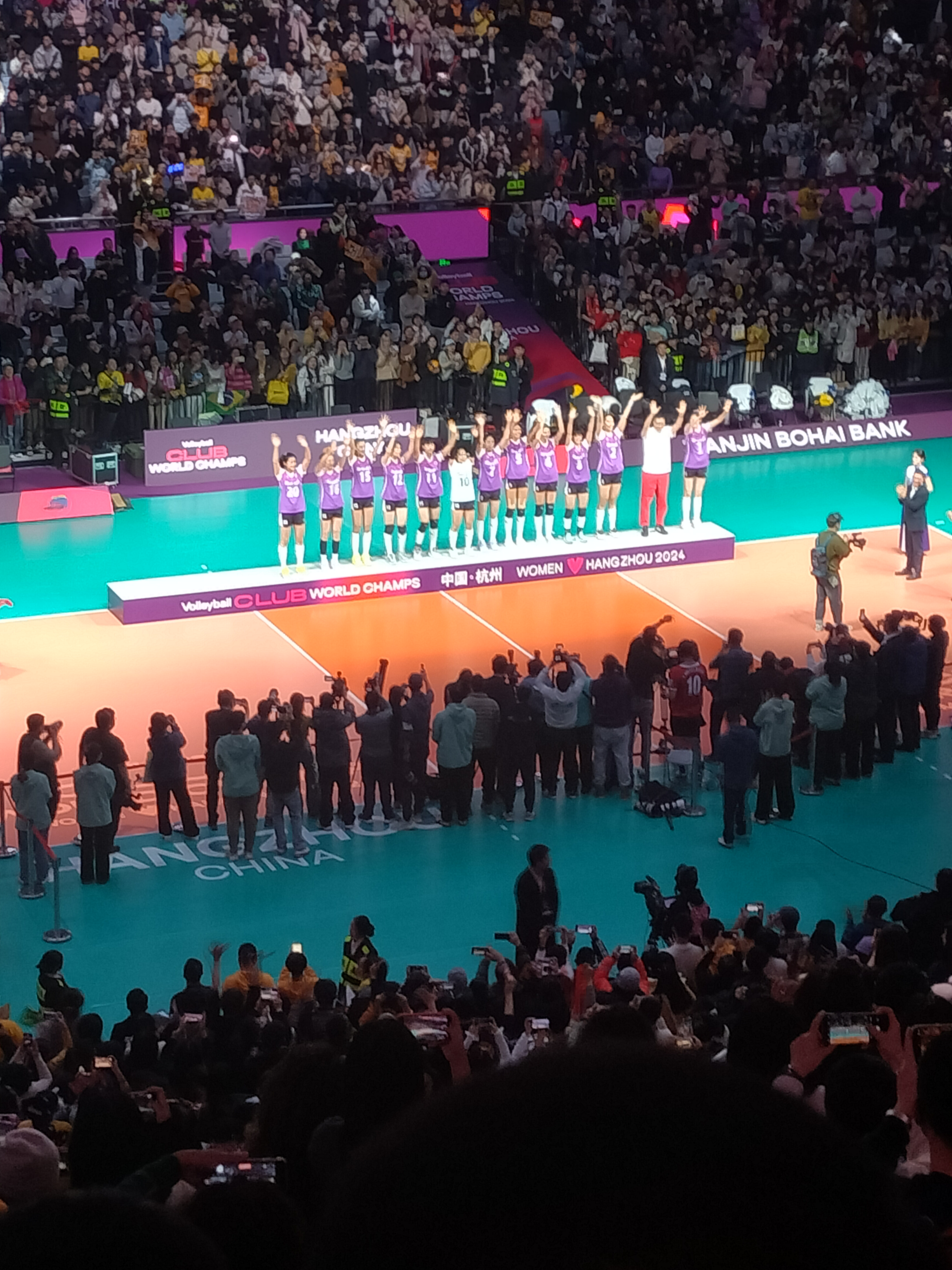
runner-up

== Awards ==
Hangzhou 2024 Dream Team:

- Most valuable player
  (Sweden) Isabelle Haak
- Best setter
  (Poland) Joanna Wolosz
- Best outside spikers
  (China) Li Yingying
  (China) Zhu Ting
- Best middle blockers
  (Serbia) Hena Kurtagić
  (Italy) Sarah Luisa Fahr
- Best opposite spiker
  (Sweden) Isabelle Haak
- Best libero
  (China) Liu Liwen
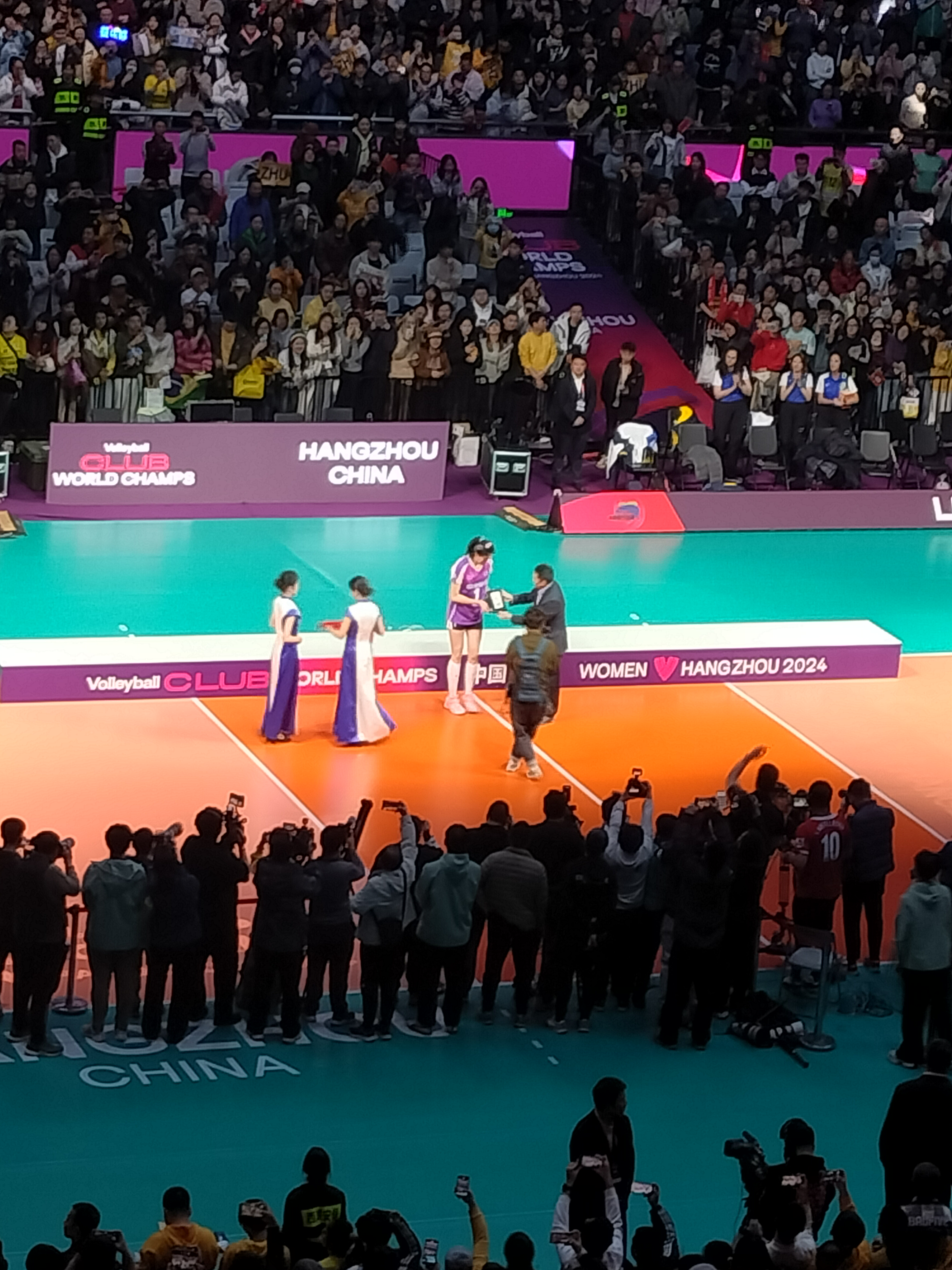
Best outside spikers Li Yingying

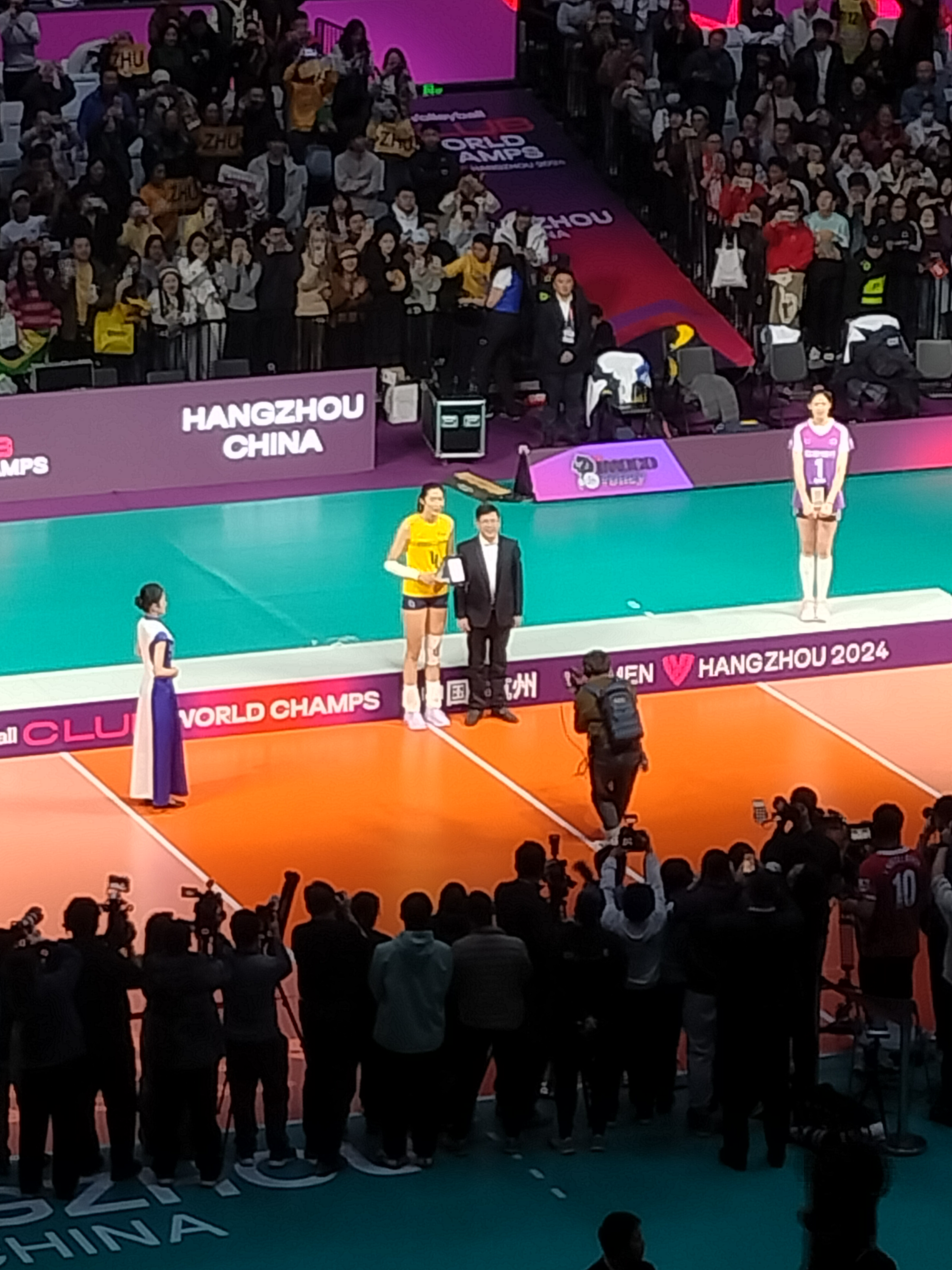
Best outside spikers Zhu Ting

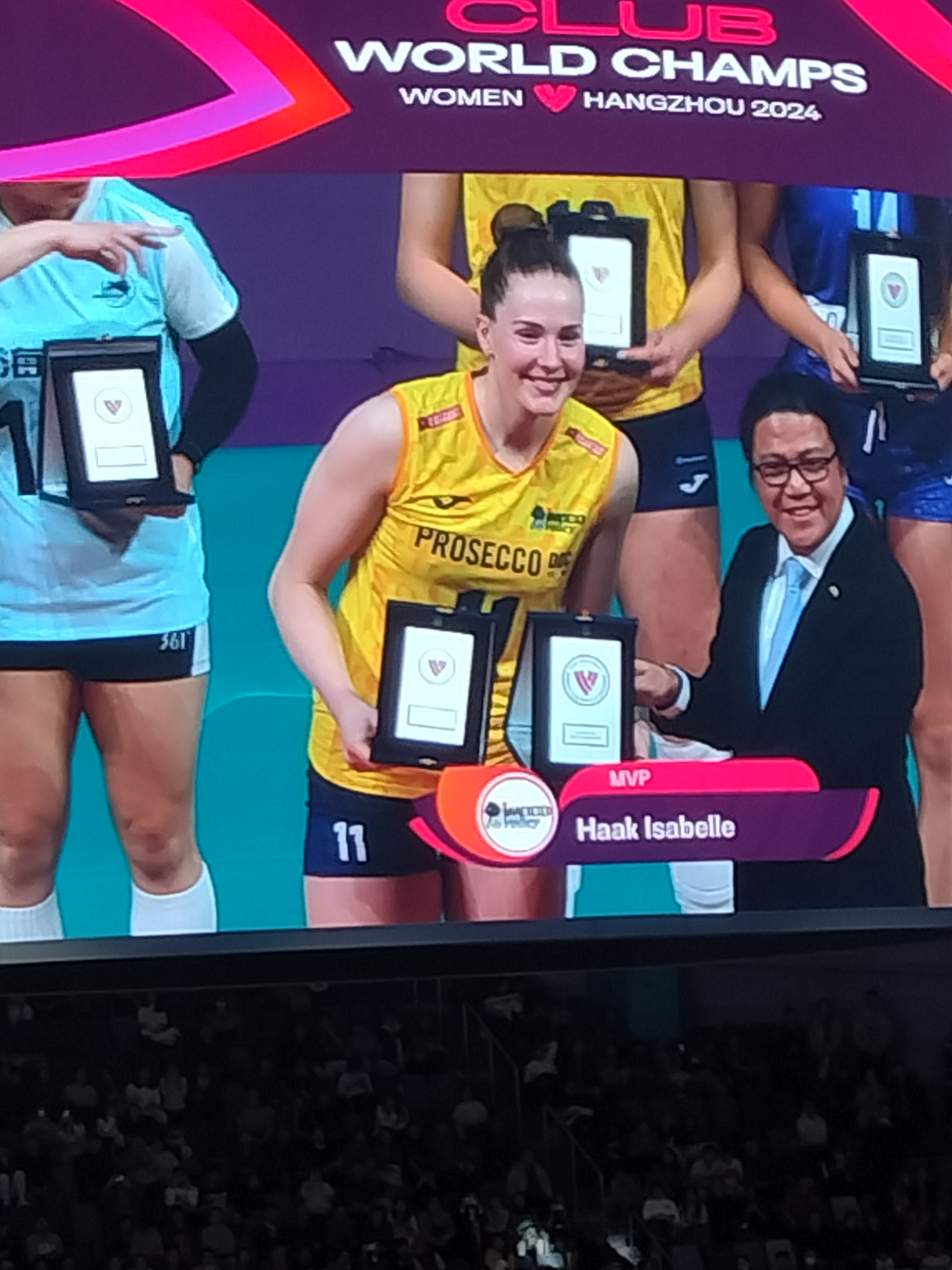
MVP Isabelle Haak

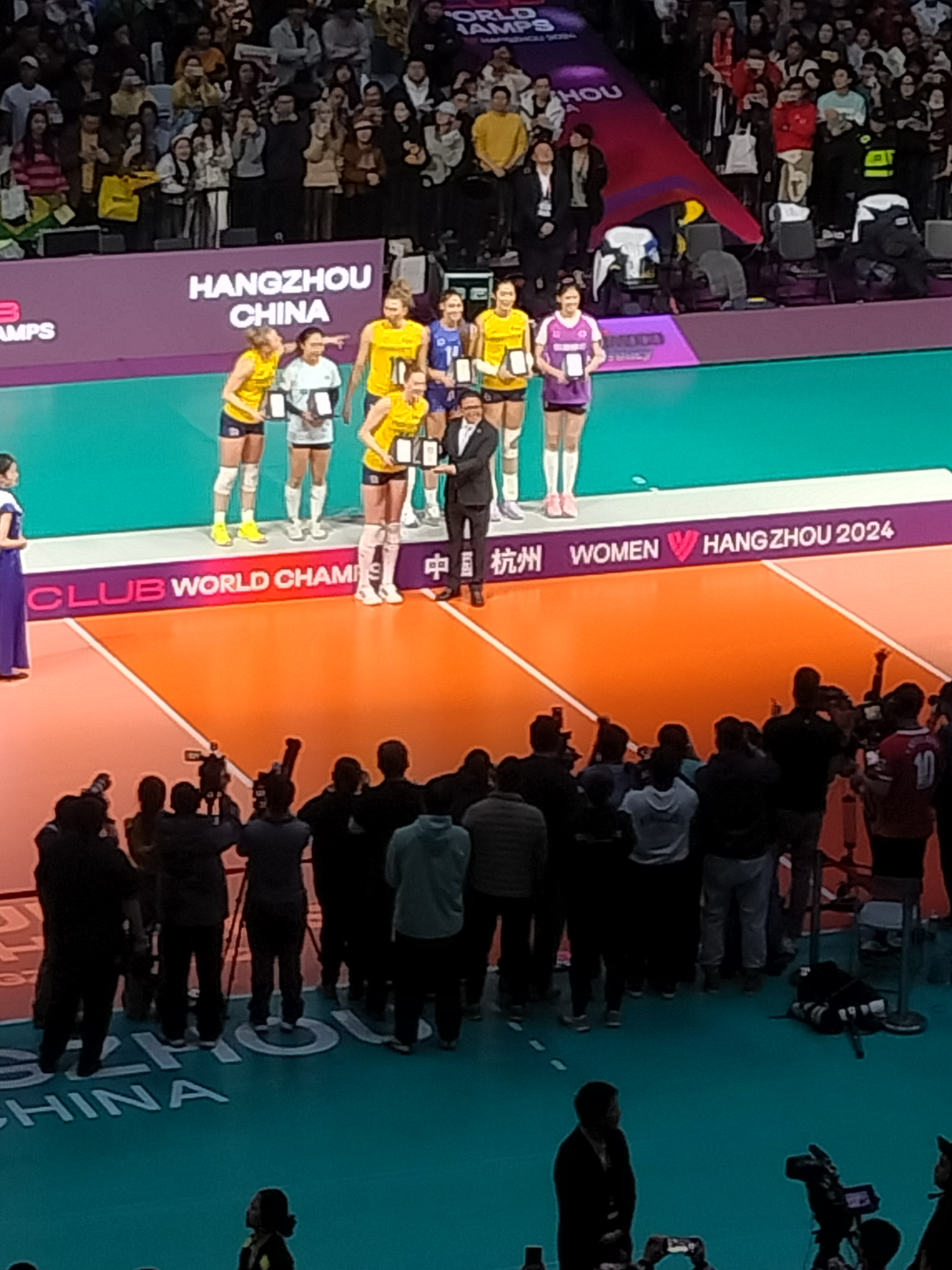
Best squad

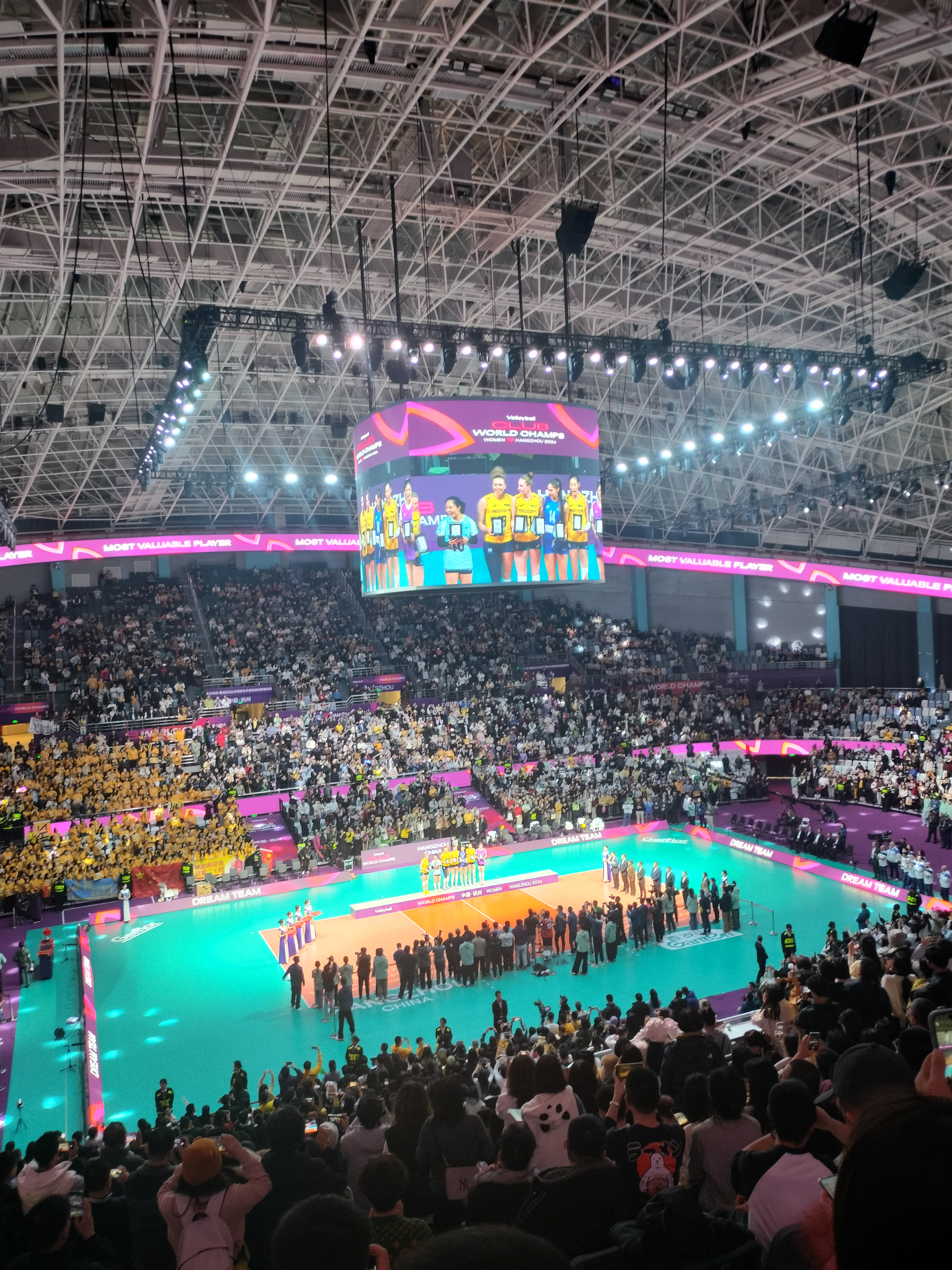
Group photo

== See also ==
- 2024 FIVB Volleyball Men's Club World Championship
