= 2019–20 Al Ahly (basketball) season =

Al Ahly SC
2019–20 season
- President: Mahmoud El Khatib
- Head coach: Hosny Elgarhy
- Arena: Al Ahly Sports Hall
- Egyptian Basketball Super League: Semi-final (On going)
- Egyptian Basketball Mortabat League: Third Place
- Egypt Basketball Cup: Final (On going)
Home	Away

== Egyptian Super League ==
Pos	Team	Pld	W	L	PF	PA	PD	Qualification or relegation
1	Al Ittihad	14	12	2	1176	989	+187	Qualification to playoffs
2	Al Ahly	14	11	3	1089	981	+108	Qualification to playoffs
3	Gezira	14	10	4	1143	991	+152	Qualification to playoffs
4	Sporting	14	7	7	1066	1095	−29	Qualification to playoffs
5	Zamalek	14	7	7	1066	1059	+7	Qualification to playoffs
6	Smouha	14	6	8	1088	1150	−62	Qualification to playoffs
7	Masr Lel Taamen	14	2	12	920	1119	−199	Qualification to playoffs
8	Tala'ea El Gaish	14	1	13	906	1070	−164	Qualification to playoffs

Updated to match(es) played on 25 August 2020. Source:

=== Matches ===
21 December 2019 1	Al Ahly	79–61	Tala'ea El Gaish	Cairo
18:00
				Arena: Al Ahly Sports Hall

24 December 2019 2	Al Ahly	82–68	Zamalek	Cairo
18:00
				Arena: Al Ahly Sports Hall

27 December 2019 3	Gezira	82–86	Al Ahly	Cairo
18:00
				Arena: Cairo Stadium Indoor Halls Complex

30 December 2019 4	Al Ahly	66–75	Sporting	Cairo
18:00
				Arena: Al Ahly Sports Hall

2 January 2020 5	Smouha	81–84	Al Ahly	Alexandria
18:00
				Arena: Smouha Hall

5 January 2019 6	Al Ahly	76–78	Al Ittihad	Cairo
18:00
				Arena: Al Ahly Sports Hall

9 January 2020 7	Masr Lel Tameen	65–83	Al Ahly	Cairo
19:00
				Arena: Cairo Stadium Indoor Halls Complex

12 January 2020 8	Tala'ea El Gaish	64–71	Al Ahly	Cairo
19:00
				Arena: Tala'ea El Gaish Hall

15 January 2020 9	Zamalek	83–93	Al Ahly	Giza
19:00
				Arena: Abdelrahman Fawzy Hall

18 January 2019 10	Al Ahly	71–64	Gezira	Cairo
18:00
				Arena: Al Ahly Sports Hall

15 January 2020 11	Sporting	67–81	Al Ahly	Alexandria
19:00
				Arena: Sporting Club Hall

9 February 2020 12	Al Ahly	79–77	Smouha	Cairo
18:00

12 February 2020 13	Al Ittihad	60–64	Al Ahly	Alexandria
17:00

16 February 2020 14	Masr Lel Tameen	54–76	Al Ahly	Cairo
17:00

== Egypt Cup ==
5 November 2019 Round Of 16	Al Ahly	92–80	Zamalek	Cairo
18:00
				Arena: Al Ahly Sports Hall

20 March 2020 Quarter Final (Note: El Shams Forfited)	Al Ahly	20–0	El Shams	Cairo
18:00

23 August 2020 Semi Final	Al Ahly	77–69	Alexandria Sporting	Cairo
20:30	Scoring by quarter: 27-15, 18-17, 18-22, 14-15

25 August 2020 Final	Al Ahly	vs.	Al Ittihad	Cairo
20:30
