= Zamalek SC (water polo) =

- Full name: Zamalek Sporting Club
- League: Egyptian league
- Based in: Giza, Egypt
- Arena: Zamalek pool
- Colors: Red and white
- Owner: Zamalek SC 100%
- Chairman: (Egypt) Hussien Labib
- Championships: 6 × Egyptian league 6 × Egypt cup 1 × Water polo Arab Clubs Championship
- Website: http://www.el-zamalek.com/

Zamalek water polo team (Arabic: نادي الزمالك الرياضي), commonly known as Zamalek S.C, often referred to as Zamalek Pool Club is one of Zamalek SC club's sections that represent the club in Egypt and international water polo competitions, the club team section based in Giza.

== Honors ==
=== National achievements ===
- Egyptian League:

Winners (6 titles):

- Egyptian Cup:

Winners (6 titles):

=== Regional achievements ===
- Water polo Arab Clubs Championship

Winners : 1988
