= Safwan Thabet =

Egyptian businessman (born 1946)

Safwan Thabet (Arabic: صفوان أحمد ثابت السميري; born 1946) is an Egyptian businessman, and founder of the dairy company Juhayna Food Industries. Safwan Thabet is the grandson of the Egyptian Muslim Brotherhood's second leader Hassan al-Hudaybi (son of his daughter), who led the group during the Nasser era and nephew of Ma'mun al-Hudaybi, the Sixth General Guide of the Brotherhood between 2002 and 2004.

== Arrest ==
Thabet has had his assets frozen by the Egyptian courts since 2015 (except those in Juhayna since it is a publicly listed company) and was arrested in December 2020 on accusations of funding a terrorist group. The Egyptian public prosecution estimated his assets in 2015 to be around seven billion Egyptian pounds, roughly equaling US$900 million at the time. After his arrest, his son Seif started managing the company, before being arrested too in February 2021. Despite his arrest, Thabet and his family were able to still remain in control of the dairy company through a convoluted schema of ownership and internal net of employees all affiliated to the family. Thabet and his son were released in January 2023.
