= Al Ahly (women's volleyball) =

Egyptian volleyball club

Al Ahly SC Women's volleyball
- Full name: Al Ahly SC
- Founded: 1940s
- Ground: Al Ahly Sports Hall (Capacity: 2500)
- Chairman: (Egypt) Mahmoud El Khatib
- Manager: (Brazil) Paulo Milagres
- Captain: (Egypt) Shorook Fouad
- League: (Egypt) Egyptian Volleyball League
- 2025–26: 1st place
- Website: Club home page

Uniforms
Home	Away

Al Ahly Women's Volleyball Club (Arabic: النادي الاهلي للكرة الطائرة للسيدات) is a part of Al Ahly SC club, which represents the club in Egypt and in major international volleyball competitions. The club has been based in Cairo since the 1940s.

The club broke many records and is the most crowned team in Egypt with a total of 79 titles including 42 league titles and 37 Egyptian Cups. Additionally, the club holds a record in Africa as the most crowned team with the eleventh African clubs Championship and eight African Winner's Cup internationally. The club is the only team to surpass 40 domestic titles and 30 domestic cups.

== Honours ==
=== National achievements ===
- Egyptian League :

Winners 42 titles (Record) : 1983–84, 1984–85, 1985–86, 1986–87, 1987–88, 1988–89, 1989–90, 1990–91, 1991–92, 1992–93, 1993–94, 1995–96, 1996–97, 1997–98, 1998–99, 1999–00, 2000–01, 2001–02, 2002–03, 2003–04, 2004–05, 2005–06, 2006–07, 2007–08, 2008–09, 2009–10, 2010–11, 2011–12, 2012–13, 2013–14, 2014–15, 2015–16, 2016–17, 2017–18, 2018–19, 2019–20, 2020–21, 2021–22, 2022–23, 2023–24, 2024–25, 2025–26

- Egyptian Cup :

Winners 37 titles (Record) : 1986–87, 1987–88, 1988–89, 1989–90, 1990–91, 1991–92, 1992–93, 1993–94, 1995–96, 1996–97, 1997–98, 1998–99, 1999–00, 2000–01, 2002–03, 2003–04, 2004–05, 2005–06, 2006–07, 2007–08, 2008–09, 2009–10, 2010–11, 2011–12, 2012–13, 2013–14, 2014–15, 2015–16, 2016–17, 2017–18, 2018–19, 2019–20, 2020–21, 2021–22, 2023–24, 2025–26

- Egyptian Mortabat League :

Winners 1 titles (Record) : 2025–26

- Egyptian Super Cup :

Winners 4 titles (Record) : 2023, 2024, 2025, 2026

=== International achievements ===
- Women's African Clubs Championship :

Winners 11 titles (Record) : 1990, 1999, 2000, 2003, 2007, 2009, 2015, 2016, 2018, 2019,2026

- Women's African Cup Winners' Cup :

Winners 8 titles (Record) : 1989, 1990, 1991, 1993, 1995, 1996, 1998, 1999

=== Regional achievements ===
- Women's Arab Clubs Championship :

Winners 8 titles (Record) : 1998, 1999, 2000, 2005, 2007, 2009, 2016, 2017

== Sports Hall information ==
The club plays in Al Ahly Sports Hall in Cairo, with a capacity of 2,500 spectators.

== Current squad ==
Team roster — season 2023/2024
Al Ahly Volleyball Team
Num	Player	Position	D.O.B	Height(cm)	weight(KG)	Spike	Block
1	(Egypt) Aya El Shamey	Opposite spiker	27 Nov 1995	183	79	290	270
18	(Egypt) Aliaa Hany	Opposite spiker		179	71	300	290
#	(Egypt) Mariam Tharwat	Setter		184	75	288	276
9	(Egypt) Shrouq Foaud	Setter	20 Jan 1992	174	75	280	270
6	(Egypt) Doaa Mohamed	Setter		180	73	280	280
12	(Puerto Rico) Diana Reyes	Middle blocker	29 Apr 1993	191	80	303	291
12	(Egypt) Mai Ghazal	Middle blocker		180	75	290	280
20	(Egypt) Aya Khaled	Middle blocker		186	84	300	290
8	(Egypt) Nahla Sameh (C)	Outside hitter	21 Jan 1990	??	??	??	??
#	(Egypt) Sara Amin	Outsude Hitter	15 April 1997	178	73	265	255
#	(Egypt) Zeina Elalamy	Outside hitter	??	??	??	??	??
14	(Egypt) Doaa Elgobashy	Outside hitter	9 Nov 1996	175	70	270	250
5	(Puerto Rico) Karina Ocasio	Outside hitter	1 Aug 1985	192	72	298 cm	288 cm
2	(Egypt) Nada Waleed	Libro	21 Jan 2000	170	65		

== Technical and managerial staff ==
Name	Role	Nationality
Paulo Milagres	Head coach	Brazilian
Yasser Salah	Assistant Coach	Egyptian
	Technical analyst	Egyptian
	Team Manager	Egyptian
	Assistant Team manager	Egyptian
	Physiotherapist	Egyptian
	Masseur	Egyptian

== Kit manufacturers and shirt sponsors ==
Period	Kit supplier	Shirt sponsors
2006–2009	(Germany) Puma	(United Kingdom) Vodafone / (Egypt) Juhayna / (United States) Chevrolet / (United States) Coca-Cola
2009–2011	(Germany) Adidas	(United Kingdom) Vodafone / (Egypt) Juhayna / (United States) Chevrolet / (United States) Coca-Cola
2011–2015	(Germany) Adidas	(United Arab Emirates) Etisalat / (Egypt) Juhayna / (United States) Chevrolet
2015–2017	(Italy) Diadora	(United Kingdom) Vodafone / (Egypt) Juhayna / (China) Huawei / (Egypt) Egyptian Steel / (United Kingdom) Shell Helix / (United States) Domino's
2017–2018	(Germany) Hummel	(United Kingdom) Vodafone / (Egypt) Juhayna / (China) Huawei / (Egypt) Egyptian Steel / (United Kingdom) Shell Helix / (United States) Domino's
2018–2019	(Germany) Hummel	(Egypt) TORNADO / (India) LAVA / (United Kingdom) Vodafone
2019–2020	(Spain) Kelme	(Egypt) WE / (Egypt) TIGER / (Egypt) GLC Paints / (United Kingdom) Shell Helix

== Notable players ==
- (Egypt) Doaa Elghobashy
- (Egypt) Tahany Toson
- (Egypt) Hannaa Hamza
- (Egypt) Sara Talaat
- (Egypt) Shrihan Sameh
- (Egypt) Mona Abdel Karem
- (Egypt) Lana Alsabban
- (Egypt) Doaa Mohamed
- (Egypt) Sara Amin
- (Egypt) Ingy El Shami
- (Kenya) Violet Makuto
- (Brazil) Thaynara Emmel Roxo
- (Brazil) Paula Mohr
- (Brazil) Natália Fernandes
- (Ukraine) Kateryna Silchenkova
- (Ukraine) Bogdana Anisova
- (Puerto Rico) Diana Reyes
- (Puerto Rico) Karina Ocasio
- (Montenegro) Tatjana Bokan
- (France) Aurélia Ebatombo

== Club Presidents ==
No	Period	Name	From	To
1	1st	(England) Mitchel Ince	1907	1908
2	1st	(Egypt) Aziz Ezzat Pacha	1908	1916
3	1st	(Egypt) Abdelkhaleq Tharwat Pacha	1916	1924
4	1st	(Egypt) Gaafar Waly Pacha	1924	1940
5	1st	(Egypt) Mohamed Taher Pacha	1940	1941
6	2nd	(Egypt) Gaafar Waly Pacha	1941	1944
7	1st	(Egypt) Ahmed Hasanein Pacha	1944	1946
8	1st	(Egypt) Ahmed Aboud Pacha	1946	1961
9	1st	(Egypt) Salah Desouky Sheshtawy	1961	1965
10	1st	(Egypt) Abdelmohsen Kamel Mortagy	1965	1967
11	1st	(Egypt) Ibrahim El Wakil	1967	1972
12	2nd	(Egypt) Abdelmohsen Kamel Mortagy	1972	1980
13	1st	(Egypt) Saleh Selim	1980	1988
14	1st	(Egypt) Mohamed Abdou Saleh El Wahsh	1988	1992
15	2nd	(Egypt) Saleh Selim	1992	2002
16	1st	(Egypt) Hassan Hamdy	2002	2014
17	1st	(Egypt) Mahmoud Taher	2014	2017
18	1st	(Egypt) Mahmoud El Khatib	2017	Present

== See also ==
- Al Ahly FC
- Al Ahly FC Women
- Al Ahly (volleyball)
- Al Ahly Women's Volleyball
- Al Ahly (basketball)
- Al Ahly Women's Basketball
- Al Ahly (handball)
- Al Ahly Women's Handball
- Al Ahly (table tennis)
- Al Ahly (water polo)
- Port Said Stadium riot
- Al-Ahly TV
