= Zamalek SC Table Tennis =

Egyptian table tennis club of Al-Zamalek

Zamalek SC
- Full name: Zamalek Sporting Club
- League: Egyptian Table Tennis League
- Based in: Giza, Egypt
- Home ground: The Covered Hall (Abdelrahman Fawzy)
- Colors: Red and white
- Chairman: Hussein Labib
- Championships: Egyptian league (10); Arab table tennis championship (4)
- 2020/21: 2nd Place
- Website: http://www.el-zamalek.com/

Zamalek Tennis Table Club (Arabic: نادي الزمالك الرياضي), commonly known as Zamalek S.C, often referred to as) is one of Zamalek SC club's sections that represent the club in Egypt and international Table tennis competitions, the club team section based in Giza.

== Honors ==
=== National titles ===
- Egyptian Table Tennis League

Winners (10 titles): 1986-87 ,1987-88, 1989-90, 1994-95, 1999-00, 2000-01, 2001-02, 2004-05, 2005-06, 2008-09

=== Regional titles ===
- Arab table tennis championship

Winners (4 titles): 1991, 2001, 2005, 2006

== See also ==
- Zamalek SC
- Zamalek SC Handball
- Zamalek SC Volleyball
- Zamalek SC Basketball
