= Wadi Group =

Egyptian agribusiness conglomerate

Wadi Group وادي جروب
- Company type: Private company
- Industry: Agribusiness
- Founder: Tony Freiji
- Headquarters: Giza, Egypt
- Key people: Tony Freiji (CEO)
- Revenue: USD 350 million (2023)
- Website: Official website

Wadi Group (Egyptian Arabic: وادى جروب), is an Egyptian agribusiness conglomerate. It is headquartered in Giza, Egypt. Wadi Group is a family-owned business operating in the agribusiness sector, comprising 12 companies. The company is involved in poultry production, animal feed manufacturing, and agro-food processing.

The Mazareh sector includes the poultry and agro-food divisions, with key business-to-business companies such as Katkoot al Wadi and A'laf al Wadi, as well as business-to-consumer brands including Wadi Food and Wadi Farms. The Sina’at sector comprises the group's industrial subsidiaries, including Wadi Glass (now known as Zugag), Tabreed, and other industrial projects such as Idafat, Asmida, and Tawseel.

Wadi Group is the largest egg-producing company in Egypt and the African continent, operating with a flock of 10 million hens.

== History ==
Wadi Group was founded in 1984 by a Lebanese family of poultry farmers, tracing its origins to 1957 when the eldest brother began working in the poultry industry in Lebanon. The outbreak of the Lebanese Civil War forced the family to flee the country, seeking refuge in neighboring countries. Tony Freiji, who later established Wadi Group, settled in Egypt three decades ago.

In 2023 Japanese conglomerate Mitsui & Co. acquired an undisclosed stake in Wadi Poultry, a subsidiary of Wadi Group. Wadi Poultry operates in food production, poultry processing, and animal feed sectors. The investment, in partnership with another Japanese company, Prifoods, aims to expand integrated poultry production, from feed procurement to distribution, focusing on Japan and Asian markets.

In December 2024, Wadi Food, a subsidiary of Wadi Group, set a Guinness World Record for the longest rotating chicken grill during its fifth annual Olive Harvest Festival. The grill measured 62.8 meters and could cook 390 chickens simultaneously. The event, held at the company's farm along the Cairo–Alexandria desert road, celebrated Wadi Food's contributions to Egypt's olive oil industry and agricultural sector.

== Business model ==
The business remains family-owned, with management shared between two extended Lebanese families, the Freijis and Nasrallahs. The company introduced a "family council" that manages communication between business operations and over 45 family members. The council is part of broader corporate governance reforms implemented with guidance from the International Finance Corporation.

While poultry continues to be the company's primary focus, Wadi Group has diversified into multiple sectors, including large-scale feed manufacturing, logistics, olive oil production, and the cultivation of fresh vegetables and fruits for export. As of 2014 Wadi Group operated across seven industries and employed over 3,500 people, maintaining a significant presence in Egypt and Sudan.

== Subsidiaries ==
=== Wadi Food ===
Wadi Food is the original venture, from which Wadi Group later emerged. It began with olive groves covering 30 hectares located about 85 kilometers south of Alexandria. As of 2015, the company produced 10,000 metric tons of pickled olives and 1,000 metric tons of olive oil annually for local and international markets. Over time, Wadi Food expanded its product range to include more than 100 items, primarily in the organic food sector. The company also exports its products to international markets, including the Gulf States, Canada, the United States, and Europe.

=== Rula for Land Reclamation ===
Wadi Group's subsidiary Rula for Land Reclamation operates a marine fish farm in Egypt's Western Desert, near Wadi El Natroun, approximately 80 kilometers from the Mediterranean Sea. The site was originally developed for olive cultivation using groundwater sources. However, one well yielded water with a high salinity of 26 grams per liter, much saltier than the mildly brackish water suitable for olives, making it unsuitable for traditional agriculture. To utilize this saline water, the company adapted the site to establish a marine aquaculture facility in the desert environment.

== See also ==
- Juhayna Food Industries
