= Water polo Arab Clubs Championship =

Water polo Arab Clubs Champions Championship
- Current season, competition or edition: 2018 Arab water polo Clubs Champions Championship
- Sport: Water polo
- Founded: 1988
- Most recent champion: (Egypt) Al Ahly SC (2025)
- Most titles: (Egypt) Al Ahly SC (8 titles)

The Arab Clubs Champions Championship is a sport competition for club Water polo teams, organized by the Arab water polo Association.

== Results ==
Year	Host	Final			Third place match		
Year	Host	Champion	Score	Runner-up	Third place	Score	Fourth place
1988; Details	Kuwait	(Egypt); Zamalek S.C	–			–	
1995; Details	(Syria); Damascus	(Egypt); Al Ahly SC	–			–	
1996; Details	(Lebanon); Beirut	(Egypt); Al Ahly SC	15-7	(Lebanon); Holidays Beaches	(Syria); Damascus Governate club	–	(Kuwait); Qadsia SC
1998; Details	(Egypt); Cairo	(Egypt); Al Ahly SC	9–6	(Morocco); Raja Casablanca	(Tunisia); Club Africain	–	(Lebanon); Holidays Beaches
2000; Details	(Egypt); Cairo	(Egypt); Al Ahly SC	–			–	
2002; Details	(Saudi Arabia); Jedda	(Saudi Arabia); Al Ahli	8–5	(Egypt); Al Ahly SC	(Kuwait); Qadsia SC	10–8	(Egypt); Zamalek SC
2004; Details	(Syria); Damascus	(Egypt); Al Ahly SC	7–4	(Saudi Arabia); Al Ahli	(Kuwait); Qadsia SC	11–7	(Syria); Damascus Governate Club
2005; Details	(Syria); Damascus	(Egypt); Al Ahly SC	8–5	(Egypt); Gezira SC	(Syria); Damascus Governate Club	10–8	(Saudi Arabia); Al-Ittihad Club
2006; Details	(Egypt); Cairo	(Egypt); Gezira SC	–	(Egypt); Al Ahly SC	(Kuwait); Qadsia SC	16–13	(Kuwait); Al-Arabi SC
2007; Details	(Egypt); Cairo	(Egypt); Al Ahly SC	–	(Kuwait); Qadsia SC	(Saudi Arabia); Al Ahli	-	(Tunisia); AS Marsa
2011; Details	Kuwait	(Saudi Arabia); Al-Qadsiah FC	7–6	(Egypt); Heliopolis SC	(Kuwait); Al-Arabi SC	–	
2013; Details	Qatar	(Egypt); Heliopolis SC	7-6	(Saudi Arabia); Al-Qadsiah FC	(Egypt); Gezira SC	-	(Saudi Arabia); Al Ahli
2016; Details	(Egypt); Cairo	(Saudi Arabia); Al-Qadsiah FC	8–6	(Egypt); Gezira SC		–	

=== By Club ===
Rank	Club	Winner	Runner-up	Total
1	(Egypt) Al Ahly SC	8	2	10
2	(Saudi Arabia) Al-Qadsiah FC	2	1	3
3	(Egypt) Gezira SC	1	2	3
4	(Egypt) Heliopolis SC	1	1	2
5	(Saudi Arabia) Al Ahli	1	1	2
6	(Egypt) Zamalek SC	1	0	1

=== By Country ===
Country	Winner
Egypt	11
Saudi Arabia	3
