= Arab Table Tennis Club Championship =

- Founded: 1989
- Country: Arab World
- Most recent champion: (Egypt) ENPPI SC (3rd title) (2024)
- Most titles: (Egypt) Al Ahly SC (21 Titles)

The Arab Table tennis Clubs Championship is a sport competition for table tennis clubs, currently held annually and organized by the Arab table tennis Association. it played for the first time in 1989.

== History ==
The Arab Table tennis Clubs Championship is a sport competition for table tennis clubs, currently held annually and organized by the Arab table tennis Association. it played for the first time in 1989.

== Results ==
Year	Host			
Year	Host	Champion	Second place	Third place
1989	(Syria); Damascus	(Iraq); Al-Rasheed SC	(Saudi Arabia); Al-Ittihad	(Egypt); Al Ahly SC
1990	(Egypt); Alexandria	(Egypt); Al Ahly SC	(Egypt); Zamalek S.C	(United Arab Emirates); Al Jazira Club
1991	(Egypt); Alexandria	(Egypt); Zamalek S.C	(Egypt); Al Ahly SC	(Saudi Arabia); Al Ahly KSA
1992	(Algeria); Algiers	(Egypt); Al Ahly SC	(Saudi Arabia); Al Ahly KSA	Tunisia Airlines club
1993	(Egypt); Cairo	(Egypt); Al Ahly SC	(Egypt); Zamalek S.C	(Tunisia); Grombalia tunisia
1994	(Egypt); Cairo	(Egypt); Al Ahly SC	(Tunisia); Grombalia tunisia	(Egypt); Zamalek S.C
1995	(Jordan); Amman	(Egypt); Al Ahly SC	(Egypt); Zamalek S.C	(Saudi Arabia); Al Ahly KSA
1996	(Lebanon); Beirut	(Egypt); Al Ahly SC	(Egypt); Zamalek S.C	(Saudi Arabia); Al Ahly KSA
1997	Morocco	(Egypt); Al Ahly SC	(Egypt); Zamalek S.C	(Kuwait); Al-Jahra SC
1998	(Lebanon); Jounieh	(Egypt); Al Ahly SC	(Egypt); Zamalek S.C	(Kuwait); Al-Jahra SC
1999	(Egypt); Cairo	(Egypt); Al Ahly SC	(Egypt); Zamalek S.C	Al-Arabi SC (Kuwait)
2000	(Lebanon); Beirut	(Qatar); Al-Rayyan SC	(Egypt); Zamalek S.C	(Saudi Arabia); Al Ahly KSA
2001	(Lebanon); Beirut	(Egypt); Zamalek S.C	(Qatar); Al-Rayyan SC	(Saudi Arabia); Al Ahly KSA
2002	(Egypt); Cairo	(Egypt); Al Ahly SC	(Qatar); Al Ahli SC (Doha)	Qatar SC
2003	(Egypt); Cairo	(Egypt); Al Ahly SC	(Egypt); Zamalek S.C	(Kuwait); Al-Salmiya SC
2004	(Yemen); Sana'a	(Egypt); Al Ahly SC	(Saudi Arabia); Al-Ittihad	(United Arab Emirates); Al-Nasr Dubai SC
2005	(Morocco); Rabat	(Egypt); Zamalek S.C	(Kuwait); Al-Salmiya SC	(Egypt); Al Ahly SC
2006	(Lebanon); Beirut	(Egypt); Zamalek S.C	(United Arab Emirates); Al-Nasr Dubai SC	(Egypt); Al Ahly SC
2007	(Jordan); Amman	(Egypt); Al Ahly SC	(Egypt); Zamalek S.C	(Kuwait); Al-Salmiya SC
2008	(Lebanon); Ghazir	(Kuwait); Al-Salmiya SC	(Egypt); Al Ahly SC	Al-Arabi SC (Qatar)
2009	(Morocco); Tétouan	(Egypt); Al Ahly SC	(Saudi Arabia); Al-Ittihad	(Kuwait); Al-Salmiya SC
2010	(Lebanon); Beirut	(Egypt); Al Ahly SC	(Saudi Arabia); Al-Ittihad	(Yemen); Al-Saqr SC
2011	(Jordan); Amman	(Saudi Arabia); Al-Ittihad	(Egypt); Al Ahly SC	(Saudi Arabia); Al Ahly KSA
2012	(Morocco); Marrakesh	(Saudi Arabia); Al-Ittihad	(Egypt); Al Ahly SC	(Lebanon); Al Ganoob tol
2013	(Jordan); Amman	(Egypt); Al Ahly SC	(Qatar); Al Sadd SC	(Kuwait); Al-Salmiya SC
2014	(Morocco); Agadir	(Egypt); Al Ahly SC	(Saudi Arabia); Al-Ittihad	(Egypt); Zamalek S.C
2015	(Egypt); Sharm; El Sheikh	(Saudi Arabia); Al-Ittihad	(Egypt); Al Ahly SC	(Iraq); Sulaymaniyah
2016	(Morocco); Agadir	(Egypt); Al Ahly SC	Bahrain SC	(Saudi Arabia); Al Ahly KSA
2017	(Lebanon); Ghazir	Qatar SC	(Qatar); Al Sadd SC	(Egypt); Maadi SC
2018	(Tunisia); Tunis	(Egypt); Al Ahly SC	Qatar SC	Bahrain SC
2019	(Morocco); Agadir	(Egypt); Al Ahly SC	Qatar SC	Bahrain SC
2020	canceled due to COVID-19 pandemic			
2021	(Jordan); Amman	(Egypt); Al Ahly SC	Qatar SC	(Bahrain); SAAR SC
2022	(Egypt); Cairo	(Egypt); ENPPI SC	Bahrain SC	Qatar SC
2023	(Saudi Arabia); Jeddah	(Egypt) ENPPI SC	(Saudi Arabia); Al-Ittihad	
2024	(Egypt); Cairo	(Egypt) ENPPI SC	(Saudi Arabia); Al-Ittihad	

== Winners by club ==
Rank	Club	Winners	Runners-up	Third	Champion years
1	(Egypt) Al Ahly SC	21	5	3	1990-1992-1993-1994-1995-1996-1997-1998-1999-2002- 2003-2004-2007-2009-2010-2013-2014-2016-2018-2019- 2021
2	(Egypt) Zamalek SC	4	10	2	1991- 2001-2005-2006
3	(Saudi Arabia) Al-Ittihad	3	7	0	2011-2012-2015
4	(Egypt) ENPPI SC	3	0	0	2022-2023-2024
5	Qatar SC	1	3	1	2017
6	(Iraq) Al-Rasheed SC	1	0	0	1989
7	(Qatar) Al-Rayyan SC	1	1	0	2000
8	(Kuwait) Al-Salmiya SC	1	1	4	2008

== Winners by country ==
Rank	Nation	Winners	Runners-up	Third
1	Egypt	28	15	6
2	Saudi Arabia	3	7	6
3	Qatar	2	7	2
4	Kuwait	1	1	6
5	Iraq	1	0	1
