= Egypt Roller Hockey League =

Sports league

- Sport: Roller Hockey
- Founded: 2007
- No. of teams: 11
- Country: Egypt
- Most recent champion: AL-Dakhlyea Sporting Club
- Website: Roller Hockey in Egypt

The Egyptian Roller Hockey Championship is the biggest Roller Hockey Clubs Championship in Egypt.

== Participated Teams in the last Season ==
The clubs that competed in the season of 2011 were: Al-Zamalek Sporting Club, Al-Dakhlyea, Nasr City, Al-Sekka, Al-Hadeed, Al-Masry, Al-Zohour, Al-Marekh, Al-Maadi, Al-Kahrabaa, Alaab Damanhour.

=== List of Winners ===
Year	Champion
2014/6	ALaab Damanhour
2011/12	AL-Dakhlyea
2010/11	ALaab Damanhour
2009/10	Alaab Damanhour
2008/09	Alaab Damanhour
2007/08	Alaab Damanhour
2006/07	Nasr City Sporting Club

== Egyptian Cup ==
Egyptian Cup is the second main competition of Roller Hockey in Egypt and is disputed by all the Roller Hockey clubs in Egypt.

=== Winners ===
Year	Champion
2010/11	canceled
2009/10	AL-Dakhlyea Sporting Club
2008/09	Nasr City Club
2007/08	AL-Dakhlyea Sporting Club
