= Al Ahly (table tennis) =

Egyptian sporting club

Al Ahly SC
- Founded: 1939
- League: Egyptian Table Tennis League
- Based in: Cairo, Egypt
- Arena: Al Ahly Sports Hall, Cairo
- Colors: Red and white
- Owner: Al Ahly SC 100%
- President: (Egypt) Mahmoud El Khatib
- Head coach: (Egypt) Ashraf Abdel Fattah
- Championships: Egyptian league (35); Egyptian Table tennis Cup (5); Arab table tennis championship (21); ITTF African clubs (3)
- Website: Website

Al Ahly Tennis Table Club (Arabic: النادي الاهلي للتنس الطاولة, often referred to as) is one of Al Ahly SC club's sections that represent the club in Egypt and international Table tennis competitions, the club team section based in Cairo.

== History ==
- Table tennis was first played in Al Ahly in 1939.

- Al Ahly is the biggest team in Egypt, Africa, and the Middle east.

- The players of first-team names were: Farouk Yousef, Nabih Eskander, Samir Beltagy, and Mokhtar Abdelhamid.

- The team manager was Amin Abu Haif.

- The first two championships that the Al Ahly table tennis team won was the Cairo Zone Championship and the El Ebrashy Beek Cup.

== Honors ==
=== National titles ===
- Egyptian Table Tennis League (35) Record :

Champions : 1979-80, 1980-81, 1981-82, 1982-83, 1983-84, 1984-85, 1985-86, 1988-89, 1990-91 1991-92, 1992-93, 1993-94, 1995-96, 1996-97, 1997-98, 1998-99, 2002-03, 2003-04, 2006-07, 2007-08, 2009-10, 2010-11, 2011-12, 2012-13, 2013-14, 2014-15, 2015-16, 2016-17, 2017-18., 2018-19, 2019-20, 2020-21, 2021-22, 2022-23, 2025-26.

- Egyptian Table tennis Cup (5) Record :

Champions : 1991-92, 2002-03, 2003-04, 2016-17, 2018-19

=== International titles ===
- ITTF African clubs (3) :

Champions : 1983, 2015, 2017

Runners-up : 2011

=== Regional titles ===
- Arab table tennis championship (21) Record :

Champions : 1990, 1992, 1993, 1994, 1995, 1996, 1997, 1998, 1999, 2002, 2003, 2004, 2007, 2009, 2010, 2013, 2014, 2016, 2018, 2019, 2021

Runners-up (5): 1991, 2008, 2011, 2012, 2015.

== Men's current squad ==
Team roster - season 2016/2023
Al Ahly tennis Team
(Egypt) Omar Assar	(Egypt) Khaled Assr
(Egypt) EL-SAYED LASHIN	(Egypt) Mohamed EL-Beiali
(Nigeria) Quadri Aruna (loan)
(Egypt) Yassin Elanany

== Women's current squad ==
Team roster - season 2016/2017
Al Ahly Table tennis Team
(Egypt) Yossra ASHRAF	(Egypt) Nadeen EL-DAWLATLY	
(Egypt) Dina Meshref	(Egypt) Aida RAHMO	(Egypt) ROKIA NASER
(Egypt) Fagr SHOUMAN	(Romania) Daniela Dodean (loan)	

== Technical and managerial staff ==
Name	Role	Nationality
Ashraf Abd Elfatah	Head coach	Egyptian
Ashraf Sobhey	Men's Youth team Coach	Egyptian
Tarek Fawzey	Women's Team Coach	Egyptian
Ahmed Ayyad	Women's youth Coach	Egyptian
Hesham Esmaiel	Women's Junior Coach	Egyptian
Yasser Ibrahim	Team manager	Egyptian
Noura Emam	Team Manager	Egyptian

== Notable players ==
- 01- (Egypt) Alaa Meshref
- 02- (Egypt) Sherief ElSaket
- 03- (Egypt) Ashraf Sobhey
- 04- (Egypt) Sherif Diaa
- 05- (Egypt) El Sayed Lashin
- 06- (Egypt) Omar Asser
- 07- (Egypt) (Germany) Adel Massaad
- 08- (Egypt) Ahmed Noussir
- 09- (Egypt) Ashraf Abdel Fatah
- 10- (Egypt) Adel Shoman
- 11- (Egypt) Samy Saaeed
- 12- (Egypt) Mohamed El Sharqwey
- 13- (Egypt) Galal Eiz
- 14- (Egypt) Fathey Abdou
- 15- (Egypt) Sayed Metwaley

== Home Arena ==
When Al Ahly created handball, basketball, and volleyball teams, they believed it was incumbent upon them to erect an arena to host the home games. In 1978, they were low on funding. Because of this, the project was postponed. Later, on February 4, 1994, Al Ahly opened his sports hall officially in time of Al Ahly Chairman Saleh Selim.

Opening Ceremony After many years of waiting, Al Ahly finally achieved his dream of having his very own sports hall arena. On February 4, 1994, Al Ahly officially opened his arena in grand fashion. The ceremony started with words from then-incumbent Al Ahly chairman, Saleh Selim. With this speech, he declared that the name of the hall would be the "Prince Abdalla El Faisl Hall" because of the role he played in creating Al Ahly.

== Club Presidents ==
No	Period	Name	From	To
1	1st	(England) Mitchel Ince	1907	1908
2	1st	(Egypt) Aziz Ezzat Pacha	1908	1916
3	1st	(Egypt) Abdelkhaleq Tharwat Pacha	1916	1924
4	1st	(Egypt) Gaafar Waly Pacha	1924	1940
5	1st	(Egypt) Mohamed Taher Pacha	1940	1941
6	2nd	(Egypt) Gaafar Waly Pacha	1941	1944
7	1st	(Egypt) Ahmed Hasanein Pacha	1944	1946
8	1st	(Egypt) Ahmed Aboud Pacha	1946	1961
9	1st	(Egypt) Salah Desouky Sheshtawy	1961	1965
10	1st	(Egypt) Abdelmohsen Kamel Mortagy	1965	1967
11	1st	(Egypt) Ibrahim El Wakil	1967	1972
12	2nd	(Egypt) Abdelmohsen Kamel Mortagy	1972	1980
13	1st	(Egypt) Saleh Selim	1980	1988
14	1st	(Egypt) Mohamed Abdou Saleh El Wahsh	1988	1992
15	2nd	(Egypt) Saleh Selim	1992	2002
16	1st	(Egypt) Hassan Hamdy	2002	2014
17	1st	(Egypt) Mahmoud Taher	2014	2017
18	1st	(Egypt) Mahmoud El Khatib	2017	Present

== See also ==
- Al Ahly FC
- Al Ahly FC Women
- Al Ahly (volleyball)
- Al Ahly Women's Volleyball
- Al Ahly (basketball)
- Al Ahly Women's Basketball
- Al Ahly (handball)
- Al Ahly Women's Handball
- Al Ahly (table tennis)
- Al Ahly (water polo)
- Port Said Stadium riot
- Al-Ahly TV
