= Al Ahly (water polo) =

Al Ahly SC (water polo)
- Founded: 1907
- League: 1st Division
- Based in: Cairo, Egypt
- Arena: Al Ahly pool
- Colors: Red and white
- Owner: Al Ahly SC 100%
- President: (Egypt) Mahmoud El Khatib
- Head coach: (Serbia) Dejan Jovović
- Championships: 14 × Egyptian league 8 × Egypt cup 8 × Arab Clubs Championship
- Website: Website

Al Ahly water polo team (Arabic: فريق النادي الاهلي لكرة الماء; often referred to as Al Ahly Pool Club) is one of Al Ahly SC club's sections that represent the club in Egypt and international water polo competitions, the club team section based in Cairo.

== Honors ==
=== National achievements ===
- Egyptian League :

Winners (14 titles) : 2022-23, 2023-24, 2024-25

- Egyptian Cup :

Winners (8 titles) : 2002-03, 2010-11,2011-12, 2015-16, 2018-19, 2019-20, 2021-22, 2023-24

=== Regional achievements ===
- Water polo Arab Clubs Championship

Winners (8 titles) (Record) : 1995, 1996, 1998, 2000, 2004, 2005, 2007, 2025
Runners-up (2 vice champions) : 2002, 2006

== Club presidents ==
No	Period	Name	From	To
1	1st	(England) Mitchel Ince	1907	1908
2	1st	(Egypt) Aziz Ezzat Pacha	1908	1916
3	1st	(Egypt) Abdelkhaleq Tharwat Pacha	1916	1924
4	1st	(Egypt) Gaafar Waly Pacha	1924	1940
5	1st	(Egypt) Mohamed Taher Pacha	1940	1941
6	2nd	(Egypt) Gaafar Waly Pacha	1941	1944
7	1st	(Egypt) Ahmed Hasanein Pacha	1944	1946
8	1st	(Egypt) Ahmed Aboud Pacha	1946	1961
9	1st	(Egypt) Salah Desouky Sheshtawy	1961	1965
10	1st	(Egypt) Abdelmohsen Kamel Mortagy	1965	1967
11	1st	(Egypt) Ibrahim El Wakil	1967	1972
12	2nd	(Egypt) Abdelmohsen Kamel Mortagy	1972	1980
13	1st	(Egypt) Saleh Selim	1980	1988
14	1st	(Egypt) Mohamed Abdou Saleh El Wahsh	1988	1992
15	2nd	(Egypt) Saleh Selim	1992	2002
16	1st	(Egypt) Hassan Hamdy	2002	2014
17	1st	(Egypt) Mahmoud Taher	2014	2017
18	1st	(Egypt) Mahmoud El Khatib	2017	Present

== See also ==
- Al Ahly FC
- Al Ahly FC Women
- Al Ahly (volleyball)
- Al Ahly Women's Volleyball
- Al Ahly (basketball)
- Al Ahly Women's Basketball
- Al Ahly (handball)
- Al Ahly Women's Handball
- Al Ahly (table tennis)
- Al Ahly (water polo)
- Port Said Stadium riot
- Al-Ahly TV
