= Juhayna Food Industries =

Egyptian food company

- Formerly: Juhayna Dairy
- Industry: Dairy products, juice
- Headquarters: 6th of October, Egypt
- Area served: Egypt
- Key people: Safwan Thabet (Founder)
- Owners: Seif Thabet (CEO)
- Website: www.juhayna.com

Juhayna Food Industries (Arabic: جهينة للصناعات الغذائية, romanized: Juhayna lil-Ṣināʿāt el-Ghidhāʾiyya) is an Egyptian food and beverage company established in 1983. It commenced production of dairy, yogurt, and juice products in April 1987 with an initial capital of EGP 1.3 million. In 2004, Juhayna Dairy was merged into Juhayna Food Industries, consolidating its operations into a single entity specializing in the production of milk, dairy products, and juices.

The company owns five industrial subsidiaries, in addition to entities dedicated to sales and logistics, as well as agricultural and animal production. Juhayna began its formal corporate activities in January 1996. It holds a licensed capital of EGP 5 billion, with a paid-up capital of EGP 706,053,811, distributed over 706,053,811 shares at a nominal value of EGP 1 per share. The company was listed on the stock exchange in May 2010 and is included in the benchmark EGX 30 index.

== History ==
The company was founded in 1983 by the Egyptian engineer Safwan Thabet. Early in its development, it entered into a strategic agreement with the food packaging company Tetra Pak.

Juhayna later established a joint venture, Argo Food Industries, through a partnership agreement with the European dairy specialist Arla Foods.

In addition, Juhayna formalized a cooperation protocol with the electronic payment platform Fawry, involving annual investments amounting to 15 million Egyptian pounds.

The company has actively participated in prominent international exhibitions, including the third session of the Africa Food Processing Fair and the Anuga International Food Services Exhibition held in Cologne, Germany.

In 2010, the company suffered significant damage due to a fire that destroyed a substantial portion of its factory located in 6th of October. Nonetheless, Juhayna swiftly recovered from the incident and re-established its market presence in Egypt.

== Community service ==
Juhayna has engaged in community development initiatives, including a project to provide roofing for 600 homes in the village of Shandwil, located in Upper Egypt’s Sohag.

== Affiliates ==
- The Egyptian Company for Dairy Products
- Modern International Company for Food Industries
- The Egyptian Company for Food Industries (EGFood)
- Al-Marwa Company for Food Industries and Modern Concentrates
- Good Company for Trade and Distribution

== See also ==
- Wadi Group
