= Al Ahly Sports Hall =

Multi-purpose arena in Cairo, Egypt

Coordinates: 30°02′43″N 31°13′24″E

Prince Abdullah Al-Faisal Hall
- Al-Ahly Sports Hall
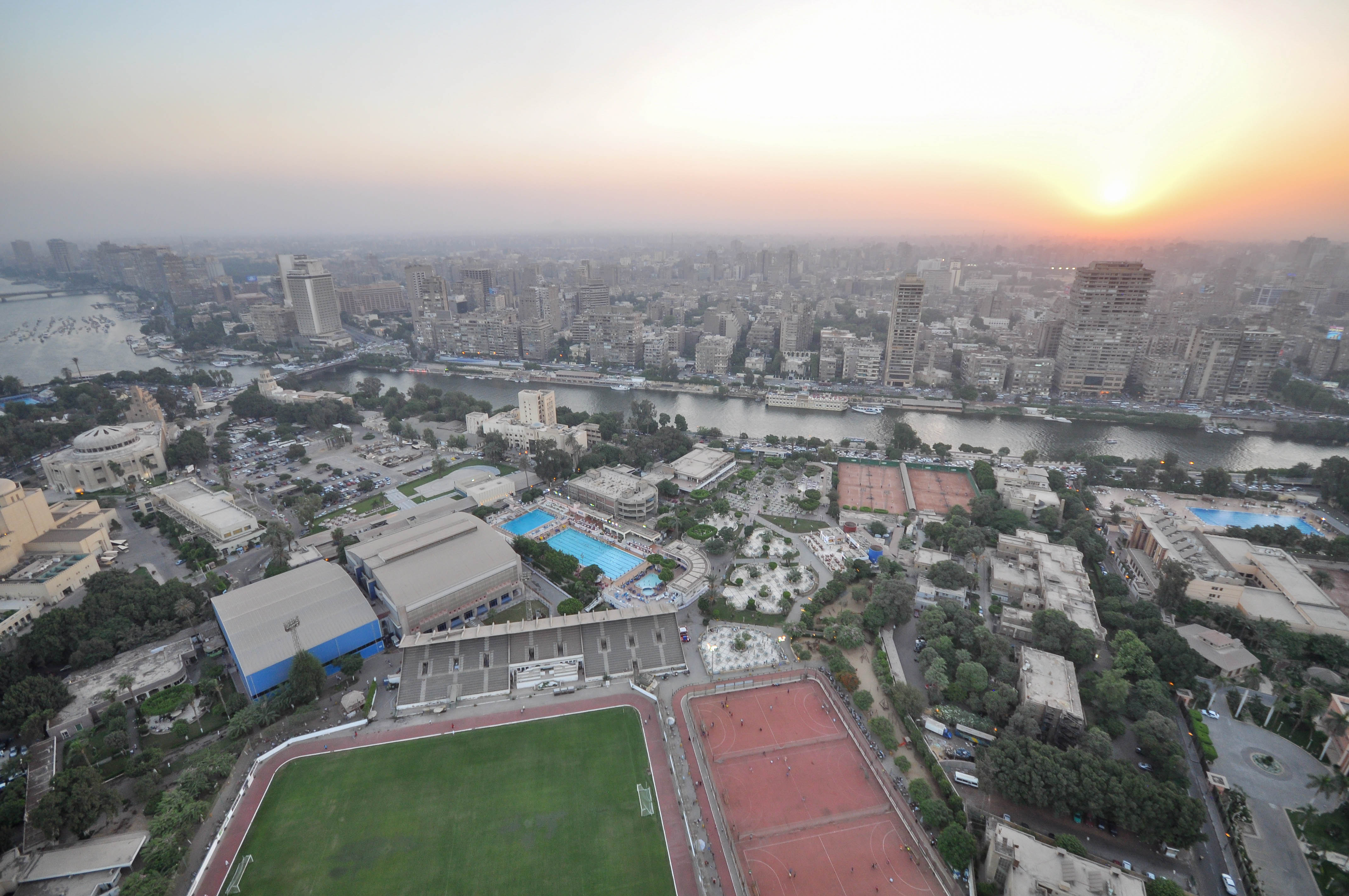
- Interactive map of Prince Abdullah Al-Faisal Hall
- Full name: Prince Abdullah Al-Faisal Hall (Short name : Al Ahly Hall)
- Former names: Prince Abdullah Al-Faisal Hall (1994–présent)
- Address: Mahmoud Mokhtar Street, Gezira Zamalek, Cairo, Egypt, 11568
- Location: Cairo, Egypt
- Owner: Al-Ahly
- Operator: Al-Ahly
- Capacity: 2,500
- Surface: taraflex
- Field size: 4000 M

Construction
- Built: 1991
- Opened: 4 Feb,1994
- Renovated: 2020
- Cost: 13 Million EGP
- Main contractor: Arab Contractors

Tenant
- Al Ahly SC (Main Hall)

Prince Abdullah Al-Faisal Hall (Arabic: صالة الأمير عبد الله الفيصل بالجزيرة) is one of Al-Ahly club's buildings, and a multi-purpose arena in Cairo, Egypt. It is used by the basketball, handball and volleyball sections of the club.

== History ==
When Al-Ahly started to create the teams of handball, basketball and volleyball, they saw it was important to build an arena to host the home matches of these teams, The first time they started to make the designs and searching for funds was 1978, and because of some funding problems the project was postponed.

== Opening ceremony ==
After years of waiting, Al Ahly Club built its sports hall and officially opened it on February 4, 1994. [2] The ceremony began with a speech by the club's president, Saleh Selim, who announced that the hall would be named "Prince Abdullah Al-Faisal Hall" in recognition of his significant role in the club's history. Prince Abdullah Al-Faisal was a devoted supporter of the club, providing both financial and moral support. His son, "Mohammed bin Abdullah Al-Faisal", attended the ceremony, and the club president presented him with a commemorative plaque (a symbolic gift). The first match held in the sports hall was a friendly basketball game between Al Ahly and Al Ittihad Alexandria, followed by an exhibition five-a-side football match between Al Ahly veterans and Ismaily veterans, led by clubs legends Mahmoud El Khatib and Ali Abo Greisha.

== Al-Ahly Main Hall ==
Al-Ahly Main Hall is supplied with 2,500 seats and taraflex ground. The Main Hall is used for all home matches for handball, basketball and volleyball and also for home matches for females teams and youth junior teams. It is also used for some concerts and entertainment events.

== Al-Ahly Sub-Hall ==
Al-Ahly Club has a Sub Hall used for training for various sports teams, as well as youth matches. It also hosts some basketball, handball and volleyball matches when the Main Hall is occupied.

== International sports events ==
The arena has hosted the following international sports events :

- IHF Super Globe 2007
- African Clubs Championship 2003, 2009, 2011, 2018, 2019, 2024
- Women's African Clubs Championship 2018, 2019, 2024, 2026
- African Basketball Cup Winners' Cup 1998
- FIBA Africa Basketball League 2004, 2016
- Women's Basketball League Africa 2025
- African Handball Super cup 2023, 2025
- African Women's Handball Super Cup 2025
- African Men's Handball Cup Winners' Cup 2018, 2023, 2025
- African Women's Handball Cup Winners' Cup 2018, 2023, 2025

The first African Men's Handball Cup Winners' Cup final at Al-Ahly Main Hall took place in 2018. It was won by Al-Ahly. The second one took place in 2023 and was won by Zamalek. The third one took place in 2025 and was won by Al-Ahly after defeating Zamalek 31-28 in front of a crowd of 1,843.

== See also ==
- Al Ahly (table tennis)
- Al-Ahly TV
- Port Said Stadium riot
- List of indoor arenas in Egypt
