= Zamalek SC Women's Volleyball =

Volleyball club in Giza, Egypt

Zamalek WVC
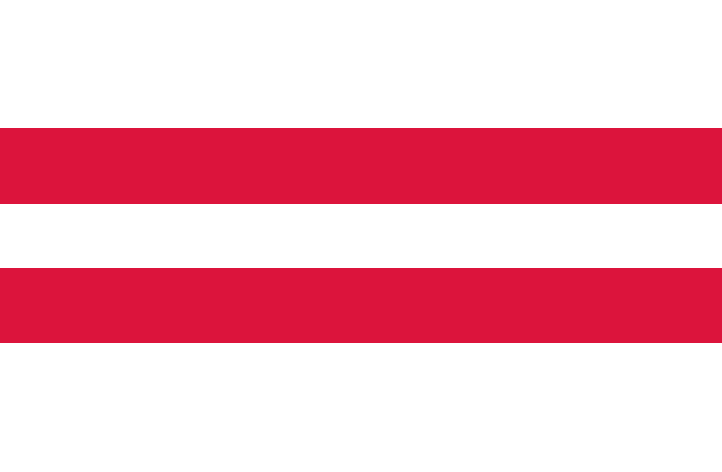
- Full name: Zamalek Sporting Club Women's Volleyball
- Short name: ZSC, Zamalek SC
- Ground: Abdulrahman Fawzi Hall (Capacity: 4,000)
- Chairman: Hussein Labib
- Manager: Ahmed Fathy
- Captain: Yasmine Noah
- League: Egyptian Women's Volleyball League
- 2022-23: 2nd place, silver medalist(s)
- Website: Club home page

Uniforms
Home	Away

Zamalek Women's Volleyball Club (Arabic: نادى الزمالك للكرة الطائرة) commonly known as Zamalek WVC, or simply as Zamalek SC, is a professional volleyball team based in Giza, Egypt. They compete in the Egyptian League.

The volleyball team is one of Zamalek SC club's sections that represent the club in Egypt.

== History ==
=== Continent Champions ===
The 2022-23 season was the most anticipated season for women's sports out of the Zamalek Sports Club teams due to a return to activity and possibility to win a title, which hadn't happened since 1983. After obtaining second place in the Egyptian League standings and winning the Egypt Cup title for the first time since 1980, Zamalek WVC succeeded in winning their 1st title with the club and the 4th title in the club's history in Egyptian Cup. Zamalek WVC also became the first Egyptian team to qualify for a FIVB Women's Club World Championship, the second Arab team and third African team to represent the Arab and African teams in this tournament.

== Honours ==
=== Domestic Competitions ===
- Egyptian League
  - Winners (5): 1978–79, 1979–80, 1980–81, 1982–83, 1994-95
- Egyptian Cup
  - Winners (5): 1978, 1979, 1980, 2023, 2025

=== African Competitions ===
- CAVB Champions League
  - Winners (3): 2023, 2024, 2025
- Women's African Cup Winners' Cup (volleyball)
  - Runners-Up (1) : 1990

== Former club members ==
=== Notable former players ===
- (Egypt) Farida Esmat
- (Egypt) Maryam Esmat
- (Egypt) Samia Mortada
- (Egypt) Atta Mohammed
- (Egypt) Sahara'a Samaida
- (Egypt) Huwaida Hassan
- (Egypt) Omaima Hassan
- (Egypt) Huda Abdel Hamid
- (Egypt) Hana'a Zaki
- (Egypt) Sahar Abdel Aziz

=== Notable former coaches ===
- (Egypt) Abdulrahman Mohammed

== Crest And Colors ==
The logo represents a mixture of the sporting model and the ancient Egyptian civilization. The logo's main colors express peace and struggle and have not changed since its establishment. The home jersey uses the original Zamalek colours, In the upper half of the logo, the arrow that points towards the target appears in a pharaonic uniform as an indication of the common goal between it and Zamalek. Zamalek is famous for the stability of its basic colors, which have not changed throughout the club's history since 1911, as it is distinguished by the white kits with two parallel red lines in the middle. The team shirt is displayed on the chest, and the color symbolizes.

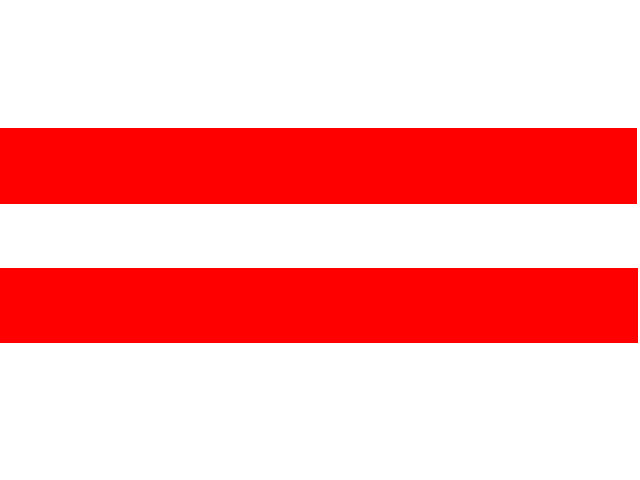

== Kit providers ==
History Of Kit Providers For Zamalek Women's Volleyball Team.

Period	Kit Provider
2023–	Tempo
