= Al Ahly TV =

Egyptian-Arab sports television network

Al-Ahly TV قناة النادي الأهلي
- Country: Egypt

Programming
- Picture format: (1080i 16:9 MPEG-4, HDTV)

Ownership
- Owner: Al Ahly SC

History
- Launched: March 12, 2010; 16 years ago

Availability

Terrestrial
- Nilesat: 11747 V 27500 5/6

Al Ahly TV (Arabic: قناة الأهلي) is an Egyptian television channel that currently Broadcast the football team's friendly matches, youth team matches and other sports matches. The channel was established in 2008, in cooperation with Arab Radio and Television Network. The official broadcast of the channel was launched on 12/3/2010 When former club president Hassan Hamdy announced the opening of the channel.
