= FIBA AfroBasket 2025 =

AfroBasket 2025

Tournament details
- Host country: Angola
- Dates: 12–24 August
- Teams: 16
- Venue(s): 2 (in 2 host cities)

Final positions
- Champions: Angola (12th title)
- Runners-up: Mali
- Third place: Senegal
- Fourth place: Cameroon

Tournament statistics
- Games played: 34
- MVP: (Angola) Childe Dundão
- Top scorer: (Guinea) Alpha Diallo (23.8 ppg)

FIBA AfroBasket 2025 was the 31st edition of the FIBA AfroBasket, a men's basketball continental championship of Africa. The tournament was hosted by Angola for the fourth time between 12 and 24 August.

Tunisia are the two-time defending champion, having won the 2017 and 2021 tournaments. However, they were eliminated by Cape Verde in the playoff round. Angola won a record-extending twelfth title, after defeating first-time finalists Mali in the final. Senegal finished in third place for a third time in a row, after beating Cameroon. Angola's Childe Dundão won MVP honours.

== Host selection ==
- Angola
- Egypt
- Morocco
- Senegal
- Tunisia

FIBA Africa decided to announce the host country in March 2024. On 12 March, Angola were reported to be given the hosting rights. On 26 March 2024, Angola received the hosting rights, beating fellow bidders Egypt, Morocco, Senegal and Tunisia. Angola's organizational capacity and infrastructure was one of the driving factors in Angola's selection. This will be Angola's first time hosting since 2007.

== Venues ==
Alongside the capital Luanda, venues in Moçâmedes, Lubango, Benguela, Huambo and Huíla were considered. In April 2025, it was announced that Luanda and Moçâmedes will host the games.

FIBA AfroBasket 2025 (Angola)	Luanda	Moçâmedes
FIBA AfroBasket 2025 (Angola)	Pavilhão Multiusos de Luanda	Pavilhão Welwitschia Mirabilis
FIBA AfroBasket 2025 (Angola)	Capacity: 12,720	Capacity: 3,072

== Qualification ==
Map of qualifiers for the AfroBasket 2025: Team qualified for AfroBasket 2025 Team failed to qualify Did not enter

23 teams took part in qualification, including hosts Angola, who participated for preparation reasons. The teams who failed to qualify for the previous edition played in the pre-qualifiers. The advancing teams progressed to the qualifiers where each team was drawn into five groups of four. The top three from each group qualified for AfroBasket. The qualification draw was held on 24 November 2023 in South Africa. Games were played from February 2024 to February 2025, to determine the 16 nations who will qualify for the tournament.

Of the qualified teams, 14 countries took part in the previous edition. The only returnees are Libya and Madagascar, whom return to the final tournament after both teams' last appearance was as hosts in 2009 and 2011 respectively.

Two time champions, Central African Republic, failed to qualify for the first time since 1999. Also, having appearing at the last edition, Kenya failed to advance this time around.

DR Congo and Guinea qualified for their third consecutive edition for the first time ever.

=== Qualified teams ===
Team	Qualification method	Date of qualification	App	First	Last	Streak	Best placement in tournament	WR
Angola	Host nation	27 March 2024	22nd	1980	2021	22	Champions (Eleven times) (Note: Angola has won in 1989, 1992, 1993, 1995, 1999, 2001, 2003, 2005, 2007, 2009, and 2013.)	33
DR Congo	Group A top three	21 February 2025	8th	1974	2021	3	Fourth place (1975)	72
Senegal	Group C top three	21 February 2025	30th	1964	2021	30	Champions (1968, 1972, 1978, 1980, 1997)	47
Cameroon	Group C top three	21 February 2025	11th	1972	2021	8	Runners-up (2007)	64
Ivory Coast	Group D top three	21 February 2025	25th	1968	2021	23	Champions (1981, 1985)	31
Egypt	Group D top three	21 February 2025	25th	1962	2021	13	Champions (1962, 1964, 1970, 1975, 1983)	38
Tunisia	Group E top three	21 February 2025	24th	1964	2021	12	Champions (2011, 2017, 2021)	36
South Sudan	Group A top three	21 February 2025	2nd	2021	2021	2	Seventh place (2021)	23
Madagascar	Group D top three	22 February 2025	4th	1972	2011	1	Ninth place (1972)	105
Mali	Group A top three	22 February 2025	21st	1964	2021	9	Third place (1972)	83
Guinea	Group E top three	23 February 2025	7th	1962	2021	3	Fourth place (1962)	75
Rwanda	Group C top three	23 February 2025	7th	1989	2021	3	Ninth place (2009)	93
Uganda	Group B top four	23 February 2025	4th	2015	2021	4	Sixth place (2021)	85
Nigeria	Group B top four	23 February 2025	20th	1972	2021	14	Champions (2015)	42
Cape Verde	Group B top four	23 February 2025	8th	1997	2021	2	Third place (2007)	45
Libya	Group B top four	23 February 2025	5th	1965	2009	1	Fifth place (1970)	94

== Draw ==
The draw took place on 9 May 2025 in Luanda, Angola.

=== Seeding ===
The seeding was announced on 5 May 2025. The 16 participating teams will be divided into for groups of four teams each. They will be divided into four pots according to their ranking in the last edition of FIBA AfroBasket 2021, but also according to the FIBA ranking.

Seed 1
Team	Pos
Angola	33
Tunisia	36
Ivory Coast	31
Senegal	47

Seed 2
Team	Pos
South Sudan	23
Egypt	38
Nigeria	42
Cape Verde	45

Seed 3
Team	Pos
Cameroon	64
DR Congo	72
Guinea	75
Mali	83

Seed 4
Team	Pos
Uganda	85
Rwanda	93
Libya	94
Madagascar	105

== Squads ==
Each team consisted of 12 players.

== Preliminary round ==
All times are local (UTC+1).

=== Group A ===
Pos	Team	Pld	W	L	PF	PA	PD	Pts	Qualification
1	Ivory Coast	3	3	0	235	214	+21	6	Quarterfinals
2	Cape Verde	3	2	1	231	210	+21	5	Qualification to quarterfinals
3	DR Congo	3	1	2	194	208	−14	4	Qualification to quarterfinals
4	Rwanda	3	0	3	190	218	−28	3	

Source: FIBA
Rules for classification: 1) Points; 2) Head-to-head results; 3) Points difference; 4) Points scored.

13 August 2025
16:00

Boxscore

Ivory Coast	78–70	Rwanda
Scoring by quarter: 14–14, 22–23, 21–18, 21–15
Pts: Moularé 18; Rebs: Costello 11; Asts: Costello 6		Pts: Habimana 18; Rebs: Mutabazi, Ward 7 Asts: Habimana 6

Pavilhão Welwitschia Mirabilis, Moçâmedes
Attendance: 200
Referees: Grant Todey (USA), James Griguol (AUS), Yann Davidson (MAD)

13 August 2025
19:00

Boxscore

DR Congo	66–75	Cape Verde
Scoring by quarter: 16–20, 18–5, 16–30, 16–20
Pts: Sakho 17; Rebs: Kande-Kieli, Lutete 7 Asts: Jordan 9		Pts: W. Tavares 17; Rebs: E. Tavares 19; Asts: I. Almeida 5

Pavilhão Welwitschia Mirabilis, Moçâmedes
Attendance: 200
Referees: Amr Aboollo (EGY), Wael Mostafa (EGY), Kingsley Ojeaburu (NGA)

15 August 2025
16:00

Boxscore

Rwanda	58–65	DR Congo
Scoring by quarter: 18–26, 6–11, 19–14, 15–14
Pts: Habimana 16; Rebs: Ward 8 Asts: Habimana 5		Pts: Sakho 21; Rebs: Sakho 14; Asts: three players 3

Pavilhão Welwitschia Mirabilis, Moçâmedes
Attendance: 80
Referees: Kingsley Ojeaburu (NGA), Yann Davidson (MAD), James Griguol (AUS)

15 August 2025
19:00

Boxscore

Cape Verde	81–82	Ivory Coast
Scoring by quarter: 13–18, 22–22, 30–16, 16–26
Pts: I. Almeida 22; Rebs: Almeida 13; Asts: Almeida 5		Pts: Dally 16; Rebs: Moularé 8 Asts: Koné 3

Pavilhão Welwitschia Mirabilis, Moçâmedes
Attendance: 90
Referees: Amr Aboollo (EGY), Mbaye Seye (SEN), Grant Todey (USA)

17 August 2025
16:00

Boxscore

Cape Verde	75–62	Rwanda
Scoring by quarter: 20–8, 17–21, 24–12, 14–21
Pts: J. Almeida 17; Rebs: E. Tavares 11; Asts: I. Almeida 5		Pts: Ndayisaba, Twa 13; Rebs: Ward 10; Asts: Habimana 7

Pavilhão Welwitschia Mirabilis, Moçâmedes
Attendance: 80
Referees: Kingsley Ojeaburu (NGA), Yann Davidson (MAD), Mahamadou Diallo (MLI)

17 August 2025
19:00

Boxscore

Ivory Coast	75–63	DR Congo
Scoring by quarter: 17–21, 21–9, 16–22, 21–11
Pts: Kouadio 13; Rebs: Costello 10; Asts: Koné 6		Pts: Sakho 18; Rebs: Lutete 9 Asts: Lutete 4

Pavilhão Welwitschia Mirabilis, Moçâmedes
Attendance: 150
Referees: Wael Mostafa (EGY), James Griguol (AUS), Mbaye Seye (SEN)

=== Group B ===
Pos	Team	Pld	W	L	PF	PA	PD	Pts	Qualification
1	Nigeria	3	3	0	263	215	+48	6	Quarterfinals
2	Cameroon	3	2	1	256	241	+15	5	Qualification to quarterfinals
3	Tunisia	3	1	2	212	233	−21	4	Qualification to quarterfinals
4	Madagascar	3	0	3	196	238	−42	3	

Source: FIBA
Rules for classification: 1) Points; 2) Head-to-head results; 3) Points difference; 4) Points scored.

13 August 2025
14:30

Boxscore

Madagascar	59–77	Nigeria
Scoring by quarter: 14–18, 23–20, 9–17, 13–22
Pts: Raharimanantoanina 20; Rebs: Andriatsarafara, Ratianarivo 5 Asts: Razanamahenina 3		Pts: Agada 22; Rebs: Agada 7 Asts: Okogie 5

Pavilhão Multiusos de Luanda, Luanda
Attendance: 55
Referees: Arnold Moseya (RSA), Roberto Fernández (CRC), Sofiane Si Youcef (ALG)

13 August 2025
17:30

Boxscore

Tunisia	65–86	Cameroon
Scoring by quarter: 18–28, 24–23, 17–21, 6–14
Pts: Jawadi 16; Rebs: Ochi, Toumi 9 Asts: Abada, Jawadi 3		Pts: Narace 20; Rebs: Bayehe, Narace 6 Asts: Gbetkom 5

Pavilhão Multiusos de Luanda, Luanda
Attendance: 150
Referees: Ruben Woolcock (AUS), Hassane Kamate (CIV), Jean Ruhamiriza (RWA)

15 August 2025
14:30

Boxscore

Nigeria	87–66	Tunisia
Scoring by quarter: 29–16, 19–17, 20–14, 19–19
Pts: Okogie 33; Rebs: three players 6 Asts: Okoye 3		Pts: Abada 15; Rebs: Toumi 7 Asts: Abada 4

Pavilhão Multiusos de Luanda, Luanda
Referees: Jean Ruhamiriza (RWA), Claudio Eiuba (ANG), Tonton Banza (COD)

15 August 2025
17:30

Boxscore

Cameroon	80–77	Madagascar
Scoring by quarter: 14–12, 32–26, 20–25, 14–14
Pts: Hill 21; Rebs: Narace 9 Asts: Hill 7		Pts: Razanamahenina 29; Rebs: Andriatsarafara 13; Asts: Razanamahenina 3

Pavilhão Multiusos de Luanda, Luanda
Attendance: 123
Referees: Ruben Woolcock (AUS), Hassane Kamate (CIV), Roberto Fernández (CRC)

17 August 2025
14:30

Boxscore

Tunisia	81–60	Madagascar
Scoring by quarter: 16–12, 15–20, 19–10, 31–18
Pts: Marnaoui 33; Rebs: Methnani 8 Asts: Abada 5		Pts: Randriamampionona 17; Rebs: Andriatsarafara 14; Asts: Lahontan 6

Pavilhão Multiusos de Luanda, Luanda
Referees: Roberto Fernández (CRC), Jean Ruhamiriza (RWA), Hassane Kamate (CIV)

17 August 2025
17:30

Boxscore

Nigeria	99–90	Cameroon
Scoring by quarter: 28–25, 30–16, 26–12, 15–37
Pts: Okogie 16; Rebs: Okoye 7 Asts: Okogie 7		Pts: Moute a Bidias 19; Rebs: Choh 8 Asts: Hill 5

Pavilhão Multiusos de Luanda, Luanda
Attendance: 2,000
Referees: Arnold Moseya (RSA), Ruben Woolcock (AUS), Claudio Eiuba (ANG)

=== Group C ===
Pos	Team	Pld	W	L	PF	PA	PD	Pts	Qualification
1	Angola (H)	3	3	0	235	185	+50	6	Quarterfinals
2	Guinea	3	2	1	239	219	+20	5	Qualification to quarterfinals
3	South Sudan	3	1	2	259	206	+53	4	Qualification to quarterfinals
4	Libya	3	0	3	160	283	−123	3	

Source: FIBA
Rules for classification: 1) Points; 2) Head-to-head results; 3) Points difference; 4) Points scored.
(H) Hosts

12 August 2025
14:00

Boxscore

South Sudan	80–88	Guinea
Scoring by quarter: 20–30, 18–16, 21–24, 21–18
Pts: Omot 27; Rebs: Lual-Acuil 10; Asts: McCullum 6		Pts: Diallo 28; Rebs: Sylla 9 Asts: Boum 9

Pavilhão Welwitschia Mirabilis, Moçâmedes
Attendance: 123
Referees: Yann Davidson (MAD), Wael Mostafa (EGY), Kingsley Ojeaburu (NGA)

12 August 2025
19:00

Boxscore

Angola	85–53	Libya
Scoring by quarter: 20–13, 18–11, 21–13, 26–16
Pts: Dundão, Kokila 12; Rebs: Sousa 12; Asts: Dundão 6		Pts: Badrush 16; Rebs: Hamad 7 Asts: Rezg 4

Pavilhão Multiusos de Luanda, Luanda
Attendance: 6,789
Referees: Arnold Moseya (RSA), Ruben Woolcock (AUS), Hassane Kamate (CIV)

14 August 2025
16:00

Boxscore

Libya	52–115	South Sudan
Scoring by quarter: 12–31, 11–31, 10–33, 19–20
Pts: Badrush 17; Rebs: Rizq 7 Asts: Madi 3		Pts: Lual-Acuil, Omot 16; Rebs: Kuath 13; Asts: Akot, Omot 5

Pavilhão Welwitschia Mirabilis, Moçâmedes
Attendance: 80
Referees: James Griguol (AUS), Mahamadou Diallo (MLI), Mbaye Seye (SEN)

14 August 2025
19:00

Boxscore

Guinea	68–84	Angola
Scoring by quarter: 18–18, 16–15, 19–27, 15–24
Pts: Diallo 24; Rebs: Diakite 11; Asts: Diakité 3		Pts: Fernando, Miguel 14; Rebs: Fernando 14; Asts: Gonçalves 6

Pavilhão Welwitschia Mirabilis, Moçâmedes
Attendance: 500
Referees: Wael Mostafa (EGY), Grant Todey (USA), Amir Taboubi (TUN)

16 August 2025
16:00

Boxscore

Guinea	83–55	Libya
Scoring by quarter: 26–10, 17–18, 22–8, 18–19
Pts: Keita 14; Rebs: Diakite, Keita 9 Asts: Dramé 4		Pts: Hamad 15; Rebs: Buzgaiya 6 Asts: Dawo 4

Pavilhão Welwitschia Mirabilis, Moçâmedes
Attendance: 80
Referees: Kingsley Ojeaburu (NGA), Grant Todey (USA), James Griguol (AUS)

16 August 2025
19:00

Boxscore

Angola	66–64	South Sudan
Scoring by quarter: 24–17, 13–10, 18–15, 11–22
Pts: Gakou 13; Rebs: three players 7 Asts: Dundão 8		Pts: Omot 12; Rebs: Gabriel 9 Asts: McCullum 7

Pavilhão Welwitschia Mirabilis, Moçâmedes
Attendance: 5,000
Referees: Mbaye Seye (SEN), Mahamadou Diallo (MLI), Amir Taboubi (TUN)

=== Group D ===
Pos	Team	Pld	W	L	PF	PA	PD	Pts	Qualification
1	Egypt	3	3	0	242	200	+42	6	Quarterfinals
2	Senegal	3	2	1	245	214	+31	5	Qualification to quarterfinals
3	Mali	3	1	2	214	226	−12	4	Qualification to quarterfinals
4	Uganda	3	0	3	189	250	−61	3	

Source: FIBA
Rules for classification: 1) Points; 2) Head-to-head results; 3) Points difference; 4) Points scored.

12 August 2025
12:00

Boxscore

Senegal	88–53	Uganda
Scoring by quarter: 30–18, 14–12, 16–9, 28–14
Pts: Boissy, Gueye 16; Rebs: Camara 13; Asts: Boissy 4		Pts: Geu 17; Rebs: Komagum 14; Asts: Moni, Rugette 2

Pavilhão Multiusos de Luanda, Luanda
Attendance: 150
Referees: Sofiane Si Youcef (ALG), Claudio Eiuba (ANG), Haytham Ihaqaf (LBA)

12 August 2025
15:00

Boxscore

Mali	59–74	Egypt
Scoring by quarter: 10–20, 18–15, 18–20, 13–19
Pts: Kanouté 16; Rebs: M. Diarra 6 Asts: Kanouté 5		Pts: Amin 21; Rebs: Amin 8 Asts: three players 3

Pavilhão Multiusos de Luanda, Luanda
Attendance: 300
Referees: Jean Ruhamiriza (RWA), Tonton Banza (COD), Roberto Fernández (CRC)

14 August 2025
14:30

Boxscore

Uganda	72–85	Mali
Scoring by quarter: 8–25, 23–18, 20–18, 21–24
Pts: Geu 27; Rebs: Komagum 13; Asts: Komagum 5		Pts: Coulibaly 25; Rebs: A. Diarra 10; Asts: Kanouté 10

Pavilhão Multiusos de Luanda, Luanda
Referees: Roberto Fernández (CRC), Sofiane Si Youcef (ALG), Haytham Ihaqaf (LBA)

14 August 2025
17:30

Boxscore

Egypt	91–77	Senegal
Scoring by quarter: 20–18, 22–18, 25–19, 24–22
Pts: Taha 22; Rebs: Mahmoud 12; Asts: Amin 5		Pts: Badio 18; Rebs: Faye 10; Asts: Badio 4

Pavilhão Multiusos de Luanda, Luanda
Attendance: 567
Referees: Arnold Moseya (RSA), Ruben Woolcock (AUS), Tonton Banza (COD)

16 August 2025
14:30

Boxscore

Senegal	80–70	Mali
Scoring by quarter: 14–18, 18–22, 21–20, 27–10
Pts: Badio, Boissy 17; Rebs: Diop 10; Asts: Boissy 6		Pts: Kanouté 20; Rebs: A. Diarra 13; Asts: Kanouté 9

Pavilhão Multiusos de Luanda, Luanda
Attendance: 234
Referees: Jean Ruhamiriza (RWA), Sofiane Si Youcef (ALG), Claudio Eiuba (ANG)

16 August 2025
17:30

Boxscore

Egypt	77–64	Uganda
Scoring by quarter: 17–18, 17–15, 21–12, 22–19
Pts: Abdelhalim 17; Rebs: Abdelgawad, Gardner 7 Asts: Abdelhalim, Taha 4		Pts: Geu 22; Rebs: Komagum 12; Asts: Komagum 4

Pavilhão Multiusos de Luanda, Luanda
Referees: Arnold Moseya (RSA), Ruben Woolcock (AUS), Tonton Banza (COD)

== Knockout stage ==
=== Bracket ===
Qualification to quarterfinals
19 August
Cape Verde	87
Tunisia	54
19 August
Cameroon	77
DR Congo	68
18 August
Guinea	67
Mali	70
18 August
Senegal	78
South Sudan	65

Quarter-finals
21 August
Angola	90
Cape Verde	80
21 August
Egypt	68
Cameroon	95
20 August
Ivory Coast	96
Mali	102
20 August
Nigeria	75
Senegal	91

Semi-finals
23 August
Angola	74
Cameroon	73
23 August
Mali	88
Senegal	80

Final
24 August
Angola	70
Mali	43
Third place
24 August
Cameroon	72
Senegal	98

=== Qualification to quarterfinals ===
18 August 2025
16:00

Boxscore

Guinea	67–70	Mali
Scoring by quarter: 12–25, 23–21, 20–7, 12–17
Pts: Diallo 31; Rebs: Dramé 13; Asts: Diallo 3		Pts: A. Diarra 15; Rebs: A. Diarra 12; Asts: Kanouté 9

Pavilhão Multiusos de Luanda, Luanda
Referees: Arnold Moseya (RSA), Grant Todey (USA), Jean Ruhamiriza (RWA)

18 August 2025
19:00

Boxscore

Senegal	78–65	South Sudan
Scoring by quarter: 21–18, 25–7, 16–29, 16–11
Pts: Badio 31; Rebs: Badji 13; Asts: Boissy 6		Pts: Gach 14; Rebs: Omot 9 Asts: Omot 4

Pavilhão Multiusos de Luanda, Luanda
Referees: Yann Davidson (MAD), Ruben Woolcock (AUS), Roberto Fernández (CRC)

19 August 2025
16:00

Boxscore

Cape Verde	87–54	Tunisia
Scoring by quarter: 15–13, 18–13, 27–12, 27–16
Pts: three players 14; Rebs: Gomes, E. Tavares 7 Asts: I. Almeida 7		Pts: Jawadi 19; Rebs: Ochi 8 Asts: Abada 5

Pavilhão Multiusos de Luanda, Luanda
Referees: Kingsley Ojeaburu (NGA), Ruben Woolcock (AUS), James Griguol (AUS)

19 August 2025
19:00

Boxscore

Cameroon	77–68	DR Congo
Scoring by quarter: 19–13, 18–23, 23–13, 17–19
Pts: Missi 20; Rebs: Missi 12; Asts: three players 3		Pts: Miteo 14; Rebs: Lutete, Miteo 6 Asts: Jordan 6

Pavilhão Multiusos de Luanda, Luanda
Referees: Arnold Moseya (RSA), Mbaye Seye (SEN), Claudio Eiuba (ANG)

=== Quarterfinals ===
20 August 2025
16:00

Boxscore

Ivory Coast	96–102 (OT)	Mali
Scoring by quarter: 27–28, 27–14, 15–29, 21–19, Overtime: 6–12
Pts: Costello 21; Rebs: Diabate 9 Asts: Diabate 7		Pts: A. Diarra 35; Rebs: A. Diarra 16; Asts: Kanouté 11

Pavilhão Multiusos de Luanda, Luanda
Referees: Arnold Moseya (RSA), Ruben Woolcock (AUS), Roberto Fernández (CRC)

20 August 2025
19:00

Boxscore

Nigeria	75–91	Senegal
Scoring by quarter: 24–23, 18–30, 13–23, 20–15
Pts: Nwamu 15; Rebs: Okoye 7 Asts: Okogie 3		Pts: Badio 32; Rebs: Diop 10; Asts: Diop 4

Pavilhão Multiusos de Luanda, Luanda
Referees: Jean Ruhamiriza (RWA), Grant Todey (USA), James Griguol (AUS)

21 August 2025
16:00

Boxscore

Egypt	68–95	Cameroon
Scoring by quarter: 16–27, 21–24, 15–28, 16–16
Pts: Mahmoud 14; Rebs: Amin 9 Asts: Amin, Mahmoud 3		Pts: Ateba 26; Rebs: Choh, Missi 7 Asts: Choh 5

Pavilhão Multiusos de Luanda, Luanda
Referees: James Griguol (AUS), Roberto Fernández (CRC), Mbaye Seye (SEN)

21 August 2025
19:00

Boxscore

Angola	90–80	Cape Verde
Scoring by quarter: 24–15, 21–25, 20–23, 25–17
Pts: Dundão 30; Rebs: Bango, De Sousa 5 Asts: Gonçalves 7		Pts: J. Almeida 19; Rebs: E. Tavares 7 Asts: I. Almeida 5

Pavilhão Multiusos de Luanda, Luanda
Attendance: 12,700
Referees: Yann Davidson (MAD), Grant Todey (USA), Kingsley Ojeaburu (NGA)

=== Semifinals ===
23 August 2025
16:00

Boxscore

Mali	88–80	Senegal
Scoring by quarter: 19–22, 24–13, 24–23, 21–22
Pts: Coulibaly 23; Rebs: A. Diarra 9 Asts: Kanouté 8		Pts: Boissy 19; Rebs: N'Diaye 7 Asts: Badio 5

Pavilhão Multiusos de Luanda, Luanda
Referees: James Griguol (AUS), Jean Ruhamiriza (RWA), Grant Todey (USA)

23 August 2025
19:00

Boxscore

Angola	74–73	Cameroon
Scoring by quarter: 16–21, 21–17, 15–21, 22–14
Pts: Miguel 17; Rebs: Valente 7 Asts: Dundão 9		Pts: Ateba 14; Rebs: Choh 9 Asts: Hill 6

Pavilhão Multiusos de Luanda, Luanda
Attendance: 12,700
Referees: Ruben Woolcock (AUS), Roberto Fernández (CRC), Arnold Moseya (RSA)

=== Third place game ===
24 August 2025
16:00

Boxscore

Cameroon	72–98	Senegal
Scoring by quarter: 14–28, 12–19, 22–31, 24–20
Pts: Bayehe 18; Rebs: Missi 7 Asts: Hill 6		Pts: Boissy 40; Rebs: Faye 8 Asts: Boissy 7

Pavilhão Multiusos de Luanda, Luanda
Referees: Yann Davidson (MAD), Arnold Moseya (RSA), Grant Todey (USA)

=== Final ===
24 August 2025
19:00

Boxscore

Angola	70–43	Mali
Scoring by quarter: 14–10, 18–10, 19–11, 19–12
Pts: Dundão 16; Rebs: Sousa 7 Asts: Dundão 5		Pts: Kanouté 14; Rebs: Kanouté 8 Asts: Kanouté 4

Pavilhão Multiusos de Luanda, Luanda
Attendance: 12,700
Referees: James Griguol (AUS), Jean Ruhamiriza (RWA), Roberto Fernández (CRC)

== Final standings ==
Rank	Team	Record
1st place, gold medalist(s)	Angola	6–0
2nd place, silver medalist(s)	Mali	4–3
3rd place, bronze medalist(s)	Senegal	5–2
4	Cameroon	4–3
5	Nigeria	3–1
6	Egypt	3–1
7	Ivory Coast	3–1
8	Cape Verde	3–2
9	Guinea	2–2
10	South Sudan	1–3
11	DR Congo	1–3
12	Tunisia	1–3
13	Rwanda	0–3
14	Madagascar	0–3
15	Uganda	0–3
16	Libya	0–3

== Awards ==
2025 FIBA AfroBasket champions

Angola
12th title

The awards were announced on 24 August 2025.

All-Tournament Team
Guards	Forwards	Center
(Angola) Childe Dundão (Senegal) Brancou Badio	(Mali) Mahamane Coulibaly (Angola) Bruno Fernando	(Mali) Aliou Diarra
MVP: (Angola) Childe Dundão

== Statistical leaders ==
=== Players ===
Points

Name	PPG
(Guinea) Alpha Diallo	23.8
(Senegal) Brancou Badio	19.9
(Senegal) Jean Jacques Boissy	19.0
(South Sudan) Nuni Omot	17.0
(Democratic Republic of the Congo) Jordan Sakho	16.3

Rebounds

Name	RPG
(Cape Verde) Edy Tavares	10.4
(Mali) Aliou Diarra	9.7
(Democratic Republic of the Congo) Claude Lutete	8.5
(Democratic Republic of the Congo) Jordan Sakho	8.0
(Ivory Coast) Matt Costello	8.0

Assists

Name	APG
(Mali) Siriman Kanouté	7.6
(Angola) Childe Dundão	5.8
(Cape Verde) Ivan Almeida	5.4
(Cameroon) Jeremiah Hill	5.0
(Democratic Republic of the Congo) John Jordan	7.1

Blocks

Name	BPG
(Senegal) Ibou Badji	4.2
(Cameroon) Yves Missi	2.7
(Guinea) Mamadi Diakité	2.3
(Mali) Aliou Diarra	2.0
(Tunisia) Bechi Ben Yahia	2.0
(Nigeria) Kaodirichi Akobundu-Ehiogu	2.0

Steals

Name	SPG
(Nigeria) Caleb Agada	3.8
(Senegal) Jean Jacques Boissy	3.0
(Angola) Childe Dundão	2.8
(Ivory Coast) Solo Diabate	2.8
(South Sudan) Kendale McCullum	2.5

Efficiency

Name	EFFPG
(Mali) Aliou Diarra	21.6
(Democratic Republic of the Congo) Jordan Sakho	21.5
(South Sudan) Nuni Omot	20.0
(Cape Verde) Edy Tavares	20.0
(Guinea) Mamadi Diakité	19.3

=== Teams ===
Points

Name	PPG
Senegal	84.6
Nigeria	84.5
Ivory Coast	82.8
Cameroon	81.9
South Sudan	81.0

Rebounds

Name	RPG
Senegal	52.1
Cape Verde	45.8
Guinea	45.8
Egypt	45.3
Mali	45.0

Assists

Name	APG
Cape Verde	19.0
Ivory Coast	18.5
South Sudan	17.8
Mali	17.6
Angola	17.0

Blocks

Name	BPG
Mali	5.9
Senegal	5.4
DR Congo	4.8
South Sudan	4.5
Guinea	4.5

Steals

Name	SPG
Angola	13.5
Ivory Coast	11.8
Uganda	11.3
Nigeria	10.5
Senegal	10.4

Efficiency

Name	EFFPG
Senegal	96.7
Cape Verde	93.8
Nigeria	92.5
Ivory Coast	89.8
South Sudan	89.3

=== Player game highs ===
Category	Player	Team	Opponent	Total
Points	Jean Jacques Boissy	Senegal	Cameroon	40
Rebounds	Edy Tavares	Cape Verde	DR Congo	19
Assists	Siriman Kanouté	Mali	Ivory Coast	11
Steals	seven players			5
Blocks	Ibou Badji	Angola	Mali	8
Three-point field goals	Jean Jacques Boissy	Senegal	Cameroon	8
