= Gatwal Yul =

South Sudanese-born Ugandan activist

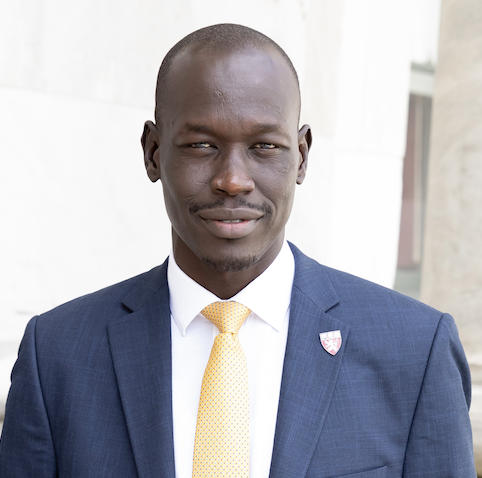
- Gatwal in 2023
- Born: Gatwal Gatkuoth Yul; November 23, 1989 (age 36); Fangak, South Sudan
- Citizenship: South Sudanese
- Education: Kampala International University
- Occupation: Peace-building. Healthcare
- Awards: Tomorrow's Peacebuilder Award

Gatwal Augustine Gatkuoth is a peace-builder and South Sudanese refugee living in Uganda. He fled hundreds of miles to Uganda at the age of 11 from South Sudan. He is the founder of the Upper Nile Institute of Public Health (UNIPH) and Young Adult Empowerment Initiative. He is also a 2017 fellow of the US Institute of Peace, a 2019 Obama Foundation African leader, and the recipient of the 2018 Peace Direct's Tomorrow's Peacebuilders Award.

== Early life and education ==
Gatwal Yul was born in Fangak village in South Sudan and was forced to flee his homeland because of war. He sought asylum in Uganda when he was only eleven years old where he joined boarding school in Kampala.

== Career ==
Gatwal Yul is the founder of the Upper Nile Institute and the Young Adult Empowerment Initiative. He is the 2017 U.S. Peace Fellow and 2019 Obama Foundation Africa Leader. He was also honored with the Peacemaker Award by Peace Direct for 2018. In April 2020, Gatwal briefed the United Nations Security Council on resolutions 2250 and 2419, with the UN Secretary-General -General and the Secretary-General's Representative for Youths, focused on Peace and Security (YPS). This was part of his continued work advocating for the cause of YPS, both grassroots and internationally.

== Awards and recognition ==
- 2017 fellow of the US Institute of Peace.
- 2018 Peace Direct's Tomorrow's Peacebuilders Award.
- 2019 Obama Foundation African leader.

== See also ==
- Adongo Agada Cham
- Sarah Chan (basketball)
- James Chiengjiek
- Mabior Chol
- Aweng Ade-Chuol
- United Nations Special Envoy on Myanmar
