= 2015 FIBA Africa Women's Clubs Champions Cup =

2015 FIBA Africa Champions Cup for Women
21st FIBA Africa Champions Cup for Women

Tournament details
- Host country: Angola
- Dates: November 27 – December 6
- Teams: 12 (from 53 federations)
- Venue: 1 (in 1 host city)

Final positions
- Champions: Angola (1º de Agosto's 2nd title; Angola's 6th title)

Tournament statistics
- MVP: (Mozambique) Leia Dongue
- Top scorer: (Sudan) Chan 26.3
- Top rebounds: (Sudan) Chan 11.7
- Top assists: (Angola) I.Francisco 3.8
- PPG (Team): (Angola) 1º d'Agosto 74.8
- RPG (Team): (Angola) 1º d'Agosto 36
- APG (Team): (Angola) 1º d'Agosto 15.1

Official website
- 2015 FIBA Africa Women's Clubs Champions Cup

The 2015 FIBA Africa Women's Clubs Champions Cup (21st edition), was an international basketball tournament that took place at the Pavilhão Multiusos do Kilamba, in Luanda, Angola, from November 27 to December 6, 2015. The tournament, organized by FIBA Africa and hosted by Grupo Desportivo do Maculusso, was contested by 12 teams split into 2 groups, the first four of each group qualifying for the knock-out stage (quarter, semis and final).

The tournament was won by Primeiro de Agosto from Angola.

== Draw ==
Group A	Group B
(Burundi) Berco Stars (Nigeria) Dolphins (Cameroon) INJS (Angola) C.D. Maculusso (Angola) Primeiro de Agosto (Democratic Republic of the Congo) Radi	(Mozambique) Ferroviário de Maputo (Nigeria) First Bank (Democratic Republic of the Congo) I.N.S.S. (Angola) Interclube (Uganda) KCCA Leopards (Kenya) USIU Flames

== Preliminary rounds ==
Times given below are in local WAT (UTC+1).

Qualified for the quarter-finals
Relegated to the 9-12 classification

=== Group A ===
	Teams	M	W	L	PF	PA	Diff	P
1.	(Angola) Primeiro de Agosto	5	5	0	398	198	+200	10
2.	(Nigeria) Dolphins	5	4	1	374	317	+57	9
3.	(Cameroon) INJS	5	3	2	248	252	-4	8
4.	(Democratic Republic of the Congo) Radi	5	2	3	257	285	-28	7
5.	(Angola) C.D. Maculusso	5	1	4	261	321	-60	6
6.	(Burundi) Berco Stars	5	0	5	256	421	-165	5

27 November 2015
16:00

Boxscore

Berco Stars (Burundi)	61–67	(Angola) Maculusso
Scoring by quarter: 13-12, 21-20, 12-10, 15-25
Pts: Kalume 35; Rebs: Kalume 11; Asts: Bucumi 2		Pts: Elisabeth 15; Rebs: Matiquite, Judith 5 Asts: Elisabeth 3

Multiusos do Kilamba, Luanda

30 November 2015
14:00

Boxscore

Radi (Democratic Republic of the Congo)	57–68	(Nigeria) Dolphins
Scoring by quarter: 14-5, 14-12, 18-21, 11-30
Pts: Nyota 19; Rebs: Nyota 4 Asts: Mubalo 5		Pts: Okah 15; Rebs: Okpe 9 Asts: Okpe 8

Multiusos do Kilamba, Luanda

18:00

Boxscore

INJS (Cameroon)	40–58	(Angola) 1º de Agosto
Scoring by quarter: 13-15, 2-19, 13-18, 12-6
Pts: Ayangma 13; Rebs: Njiogap 7 Asts: five players 1		Pts: Leia 16; Rebs: Luísa 8 Asts: Isabel 3

Multiusos do Kilamba, Luanda

28 November 2015
16:00

Boxscore

Maculusso (Angola)	58–85	(Nigeria) Dolphins
Scoring by quarter: 14-19, 13-17, 20-27, 11-22
Pts: Joana 12; Rebs: Elisabeth 4 Asts: Ruth 4		Pts: Fofana 18; Rebs: Fofana 8 Asts: Okpe 4

Multiusos do Kilamba, Luanda

20:00

Boxscore

Berco Stars (Burundi)	25–119	(Angola) 1º de Agosto
Scoring by quarter: 6-29, 2-24, 11-35, 6-31
Pts: Iziguriza 8 Rebs: Kantungeko 6 Asts: four players 1		Pts: Leia 25; Rebs: Luísa 9 Asts: Fineza 6

Multiusos do Kilamba, Luanda

3 December 2015
11:00

Boxscore

Radi (Democratic Republic of the Congo)	33–46	(Cameroon) INJS
Scoring by quarter: 12-11, 9-15, 7-4, 5-16
Pts: Mubalo 10; Rebs: Nyota 6 Asts: Kalombo 2		Pts: Mbiandja 12; Rebs: Ayangma 5 Asts: Ayangma 3

Multiusos do Kilamba, Luanda

29 November 2015
12:00

Boxscore

Berco Stars (Burundi)	41–69	(Democratic Republic of the Congo) Radi
Scoring by quarter: 9-11, 11-15, 7-25, 14-18
Pts: Nezerwa 18; Rebs: Nezerwa 8 Asts: Bucumi 3		Pts: Nyota 21; Rebs: Nyota 15; Asts: Nguz 4

Multiusos do Kilamba, Luanda

16:00

Boxscore

Dolphins (Nigeria)	56–46	(Cameroon) INJS
Scoring by quarter: 22-15, 10-7, 16-8, 8-16
Pts: Fofana 12; Rebs: Currency 7 Asts: Olaosebikan 7		Pts: Njiogap, Njoya 9 Rebs: Njiogap, Ayangma 5 Asts: Ayangma 2

Multiusos do Kilamba, Luanda

20:00

Boxscore

1º de Agosto (Angola)	58–37	(Angola) Maculusso
Scoring by quarter: 17-11, 17-7, 11-13, 13-6
Pts: Leia 19; Rebs: Sónia 5 Asts: Fineza 3		Pts: Vunge 11; Rebs: Matiquite 5 Asts: Analzira, Elisabeth 2

Multiusos do Kilamba, Luanda

1 December 2015
10:00

Boxscore

Dolphins (Nigeria)	105–75	(Burundi) Berco Stars
Scoring by quarter: 24-18, 21-24, 25-16, 35-17
Pts: Currency 27; Rebs: Fofana 17; Asts: Currency 5		Pts: Haringanji 26; Rebs: Nezerwa 7 Asts: Bucumi 5

Multiusos do Kilamba, Luanda

14:00

Boxscore

Maculusso (Angola)	51–55	(Cameroon) INJS
Scoring by quarter: 8-11, 8-9, 14-10, 19-19
Pts: Ruth 14; Rebs: Fula 12; Asts: Pascalina 2		Pts: Njiogap 19; Rebs: Njiogap 10; Asts: Njiogap 2

Multiusos do Kilamba, Luanda

18:00

Boxscore

Radi (Democratic Republic of the Congo)	36–82	(Angola) 1º de Agosto
Scoring by quarter: 7-30, 8-15, 6-22, 15-15
Pts: Nyota, Lukokesha 9 Rebs: Nyota, Kalombo 6 Asts: Lukokesha 2		Pts: Diarra 15; Rebs: Diarra 14; Asts: Leia 4

Multiusos do Kilamba, Luanda

2 December 2015
10:00

Boxscore

INJS (Cameroon)	61–54	(Burundi) Berco Stars
Scoring by quarter: 8-13, 15-17, 20-10, 18-14
Pts: Njiogap 23; Rebs: Ayangma 8 Asts: Mbiandja 5		Pts: Kalume 17; Rebs: Nezerwa 13; Asts: Bucumi 3

Multiusos do Kilamba, Luanda

14:00

Boxscore

Maculusso (Angola)	48–62	(Democratic Republic of the Congo) Radi
Scoring by quarter: 16-16, 11-15, 5-12, 16-19
Pts: Zuluca 14; Rebs: Matiquite 7 Asts: Zuluca 2		Pts: Nyota 26; Rebs: Kalombo 10; Asts: three players 1

Multiusos do Kilamba, Luanda

18:00

Boxscore

1º de Agosto (Angola)	81–60	(Nigeria) Dolphins
Scoring by quarter: 23-17, 21-15, 19-16, 18-12
Pts: Diarra 17; Rebs: Leia 6 Asts: Isabel 3		Pts: Fofana, Currency 13; Rebs: Fofana 9 Asts: Okpe 4

Multiusos do Kilamba, Luanda

Qualified for the quarter-finals
Relegated to the 9-12 classification

=== Group B ===
	Teams	M	W	L	PF	PA	Diff	P
1.	(Angola) Interclube	5	4	1	363	237	+126	9
2.	(Nigeria) First Bank	5	4	1	385	338	+47	9
3.	(Mozambique) Ferroviário de Maputo	5	4	1	323	294	+29	9
4.	(Democratic Republic of the Congo) I.N.S.S.	5	2	3	330	349	-19	7
5.	(Uganda) KCCA Leopards	5	1	4	272	353	-81	6
6.	(Kenya) USIU Flames	5	0	5	285	387	-102	5

27 November 2015
18:00

Boxscore

I.N.S.S. (Democratic Republic of the Congo)	44–56	(Angola) Interclube
Scoring by quarter: 12-17, 8-18, 13-6, 11-15
Pts: Nyoka 14; Rebs: Haongi 6 Asts: Maweja 3		Pts: Lucas 16; Rebs: Angelina, Nadir 6 Asts: Holmes 5

Multiusos do Kilamba, Luanda

20:00

Boxscore

USIU Flames (Kenya)	64–69	(Mozambique) Ferroviário
Scoring by quarter: 7-18, 15-15, 17-21, 25-15
Pts: Chan 43; Rebs: Chan 12; Asts: M.Otieno, Irankunda 3		Pts: Mafanela 12; Rebs: Mafanela 7 Asts: Ornélia 6

Multiusos do Kilamba, Luanda

30 November 2015
16:00

Boxscore

KCCA Leopards (Uganda)	71–87	(Nigeria) First Bank
Scoring by quarter: 21-27, 15-25, 16-25, 19-20
Pts: Soigi 18; Rebs: Nyafwono 9 Asts: Oketcho 2		Pts: Ekworomadu 18; Rebs: Atosu 12; Asts: Atosu 9

Multiusos do Kilamba, Luanda

28 November 2015
12:00

Boxscore

I.N.S.S. (Democratic Republic of the Congo)	74–80	(Nigeria) First Bank
Scoring by quarter: 13-24, 27-18, 18-20, 16-18
Pts: Haongi 24; Rebs: Haongi 9 Asts: Nyoka, Kanku 3		Pts: Akashili 22; Rebs: Iornumbe 8 Asts: A.Traoré 4

Multiusos do Kilamba, Luanda

14:00

Boxscore

USIU Flames (Kenya)	47–57	(Uganda) KCCA Leopards
Scoring by quarter: 13-13, 7-14, 19-7, 8-23
Pts: G.Otieno 12; Rebs: Chan 10; Asts: M.Otieno 5		Pts: Sokuton 15; Rebs: Namuwaya 19; Asts: Nantalo, Gimbo 2

Multiusos do Kilamba, Luanda

18:00

Boxscore

Interclube (Angola)	63–64	(Mozambique) Ferroviário
Scoring by quarter: 24-16, 10-22, 16-12, 13-14
Pts: Lucas 16; Rebs: Nadir 10; Asts: Holmes 5		Pts: A.Jaime 18; Rebs: Madu 12; Asts: Ornélia 5

Multiusos do Kilamba, Luanda

29 November 2015
10:00

Boxscore

Ferroviário (Mozambique)	62–47	(Uganda) KCCA Leopards
Scoring by quarter: 6-13, 16-17, 19-12, 21-5
Pts: A.Jaime 19; Rebs: Madu 8 Asts: Ornélia 3		Pts: Oketcho 15; Rebs: Namuwaya 12; Asts: Oketcho 2

Multiusos do Kilamba, Luanda

14:00

Boxscore

I.N.S.S. (Democratic Republic of the Congo)	85–80	(Kenya) USIU Flames
Scoring by quarter: 12-12, 18-27, 34-19, 21-22
Pts: Haongi 44; Rebs: Haongi 9 Asts: Nyoka, Teba 4		Pts: Chan 31; Rebs: Irankunda 10; Asts: M.Otieno, Irankunda 5

Multiusos do Kilamba, Luanda

18:00

Boxscore

First Bank (Nigeria)	66–70	(Angola) Interclube
Scoring by quarter: 16-14, 12-26, 24-7, 14-23
Pts: Atosu 18; Rebs: three players 4 Asts: Atosu 3		Pts: Lucas 26; Rebs: Nadir 12; Asts: Holmes, Salley 2

Multiusos do Kilamba, Luanda

1 December 2015
12:00

Boxscore

First Bank (Nigeria)	89–63	(Kenya) USIU Flames
Scoring by quarter: 21-12, 18-10, 25-26, 25-15
Pts: Atosu 23; Rebs: Daou 6 Asts: three players 3		Pts: Chan 32; Rebs: Chan 16; Asts: Irankunda 9

Multiusos do Kilamba, Luanda

16:00

Boxscore

Ferroviário (Mozambique)	68–57	(Democratic Republic of the Congo) I.N.S.S.
Scoring by quarter: 12-19, 21-17, 21-8, 14-13
Pts: A.Jaime 20; Rebs: Muianga 8 Asts: Muianga 4		Pts: Haongi 19; Rebs: Teba 4 Asts: Teba 3

Multiusos do Kilamba, Luanda

20:00

Boxscore

Interclube (Angola)	87–32	(Uganda) KCCA Leopards
Scoring by quarter: 27-2, 22-13, 14-9, 24-8
Pts: Lucas 16; Rebs: Nadir 10; Asts: Holmes 8		Pts: Oketcho 10; Rebs: Soigi 11; Asts: Siima 1

Multiusos do Kilamba, Luanda

2 December 2015
12:00

Boxscore

KCCA Leopards (Uganda)	65–70	(Democratic Republic of the Congo) I.N.S.S.
Scoring by quarter: 19-22, 7-12, 22-18, 17-18
Pts: Oketcho 22; Rebs: Sokuton 5 Asts: Oketcho 2		Pts: Haongi 28; Rebs: Haongi, Nyoka 4 Asts: Nyoka 5

Multiusos do Kilamba, Luanda

December 2015
16:00

Boxscore

First Bank (Nigeria)	63–60	(Mozambique) Ferroviário
Scoring by quarter: 10-17, 19-13, 13-9, 21-21
Pts: Atosu 19; Rebs: Udeaja, Akaraiwe 6 Asts: Atosu 4		Pts: A.Jaime 18; Rebs: Dionilde 6 Asts: Mahgaia 3

Multiusos do Kilamba, Luanda

December 2015
20:00

Boxscore

Interclube (Angola)	87–31	(Kenya) USIU Flames
Scoring by quarter: 27-4, 19-9, 21-12, 20-6
Pts: four players 11; Rebs: Angelina 4 Asts: Nadir, Ngiendula 3		Pts: Chan 19; Rebs: three players 3 Asts: Irankunda, Odhiambo 1

Multiusos do Kilamba, Luanda

== Knockout stage ==
Championship bracket

Quarter-finals
4 December 2015 - 20:30
(Democratic Republic of the Congo) I.N.S.S.	42
(Angola) 1º de Agosto	69
Fri 4 Dec 2015 - 15:45
(Cameroon) INJS	43
(Nigeria) First Bank	59
Fri 4 Dec 2015 - 18:00
(Democratic Republic of the Congo) Radi	40
(Angola) Interclube	74
Fri 4 Dec 2015 - 13:30
(Mozambique) Ferroviário	79
(Nigeria) Dolphins	74

Semi-finals
Sat 5 Dec 2015 - 20:30
(Angola) 1º de Agosto	62
(Nigeria) First Bank	48
Sat 5 Dec 2015 - 17:00
(Angola) Interclube	70
(Mozambique) Ferroviário	51

Final
Sun 6 Dec 2015 - 18:00
(Angola) 1º de Agosto	69
(Angola) Interclube	53
Third place
Sun 6 Dec 2015 - 15:30
(Tunisia) Ferroviário	71
(Nigeria) First Bank	54

5-8th bracket

5-8th Place
Sat 5 Dec 2015 - 13:30
(Democratic Republic of the Congo) I.N.S.S.	58
(Cameroon) INJS	47
Sat 5 Dec 2015 - 15:30
(Democratic Republic of the Congo) Radi	56
(Democratic Republic of the Congo) Dolphins	62

5th place
Sun 6 Dec 2015 - 13:15
(Democratic Republic of the Congo) I.N.S.S.	52
(Nigeria) Dolphins	59
7th place
Sun 6 Dec 2015 - 11:00
(Cameroon) INJS	58
(Democratic Republic of the Congo) Radi	53

9-12th bracket

9th-12th Place
Fri 4 Dec 2015 - 09:30
(Burundi) Berco Stars	62
(Uganda) KCCA Leopards	56
Fri 4 Dec 2015 - 09:30
(Kenya) USIU Flames	63
(Angola) Maculusso	48

9th place
Sat 5 Dec 2015 - 11:30
(Burundi) Berco Stars	69
(Nigeria) USIU Flames	67
11th place
Sat 5 Dec 2015 - 09:30
(Uganda) KCCA Leopards	65
(Angola) Maculusso	60

=== 9–12th place ===
4 December 2015
09:30

Boxscore

Berco Stars (Burundi)	62–56	(Uganda) KCCA Leopards
Scoring by quarter: 16-19, 10-8, 11-17, 25-12
Pts: Nezerwa 18; Rebs: Nezerwa 8 Asts: Bucumi 4		Pts: Oketcho 13; Rebs: Nyafwono 11; Asts: Oketcho 6

Multiusos do Kilamba, Luanda
Referees: António Bernardo (ANG), Francisco Tando (ANG), Erick Otieno (KEN)

11:30

Boxscore

USIU Flames (Kenya)	63–48	(Angola) Maculusso
Scoring by quarter: 16-13, 9-13, 27-12, 11-10
Pts: Chan 30; Rebs: Irankunda 14; Asts: M.Otieno 5		Pts: Pascalina 9 Rebs: five players 4 Asts: Elisabeth, Zuluca 2

Multiusos do Kilamba, Luanda
Referees: Augustin Ndayitwayeko (BDI), Laurie Meboung (CMR), Olusegun Adekanmbi (NGR)

=== Quarter finals ===
4 December 2015
13:30

Boxscore

Ferroviário (Mozambique)	79–74	(Nigeria) Dolphins
Scoring by quarter: 16-22, 21-19, 22-18, 20-15
Pts: Mafanela 20; Rebs: Mafanela, Madu 4 Asts: Ingvild 4		Pts: Okpe 28; Rebs: Currency 8 Asts: three players 3

Multiusos do Kilamba, Luanda

15:45

Boxscore

INJS (Cameroon)	43–59	(Nigeria) First Bank
Scoring by quarter: 8-14, 11-13, 15-14, 9-18
Pts: Mbiandja 10; Rebs: Njoya 8 Asts: Njiogap 3		Pts: Udeaja 15; Rebs: Udeaja 15; Asts: Atosu 2

Multiusos do Kilamba, Luanda
Referees: Artur de Castro (MOZ), Peter Kirabo (UGA), Mulanda Tshilenge (COD)

18:00

Boxscore

Radi (Democratic Republic of the Congo)	40–74	(Angola) Interclube
Scoring by quarter: 9-17, 14-21, 8-17, 9-19
Pts: Mubalo 13; Rebs: Mubalo, Nyota 5 Asts: Nyota, Lukokesha 2		Pts: Rosemira 14; Rebs: Angelina 8 Asts: three players 3

Multiusos do Kilamba, Luanda
Referees: Annie Muchenu (ZIM), Buyiswa Tshemese (RSA), Olusegun Adekanmbi (NGR)

20:30

Boxscore

I.N.S.S. (Democratic Republic of the Congo)	42–69	(Angola) 1º de Agosto
Scoring by quarter: 9-24, 15-12, 8-18, 10-15
Pts: Haongi 13; Rebs: Maweja 5 Asts: Nyoka, Tebapale 3		Pts: Leia 16; Rebs: Leia 9 Asts: Isabel 5

Multiusos do Kilamba, Luanda
Referees: Olusegun Adekanmbi (NGR), Nadège Zouzou (CIV), Erick Otieno (KEN)

=== 11th place ===
5 December 2015
09:30

Boxscore

Maculusso (Angola)	60–65	(Uganda) KCCA Leopards
Scoring by quarter: 16-17, 13-14, 19-12, 12-22
Pts: Matiquite, Elisabeth 15; Rebs: Matiquite 9 Asts: three players 2		Pts: Oketcho 20; Rebs: Soigi, Namuwaya 10; Asts: Oketcho, Nabasumba 2

Multiusos do Kilamba, Luanda
Referees: Mulanda Tshilenge (COD), Augustin Ndayitwayeko (BDI), Erick Otieno (KEN)

=== 9th place ===
5 December 2015
11:30

Boxscore

USIU Flames (Kenya)	67–69	(Burundi) Berco Stars
Scoring by quarter: 9-5, 19-22, 21-21, 18-21
Pts: Chan 19; Rebs: Chan 19; Asts: Chan, M.Otieno 3		Pts: Kalume 27; Rebs: Kalume 6 Asts: Kalume, Bucumi 3

Multiusos do Kilamba, Luanda

=== 5th-8th place ===
5 December 2015
13:30

Boxscore

I.N.S.S. (Democratic Republic of the Congo)	58–47	(Cameroon) INJS
Scoring by quarter: 13-9, 17-13, 11-12, 17-13
Pts: Nyoka 21; Rebs: Teba 4 Asts: Nyoka, Londa 2		Pts: Mbiandja 12; Rebs: Mbiandja 7 Asts: Nkeumo 1

Multiusos do Kilamba, Luanda
Referees: Artur de Castro (MOZ), Francisco Tando (ANG), Buyiswa Tshemese (RSA)

15:30

Boxscore

Radi (Democratic Republic of the Congo)	56–62	(Nigeria) Dolphins
Scoring by quarter: 10-21, 13-13, 14-18, 19-10
Pts: Nyota 29; Rebs: Nyota 12; Asts: Lukokesha 2		Pts: Okpe 15; Rebs: Fofana 9 Asts: Okpe 3

Multiusos do Kilamba, Luanda
Referees: António Bernardo (ANG), Osvaldo Neto (ANG), Augustin Ndayitwayeko (BDI)

=== Semifinals ===
5 December 2015
18:00

Boxscore

Interclube (Angola)	70–51	(Mozambique) Ferroviário
Scoring by quarter: 13-9, 12-19, 23-13, 22-10
Pts: Nadir 15; Rebs: Nadir 10; Asts: Holmes 5		Pts: Mafanela 12; Rebs: Madu 7 Asts: A.Jaime 4

Multiusos do Kilamba, Luanda
Referees: Chahinaz Bousseta (MAR), Nadège Zouzou (CIV), Dorothy Okatch (BOT)

20:30

Boxscore

1º de Agosto (Angola)	62–48	(Nigeria) First Bank
Scoring by quarter: 10-11, 20-10, 15-15, 17-12
Pts: Sónia 17; Rebs: Leia, Diarra 12; Asts: Isabel 4		Pts: Atosu 20; Rebs: Akaraiwe 9 Asts: Atosu 2

Multiusos do Kilamba, Luanda
Referees: Annie Muchenu (ZIM), Ingrid Essia (GAB), Peter Kirabo (UGA)

=== 7th place ===
6 December 2015
11:00

Boxscore

INJS (Cameroon)	58–53	(Democratic Republic of the Congo) Radi
Scoring by quarter: 18-11, 13-16, 15-17, 12-9
Pts: Mbiandja 21; Rebs: Ayangma 5 Asts: Mbiandja 3		Pts: Mubalo 20; Rebs: Mubalo 8 Asts: Ilunga, Matokio 2

Multiusos do Kilamba, Luanda
Referees: Olayinka Famogbiyele (NGR), Erick Otieno (KEN), Olusegun Adekanmbi (NGR)

=== 5th place ===
6 December 2015
13:15

Boxscore

I.N.S.S. (Democratic Republic of the Congo)	52–59	(Nigeria) Dolphins
Scoring by quarter: 7-17, 14-11, 18-13, 13-18
Pts: Nyoka 15; Rebs: Haongi 8 Asts: four players 2		Pts: Okpe 16; Rebs: Fofana 11; Asts: Olaosebikan 6

Multiusos do Kilamba, Luanda
Referees: Artur de Castro (MOZ), Francisco Tando (ANG), Dorothy Okatch (BOT)

=== Bronze medal game ===
6 December 2015
15:30

Boxscore

First Bank (Nigeria)	54–71	(Mozambique) Ferroviário
Scoring by quarter: 10-15, 13-15, 14-24, 17-17
Pts: Udeaja, Atosu 13; Rebs: Udeaja, Chinyere 5 Asts: Atosu 5		Pts: A.Jaime 16; Rebs: Mafanela 7 Asts: Ornélia 6

Multiusos do Kilamba, Luanda
Referees: António Bernardo (ANG), Osvaldo Neto (ANG), Ingrid Essia (GAB)

=== Gold medal game ===
6 December 2015
18:00

Boxscore

1º de Agosto (Angola)	69–53	(Angola) Interclube
Scoring by quarter: 17-5, 13-11, 20-19, 19-18
Pts: Leia 28; Rebs: Leia 18; Asts: Isabel 8		Pts: Lucas, Nadir 11; Rebs: Ngiendula 7 Asts: Lucas 4

Multiusos do Kilamba, Luanda
Referees: Chahinaz Bousseta (MAR), Annie Muchenu (ZIM), Nadège Zouzou (CIV)

== Final standings ==
Rank	Team	Record
Gold medal	(Angola) Primeiro de Agosto	8–0
Silver medal	(Angola) Interclube	6–2
Bronze medal	(Mozambique) Ferroviário de Maputo	6–2
4.	(Nigeria) First Bank	5–3
5.	(Nigeria) Dolphins	6–2
6.	(Democratic Republic of the Congo) I.N.S.S.	3–5
7.	(Cameroon) INJS	4–4
8.	(Democratic Republic of the Congo) Radi	2–6
9.	(Burundi) Berco Stars	2–5
10.	(Kenya) USIU Flames	1–6
11.	(Uganda) KCCA Leopards	2–5
12.	(Angola) C.D. Maculusso	1–6

== Statistical leaders ==
=== Individual Tournament Highs ===
Points

Rank	Name	G	Pts	PPG
1	(South Sudan) Sarah Chan	7	184	26.3
2	(Democratic Republic of the Congo) Ortice Haongi	8	163	20.4
3	(Burundi) Florence Kalume	6	110	18.3
4	(Mozambique) Leia Dongue	8	137	17.1
5	(Democratic Republic of the Congo) Mireille Nyota	8	129	16.1
6	(Nigeria) Upe Atosu	8	124	15.5
7	(Uganda) Flavia Oketcho	7	108	15.4
8	(Mozambique) Ana Jaime	8	120	15
9	(Democratic Republic of the Congo) Cecile Nyoka	8	118	14.8
10	(Angola) Italee Lucas	8	115	14.4

Rebounds

Rank	Name	G	Rbs	RPG
1	(South Sudan) Sarah Chan	7	82	11.7
2	(Uganda) Muhayimina Namuwaya	7	62	8.9
2	(Ivory Coast) Minata Fofana	8	70	8.8
4	(Mozambique) Leia Dongue	8	65	8.1
5	(Senegal) Maimouna Diarra	8	62	7.8
6	(Democratic Republic of the Congo) Mireille Nyota	8	60	7.5
7	(Angola) Nadir Manuel	8	56	7
8	(Burundi) Inès Nezerwa	7	46	6.6
9	(Burundi) Cynthia Irankunda	7	44	6.3
10	(Nigeria) Priscilla Udeaja	8	47	5.9

Assists

Rank	Name	G	Ast	APG
1	(Nigeria) Upe Atosu	8	30	3.8
1	(Angola) Isabel Francisco	8	30	3.8
1	(United States) Sequoia Holmes	8	30	3.8
1	(Nigeria) Patience Okpe	8	30	3.8
5	(Burundi) Cynthia Irankunda	7	26	3.7
6	(Mozambique) Ornélia Mutombene	8	28	3.5
7	(Kenya) Melissa Otieno	7	24	3.4
8	(Nigeria) Tokunbo Olaosebikan	8	26	3.3
9	(Burundi) Pascasie Bucumi	7	20	2.9
10	(Angola) Italee Lucas	8	21	2.6

Steals

Rank	Name	G	Sts	SPG
1	(Nigeria) Patience Okpe	8	37	4.6
2	(South Sudan) Sarah Chan	7	28	4
3	(United States) Sequoia Holmes	8	28	3.5
3	(Democratic Republic of the Congo) Mireille Nyota	8	28	3.5
5	(Mozambique) Odélia Mafanela	8	26	3.3
5	(Mozambique) Ornélia Mutombene	8	26	3.3
7	(Mozambique) Leia Dongue	8	25	3.1
8	(Kenya) Isabel Francisco	8	23	2.9
8	(Cameroon) Astride Njiogap	8	23	2.9
10	(Burundi) Florence Kalume	6	17	2.8

Blocks

Rank	Name	G	Bks	BPG
1	(Ivory Coast) Minata Fofana	8	12	1.5
2	(Angola) Nadir Manuel	8	7	0.9
3	(South Sudan) Sarah Chan	7	5	0.7
3	(Burundi) Inès Nezerwa	7	5	0.7
5	(Angola) Ngiendula Filipe	8	5	0.6
5	(Nigeria) Grace Okonkwo	8	5	0.6
7	(United States) Sequoia Holmes	8	4	0.5
7	(United States) Ndidi Madu	8	4	0.5
7	(Angola) Luísa Tomás	8	4	0.5
10	(Democratic Republic of the Congo) Cecile Nyoka	8	3	0.4

Turnovers

Rank	Name	G	Tos	TPG
1	(Kenya) Melissa Otieno	7	44	6.3
2	(Burundi) Pascasie Bucumi	7	41	5.9
3	(Burundi) Cynthia Irankunda	7	39	5.6
3	(Burundi) Larissa Kantungeko	7	39	5.6
5	(Nigeria) Patience Okpe	8	43	5.4
6	(Uganda) Flavia Oketcho	7	37	5.3
7	(Nigeria) Upe Atosu	8	39	4.9
7	(Democratic Republic of the Congo) Nicole Mubalo	8	39	4.9
9	(South Sudan) Sarah Chan	7	32	4.6
10	(Democratic Republic of the Congo) Natacha Teba	8	35	4.4

2-point field goal percentage

Pos	Name	A	M	%
1	(Burundi) Florence Kalume	65	46	67.7
2	(Nigeria) Patience Okpe	56	35	62.5
3	(Mozambique) Leia Dongue	80	49	61.2
4	(Democratic Republic of the Congo) Ortice Haongi	103	63	61.2
5	(Democratic Republic of the Congo) Cecile Nyoka	62	35	56.5
6	(Mozambique) Odélia Mafanela	75	41	54.7
7	(South Sudan) Sarah Chan	125	68	54.4
8	(United States) Ndidi Madu	61	32	52.5
9	(Angola) Italee Lucas	60	31	51.7
10	(Uganda) Chemutai Sokuton	62	32	51.6

3-point field goal percentage

Pos	Name	A	M	%
1	(Angola) Ana Gonçalves	35	17	48.6
2	(Burundi) Belyse Haringanji	15	7	46.7
3	(Mozambique) Ana Jaime	61	28	45.9
4	(Democratic Republic of the Congo) Cecile Nyoka	20	9	45
5	(Mozambique) Rute Muianga	11	4	36.4
6	(Nigeria) Tokunbo Olaosebikan	48	17	35.4
7	(Angola) Italee Lucas	37	13	35.1
8	(Cameroon) Astride Njiogap	44	14	31.8
9	(Senegal) Aya Traoré	22	7	31.8
10	(Democratic Republic of the Congo) Ukete Lukokesha	16	5	31.2

Free throw percentage

Pos	Name	A	M	%
1	(Burundi) Cynthia Irankunda	22	19	86.4
2	(Nigeria) Priscilla Udeaja	37	31	83.8
3	(Angola) Feliciana Zuluca	23	19	82.6
4	(Nigeria) Juliet Currency	27	22	81.5
5	(Nigeria) Upe Atosu	60	44	73.3
6	(Democratic Republic of the Congo) Natacha Teba	26	18	69.2
7	(Uganda) Flavia Oketcho	58	40	69
8	(Angola) Felizarda Jorge	28	19	67.9
9	(South Sudan) Sarah Chan	62	42	67.7
10	(Cameroon) Priscilla Mbiandja	48	32	66.7

=== Individual Game Highs ===
Department	Name	Total	Opponent
Points	(Democratic Republic of the Congo) Ortice Haongi	44	(Kenya) USIU Flames
Rebounds	(South Sudan) Sarah Chan (Uganda) Muhayimina Namuwaya	19	(Burundi) Berco Stars (Kenya) USIU Flames
Assists	(Nigeria) Upe Atosu (Burundi) Cynthia Irankunda	9	(Uganda) KCCA Leopards (Nigeria) First Bank
Steals	(South Sudan) Sarah Chan	8	(Uganda) KCCA Leopards (Angola) Maculusso
Blocks	(South Sudan) Sarah Chan	5	(Angola) Maculusso
2-point field goal percentage	(Nigeria) Chinwe Okah	100% (6/6)	(Democratic Republic of the Congo) Radi
3-point field goal percentage	(Kenya) Melissa Otieno	100% (3/3)	(Nigeria) First Bank
Free throw percentage	(Nigeria) Upe Atosu (Nigeria) Priscilla Udeaja	100% (8/8)	(Kenya) USIU Flames (Mozambique) Ferroviário de Maputo
Turnovers	(Cameroon) Sandrine Ayangma	11	(Nigeria) Dolphins

=== Team Tournament Highs ===
Points

Rank	Name	G	Pts	PPG
1	(Angola) 1º de Agosto	8	598	74.8
2	(Nigeria) Dolphins	8	569	71.1
3	(Angola) Interclube	8	560	70
4	(Nigeria) First Bank	8	546	68.3
5	(Mozambique) Ferroviário de Maputo	8	524	65.5
6	(Democratic Republic of the Congo) I.N.S.S.	8	482	60.3
7	(Kenya) USIU Flames	7	415	59.3
8	(Uganda) KCCA Leopards	7	393	56.1
9	(Burundi) Berco Stars	7	387	55.3
10	(Angola) Maculusso	7	369	52.7

Rebounds

Rank	Name	G	Rbs	RPG
1	(Angola) 1º de Agosto	8	288	36
2	(Uganda) KCCA Leopards	7	245	35
3	(Nigeria) Dolphins	8	275	34.4
3	(Angola) Interclube	8	275	34.4
5	(Kenya) USIU Flames	7	240	34.3
6	(Nigeria) First Bank	8	267	33.4
7	(Mozambique) Ferroviário de Maputo	8	236	29.5
8	(Angola) Maculusso	7	206	29.4
9	(Cameroon) INJS	8	232	29
10	(Democratic Republic of the Congo) Radi	8	231	28.9

Assists

Rank	Name	G	Ast	APG
1	(Angola) 1º de Agosto	8	121	15.1
2	(Angola) Interclube	8	113	14.1
3	(Mozambique) Ferroviário de Maputo	8	102	12.8
4	(Nigeria) Dolphins	8	98	12.3
5	(Kenya) USIU Flames	7	75	10.7
6	(Nigeria) First Bank	8	78	9.8
6	(Democratic Republic of the Congo) I.N.S.S.	8	78	9.8
8	(Burundi) Berco Stars	7	63	9
9	(Cameroon) INJS	8	52	6.5
10	(Democratic Republic of the Congo) Radi	8	50	6.3

Steals

Rank	Name	G	Sts	SPG
1	(Angola) 1º de Agosto	8	147	18.4
2	(Angola) Interclube	8	138	17.3
3	(Nigeria) Dolphins	8	131	16.4
4	(Mozambique) Ferroviário de Maputo	8	124	15.5
5	(Cameroon) INJS	8	117	14.6
6	(Democratic Republic of the Congo) Radi	8	116	14.5
7	(Kenya) USIU Flames	7	89	12.7
8	(Nigeria) First Bank	8	97	12.1
9	(Uganda) KCCA Leopards	7	85	12.1
10	(Angola) Maculusso	7	82	11.7

Blocks

Rank	Name	G	Bks	BPG
1	(Nigeria) Dolphins	8	20	2.5
2	(Angola) Interclube	8	18	2.2
3	(Burundi) Berco Stars	7	10	1.4
4	(Mozambique) Ferroviário de Maputo	8	10	1.2
5	(Democratic Republic of the Congo) I.N.S.S.	8	8	1
5	(Cameroon) INJS	8	8	1
7	(Kenya) USIU Flames	7	7	1
8	(Angola) 1º de Agosto	8	7	0.9
9	(Angola) Maculusso	7	5	0.7
10	(Nigeria) First Bank	8	5	0.6

Turnovers

Rank	Name	G	Tos	TPG
1	(Burundi) Berco Stars	7	218	31.1
2	(Angola) Maculusso	7	211	30.1
3	(Democratic Republic of the Congo) Radi	8	224	28
4	(Kenya) USIU Flames	7	191	27.3
5	(Cameroon) INJS	8	204	25.5
6	(Uganda) KCCA Leopards	7	178	25.4
7	(Nigeria) Dolphins	8	202	25.3
8	(Democratic Republic of the Congo) I.N.S.S.	8	187	23.4
9	(Angola) Interclube	8	175	21.9
10	(Mozambique) Ferroviário de Maputo	8	171	21.4

2-point field goal percentage

Pos	Name	%
1	(Angola) Interclube	55.1
2	(Democratic Republic of the Congo) I.N.S.S.	53.8
3	(Angola) 1º de Agosto	52.6
4	(Mozambique) Ferroviário de Maputo	51.5
5	(Nigeria) First Bank	50.8
6	(Burundi) Berco Stars	48.6
7	(Nigeria) Dolphins	48
8	(Kenya) USIU Flames	47.6
9	(Angola) Maculusso	42.4
10	(Cameroon) INJS	42.3

3-point field goal percentage

Pos	Name	%
1	(Angola) 1º de Agosto	33.1
2	(Mozambique) Ferroviário de Maputo	32.2
3	(Burundi) Berco Stars	31.8
4	(Nigeria) Dolphins	30.5
5	(Angola) Interclube	26.7
6	(Cameroon) INJS	25.6
7	(Nigeria) First Bank	24.3
8	(Democratic Republic of the Congo) I.N.S.S.	23.8
9	(Uganda) KCCA Leopards	23.1
10	(Kenya) USIU Flames	22.9

Free throw percentage

Pos	Name	%
1	(Nigeria) First Bank	67.6
2	(Angola) Interclube	67.1
3	(Mozambique) Ferroviário de Maputo	62.2
4	(Nigeria) Dolphins	58.5
5	(Angola) Maculusso	58.3
6	(Uganda) KCCA Leopards	57.6
7	(Cameroon) INJS	56.6
8	(Democratic Republic of the Congo) I.N.S.S.	56.1
9	(Kenya) USIU Flames	55.8
10	(Angola) 1º de Agosto	54.7

=== Team Game highs ===
Department	Name	Total	Opponent
Points	(Angola) 1º de Agosto	119	(Burundi) Berco Stars
Rebounds	(Angola) Interclube (Kenya) USIU Flames	47	(Uganda) KCCA Leopards (Burundi) Berco Stars
Assists	(Angola) 1º de Agosto	29	(Burundi) Berco Stars
Steals	(Angola) 1º de Agosto (Angola) Interclube	26	(Burundi) Berco Stars (Democratic Republic of the Congo) I.N.S.S.
Blocks	(Nigeria) Dolphins (Kenya) USIU Flames	5	(Democratic Republic of the Congo) Radi (Angola) Maculusso
2-point field goal percentage	(Angola) Interclube	81.5% (22/27)	(Democratic Republic of the Congo) Radi
3-point field goal percentage	(Burundi) Berco Stars	75% (6/8)	(Cameroon) INJS
Free throw percentage	(Nigeria) First Bank	88.2% (15/17)	(Kenya) USIU Flames
Turnovers	(Burundi) Berco Stars	42	(Angola) 1º de Agosto

== All Tournament Team ==
G	(Angola)	Italee Lucas
F	(Mozambique)	Ana Jaime
F	(South Sudan)	Sarah Chan
C	(Mozambique)	Leia Dongue
C	(Senegal)	Maimouna Diarra

2015 FIBA Africa Women's Clubs Champions Cup winner

Clube Desportivo Primeiro de Agosto
2nd title

Team roster: Ana Gonçalves, Fineza Eusébio, Indira José, Isabel Francisco, Leia Dongue, Letícia André, Luísa Tomás, Marinela Muxiri, Maimouna Diarra,
Nacissela Maurício, Rosa Gala, Sónia Ndoniema
Head coach: Jaime Covilhã

Most Valuable Player
(Mozambique) Leia Dongue

== See also ==
- 2015 FIBA Africa Championship for Women
