= Jordan Sakho =

Congolese professional basketball player

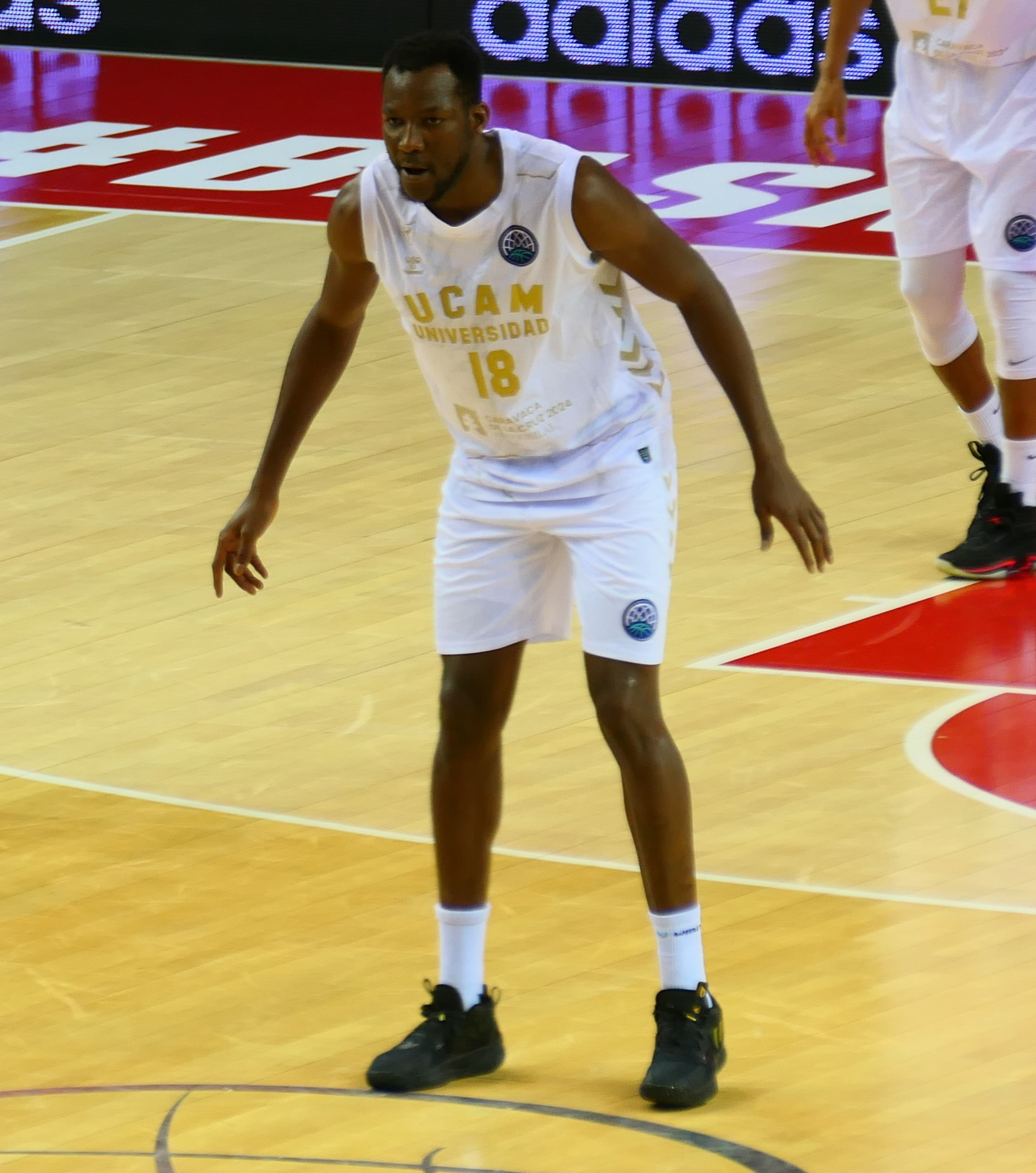
- Sakho with UCAM Murcia in 2022

No. 18 – Soles de Mexicali
- Position: Center
- League: LNBP

Personal information
- Born: 4 April 1997 (age 29) Kinshasa, Zaire
- Listed height: 2.07 m (6 ft 9 in)
- Listed weight: 105 kg (231 lb)

Career information
- Playing career: 2016–present

Career history
- 2016–2021: Manresa
- 2020–2021: →San Pablo Burgos
- 2021–2022: Breogán
- 2022–2024: UCAM Murcia
- 2024–2026: Breogán
- 2026–present: Soles de Mexicali

Career highlights
- 2× Champions League champion (2020, 2021); FIBA Intercontinental Cup champion (2021)

Jordan Djounorou Sakho (born 4 April 1997) is a Congolese professional basketball player for Soles de Mexicali of the Liga Nacional de Baloncesto Profesional (LNBP). He has represented the Congolese national team internationally.

== Early life and youth career ==
Sakho was born in Kinshasa in 1997. As a child, he played football and started playing basketball upon the insistence of his friends. Sakho's youth career started when he was invited to a youth tournament organized by Serge Ibaka's foundation in Brazzaville, Congo Republic. He then travelled to Madrid to join the youth ranks of AD Torrelodones. Sakho joined Bàsquet Manresa's youth ranks and played for an associated team, CB Martorell.

== Professional career ==
Sakho made his professional debut in 2016 with Bàsquet Manresa. He would later play for CB Breogán and UCAM Murcia.

In 2024, he became a CB Breogán player again. In the 2024-25 ACB season, Sakho earned the Player of the round award for round 16. In January 2025, he reached the milestone of 200 games in Liga ACB.

== National team career ==
Sakho is a part of the DR Congo national team, with who he won the AfroCan 2019. He also played at the AfroBasket tournament in 2021 and 2025.
