= Pavilhão Welwitschia Mirabilis =

Multisports indoor arena in Moçâmedes, Angola

- Interactive map of Pavilhão Welwitschia Mirabilis
- Location: Bairro Porco Russo, Moçâmedes, Angola
- Coordinates: 15.209827°S 12.158867°E
- Owner: State-owned
- Capacity: 3072
- Surface: Hardwood
- Scoreboard: Electronic

Construction
- Opened: 6 September 2013
- General contractor: Omatapalo

The Pavilhão Welwitschia Mirabilis is a state-owned multisports indoor arena located in Moçâmedes, Angola. The 3072-seat arena, features hardwood flooring, electronic scoreboard and a wide range of features that makes it one of the most modern of its kind in Africa. was built to host the 2013 World Roller Hockey World Championship alongside the Pavilhão Multiusos de Luanda. It is fit for such sports as Basketball, Handball, Volleyball and Roller Hockey.

The arena was named after Welwitschia, a plant endemic to the Namib desert in Angola with such a huge life span that some believe to be as long as 2000 years.
