= Mido Taha =

Egyptian basketball player (born 1996)

No. 2 – Al Ittihad Alexandria
- Position: Point guard
- League: Egyptian Basketball Premier League

Personal information
- Born: June 7, 1996 (age 30) Alexandria, Egypt
- Listed height: 1.80 m (5 ft 11 in)

Career history
- present: Al Ittihad Alexandria
Medals
Men's 3x3 basketball
Representing Egypt
FIBA 3x3 Africa Cup
Silver medal – second place	2025 Antananarivo	Team

Mohamed Taha Ibrahim Abdelrahman Mohamed (Arabic: إبراهيم عبد الرحمن محمد طه) better known as Mido Taha (born June 7, 1998) is an Egyptian professional basketball player for Al Ittihad. He also plays for the Egypt national team. Standing at 1.80 m (5 ft 11 in), he plays as point guard.

== Professional career ==
Born and raised in the city of Alexandria, he started playing for the Al Ittihad Alexandria youth team at age 7. He later made his debut with the senior team in the Egyptian Basketball Premier League, where he has played since.

In the 2024–25 season, Taha made his debut in the Basketball Africa League (BAL) with Al Ittihad. However, in June, an injury ended his season early. On January 19, 2025, Taha extended his contract with three more seasons.

== National team career ==
Taha played with the Egypt national team Under-18 team at the 2014 FIBA Africa Under-18 Championship, as well as with the Under-19 team at the 2025 FIBA Under-19 Basketball World Cup. For the senior team, he debuted in 2018, and made his debut at a major tournament at FIBA AfroBasket 2025.
