= Christian Lutete =

American-Congolese basketball player (born 1996)

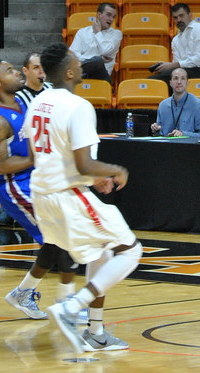

Maccabi Rehovot
- Position: Shooting guard
- League: Liga Leumit

Personal information
- Born: October 9, 1996 (age 30)
- Listed height: 6 ft 5 in (1.96 m)
- Listed weight: 200 lb (91 kg)

Career information
- High school: McKinley Tech (Washington, D.C.); Phillips Exeter Academy (Exeter, New Hampshire)
- College: Radford (2015–2017); UMass Lowell (2018–2020)
- NBA draft: 2020: undrafted
- Playing career: 2020–present

Career history
- 2020–2021: CSU Sibiu
- 2021: Bashkimi
- 2021–2022: Kobrat
- 2022–2023: ALM Évreux Basket
- 2023–2024: Hermine Nantes
- 2024–2025: Bosna
- 2025–2026: Estela
- 2026–present: Maccabi Rehovot

Career highlights
- 2x Second-team All-America East (2019, 2020)

Claude Christian Lutete IV (born October 9, 1996) is an American-Congolese professional basketball player for Maccabi Rehovot B.C. of the Liga Leumit. He also plays for the DR Congo men's national basketball team. Lutete played college basketball for Radford and UMass Lowell.

== Early life and high school career ==
Lutete grew up in Silver Spring, Maryland and attended McKinley Technology High School in Washington, D.C. He played a post-graduate year at Phillips Exeter Academy, which he said was one of his best decisions because it made him uncomfortable. Lutete averaged 17 points per game and was named to the All-NEPSAC Team. Lutete committed to Radford over offers from several Ivy League schools.

== College career ==
Lutute played sparingly during two seasons at Radford and made three starts. As a freshman, he averaged 2.9 points and 2.2 rebounds per game. Lutete averaged 4.5 points and 2.4 rebounds per game as a sophomore. Following his sophomore season, he transferred to UMass Lowell because a high school teammate was on the team. As a redshirt junior, Lutete averaged 18.7 points and 7.6 rebounds per game, shooting 53.4 percent from the field and 39.5 percent from behind the arc. He earned Second Team All-America East and All-Academic Team honors as well as being named to the National Association of Basketball Coaches (NABC) All-District 1 First Team. On November 8, 2019, Lutute scored a school-record 51 points and grabbed nine rebounds in an 87–74 victory over LIU. Lutete broke his left wrist during his senior season but did not tell anyone until the season was over. He averaged 19.3 points per game as a senior, second-best in the conference, as well as a team-high 7.0 rebounds per game. Lutete earned Second Team All-America East honors and was named to the Division I Academic All-America First Team. He was named America East Man of the Year due to his academic achievements in earning his master's degree in peace and conflict studies as well as mentoring District of Columbia College Access Program scholars.

== Professional career ==
On July 29, 2020, Lutete signed his first professional contract with CSU Sibiu of the Liga Națională. He averaged 8.6 points and 2.1 rebounds per game. On February 28, 2021, Lutete signed with Bashkimi Prizren of the Kosovo Basketball Superleague.

== National team career ==
Lutete made his debut for the DR Congo men's national basketball team in July 2022, in the 2023 FIBA Basketball World Cup qualification. On July 2, he scored 19 points and had 6 rebounds in a 72–60 win over Senegal. Lutete played at FIBA AfroBasket 2025 with Congo, and averaged 9.5 points per game as the team reached the quarter-final qualifiers.

== Personal life ==
Lutete is the son of Claude and Lishion Lutete and has an older sister, Bijou. His favorite basketball player is Kobe Bryant.
