= Hason Ward =

Barbadian basketball player (born 2000)

- Ward in 2026

No. 20 – Bamberg Baskets
- Position: Power forward
- League: Basketball Bundesliga

Personal information
- Born: September 24, 2000 (age 26) Saint Thomas, Barbados
- Listed height: 2.06 m (6 ft 9 in)
- Listed weight: 91 kg (201 lb)

Career information
- High school: Springfield Central (Springfield, Massachusetts)
- College: VCU (2019–2022); Iowa State (2022–2024)
- NBA draft: 2024: undrafted
- Playing career: 2024–present

Career history
- 2024: Scarborough Shooting Stars
- 2024–2026: Maine Celtics
- 2026: Reyer Venezia
- 2026–present: Bamberg Baskets

Career highlights
- Atlantic 10 All-Defensive team (2021)
- Stats at NBA.com
- Stats at Basketball Reference

Hason Devere Ward (born September 24, 2000) is a Barbadian-Rwandan professional basketball player for Bamberg Baskets of the German Basketball Bundesliga (BBL). He played college basketball for the VCU Rams and the Iowa State Cyclones.

== Early life and high school ==
In 2015, Ward visited Massachusetts with his father and was recruited to attend Springfield Central High School in Springfield, Massachusetts. He went to live with his aunt who lived in Springfield. He averaged 10.5 points, 6.3 rebounds and 2.2 blocks. He helped lead the team to the MIAA State Division I Quarterfinals. He blocked 22 shots in a single high school game as a junior.

== College career ==
=== Virginia Commonwealth University (2019–2022) ===
On May 16, 2019, Ward signed a National Letter of Intent with Virginia Commonwealth University. He chose VCU over offers from Rutgers University, University of Georgia, Virginia Tech and a number of other programs. During the 2019–2020 season, Ward played in 24 games and averaged 3 points, 2 rebounds and blocked 15 shots. During the 2020–2021 season, Ward appeared in all 26 games and started the final 11 games of the year. He averaged 6.4 points, 5.1 rebounds and 2.4 blocks per game. On March 10, 2021, Ward was named Atlantic 10 Conference All-Defensive Team as he was averaging 2.4 blocks per game, second in the conference.

=== Iowa State University (2022–2024) ===
On April 21, 2022, Ward transferred to Iowa State University. During the 2022–2023 season, Ward appeared in 23 games and led the team in field goal percentage. He was fourth on the team in blocked shots and second on the team with 18 dunks. During the 2023–2024 season, Ward appeared in 28 games with three starts. He missed nine non-conference games with a foot injury. He averaged 6 points and 3.8 rebounds. He was second on the teams in blocked shots with 33. On April 2, 2024, Ward was selected to participate in the Slam Dunk Contest at the annual State Farm College Slam Dunk and 3 Point Championship. Ward was the first Cyclone to participate in the Slam Dunk Contest.

== Professional career ==
=== Scarborough Shooting Stars (2024 & 2025) ===
On May 2, 2024, Ward signed with the Scarborough Shooting Stars of the CEBL. Appearing in twelve games for the Shooting Stars, Ward averaged 6 points and 3 rebounds and about 18 minutes per game.

On May 8, 2025, Ward re-signed with the Scarborough Shooting Stars.

=== Maine Celtics (2024–2026) ===
After going undrafted in the 2024 NBA draft, Ward joined the Sacramento Kings for the 2024 NBA Summer League and on October 16, 2024, he signed with the Boston Celtics, but was waived a day a later. On October 26, 2024, Ward joined the Maine Celtics.

Ward was named to the Maine Celtics 2025-26 opening night roster on November 6, 2025.

=== Reyer Venezia (2026) ===
On April 7, 2026, he signed with Reyer Venezia Mestre of the Italian Lega Basket Serie A (LBA).

== National team career ==
In July 2025, Ward was announced as a member of the preliminary roster for the Rwanda national team for AfroBasket 2025.

== Personal life ==
Ward is the son of Lasontha Sealy. He has a sister and a brother.
