= Milton Valente =

Angolan basketball player (born 1998)

No. 7 – Primeiro de Agosto
- Positions: Shooting guard, small forward
- League: Angolan Basketball League

Personal information
- Born: September 28, 1998 (age 28)
- Listed height: 1.98 m (6 ft 6 in)

Career history
- 2023–2024: Maia
- 2024–present: Primeiro de Agosto
Medals
Men's basketball
Representing Angola
U16 AfroBasket
Gold medal – first place	2013 Madagascar
AfroBasket
Gold medal – first place	2025 Angola

Milton Bande Valente (born 28 September 1998) is an Angolan professional basketball player for Primeiro de Agosto of the Angolan Basketball League and the Angola men's national basketball team. He won the gold medal with Angola at FIBA AfroBasket 2025.

== Professional career ==
Valente came through the youth ranks of C.D. Primeiro de Agosto. He spent the 2023–24 season in Portugal with Maia Basket Clube in the second-tier Proliga.

In November 2024, Valente returned to Primeiro de Agosto on a two-year contract. He later featured prominently in the Angolan league finals, including a game with 18 points, eight rebounds and four steals in Game 1 of the finals against Petro de Luanda.

== National team career ==
Valente represented Angola at age-group level at the 2013 FIBA Africa Under-16 Championship, where he won a gold medal, the 2014 FIBA Under-17 World Championship and the 2017 FIBA Under-19 Basketball World Cup.

At senior level, he was part of Angola’s gold-medal team at FIBA AfroBasket 2025. He played in all six games, averaging 7.5 points, 3.2 rebounds and 1.0 assists per game as Angola defeated Mali 70–43 in the final in Luanda. He played a large role in the team's semifinal victory over Cameroon.

== Honours ==
Angola

- FIBA AfroBasket 2025: Gold medal
