= Springfield Central High School =

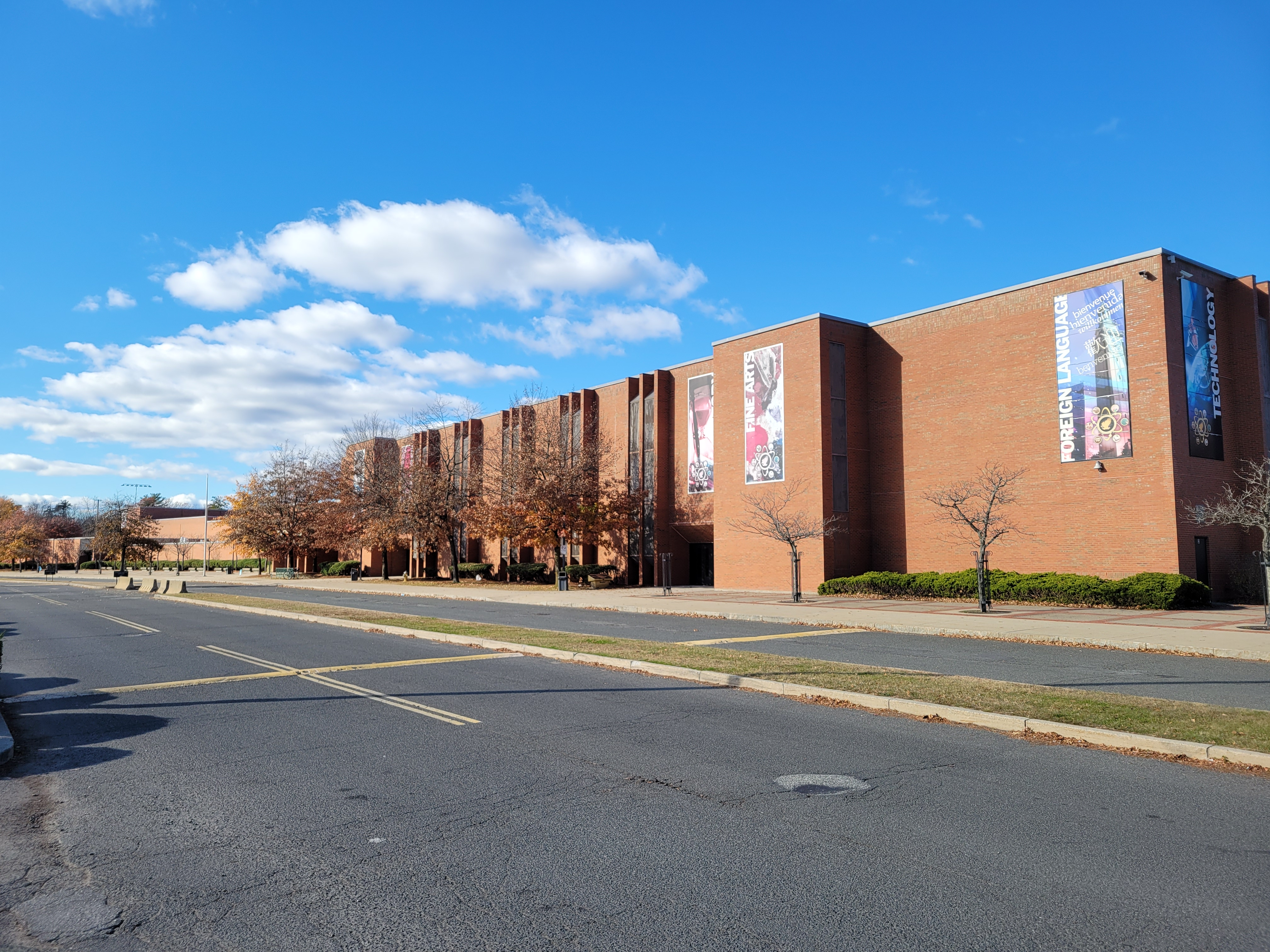

Location
- 1840 Roosevelt Avenue; Springfield, Massachusetts 01109; United States; 42.1312°N 72.5468°W

Information
- School type: Public
- Established: 1986; 40 years ago Merging two existing High schools: Classical-1898 High & Technical High-1905
- School district: Springfield Public Schools
- CEEB code: 222030
- Principal: Thaddeus Tokarz
- Teaching staff: 165.80 (FTE)
- Grades: 9–12
- Age range: 13–19
- Enrollment: 2,042 (2023–2024)
- Average class size: 18–25
- Student to teacher ratio: 12.32
- Hours in school day: 7:35 A.M. - 2:20 P.M.
- Campus type: Urban
- Colors: Black and Gold
- Slogan: Home of Scholars and Champions
- Athletics: MIAA - Division 1 West
- Athletics conference: AA League
- Mascot: Golden Eagles
- Accreditation: NEASC
- Newspaper: The Talon
- Yearbook: Signature
- Website: central.springfieldpublicschools.com

Springfield Central High School is a public high school located in Springfield, Massachusetts, United States. The high school is for students in grades 9–12. With an enrollment of more than 2,000 students, Springfield Central High School describes itself as the largest high school in western Massachusetts.

== History ==
Springfield Central High School opened in 1986. In 1986 two existing High schools merged campuses- Classical High and Technical High becoming the current campus of Springfield Central High School opened on September 3, 1986.

In 2008, the Springfield Public Schools created a mandatory district-wide uniform policy.

In 2010, Springfield Central retired jersey number 3 previously worn by basketball player Travis Best, who was a Parade magazine All-American and later played professionally in the NBA and internationally from 1995 to 2009.

== Arts ==
Springfield Central partners with Shakespeare & Company (Massachusetts) every year, participating in the annual Fall Festival of Shakespeare, which brings more than 500 high school students together each year for a nine-week, collaborative, non-competitive, celebratory exploration and production of multiple Shakespeare plays.

== Sports ==
- Fall
  - Soccer
  - Volleyball (Girls)
  - Football (Boys)
  - Golf (Boys)
  - Cross Country
  - Cheer
- Winter
  - Basketball
  - Swimming
  - Indoor Track
  - Wrestling
  - Cheer
- Spring
  - Baseball (Boys)
  - Softball (Girls)
  - Tennis
  - Track and Field
  - Volleyball (Boys)
  - Lacrosse (Boys)
  - Lacrosse (Girls)

Central also is home to the MA-O11 Air Force Junior Reserve Officer Training Corps (AFJROTC)wing.

=== Sports accomplishments ===
The 2012 boys basketball team won the state championship in division one and the football team won the 2012 Western Mass Super Bowl.

The Central Football team won the Division III State Championship for two consecutive years, 2018 and 2019.

The Air Force JROTC won the 2021 National Invitational Drill Competition, which was done virtually due to the COVID-19 pandemic.

The Central Football team won its first Division I State Championship in 2021.

== Notable alumni ==
- Travis Best (1991) - Former NBA player
- Isan Díaz (2014) - MLB player
- June Foray - Voice actress
- Edgar Padilla - Basketball player
- Hason Ward (2019) - Basketball player
- William Watson III (2023) - College football quarterback for the UMass Minutemen
