= Sarah Chan (basketball) =

South Sudanese basketball player and NBA scout

Sarah Zeinab Chan is a South Sudanese former professional basketball player and lead scout in Africa for the National Basketball Association's (NBA) Toronto Raptors, who grew up as a refugee in Kenya. She is the first woman to scout for an NBA team in Africa. She is also the founder of Home At Home/Apediet Foundation, a non-governmental organization that combats child marriage and advocates sports and education for girls. In 2022, Chan was named to the BBC 100 Women list.

== Early life and education ==
Chan grew up in Khartoum, Sudan, during the second Sudanese Civil War. She lived with her parents, two older brothers and younger sister alongside other families in a homestead that was "half-mud and half-brick". She speaks English, Swahili, Arabic, and Dinka.

In August 1998, her family fled to Nairobi, Kenya, where her parents received an academic sponsorship to study theology, as well as tuition for Sarah and her sister's education. Chan played sports for the first time in 2004 at Laiser Hill High School, where she quickly excelled in basketball.

In 2007, she moved to the US, and attended Union University in Jackson, Tennessee, on a basketball scholarship. There, she studied political science and history, and played on the school's National Association of Intercollegiate Athletics (NAIA) program. After playing professionally for a few years in Europe and Africa, she returned to Nairobi, where she pursued a master's degree in peace and conflict studies at United States International University Africa.

== Sports career ==
Standing at 6 ft 4 in (1.93 m) tall, Chan played the forward position. As a senior, she was named to the NAIA all-tournament team and a first-team NAIA All-American. Over four seasons at Union University, she scored 1,892 points and had 1,112 rebounds.

She tried out for the Women's National Basketball Association team Indiana Fever, but was not selected.

Chan continued playing basketball professionally in Spain and Portugal, and also played for clubs in Tunisia, Angola, and Mozambique. She subsequently returned to Kenya, where she played for the United States International University Africa. Chan was the top scorer and rebounder, and was in the 2015 FIBA Africa Women's Champions Cup All-Star Five, and also competed in the 2017 FIBA Africa Women's Clubs Champions Cup.

While coaching at a Giants of Africa basketball camp in Kenya in 2017, she was discovered by Toronto Raptors president Masai Ujiri, who followed her career and later hired her as a scout and basketball development associate. As the lead scout, Chan travels throughout Africa recruiting talent for the Raptors. She has also persuaded Ujiri to hold Giants of Africa camps in Juba, South Sudan, and Mogadishu, Somalia, to offer girls the opportunity to try basketball.

== Foundation ==
Chan started her charity, the Home At Home/Apediet Foundation, to provide mentoring to girls, prevent child marriage, and promote education and sports. It is a national non-governmental organization named after her mother.
