= Pavilhão Multiusos de Luanda =

Indoor arena in Belas, Angola

Helmarc Arena
- Arena do Quilamba
- Interactive map of Helmarc Arena
- Location: Belas, Angola
- Coordinates: 8.978635°S 13.283536°E
- Owner: State-owned
- Capacity: 12,720
- Surface: Hardwood
- Scoreboard: Electronic
- Record attendance: 13,000 in

Construction
- Opened: September 18, 2013
- General contractor: Omatapalo

The Helmarc Arena, also called Arena do Quilamba (Quilamba Arena), is a state-owned multi-purpose indoor arena used mostly for basketball in Belas, Angola. The arena has a seating capacity of 12,720, and features hardwood flooring, an electronic scoreboard and a wide range of features that make it one of the most modern of its kind in Africa. It is therefore fit for such sports as basketball, handball, volleyball and roller hockey.

The arena was originally built to host the 2013 Roller Hockey World Championship.

In 2017, the arena was sold out with 13,000 people attending the 2019 FIBA Basketball World Cup qualification game between the home nation and their neighbours of the Democratic Republic of Congo, a record at the time.

The court is located in the Quilamba neighborhood, and across the road to the Estádio 11 de Novembro.
