= 2025 Women's Basketball League Africa =

Basketball competition in the Africa region

Women's Basketball League Africa
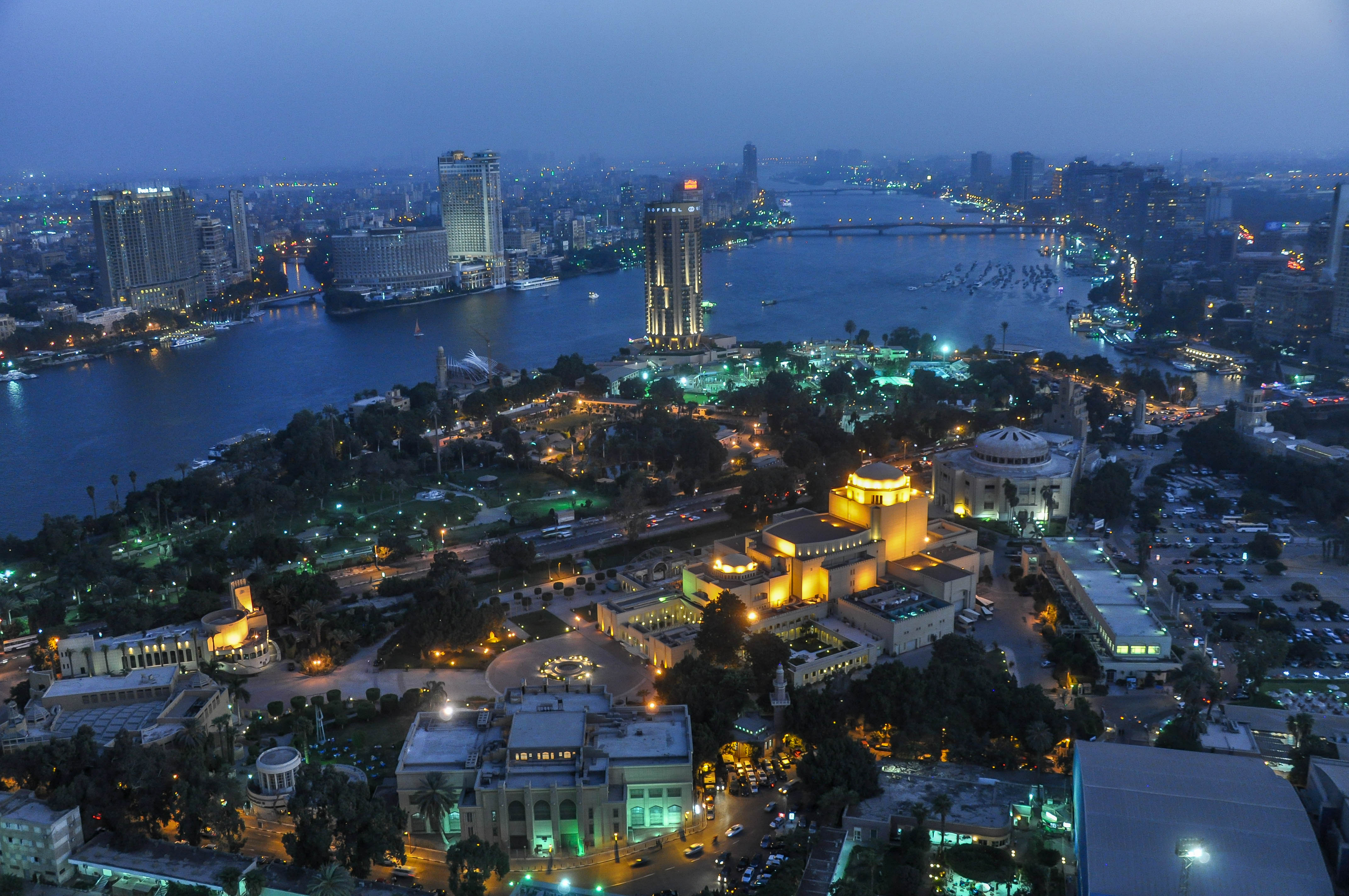
- The tournament was held in Cairo, Egypt.
- Season: 2025
- Dates: 5–14 December 2025
- Games played: 34
- Teams: Total: 12 (from 11 countries)

Regular season
- Season MVP: (Egypt) Raneem El-Gedawy

Finals
- Champions: (Egypt) Al Ahly (1st title)
- Runners-up: (Mozambique) Ferroviário de Maputo
- Third place: (Rwanda) APR
- Fourth place: (Senegal) ASC Ville de Dakar

Statistical leaders
- Points: (United States) Kayana Traylor (22.8 points per game)
- Rebounds: (Cameroon) Damaris Emédié (15.5 rebounds per game)
- Assists: (South Sudan) Delicia Washington (6.2 assists per game)

Records
- Highest scoring: Ferroviário de Maputo 91–76 KPA

The 2025 Women's Basketball League Africa was the 28th edition of the premier Africa women's club basketball championship organized by FIBA Africa. The tournament began on 5 December and ended on 14 December 2025.

The tournament was held in Egypt by Al Ahly, with the capital Cairo as the host city. This is Egypt's third time hosting after 2019 and 2023. It is also Cairo's third time hosting.

Ferroviário de Maputo were the defending champions after defeating Al Ahly 81–72 in the final in Dakar.

Al Ahly won their first title after beating Ferroviário de Maputo 77–51 in the final in Cairo.

== Qualification ==
Twelve teams qualified for the main tournament for the second time. Bravehearts became the first team from Malawi to progress to the main competition. In total, 23 clubs took part in qualification.

Event	Date	Location	Vacancies	Qualified
Host nation			1	(Egypt) Al Ahly
Defending champions			1	(Mozambique) Ferroviário de Maputo
Qualification Zone 2	14–16 November 2025	(Cape Verde) Praia	1	(Senegal) ASC Ville de Dakar
Qualification Zone 3	21–23 November 2025	(Ivory Coast) Abidjan	2	(Nigeria) First Bank (Ivory Coast) Friend’s Basketball Association
Qualification Zone 4	19–21 October 2025	(Democratic Republic of the Congo) Kinshasa	2	(Cameroon) FAP (Democratic Republic of the Congo) CNSS
Qualification Zone 5	9–15 November 2025	(Kenya) Nairobi	3	(Rwanda) APR (Rwanda) REG (Kenya) KPA
Qualification Zone 6	8–10 November 2025	(Namibia) Windhoek	2	(Angola) Sporting Clube de Luanda (Malawi) Bravehearts
Total			12	

== Venue ==
The venue is the Prince Abdallah Al Faisal Sports Hall in Cairo. It is owned by Al Ahly SC and it is used by the basketball, handball, and volleyball sections of the club. It was built in 1991 but renovated in 2020.

2025 Women's Basketball League Africa is located in Egypt	Cairo
2025 Women's Basketball League Africa is located in Egypt	Prince Abdallah Al Faisal Sports Hall
2025 Women's Basketball League Africa is located in Egypt	Capacity: 2,500

== Group stage ==
- The schedule was announced before the tournament started.

=== Classification of teams ===
1. Highest number of points earned, with each game result having a corresponding point:
  - Win: 2 points
  - Loss: 1 point
  - Loss by default: 1 point, with a final score of 2–0 for the opponents of the defaulting team if the latter team is not trailing or if the score is tied, or the score at the time of stoppage if they are trailing.
  - Loss by forfeit: 0 points, with a final score of 20–0 for the opponents of the forfeiting team.
2. Head-to-head record via points system above
3. Point difference in games among tied teams
4. Points for in games among tied teams
5. Point difference in all group games
6. Points for in all group games

=== Group A ===
Pos	Team	Pld	W	L	PF	PA	PD	Pts	Qualification
1	(Egypt) Al Ahly	3	3	0	265	187	+78	6	Quarterfinals
2	(Rwanda) REG	3	2	1	208	205	+3	5	Quarterfinals
3	(Angola) Sporting Clube de Luanda	3	1	2	194	193	+1	4	Quarterfinals
4	(Ivory Coast) Friend’s Basketball Association	3	0	3	155	237	−82	3	

Source: FIBA
Rules for classification: 1) Points; 2) Points difference; 3) Points scored.

5 December 2025
19:30

Boxscore

Friend’s Basketball Association (Ivory Coast)	62–91	(Egypt) Al Ahly
Scoring by quarter: 20–26, 12–22, 17–23, 13–20
Pts: Sangare 24; Rebs: Savadogo 7 Asts: Doumbia 9		Pts: Abdelgawad 18; Rebs: Amer 10; Asts: Washington 7

Prince Abdallah Al Faisal Sports Hall, Cairo
Attendance: 2,000
Referees: Arbia Belghith (TUN), Fanta Toure (MLI), Christelle Madjio Libawo (CMR)

6 December 2025
19:30

Boxscore

REG (Rwanda)	67–64	(Angola) Sporting Clube de Luanda
Scoring by quarter: 23–28, 11–16, 19–15, 14–5
Pts: Traylor 20; Rebs: Maiga 7 Asts: Traylor 5		Pts: Cunha 20; Rebs: Cunha 16; Asts: Mussol 6

Prince Abdallah Al Faisal Sports Hall, Cairo
Attendance: 120
Referees: Christelle Madjio Libawo (CMR), Fanta Toure (MLI), Syrine Nouir (TUN)

7 December 2025
17:00

Boxscore

Sporting Clube de Luanda (Angola)	65–40	(Ivory Coast) Friend’s Basketball Association
Scoring by quarter: 17–12, 14–10, 14–5, 20–13
Pts: Lhavanguane 26; Rebs: Covane 11; Asts: Lhavanguane 5		Pts: Sangare 18; Rebs: Touré 9 Asts: Sangare 2

Prince Abdallah Al Faisal Sports Hall, Cairo
Attendance: 300
Referees: Asmae Benkhadra (MAR), Fanta Toure (MLI), Wendy Mumbi Gichobi (KEN)

7 December 2025
19:30

Boxscore

Al Ahly (Egypt)	88–60	(Rwanda) REG
Scoring by quarter: 27–12, 18–14, 21–18, 22–16
Pts: Amer 18; Rebs: Amer 10; Asts: Mohamed, Washington 5		Pts: Traylor 22; Rebs: Butera 9 Asts: Amukamara 5

Prince Abdallah Al Faisal Sports Hall, Cairo
Referees: Arbia Belghith (TUN), Christelle Madjio Libawo (CMR), Imene Tahmi (ALG)

9 December 2025
14:30

Boxscore

REG (Rwanda)	81–53	(Ivory Coast) Friend’s Basketball Association
Scoring by quarter: 15–13, 24–12, 17–21, 25–7
Pts: Traylor 34; Rebs: King 19; Asts: Amukamara, King 4		Pts: Rice 20; Rebs: Cunningham 8 Asts: Diakite 6

Prince Abdallah Al Faisal Sports Hall, Cairo
Attendance: 80
Referees: Mame Medoune Ndiaye Dieye (SEN), Maria Bagnath (MOZ), Natascha Onono (RSA)

9 December 2025
19:30

Boxscore

Al Ahly (Egypt)	86–65	(Angola) Sporting Clube de Luanda
Scoring by quarter: 24–12, 19–22, 19–16, 24–15
Pts: Amer 25; Rebs: Amer 15; Asts: Abdelgawad 5		Pts: Cunha 21; Rebs: Chiziane 12; Asts: Mussol 6

Prince Abdallah Al Faisal Sports Hall, Cairo
Attendance: 1,500
Referees: Asmae Benkhadra (MAR), Christelle Madjio Libawo (CMR), Imene Tahmi (ALG)

=== Group B ===
Pos	Team	Pld	W	L	PF	PA	PD	Pts	Qualification
1	(Mozambique) Ferroviário de Maputo	3	3	0	238	167	+71	6	Quarterfinals
2	(Kenya) KPA	3	2	1	241	208	+33	5	Quarterfinals
3	(Nigeria) First Bank	3	1	2	159	219	−60	4	
4	(Cameroon) FAP	3	0	3	159	203	−44	3	

Source: FIBA
Rules for classification: 1) Points; 2) Points difference; 3) Points scored.

5 December 2025
15:30

Boxscore

FAP (Cameroon)	64–83	(Kenya) KPA
Scoring by quarter: 15–23', 13–21, 11–22, 25–17
Pts: Emédié 17; Rebs: Emédié 11; Asts: Akaraiwe 5		Pts: Dickey 23; Rebs: Doumbia 8 Asts: Doumbia 7

Prince Abdallah Al Faisal Sports Hall, Cairo
Attendance: 700
Referees: Imene Tahmi (ALG), Asmae Benkhadra (MAR), Mame Medoune Ndiaye Dieye (SEN)

6 December 2025
17:00

Boxscore

First Bank (Nigeria)	48–85	(Mozambique) Ferroviário de Maputo
Scoring by quarter: 7–34, 12–17, 15–19, 14–15
Pts: Ebiega 11; Rebs: Ogedengbe 11; Asts: Ebiega 4		Pts: Chiziane 22; Rebs: Mafanela, Mucauro 8 Asts: Mucauro 7

Prince Abdallah Al Faisal Sports Hall, Cairo
Referees: Asmae Benkhadra (MAR), Imene Tahmi (ALG), Mame Medoune Ndiaye Dieye (SEN)

7 December 2025
12:00

Boxscore

Ferroviário de Maputo (Mozambique)	62–43	(Cameroon) FAP
Scoring by quarter: 14–8, 15–15, 17–8, 16–12
Pts: Pitts 18; Rebs: Mucauro 13; Asts: Cook 5		Pts: Tientcheu 11; Rebs: Emédié 17; Asts: three players 2

Prince Abdallah Al Faisal Sports Hall, Cairo
Attendance: 120
Referees: Nadege Zouzou (CIV), Hendry Amosi (MWI), Olive Mukandanga (RWA)

7 December 2025
14:30

Boxscore

KPA (Kenya)	82–53	(Nigeria) First Bank
Scoring by quarter: 19–13, 26–11, 19–13, 18–16
Pts: Samassekou 20; Rebs: Johnson 8 Asts: Mwangale 6		Pts: Hembam 21; Rebs: Abel 7 Asts: Ebiega 3

Prince Abdallah Al Faisal Sports Hall, Cairo
Attendance: 120
Referees: Syrine Nouir (TUN), Mame Medoune Ndiaye Dieye (SEN), Laurindo Gama (ANG)

9 December 2025
12:00

Boxscore

FAP (Cameroon)	52–58	(Nigeria) First Bank
Scoring by quarter: 14–13, 12–13, 14–12, 12–20
Pts: Akaraiwe 11; Rebs: Emédié 13; Asts: Akaraiwe 5		Pts: Hembam 12; Rebs: Ogedengbe 10; Asts: Hembam 5

Prince Abdallah Al Faisal Sports Hall, Cairo
Attendance: 50
Referees: Yomna Arafa (EGY), Arbia Belghith (TUN), Léa Ndererimana (RWA)

9 December 2025
17:00

Boxscore

Ferroviário de Maputo (Mozambique)	91–76	(Kenya) KPA
Scoring by quarter: 25–19, 27–21, 10–25, 29–11
Pts: Mucauro 17; Rebs: Mafanela, Mucauro 9 Asts: Veloso 6		Pts: Johnson 24; Rebs: Johnson 12; Asts: Samassekou 9

Prince Abdallah Al Faisal Sports Hall, Cairo
Attendance: 1,000
Referees: Fanta Toure (MLI), Nadege Zouzou (CIV), Yomna Arafa (EGY)

=== Group C ===
Pos	Team	Pld	W	L	PF	PA	PD	Pts	Qualification
1	(Senegal) ASC Ville de Dakar	3	3	0	228	162	+66	6	Quarterfinals
2	(Rwanda) APR	3	2	1	252	181	+71	5	Quarterfinals
3	(Democratic Republic of the Congo) CNSS	3	1	2	178	193	−15	4	Quarterfinals
4	(Malawi) Bravehearts	3	0	3	124	246	−122	3	

Source: FIBA
Rules for classification: 1) Points; 2) Points difference; 3) Points scored.

6 December 2025
12:00

Boxscore

Bravehearts (Malawi)	42–66	(Democratic Republic of the Congo) CNSS
Scoring by quarter: 6–20, 8–16, 7–13, 21–17
Pts: Mabika 16; Rebs: Kaonga 17; Asts: Chella 3		Pts: Mbelu, Traore 13; Rebs: Traore 9 Asts: Mbelu 6

Prince Abdallah Al Faisal Sports Hall, Cairo
Attendance: 100
Referees: Yomna Arafa (EGY), Laurindo Gama (ANG), Wendy Mumbi Gichobi (KEN)

6 December 2025
14:30

Boxscore

ASC Ville de Dakar (Senegal)	78–71	(Rwanda) APR
Scoring by quarter: 19–24, 26–18, 17–11, 16–18
Pts: Matharu 22; Rebs: Fall 12; Asts: Ndong 6		Pts: Philoxy 18; Rebs: Uwizeye 12; Asts: Philoxy 7

Prince Abdallah Al Faisal Sports Hall, Cairo
Attendance: 80
Referees: Nadege Zouzou (CIV), Maria Bagnath (MOZ), Arbia Belghith (TUN)

8 December 2025
17:00

Boxscore

APR (Rwanda)	92–37	(Malawi) Bravehearts
Scoring by quarter: 25–4, 19–9, 26–14, 22–10
Pts: Diop 22; Rebs: Uwizeye 11; Asts: Lucas 9		Pts: Mabika 11; Rebs: Mabika 14; Asts: three players 2

Prince Abdallah Al Faisal Sports Hall, Cairo
Attendance: 50
Referees: Syrine Nouir (TUN), Nadege Zouzou (CIV), Asmae Benkhadra (MAR)

8 December 2025
19:30

Boxscore

CNSS (Democratic Republic of the Congo)	46–62	(Senegal) ASC Ville de Dakar
Scoring by quarter: 12–26, 15–8, 5–18, 14–10
Pts: three players 9 Rebs: Tounkara 8 Asts: Mbelu 4		Pts: Fall 14; Rebs: Fall 13; Asts: Ndong 5

Prince Abdallah Al Faisal Sports Hall, Cairo
Attendance: 100
Referees: Yomna Arafa (EGY), Maria Bagnath (MOZ), Laurindo Gama (ANG)

10 December 2025
17:00

Boxscore

Bravehearts (Malawi)	45–88	(Senegal) ASC Ville de Dakar
Scoring by quarter: 11–27, 10–27, 9–11, 15–33
Pts: Mabika 18; Rebs: Kadammanja 8 Asts: Mabika, Mazulu 3		Pts: Matharu 33; Rebs: Mbodj 18; Asts: Ndao, Niang 6

Prince Abdallah Al Faisal Sports Hall, Cairo
Referees: Léa Ndererimana (RWA), Wendy Mumbi Gichobi (KEN), Christelle Madjio Libawo (CMR)

10 December 2025
19:30

Boxscore

APR (Rwanda)	89–66	(Democratic Republic of the Congo) CNSS
Scoring by quarter: 20–10, 16–22, 26–22, 27–12
Pts: Diop 24; Rebs: Diop 11; Asts: Philoxy 6		Pts: Mbelu 18; Rebs: Tshoto 14; Asts: Tounkara 6

Prince Abdallah Al Faisal Sports Hall, Cairo
Referees: Natascha Onono (RSA), Maria Bagnath (MOZ), Nadege Zouzou (CIV)

=== Ranking of third place teams ===
Pos	Grp	Team	Pld	W	L	PF	PA	PD	Pts	Qualification
1	A	(Angola) Sporting Clube de Luanda	3	1	2	194	193	+1	4	Quarterfinals
2	C	(Democratic Republic of the Congo) CNSS	3	1	2	178	193	−15	4	Quarterfinals
3	B	(Nigeria) First Bank	3	1	2	159	219	−60	4	

Source: FIBA
Rules for classification: 1) Points; 2) Points difference; 3) Points scored.

== Knockout stage ==
=== Seeding ===
The quarterfinal matchups were based on the results of the group stage.

Pos	Team	Pld	W	L	PF	PA	PD	Pts	Qualification
1	(Egypt) Al Ahly	3	3	0	265	187	+78	6	Quarterfinals
2	(Mozambique) Ferroviário de Maputo	3	3	0	238	167	+71	6	Quarterfinals
3	(Senegal) ASC Ville de Dakar	3	3	0	228	162	+66	6	Quarterfinals
4	(Rwanda) APR	3	2	1	252	181	+71	5	Quarterfinals
5	(Kenya) KPA	3	2	1	241	208	+33	5	Quarterfinals
6	(Rwanda) REG	3	2	1	208	205	+3	5	Quarterfinals
7	(Angola) Sporting Clube de Luanda	3	1	2	194	193	+1	4	Quarterfinals
8	(Democratic Republic of the Congo) CNSS	3	1	2	178	193	−15	4	Quarterfinals
9	(Nigeria) First Bank	3	1	2	159	219	−60	4	Placement round
10	(Cameroon) FAP	3	0	3	159	203	−44	3	Placement round
11	(Ivory Coast) Friend’s Basketball Association	3	0	3	155	237	−82	3	Placement round
12	(Malawi) Bravehearts	3	0	3	124	246	−122	3	Placement round

Source: FIBA
Rules for classification: 1) Points; 2) Points difference; 3) Points scored.

=== Bracket ===
Quarterfinals
1 (Egypt) Al Ahly	98
8 (Democratic Republic of the Congo) CNSS	55
4 (Rwanda) APR	79
5 (Kenya) KPA	76
2 (Mozambique) Ferroviário de Maputo	66
7 (Angola) Sporting Clube de Luanda	58
3 (Senegal) ASC Ville de Dakar	68
6 (Rwanda) REG	48

Semifinals
1 (Egypt) Al Ahly	85
4 (Rwanda) APR	74
2 (Mozambique) Ferroviário de Maputo (OT)	71
3 (Senegal) ASC Ville de Dakar	65

Final
1 (Egypt) Al Ahly	77
2 (Mozambique) Ferroviário de Maputo	51
Third place game
4 (Rwanda) APR (OT)	90
3 (Senegal) ASC Ville de Dakar	84

==== Quarterfinals ====
12 December 2025
12:00

Boxscore

Ferroviário de Maputo (Mozambique)	66–58	(Angola) Sporting Clube de Luanda
Scoring by quarter: 17–13, 16–18, 17–10, 16–17
Pts: Veloso 19; Rebs: three players 7 Asts: Mucauro 7		Pts: Cunha 17; Rebs: Cunha 8 Asts: Lhavanguane 4

Prince Abdallah Al Faisal Sports Hall, Cairo
Referees: Arbia Belghith (TUN), Fanta Toure (MLI), Asmae Benkhadra (MAR)

12 December 2025
14:30

Boxscore

ASC Ville de Dakar (Senegal)	68–48	(Rwanda) REG
Scoring by quarter: 21–13, 20–16, 14–15, 13–4
Pts: Matharu 21; Rebs: Coulibaly 10; Asts: Ndong 8		Pts: Traylor 22; Rebs: Maiga 18; Asts: Traylor 6

Prince Abdallah Al Faisal Sports Hall, Cairo
Referees: Imene Tahmi (ALG), Christelle Madjio Libawo (CMR), Yomna Arafa (EGY)

12 December 2025
17:00

Boxscore

APR (Rwanda)	79–76	(Kenya) KPA
Scoring by quarter: 18–15, 24–17, 14–25, 23–19
Pts: Lucas 22; Rebs: Diop 12; Asts: Philoxy 8		Pts: Doumbia, Samassekou 19; Rebs: Johnson 9 Asts: Johnson 4

Prince Abdallah Al Faisal Sports Hall, Cairo
Referees: Nadege Zouzou (CIV), Natascha Onono (RSA), Syrine Nouir (TUN)

12 December 2025
19:30

Boxscore

Al Ahly (Egypt)	98–55	(Democratic Republic of the Congo) CNSS
Scoring by quarter: 30–21, 15–20, 24–10, 29–4
Pts: Amer 18; Rebs: El-Gedawy 11; Asts: Washington 9		Pts: Tounkara 13; Rebs: Tounkara 11; Asts: Mbelu 6

Prince Abdallah Al Faisal Sports Hall, Cairo
Referees: Maria Bagnath (MOZ), Léa Ndererimana (RWA), Mame Medoune Ndiaye Dieye (SEN)

==== Semifinals ====
13 December 2025
17:00

Boxscore

Ferroviário de Maputo (Mozambique)	71–65 (OT)	(Senegal) ASC Ville de Dakar
Scoring by quarter: 15–18, 8–16, 14–12, 22–13, Overtime: 12–6
Pts: Covane 16; Rebs: Mucauro 9 Asts: Veloso 9		Pts: Matharu 27; Rebs: Mbodj 11; Asts: Ndao 6

Prince Abdallah Al Faisal Sports Hall, Cairo
Attendance: 250
Referees: Arbia Belghith (TUN), Imene Tahmi (ALG), Christelle Madjio Libawo (CMR)

13 December 2025
19:30

Boxscore

Al Ahly (Egypt)	85–74	(Rwanda) APR
Scoring by quarter: 30–19, 20–15, 16–12, 19–28
Pts: Amer 25; Rebs: Amer 24; Asts: Oweis, Washington 5		Pts: Diop 23; Rebs: Diop, Philoxy 8 Asts: Diakité, Lucas 4

Prince Abdallah Al Faisal Sports Hall, Cairo
Attendance: 1,500
Referees: Nadege Zouzou (CIV), Fanta Toure (MLI), Laurindo Gama (ANG)

==== Third place ====
14 December 2025
17:00

Boxscore

APR (Rwanda)	90–84 (OT)	(Senegal) ASC Ville de Dakar
Scoring by quarter: 24–26, 18–22, 26–21, 16–15, Overtime: 6–0
Pts: Philoxy 31; Rebs: Diop, Lucas 7 Asts: Lucas 7		Pts: Dacosta 19; Rebs: Mbodj 16; Asts: Ndao 6

Prince Abdallah Al Faisal Sports Hall, Cairo
Attendance: 100
Referees: Christelle Madjio Libawo (CMR), Natascha Onono (RSA), Asmae Benkhadra (MAR)

==== Final ====
14 December 2025
19:30

Boxscore

Al Ahly (Egypt)	77–51	(Mozambique) Ferroviário de Maputo
Scoring by quarter: 29–17, 17–10, 11–20, 20–4
Pts: El-Gedawy 29; Rebs: El-Gedawy 18; Asts: Abdelgawad, Washington 7		Pts: Mafanela 11; Rebs: Mucauro 9 Asts: Veloso 6

Prince Abdallah Al Faisal Sports Hall, Cairo
Attendance: 2,500
Referees: Nadege Zouzou (CIV), Imene Tahmi (ALG), Fanta Toure (MLI)

=== 5–8 placement bracket ===
Semifinals
5 (Kenya) KPA	81
8 (Democratic Republic of the Congo) CNSS	66
6 (Rwanda) REG	55
7 (Angola) Sporting Clube de Luanda	62

Fifth place
5 (Kenya) KPA	67
7 (Angola) Sporting Clube de Luanda	74
Seventh place
8 (Democratic Republic of the Congo) CNSS	72
6 (Rwanda) REG	77

==== 5–8 Semifinals ====
13 December 2025
12:00

Boxscore

CNSS (Democratic Republic of the Congo)	66–81	(Kenya) KPA
Scoring by quarter: 19–26, 12–19, 9–21, 26–15
Pts: Tounkara 20; Rebs: Tounkara 6 Asts: Berthé, Tounkara 5		Pts: Samassekou 18; Rebs: Johnson 18; Asts: Mwangale 6

Prince Abdallah Al Faisal Sports Hall, Cairo
Referees: Natascha Onono (RSA), Mame Medoune Ndiaye Dieye (SEN), Asmae Benkhadra (MAR)

13 December 2025
14:30

Boxscore

Sporting Clube de Luanda (Angola)	62–55	(Rwanda) REG
Scoring by quarter: 22–10, 19–18, 8–9, 13–18
Pts: Cunha 18; Rebs: Ngungui 14; Asts: Cunha 5		Pts: King, Traylor 14; Rebs: King 11; Asts: Maiga, Traylor 3

Prince Abdallah Al Faisal Sports Hall, Cairo
Referees: Yomna Arafa (EGY), Syrine Nouir (TUN), Maria Bagnath (MOZ)

==== Seventh place game ====
14 December 2025
12:00

Boxscore

CNSS (Democratic Republic of the Congo)	72–77	(Rwanda) REG
Scoring by quarter: 18–14, 15–21, 18–16, 21–26
Pts: Iyomi, Traore 14; Rebs: Tounkara 9 Asts: Mbelu 7		Pts: Traylor 25; Rebs: King 18; Asts: Traylor 8

Prince Abdallah Al Faisal Sports Hall, Cairo
Attendance: 50
Referees: Maria Bagnath (MOZ), Syrine Nouir (TUN), Yomna Arafa (EGY)

==== Fifth place game ====
14 December 2025
14:30

Boxscore

KPA (Kenya)	67–74	(Angola) Sporting Clube de Luanda
Scoring by quarter: 17–17, 16–15, 24–23, 10–19
Pts: Dicket 20; Rebs: Wanyama 7 Asts: Samassekou 7		Pts: Lhavanguane 25; Rebs: Cunha 11; Asts: Cunha 4

Prince Abdallah Al Faisal Sports Hall, Cairo
Attendance: 200
Referees: Arbia Belghith (TUN), Léa Ndererimana (RWA), Mame Medoune Ndiaye Dieye (SEN)

=== 9–12 placement rounds ===
Ninth place game
(Nigeria) First Bank	42
(Cameroon) FAP	48

==== Nifth place game ====
11 December 2025
19:30

Boxscore

First Bank (Nigeria)	42–48	(Cameroon) FAP
Scoring by quarter: 8–15, 14–6, 7–12, 13–15
Pts: Isaac 8 Rebs: Ogedengbe 10; Asts: five players 2		Pts: Mogoun 14; Rebs: Emédié 21; Asts: Tientcheu 3

Prince Abdallah Al Faisal Sports Hall, Cairo
Referees: Yomna Arafa (EGY), Syrine Nouir (TUN), Hendry Amosi (MWI)

Eleventh place game
(Ivory Coast) Friend’s Basketball Association	72
(Malawi) Bravehearts	54

==== Eleventh place game ====
11 December 2025
17:00

Boxscore

Friend’s Basketball Association (Ivory Coast)	72–54	(Malawi) Bravehearts
Scoring by quarter: 23–17, 23–13, 20–14, 6–10
Pts: Sangare 29; Rebs: Rice 12; Asts: Savadogo 4		Pts: Mabika 17; Rebs: Kaonga 20; Asts: Kaunda 3

Prince Abdallah Al Faisal Sports Hall, Cairo
Attendance: 100
Referees: Mame Medoune Ndiaye Dieye (SEN), Léa Ndererimana (RWA), Olive Mukandanga (RWA)

== Awards ==
=== MVP ===
Player	Team	Ref.
(Egypt) Raneem El-Gedawy	(Egypt) Al Ahly	

=== All-star team ===
Player	Team	Ref.
(Egypt) Raneem El-Gedawy	(Egypt) Al Ahly	
(United States) Aliyah Matharu	(Senegal) ASC Ville de Dakar	
(Senegal) Yacine Diop	(Rwanda) APR	
(Mozambique) Ingvild Mucauro	(Mozambique) Ferroviário de Maputo	
(Egypt) Hagar Amer	(Egypt) Al Ahly	

=== Best rebounder ===
Player	Team	Ref.
(Egypt) Hagar Amer	(Egypt) Al Ahly	

=== Best three-point shooter ===
Player	Team	Ref.
(United States) Kayana Traylor	(Rwanda) REG	

=== Best scorer ===
Player	Team	Ref.
(United States) Kayana Traylor	(Rwanda) REG	

== Final standing ==
Rank	Team
1st place, gold medalist(s)	(Egypt) Al Ahly
2nd place, silver medalist(s)	(Mozambique) Ferroviário de Maputo
3rd place, bronze medalist(s)	(Rwanda) APR
4	(Senegal) ASC Ville de Dakar
5	(Angola) Sporting Clube de Luanda
6	(Kenya) KPA
7	(Rwanda) REG
8	(Democratic Republic of the Congo) CNSS
9	(Cameroon) FAP
10	(Nigeria) First Bank
11	(Ivory Coast) Friend’s Basketball Association
12	(Malawi) Bravehearts

2025 Women's Basketball League Africa

Al Ahly
First title

Team roster: Delicia Washington, Meral Abdelgawad, Nadine Mohamed, Soraya Degheidy, Dina Elsharbasy, Nyamer Lual Diew, Radwa Mohamed Oweis, Raneem El-Gedawy, Asia Rhennia, Hagar Amer, Yara Hussein, Rose Macuei, Farida Abdelnabi, Joudy Elgohary, Jayda Elmasry, Hana Hathout.
Head Coach: Tarek Abouzied
