= 2006 African Fencing Championships =

The 2006 African Fencing Championships were held in Casablanca, Morocco from 20 to 23 June.

== Medal summary ==
=== Men's events ===
Event	Gold	Silver	Bronze
Foil	Tamer Mohamed Tahoun (EGY)	Mostafa Nagaty (EGY)	Magdy Tarek (EGY); Mahmoud Mansour (EGY)
Épée	Muhannad Saif El-Din (EGY)	Ahmed El Kafrawy (EGY)	Ahmed El-Saghir (EGY); Ahmed Nabil (EGY)
Sabre	Mohamed Rabei (TUN)	Souhaib Sakrani (TUN)	Medhat El-Bakry (EGY); Mahmoud Samir (EGY)
Team Foil	Egypt	Morocco	Senegal
Team Épée	Egypt	Morocco	Senegal
Team Sabre	Tunisia	Egypt	Senegal

=== Women's events ===
Event	Gold	Silver	Bronze
Foil	Shaimaa El-Gammal (EGY)	Eman El Gammal (EGY)	Inès Boubakri (TUN); Eman Shaaban (EGY)
Épée	Mona Abdel Aziz (EGY)	Rachel Barlow (RSA)	Khadija Chbani (MAR); Aminata Ndong (SEN)
Sabre	Azza Besbes (TUN)	Fathalli Chaima (TUN)	Hela Besbes (TUN); Anna Ngoulou Seck (SEN)
Team Foil	Egypt	Morocco	Senegal
Team Épée	Egypt	Morocco	Senegal
Team Sabre	Tunisia	Senegal	Morocco

=== Medal table ===
Rank	Nation	Gold	Silver	Bronze	Total
1	Egypt	8	4	7	19
2	Tunisia	4	2	2	8
3	Morocco	0	4	2	6
4	Senegal	0	1	7	8
5	South Africa	0	1	0	1
Totals (5 entries)		12	12	18	42
