= Rwanda Women's Basketball League =

- Organising body: FERWABA
- Country: Rwanda
- Confederation: FIBA Africa
- Number of teams: 12
- Level on pyramid: 1
- International cup: FIBA Africa Women's Basketball League
- Current champions: REG (2nd title) (2024)
- Most championships: APR (4 titles)

The Rwanda Women's Basketball League is the top level women's basketball in Rwanda. It is organised by the FERWABA, the national basketball federation.

The most decorated team in league history is APR WBBC.

== Teams ==
The teams that make up the RWBL for the 2024 season are:

Team
REG
APR
GSMRR
Kepler
RP-IPRC Huye
Gahini
The Hoops
EA Univ
UR Kigali
UR BBC

== Champions ==
- 2013: APR
- 2016: Ubunwe
- 2017: APR
- 2019: APR
- 2020: The Hoops
- 2021: Ubunwe
- 2022: REG
- 2023: APR

=== Finals ===
Season	Champions	Runners-up	Finals score	Ref.
2012–13	APR	Ubunwe	2–1	
2013–2015	No league organised			
2015–16	Ubunwe	APR	3–0	
2016–17	APR	IPRC South	3–1	
2018–19	APR	The Hoops	4–2	
2019–20	The Hoops	IPRC Huye	68–63	
2020–21	Ubunwe	The Hoops	2–1	
2022	REG	APR	3–1	
2023	APR	REG	4–1	
2024	REG	APR	3–1	

=== Performance by club ===
Club	Winners	Runners-up	Years won	Years runner-up
APR	4	2	2013, 2017, 2019, 2023	2016, 2022
Ubunwe	2	1	2016, 2021	2013
REG	2	1	2022, 2024	2023
The Hoops	1	2	2020	2019, 2021
IPRC South	—	1	—	2017
IPRC Huye	—	1	—	2020

== Individual awards ==
=== Playoffs MVP ===
- 2024 – Kristina Morgan, REG
