= Kayana Traylor =

American basketball player (born 1999)

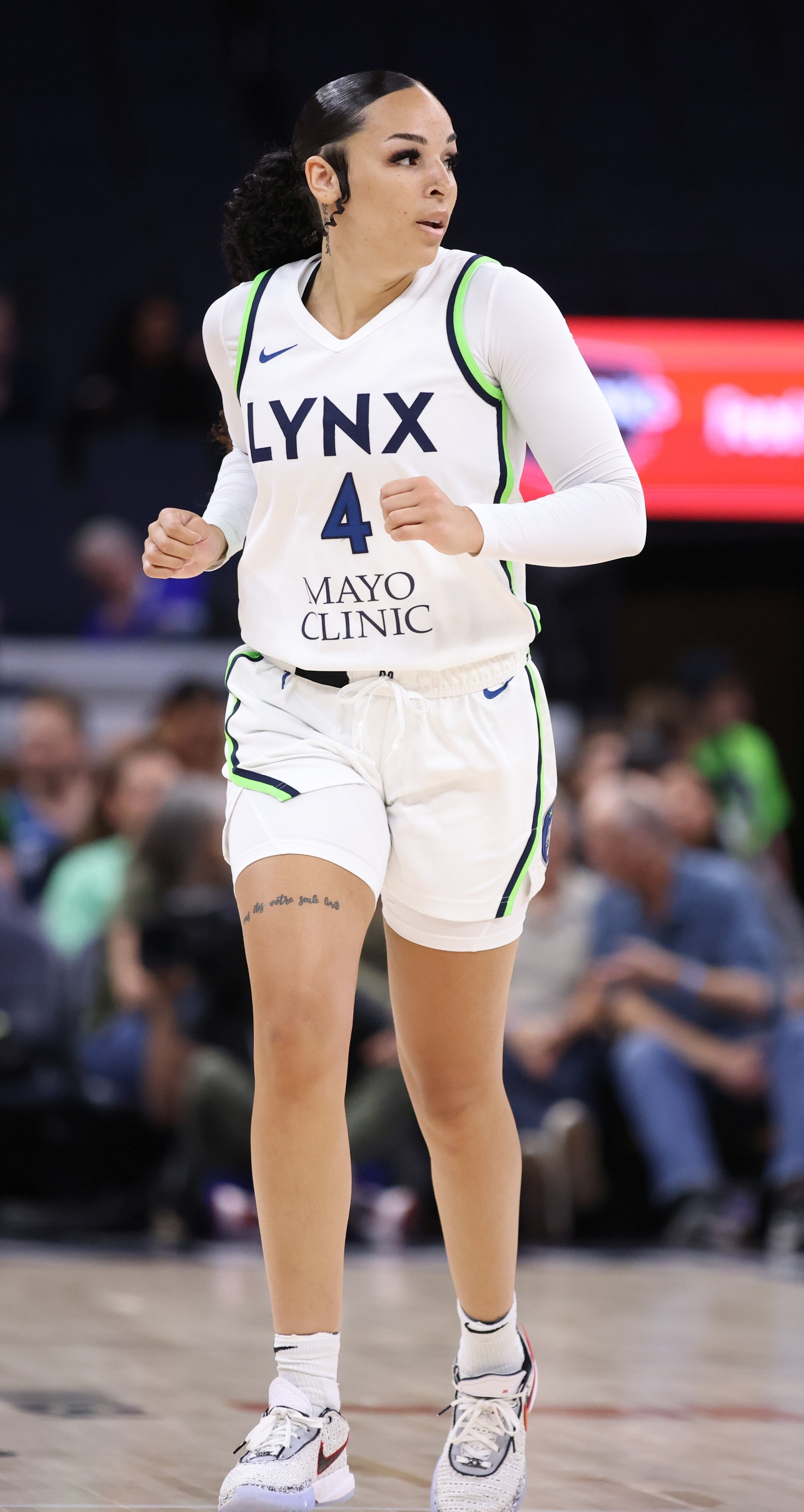
- Traylor with the Minnesota Lynx in 2023

Personal information
- Born: September 27, 1999 (age 27) Martinsville, Indiana, U.S.
- Listed height: 5 ft 9 in (1.75 m)

Career information
- High school: Martinsville (Martinsville, Indiana)
- College: Purdue (2018–2021); Virginia Tech (2021–2023)
- WNBA draft: 2023: 2nd round, 23rd overall pick
- Drafted by: Chicago Sky
- Playing career: 2023–present
- Position: Guard

Career history
- 2023: Minnesota Lynx
- 2023–2024: Charnay Basket Bourgogne Sud
- 2024: Bodrum Basketbol
- 2025: Maccabi Ramat Gan

Career highlights
- All-Big Ten Honorable Mention - Media (2021); All-Big Ten Second Team - Coaches (2021)
- Stats at Basketball Reference

Kayana Traylor (born September 27, 1999) is an American professional basketball player. She was drafted by the Chicago Sky in the 2023 WNBA draft. She played college basketball at Purdue and Virginia Tech.

== College career ==
Traylor came out of the high school as the 41st overall rated recruit by ESPNW's Top 100 per HoopGurlz. In September 2015, Traylor committed to the play for the Purdue Boilermakers and became the first player committed in the 2018 recruiting class.

During her freshman season, Traylor became a starter for the Boilermakers and was one of the best assisters in program history. She became the sixth-most assists by a freshman and also has the fifth-best assist per game average as a freshman. Her junior year with the Boilermakers was her best one statistically. She averaged 14.6 points and 3.9 assists during Big Ten play, which allowed her to be rewarded by the coaches with an All-Big Ten Second Team honor and an Honorable Mention by the media.

Following her junior season, Traylor announced that she would be transferring and play her final two years somewhere else. In April 2021, Traylor announced that she would transfer to Virginia Tech.

Traylor averaged double-digit in both years with the Hokies. She scored her 1,000th career point against Clemson in February 2022. During her fifth year of college basketball, Traylor helped guide Virginia Tech to the first ever Final Four in their program's history.

== College statistics ==
Year	Team	GP	Points	FG%	3P%	FT%	RPG	APG	SPG	BPG	PPG
2018–19	Purdue	22	217	.382	.283	.711	1.9	3.6	1.0	0.2	6.6
2019–20	Purdue	32	210	.396	.333	.734	2.1	3.2	0.6	0.1	6.6
2020–21	Purdue	23	344	.387	.286	.800	2.8	3.9	1.2	0.2	15.0
2021–22	Virginia Tech	33	344	.438	.330	.816	2.4	1.8	0.6	0.0	10.4
2022–23	Virginia Tech	35	344	.438	.330	.816	3.4	2.9	1.0	0.2	11.0
Career		156	1499	.410	.314	.778	2.5	3.0	0.9	0.1	9.6

== Professional career ==
=== WNBA ===
==== Minnesota Lynx (2023) ====
Traylor was selected 23rd overall in the Second Round of the 2023 WNBA draft by the Chicago Sky. Following training camp with the Sky, Traylor was waived and did not make the Sky's roster. On June 26, 2023, Traylor signed a Hardship Contract with the Minnesota Lynx. She made her WNBA debut the next day on June 27, 2023, when the Lynx faced off with the Seattle Storm. She played a minute of action and did not record any other statistics. After spending a month on a hardship contract, Traylor was released on July 20, 2023, after Aerial Powers was activated and returned from injury.

Traylor joined the Lynx's training camp for the 2024 season and played in two preseason games, but she did not make the final roster.

Traylor signed a training camp contract with the Indiana Fever on April 13, 2026. She was waived on May 6, 2026, before the start of the 2026 regular season.

=== Overseas ===
Traylor played for Charnay Basket Bourgogne Sud of the Ligue Féminine de Basketball during the 2023–2024 season.

Traylor played for Bodrum Basketbol of the Women's Basketball Super League from October to December 2024.

She played for Maccabi Ramat Gan of the Israeli Female Basketball Premier League during the 2024–2025 season.

=== WNBA career statistics ===
Legend
GP	Games played	GS	Games started	MPG	Minutes per game	RPG	Rebounds per game
APG	Assists per game	SPG	Steals per game	BPG	Blocks per game	PPG	Points per game
TO	Turnovers per game	FG%	Field-goal percentage	3P%	3-point field-goal percentage	FT%	Free-throw percentage
**Bold**	Career best	°	League leader

==== Regular season ====
Year	Team	GP	GS	MPG	FG%	3P%	FT%	RPG	APG	SPG	BPG	TO	PPG
2023	Minnesota	8	0	4.4	.300	.000	1.000	0.1	0.4	0.3	0.0	0.4	1.0
Career	1 year, 1 team	8	0	4.4	.300	.000	1.000	0.1	0.4	0.3	0.0	0.4	1.0
