= Alima Doumbia =

Ivoirian Female basketballer

Alima Doumbia (born August 31, 2002, in Ivory Coast) is an Ivorian basketball player representing the national women's basketball team. She played for SOA team in 2021/2022 season. Alima Doumbia participated in the African Championships which was held in 2023 with Ivory Coast.

== Career statistics (national) ==
Alima's performance is summarized for the Senior National Team, focusing on her participation in the 2023 FIBA Women's AfroBasket. In this event, she played two games, averaging 2.5 points per game (PPG), 1 rebound per game (RPG), 0 assists per game (APG), and earning an efficiency (EFF) rating of -3.5. Her total average across this event stands at 2.5 points, 1 rebound, 0 assists, and an EFF rating of -3.5.
