= APR WBBC =

Armée Patriotique Rwandaise Women's Basketball Club is a Rwandan professional women's basketball team based in Kigali. The Lions have won the Rwanda Women's Basketball League in 2013, 2017, 2019, and 2023, among years. They also played in the FIBA Africa Women's Basketball League in its inaugural season in 2024.

== Honours ==
Rwanda Women's Basketball League

- Champions (4): 2013, 2017, 2019, 2023
