= Aminata Ndong =

Senegalese fencer

Personal information
- Nationality: Senegalese
- Born: 3 May 1980 (age 46)
- Height: 167 cm (5 ft 6 in)
- Weight: 51 kg (112 lb)

Sport
- Sport: Fencing
- Event: Epee

Aminata Ndong (born 3 May 1980) is a right-handed Senegalese former fencer. She competed in the women's individual épée event at the 2004 Summer Olympics.
