= 2008 FIBA Africa Under-18 Championship for Women squads =

2008 FIBA Africa U-18 Championship for Women squads

This article displays the rosters for the participating teams at the 2008 FIBA Africa Under-18 Championship for Women.

== Angola ==
Angola women's national U18 basketball team – 2008 FIBA Africa Championship – 10th place roster
Players
Coaches

Pos.	No.	Name	Age – Date of birth	Height	Club	Ctr.
	4	Fineza Eusébio	18 – 18 July 1990		Primeiro de Agosto	(Angola)
	5	Marília Pascoal	17 – 17 June 1991
	6	Rosária Queta	16 – 2 July 1992
	7	Elisabete Pascoal	18 – 9 January 1990
	8	Conceição Estevão	18 – 3 March 1990
	9	Merciana Fernandes	16 – 2 April 1992
	10	Ana Gonçalves	15 – 3 January 1993		Interclube Benguela	(Angola)
	11	Javete Lusilanovo	17 – 12 March 1991
	12	Flora Bernardo	17 – 25 December 1990
	13	Cristina Matiquite	16 – 12 March 1992
	14	Cláudia Dundão	18 – 18 April 1990
	15	Mireille Matondo	15 – 28 December 1992

Head coach

- (Angola) Apolinário Paquete

Assistant coach

Legend

- (C) Team captain
- nat field describes country

== Benin ==
Benin women's national U18 basketball team – 2008 FIBA Africa Championship – 8th place roster
Players
Coaches

Pos.	No.	Name	Age – Date of birth	Height	Club	Ctr.
	4	Julienne Toko	16 – 16 February 1992
	5	Aïshatou Kondoh	14 – 8 April 1994
	6	Abibatou Salou	15 – 14 December 1992
	7	Rafiath Salaou	18 – 11 August 1990
	8	Raïmath Salaou	18 – 11 August 1990
	9	Patricia Adjai	16 – 21 June 1992
	10	Christelle Houessou	18 – 12 April 1990
	11	Boucharath Lawani	17 – 29 May 1991
	12	Folakè Salami	16 – 13 April 1992
	13	Akouavi Souhoude	17 – 19 December 1990
	14	Ernestine Kouke	14 – 9 December 1993
	15	Carine Dagon	15 – 14 October 1992

Head coach

Assistant coach

Legend

- (C) Team captain
- Club field describes current club

== (Democratic Republic of the Congo) DR Congo ==
DR Congo women's national U18 basketball team – 2008 FIBA Africa Championship – 9th place roster
Players
Coaches

Pos.	No.	Name	Age – Date of birth	Height	Club	Ctr.
	4	Nadege Nzuzi	15 – 7 July 1993
	5	Nathalie Elonga	15 – 30 March 1993
	6	Vanessa Apomolia	12 – 1 February 1996
	7	Natacha Mambengya	16 – 28 May 1992		ASB Hatari
	8	Idrissa Wanani	15 – 2 June 1993
	9	Elysée Ilunga	18 – 30 August 1990
	10	Thérèse Bakenga	18 – 15 May 1990
	11	Carine Abongo	16 – 15 June 1992
	12	Olga Mpiana	16 – 23 September 1992
	13	Tania Membre	16 – 23 May 1992
	14	Sandra Kalombo	15 – 1 July 1993
	15	Mireille Nyota	18 – 2 February 1990

Head coach

Assistant coach

Legend

- (C) Team captain
- Club field describes current club

== Guinea ==
Guinea women's national U18 basketball team – 2008 FIBA Africa Championship – 6th place roster
Players
Coaches

Pos.	No.	Name	Age – Date of birth	Height	Club	Ctr.
	4	Alimatou Koulibaly	14 – 29 July 1994
	5	Kadiatou Yattara	14 – 1 December 1993
	6	Marie Diallo	15 – 21 September 1993
	7	Moussogbe Sidibe	16 – 1 January 1992
	8	Kadiatou Camara	16 – 7 August 1992
	9	Hadja Diallo	13 – 8 November 1994
	10	Mariama Touré	14 – 1 January 1994
	11	Djélima Condé	14 – 19 October 1993
	12	Aissatou Bangoura	15 – 14 April 1993
	13	Mariame Bah	16 – 10 January 1992
	14	Fanta Sidimé	15 – 1 January 1993
	15	Maladho Bah	16 – 20 July 1992

Head coach

Assistant coach

Legend

- (C) Team captain
- Club field describes current club

== Ivory Coast ==
Ivory Coast women's national U18 basketball team – 2008 FIBA Africa Championship – 5th place roster
Players
Coaches

Pos.	No.	Name	Age – Date of birth	Height	Club	Ctr.
	4	Céline Zamaty	15 – 22 December 1992
	5	Maïmounatou Kolga	16 – 7 April 1992
	6	Habibou Garikoe	14 – 25 December 1993
	7	Barakissa Konate	15 – 17 December 1992
	8	Ahissa Kassi	17 – 2 December 1990
	9	Aicha Kere	16 – 14 December 1991
	10	Saran Camara	16 – 20 December 1991
	11	Kokou Kouadio	18 – 8 March 1990
	12	Nadege Zouzou	15 – 17 December 1992
	13	Kani Kouyate	18 – 8 August 1990
	14	Korotoum Diawara	15 – 16 December 1992
	15	Mamiky Cisse	16 – 16 December 1991

Head coach

Assistant coach

Legend

- (C) Team captain
- Club field describes current club

== Kenya ==
Kenya women's national U18 basketball team – 2008 FIBA Africa Championship – 7th place roster
Players
Coaches

Pos.	No.	Name	Age – Date of birth	Height	Club	Ctr.
	4	Caroline Oketch	17 – 4 January 1991
	5	Helen Oketch	16 – 24 April 1992
	6	Diana Odonge	18 – 6 August 1990
	8	Beril Ochieng	17 – 6 August 1991
	9	Linet Obonyo	17 – 28 June 1991
	10	Everline Adhiambo	16 – 21 December 1991
	12	Mildred Olumasi	16 – 5 January 1992
	13	Joyce Misita	16 – 24 November 1991
	14	Mercy Erweo	16 – 14 December 1991
	15	Purity Auma	15 – 20 October 1992

Head coach

Assistant coach

Legend

- (C) Team captain
- Club field describes current club

== Mali ==
Mali women's national U18 basketball team – 2008 FIBA Africa Championship – Gold Medal roster
Players
Coaches

Pos.	No.	Name	Age – Date of birth	Height	Club	Ctr.
	4	Adama Sissoko	17 – 8 January 1991
	5	Sega Bah	17 – 14 December 1990
	6	Laoudy Maiga	17 – 15 October 1990	1.65 m (5 ft 5 in)
	7	Aissata Djibo	18 – 3 March 1990
	8	Nassira Traore	17 – 29 May 1991
	9	Aissata Traoré	18 – 4 January 1990
	10	Aminata Mariko	18 – 23 June 1990
	11	Ouleymatou Coulibaly	18 – 15 July 1990
	12	Fatoumata Traoré	18 – 10 June 1990
	13	Kankou Coulibaly	18 – 11 April 1990	1.85 m (6 ft 1 in)
	14	Djenebou Sacko	18 – 12 June 1990	1.80 m (5 ft 11 in)
	15	Astan Dabo	16 – 30 May 1992	2.03 m (6 ft 8 in)

Head coach

- (Ivory Coast) Souleymane Tembely

Assistant coach

Legend

- (C) Team captain
- Club field describes current club

== Mozambique ==
Mozambique women's national U18 basketball team – 2008 FIBA Africa Championship – Bronze Medal roster
Players
Coaches

Pos.	No.	Name	Age – Date of birth	Height	Club	Ctr.
	4	Rosita Chilengue	17 – 1 June 1991
	5	Ingvild Mucauro	16 – 12 September 1992	1.78 m (5 ft 10 in)
	6	Benezita Muchave	16 – 27 September 1992
	7	Ana Jaime	17 – 6 December 1990
	8	Delmira Invosso	18 – 27 May 1990
	9	Ornélia Mutombene	17 – 24 October 1990
	10	Sandra Muthemba	16 – 13 January 1992
	11	Leia Dongue	18 – 24 May 1990	1.84 m (6 ft 0 in)
	12	Regina Mahoche	18 – 6 June 1990
	13	Isabel Mazavile	18 – 13 August 1990
	14	Nilza Chiziane	16 – 27 February 1992
	15	Cecília Henriques	18 – 24 August 1990	1.83 m (6 ft 0 in)

Head coach

Assistant coach

Legend

- (C) Team captain
- Club field describes current club

== Nigeria ==
Nigeria women's national U18 basketball team – 2008 FIBA Africa Championship – 4th place roster
Players
Coaches

Pos.	No.	Name	Age – Date of birth	Height	Club	Ctr.
	4	Wanhemba Pine	16 – 5 February 1992
F	5	Ujunwa Ugoka	15 – 24 May 1993
	6	Josephine Awuhe	16 – 29 December 1991
	7	Ojoma Ewaoche	15 – 27 October 1992
	8	Nkechi Akashili	18 – 22 February 1990
	9	Theresa Samuel	16 – 9 July 1992
	10	Tobiloba Abiodun	16 – 10 May 1992
	11	Doris Ikenna	17 – 29 September 1991
	12	Preye Daboh	14 – 20 December 1993
	13	Mbawuese Gede	15 – 20 April 1993
	14	Mary Ojeata	16 – 25 November 1991
C	15	Temitope Oladele	15 – 25 October 1992

Head coach

- (Nigeria) Andrew Isokpehi

Assistant coach

Legend

- (C) Team captain
- Club field describes current club

== Tunisia ==
Tunisia women's national U18 basketball team – 2008 FIBA Africa Championship - Silver Medal roster
Players
Coaches

Pos.	No.	Name	Age – Date of birth	Height	Club	Ctr.
	4	Khouloud Mefteh	17 – 5 January 1991
	5	Narjes Jaballah	18 – 27 February 1990
	6	Imen Jrad	18 – 14 June 1990
	7	Monia Mechlia	16 – 19 March 1992
	8	Lilia Inoubli	16 – 15 February 1992
	9	Hiba Kachouri	17 – 11 February 1991
	10	Abir Aidi	17 – 24 June 1991
	11	Ichrak Bouteraa	17 – 12 March 1991
	12	Amal Abdessamie	18 – 1 May 1990
	13	Zbeyda Arami	17 – 6 April 1991
	14	Souhir Friji	17 – 2 December 1990
	15	Dhouha Abdelghani	17 – 17 October 1990

Head coach

Assistant coach

Legend

- (C) Team captain
- Club field describes current club

== Uganda ==
Uganda women's national U18 basketball team – 2008 FIBA Africa Championship - 11th place roster
Players
Coaches

Pos.	No.	Name	Age – Date of birth	Height	Club	Ctr.
	5	Angela Namirimu	18 – 22 January 1990
	7	Yvonne Byanjeru	17 – 19 February 1991
	8	Charlene Karungi	18 – 26 August 1990
	9	Dorothy Kyamazima	17 – 2 October 1991
	12	Halima Nabasumba	16 – 17 December 1991
	13	Mariam Tamale	17 – 26 July 1991
	14	Chantal Aching	15 – 30 November 1992

Head coach

Assistant coach

Legend

- (C) Team captain
- Club field describes current club

== See also ==
- 2009 FIBA Africa Championship for Women squads
