= FIBA U18 Women's AfroBasket =

Under-18 continental basketball championship

- Most recent season or competition: 2026 FIBA U18 Women's AfroBasket
- Formerly: FIBA U18 Women's African Championship; FIBA Africa Under-18 Championship for Women
- Sport: Basketball
- Founded: 1985; 41 years ago
- Organizing body: FIBA Africa
- No. of teams: 12
- Continent: Africa
- Most recent champion: Mali (10th title)
- Most titles: Mali (10 titles)
- Qualification: FIBA U19 Women's World Cup
- Related competitions: FIBA U16 Women's AfroBasket
- Website: fiba.basketball/history

The FIBA U18 Women's AfroBasket, previously known as the FIBA U18 Women's African Championship or the FIBA Africa Under-18 Championship for Women, is a biennial international youth basketball competition organized by FIBA Africa, where under-18 women's national teams participate.

The tournament also serves as a qualification for the FIBA Under-19 Women's Basketball World Cup, where the top two teams qualify.

== Summary ==
| Year | Hosts | Final | | | Third place match | | |
| Year | Hosts | Champions | Score | Runners-up | Third place | Score | Fourth place |
|---|---|---|---|---|---|---|---|
| 1985; Details | (Ghana); Accra | Senegal | ? | Mozambique | Angola | — | — |
| 1988; Details | (Angola); Luanda | Zaire | ? | Angola | — | — | — |
| 1991; Details | (Senegal); Dakar | Zaire | ? | Senegal | Angola | — | — |
| 1996; Details | (Mozambique); Maputo | Mali | 80–69 | Mozambique | ~~Zaire~~ ^{WD} | — | — |
| 1999; Details | (Senegal); Dakar | Angola | round-robin | Senegal | Egypt | round-robin | Mali |
| 2000; Details | (Mali); Bamako | Mali | ? | Ivory Coast | Angola | — | — |
| 2004; Details | (Tunisia); Ben Arous | Tunisia | 84–78 | DR Congo | Mozambique | 62–37 | Angola |
| 2006; Details | (Benin); Cotonou | Mali | 77–66 | Ivory Coast | DR Congo | 85–44 | Benin |
| 2008; Details | (Tunisia); Radès | Mali | 57–35 | Tunisia | Mozambique | 69–63 | Nigeria |
| 2010; Details | (Egypt); Cairo | Egypt | 63–62 | Nigeria | Mozambique | 61–48 | Mali |
| 2012; Details | (Senegal); Dakar | ~~Senegal~~ ^{2012 title} | ~~55–50~~ | Mali | Egypt | 45–44 | Tunisia |
| 2014; Details | (Egypt); Cairo | Mali | 70–60 | Egypt | Mozambique | 51–48 | Algeria |
| 2016; Details | (Egypt); Cairo | Mali | 84–61 | Egypt | Mozambique | 56–43 | Angola |
| 2018; Details | (Mozambique); Maputo | Mali | 86–33 | Mozambique | Angola | 59–46 | Rwanda |
| 2020; Details | (Egypt); Cairo | Egypt | 68–63 | Mali | Senegal | – | – |
| 2022; Details | (Madagascar); Antsirabe | Mali | 86–54 | Egypt | Angola | 53–37 | Madagascar |
| 2024; Details | (South Africa); Pretoria | Mali | 76–56 | Nigeria | Cameroon | 70–66 | Uganda |
| 2026; Details | (Ivory Coast); Abidjan | Mali | 77–68 | Nigeria | Egypt | 60–52 | Ivory Coast |
| 2028; Details | (N/A); TBD | | – | | | – | |

^WD Zaire withdrew from the 1996 tournament.
^2012 title The Senegalese Basketball Federation relinquished the 2012 title due to age fraud by some of its players.

== Medal table ==
| Rank | Nation | Gold | Silver | Bronze | Total |
|---|---|---|---|---|---|
| 1 | Mali | 10 | 2 | 0 | 12 |
| 2 | Egypt | 2 | 3 | 3 | 8 |
| 3 | Senegal | 2 | 2 | 1 | 5 |
| 4 | DR Congo | 2 | 1 | 1 | 4 |
| 5 | Angola | 1 | 1 | 5 | 7 |
| 6 | Tunisia | 1 | 1 | 0 | 2 |
| 7 | Mozambique | 0 | 3 | 5 | 8 |
| 8 | Nigeria | 0 | 3 | 0 | 3 |
| 9 | Ivory Coast | 0 | 2 | 0 | 2 |
| 10 | Cameroon | 0 | 0 | 1 | 1 |
| Totals (10 entries) | | 18 | 18 | 16 | 52 |

== Participation details ==
| Team | (Ghana) 1985 | (Angola) 1988 | (Senegal) 1991 | (Mozambique) 1996 | (Senegal) 1999 | (Mali) 2000 | (Tunisia) 2004 | (Benin) 2006 | (Tunisia) 2008 | (Egypt) 2010 | (Senegal) 2012 | (Egypt) 2014 | (Egypt) 2016 | (Mozambique) 2018 | (Egypt) 2020 | (Madagascar) 2022 | (South Africa) 2024 | (Ivory Coast) 2026 | (N/A) 2028 | Total |
|---|---|---|---|---|---|---|---|---|---|---|---|---|---|---|---|---|---|---|---|---|
| Algeria | | | | | | | | | | | | 4th | 7th | | | 6th | | | | 3 |
| Angola | 3rd | 2nd | 3rd | | 1st | 3rd | 4th | 5th | 10th | 7th | 5th | 5th | 4th | 3rd | | 3rd | 6th | | | 15 |
| Benin | | | | | | | | 4th | 8th | | | | | | | | | 11th | | 3 |
| Botswana | | | | | | | | | | | | 8th | | | | | | | | 1 |
| Cameroon | | | | | | | | | | | | | | | | | 3rd | 5th | | 2 |
| Cape Verde | | | | | | | | | | | | | | 6th | | | | | | 1 |
| Central African Republic | | | | | | | 7th | | | | | | | | | | | 12th | | 2 |
| DR Congo (incl. Zaire) | | 1st | 1st | | | | 2nd | 3rd | 9th | 9th | | | | 7th | | | | | | 7 |
| Egypt | | | | | 3rd | | | | | 1st | 3rd | 2nd | 2nd | 5th | 1st | 2nd | 5th | 3rd | Q | 11 |
| Guinea | | | | | | | | | 6th | | | | | | | 8th | | | | 2 |
| Ivory Coast | | | | | | 2nd | | 2nd | 5th | 6th | | 7th | | | | | | 4th | Q | 7 |
| Kenya | | | | | | | | | 7th | 10th | 6th | | | | | | | 8th | | 4 |
| Madagascar | | | | | | | | | | | | | 5th | | | 4th | | | | 2 |
| Mali | | | | 1st | 4th | 1st | 6th | 1st | 1st | 4th | 2nd | 1st | 1st | 1st | 2nd | 1st | 1st | 1st | Q | 16 |
| Morocco | | | | | | | | | | | | | | | | | 9th | 10th | | 2 |
| Mozambique | 2nd | | | 2nd | | | 3rd | | 3rd | 3rd | | 3rd | 3rd | 2nd | | | | | | 8 |
| Nigeria | | | | | | | | | 4th | 2nd | | | | | | | 2nd | 2nd | Q | 5 |
| Rwanda | | | | | | | | | | | | | | 4th | | | 7th | | | 2 |
| Senegal | 1st | | 2nd | | 2nd | | | | | 8th | 1st | | | | 3rd | | | 9th | | 7 |
| South Africa | | | | | | | 5th | | | | | | | | | | 10th | | | 2 |
| Tanzania | | | | | | | | | | | | | | | | 7th | | | | 1 |
| Tunisia | | | | | | | 1st | | 2nd | 5th | 4th | 6th | 6th | | | | 8th | 7th | | 8 |
| Uganda | | | | | | | | | 11th | | | | 8th | 8th | | 5th | 4th | 6th | | 6 |
| Zambia | | | | | | | | | | | | | | | | | 11th | | | 1 |
| Zimbabwe | | | | | | | | | | | | | | | | | 12th | | | 1 |
| Total | 3 | 2 | 3 | 2 | 4 | 3 | 7 | 5 | 11 | 10 | 6 | 8 | 8 | 8 | 3 | 8 | 12 | 12 | # | |

== MVP Awards ==
| Year | MVP Award Winner |
|---|---|
| 1998 | (Angola) Teresa Gonçalves |
| 2006 | (Mali) Fanta Toure |
| 2008 | (Mali) Laoudy Maiga |
| 2010 | (Egypt) Reem Osama |
| 2012 | (Senegal) Yacine Diop |
| 2014 | (Mali) Djeneba N'Diaye |
| 2016 | (Egypt) Meral Abdelgawad |
| 2018 | (Mali) Assetou Sissoko |
| 2020 | (Egypt) Yara Hussein |
| 2022 | (Mali) Maimouna Haidara |
| 2024 | (Mali) Oummou Koumare |
| 2026 | (Mali) Maimouna Traoré |

== U19 Women's World Cup record ==
| Team | (United States) 1985 | (Spain) 1989 | (South Korea) 1993 | (Brazil) 1997 | (Czech Republic) 2001 | (Tunisia) 2005 | (Slovakia) 2007 | (Thailand) 2009 | (Chile) 2011 | (Lithuania) 2013 | (Russia) 2015 | (Italy) 2017 | (Thailand) 2019 | (Hungary) 2021 | (Spain) 2023 | (Czech Republic) 2025 | (China) 2027 | Total |
|---|---|---|---|---|---|---|---|---|---|---|---|---|---|---|---|---|---|---|
| Mali | | | | 10th | 12th | | 15th | 14th | | 15th | 12th | 13th | 7th | 4th | 5th | DNP* | Q | 11 |
| Egypt | | | | | | | | | 15th | | 16th | 16th | | 12th | 12th | | | 5 |
| DR Congo | | 12th | 10th | | | 11th | | | | | | | | | | | | 3 |
| Senegal | 10th | | | | | | | | | 16th | | | | | | | | 2 |
| Tunisia | | | | | | 12th | | 15th | | | | | | | | | | 2 |
| Ivory Coast | | | | | | | 16th | | | | | | | | | | | 1 |
| Mozambique | | | | | | | | | | | | | 15th | | | | | 1 |
| Nigeria | | | | | | | | | 16th | | | | | | | 12th | Q | 3 |
| Total | 1 | 1 | 1 | 1 | 1 | 2 | 2 | 2 | 2 | 2 | 2 | 2 | 2 | 2 | 2 | 2 | 2 | |

* Mali were unable to travel to the tournament.

== Top Ten FIBA Africa girls' teams ==
Updated as of 13 December 2025.

| Rank | Change | Team | Points |
|---|---|---|---|
| 16 | ▼4 | Mali ^{C} | 583.9 |
| 21 | ▲4 | Egypt | 516.9 |
| 26 | ▲9 | Nigeria | 469.5 |
| 36 | ▲2 | Cameroon | 410.5 |
| 37 | ▼4 | Angola | 395.9 |
| 38 | Same position | Ivory Coast | 395.7 |
| 40 | ▼6 | Uganda | 330.3 |
| 42 | ▼5 | Tunisia | 310.2 |
| 43 | ▼3 | Morocco | 307.7 |
| 46 | ▲7 | Tanzania | 272 |

^{C} Current U18 Africa champions

== See also ==
- FIBA Women's AfroBasket
- FIBA U16 Women's AfroBasket
- FIBA U20 Women's AfroBasket
