= Egypt women's national under-19 basketball team =

Egypt
- FIBA zone: FIBA Africa
- National federation: Egyptian Basketball Federation

U19 World Cup
- Appearances: 5
- Medals: None

U18 AfroBasket
- Appearances: 9
- Medals: (gold) Gold: 2 (2010, 2020); (silver) Silver: 3 (2014, 2016, 2022); (bronze) Bronze: 2 (1998, 2012)
Home	Away

The Egypt women's national under-18 and under-19 basketball team is a national basketball team of Egypt, administered by the Egyptian Basketball Federation. It represents the country in international under-18 and under-19 women's basketball competitions.

== U18 Women's AfroBasket record ==
Year	Pos.	Pld	W	L
(Ghana) 1985	Did not participate			
(Angola) 1988	Did not participate			
(Senegal) 1991	Did not participate			
(Mozambique) 1996	Did not participate			
(Senegal) 1999	3rd	6	1	5
(Mali) 2000	Did not participate			
(Tunisia) 2004	Did not participate			
(Benin) 2006	Did not participate			
(Tunisia) 2008	Did not participate			
(Egypt) 2010	1st	7	7	0
(Senegal) 2012	3rd	7	5	2
(Egypt) 2014	2nd	7	5	2
(Egypt) 2016	2nd	6	5	1
(Mozambique) 2018	5th	6	3	3
(Egypt) 2020	1st	5	2	3
(Madagascar) 2022	2nd	6	5	1
(South Africa) 2024	5th	6	5	1
(Ivory Coast) 2026	3rd	6	4	2
Total	10/18	62	42	20

=== U19 Women's World Cup record ===
Year	Pos.	Pld	W	L
(United States) 1985	Did not qualify			
(Spain) 1989	Did not qualify			
(South Korea) 1993	Did not qualify			
(Brazil) 1997	Did not qualify			
(Czech Republic) 2001	Did not qualify			
(Tunisia) 2005	Did not qualify			
(Slovakia) 2007	Did not qualify			
(Thailand) 2009	Did not qualify			
(Chile) 2011	15th	5	1	4
(Lithuania) 2013	Did not qualify			
(Russia) 2015	16th	7	0	7
(Italy) 2017	16th	7	1	6
(Thailand) 2019	Did not qualify			
(Hungary) 2021	12th	7	1	6
(Spain) 2023	12th	7	2	5
(Czech Republic) 2025	Did not qualify			
(China) 2027	Did not qualify			
Total	6/17	33	5	28

== See also ==
- Egypt women's national basketball team
- Egypt women's national under-17 basketball team
- Egypt men's national under-19 basketball team
