= 2012 FIBA Africa Under-18 Championship for Women =

2012 FIBA U18 Women's AfroBasket
11th FIBA Under-18 Women's African Basketball Championship

Tournament details
- Host country: Senegal
- Dates: September 20–29
- Teams: 6
- Venue: 1 (in 1 host city)

Final positions
- Champions: Senegal (2nd title)

Tournament statistics
- MVP: (Senegal) Yacine Diop
- Top scorer: (Tunisia) Hamrouni
- Top rebounds: (Tunisia) Hamrouni
- Top assists: (Angola) Luyana 3.5

Official website
- 2012 FIBA Africa Championship for Women U-18

The 2012 FIBA Africa Under-18 Championship for Women was the 11th FIBA Africa U18 Women's basketball championship, played under the auspices of the Fédération Internationale de Basketball, the world basketball sport governing body and qualified for the 2013 World Cup. The tournament was held from September 20–29 in Dakar, Senegal, contested by 6 national teams and won by Senegal.

The tournament qualified the winner and the runner-up for the 2013 FIBA Under-19 World Championship for Women.

== Participating teams ==
Angola
Egypt
Kenya
Mali
Senegal
Tunisia

== Preliminary round ==
	Team	W	L	PF	PA	PD	Pts
1	Senegal	5	0	316	233	+83	10
2	Egypt	4	1	336	261	+75	9
3	Mali	3	2	280	228	+52	8
4	Tunisia	2	3	266	269	–3	7
5	Angola	1	4	223	273	–50	5
6	Kenya	0	5	214	371	–157	5

20 September 2012

Boxscore

Senegal	54–47	Tunisia
Scoring by quarter: 12-12, 20-8, 15-14, 7-13
Pts: Ndao 15; Rebs: Faye 9 Asts: Dieng 3		Pts: Lobiri 14; Rebs: Hamrouni 9 Asts: Jeffel 2

Marius Ndiaye Stadium, Dakar
Referees: Clésio Ramos (ANG), Nadjet Zenagui (ALG)

20 September 2012

Boxscore

Egypt	53–43	Mali
Scoring by quarter: 12-15, 5-4, 14-9, 22-15
Pts: Temsahi 17; Rebs: Temsahi 7 Asts: Deghady 2		Pts: Guindo 12; Rebs: Toure 18; Asts: Guindo 5

Marius Ndiaye Stadium, Dakar
Referees: Samira Garaaoui (MAR), Artorio Belguith (TUN)

20 September 2012

Boxscore

Angola	57–45	Kenya
Scoring by quarter: 19-5, 12-7, 14-12, 12-21
Pts: R.Gala 21; Rebs: Marta 8 Asts: R.Gala 3		Pts: Khasoa 11; Rebs: Khasoa, Ndalo 10; Asts: Asura 3

Marius Ndiaye Stadium, Dakar
Referees: Heba El Hadidy (EGY), Oumou Sissoko (MLI)

22 September 2012

Boxscore

Tunisia	76–48	Kenya
Scoring by quarter: 19-16, 16-8, 21-11, 20-13
Pts: Hamrouni 31; Rebs: Hamrouni 9 Asts: Grira 4		Pts: Tatumbi 11; Rebs: Tatumbi 11; Asts: Juma 3

Marius Ndiaye Stadium, Dakar
Referees: Clésio Ramos (ANG), Nadjet Zenagui (ALG), Oumou Sissoko (MLI)

22 September 2012

Boxscore

Egypt	76–43	Angola
Scoring by quarter: 15-4, 21-9, 19-16, 21-14
Pts: Temsahi 23; Rebs: El Saharty 5 Asts: Deghady, Moussa 4		Pts: R.Gala 18; Rebs: Marta 4 Asts: Feliciana 2

Marius Ndiaye Stadium, Dakar
Referees: Lawrie Meboung (CMR), Diagne Ndeye (SEN), Arbia Belguith (TUN)

22 September 2012

Boxscore

Mali	52–54	Senegal
Scoring by quarter: 18-8, 22-12, 9-15, 3-19
Pts: three players 9 Rebs: A.Traore 9 Asts: H.Traore 4		Pts: Kamara, N.Diop 15; Rebs: Ndiaye 10; Asts: Kamara, Dieng 2

Marius Ndiaye Stadium, Dakar
Referees: Samira Garnaoui (MAR), Hibia El Hadidy (EGY), Ambrose Kisoi (KEN)

24 September 2012

Boxscore

Tunisia	53–67	Egypt
Scoring by quarter: 16-14, 13-11, 13-20, 11-22
Pts: Lobiri 12; Rebs: Hamrouni 7 Asts: Baccar, Jeffel 2		Pts: Deghady 20; Rebs: Enam 12; Asts: Enam 4

Marius Ndiaye Stadium, Dakar
Referees: Diagne Ndeye (SEN), Ambrose Kisoi (KEN), Oumou Sissoko (MLI)

24 September 2012

Boxscore

Mali	55–37	Angola
Scoring by quarter: 16-6, 19-6, 7-19, 13-6
Pts: A.Traore 20; Rebs: A.Traore 13; Asts: Guindo 10		Pts: R.Gala 21; Rebs: R.Gala 11; Asts: Luyana 2

Marius Ndiaye Stadium, Dakar
Referees: Laurie Mebong (CMR), Heba El Hadidy (EGY), Arbia Belguith (TUN)

24 September 2012

Boxscore

Senegal	84–32	Kenya
Scoring by quarter: 25-12, 27-2, 20-11, 12-7
Pts: Y.Diop 20; Rebs: Kebe 7 Asts: Kebe 6		Pts: Tatumbi 8 Rebs: Tatumbi 12; Asts: Asura 4

Marius Ndiaye Stadium, Dakar
Referees: Clésio Ramos (ANG), Nadjet Zenagui (ALG)

25 September 2012

Boxscore

Kenya	49–86	Egypt
Scoring by quarter: 19-22, 14-31, 10-23, 6-10
Pts: Chebet 19; Rebs: Tatumbi 11; Asts: Khasoa 4		Pts: El Menawi 23; Rebs: El Menawi, Temsahi 4 Asts: El Menawi 8

Marius Ndiaye Stadium, Dakar
Referees: Oumou Sissoko (MLI), Arbia Belguith (TUN)

25 September 2012

Boxscore

Mali	62–44	Tunisia
Scoring by quarter: 19-8, 13-7, 19-9, 11-20
Pts: A.Traore 15; Rebs: M.Camara 7 Asts: Guindo 5		Pts: Hamrouni 21; Rebs: Hamrouni 8 Asts: Lobiri, Jeffel 2

Marius Ndiaye Stadium, Dakar
Referees: Diagne Ndeye (SEN), Clésio Ramos (ANG), Ambrose Kisoi (KEN)

25 September 2012

Boxscore

Angola	38–41	Senegal
Scoring by quarter: 10-13, 12-10, 11-6, 5-12
Pts: Doneth 14; Rebs: Nicoleth 12; Asts: Luyana 1		Pts: Y.Diop 10; Rebs: Y.Diop, Kamara 6 Asts: Dieng 4

Marius Ndiaye Stadium, Dakar
Referees: Laure Mebong (CMR), Heba El Hadidy (EGY), Nadjeti Zenagui (ALG)

26 September 2012

Kenya	40–68	Mali
Scoring by quarter: 9-16, 12-23, 5-10, 14-19
Pts: n/a		Pts: n/a

Marius Ndiaye Stadium, Dakar

26 September 2012

Angola	38–46	Tunisia
Scoring by quarter: 5-11, 5-14, 15-11, 13-10
Pts: n/a		Pts: Hamrouni 16; Rebs: Hamrouni 11

Marius Ndiaye Stadium, Dakar

26 September 2012

Senegal	73–54	Egypt
Scoring by quarter: 16-12, 13-17, 23-8, 21-17
Pts: n/a		Pts: n/a

Marius Ndiaye Stadium, Dakar

== Knockout round ==
Championship bracket

Semi-finals
Friday 28 September
Senegal	42
Tunisia	35
Friday 28 September
Egypt	54
Mali	69

Final
Saturday 29 September
Tunisia	44
Egypt	45
3rd place
Saturday 29 September
Senegal	55
Mali	50

=== 5th place match ===
28 September 2012

Boxscore

Angola	80–46	Kenya
Scoring by quarter: 16-14, 17-9, 28-11, 19-12
Pts: Doneth 31; Rebs: M.Fula 10; Asts: R.Gala, H.Viegas 5		Pts: Chebet 11; Rebs: Ndalo, Juma 8 Asts: Asura 5

Marius Ndiaye Stadium, Dakar
Referees: Diagne Ndeye (SEN), Heba El Hadidy (EGY), Oumou Sissoko (MLI)

=== Semifinals ===
28 September 2012

Boxscore

Senegal	42–35	Tunisia
Scoring by quarter: 11-10, 10-8, 10-8, 11-9
Pts: Y.Diop 12; Rebs: Y.Diop 18; Asts: three players 2		Pts: Hamrouni 15; Rebs: Hamrouni 12; Asts: Grira, Lobiri 1

Marius Ndiaye Stadium, Dakar
Referees: Laurie Mebong (CMR), Ambrose Kisoi (KEN), Nadjet Zenagui (ALG)

28 September 2012

Boxscore

Egypt	54–69	Mali
Scoring by quarter: 20-16, 7-14, 12-23, 15-16
Pts: El Menawi 15; Rebs: Enam 7 Asts: Deghady 4		Pts: A.Traore 26; Rebs: Guindo 10; Asts: Guindo 4

Marius Ndiaye Stadium, Dakar
Referees: Samira Garnaoui (MAR), Clésio Ramos (ANG), Arbia Belguith (TUN)

=== Bronze medal game ===
29 September 2012

Boxscore

Tunisia	44–45 (OT)	Egypt
Scoring by quarter: 10-4, 4-12, 19-12, 5-10, Overtime: 6-7
Pts: Hamrouni 15; Rebs: Hamrouni 11; Asts: Mniguir 4		Pts: Deghady 11; Rebs: Emam 8 Asts: Moussa 3

Marius Ndiaye Stadium, Dakar

=== Gold medal game ===
29 September 2012

[ Boxscore]

Senegal	55–50	Mali
Scoring by quarter: 13-19, 15-10, 12-9, 15-12
Pts: Kamara 15		Pts: A.Traore 13

Marius Ndiaye Stadium, Dakar

== Final standings ==
Qualified for the 2013 FIBA U19 World Women's Championship

Rank	Team	Record
Gold medal	Senegal	7–0
Silver medal	Mali	4–3
Bronze medal	Egypt	5–2
4.	Tunisia	2–5
5.	Angola	2–4
6.	Kenya	0–6

Senegal roster
Aminata Faye, Aminata Kamara, Maissa Sylla, Mame Diallo, Mame Ndiaye, Mame Ndiaye, Mame Sy, Ndeye Dieng, Ndeye Diagne, Ndeye Kebe, Yacine Diop, Coach: Birahim Gaye

== Awards ==
2012 FIBA Africa Under-18 Championship for Women winner

Senegal
Second title

Most Valuable Player
(Senegal) Yacine Diop

=== All-Tournament Team ===
- (Senegal) Yacine Diop
- (Egypt) Soraia Deghady
- (Mali) Mariam Kone
- (Tunisia) Houda Hamrouni
- (Mali) Aminata Traore
