= 2026 FIBA U18 Women's AfroBasket =

18th FIBA Under-18 Women's African Basketball Championship

Tournament details
- Host country: Ivory Coast
- City: Abidjan
- Dates: 5−16 August
- Teams: 12 (from 1 confederation)
- Venues: 2 (in 1 host city)

Final positions
- Champions: Mali (10th title)
- Runners-up: Nigeria
- Third place: Egypt
- Fourth place: Ivory Coast

Tournament statistics
- MVP: (Mali) Maimouna Traoré

Official website
- www.fiba.basketball

The 2026 FIBA U18 Women's AfroBasket was the 18th edition of the African basketball championship for women's under-18 national teams. The tournament was played in Treichville (Abidjan), Ivory Coast, from 5 to 16 August 2026. This was the first time that Ivory Coast organized this event.

This tournament also served as the FIBA Africa's qualifier for the 2027 FIBA Under-19 Women's Basketball World Cup in China, where the top two teams qualified.

Mali secured their 10th overall title with a victory over Nigeria in the final, 77–68.

== Qualification ==
=== Qualified teams ===
Includes current world ranking prior to the start of the tournament (in parentheses).

- Host nation (1)
  - Ivory Coast (38)
- Zone I
  - Tunisia (42)
  - Morocco (43)
- Zone II
  - Mali (16)
  - Senegal (NR)
- Zone III
  - Nigeria (26)
  - Benin (NR)
- Zone IV
  - Cameroon (36)
  - Central African Republic (NR)
- Zone V
  - Egypt (21)
  - Uganda (40)
  - Kenya (49)

== Group phase ==
The draw of the group phase took place on 2 August 2026 in Ivory Coast.

In this round, the teams were drawn into three groups of four. The top two teams from each group and the best two third-placed teams advanced to the quarterfinals; the other teams were dropped to the 9th–12th place playoffs.

All times are local (Greenwich Mean Time; UTC+00:00).

=== Group A ===
Pos	Team	Pld	W	L	PF	PA	PD	Pts	Qualification
1	Ivory Coast (H)	3	3	0	248	85	+163	6	Quarterfinals
2	Uganda	3	2	1	214	180	+34	5	Quarterfinals
3	Kenya	3	1	2	159	186	−27	4	Quarterfinals
4	Central African Republic	3	0	3	92	262	−170	3	9th–12th place playoffs

Source: FIBA Africa
Rules for classification: 1) Points; 2) Head-to-head results; 3) Points difference; 4) Points scored.
(H) Hosts

6 August 2026
16:00

Boxscore

Ivory Coast	102–13	Central African Republic
Scoring by quarter: 26–2, 28–4, 26–7, 22–0

Salle Polyvalente, Treichville
Attendance: 300

6 August 2026
18:30

Boxscore

Uganda	84–57	Kenya
Scoring by quarter: 20–13, 20–18, 24–19, 20–7

Salle Polyvalente, Treichville

8 August 2026
11:00

Boxscore

Central African Republic	36–74	Kenya
Scoring by quarter: 8–19, 11–16, 8–24, 9–15

Salle Polyvalente, Treichville

8 August 2026
16:00

Boxscore

Ivory Coast	80–44	Uganda
Scoring by quarter: 25–12, 18–14, 20–10, 17–8

Salle Polyvalente, Treichville

10 August 2026
13:30

Boxscore

Central African Republic	43–86	Uganda
Scoring by quarter: 8–15, 12–32, 14–21, 9–18

Salle Polyvalente, Treichville

10 August 2026
16:00

Boxscore

Kenya	28–66	Ivory Coast
Scoring by quarter: 10–16, 9–16, 6–12, 3–22

Salle Polyvalente, Treichville
Attendance: 2,500

=== Group B ===
Pos	Team	Pld	W	L	PF	PA	PD	Pts	Qualification
1	Mali	3	3	0	289	107	+182	6	Quarterfinals
2	Egypt	3	2	1	241	146	+95	5	Quarterfinals
3	Morocco	3	1	2	125	237	−112	4	9th–12th place playoffs
4	Benin	3	0	3	113	278	−165	3	9th–12th place playoffs

Source: FIBA Africa
Rules for classification: 1) Points; 2) Head-to-head results; 3) Points difference; 4) Points scored.

6 August 2026
11:00

Boxscore

Benin	20–124	Mali
Scoring by quarter: 9–32, 7–32, 2–30, 2–30

Salle Polyvalente, Treichville
Attendance: 100

6 August 2026
13:30

Boxscore

Morocco	36–89	Egypt
Scoring by quarter: 7–21, 9–32, 6–15, 14–21

Salle Polyvalente, Treichville
Attendance: 120

8 August 2026
13:30

Boxscore

Egypt	95–48	Benin
Scoring by quarter: 26–15, 23–6, 22–6, 24–21

Salle Polyvalente, Treichville

8 August 2026
18:30

Boxscore

Mali	103–30	Morocco
Scoring by quarter: 22–11, 21–5, 33–7, 27–7

Salle Polyvalente, Treichville

10 August 2026
11:00

Boxscore

Morocco	59–45	Benin
Scoring by quarter: 10–11, 15–12, 17–6, 17–16

Salle Polyvalente, Treichville
Attendance: 100

10 August 2026
18:30

Boxscore

Mali	62–57	Egypt
Scoring by quarter: 13–16, 13–9, 15–17, 21–15

Salle Polyvalente, Treichville
Attendance: 3,000

=== Group C ===
Pos	Team	Pld	W	L	PF	PA	PD	Pts	Qualification
1	Cameroon	3	3	0	197	155	+42	6	Quarterfinals
2	Nigeria	3	2	1	198	165	+33	5	Quarterfinals
3	Tunisia	3	1	2	145	158	−13	4	Quarterfinals
4	Senegal	3	0	3	113	175	−62	3	9th–12th place playoffs

Source: FIBA Africa
Rules for classification: 1) Points; 2) Head-to-head results; 3) Points difference; 4) Points scored.

5 August 2026
13:30

Boxscore

Tunisia	50–54	Nigeria
Scoring by quarter: 15–13, 10–14, 19–16, 6–11

Salle Polyvalente, Treichville

5 August 2026
16:00

Boxscore

Cameroon	61–30	Senegal
Scoring by quarter: 25–12, 9–12, 21–3, 6–3

Salle Polyvalente, Treichville

7 August 2026
13:30

Boxscore

Senegal	43–44	Tunisia
Scoring by quarter: 14–8, 14–6, 0–13, 15–17

Salle Polyvalente, Treichville

7 August 2026
16:00

Boxscore

Nigeria	74–75 (OT)	Cameroon
Scoring by quarter: 19–15, 24–24, 9–11, 15–17, Overtime: 7–8

Salle Polyvalente, Treichville

9 August 2026
13:30

Boxscore

Cameroon	61–51	Tunisia
Scoring by quarter: 11–15, 11–10, 18–12, 21–14

Salle Polyvalente, Treichville

9 August 2026
16:00

Boxscore

Nigeria	70–40	Senegal
Scoring by quarter: 21–4, 24–14, 12–13, 13–9

Salle Polyvalente, Treichville

== Group phase overall ranking ==
Rank	Team
1	Mali
2	Ivory Coast
3	Cameroon
4	Egypt
5	Uganda
6	Nigeria
7	Tunisia
8	Kenya
9	Morocco
10	Senegal
11	Benin
12	Central African Republic

Advanced to quarterfinals
Dropped to 9th–12th place playoffs

== 9th–12th place playoffs ==
9th–12th place semifinals
9	Morocco	75
12	Central African Republic	35
10	Senegal	66
11	Benin	39

9th place game
Morocco	28
Senegal	58
11th place game
Central African Republic	41
Benin	63

=== 9th–12th place semifinals ===
12 August 2026
13:00

Boxscore

Morocco	75–35	Central African Republic
Scoring by quarter: 10–8, 24–8, 17–6, 24–13

Salle Polyvalente, Treichville
Attendance: 100

12 August 2026
15:30

Boxscore

Senegal	66–39	Benin
Scoring by quarter: 12–12, 18–12, 15–5, 21–10

Salle Polyvalente, Treichville
Attendance: 100

==== 11th place game ====
13 August 2026
13:00

Boxscore

Central African Republic	41–63	Benin
Scoring by quarter: 12–14, 8–17, 11–20, 10–12

Salle Polyvalente, Treichville

==== 9th place game ====
13 August 2026
18:00

Boxscore

Morocco	28–58	Senegal
Scoring by quarter: 4–24, 14–6, 5–20, 5–8

Salle Polyvalente, Treichville

== Championship playoffs ==
5th place game
Uganda	34
Cameroon	81
7th place game
Kenya	43
Tunisia	69

5th–8th place semifinals
Kenya	46
Uganda	53
Tunisia	44
Cameroon	68

Quarterfinals
1	Mali	93
8	Kenya	22
4	Egypt	80
5	Uganda	50
2	Ivory Coast	45
7	Tunisia	28
3	Cameroon	45
6	Nigeria	75

Semifinals
Mali	57
Egypt	55
Ivory Coast	50
Nigeria	53

Final
Mali	77
Nigeria	68
3rd place game
Egypt	60
Ivory Coast	52

=== Quarterfinals ===
12 August 2026
13:00

Boxscore

Mali	93–22	Kenya
Scoring by quarter: 28–11, 20–9, 28–0, 17–2

Palais des Sports de Treichville
Attendance: 150

12 August 2026
15:30

Boxscore

Cameroon	45–75	Nigeria
Scoring by quarter: 8–12, 12–28, 19–15, 6–12
Pts: M. Messina 11; Rebs: E. Toyounon 14; Asts: Malengue, Poliwa 3		Pts: F. J. Anari 16; Rebs: P. G. Aladelua 10; Asts: F. J. Anari 8

Palais des Sports de Treichville
Attendance: 1,500

12 August 2026
18:00

Boxscore

Ivory Coast	45–28	Tunisia
Scoring by quarter: 14–3, 7–8, 14–5, 10–12

Palais des Sports de Treichville
Attendance: 2,000

12 August 2026
20:30

Boxscore

Egypt	80–50	Uganda
Scoring by quarter: 23–17, 20–13, 20–11, 17–9

Palais des Sports de Treichville
Attendance: 150

=== 5th–8th place semifinals ===
14 August 2026
13:00

Boxscore

Kenya	46–53	Uganda
Scoring by quarter: 6–8, 10–18, 17–16, 13–11

Salle Polyvalente, Treichville
Attendance: 100

14 August 2026
18:00

Boxscore

Tunisia	44–68	Cameroon
Scoring by quarter: 6–16, 7–18, 18–13, 13–21

Salle Polyvalente, Treichville
Attendance: 100

==== 7th place game ====
15 August 2026
13:00

Boxscore

Kenya	43–69	Tunisia
Scoring by quarter: 3–23, 19–9, 11–16, 10–21

Salle Polyvalente, Treichville
Attendance: 100

==== 5th place game ====
15 August 2026
18:00

Boxscore

Uganda	34–81	Cameroon
Scoring by quarter: 4–24, 9–16, 10–18, 11–23

Salle Polyvalente, Treichville

=== Semifinals ===
14 August 2026
15:00

Boxscore

Mali	57–55	Egypt
Scoring by quarter: 16–14, 16–15, 16–13, 9–13

Palais des Sports de Treichville
Attendance: 1,000

14 August 2026
18:00

Boxscore

Ivory Coast	50–53	Nigeria
Scoring by quarter: 11–12, 12–15, 16–14, 11–12
Pts: F. Diouf - 12; Rebs: F. Diarra - 10; Asts: F. Diouf, M. Adahe - 3		Pts: F. J Anari - 15; Rebs: N. Ibidunni - 12; Asts: F. J Anari - 4

Palais des Sports de Treichville
Attendance: 3,000

==== 3rd place game ====
16 August 2026
11:00

Boxscore

Egypt	60–52	Ivory Coast
Scoring by quarter: 18–16, 16–8, 8–15, 18–13

Palais des Sports de Treichville
Attendance: 300

==== Final ====
16 August 2026
17:00

Boxscore

Mali	77–68	Nigeria
Scoring by quarter: 26–15, 13–15, 13–13, 25–25

Palais des Sports de Treichville
Attendance: 2,000

== Final standings ==
Rank	Team	Record
1st place, gold medalist(s)	Mali	6–0
2nd place, silver medalist(s)	Nigeria	4–2
3rd place, bronze medalist(s)	Egypt	4–2
4	Ivory Coast	4–2
5	Cameroon	5–1
6	Uganda	3–3
7	Tunisia	2–4
8	Kenya	1–5
9	Senegal	2–3
10	Morocco	2–3
11	Benin	1–4
12	Central African Republic	0–5

Qualified for the 2027 FIBA Under-19 Women's Basketball World Cup
