= 2008 FIBA Africa Under-18 Championship for Women =

2008 FIBA U18 Women's AfroBasket
9th FIBA Under-18 Women's African Basketball Championship

Tournament details
- Host country: Tunisia
- Dates: October 8–17
- Teams: 11
- Venues: 2 (in 2 host cities)

Final positions
- Champions: Mali (4th title)

Tournament statistics
- MVP: (Mali) Laoudy Maiga
- Top scorer: (Nigeria) Akashili 22.8
- Top rebounds: (Mozambique) Tanucha 13.5
- Top assists: (Mali) F.Traoré 2.8
- PPG (Team): Mali 78
- RPG (Team): Tunisia 43.8
- APG (Team): Mali 9.8

Official website
- 2008 FIBA Africa U18 Championship for Women

The 2008 FIBA Africa Under-18 Championship for Women was the 9th FIBA Africa Under-18 Championship for Women, organized by FIBA Africa and played under the auspices of the Fédération Internationale de Basketball, the basketball sport governing body and the African zone thereof and qualified for the 2009 World Cup. The tournament was held from October 3–12 in Rades and Ezzahra, Tunisia and won by Mali.

The tournament qualified both the winner and the runner-up for the 2009 Under-19 Women's World Cup.

== Format ==
- The 11 teams were divided into two groups (Groups A+B) for the preliminary round.
- Round robin for the preliminary round; the top four teams advanced to the quarterfinals.
- From there on a knockout system was used until the final.

== Draw ==
| Group A | Group B |
|---|---|
| Benin; Ivory Coast; Mozambique; Tunisia; Uganda | Angola (Democratic Republic of the Congo) DR Congo; Guinea; Kenya; Mali; Nigeria |

== Preliminary round ==
=== Group A ===
| Qualified for the quarter-finals |

| Team | Pld | W | L | PF | PA | PD | Pts |
|---|---|---|---|---|---|---|---|
| Tunisia | 4 | 4 | 0 | 251 | 174 | +77 | 8 |
| Mozambique | 4 | 3 | 1 | 280 | 169 | +111 | 7 |
| Ivory Coast | 4 | 2 | 2 | 208 | 163 | +45 | 6 |
| Benin | 4 | 1 | 3 | 161 | 239 | -78 | 5 |
| Uganda | 4 | 0 | 4 | 136 | 291 | -155 | 4 |

3 October 2008
13:00

Boxscore

| Ivory Coast | 42–57 | Mozambique |
Scoring by quarter: 6-12, 13-13, 12-20, 11-12
| Pts: Garikoe 13; Rebs: Kassi, Zouzou 3 Asts: Kouyate 2 | | Pts: Tanucha 20; Rebs: Tanucha 13; Asts: Ingvild, A.Jaime 1 |

Rades

3 October 2008
17:00

Boxscore

| Tunisia | 58–42 | Benin |
Scoring by quarter: 16-13, 10-8, 18-6, 14-15
| Pts: n/a Rebs: n/a | | Pts: n/a Rebs: n/a |

Rades

4 October 2008
17:00

Boxscore

| Mozambique | 54–58 | Tunisia |
Scoring by quarter: 7-17, 17-12, 19-13, 11-16
| Pts: Cecília 25; Rebs: Cecília 17; Asts: Ingvild, Delmira 1 | | Pts: Inoubli 14; Rebs: Mefteh 13; Asts: Mechlia, Jrad 2 |

Rades

6 October 2008
13:00

Boxscore

| Benin | 52–48 | Uganda |
Scoring by quarter: 7-9, 9-12, 16-11, 20-16
| Pts: Adjai 26; Rebs: Dagon 17; Asts: Adjai, Salou 1 | | Pts: Karungi 13; Rebs: Karungi 13; Asts: Byanjeru, Nabasumba 2 |

Rades

5 October 2008
15:00

Boxscore

| Benin | 31–61 | Ivory Coast |
Scoring by quarter: 2-15, 10-19, 8-15, 11-12
| Pts: Kondoh 7 Rebs: Dagon 14; Asts: Salami 1 | | Pts: Kolga 17; Rebs: Zamaty, Zouzou 9 Asts: 0 |

Rades

5 October 2008
17:00

Boxscore

| Tunisia | 77–38 | Uganda |
Scoring by quarter: 8-16, 20-6, 14-4, 35-12
| Pts: Inoubli 20; Rebs: Inoubli 13; Asts: three players 2 | | Pts: Nabasumba 11; Rebs: Kyamazima 9 Asts: 0 |

Rades

7 October 2008
15:00

Boxscore

| Mozambique | 72–36 | Benin |
Scoring by quarter: 23-9, 12-6, 23-13, 14-8
| Pts: Tanucha 20; Rebs: Tanucha 18; Asts: three players 2 | | Pts: Houessou 10; Rebs: Houessou, Kouke 5 Asts: Kondoh 1 |

Rades

7 October 2008
17:00

Boxscore

| Uganda | 17–65 | Ivory Coast |
Scoring by quarter: 4-12, 3-15, 4-10, 6-28
| Pts: Kyamazima 6 Rebs: Karungi 5 Asts: Namirimu 1 | | Pts: Kouyate 16; Rebs: Kouyate 11; Asts: Garikoe 2 |

Rades

8 October 2008
15:00

Boxscore

| Uganda | 33–97 | Mozambique |
Scoring by quarter: 7-23, 9-19, 9-29, 8-26
| Pts: Kyamazima 11; Rebs: Karungi 8 Asts: Karungi, Tamale 1 | | Pts: Delmira 16; Rebs: Tanucha 12; Asts: Ornélia 2 |

Rades

8 October 2008
17:00

Boxscore

| Tunisia | 58–40 | Ivory Coast |
Scoring by quarter: 4-9, 12-2, 25-15, 17-14
| Pts: Inoubli 16; Rebs: Mefteh 12; Asts: three players 1 | | Pts: Kouyate, Kouadio 10; Rebs: Cisse 9 Asts: Garikoe 1 |

Rades

=== Group B ===
| Team | Pld | W | L | PF | PA | PD | Pts |
|---|---|---|---|---|---|---|---|
| Mali | 5 | 5 | 0 | 251 | 174 | +77 | 10 |
| Nigeria | 5 | 3 | 2 | 315 | 317 | -2 | 8 |
| Guinea | 5 | 3 | 2 | 241 | 284 | -43 | 8 |
| Kenya | 5 | 2 | 3 | 240 | 282 | -42 | 7 |
| (Democratic Republic of the Congo) DR Congo | 5 | 1 | 4 | 259 | 286 | -27 | 6 |
| Angola | 5 | 1 | 4 | 212 | 318 | -106 | 6 |

3 October 2008
11:00

Boxscore

| Kenya | 45–46 | Guinea |
Scoring by quarter: 13-15, 16-4, 10-6, 6-21
| Pts: Auma 20; Rebs: Auma 12; Asts: three players 1 | | Pts: Touré 28; Rebs: Sidimé 8 Asts: Bangoura 2 |

Ezzahra

3 October 2008
13:00

Boxscore

| Mali | 77–32 | Angola |
Scoring by quarter: 23-9, 15-2, 17-4, 22-17
| Pts: Maiga 15; Rebs: Coulibaly 8 Asts: Traoré 5 | | Pts: C.Dundão 9 Rebs: Javete 5 Asts: 0 |

Ezzahra

9 October 2008
15:00

Boxscore

| Nigeria | 81–64 | (Democratic Republic of the Congo) DR Congo |
Scoring by quarter: 19-9, 20-20, 21-17, 21-18
| Pts: Akashili 38; Rebs: Akashili 11; Asts: Samuel 7 | | Pts: Nyota 22; Rebs: Nyota 9 Asts: Teba 4 |

Ezzahra

4 October 2008
15:00

Boxscore

| Guinea | 24–81 | Mali |
Scoring by quarter: 7-22, 5-21, 7-18, 5-20
| Pts: Sidibe, Sidimé 6 Rebs: Sidibe 7 Asts: Bangoura 2 | | Pts: Sacko 22; Rebs: Sacko 6 Asts: three players 2 |

Ezzahra

6 October 2008
15:00

Boxscore

| Kenya | 57–56 | Nigeria |
Scoring by quarter: 10-10, 16-10, 13-18, 18-18
| Pts: Olumasi 16; Rebs: Olumasi 9 Asts: three players 2 | | Pts: Akashili 18; Rebs: Akashili 11; Asts: Gede 1 |

Ezzahra

6 October 2008
17:00

Boxscore

| Angola | 28–58 | (Democratic Republic of the Congo) DR Congo |
Scoring by quarter: 6-14, 8-10, 8-20, 6-14
| Pts: n/a Rebs: n/a | | Pts: n/a Rebs: n/a |

Ezzahra

5 October 2008
13:00

Boxscore

| Angola | 56–49 | Kenya |
Scoring by quarter: 14-11, 13-6, 11-10, 18-22
| Pts: E.Pascoal 17; Rebs: C.Dundão 10; Asts: Javete, R.Queta 1 | | Pts: Olumasi 19; Rebs: Olumasi 11; Asts: Adhiambo 6 |

Ezzahra

5 October 2008
15:00

Boxscore

| Mali | 75–47 | (Democratic Republic of the Congo) DR Congo |
Scoring by quarter: 20-9, 14-19, 21-9, 20-10
| Pts: n/a Rebs: n/a | | Pts: n/a Rebs: n/a |

Ezzahra

5 October 2008
17:00

Boxscore

| Guinea | 61–70 (OT) | Nigeria |
Scoring by quarter: 12-15, 11-13, 16-17, 18-12, Overtime: 4-13
| Pts: Touré 22; Rebs: Sidibe 11; Asts: Diallo, Bangoura 4 | | Pts: Ewaoche 24; Rebs: Ewaoche 9 Asts: three players 1 |

Ezzahra

7 October 2008
09:00

Boxscore

| DR Congo (Democratic Republic of the Congo) | 48–56 | Kenya |
Scoring by quarter: 6-15, 10-16, 12-15, 20-10
| Pts: Nyota 19; Rebs: Mpiana 17; Asts: three players 1 | | Pts: Olumasi 22; Rebs: Olumasi 13; Asts: Adhiambo 5 |

Ezzahra

7 October 2008
11:00

Boxscore

| Guinea | 64–46 | Angola |
Scoring by quarter: 9-15, 19-7, 15-12, 21-12
| Pts: n/a Rebs: n/a | | Pts: n/a Rebs: n/a |

Ezzahra

7 October 2008
13:00

Boxscore

| Mali | 85–38 | Nigeria |
Scoring by quarter: 22-11, 15-13, 24-5, 24-9
| Pts: n/a Rebs: n/a | | Pts: n/a Rebs: n/a |

Ezzahra

8 October 2008
13:00

Boxscore

| Kenya | 33–76 | Mali |
Scoring by quarter: 10-15, 14-16, 3-18, 6-27
| Pts: Olumasi 15; Rebs: Auma 13; Asts: Auma, Odonge 1 | | Pts: Maiga 32; Rebs: Sacko 9 Asts: Maiga 3 |

Ezzahra

8 October 2008
15:00

Boxscore

| Nigeria | 70–50 | Angola |
Scoring by quarter: 23-16, 13-6, 19-16, 15-12
| Pts: Akashili 15; Rebs: Abiodun 7 Asts: Ewaoche 3 | | Pts: E.Pascoal 23; Rebs: C.Dundão 8 Asts: Fineza, Javete 1 |

Ezzahra

8 October 2008
17:00

Boxscore

| DR Congo (Democratic Republic of the Congo) | 42–46 | Guinea |
Scoring by quarter: 8-15, 10-9, 12-7, 12-15
| Pts: Ilunga 16; Rebs: Bakenga 17; Asts: Bakenga 2 | | Pts: Touré 17; Rebs: Sidibe 10; Asts: Camara, Bangoura 1 |

Ezzahra

== Knockout stage ==
Championship bracket

Quarter-finals
Fri 10 Oct 2008 – 11:00
Mali | 94
Benin | 27
Fri 10 Oct 2008 – 13:00
Guinea | 32
Mozambique | 78
Fri 10 Oct 2008 – 17:00
Tunisia | 78
Kenya | 65
Fri 10 Oct 2008 – 15:00
Ivory Coast | 53
Nigeria | 54

Semi-finals
Sat 11 Oct 2008 – 15:00
Mali | 62
Mozambique | 28
Sat 11 Oct 2008 – 17:00
Tunisia | 65
Nigeria | 64

Final
Sun 12 Oct 2008 – 17:00
Tunisia | 35
Mali | 57
Third place
Sun 12 Oct 2008 – 15:00
Nigeria | 63
Mozambique | 69

5-8th bracket

5th-8th place
Sat 11 Oct 2008 – 13:00
Benin | 40
Guinea | 49
Sat 11 Oct 2008 – 15:00
Kenya | 34
Ivory Coast | 45

Fifth place
Sun 12 Oct 2008 – 13:00
Ivory Coast | 47
Guinea | 28
Seventh place
Sun 12 Oct 2008 – 11:00
Kenya | 71
Benin | 37

=== 9–12th classification ===
10 October 2008
13:00

Boxscore

| Angola | 52–36 | Uganda |
Scoring by quarter: 21-9, 14-5, 12-10, 5-12
| Pts: Fineza 20; Rebs: Javete 5 Asts: 0 | | Pts: Nabasumba 16; Rebs: Namirimu 6 Asts: Karungi 1 |

Ezzahra

=== Quarterfinals ===
10 October 2008
11:00

Boxscore

| Mali | 94–27 | Benin |
Scoring by quarter: 25-8, 29-8, 26-4, 14-7
| Pts: Sacko 16; Rebs: Coulibaly 11; Asts: Traoré 4 | | Pts: Kondoh 12; Rebs: Houessou 7 Asts: Houessou, Salami 1 |

Rades

10 October 2008
13:00

Boxscore

| Guinea | 32–78 | Mozambique |
Scoring by quarter: 7-14, 4-13, 18-27, 3-24
| Pts: Sidimé 14; Rebs: Sidimé 13; Asts: Camara 1 | | Pts: Tanucha 24; Rebs: Tanucha 17; Asts: five players 1 |

Rades

10 October 2008
15:00

Boxscore

| Ivory Coast | 53–54 | Nigeria |
Scoring by quarter: 11-10, 14-16, 8-11, 20-17
| Pts: Kouyate 27; Rebs: Kouyate 15; Asts: Kolga 5 | | Pts: Akashili 17; Rebs: Oladele 11; Asts: Samuel 1 |

Rades

10 October 2008
17:00

Boxscore

| Tunisia | 78–65 | Kenya |
Scoring by quarter: 16-9, 17-10, 23-26, 22-20
| Pts: n/a Rebs: n/a | | Pts: n/a Rebs: n/a |

Rades

=== 9th place ===
11 October 2008
11:00

Boxscore

| Angola | 64–66 | (Democratic Republic of the Congo) DR Congo |
Scoring by quarter: 6-18, 22-18, 17-13, 19-17
| Pts: E.Pascoal 26; Rebs: C.Estevão 7 Asts: three players 1 | | Pts: Ilunga 23; Rebs: Nyota 14; Asts: Teba, Wanani 2 |

Ezzahra

=== Classification 5–8 ===
11 October 2008
13:00

Boxscore

| Benin | 40–49 | Guinea |
Scoring by quarter: 9-7, 16-11, 9-15, 6-16
| Pts: Adjai 17; Rebs: Adjai 8 Asts: 0 | | Pts: Sidimé 14; Rebs: Sidimé 11; Asts: Diallo 1 |

Ezzahra

11 October 2008
15:00

Boxscore

| Kenya | 34–45 | Ivory Coast |
Scoring by quarter: 15-13, 6-4, 2-22, 11-6
| Pts: Auma 14; Rebs: Auma 6 Asts: Odonge, H.Oketch 1 | | Pts: Kouyate 15; Rebs: Kouyate, Zamaty 8 Asts: Kolga, Kere 1 |

Ezzahra

=== Semifinals ===
11 October 2008
15:00

Boxscore

| Mali | 62–28 | Mozambique |
Scoring by quarter: 18-7, 17-6, 19-8, 8-7
| Pts: Sacko 17; Rebs: Mariko 8 Asts: Maiga 3 | | Pts: Delmira 10; Rebs: Tanucha 12; Asts: 0 |

Rades

11 October 2008
17:00

Boxscore

| Tunisia | 65–64 | Nigeria |
Scoring by quarter: 19-11, 14-20, 19-14, 13-19
| Pts: Abdelghani 23; Rebs: Arami 15; Asts: Abdelghani, Mechlia 2 | | Pts: Akashili 29; Rebs: Arami 11; Asts: Samuel 1 |

Rades

=== 7th place ===
12 October 2008
11:00

| Kenya | 71–37 | Benin |
| Pts: n/a Rebs: n/a | | Pts: n/a Rebs: n/a |

Rades

=== 5th place ===
12 October 2008
13:00

| Ivory Coast | 47–28 | Guinea |
| Pts: n/a Rebs: n/a | | Pts: n/a Rebs: n/a |

Rades

=== Bronze medal game ===
12 October 2008
15:00

| Nigeria | 63–69 | Mozambique |
| Pts: n/a Rebs: n/a | | Pts: n/a Rebs: n/a |

Rades

=== Gold medal game ===
12 October 2008
17:00

| Tunisia | 35–57 | Mali |
| Pts: n/a Rebs: n/a | | Pts: n/a Rebs: n/a |

Rades

== Final standings ==
| Qualified for the 2009 Women's World U19 Championship |

| Rank | Team | Record |
|---|---|---|
| Gold medal | Mali | 8–0 |
| Silver medal | Tunisia | 6–1 |
| Bronze medal | Mozambique | 5–2 |
| 4. | Nigeria | 4–4 |
| 5. | Ivory Coast | 4–3 |
| 6. | Guinea | 4–4 |
| 7. | Kenya | 3–5 |
| 8. | Benin | 1–6 |
| 9. | (Democratic Republic of the Congo) DR Congo | 2–4 |
| 10. | Angola | 2–5 |
| 11. | Uganda | 0–5 |

Mali roster
Adama Sissoko, Aissata Djibo, Aissata Traoré, Aminata Mariko, Astan Dabo, Djenebou Sacko, Fatoumata Traoré, Kankou Coulibaly, Laoudy Maiga, Nassira Traore, Ouleymatou Coulibaly, Sega Bah Coach:

== All Tournament Team ==
| G | (Nigeria) | Nkechi Akashili |
| F | (Mali) | Laoudy Maiga |
| F | (Tunisia) | Zbeyda Arami |
| C | (Kenya) | Mildred Olumasi |
| C | (Ivory Coast) | Kani Kouyate |

2008 FIBA Africa Under-18 Championship winner

Mali
Fourth title

Most Valuable Player
(Mali) Laoudy Maiga

== Statistical Leaders ==
=== Individual Tournament Highs ===
Points

| Rank | Name | G | Pts | PPG |
|---|---|---|---|---|
| 1 | (Nigeria) Nkechi Akashili | 6 | 137 | 22.8 |
| 2 | (Mali) Laoudy Maiga | 5 | 85 | 17 |
| 3 | (Angola) Elisabete Pascoal | 5 | 83 | 16.6 |
| 4 | (Democratic Republic of the Congo) Mireille Nyota | 4 | 62 | 15.5 |
| 5 | (Ivory Coast) Kani Kouyate | 6 | 92 | 15.3 |
| 6 | (Angola) Fineza Eusébio | 5 | 72 | 14.4 |
| 7 | (Kenya) Mildred Olumasi | 6 | 84 | 14 |
| 8 | (Mozambique) Leia Dongue | 6 | 83 | 13.8 |
| 9 | (Mali) Djenebou Sacko | 5 | 69 | 13.8 |
| 10 | (Guinea) Mariama Touré | 6 | 82 | 13.7 |

Rebounds

| Rank | Name | G | Rbs | RPG |
|---|---|---|---|---|
| 1 | (Mozambique) Leia Dongue | 6 | 81 | 13.5 |
| 2 | (Democratic Republic of the Congo) Mireille Nyota | 4 | 48 | 12 |
| 3 | (Tunisia) Zbeyda Arami | 4 | 45 | 11.2 |
| 4 | (Tunisia) Khouloud Mefteh | 4 | 37 | 9.2 |
| 5 | (Kenya) Purity Odhiambo | 6 | 52 | 8.7 |
| 6 | (Nigeria) Temitope Oladele | 6 | 50 | 8.3 |
| 6 | (Kenya) Mildred Olumasi | 6 | 50 | 8.3 |
| 8 | (Mozambique) Cecília Henriques | 6 | 49 | 8.2 |
| 9 | (Guinea) Fanta Sidimé | 6 | 48 | 8 |
| 10 | (Guinea) Moussougbe Sidibe | 6 | 47 | 7.8 |

Assists

| Rank | Name | G | Ast | APG |
|---|---|---|---|---|
| 1 | (Mali) Fatoumata Traoré | 5 | 14 | 2.8 |
| 2 | (Kenya) Everline Adhiambo | 6 | 13 | 2.2 |
| 3 | (Mali) Laoudy Maiga | 5 | 10 | 2 |
| 4 | (Nigeria) Theresa Samuel | 6 | 10 | 1.7 |
| 5 | (Guinea) Aissatou Bangoura | 6 | 9 | 1.5 |
| 6 | (Tunisia) Dhouha Abdelghani | 4 | 6 | 1.5 |
| 6 | (Tunisia) Monia Mechlia | 4 | 6 | 1.5 |
| 8 | (Ivory Coast) Maimonatou Kolga | 5 | 7 | 1.4 |
| 9 | (Mali) Djenebou Sacko | 5 | 6 | 1.2 |
| 10 | (Mali) Aissata Djibo | 5 | 5 | 1 |

Steals

| Rank | Name | G | Sts | SPG |
|---|---|---|---|---|
| 1 | (Mali) Djenebou Sacko | 5 | 35 | 7 |
| 2 | (Ivory Coast) Kani Kouyate | 6 | 36 | 6 |
| 3 | (Tunisia) Dhouha Abdelghani | 4 | 21 | 5.3 |
| 4 | (Guinea) Moussogbe Sidibe | 6 | 26 | 4.3 |
| 5 | (Nigeria) Ojoma Ewaoche | 6 | 25 | 4.2 |
| 6 | (Mali) Laoudy Maiga | 5 | 21 | 4.2 |
| 7 | (Kenya) Helen Oketch | 6 | 24 | 4 |
| 8 | (Kenya) Everline Adhiambo | 6 | 23 | 3.8 |
| 9 | (Kenya) Joyce Misita | 6 | 22 | 3.7 |
| 9 | (Guinea) Mariama Touré | 6 | 22 | 3.7 |

Blocks

| Rank | Name | G | Bks | BPG |
|---|---|---|---|---|
| 1 | (Guinea) Moussougbe Sidibe | 6 | 11 | 1.8 |
| 2 | (Democratic Republic of the Congo) Mireille Nyota | 4 | 7 | 1.8 |
| 3 | (Ivory Coast) Kani Kouyate | 6 | 7 | 1.2 |
| 4 | (Ivory Coast) Ahissa Kassi | 6 | 6 | 1 |
| 5 | (Mali) Astan Dabo | 5 | 5 | 1 |
| 5 | (Mali) Djenebou Sacko | 5 | 5 | 1 |
| 7 | (Ivory Coast) Mamiky Cisse | 6 | 5 | 0.8 |
| 7 | (Ivory Coast) Korotoum Diarawa | 6 | 5 | 0.8 |
| 9 | (Uganda) Chantal Aching | 5 | 4 | 0.8 |
| 10 | (Tunisia) Zbeyda Arami | 4 | 3 | 0.8 |

Turnovers

| Rank | Name | G | Tos | TPG |
|---|---|---|---|---|
| 1 | (Uganda) Angela Namirimu | 5 | 44 | 8.8 |
| 2 | (Benin) Patricia Adjai | 5 | 32 | 6.4 |
| 3 | (Nigeria) Nkechi Akashili | 6 | 35 | 5.8 |
| 4 | (Nigeria) Theresa Samuel | 6 | 33 | 5.5 |
| 4 | (Angola) Fineza Eusébio | 5 | 26 | 5.2 |
| 6 | (Nigeria) Ojoma Ewaoche | 6 | 28 | 4.7 |
| 6 | (Benin) Aishatou Kondoh | 5 | 23 | 4.6 |
| 8 | (Tunisia) Monia Mechlia | 4 | 18 | 4.5 |
| 9 | (Democratic Republic of the Congo) Mireille Nyota | 4 | 18 | 4.5 |
| 10 | (Uganda) Chantal Aching | 5 | 22 | 4.4 |

2-point field goal percentage

| Pos | Name | A | M | % |
|---|---|---|---|---|
| 1 | (Tunisia) Lilia Inoubli | 26 | 18 | 69.2 |
| 2 | (Mali) Djenebou Sacko | 43 | 29 | 67.4 |
| 3 | (Mali) Laoudy Maiga | 53 | 32 | 60.4 |
| 4 | (Angola) Elisabete Pascoal | 55 | 33 | 60 |
| 5 | (Mozambique) Leia Dongue | 59 | 31 | 52.5 |
| 6 | (Tunisia) Dhouha Abdelghani | 42 | 22 | 52.4 |
| 7 | (Kenya) Mildred Olumasi | 76 | 36 | 47.4 |
| 8 | (Benin) Patricia Adjai | 43 | 20 | 46.5 |
| 9 | (Ivory Coast) Kani Kouyate | 69 | 32 | 46.4 |
| 10 | (Nigeria) Nkechi Akashili | 95 | 43 | 45.3 |

3-point field goal percentage

| Pos | Name | A | M | % |
|---|---|---|---|---|
| 1 | (Mali) Aissata Djibo | 12 | 6 | 50 |
| 2 | (Mozambique) Cecília Henriques | 15 | 5 | 33.3 |
| 3 | (Mali) Fatoumata Traoré | 21 | 6 | 28.6 |
| 4 | (Nigeria) Nkechi Akashili | 14 | 4 | 28.6 |
| 5 | (Ivory Coast) Habibou Karikoe | 22 | 6 | 27.3 |
| 6 | (Uganda) Yvonne Byanjeru | 16 | 4 | 25 |
| 7 | (Tunisia) Lilia Inoubli | 12 | 3 | 25 |
| 8 | (Angola) Elisabete Pascoal | 12 | 3 | 25 |
| 9 | (Nigeria) Ojoma Ewaoche | 22 | 5 | 22.7 |
| 10 | (Mali) Djenebou Sacko | 14 | 3 | 21.4 |

Free throw percentage

| Pos | Name | A | M | % |
|---|---|---|---|---|
| 1 | (Nigeria) Nkechi Akashili | 49 | 39 | 79.6 |
| 2 | (Ivory Coast) Kani Kouyate | 28 | 22 | 78.6 |
| 3 | (Kenya) Purity Odhiambo | 28 | 19 | 67.9 |
| 4 | (Kenya) Diana Odonge | 20 | 13 | 65 |
| 5 | (Nigeria) Ojoma Ewaoche | 22 | 14 | 63.6 |
| 6 | (Angola) Fineza Eusébio | 35 | 22 | 62.9 |
| 7 | (Democratic Republic of the Congo) Mireille Nyota | 33 | 20 | 60.6 |
| 8 | (Mali) Laoudy Maiga | 30 | 18 | 60 |
| 9 | (Guinea) Mariama Touré | 25 | 15 | 60 |
| 10 | (Nigeria) Tobiloba Abiodun | 22 | 13 | 59.1 |

=== Individual Game Highs ===
| Department | Name | Total | Opponent |
|---|---|---|---|
| Points | (Nigeria) Nkechi Akashili | 38 | DR Congo |
| Rebounds | (Mozambique) Leia Dongue | 18 | Benin |
| Assists | (Nigeria) Theresa Samuel | 7 | DR Congo |
| Steals | (Kenya) Everline Adhiambo (Ivory Coast) Kani Kouyate | 14 | DR Congo; Uganda |
| Blocks | (Ivory Coast) Ahissa Kassi | 6 | Tunisia |
| 2-point field goal percentage | (Mali) Djenebou Sacko | 87.5% (7/8) | Mozambique |
| 3-point field goal percentage | (Mali) Aissata Djibo | 100% (3/3) | Benin |
| Free throw percentage | (Nigeria) Nkechi Akashili | 100% (6/6) | Guinea |
| Turnovers | (Uganda) Angela Namirimu | 13 | Tunisia |

=== Team Tournament Highs ===
Points

| Rank | Name | G | Pts | PPG |
|---|---|---|---|---|
| 1 | Mali | 5 | 390 | 78 |
| 2 | Nigeria | 6 | 395 | 65.8 |
| 3 | Tunisia | 4 | 258 | 64.5 |
| 4 | Mozambique | 6 | 386 | 64.3 |
| 5 | DR Congo | 4 | 220 | 55 |
| 6 | Ivory Coast | 6 | 306 | 51 |
| 7 | Angola | 5 | 254 | 50.8 |
| 8 | Kenya | 6 | 274 | 45.7 |
| 9 | Guinea | 6 | 258 | 43 |
| 10 | Benin | 5 | 186 | 37.2 |

Rebounds

| Rank | Name | G | Rbs | RPG |
|---|---|---|---|---|
| 1 | Tunisia | 4 | 175 | 43.8 |
| 2 | Mozambique | 6 | 233 | 38.8 |
| 2 | DR Congo | 4 | 152 | 38 |
| 4 | Mali | 5 | 174 | 34.8 |
| 5 | Nigeria | 6 | 200 | 33.3 |
| 6 | Ivory Coast | 6 | 198 | 33 |
| 7 | Guinea | 6 | 191 | 31.8 |
| 8 | Benin | 5 | 145 | 29 |
| 9 | Kenya | 6 | 162 | 27 |
| 10 | Uganda | 5 | 132 | 26.4 |

Assists

| Rank | Name | G | Ast | APG |
|---|---|---|---|---|
| 1 | Mali | 5 | 49 | 9.8 |
| 2 | Tunisia | 4 | 22 | 5.5 |
| 3 | DR Congo | 4 | 21 | 5.3 |
| 4 | Kenya | 6 | 31 | 5.2 |
| 5 | Guinea | 6 | 25 | 4.2 |
| 6 | Nigeria | 6 | 21 | 3.5 |
| 7 | Ivory Coast | 6 | 20 | 3.3 |
| 8 | Mozambique | 6 | 19 | 3.2 |
| 9 | Uganda | 5 | 10 | 2 |
| 10 | Angola | 5 | 7 | 1.4 |

Steals

| Rank | Name | G | Sts | SPG |
|---|---|---|---|---|
| 1 | Mali | 5 | 125 | 25 |
| 2 | Mozambique | 6 | 146 | 24.3 |
| 3 | Tunisia | 4 | 82 | 20.5 |
| 4 | Kenya | 6 | 120 | 20 |
| 5 | Ivory Coast | 6 | 117 | 19.5 |
| 6 | Guinea | 6 | 109 | 18.2 |
| 7 | Nigeria | 6 | 93 | 15.5 |
| 8 | Angola | 5 | 68 | 13.6 |
| 9 | Benin | 5 | 52 | 10.4 |
| 10 | DR Congo | 4 | 38 | 9.5 |

Blocks

| Rank | Name | G | Bks | BPG |
|---|---|---|---|---|
| 1 | Ivory Coast | 6 | 35 | 5.8 |
| 2 | Tunisia | 4 | 15 | 3.8 |
| 3 | Guinea | 6 | 16 | 2.7 |
| 4 | DR Congo | 4 | 10 | 2.5 |
| 5 | Mali | 5 | 12 | 2.4 |
| 6 | Angola | 5 | 10 | 2 |
| 7 | Uganda | 5 | 8 | 1.6 |
| 8 | Mozambique | 6 | 8 | 1.3 |
| 9 | Kenya | 6 | 5 | 0.8 |
| 9 | Nigeria | 6 | 5 | 0.8 |

Turnovers

| Rank | Name | G | Tos | TPG |
|---|---|---|---|---|
| 1 | Uganda | 5 | 143 | 28.6 |
| 2 | Benin | 5 | 138 | 27.6 |
| 3 | DR Congo | 4 | 108 | 27 |
| 4 | Tunisia | 4 | 107 | 26.8 |
| 5 | Guinea | 6 | 157 | 26.2 |
| 6 | Nigeria | 6 | 148 | 24.7 |
| 7 | Mozambique | 6 | 137 | 22.8 |
| 8 | Mali | 5 | 112 | 22.4 |
| 9 | Kenya | 6 | 132 | 22 |
| 10 | Angola | 5 | 106 | 21.2 |

2-point field goal percentage

| Pos | Name | A | M | % |
|---|---|---|---|---|
| 1 | Mali | 252 | 127 | 50.4 |
| 2 | Tunisia | 195 | 88 | 45.1 |
| 3 | Mozambique | 285 | 121 | 42.5 |
| 4 | Nigeria | 301 | 124 | 41.2 |
| 5 | Angola | 212 | 84 | 39.6 |
| 6 | Kenya | 269 | 101 | 37.5 |
| 7 | DR Congo | 205 | 72 | 35.1 |
| 8 | Ivory Coast | 276 | 96 | 34.8 |
| 9 | Uganda | 196 | 60 | 30.6 |
| 10 | Guinea | 310 | 94 | 30.3 |

3-point field goal percentage

| Pos | Name | A | M | % |
|---|---|---|---|---|
| 1 | Mali | 79 | 23 | 29.1 |
| 2 | Mozambique | 103 | 21 | 20.4 |
| 3 | Angola | 37 | 7 | 18.9 |
| 4 | DR Congo | 43 | 8 | 18.6 |
| 5 | Uganda | 50 | 9 | 18 |
| 6 | Nigeria | 67 | 11 | 16.4 |
| 7 | Ivory Coast | 120 | 19 | 15.8 |
| 8 | Tunisia | 65 | 10 | 15.4 |
| 9 | Guinea | 52 | 8 | 15.4 |
| 10 | Kenya | 50 | 5 | 10 |

Free throw percentage

| Pos | Name | A | M | % |
|---|---|---|---|---|
| 1 | Uganda | 39 | 25 | 64.1 |
| 2 | Nigeria | 184 | 114 | 62 |
| 3 | Ivory Coast | 94 | 57 | 60.6 |
| 4 | Angola | 117 | 65 | 55.6 |
| 5 | Kenya | 112 | 57 | 50.9 |
| 6 | Mali | 132 | 67 | 50.8 |
| 7 | DR Congo | 105 | 52 | 49.5 |
| 8 | Benin | 104 | 49 | 47.1 |
| 9 | Tunisia | 115 | 52 | 45.2 |
| 10 | Mozambique | 195 | 81 | 41.5 |

=== Team Game highs ===
| Department | Name | Total | Opponent |
|---|---|---|---|
| Points | Mozambique | 97 | Uganda |
| Rebounds | Mozambique | 59 | Benin |
| Assists | Mali | 15 | Benin |
| Steals | Mozambique | 41 | Guinea |
| Blocks | Ivory Coast | 23 | Tunisia |
| 2-point field goal percentage | Mali | 57.8% (26/45) | Angola |
| 3-point field goal percentage | Guinea | 52.9% (2/5) | Mozambique |
| Free throw percentage | Ivory Coast | 82.4% (14/17) | Benin |
| Turnovers | Guinea | 44 | Mozambique |

== See also ==
- 2009 FIBA Africa Championship for Women
