= Central African Republic women's national under-18 basketball team =

Central African Republic
- FIBA zone: FIBA Africa
- National federation: Fédération Centrafricaine de Basketball

U19 World Cup
- Appearances: None

U18 AfroBasket
- Appearances: 2
- Medals: None

The Central African Republic women's national under-18 basketball team is a national basketball team of the Central African Republic, administered by the Fédération Centrafricaine de Basketball. It represents the country in international women's under-18 basketball competitions.

== FIBA U18 Women's AfroBasket ==
So far, the Central African Republic made two participations at the FIBA U18 Women's AfroBasket was in 2004, where they finished in 7th place. In the 2026 FIBA U18 Women's AfroBasket they qualified under wildcard but finished 12th.

== See also ==
- Central African Republic women's national basketball team
- Central African Republic men's national under-18 basketball team
