= 2010 FIBA Africa Under-18 Championship for Women =

2010 FIBA U18 Women's AfroBasket
10th FIBA Under-18 Women's African Basketball Championship

Tournament details
- Host country: Egypt
- Dates: July 29 – August 6
- Teams: 10
- Venue: 1 (in 1 host city)

Final positions
- Champions: Egypt (1st title)

Tournament statistics
- MVP: (Egypt) Reem Osama
- Top scorer: (Angola) Merciana Fernandes
- Top rebounds: (Egypt) Hagar Mohammed

The 2010 FIBA Africa Under-18 Championship for Women was the 10th FIBA Africa Under-18 Championship for Women, played under the rules of FIBA, the world governing body for basketball, and the FIBA Africa thereof. The tournament was hosted by Egypt and ran from July 29 to August 6.

Egypt defeated Nigeria 63–62 in the final to win their first title, with both teams securing a spot at the 2011 FIBA U18 Women's World Cup.

== Draw ==
Group A	Group B
Angola; Egypt; Kenya; Senegal; Tunisia	DR Congo; Ivory Coast; Mali; Mozambique; Nigeria

== Preliminary round ==
Times given below are in UTC.

=== Group A ===
Qualified for the quarter-finals
Forfeited all points due to age fraud

Team	W	L	PF	PA	Diff	Pts.
Egypt	4	0	317	171	+146	8
Angola	3	1	244	241	+3	7
Senegal	2	2	198	270	-72	6
Tunisia	1	3	215	257	-42	5
Kenya	0	4	233	268	-35	4

July 29

Kenya	40–87	Egypt

Angola	55–48	Tunisia

July 30

Angola	72–74	Kenya

Senegal	31–89	Egypt

July 31

Tunisia	58–64	Kenya

Senegal	50–63	Angola

August 1

Egypt	69–54	Angola

Tunisia	63–66	Senegal

August 2

Egypt	72–46	Tunisia

Kenya	55–51	Senegal

=== Group B ===
Qualified for the quarter-finals

Team	W	L	PF	PA	Diff	Pts.
Nigeria	4	0	277	184	+93	8
Mozambique	3	1	180	157	+23	7
Mali	1	3	246	245	+1	5
Ivory Coast	1	3	133	158	-25	5
DR Congo	1	3	141	183	-42	5

July 29

Nigeria	66–48	Mozambique

August 3

DR Congo	86–81	Mali

July 30

Mali	47–65	Nigeria

August 3

Mozambique	55–42	Ivory Coast

July 31

Mali	49–57	Mozambique

DR Congo	0–20	Ivory Coast

August 1

Mozambique	20–0	DR Congo

Ivory Coast	34–84	Nigeria

August 2

Nigeria	62–55	DR Congo

Ivory Coast	37–69	Mali

== Knockout stage ==
Championship bracket

Quarter-finals
Wed 4 Aug 2010 - 18:00
Ivory Coast	29
Egypt	70
Wed 4 Aug 2010 - 20:00
Senegal	38
Mozambique	51
Wed 4 Aug 2010 - 14:00
Tunisia	44
Nigeria	65
Wed 4 Aug 2010 - 16:00
Mali	51
Angola	50

Semi-finals
Thu 5 Aug 2010 - 18:00
Egypt	80
Mozambique	47
Thu 5 Aug 2010 - 20:00
Nigeria	57
Mali	44

Final
Fri 6 Aug 2010 - 18:00
Egypt	63
Nigeria	62
Third place
Fri 6 Aug 2010 - 16:00
Mozambique	61
Mali	48

5-8th bracket

5–8th classification
Thu 5 Aug 2010 - 14:00
Ivory Coast	53
Senegal	51
Thu 5 Aug 2010 - 16:00
Tunisia	58
Angola	42

5th place
Fri 6 Aug 2010 - 14:00
Ivory Coast	37
Tunisia	62
7th place
Fri 6 Aug 2010 - 10:00
Senegal	45
Angola	53

=== 9th place match ===
August 4
12:00

DR Congo	57–50	Kenya

=== Quarter-finals ===
August 4
14:00

Tunisia	44–65	Nigeria

16:00

Mali	51–50	Angola

18:00

Ivory Coast	29–70	Egypt

20:00

Senegal	38–51	Mozambique

=== 5-8th classification ===
August 5
14:00

Ivory Coast	53–51	Senegal

16:00

Tunisia	58–42	Angola

=== Semi-finals ===
August 5
18:00

Egypt	80–47	Mozambique

20:00

Nigeria	57–44	Mali

=== 7th place match ===
August 6
10:00

Senegal	45–53	Angola

=== 5th place match ===
August 6
14:00

Ivory Coast	37–62	Tunisia

=== Bronze medal match ===
August 6
16:00

Mozambique	61–48	Mali

=== Final ===
August 6
18:00

Egypt	63–62	Nigeria

== Final standings ==
Qualified for the 2011 FIBA U18 Women's World Cup

Rank	Team	Record
Gold medal	Egypt	7–0
Silver medal	Nigeria	6–1
Bronze medal	Mozambique	5–2
4	Mali	2–5
5	Tunisia	3–3
6	Ivory Coast	2–4
7	Angola	4–2
8	Senegal	2–4
9	DR Congo	2–3
10	Kenya	0–5

== Awards ==
2010 FIBA Africa Under-18 Championship for Women winners

Egypt
First title

Most Valuable Player
(Egypt) Reem Osama

== See also ==
- 2011 FIBA Africa Championship for Women
