= Kenya women's national under-18 basketball team =

Kenya
- FIBA zone: FIBA Africa
- National federation: Kenya Basketball Association

U19 World Cup
- Appearances: None

U18 AfroBasket
- Appearances: 3
- Medals: None
Home	Away

The Kenya women's national under-18 basketball team is a national basketball team of Kenya, administered by the Kenya Basketball Association. It represents the country in international under-18 women's basketball competitions.

== FIBA U18 Women's AfroBasket participations ==
Year	Result
2008	7th
2010	10th
2012	6th
2026	8th

== See also ==
- Kenya women's national basketball team
- Kenya men's national under-18 basketball team
