= Cameroon women's national under-18 basketball team =

Basketball team representing Cameroon

Cameroon
- FIBA zone: FIBA Africa
- National federation: Fédération Camerounaise de Basketball

U19 World Cup
- Appearances: None

U18 AfroBasket
- Appearances: 1
- Medals: (bronze) Bronze: 1 (2024)

The Cameroon women's national under-18 basketball team is a national basketball team of Cameroon, administered by the Fédération Camerounaise de Basketball. It represents the country in international under-18 women's basketball competitions.

The team qualified for the FIBA U18 Women's AfroBasket for the first time in 2024 and immediately won the bronze medal there.

== See also ==
- Cameroon women's national basketball team
- Cameroon men's national under-18 basketball team
