= Benin women's national under-18 basketball team =

Benin
- FIBA zone: FIBA Africa
- National federation: Fédération Béninoise de Basketball

U19 World Cup
- Appearances: None

U18 AfroBasket
- Appearances: 2 (2006, 2008)
- Medals: None

The Benin women's national under-18 basketball team is a national basketball team of Benin, administered by the Fédération Béninoise de Basketball. It represents the country in international under-18 women's basketball competitions.

== FIBA U18 Women's AfroBasket participations ==
Year	Result
2006	4th
2008	8th
2026	11th

== See also ==
- Benin men's national under-18 basketball team
