= Angola women's national under-18 and under-19 basketball team =

Angola
- Joined FIBA: 1979
- FIBA zone: FIBA Africa
- National federation: FAB Portuguese: Federação Angolana de Basquetebol
- Coach: Aníbal Moreira

U19 World Cup
- Appearances: None

U18 AfroBasket
- Appearances: 15
- Medals: (gold) Gold: 1 (1998); (silver) Silver: 1 (1988); (bronze) Bronze: 5 (1985, 1991, 2000, 2018, 2022)
Home	Away

The Angola women's national under-18 basketball team is a national basketball team of Angola, administered by the Federação Angolana de Basquetebol. It represents the country in international under-18 women's basketball competitions.

== FIBA U18 Women's AfroBasket participations ==
Year	Result
1985	3rd place, bronze medalist(s)
1988	2nd place, silver medalist(s)
1991	3rd place, bronze medalist(s)
1996	DNP
1999	1st place, gold medalist(s)
2000	3rd place, bronze medalist(s)
2004	4th
2006	5th
2008	10th

Year	Result
2010	7th
2012	5th
2014	5th
2016	4th
2018	3rd place, bronze medalist(s)
2020	DNP
2022	3rd place, bronze medalist(s)
2024	6th

== Current roster ==
Angola Women's U-18 Basketball Team - 2018 FIBA Africa Championship - roster
Players
Coaches

Pos.	No.	Name	Age – Date of birth	Height	Club
	4	Marioneth Silva	18 – 10 July 2000		Interclube
	5	Tatiana Miguel	17 – 4 October 2000		Formigas do Cazenga
PG	6	Cristina Lourenço	17 – 1 May 2001	1.70 m (5 ft 7 in)	Primeiro de Agosto
C	7	Helena Pululo	17 – 19 April 2001	1.80 m (5 ft 11 in)	Interclube
	8	Isabel Fernando	18 – 5 June 2000		Primeiro de Agosto
SG	9	Alexia Dizeko	17 – 12 March 2001	1.82 m (6 ft 0 in)	Hélios Basket
	11	Maria Macedo	18 – 17 July 2000		Benfica do Montijo
	12	Magda Mussol	17 – 18 December 2000		Formigas do Cazenga
	13	Antónia Miguel	18 – 20 May 2000		Interclube
	14	Antonieta Vidal (C)	18 – 2 March 2000		Primeiro de Agosto
G	15	Júlia Francisco	17 – 25 January 2001	1.70 m (5 ft 7 in)	Primeiro de Agosto
	18	Maria Boavida	17 – 29 August 2000

Head coach

- Aníbal Moreira

Assistant coach(es)

- Fernando Figueiredo
- Elisa Pires

Legend

- (C) Team captain
- nat field describes country

== Head coach positions ==
- Aníbal Moreira 2018
- Apolinário Paquete 2017
- Elisa Pires 2016
- Jaime Covilhã 2014
- Fernando Sapalo 2012
- Apolinário Paquete 2000

== Players ==
Angola women's u18 and u19 basketball players

=== 2012–2018 ===
A = African championship

#	Name	A	P	H	C	F.S.	J.C.	E.P.	A.M.
#	Name	A	P	H	C	2012	2014	2016	2018
#	Name	A	P	H	C	A	A	A	A
⋅	Adalberta Candeias	18	PF	1.79	PRI	⋅	⋅	14	⋅
9	Alexia Dizeko	17	SG	1.82	HEL	⋅	⋅	⋅	2018
13	Antónia Miguel	18	⋅	1.80	INT	⋅	⋅	⋅	2018
14	Antonieta Vidal	18	⋅	⋅	PRI	⋅	⋅	⋅	2018
⋅	Avelina Peso	18	PF	1.84	PRI	⋅	⋅	11	⋅
⋅	Breone Caculo	16	SG	1.67	SCB	⋅	⋅	9	⋅
⋅	Canata Miguel	17	C	1.85	BLU	⋅	⋅	15	⋅
⋅	Cristina Correia	17	⋅	⋅	PRI	⋅	13	⋅	⋅
6	Cristina Lourenço	17	PG	1.70	PRI	⋅	⋅	⋅	2018
⋅	Dalsana Kuto	17	⋅	⋅	IBE	4	⋅	⋅	⋅
⋅	Eduarda Gabriel	17	⋅	⋅	INT	⋅	10	⋅	⋅
⋅	Edvânia Pascoal	17	SF	1.72	INT	⋅	⋅	10	⋅
⋅	Elsa Doneth	18	⋅	⋅	MAC	5	⋅	⋅	⋅
⋅	Emanuela Mateus	17	⋅	⋅	MAC	⋅	9	⋅	⋅
⋅	Erica Guilherme	18	⋅	⋅	INT	⋅	4	⋅	⋅
⋅	Esperança Nunda	18	⋅	⋅	SCB	⋅	11	⋅	⋅
⋅	Feliciana Zuluca	17	⋅	⋅	MAC	13	⋅	⋅	⋅
⋅	Francisca Mateus	17	⋅	⋅	INT	12	⋅	⋅	⋅
7	Helena Pululo	17	⋅	1.80	INT	⋅	⋅	⋅	2018
⋅	Helena Viegas	17	⋅	⋅	JUV	8	⋅	⋅	⋅
⋅	Irene Cafumo	16	PG	1.53	INT	⋅	⋅	4	⋅
8	Isabel Fernando	18	⋅	⋅	PRI	⋅	⋅	⋅	2018
⋅	Joana António	17	⋅	⋅	INT	⋅	14	⋅	⋅
⋅	Joana Bendi	19	⋅	⋅	PRI	⋅	7	⋅	⋅
⋅	Juda Quindanda	18	PF	1.76	PRI	⋅	⋅	13	⋅
15	Júlia Francisco	17	⋅	1.70	PRI	⋅	⋅	⋅	2018
⋅	Leopoldina Emídio	17	⋅	⋅	LUS	⋅	15	⋅	⋅
⋅	Luyana Filipe	17	⋅	⋅	PRI	6	⋅	⋅	⋅
⋅	Madalena Silva	18	⋅	⋅	SCB	⋅	6	⋅	⋅
12	Magda Mussol	17	⋅	⋅	FOR	⋅	⋅	⋅	2018
18	Maria Boavida	17	⋅	⋅	⋅	⋅	⋅	⋅	2018
⋅	Maria Fula	18	⋅	⋅	SCC	7	⋅	⋅	⋅
11	Maria Macedo	18	⋅	⋅	BEN	⋅	⋅	⋅	2018
⋅	Mariana Manuel	17	⋅	⋅	IBE	⋅	12	⋅	⋅
4	Marioneth Silva	18	⋅	⋅	INT	⋅	⋅	⋅	2018
⋅	Nelma Avelino	18	SG	1.72	MAC	⋅	⋅	12	⋅
⋅	Neusa Cândido	18	PG	1.60	INT	⋅	⋅	6	⋅
⋅	Nicoleth Senguele	18	⋅	⋅	PRI	14	⋅	⋅	⋅
⋅	Regina Pequeno	17	SF	1.70	IBE	⋅	⋅	8	⋅
⋅	Rosa Gala	17	⋅	⋅	PRI	10	⋅	⋅	⋅
⋅	Ruth Paím	18	⋅	⋅	MAC	⋅	5	⋅	⋅
⋅	Senia Cazua	17	⋅	⋅	INT	10	⋅	⋅	⋅
⋅	Tatiana Jamba	18	⋅	⋅	BLU	⋅	8	⋅	⋅
5	Tatiana Miguel	17	⋅	⋅	FOR	⋅	⋅	⋅	2018
⋅	Teresa Sacato	18	PG	1.60	BLU	⋅	⋅	5	⋅
⋅	Valeriana Moxi	17	SG	1.70	INT	⋅	⋅	7	⋅
⋅	Vania Vicente	17	⋅	⋅	SCC	9	⋅	⋅	⋅
⋅	Victória Cruz	18	⋅	⋅	PRI	15	⋅	⋅	⋅

=== 2002–2010 ===
AC = African championship; WC = World cup

Name	A	P	H	C	–	–	H.G.	A.P.	H.L.
Name	A	P	H	C	2000	2004	2006	2008	2010
Name	A	P	H	C	A	A	A	A	A
Ana Gonçalves	17	⋅	⋅	IBE	⋅	⋅	⋅	10	2010
Analzira Américo	17	⋅	⋅	PRI	⋅	⋅	⋅	⋅	2010
Angelina Golome	18	⋅	⋅		⋅	14	14	⋅	⋅
Catarina Eusébio	18	⋅	⋅		⋅	5	5	⋅	⋅
Cláudia António	18	⋅	⋅		⋅	15	⋅	⋅	⋅
Cláudia Dundão	18	⋅	⋅		⋅	⋅	12	14	⋅
Conceição Estevão	18	⋅	⋅		⋅	⋅	⋅	8	⋅
Cristina Matiquite	18	⋅	⋅	PRI	⋅	⋅	⋅	13	2010
Elisabete Pascoal	18	⋅	⋅		⋅	⋅	⋅	7	⋅
Elizabeth Mateus	17	⋅	⋅		⋅	⋅	⋅	⋅	2010
Elsa Eduardo	17	⋅	⋅		⋅	⋅	6	⋅	⋅
Esperança António	18	⋅	⋅		⋅	⋅	8	⋅	⋅
Eugénia Bento	18	⋅	⋅		⋅	⋅	7	⋅	⋅
Eva Silva	18	⋅	⋅		⋅	4	⋅	⋅	⋅
Felícia Silva	18	⋅	⋅		⋅	⋅	10	⋅	⋅
Fineza Eusébio	18	⋅	⋅	PRI	⋅	⋅	4	4	⋅
Flora Bernardo	18	⋅	⋅		⋅	⋅	⋅	12	⋅
Guiomar Mizalaque	17	⋅	⋅		⋅	13	⋅	⋅	⋅
Helena Francisco	17	⋅	⋅		⋅	⋅	⋅	⋅	2010
Javete Lusilanovo	17	⋅	⋅		⋅	⋅	⋅	11	⋅
Joana Baptista	18	⋅	⋅		⋅	⋅	9	⋅	⋅
Lizeth Ndombele	17	⋅	⋅		⋅	⋅	⋅	⋅	2010
Luyana Filipe	16	⋅	⋅	PRI	⋅	⋅	⋅	⋅	2010
Luzia Simão	18	⋅	⋅		⋅	⋅	⋅	⋅	2010
Madalena Felix	17	⋅	⋅		⋅	⋅	15	⋅	⋅
Madalena Valentim	17	⋅	⋅		⋅	⋅	⋅	⋅	2010
Maria Manuel	17	⋅	⋅		⋅	⋅	⋅	⋅	2010
Marilia Pascoal	17	⋅	⋅		⋅	⋅	⋅	5	⋅
Marisa Nsiame	18	⋅	⋅		⋅	8	⋅	⋅	⋅
Marta Perestrelo	18	⋅	⋅		⋅	7	⋅	⋅	⋅
Merciana Fernandes	18	⋅	⋅	MAC	⋅	⋅	⋅	9	2010
Mireille Matondo	18	⋅	⋅	INT	⋅	⋅	⋅	15	2010
Nadir Manuel	18	⋅	⋅		⋅	11	⋅	⋅	⋅
Quilosa de Carvalho	18	⋅	⋅		⋅	⋅	13	⋅	⋅
Rosária Queta	16	⋅	⋅		⋅	⋅	⋅	6	⋅
Samba Eduardo	17	⋅	⋅		⋅	9	⋅	⋅	⋅
Solange Bumba	18	⋅	⋅		⋅	10	⋅	⋅	⋅
Vera João	18	⋅	⋅		⋅	6	⋅	⋅	⋅
Vera Miguel	18	⋅	⋅		⋅	12	⋅	⋅	⋅

== See also ==
- Angola women's national basketball team
- Angola women's national under-20 basketball team
- Angola women's national under-16 and under-17 basketball team
- Angola men's national under-18 and under-19 basketball team
