= Senegal women's national under-19 basketball team =

Senegal
- FIBA zone: FIBA Africa
- National federation: Fédération Sénégalaise de Basket-Ball

U19 World Cup
- Appearances: 2
- Medals: None

U18 AfroBasket
- Appearances: 6
- Medals: (gold) Gold: 2 (1985, 2012); (silver) Silver: 2 (1991, 1999); (bronze) Bronze: 1 (2020)
Home	Away

The Senegal women's national under-18 and under-19 basketball team is a national basketball team of Senegal, administered by the Fédération Sénégalaise de Basket-Ball. It represents the country in international under-18 and under-19 women's basketball competitions.

== FIBA U18 Women's AfroBasket participations ==
Year	Result
1985	1st place, gold medalist(s)
1991	2nd place, silver medalist(s)
1999	2nd place, silver medalist(s)
2010	8th
2012	1st place, gold medalist(s)
2020	3rd place, bronze medalist(s)
2026	9th

== FIBA Under-19 Women's Basketball World Cup participations ==
Year	Result
1985	10th
2013	16th

== See also ==
- Senegal women's national basketball team
- Senegal women's national under-17 basketball team
- Senegal men's national under-19 basketball team
