= Uganda women's national under-18 basketball team =

National basketball team of Uganda

Uganda
- FIBA zone: FIBA Africa
- National federation: Federation of Uganda Basketball Association

U19 World Cup
- Appearances: None

U18 AfroBasket
- Appearances: 5
- Medals: None

The Uganda women's national under-18 basketball team is a national basketball team of Uganda, administered by the Federation of Uganda Basketball Association. It represents the country in international under-18 women's basketball competitions.

== FIBA U18 Women's AfroBasket participations ==
Year	Result
2008	11th
2016	8th
2018	8th
2022	5th
2024	4th
2026	6th

== See also ==
- Uganda women's national basketball team
- Uganda women's national under-16 basketball team
- Uganda men's national under-18 basketball team
