= Guinea women's national under-18 basketball team =

Guinea
- FIBA zone: FIBA Africa
- National federation: Fédération Guinéenne de Basket-Ball

U19 World Cup
- Appearances: None

U18 AfroBasket
- Appearances: 2
- Medals: None

The Guinea women's national under-18 basketball team is a national basketball team of Guinea, administered by the Guinean Basketball Federation. It represents the country in international under-18 women's basketball competitions.

== FIBA U18 Women's AfroBasket participations ==
Year	Result
2008	6th
2022	8th

== See also ==
- Guinea women's national basketball team
- Guinea women's national under-16 basketball team
- Guinea men's national under-18 basketball team
