= Mozambique women's national under-19 basketball team =

Mozambique
- FIBA zone: FIBA Africa
- National federation: Federação Moçambicana de Basquetebol

U19 World Cup
- Appearances: 1 (2019)
- Medals: None

U18 AfroBasket
- Appearances: 8
- Medals: (silver) Silver: 3 (1985, 1996, 2018); (bronze) Bronze: 5 (2004, 2008, 2010, 2014, 2016)

The Mozambique women's national under-18 and under-19 basketball team is a national basketball team of Mozambique, administered by the Federação Moçambicana de Basquetebol. It represents the country in international under-18 and under-19 women's basketball competitions.

== FIBA U18 Women's AfroBasket participations ==
Year	Result
1985	2nd place, silver medalist(s)
1996	2nd place, silver medalist(s)
2004	3rd place, bronze medalist(s)
2008	3rd place, bronze medalist(s)
2010	3rd place, bronze medalist(s)
2014	3rd place, bronze medalist(s)
2016	3rd place, bronze medalist(s)
2018	2nd place, silver medalist(s)

== FIBA Under-19 Women's Basketball World Cup participations ==
Year	Result
2019	15th

== See also ==
- Mozambique women's national basketball team
- Mozambique women's national under-16 basketball team
- Mozambique men's national under-18 basketball team
