= Ezzahra =

Ezzahra الزهراء
- Commune and town
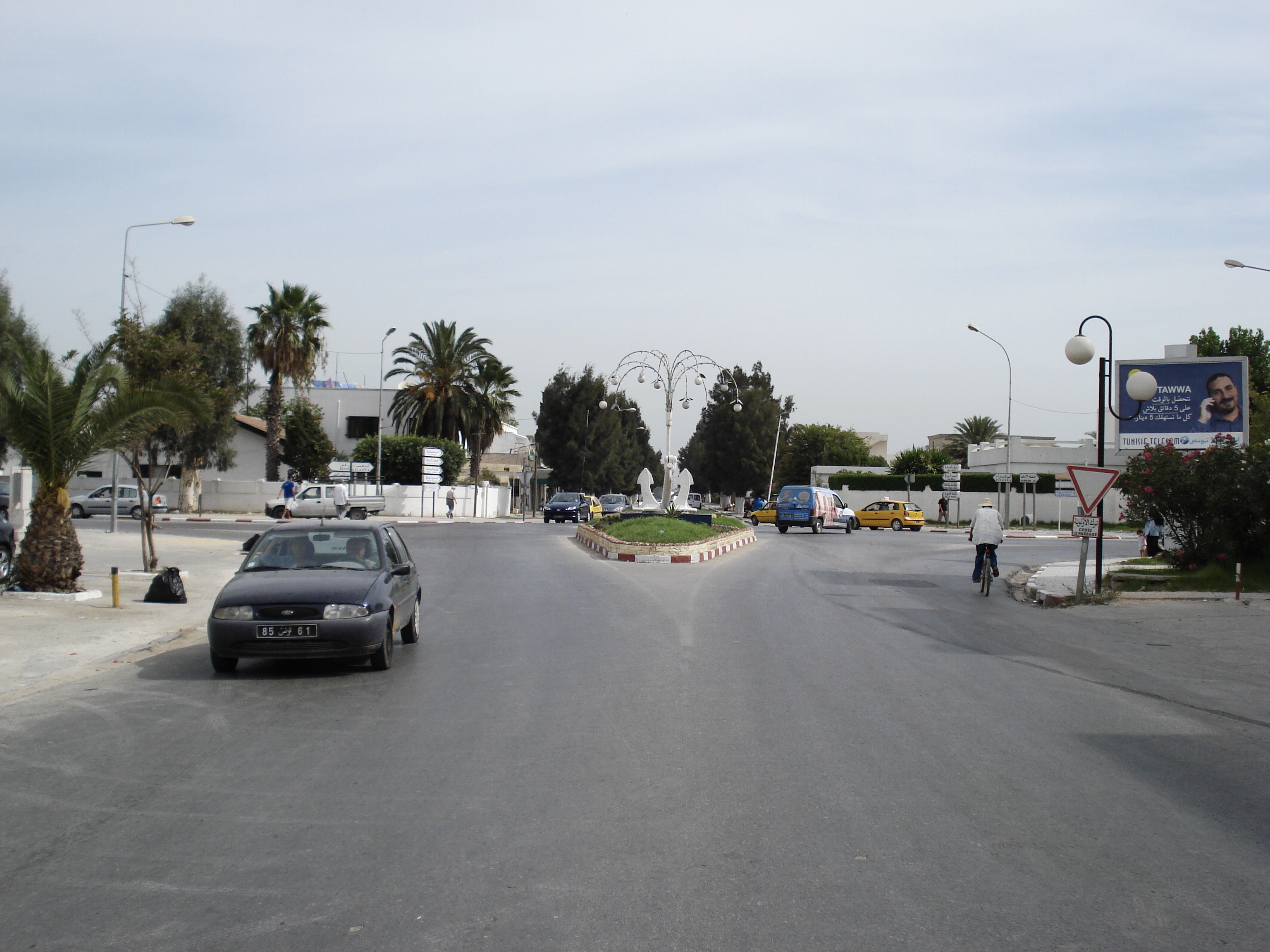

- Location within Tunisia
- Coordinates: 36°44′38″N 10°18′30″E
- Country: Tunisia
- Governorate: Ben Arous Governorate

Government
  - Mayor: Mohamed Rayen Hamzaoui

Population (2022)
  - Total: 36,298
- Time zone: UTC+1 (CET)
- Postal code: 2034
- Website: www.commune-ezzahra.gov.tn

Ezzahra (Arabic: الزهراء) is a coastal city on the outskirts of Tunis located south of the capital. Ezzahra is bounded by the Mediterranean Sea and the municipalities of Rades, Hammam Lif and Boumhel EL-Bassatine. Administratively attached to the governorate of Ben Arous, it is the seat of a delegation and a municipality of 31,792 inhabitants (in 2014) while the city itself has a population of 6000 inhabitants. The municipality of Ezzahra consists of four cities: Ezzahra, El Habib, 18 January and Borj El-Louzir.

== History ==
The municipality was founded on September 10, 1909, during the colonial period, under the name of Saint-Germain and was subsequently renamed Ezzahra after the independence of Tunisia in honor of national fighter Lazhar Chraïti (1919-1963).

== Culture ==
Ezzahra organizes a theater festival each summer. It also has a basketball club (Ezzahra Sports) among the best in Tunisia and there also is two of the oldest elementary schools and high schools in Tunisia: Al Jomhouriya Avenue Elementary School and Ibn Rachik High School.

Ezzahra is also the birthplace of the Tunisian progressive metal band Myrath.

== See also ==
- List of cities in Tunisia
