= Ivory Coast women's national under-19 basketball team =

Ivory Coast
- FIBA zone: FIBA Africa
- National federation: Fédération Ivoirienne de Basket-Ball

U19 World Cup
- Appearances: 1 (2007)
- Medals: None

U18 AfroBasket
- Appearances: 5
- Medals: (silver) Silver: 2 (2000, 2006)
Home	Away

The Ivory Coast women's national under-18 and under-19 basketball team is a national basketball team of the Ivory Coast, administered by the Fédération Ivoirienne de Basket-Ball. It represents the country in international women's under-18 and under-19 basketball competitions.

== FIBA U18 Women's AfroBasket participations ==
Year	Result
2000	2nd place, silver medalist(s)
2006	2nd place, silver medalist(s)
2008	5th
2010	6th
2014	7th
2026	4th

== FIBA Under-19 Women's Basketball World Cup participations ==
Year	Result
2007	16th

== See also ==
- Ivory Coast women's national basketball team
- Ivory Coast women's national under-16 basketball team
- Ivory Coast men's national under-19 basketball team
