= Ndeye Dieng =

Senegalese basketball player (born 1994)

DUC Dakar
- Position: Guard
- League: SDI

Personal information
- Born: 1 December 1994 (age 31) Dakar, Senegal
- Listed height: 5 ft 10 in (1.78 m)

Career information
- College: Auburn (2013–17)
- WNBA draft: 2017: undrafted

Ndeye Khadidiatou Dieng (born 1 December 1994) is a Senegalese basketball player for DUC Dakar and the Senegalese national team.

She participated at the 2018 FIBA Women's Basketball World Cup.
