= Nigeria women's national under-19 basketball team =

Nigeria
- FIBA zone: FIBA Africa
- National federation: Nigeria Basketball Federation

U19 World Cup
- Appearances: 3

U18 AfroBasket
- Appearances: 3
- Medals: (silver) Silver: 2 (2010, 2024)

The Nigeria women's national under-18 and under-19 basketball team is a national basketball team of Nigeria, administered by the Nigeria Basketball Federation. It represents the country in international under-18 and under-19 women's basketball competitions.

== Results ==
=== FIBA Under-19 Women's Basketball World Cup ===
Year	Result
2011	16th
2025	12th
2027	Qualified

=== FIBA U18 Women's AfroBasket ===
Year	Result
2008	4th
2010	2nd place, silver medalist(s)
2024	2nd place, silver medalist(s)
2026	2nd place, silver medalist(s)

== See also ==
- Nigeria women's national basketball team
- Nigeria women's national under-17 basketball team
- Nigeria men's national under-19 basketball team
