= Tunisia women's national under-19 basketball team =

Tunisia
- Joined FIBA: 1956
- FIBA zone: FIBA Africa
- National federation: Tunisia Basketball Federation
- Nickname(s): نسور قرطاج (Eagles of Carthage)

U19 World Cup
- Appearances: 2
- Medals: None

U18 AfroBasket
- Appearances: 7
- Medals: (gold) Gold: 1 (2004); (silver) Silver: 1 (2008)
Home	Away
Medal record
Event	1st	2nd	3rd
FIBA U18 Women's AfroBasket	1	1	0
Total	1	1	0

The Tunisia women's national under-18 and under-19 basketball team (Arabic: منتخب تونس تحت 19 سنة لكرة السلة للسيدات), nicknamed Les Aigles de Carthage (The Eagles of Carthage or The Carthage Eagles), is a national basketball team of Tunisia, administered by the Tunisia Basketball Federation (FTBB). (Arabic: الجامعة التونسية لكرة السلة) It represents the country in international under-18 and under-19 (under age 18 and under age 19) women's basketball competitions.

== Competitive record ==
Champions Runners-up Third place Fourth place

- Red border color indicates tournament was held on home soil.

=== FIBA Under-19 Women's Basketball World Cup ===
FIBA Under-19 Women's Basketball World Cup
Appearances: 2
Year	Position	Host
(United States) 1985	Did not qualify	Colorado Springs, United States
(Spain) 1989	Did not qualify	Bilbao, Spain
(South Korea) 1993	Did not qualify	Seoul, South Korea
(Brazil) 1997	Did not qualify	Natal, Brazil
(Czech Republic) 2001	Did not qualify	Brno, Czech Republic
(Tunisia) 2005	12th	Nabeul / Tunis, Tunisia
(Slovakia) 2007	Did not qualify	Bratislava, Slovakia
(Thailand) 2009	15th	Bangkok, Thailand
(Chile) 2011	Did not qualify	Puerto Montt / Puerto Varas, Chile
(Lithuania) 2013	Did not qualify	Klaipėda / Panevėžys, Lithuania
(Russia) 2015	Did not qualify	Chekhov / Vidnoye, Russia
(Italy) 2017	Did not qualify	Udine / Cividale del Friuli, Italy
(Thailand) 2019	Did not qualify	Bangkok, Thailand
(Hungary) 2021	Did not qualify	Debrecen, Hungary
(Spain) 2023	Did not qualify	Madrid, Spain
(Czech Republic) 2025	Did not qualify	Brno, Czech Republic
(China) 2027	Did not qualify	Chengdu, China

=== FIBA U18 Women's AfroBasket ===
FIBA U18 Women's AfroBasket
Appearances: 7
Year	Position	Host
(Ghana) 1985	Did not participate	Accra, Ghana
(Angola) 1988	Did not participate	Luanda, Angola
(Senegal) 1991	Did not participate	Dakar, Senegal
(Mozambique) 1996	Did not participate	Maputo, Mozambique
(Senegal) 1998	Did not participate	Dakar, Senegal
(Mali) 2000	Did not participate	Bamako, Mali
(Tunisia) 2004	Champions (gold)	Ben Arous, Tunisia
(Benin) 2006	Did not participate	Cotonou, Benin
(Tunisia) 2008	2nd (silver)	Radès, Tunisia
(Egypt) 2010	5th	Cairo, Egypt
(Senegal) 2012	4th	Dakar, Senegal
(Egypt) 2014	6th	Cairo, Egypt
(Egypt) 2016	6th	Cairo, Egypt
(Mozambique) 2018	Did not participate	Maputo, Mozambique
(Egypt) 2020	Did not participate	Cairo, Egypt
(Madagascar) 2022	Did not participate	Antsirabe, Madagascar
(South Africa) 2024	8th	Pretoria, South Africa

== See also ==
- Tunisia women's national basketball team
- Tunisia women's national under-20 basketball team
- Tunisia women's national under-17 basketball team
- Tunisia men's national under-19 basketball team
