= DR Congo women's national under-19 basketball team =

Democratic Republic of the Congo
- FIBA zone: FIBA Africa
- National federation: Basketball Federation of Democratic Republic of Congo

U19 World Cup
- Appearances: 3
- Medals: None

U18 AfroBasket
- Appearances: 7
- Medals: (gold) Gold: 2 (1988, 1991); (silver) Silver: 1 (2004); (bronze) Bronze: 1 (2006)
| Home | Away |

The DR Congo women's national under-18 and under-19 basketball team (French: Équipe nationale féminine des moins de 18 ans et des moins de 19 ans de la République démocratique du Congo) is a national basketball team of the Democratic Republic of the Congo, administered by the Basketball Federation of Democratic Republic of Congo. It represents the country in international under-18 and under-19 women's basketball competitions.

The team was formerly known as the Zaire women's national under-18 and under-19 basketball team (French: Équipe nationale féminine de basket-ball des moins de 18 et 19 ans du Zaïre).

== FIBA U18 Women's AfroBasket participations ==
| Year | Result |
|---|---|
| 1988 | 1st place, gold medalist(s) |
| 1991 | 1st place, gold medalist(s) |
| 2004 | 2nd place, silver medalist(s) |
| 2006 | 3rd place, bronze medalist(s) |
| 2008 | 9th |
| 2010 | 9th |
| 2018 | 7th |

== FIBA Under-19 Women's Basketball World Cup participations ==
| Year | Result |
|---|---|
| 1989 | 12th |
| 1993 | 10th |
| 2005 | 11th |

== See also ==
- DR Congo women's national basketball team
- DR Congo men's national under-18 basketball team
