= Mali women's national under-19 basketball team =

Mali
- FIBA zone: FIBA Africa
- National federation: Fédération Malienne de Basketball

U19 World Cup
- Appearances: 12

U18 AfroBasket
- Appearances: 14
- Medals: (gold) Gold: 9 (1996, 2000, 2006, 2008, 2014, 2016, 2018, 2022, 2024); (silver) Silver: 2 (2012, 2020)

The Mali women's national under-18 and under-19 basketball team is a national basketball team of Mali, administered by the Fédération Malienne de Basketball. It represents the country in international under-18 and under-19 women's basketball competitions.

== Results ==
=== FIBA Under-19 Women's Basketball World Cup ===
Year	Result
1997	10th
2001	12th
2007	15th
2009	14th
2013	15th
2015	12th
2017	13th
2019	7th
2021	4th
2023	5th
2025	DQ
2027	Qualified

=== FIBA U18 Women's AfroBasket ===
Year	Result
1996	1st place, gold medalist(s)
1999	4th
2000	1st place, gold medalist(s)
2004	6th
2006	1st place, gold medalist(s)
2008	1st place, gold medalist(s)
2010	4th

Year	Result
2012	2nd place, silver medalist(s)
2014	1st place, gold medalist(s)
2016	1st place, gold medalist(s)
2018	1st place, gold medalist(s)
2020	2nd place, silver medalist(s)
2022	1st place, gold medalist(s)
2024	1st place, gold medalist(s)
2026	1st place, gold medalist(s)

== See also ==
- Mali women's national basketball team
- Mali women's national under-17 basketball team
- Mali men's national under-19 basketball team
