= Yacine Diop =

Senegalese basketball player

No. 24 – Louisville Cardinals
- Position: Forward
- League: ACC

Personal information
- Born: 18 June 1995 (age 31) Dakar, Senegal
- Listed height: 1.78 m (5 ft 10 in)

Career information
- College: Pittsburgh (2014–2018); Louisville (2018–2020)
- WNBA draft: 2019: undrafted

Yacine Diop (born 18 June 1995) is a Senegalese basketball player for Louisville and the Senegalese national team.

She participated at the 2018 FIBA Women's Basketball World Cup.

== Pittsburgh and Louisville statistics ==
Legend
GP	Games played	GS	Games started	MPG	Minutes per game
FG%	Field goal percentage	3P%	3-point field goal percentage	FT%	Free throw percentage
RPG	Rebounds per game	APG	Assists per game	SPG	Steals per game
BPG	Blocks per game	PPG	Points per game	**Bold**	Career high

Year	Team	GP	Points	FG%	3P%	FT%	RPG	APG	SPG	BPG	PPG
2014-15	Pittsburgh	**32**	300	46.6%	20.0%	56.8%	**7.2**	1.8	1.0	0.5	9.4
2015-16	Pittsburgh	31	323	45.0%	25.8%	63.6%	5.2	1.7	1.2	0.3	10.4
2016-17	Pittsburgh	Medical redshirt									
2017-18	Pittsburgh	30	**470**	42.6%	31.6%	72.2%	6.4	**2.4**	**1.4**	**1.2**	**15.7**
2018-19	Louisville	4	25	44.0%	0.0%	**75.0%**	4.3	1.0	0.8	0.3	6.3
2019-20	Louisville	**32**	221	**48.7%**	**40.5%**	73.3%	3.5	1.3	1.0	0.2	6.9
Career		129	1339	45.1%	30.5%	67.6%	5.5	1.8	1.1	0.5	10.4
