= Mariama Touré =

Guinean swimmer

Personal information
- Born: November 10, 2003 (age 22)

Sport
- Sport: Swimming
- Strokes: Breaststroke

Mariama Touré (born 10 November 2003) is a Guinean swimmer. She competed in the women's 100 metre breaststroke at the 2020 Summer Olympics.
