= 2027 FIBA Under-19 Women's Basketball World Cup =

2027 FIBA Under-19 Basketball World Cup
2027年国际篮联U19女篮世界杯

Tournament details
- Host country: China
- City: Chengdu
- Dates: 17–25 July
- Teams: 16 (from 5 confederations)
- Venue: (in 1 host city)

Official website
- FIBA

The 2027 FIBA Under-19 Basketball World Cup will be the 17th edition of the FIBA Under-19 Women's Basketball World Cup, the biennial international women's basketball championship contested by the U19 national teams of the member associations of FIBA. The tournament will be held in Chengdu, China, from 17 to 25 July 2027. This will mark the first time China has ever hosted this event.

== Qualified teams ==
| Means of qualification | Dates | Venue | Berth(s) | Qualifier(s) |
|---|---|---|---|---|
| Host nation | —N/a | —N/a | 1 | China |
| 2026 FIBA U18 Women's AmeriCup | 9–15 June 2026 | (Mexico) Irapuato | 4 | Argentina; Canada; United States; Venezuela |
| 2026 FIBA U18 Women's EuroBasket | 1–9 August 2026 | (Sweden) Stockholm | 5 | Belgium; Finland; France; Serbia; Spain |
| 2026 FIBA U18 Women's AfroBasket | 2–16 August 2026 | (Ivory Coast) Abidjan | 2 | Mali; Nigeria |
| 2026 FIBA U18 Women's Asia Cup | 4–10 October 2026 | (Malaysia) Seremban | 4 | Australia; Chinese Taipei; Japan; South Korea |
| Total | | | 16 | |

=== Summary of qualified teams ===
| Team | Qualification method | Date of qualification | Appearance(s) | | | | Previous best performance (Note: Bold text indicates they hosted that edition.) | WR (Note: World ranking at start of tournament.) |
| Team | Qualification method | Date of qualification | Total | First | Last | Streak | Previous best performance | WR |
|---|---|---|---|---|---|---|---|---|
| China | Host nation | 19 October 2025 | 16th | 1985 | 2025 | 3 | Third place (2005) | TBD |
| Canada | Top four at 2026 FIBA U18 Women's AmeriCup | 12 June 2026 | 13th | 1985 | 2025 | 11 | Third place (2017, 2023) | TBD |
| United States | Top four at 2026 FIBA U18 Women's AmeriCup | 12 June 2026 | 17th | 1985 | 2025 | 17 | Champions (1997, 2005, 2007, 2009, 2011, 2013, 2015, 2019, 2021, 2023, 2025) | TBD |
| Argentina | Top four at 2026 FIBA U18 Women's AmeriCup | 13 June 2026 | 11th | 1997 | 2025 | 4 | Third place (2009) | TBD |
| Venezuela | Top four at 2026 FIBA U18 Women's AmeriCup | 13 June 2026 | 1st | None | | 1 | Debut | TBD |
| Spain | Top five at 2026 FIBA U18 Women's EuroBasket | 6 August 2026 | 15th | 1985 | 2025 | 12 | Runners-up (2009, 2011, 2023) | TBD |
| Finland | Top five at 2026 FIBA U18 Women's EuroBasket | 6 August 2026 | 1st | None | | 1 | Debut | TBD |
| France | Top five at 2026 FIBA U18 Women's EuroBasket | 6 August 2026 | 11th | 1997 | 2025 | 4 | Runners-up (2013) | TBD |
| Serbia | Top five at 2026 FIBA U18 Women's EuroBasket | 6 August 2026 | 11th | 2007 | 2015 | 4 | Third place (2007) | TBD |
| Belgium | Top five at 2026 FIBA U18 Women's EuroBasket | 9 August 2026 | 3rd | 2015 | 2019 | 1 | Fourth place (2015, 2019) | TBD |
| Mali | Top two at 2026 FIBA U18 Women's AfroBasket | 14 August 2026 | 11th | 1997 | 2023 | 1 | Fourth place (2021) | TBD |
| Nigeria | Top two at 2026 FIBA U18 Women's AfroBasket | 14 August 2026 | 3rd | 2011 | 2025 | 2 | Twelfth place (2025) | TBD |
| Australia | Top four at 2026 FIBA U18 Women's Asia Cup | 6 October 2026 | 17th | 1985 | 2025 | 17 | Champions (1993) | TBD |
| Japan | Top four at 2026 FIBA U18 Women's Asia Cup | 6 October 2026 | 13th | 1993 | 2025 | 6 | Fourth place (2017) | TBD |
| South Korea | Top four at 2026 FIBA U18 Women's Asia Cup | 8 October 2026 | 13th | 1985 | 2025 | 2 | Runners-up (1993) | TBD |
| Chinese Taipei | Top four at 2026 FIBA U18 Women's Asia Cup | 9 October 2026 | 6th | 1993 | 2023 | 1 | Eleventh place (2011) | TBD |
