= 2005 FIBA Under-19 World Championship for Women =

2005 FIBA Under-19 Women's Basketball World Cup
Tournament details
- Host country: Tunisia
- Dates: July 15–24
- Teams: 12
- Venue(s): 2 (in 2 host cities)

Final positions
- Champions: United States (2nd title)

Tournament statistics
- MVP: (United States) Crystal Langhorne
- Top scorer: (Australia) Camino (21.6)
- Top rebounds: (Tunisia) M'Nasria (13.2)
- Top assists: (Democratic Republic of the Congo) Lumanu Kalonda (3.7)
- PPG (Team): United States (105.3)
- RPG (Team): United States (44.4)
- APG (Team): United States (23.4)

The 2005 FIBA Under-19 World Championship for Women(Arabic: 2005 بطولة العالم لكرة السلة للسيدات تحت 19 سنة) took place in Tunisia from 15 to 24 July 2005. It was co-organised by the International Basketball Federation (FIBA) and Tunisia Basketball Federation.

Twelve national teams competed for the championship. United States came away with the Gold medal by defeating Serbia & Montenegro 97-76 in the final.

== Venues ==
- Tunis
- Nabeul

== Competing nations ==
Except Tunisia, which automatically qualified as the host nation, the 11 remaining countries qualified through their continents’ qualifying tournaments:

FIBA Africa (2)

- Tunisia (Hosts)
- DR Congo

FIBA Asia (2)

- China
- South Korea

FIBA Americas (3)

- Canada
- Puerto Rico
- United States

FIBA Oceania (1)

- Australia

FIBA Europe (4)

- Spain
- Russia
- Hungary
- Serbia and Montenegro

== Preliminary round ==
All times local : WAT (UTC+1)

=== Group A ===
| Team | Pld | W | L | PF | PA | PD | Pts |
|---|---|---|---|---|---|---|---|
| United States | 5 | 5 | 0 | 561 | 272 | +289 | 10 |
| Russia | 5 | 4 | 1 | 422 | 358 | +64 | 9 |
| South Korea | 5 | 3 | 2 | 419 | 460 | -41 | 8 |
| Serbia and Montenegro | 5 | 2 | 3 | 403 | 402 | +1 | 7 |
| Puerto Rico | 5 | 1 | 4 | 283 | 450 | −67 | 6 |
| DR Congo | 5 | 0 | 5 | 280 | 426 | -146 | 5 |

15 July 2005
10:00

| DR Congo | 51–53 | Puerto Rico |

Tunis

15 July 2005
12:00

| Russia | 65–98 | United States |

Tunis

15 July 2005
14:00

| Serbia and Montenegro | 76–79 | South Korea |

Tunis

16 July 2005
16:30

| United States | 124–37 | DR Congo |

Tunis

16 July 2005
18:30

| Puerto Rico | 67–84 | Serbia and Montenegro |

Tunis

16 July 2005
20:30

| South Korea | 77–98 | Russia |

Tunis

17 July 2005
16:30

| Serbia and Montenegro | 68–94 | United States |

Tunis

17 July 2005
18:30

| DR Congo | 53–84 | Russia |

Tunis

17 July 2005
20:30

| Puerto Rico | 92–112 | South Korea |

Tunis

19 July 2005
16:30

| South Korea | 77–65 | DR Congo |

Tunis

19 July 2005
18:30

| Russia | 88–87 | Serbia and Montenegro |

Tunis

19 July 2005
20:30

| United States | 116–28 | Puerto Rico |

Tunis

20 July 2005
16:30

| Serbia and Montenegro | 88–74 | DR Congo |

Tunis

20 July 2005
18:30

| Puerto Rico | 43–87 | Russia |

Tunis

20 July 2005
20:30

| United States | 129–74 | South Korea |

Tunis

=== Group B ===
| Team | Pld | W | L | PF | PA | PD | Pts | Tiebreak |
|---|---|---|---|---|---|---|---|---|
| Australia | 5 | 4 | 1 | 337 | 297 | +40 | 9 | 1-0 |
| China | 5 | 4 | 1 | 382 | 312 | +70 | 9 | 0-1 |
| Spain | 5 | 3 | 2 | 324 | 274 | +50 | 8 | 1-0 |
| Hungary | 5 | 3 | 2 | 322 | 297 | +25 | 8 | 0-1 |
| Canada | 5 | 1 | 4 | 283 | 340 | −57 | 6 | |
| Tunisia | 5 | 0 | 5 | 261 | 389 | -128 | 5 | |

15 July 2005
10:00

| Hungary | 55–66 | China |

Nabeul

15 July 2005
12:00

| Spain | 50–53 | Australia |

Nabeul

15 July 2005
18:30

| Tunisia | 53–69 | Canada |

Nabeul

16 July 2005
16:30

| China | 85–66 | Spain |

Nabeul

16 July 2005
18:30

| Australia | 68–47 | Tunisia |

Nabeul

16 July 2005
20:30

| Canada | 44–71 | Hungary |

Nabeul

17 July 2005
16:30

| Hungary | 61–57 | Australia |

Nabeul

17 July 2005
18:30

| Tunisia | 46–82 | Spain |

Nabeul

17 July 2005
20:30

| Canada | 60–77 | China |

Nabeul

19 July 2005
16:30

| Australia | 82–73 | Canada |

Nabeul

19 July 2005
18:30

| China | 88–54 | Tunisia |

Nabeul

19 July 2005
20:30

| Spain | 69–53 | Hungary |

Nabeul

20 July 2005
16:30

| Australia | 77–66 | China |

Nabeul

20 July 2005
18:30

| Hungary | 82–61 | Tunisia |

Nabeul

20 July 2005
20:30

| Canada | 37–57 | Spain |

Nabeul

== Knockout stage ==
=== Bracket ===
Quarter-finals
22 July
Russia | 79
Spain | 62
22 July
Australia | 70
Serbia and Montenegro | 76
22 July
China | 93
South Korea | 72
22 July
United States | 85
Hungary | 55

Semi-finals
23 July
Russia | 65
Serbia and Montenegro | 78
23 July
China | 68
United States | 99

Final
24 July
Serbia and Montenegro | 76
United States | 97
Third place
24 July
Russia | 61
China | 78

5th place bracket

Semi-finals
23 July
South Korea | 92
Hungary | 70
23 July
Spain | 75
Australia | 71

Fifth place
24 July
South Korea | 71
Spain | 75
Seventh place
24 July
Hungary | 62
Australia | 68

9th place bracket

Semi-finals
22 July
Canada | 67
DR Congo | 51
22 July
Puerto Rico | 77
Tunisia | 63

Ninth place
23 July
Canada | 71
Puerto Rico | 64
Eleventh place
23 July
DR Congo | 78
Tunisia | 60

=== Quarterfinals ===
22 July 2005
14:30

| China | 93–72 | South Korea |

Tunis

22 July 2005
16:30

| United States | 85–55 | Hungary |

Tunis

22 July 2005
18:30

| Russia | 79–62 | Spain |

Tunis

22 July 2005
20:30

| Australia | 70–76 | Serbia and Montenegro |

Tunis

=== Classification 9–12 ===
22 July 2005
16:30

| Canada | 67–51 | DR Congo |

Nabeul

22 July 2005
18:30

| Puerto Rico | 77–63 | Tunisia |

Nabeul

=== Classification 5–8 ===
23 July 2005
14:30

| South Korea | 92–70 | Hungary |

Tunis

23 July 2005
16:30

| Spain | 79–68 | Australia |

Tunis

=== Semifinals ===
23 July 2005
18:30

| China | 68–99 | United States |

Tunis

23 July 2005
20:30

| Russia | 65–78 | Serbia and Montenegro |

Tunis

=== Eleventh place game ===
23 July 2005
16:30

| DR Congo | 78–60 | Tunisia |

Nabeul

=== Ninth place game ===
23 July 2005
18:30

| Canada | 71–64 | Puerto Rico |

Nabeul

=== Seventh place game ===
24 July 2005
10:00

| Hungary | 62–68 | Australia |

Tunis

=== Fifth place game ===
24 July 2005
12:00

| South Korea | 71–75 | Spain |

Tunis

=== Third place game ===
24 July 2005
16:30

| China | 78–61 | Russia |

Tunis

=== Final ===
24 July 2005
18:30

| Serbia and Montenegro | 76–97 | United States |

Tunis

== Final standings ==
| # | Team | W-L |
|---|---|---|
| | United States | 8-0 |
| | Serbia and Montenegro | 4-4 |
| | China | 6-2 |
| 4 | Russia | 4-3 |
| 5 | Spain | 5-3 |
| 6 | (South Korea) Korea | 4-4 |
| 7 | Australia | 5-3 |
| 8 | Hungary | 3-5 |
| 9 | Canada | 3-4 |
| 10 | Puerto Rico | 2-5 |
| 11 | (Democratic Republic of the Congo) DR Congo | 1-6 |
| 12 | Tunisia | 0-7 |

== Awards ==
2005 FIBA Women's World Junior Championship winner

United States
Second title

Most Valuable Player
(United States) Crystal Langhorne
