= FIBA Under-19 Women's Basketball World Cup =

International basketball tournament

FIBA U19 Women's Basketball World Cup
- Upcoming season or competition: 2027 FIBA Under-19 Women's Basketball World Cup
- Formerly: FIBA Under-19 World Championship for Women
- Sport: Basketball
- Founded: 1985; 41 years ago
- First season: 1985
- Organizing body: FIBA
- No. of teams: 16
- Continents: All (World)
- Most recent champions: United States (11th title)
- Most titles: United States (11 titles)
- Related competitions: FIBA Under-17 Women's Basketball World Cup
- Website: fiba.basketball/history

The FIBA U19 Women's Basketball World Cup (formerly FIBA Under-19 World Championship for Women) is the under-19 women's world basketball championship organized by the International Basketball Federation (FIBA). From its inauguration in 1985, until 2005, it was held every four years. Since 2005, it has been held biennially.

The reigning world champions are United States, winning the tournament in 2025. The next edition will be held in China in 2027.

== Composition ==
According to the updated FIBA Internal Regulations, the FIBA U19 World Cup shall be held every two years (2023, 2025, 2027, etc.).

Sixteen teams, representing all continents, are eligible to participate in the FIBA U19 World Cup as follows:

- Directly qualified:
  - The host nation (usually designated by the Central Board a year before the scheduled tournament)
- From each continent:
  - Two from FIBA Africa: Finalists of the FIBA U18 Women's AfroBasket
  - Four from FIBA Americas: Semi-finalists of the FIBA U18 Women's AmeriCup
  - Four from FIBA Asia and FIBA Oceania: Semi-finalists of the FIBA U18 Women's Asia Cup
  - Five from FIBA Europe: Semi-finalists and the fifth-placed team of the FIBA U18 Women's EuroBasket

== Summaries ==
Year	Hosts	Final			Third place match		
Year	Hosts	Champions	Score	Runners-up	Third place	Score	Fourth place
1985	(United States); Colorado Springs	Soviet Union	80–75	South Korea	Yugoslavia	86–63	China
1989	(Spain); Bilbao	Soviet Union	109–93	Yugoslavia	Australia	69–61	Czechoslovakia
1993	(South Korea); Seoul	Australia	72–54	Russia	Poland	74–53	South Korea
1997	(Brazil); Natal	United States	78–74	Australia	Slovakia	45–40	Brazil
2001	(Czech Republic); Brno	Czech Republic	82–80	Russia	United States	77–72	Australia
2005	(Tunisia); Nabeul / Tunis	United States	97–76	Serbia and Montenegro	China	78–61	Russia
2007	(Slovakia); Bratislava	United States	99–57	Sweden	Serbia	52–50	Spain
2009	(Thailand); Bangkok	United States	87–71	Spain	Argentina	58–51	Canada
2011	(Chile); Puerto Montt / Puerto Varas	United States	69–46	Spain	Brazil	70–67	Australia
2013	(Lithuania); Klaipėda / Panevėžys	United States	61–28	France	Australia	73–68	Spain
2015	(Russia); Chekhov / Vidnoye	United States	78–70	Russia	Australia	69–62	Spain
2017	(Italy); Udine / Cividale del Friuli	Russia	86–82	United States	Canada	67–60	Japan
2019	(Thailand); Bangkok	United States	74–70	Australia	Spain	58–52	Belgium
2021	(Hungary); Debrecen	United States	70–52	Australia	Hungary	88–67	Mali
2023	(Spain); Madrid	United States	69–66	Spain	Canada	80–73 (OT)	France
2025	(Czech Republic); Brno	United States	88–76	Australia	Spain	70–68	Canada
2027; Details	(China); Chengdu						
2029; Details	(Mexico); TBD						

== Medal table ==
Rank	Nation	Gold	Silver	Bronze	Total
1	United States	11	1	1	13
2	Soviet Union †	2	0	0	2
3	Australia	1	4	3	8
4	Russia	1	3	0	4
5	Czech Republic	1	0	0	1
6	Spain	0	3	2	5
7	Yugoslavia †	0	1	1	2
8	France	0	1	0	1
8	Serbia and Montenegro †	0	1	0	1
8	South Korea	0	1	0	1
8	Sweden	0	1	0	1
12	Canada	0	0	2	2
13	Argentina	0	0	1	1
13	Brazil	0	0	1	1
13	China	0	0	1	1
13	Hungary	0	0	1	1
13	Poland	0	0	1	1
13	Serbia	0	0	1	1
13	Slovakia	0	0	1	1
Totals (19 entries)		16	16	16	48

== Participation details ==
Team	(United States) 1985	(Spain) 1989	(South Korea) 1993	(Brazil) 1997	(Czech Republic) 2001	(Tunisia) 2005	(Slovakia) 2007	(Thailand) 2009	(Chile) 2011	(Lithuania) 2013	(Russia) 2015	(Italy) 2017	(Thailand) 2019	(Hungary) 2021	(Spain) 2023	(Czech Republic) 2025	(China) 2027	Total
Argentina	–	–	–	9th	–	–	14th	3rd	13th	14th	15th	–	12th	15th	16th	15th	Q	11
Australia	6th	3rd	1st	2nd	4th	7th	5th	5th	4th	3rd	3rd	6th	2nd	2nd	9th	2nd	Q	17
Belgium	–	–	–	–	–	–	–	–	–	–	6th	–	4th	–	–	–	Q	3
Brazil	–	8th	5th	4th	7th	–	10th	9th	3rd	6th	10th	–	–	16th	14th	14th	–	12
Bulgaria	–	11th	9th	–	–	–	–	–	–	–	–	–	–	–	–	–	–	2
Canada	8th	–	–	–	–	9th	9th	4th	5th	7th	8th	3rd	6th	5th	3rd	4th	Q	13
Chile	–	–	–	–	–	–	–	–	12th	–	–	–	–	–	–	–	–	1
China	4th	9th	11th	7th	9th	3rd	11th	11th	9th	5th	7th	7th	5th	–	13th	11th	Q	16
Chinese Taipei	–	–	12th	–	–	–	–	–	11th	–	14th	–	–	14th	15th	–	Q	6
Colombia	–	–	–	–	–	–	–	–	–	–	–	–	11th	–	–	–	–	1
Cuba	9th	10th	–	11th	6th	–	–	–	–	–	–	–	–	–	–	–	–	4
Czech Republic	Part of TCH		–	6th	1st	–	7th	10th	–	–	–	–	–	6th	7th	13th	–	7
Czechoslovakia †	–	4th	defunct															1
DR Congo	–	12th	10th	–	–	11th	–	–	–	–	–	–	–	–	–	–	–	3
Egypt	–	–	–	–	–	–	–	–	15th	–	16th	16th	–	12th	12th	–	–	5
Finland	–	–	–	–	–	–	–	–	–	–	–	–	–	–	–	–	Q	1
France	–	–	6th	–	5th	–	–	7th	6th	2nd	5th	5th	–	10th	4th	5th	Q	11
Germany	–	–	–	–	–	–	–	–	–	–	–	–	13th	–	10th	–	–	2
Hungary	–	–	–	–	–	8th	–	–	–	–	–	9th	10th	3rd	–	8th	–	5
Israel	–	–	–	–	–	–	–	–	–	–	–	–	–	–	–	10th	–	1
Italy	–	–	–	–	–	–	–	–	10th	–	–	11th	–	11th	11th	–	–	4
Ivory Coast	–	–	–	–	–	–	16th	–	–	–	–	–	–	–	–	–	–	1
Japan	–	–	8th	12th	11th	–	13th	12th	7th	8th	DQ	4th	8th	9th	6th	6th	Q	13
Latvia	Part of URS		–	–	–	–	–	–	–	–	–	10th	14th	–	–	–	–	2
Lithuania	Part of URS		–	–	8th	–	12th	8th	–	12th	–	–	–	–	8th	–	–	5
Mali	–	–	–	10th	12th	–	15th	14th	–	15th	12th	13th	7th	4th	5th	DQ	Q	12
Mexico	–	–	–	–	–	–	–	–	–	–	–	12th	–	–	–	–	–	1
Mozambique	–	–	–	–	–	–	–	–	–	–	–	–	15th	–	–	–	–	1
Netherlands	–	–	–	–	–	–	–	–	–	10th	9th	–	–	–	–	–	–	2
Nigeria	–	–	–	–	–	–	–	–	16th	–	–	–	–	–	–	12th	Q	3
Poland	–	–	3rd	–	10th	–	–	–	–	–	–	–	–	–	–	–	–	2
Portugal	–	–	–	–	–	–	–	–	–	–	–	–	–	–	–	7th	–	1
Puerto Rico	–	–	–	–	–	10th	–	–	–	–	–	14th	–	–	–	–	–	2
Russia	Part of URS		2nd	5th	2nd	4th	–	6th	8th	9th	2nd	1st	–	8th	–	–	–	10
Senegal	10th	–	–	–	–	–	–	–	–	16th	–	–	–	–	–	–	–	2
Serbia	Part of YUG		Part of SCG				3rd	–	–	11th	11th	–	–	–	–	–	Q	4
Serbia and Montenegro †	Part of YUG		–	–	–	2nd	defunct											1
Slovakia	Part of TCH		–	3rd	–	–	6th	–	–	–	–	–	–	–	–	–	–	2
Slovenia	Part of YUG		–	–	–	–	–	–	14th	–	–	–	–	–	–	–	–	1
South Korea	2nd	6th	4th	–	–	6th	8th	13th	–	13th	13th	15th	9th	13th	–	9th	Q	13
Soviet Union †	1st	1st	defunct															2
Spain	7th	5th	–	8th	–	5th	4th	2nd	2nd	4th	4th	8th	3rd	7th	2nd	3rd	Q	15
Sweden	–	–	–	–	–	–	2nd	–	–	–	–	–	–	–	–	–	–	1
Thailand	–	–	–	–	–	–	–	16th	–	–	–	–	16th	–	–	–	–	2
Tunisia	–	–	–	–	–	12th	–	15th	–	–	–	–	–	–	–	–	–	2
United States	5th	7th	7th	1st	3rd	1st	1st	1st	1st	1st	1st	2nd	1st	1st	1st	1st	Q	17
Venezuela	–	–	–	–	–	–	–	–	–	–	–	–	–	–	–	–	Q	1
Yugoslavia †	3rd	2nd	defunct															2
Total	10	12	12	12	12	12	16	16	16	16	16	16	16	16	16	16	16	

== Tournament awards ==
=== Most recent award winners (2025) ===
Award	Winner	Team
Most Valuable Player	Saniyah Hall	United States
All-Tournament Team	Bonnie Deas	Australia
All-Tournament Team	Syla Swords	Canada
All-Tournament Team	Saniyah Hall	United States
All-Tournament Team	Somtochukwu Okafor	Spain
All-Tournament Team	Sienna Betts	United States

== Debut of national teams ==
Year	Debutants
1985	Australia, Canada, China, Cuba, Senegal, Soviet Union; South Korea, Spain, United States, Yugoslavia
1989	Brazil, Bulgaria, Czechoslovakia, DR Congo
1993	Chinese Taipei, France, Japan, Poland, Russia
1997	Argentina, Czech Republic, Mali, Slovakia
2001	Lithuania
2005	Hungary, Puerto Rico, Serbia and Montenegro, Tunisia
2007	Ivory Coast, Serbia, Sweden
2009	Thailand
2011	Chile, Egypt, Italy, Nigeria, Slovenia
2013	Netherlands
2015	Belgium
2017	Latvia, Mexico
2019	Colombia, Germany, Mozambique
2021	None
2023	None
2025	Israel, Portugal
2027	Finland, Venezuela
2029	TBD

== Teams by number of appearances ==
- Teams in **bold** have qualified for the 2027 edition.

Team	App	Record streak	Active streak	Debut	Most recent	Best result (* hosts)
**Australia**	17	17	17	1985	2027	Champions (1993)
**United States**	17	17	17	1985	2027	Champions (1997, 2005, 2007, 2009, 2011, 2013, 2015, 2019, 2021, 2023, 2025)
**China**	16	13	3	1985	2027	Third place (2005)
**Spain**	15	12	12	1985	2027	Runners-up (2009, 2011, 2023*)
**Canada**	13	12	12	1985	2027	Third place (2017, 2023)
**Japan**	13	6	6	1993	2027	Fourth place (2017)
**South Korea**	13	5	2	1985	2027	Runners-up (1985)
Brazil	12	5	0	1989	2025	Third place (2011)
**Mali**	12	8	8	1997	2027	Fourth place (2021)
**Argentina**	11	5	5	1997	2027	Third place (2009)
**France**	10	6	3	1993	2025	Runners-up (2013)
Russia	10	5	0	1993	2021	Champions (2017)
Czech Republic	7	3	3	1997	2025	Champions (2001*)
**Chinese Taipei**	6	2	1	1993	2027	11th (2011)
Egypt	5	2	0	2011	2023	12th (2021, 2023)
Hungary	5	3	1	2005	2025	Third place (2021)
Lithuania	5	2	0	2001	2023	8th (2001, 2009, 2023)
Cuba	4	2	0	1985	2001	6th (2001)
Italy	4	2	0	2011	2023	10th (2011)
DR Congo	3	2	0	1989	2005	10th (1993)
Serbia	3	2	0	2007	2015	Third place (2007)
Belgium	2	1	0	2015	2019	Fourth place (2019)
Bulgaria	2	2	0	1989	1993	9th (1993)
Germany	2	1	0	2019	2023	10th (2023)
Latvia	2	2	0	2017	2019	10th (2017)
Netherlands	2	2	0	2013	2015	9th (2015)
Nigeria	3	2	2	2011	2027	12th (2025)
Poland	2	1	0	1993	2001	Third place (1993)
Puerto Rico	2	1	0	2005	2017	10th (2005)
Senegal	2	1	0	1985	2013	10th (1985)
Slovakia	2	1	0	1997	2007	Third place (1997)
Soviet Union †	2	2	—	1985	1989	Champions (1985, 1989)
Thailand	2	1	0	2009	2019	16th (2009*, 2019*)
Tunisia	2	1	0	2005	2009	12th (2005*)
Yugoslavia †	2	2	—	1985	1989	Runners-up (1989)
Chile	1	1	0	2011	2011	12th (2011*)
Colombia	1	1	0	2019	2019	11th (2019)
Czechoslovakia †	1	1	—	1989	1989	Fourth place (1989)
Israel	1	1	1	2025	2025	10th (2025)
Ivory Coast	1	1	0	2007	2007	16th (2007)
Mexico	1	1	0	2017	2017	12th (2017)
Mozambique	1	1	0	2019	2019	15th (2019)
Portugal	1	1	1	2025	2025	7th (2025)
Serbia and Montenegro †	1	1	—	2005	2005	Runners-up (2005)
Slovenia	1	1	0	2011	2011	14th (2011)
Sweden	1	1	0	2007	2007	Runners-up (2007)
**Finland**	1	1	1	2027	2027	tbd (2027)
**Venezuela**	1	1	1	2027	2027	tbd (2027)

== Overall win–loss record ==
- Teams in **bold** have qualified for the 2027 edition.

Team	App	Played	Won	Lost	%
**United States**	17	120	107	13	89.2
**Australia**	16	119	86	33	72.3
Spain	14	105	67	38	63.8
**China**	16	108	51	57	47.2
**Canada**	13	90	50	40	55.6
France	10	75	49	26	65.3
Russia	10	75	49	26	65.3
Brazil	12	89	39	50	43.8
**South Korea**	12	83	36	47	43.4
**Japan**	12	87	35	52	40.2
Czech Republic	7	51	28	23	54.9
Mali	11	65	19	46	29.2
**Argentina**	11	66	19	47	28.8
Hungary	5	36	18	18	50
Serbia	3	24	14	10	58.3
Soviet Union †	2	13	12	1	92.3
Italy	4	29	12	17	41.4
Slovakia	2	16	11	5	68.8
Belgium	2	14	10	4	71.4
Yugoslavia †	2	13	10	3	76.9
Lithuania	5	39	10	29	25.6
Cuba	4	26	9	17	34.6
Netherlands	2	15	8	7	53.3
Latvia	2	14	7	7	50
Poland	2	14	7	7	50
**Chinese Taipei**	5	36	7	29	19.4
Bulgaria	2	14	6	8	42.9
Sweden	1	9	6	3	66.7
Germany	2	14	5	9	35.7
Egypt	5	33	5	28	15.2
Czechoslovakia †	1	7	4	3	57.1
Portugal	1	7	4	3	57.1
Serbia and Montenegro †	1	8	4	4	50
Puerto Rico	2	14	3	11	21.4
Colombia	1	7	3	4	42.9
Israel	1	6	2	4	33.3
Mozambique	1	7	2	5	28.6
Nigeria	2	12	2	10	16.7
DR Congo	3	21	2	19	9.5
Slovenia	1	5	1	4	20
Mexico	1	7	1	6	14.3
Chile	1	8	1	7	12.5
Tunisia	2	12	1	11	8.3
Thailand	2	12	0	12	0
Senegal	2	11	0	11	0
Ivory Coast	1	5	0	5	0
**Finland**	1	0	0	0	—
**Venezuela**	1	0	0	0	—

== See also ==
- FIBA Under-17 Women's Basketball World Cup
- FIBA Under-17 Basketball World Cup
- FIBA Under-19 Basketball World Cup
