= 2017 FIBA Under-19 Women's Basketball World Cup squads =

This article shows the rosters of all participating teams at the 2017 FIBA Under-19 Women's Basketball World Cup in Italy.

== Group A ==
=== China ===
China women's national under-19 basketball team roster
Players
Coaches

Pos.	No.	Name	Age – Date of birth	Height	Club	Ctr.
G	4	Zhuoya Fang	16 – 26 October 2000	1.66 m (5 ft 5 in)	Sichuan Whales	(China)
G	5	Yuan Li	17 – 29 May 2000	1.70 m (5 ft 7 in)	Shandong	(China)
G	6	Jiaqi Wang	18 – 6 February 1999	1.70 m (5 ft 7 in)	Zhejiang	(China)
F	7	Shuangyan Tan	18 – 19 December 1998	1.77 m (5 ft 10 in)	Guangdong	(China)
F	8	Lu Liu	18 – 12 February 1999	1.81 m (5 ft 11 in)	Bayi Kylins	(China)
F	9	Xueyuan Liu	16 – 8 September 2000	1.82 m (6 ft 0 in)	Bayi Kylins	(China)
F	10	Saiqi Jia	18 – 30 December 1998	1.86 m (6 ft 1 in)	Bayi Kylins	(China)
F	11	Liwen Liang	18 – 23 February 1999	1.90 m (6 ft 3 in)	Shanghai	(China)
C	12	Yu Tang	18 – 10 March 1999	1.91 m (6 ft 3 in)	Beijing	(China)
C	13	Xu Han	17 – 31 October 1999	2.05 m (6 ft 9 in)	Shandong	(China)
F	33	Yijia Cao	17 – 14 August 1999	1.83 m (6 ft 0 in)	Guangxi	(China)

Head coach

- (China) Cong Xuedi

Assistant coach(es)

- (China) Li Jianxin

Legend

- Club – describes current
  club as of tournament
- Age – describes age
  on 22 July 2017

=== Italy ===
Italy women's national under-19 basketball team roster
Players
Coaches

Pos.	No.	Name	Age – Date of birth	Height	Club	Ctr.
G	4	Elisa Pinzan	18 – 24 January 1999	1.70 m (5 ft 7 in)	Pordenone	(Italy)
G	5	Anna Togliani	19 – 26 May 1998	1.70 m (5 ft 7 in)	Venezia	(Italy)
G	6	Giulia Togliani	19 – 26 May 1998	1.70 m (5 ft 7 in)	Crema	(Italy)
G	7	Giulia Ianezic	17 – 16 April 2000	1.76 m (5 ft 9 in)	Muggia	(Italy)
G	8	Flavia de Cassan	18 – 8 December 1998	1.77 m (5 ft 10 in)	Napoli	(Italy)
G	9	Martina Fassina	18 – 7 April 1999	1.82 m (6 ft 0 in)	San Martino di Lupari	(Italy)
G	12	Francesca Parmesani	19 – 21 March 1998	1.80 m (5 ft 11 in)	Crema	(Italy)
C	13	Lorela Cubaj	18 – 8 January 1999	1.92 m (6 ft 4 in)	Georgia Tech	(United States)
F	14	Sara Madera	17 – 28 June 2000	1.88 m (6 ft 2 in)	Venezia	(Italy)
C	15	Olbis Futo Andre	18 – 25 December 1998	1.92 m (6 ft 4 in)	Battipaglia	(Italy)
F	16	Elena Castello	19 – 31 March 1998	1.82 m (6 ft 0 in)	Broni	(Italy)
C	18	Elisa Pontoni	19 – 25 May 1998	1.85 m (6 ft 1 in)	Udine	(Italy)

Head coach

- (Italy) Giovanni Lucchesi

Assistant coach(es)

- (Italy) Francesco Iurlaro
- (Italy) Luca Visconti

Legend

- Club – describes current
  club as of tournament
- Age – describes age
  on 22 July 2017

=== Mali ===
Mali women's national under-19 basketball team roster
Players
Coaches

Pos.	No.	Name	Age – Date of birth	Height	Club	Ctr.
F	4	Kamba Yoro Diakite	18 – 1 February 1999	1.73 m (5 ft 8 in)	Stade	(Mali)
C	5	Rokia Doumbia	18 – 5 May 1999	1.75 m (5 ft 9 in)	Hamilton Heights	(United States)
F	6	Safiatou Mariko	17 – 20 March 2000	1.83 m (6 ft 0 in)	Stade	(Mali)
G	7	Aminata Diakite	18 – 27 September 1998	1.65 m (5 ft 5 in)	Attar	(Mali)
F	8	Foune Sissoko	18 – 11 January 1999	1.66 m (5 ft 5 in)	DAC	(Mali)
G	9	Djeneba Sangare	17 – 7 October 1999	1.75 m (5 ft 9 in)	Stade	(Mali)
F	10	Saran Traoré	19 – 13 March 1998	1.91 m (6 ft 3 in)
G	11	Gnere Alima Dembele	17 – 20 January 2000	1.80 m (5 ft 11 in)	CNE III	(Mali)
F	12	Mariam Drame	16 – 9 August 2000	1.83 m (6 ft 0 in)	Attar	(Mali)
G	13	Assetou Diakite	19 – 15 February 1998	1.92 m (6 ft 4 in)	Stade	(Mali)
F	14	Adama Coulibaly	19 – 25 January 1998	1.82 m (6 ft 0 in)	DAC	(Mali)
F	15	Salimatou Kourouma	17 – 25 September 1999	1.79 m (5 ft 10 in)	Attar	(Mali)

Head coach

- (France) Amadou Bamba

Assistant coach(es)

- (Mali) Abdoulaye Maiga

Legend

- Club – describes current
  club as of tournament
- Age – describes age
  on 22 July 2017

=== United States ===
United States women's national under-19 basketball team roster
Players
Coaches

Pos.	No.	Name	Age – Date of birth	Height	Club	Ctr.
G	4	Crystal Dangerfield	19 – 11 May 1998	1.67 m (5 ft 6 in)	UConn Huskies	(United States)
G	5	Reili Richardson	18 – 9 October 1998	1.77 m (5 ft 10 in)	Arizona State Sun Devils	(United States)
G	6	Tyasha Harris	19 – 1 May 1998	1.77 m (5 ft 10 in)	South Carolina Gamecocks	(United States)
G	7	Alecia Sutton	18 – 17 December 1998	1.82 m (6 ft 0 in)	Texas Longhorns	(United States)
G	8	Chennedy Carter	18 – 14 November 1998	1.75 m (5 ft 9 in)	Texas A&M Aggies	(United States)
F	9	Jeannie Boehm	19 – 10 February 1998	1.90 m (6 ft 3 in)	Harvard Crimson	(United States)
F	10	Ruthy Hebard	19 – 28 April 1998	1.93 m (6 ft 4 in)	Oregon Ducks	(United States)
G	11	Megan Walker	18 – 23 November 1998	1.85 m (6 ft 1 in)	UConn Huskies	(United States)
G	12	Christyn Williams	17 – 20 May 2000	1.77 m (5 ft 10 in)	Central Arkansas Christian	(United States)
F	13	Kayla Overbeck	18 – 8 August 1998	1.85 m (6 ft 1 in)	Vanderbilt Commodores	(United States)
G	14	Bella Alarie	19 – 23 April 1998	1.95 m (6 ft 5 in)	Princeton Tigers	(United States)
F	15	Joyner Holmes	19 – 22 February 1998	1.90 m (6 ft 3 in)	Texas Longhorns	(United States)

Head coach

- (United States) Suzie McConnell-Serio

Assistant coach(es)

- (United States) Kamie Ethridge
- (United States) Charlotte Smith

Legend

- Club – describes current
  club as of tournament
- Age – describes age
  on 22 July 2017

== Group B ==
=== Egypt ===
Egypt women's national under-19 basketball team roster
Players
Coaches

Pos.	No.	Name	Age – Date of birth	Height	Club	Ctr.
G	4	Meral Abdelgawad	18 – 13 November 1998	1.81 m (5 ft 11 in)	Elshams	(Egypt)
G	5	Rana Elseady	19 – 1 April 1998	1.79 m (5 ft 10 in)	Alahly	(Egypt)
G	6	Tokka Elshewekh	17 – 15 August 1999	1.76 m (5 ft 9 in)	Alahly	(Egypt)
G	8	Asrar Bakr	18 – 10 August 1998	1.80 m (5 ft 11 in)	Sporting	(Egypt)
F	9	Mariam Khalaf	19 – 18 April 1998	1.75 m (5 ft 9 in)	Smoha	(Egypt)
F	10	Hana Ghonim	18 – 9 December 1998	1.79 m (5 ft 10 in)	Sporting	(Egypt)
F	11	Radwa Sherif	19 – 1 February 1998	1.86 m (6 ft 1 in)	Al Jazeera	(Egypt)
F	12	Rana Abdelfattah	19 – 18 January 1998	1.82 m (6 ft 0 in)	Alahly	(Egypt)
F	13	Nadine Rehan	18 – 1 October 1998	1.84 m (6 ft 0 in)	Sporting	(Egypt)
F	14	Raneem Elbarky	16 – 23 November 2000	1.84 m (6 ft 0 in)	Alahly	(Egypt)
C	15	Nesma Khalifa	18 – 1 January 1999	1.91 m (6 ft 3 in)	Sporting	(Egypt)
C	74	Ganna Marouf	19 – 21 March 1998	1.83 m (6 ft 0 in)	Alahly	(Egypt)

Head coach

- (Egypt) Haytham Eid

Assistant coach(es)

- (Egypt) Aly Ahmed

Legend

- Club – describes current
  club as of tournament
- Age – describes age
  on 22 July 2017

=== Puerto Rico ===
Puerto Rico women's national under-19 basketball team roster
Players
Coaches

Pos.	No.	Name	Age – Date of birth	Height	Club	Ctr.
G	2	Cydney Rivera	17 – 15 September 1999	1.67 m (5 ft 6 in)	Lutheran North	(United States)
F	4	Vianca Malave	19 – 19 February 1998	1.77 m (5 ft 10 in)	Colegio de Mayaguez	(Puerto Rico)
G	5	Geolibeth Perez	19 – 6 February 1998	1.67 m (5 ft 6 in)	Stony Brook Seawolves	(United States)
G	6	Leyinska Rivera	19 – 3 June 1998	1.67 m (5 ft 6 in)	Ponce Leonas	(Puerto Rico)
F	7	Kaelyn Gonzalez	18 – 17 August 1998	1.75 m (5 ft 9 in)	Vaqueras de Bayamon	(Puerto Rico)
G	11	Veronica Cancio	18 – 15 April 1999	1.62 m (5 ft 4 in)	Vaqueras de Bayamon	(Puerto Rico)
F	13	Nairimar Vargas	17 – 24 March 2000	1.82 m (6 ft 0 in)	Colegio de Ingenieros	(Puerto Rico)
F	14	Nicolette Oppenheimer	18 – 22 June 1999	1.72 m (5 ft 8 in)	Syracuse Orange	(United States)
G	15	Yari Martinez	18 – 4 April 1999	1.65 m (5 ft 5 in)	Vaqueras de Bayamon	(Puerto Rico)
C	16	Gabriela Santana	16 – 17 December 2000	1.87 m (6 ft 2 in)	Bayamon Basket City	(Puerto Rico)
F	20	Angelique Rodriguez	18 – 20 March 1999	1.80 m (5 ft 11 in)	Pittsburgh Panthers	(United States)
C	33	India Pagan	18 – 7 January 1999	1.87 m (6 ft 2 in)	Stony Brook Seawolves	(United States)

Head coach

- (Puerto Rico) Gerardo Batista

Assistant coach(es)

- (Puerto Rico) Fernarndo Casablanca Torres

Legend

- Club – describes current
  club as of tournament
- Age – describes age
  on 22 July 2017

=== Russia ===
Russia women's national under-19 basketball team roster
Players
Coaches

Pos.	No.	Name	Age – Date of birth	Height	Club	Ctr.
G	1	Viktoriia Zavialova	18 – 16 October 1998	1.70 m (5 ft 7 in)	UMMC Ekaterinburg JR	(Russia)
G	3	Olga Stolyar	17 – 30 September 1999	1.69 m (5 ft 7 in)	Dynamo Kursk JR	(Russia)
F	4	Raisa Musina	19 – 31 March 1998	1.92 m (6 ft 4 in)	UMMC Ekaterinburg	(Russia)
G	5	Olesya Safonova	18 – 22 April 1999	1.77 m (5 ft 10 in)	Dynamo Kursk JR	(Russia)
C	7	Maria Vadeeva	19 – 16 July 1998	1.94 m (6 ft 4 in)	Dynamo Kursk	(Russia)
G	9	Margarita Pleskevich	18 – 12 February 1999	1.75 m (5 ft 9 in)	Dynamo Moscow 2	(Russia)
G	10	Daria Kurilchuk	19 – 14 February 1998	1.81 m (5 ft 11 in)	Spartak Moscow	(Russia)
G	11	Elya Oleynikova	19 – 4 June 1998	1.78 m (5 ft 10 in)	Dynamo Moscow 2	(Russia)
F	12	Sofya Kornyenko	19 – 20 July 1998	1.87 m (6 ft 2 in)	Dynamo Kursk JR	(Russia)
G	13	Svetlana Kramar	19 – 11 July 1998	1.77 m (5 ft 10 in)	Nadezhda Orenburg 2	(Russia)
C	14	Valentina Kozhukhar	18 – 14 March 1999	1.88 m (6 ft 2 in)	Dynamo Kursk JR	(Russia)
F	18	Victoria Cheren	19 – 12 May 1998	1.87 m (6 ft 2 in)	Dynamo Kursk JR	(Russia)

Head coach

- (Russia) Alexander Kovalev

Assistant coach(es)

- (Russia) Denis Kandalov
- (Russia) Andrey Ruzanov

Legend

- Club – describes current
  club as of tournament
- Age – describes age
  on 22 July 2017

=== Spain ===
Spain women's national under-19 basketball team roster
Players
Coaches

Pos.	No.	Name	Age – Date of birth	Height	Club	Ctr.
G	4	Lucia Alonso	19 – 10 April 1998	1.78 m (5 ft 10 in)	Arizona Wildcats	(United States)
F	5	Maria Erauncetamurguil	18 – 28 July 1998	1.84 m (6 ft 0 in)	IDK Guipuzkoa	(Spain)
G	7	Laura Pena	18 – 10 December 1998	1.73 m (5 ft 8 in)	Sant Adrià	(Spain)
G	8	Irati Etxarri	18 – 26 July 1998	1.85 m (6 ft 1 in)	Araski	(Spain)
G	9	Aina Ayuso	17 – 1 August 1999	1.78 m (5 ft 10 in)	Segle XXI	(Spain)
C	10	Paula Ginzo	19 – 16 February 1998	1.90 m (6 ft 3 in)	CB Estudiantes	(Spain)
G	12	Maria Barneda	18 – 9 December 1998	1.78 m (5 ft 10 in)	GDKO Bizkaia	(Spain)
C	13	Laia Sole	19 – 18 April 1998	1.88 m (6 ft 2 in)	Maine Black Bears	(United States)
G	14	Sara Iparragirre	18 – 6 November 1998	1.75 m (5 ft 9 in)	IDK Guipuzkoa	(Spain)
F	15	Umi Diallo	19 – 12 January 1998	1.93 m (6 ft 4 in)	Araski	(Spain)
F	16	Montserrat Brotons	18 – 16 September 1998	1.84 m (6 ft 0 in)	Oral Roberts Golden Eagles	(United States)
F	17	Iris Junio	18 – 26 March 1999	1.84 m (6 ft 0 in)	CB Islas Canarias	(Spain)

Head coach

- (Spain) Miguel Angel Ortega

Assistant coach(es)

- (Spain) Jose Luis Alberola
- (Spain) Jacinto Carbajal Masso

Legend

- Club – describes current
  club as of tournament
- Age – describes age
  on 22 July 2017

== Group C ==
=== Canada ===
Canada women's national under-19 basketball team roster
Players
Coaches

Pos.	No.	Name	Age – Date of birth	Height	Club	Ctr.
G	4	Hanna Hall	18 – 17 March 1999	1.60 m (5 ft 3 in)	Buffalo Bulls	(United States)
G	5	Shaina Pellington	18 – 1 June 1999	1.72 m (5 ft 8 in)	Oklahoma Sooners	(United States)
G	6	Libby Epoch	19 – 13 May 1998	1.68 m (5 ft 6 in)	Saskatchewan Huskies	(Canada)
G	7	Kendra van Leeuwen	19 – 23 June 1998	1.75 m (5 ft 9 in)	Wisconsin Badgers	(United States)
F	8	Hailey Brown	18 – 16 June 1999	1.86 m (6 ft 1 in)	Michigan Wolverines	(United States)
F	9	Alyssa Jerome	17 – 1 December 1999	1.88 m (6 ft 2 in)	Stanford Cardinal	(United States)
F	10	Summer Masikewich	18 – 23 July 1998	1.86 m (6 ft 1 in)	Saskatchewan Huskies	(Canada)
F	11	Sarah Donovan	18 – 7 January 1999	1.81 m (5 ft 11 in)	Davidson Wildcats	(United States)
G	12	Aislinn Konig	19 – 20 May 1998	1.76 m (5 ft 9 in)	NC State Wolfpack	(United States)
F	13	Laeticia Amihere	16 – 10 July 2001	1.88 m (6 ft 2 in)	King's Christian Collegiate	(Canada)
F	14	Andrea Torres	19 – 8 June 1998	1.84 m (6 ft 0 in)	Montmorency	(Canada)
C	15	Angela Bongomin	19 – 14 March 1998	1.89 m (6 ft 2 in)	Regina Cougars	(Canada)

Head coach

- (Canada) Caroline Clarke

Assistant coach(es)

- (Canada) Claire Meadows
- (Canada) Ryan Thorne

Legend

- Club – describes current
  club as of tournament
- Age – describes age
  on 22 July 2017

=== France ===
France women's national under-19 basketball team roster
Players
Coaches

Pos.	No.	Name	Age – Date of birth	Height	Club	Ctr.
F	1	Kadiatou Sissoko	18 – 25 January 1999	1.86 m (6 ft 1 in)	CFBB	(France)
G	3	Hortense Limouzin	19 – 1 July 1998	1.64 m (5 ft 5 in)	Basket Landes	(France)
G	5	Loreen Kerboeuf	19 – 8 March 1998	1.79 m (5 ft 10 in)	USO Mondeville	(France)
G	6	Amandine Michaud	19 – 6 March 1998	1.75 m (5 ft 9 in)	Rezé-Nantes Basket 44	(France)
F	11	Myriam Djekoundade	19 – 2 January 1998	1.85 m (6 ft 1 in)	USO Mondeville	(France)
C	16	Shelby Saint Juste	18 – 27 July 1998	1.85 m (6 ft 1 in)	USO Mondeville	(France)
F	23	Marie-Paule Foppossi	19 – 28 January 1998	1.86 m (6 ft 1 in)	Cavigal Nice Basket	(France)
F	24	Amandine Toi	19 – 2 July 1998	1.79 m (5 ft 10 in)	Roannais Basket	(France)
G	32	Tima Pouye	18 – 7 April 1999	1.77 m (5 ft 10 in)	CFBB	(France)
F	33	Maeva Djaldi-Tabdi	18 – 3 December 1998	1.75 m (5 ft 9 in)	Flammes Basket	(France)
G	74	Camille Lenglet	19 – 4 February 1998	1.71 m (5 ft 7 in)	Rezé-Nantes Basket 44	(France)
F	79	Ludivine Marie	19 – 9 January 1998	1.88 m (6 ft 2 in)	Hainaut Saint-Amand	(France)

Head coach

- (France) Julien Egloff

Assistant coach(es)

- (France) David Gauier
- (France) Damien Leroux

Legend

- Club – describes current
  club as of tournament
- Age – describes age
  on 22 July 2017

=== Latvia ===
Latvia women's national under-19 basketball team roster
Players
Coaches

Pos.	No.	Name	Age – Date of birth	Height	Club	Ctr.
G	4	Linda Svenne	19 – 5 January 1998	1.75 m (5 ft 9 in)	TTT Rīga JR	(Latvia)
F	5	Janeta Rozentāle	17 – 26 December 1999	1.86 m (6 ft 1 in)	TTT Rīga JR	(Latvia)
G	6	Maija Gertsone	18 – 14 September 1998	1.69 m (5 ft 7 in)	Vega 1 Liepāja	(Latvia)
G	7	Marianna Kļaviņa	18 – 5 January 1999	1.76 m (5 ft 9 in)	TTT Rīga JR	(Latvia)
F	8	Digna Strautmane	18 – 18 September 1998	1.92 m (6 ft 4 in)	Syracuse Orange	(United States)
G	9	Dinija Pāvelsone	18 – 17 September 1998	1.70 m (5 ft 7 in)	BK Ventspils	(Latvia)
F	10	Alise Markova	16 – 5 October 2000	1.86 m (6 ft 1 in)	TTT Rīga JR	(Latvia)
G	11	Māra Mote	17 – 15 May 2000	1.80 m (5 ft 11 in)	TTT Rīga JR	(Latvia)
G	12	Laura Grabe	19 – 13 February 1998	1.77 m (5 ft 10 in)	TTT Rīga JR	(Latvia)
F	13	Sabīne Lipe	18 – 19 January 1999	1.76 m (5 ft 9 in)	Vega 1 Liepāja	(Latvia)
F	14	Luīze Šepte	17 – 8 October 1999	1.84 m (6 ft 0 in)	BK Ventspils	(Latvia)
F	15	Ivanda Hudjakova	19 – 31 March 1998	1.82 m (6 ft 0 in)	SK Valmiera	(Latvia)

Head coach

- (Latvia) Ainars Cukste

Assistant coach(es)

- (Latvia) Matiss Graudins
- (Latvia) Daiga Zvirble

Legend

- Club – describes current
  club as of tournament
- Age – describes age
  on 22 July 2017

=== South Korea ===
South Korea women's national under-19 basketball team roster
Players
Coaches

Pos.	No.	Name	Age – Date of birth	Height	Club	Ctr.
G	1	So-jung Lee	18 – 16 December 1998	1.67 m (5 ft 6 in)	Cheongju KB Stars	(South Korea)
G	4	Geyong-rim Park	19 – 1 April 1998	1.70 m (5 ft 7 in)	Suwon	(South Korea)
F	5	Ji-hyun Park	17 – 7 April 2000	1.80 m (5 ft 11 in)	Soongeui	(South Korea)
F	6	Hye-mi Lee	18 – 3 December 1998	1.71 m (5 ft 7 in)	Incheon S-Birds	(South Korea)
G	7	Ji-hyun Cha	19 – 14 April 1998	1.72 m (5 ft 8 in)	Guri Winnus	(South Korea)
F	8	Yun-jeong Na	18 – 20 August 1998	1.73 m (5 ft 8 in)	Asan Wibee	(South Korea)
G	9	Se-min Jin	18 – 8 January 1999	1.70 m (5 ft 7 in)	Soongeui	(South Korea)
F	10	Ju-yeon Lee	19 – 29 May 1998	1.70 m (5 ft 7 in)	Yongin Blueminx	(South Korea)
C	11	Dunarang Kim	19 – 13 January 1998	1.78 m (5 ft 10 in)	Suwon	(South Korea)
F	12	Na-yeon Kim	17 – 11 August 1999	1.78 m (5 ft 10 in)	Chuncheon	(South Korea)
C	13	Min-jung Kim	18 – 13 January 1999	1.78 m (5 ft 10 in)	Yongin Blueminx	(South Korea)
C	17	Jie-un Kim	18 – 3 July 1999	1.78 m (5 ft 10 in)	Sookmyung	(South Korea)

Head coach

- (South Korea) Kim Young-min

Assistant coach(es)

- (South Korea) Bang Ji-yun
- (South Korea) Lee Sanghoon

Legend

- Club – describes current
  club as of tournament
- Age – describes age
  on 22 July 2017

== Group D ==
=== Australia ===
Australia women's national under-19 basketball team roster
Players
Coaches

Pos.	No.	Name	Age – Date of birth	Height	Club	Ctr.
G	4	Monique Conti	17 – 9 December 1999	1.65 m (5 ft 5 in)	Melbourne Boomers	(Australia)
G	5	Abby Cubillo	18 – 18 May 1999	1.61 m (5 ft 3 in)	Centre of Excellence	(Australia)
G	6	Jazmin Shelley	17 – 13 May 2000	1.74 m (5 ft 9 in)	Centre of Excellence	(Australia)
F	7	Samantha Simons	17 – 31 January 2000	1.83 m (6 ft 0 in)	Centre of Excellence	(Australia)
G	8	Maddison Rocci	19 – 1 June 1998	1.67 m (5 ft 6 in)	Canberra Capitals	(Australia)
F	9	Kiera Rowe	18 – 9 January 1999	1.84 m (6 ft 0 in)	Dandenong Rangers	(Australia)
F	10	Chloe Bibby	19 – 15 June 1998	1.84 m (6 ft 0 in)	Mississippi State Bulldogs	(United States)
F	11	Anneli Maley	18 – 1 September 1998	1.85 m (6 ft 1 in)	Oregon Ducks	(United States)
F	12	Rebecca Pizzey	18 – 27 January 1999	1.85 m (6 ft 1 in)	Dandenong Rangers	(Australia)
C	13	Eziyoda Magbegor	17 – 13 August 1999	1.94 m (6 ft 4 in)	Canberra Capitals	(Australia)
F	14	Lara McSpadden	18 – 2 April 1999	1.93 m (6 ft 4 in)	Sydney Uni Flames	(Australia)
F	15	Zitina Aokuso	18 – 23 November 1998	1.92 m (6 ft 4 in)	Townsville Fire	(Australia)

Head coach

- (Australia) Deanne Butler

Assistant coach(es)

- (Australia) Phil Brown
- (Australia) Alan McAughtry

Legend

- Club – describes current
  club as of tournament
- Age – describes age
  on 22 July 2017

=== Hungary ===
Hungary women's national under-19 basketball team roster
Players
Coaches

Pos.	No.	Name	Age – Date of birth	Height	Club	Ctr.
G	1	Petra Pusztai	18 – 27 April 1999	1.78 m (5 ft 10 in)	ELTE–BEAC Újbuda	(Hungary)
F	4	Dalma Czukor	18 – 29 March 1999	1.82 m (6 ft 0 in)	UNIQA Sopron	(Hungary)
G	5	Veronika Kanyasi	18 – 27 May 1999	1.74 m (5 ft 9 in)	Ceglédi EKK	(Hungary)
G	9	Réka Lelik	18 – 14 April 1999	1.80 m (5 ft 11 in)	ELTE–BEAC Újbuda	(Hungary)
G	11	Dorka Boros	18 – 11 July 1999	1.74 m (5 ft 9 in)	ELTE–BEAC Újbuda	(Hungary)
G	12	Livia Gereben	17 – 5 November 1999	1.81 m (5 ft 11 in)	Atomerőmű KSC Szekszárd	(Hungary)
G	13	Kamilla Varga	18 – 13 April 1999	1.72 m (5 ft 8 in)	UNIQA Sopron	(Hungary)
F	14	Dorka Juhász	17 – 18 December 1999	1.91 m (6 ft 3 in)	PEAC-Pécs	(Hungary)
F	24	Kira Karagits	17 – 4 November 1999	1.80 m (5 ft 11 in)	ELTE–BEAC Újbuda	(Hungary)
G	30	Panka Dul	16 – 23 October 2000	1.77 m (5 ft 10 in)	Vasas Akadémia	(Hungary)
F	31	Beatrix Meresz	17 – 18 December 1999	1.85 m (6 ft 1 in)	Vasas Akadémia	(Hungary)
F	33	Agnes Torok	19 – 23 January 1998	1.83 m (6 ft 0 in)	UNI Győr	(Hungary)

Head coach

- (Hungary) Judith Balogh

Assistant coach(es)

- (Hungary) David Gaspar
- (Hungary) Dalma Ivanyi

Legend

- Club – describes current
  club as of tournament
- Age – describes age
  on 22 July 2017

=== Japan ===
Japan women's national under-19 basketball team roster
Players
Coaches

Pos.	No.	Name	Age – Date of birth	Height	Club	Ctr.
F	4	Miki Sasaka	19 – 31 January 1998	1.78 m (5 ft 10 in)	Hakuoh	(Japan)
G	5	Satsuki Shibuya	19 – 8 February 1998	1.67 m (5 ft 6 in)	Waseda	(Japan)
G	6	Izumi Abe	18 – 8 January 1999	1.67 m (5 ft 6 in)	Tokyo	(Japan)
G	7	Moeka Era	19 – 30 June 1998	1.70 m (5 ft 7 in)	Aisin AW Wings	(Japan)
C	8	Kadysha Umezawa	18 – 26 July 1998	1.88 m (6 ft 2 in)	JX-ENEOS Sunflowers	(Japan)
C	9	Miwa Kuribayashi	18 – 26 August 1998	1.87 m (6 ft 2 in)	Fujitsu Red Wave	(Japan)
F	10	Himawari Akaho	18 – 28 August 1998	1.83 m (6 ft 0 in)	Denso Iris	(Japan)
F	11	Kiho Miyashita	18 – 6 October 1998	1.78 m (5 ft 10 in)	Aisin AW Wings	(Japan)
F	12	Stephanie Mawuli	18 – 25 November 1998	1.81 m (5 ft 11 in)	Toyota Antelopes	(Japan)
G	13	Haruna Kasagi	18 – 21 February 1999	1.67 m (5 ft 6 in)	Denso Iris	(Japan)
G	14	Haruki Takahara	18 – 13 March 1999	1.73 m (5 ft 8 in)	Aisin AW Wings	(Japan)
G	15	Ayumi Fujita	18 – 30 March 1999	1.65 m (5 ft 5 in)	Takushoku	(Japan)

Head coach

- (Japan) Mikiko Hagiwara

Assistant coach(es)

- (Japan) Mayumi Tomiyama

Legend

- Club – describes current
  club as of tournament
- Age – describes age
  on 22 July 2017

=== Mexico ===
Mexico women's national under-19 basketball team roster
Players
Coaches

Pos.	No.	Name	Age – Date of birth	Height	Club	Ctr.
F	4	Zaira Alvarado	19 – 2 June 1998	1.79 m (5 ft 10 in)	UPAEP	(Mexico)
G	5	Ornella Rivera	18 – 11 September 1998	1.73 m (5 ft 8 in)	INST	(Mexico)
G	6	Valeria Tapia	18 – 21 September 1998	1.65 m (5 ft 5 in)	High Joseph AC	(United States)
G	7	Carlota Martin del Campo	19 – 2 April 1998	1.59 m (5 ft 3 in)	UACH	(Mexico)
G	8	Abdi Xicotencatl	18 – 16 October 1998	1.63 m (5 ft 4 in)	UVM	(Mexico)
G	9	Diana Villalobos	19 – 6 March 1998	1.68 m (5 ft 6 in)	ITESM	(Mexico)
F	10	Daniela Sanchez	19 – 24 May 1998	1.80 m (5 ft 11 in)	ITESM	(Mexico)
C	11	Patricia Ayala	18 – 23 February 1999	1.81 m (5 ft 11 in)	LaSalle	(Mexico)
C	12	Itzel Figueroa	18 – 15 September 1998	1.80 m (5 ft 11 in)	CETYS	(Mexico)
G	13	Gabriela Rosas	18 – 27 April 1999	1.76 m (5 ft 9 in)	Orangewood AC	(United States)
F	14	Alexia Gonzalez	19 – 24 April 1998	1.70 m (5 ft 7 in)	UMAD	(Mexico)
C	15	Maria Gastelum	18 – 12 May 1999	1.92 m (6 ft 4 in)	Col Occidente	(Mexico)

Head coach

- (Mexico) Oswaldo Zermeno

Assistant coach(es)

- (Mexico) Viridiana Melendrez
- (Mexico) Rigoberto Palomares

Legend

- Club – describes current
  club as of tournament
- Age – describes age
  on 22 July 2017
