= 2017 FIBA Under-19 Women's Basketball World Cup =

Sports competition

Tournament details
- Host country: Italy
- Cities: Udine, Cividale del Friuli
- Dates: 22–30 July
- Teams: 16 (from 5 confederations)
- Venue: 2 (in 2 host cities)

Final positions
- Champions: Russia (1st title)

Tournament statistics
- MVP: (Russia) Maria Vadeeva
- Top scorer: (Russia) Vadeeva (18.4)
- Top rebounds: (Russia) Vadeeva (14.0)
- Top assists: (China) Wang (7.6)
- PPG (Team): United States (84.1)
- RPG (Team): Russia (56.6)
- APG (Team): Russia (25.7)

Official website
- www.fiba.basketball

The 2017 FIBA Under-19 Women's Basketball World Cup (Italian: Campionato mondiale di basket femminile Under 19 FIBA 2017) was hosted by Italy from 22 to 30 July 2017.

Russia won their first title (or third if the Soviet Union is included) by defeating the United States 86–82 in the final. The bronze medal went to Canada who defeated Japan 67–60.

== Venues ==
Udine	Cividale del Friuli	2017 FIBA Under-19 Women's Basketball World Cup is located in Italy
Palasport Primo Carnera	Palasport Longobardo	2017 FIBA Under-19 Women's Basketball World Cup is located in Italy
Capacity: 3,300	Capacity: 3,500	2017 FIBA Under-19 Women's Basketball World Cup is located in Italy

== Qualified teams ==
Means of Qualification	Dates	Venue	Berths	Qualifiers
Host Nation			1	Italy
2016 FIBA Americas Under-18 Championship for Women	13–17 July 2016	Chile	4	United States; Canada; Puerto Rico; Mexico*
2016 FIBA Europe Under-18 Championship for Women	23–31 July 2016	Hungary	5	France; Spain; Russia; Latvia; Hungary
2016 FIBA Africa Under-18 Championship for Women	26 August – 4 September 2016	Egypt	2	Mali; Egypt
2016 FIBA Asia Under-18 Championship for Women	13–20 November 2016	Thailand	3	China; Japan; South Korea
2016 FIBA Oceania Under-18 Championship for Women	5–10 December 2016	Fiji	1	Australia
Total			16	

* Brazil qualified for the tournament but was suspended by FIBA. A fourth team from FIBA Americas had to be named to take Brazil's place. The draw took place with the fourth FIBA Americas team's identity yet to be named. On 12 May 2017, Mexico was chosen to replace Brazil.

== Preliminary round ==
The draw for the tournament was held on 1 February 2017 in Udine, Italy.

All times are local (UTC+2).

=== Group A ===
Pos	Team	Pld	W	L	PF	PA	PD	Pts
1	United States	3	3	0	252	158	+94	6
2	China	3	2	1	197	208	−11	5
3	Italy	3	1	2	175	194	−19	4
4	Mali	3	0	3	166	230	−64	3

Source: FIBA
Rules for classification: 1) Points; 2) Head-to-head results; 3) Points difference; 4) Points scored.

22 July 2017
18:30

Boxscore

Mali	58–95	United States
Scoring by quarter: 14–23, 18–25, 13–27, 13–20
Pts: Coulibaly 13; Rebs: Coulibaly 6 Asts: Coulibaly 3		Pts: Sutton 19; Rebs: Holmes 10; Asts: three players 4

Palasport Primo Carnera, Udine
Referees: Christine Vuong (CAN), Vivian García (URU), Ryan Jones (NZL)

22 July 2017
20:45

Boxscore

China	74–63	Italy
Scoring by quarter: 21–10, 14–15, 22–20, 17–18
Pts: Tang 18; Rebs: Han 13; Asts: Li 7		Pts: Andre 18; Rebs: Madera 7 Asts: Pinzan 4

Palasport Primo Carnera, Udine
Referees: Natalia Cuello (DOM), Viola Györgyi (NOR), Jelena Smiljanić (SRB)

23 July 2017
18:00

Boxscore

United States	91–51	China
Scoring by quarter: 28–10, 20–5, 25–23, 18–13
Pts: Holmes 14; Rebs: Hebard 9 Asts: Dangerfield 4		Pts: Wang 14; Rebs: three players 6 Asts: Wang 4

Palasport Longobardo, Cividale del Friuli
Referees: Fernando Calatrava (ESP), Ryan Jones (NZL), Joyce Muchenu (ZIM)

23 July 2017
20:15

Boxscore

Italy	63–54	Mali
Scoring by quarter: 19–8, 12–14, 17–14, 15–18
Pts: Cubaj, Fassina 15; Rebs: Fassina 12; Asts: Fassina 6		Pts: Coulibaly 16; Rebs: Coulibaly 11; Asts: Sissoko 8

Palasport Longobardo, Cividale del Friuli
Referees: Krishna Domínguez (MEX), Mauricio Chinchilla (CRC), Sarty Nghixulifwa (NAM)

25 July 2017
20:45

Boxscore

United States	66–49	Italy
Scoring by quarter: 12–13, 12–8, 28–18, 14–10
Pts: Dangerfield 11; Rebs: Holmes 14; Asts: Dangerfield 9		Pts: Cubaj 9 Rebs: Cubaj 5 Asts: G.Togliani 4

Palasport Primo Carnera, Udine
Referees: Mykola Ambrosov (UKR), Ryan Jones (NZL), Vasiliki Tsaroucha (GRE)

25 July 2017
20:45

Boxscore

China	72–54	Mali
Scoring by quarter: 25–9, 16–15, 14–11, 17–19
Pts: Han 23; Rebs: Han 12; Asts: Wang 12		Pts: As. Diakité 18; Rebs: Sangaré 8 Asts: Doumbia 4

Palasport Longobardo, Cividale del Friuli
Referees: Saulius Racys (SWE), Vivian García (URU), Milan Nedović (SLO)

=== Group B ===
Pos	Team	Pld	W	L	PF	PA	PD	Pts
1	Russia	3	3	0	276	171	+105	6
2	Spain	3	2	1	220	190	+30	5
3	Egypt	3	1	2	203	254	−51	4
4	Puerto Rico	3	0	3	144	228	−84	3

Source: FIBA
Rules for classification: 1) Points; 2) Head-to-head results; 3) Points difference; 4) Points scored.

22 July 2017
18:00

Boxscore

Russia	114–63	Egypt
Scoring by quarter: 24–12, 38–24, 31–13, 21–24
Pts: Kornienko, Musina 18; Rebs: Musina 12; Asts: Musina 6		Pts: Abdelfattah 24; Rebs: Abdelfattah 6 Asts: Abdelfattah 5

Palasport Longobardo, Cividale del Friuli
Referees: Gina Cross (USA), Sarah Carey (AUS), Park Kyoung-jin (KOR)

22 July 2017
20:15

Boxscore

Puerto Rico	42–74	Spain
Scoring by quarter: 16–12, 13–24, 4–15, 9–23
Pts: Rodríguez 19; Rebs: Pagan 11; Asts: Pérez 7		Pts: Diallo 12; Rebs: Junio 11; Asts: Four players 3

Palasport Longobardo, Cividale del Friuli
Referees: Yohan Rosso (FRA), Sarty Nghixulifwa (NAM), Zhang Xiao (CHN)

23 July 2017
18:30

Boxscore

Egypt	69–52	Puerto Rico
Scoring by quarter: 17–14, 16–18, 22–9, 14–11
Pts: Abdelgawad 22; Rebs: Sherif 10; Asts: Ghonim 5		Pts: Oppenheimer 20; Rebs: Pérez, Rodríguez 7 Asts: Pérez 7

Palasport Primo Carnera, Udine
Referees: Saulius Racys (SWE), Shoko Suguro (JPN), Vasiliki Tsaroucha (GRE)

23 July 2017
20:45

Boxscore

Spain	58–77	Russia
Scoring by quarter: 13–25, 10–12, 15–17, 20–23
Pts: Erauncetamurguil 11; Rebs: three players 4 Asts: Erauncetamurguil, Etxarri 3		Pts: Musina 18; Rebs: Vadeeva 15; Asts: Zavialova 8

Palasport Primo Carnera, Udine
Referees: Natalia Cuello (DOM), Gina Cross (USA), Zhang Xiao (CHN)

25 July 2017
18:30

Boxscore

Puerto Rico	50–85	Russia
Scoring by quarter: 0–20, 9–15, 25–24, 16–26
Pts: Rodríguez 13; Rebs: Vargas 4 Asts: Pérez 7		Pts: Kornienko 15; Rebs: Musina 15; Asts: Musina 5

Palasport Longobardo, Cividale del Friuli
Referees: Fernando Calatrava (ESP), Sarah Carey (AUS), Micaela Prado (ARG)

25 July 2017
18:30

Boxscore

Egypt	71–88	Spain
Scoring by quarter: 17–22, 25–17, 16–25, 13–24
Pts: Abdelgawad, Ghonim 23; Rebs: Ghonim 7 Asts: Abdelgawad 8		Pts: Iparragirre 16; Rebs: three players 6 Asts: Alonso 7

Palasport Primo Carnera, Udine
Referees: Christine Vuong (CAN), Joyce Muchenu (ZIM), Michele Rossi (ITA)

=== Group C ===
Pos	Team	Pld	W	L	PF	PA	PD	Pts
1	Canada	3	3	0	219	160	+59	6
2	France	3	2	1	177	167	+10	5
3	Latvia	3	1	2	199	204	−5	4
4	South Korea	3	0	3	159	223	−64	3

Source: FIBA
Rules for classification: 1) Points; 2) Head-to-head results; 3) Points difference; 4) Points scored.

22 July 2017
14:00

Boxscore

Canada	91–45	South Korea
Scoring by quarter: 12–11, 26–11, 31–8, 22–15
Pts: Six players 10; Rebs: Brown 13; Asts: Amihere, Epoch 3		Pts: Park J. 13; Rebs: Park J. 4 Asts: Park J. 3

Palasport Primo Carnera, Udine
Referees: Fernando Calatrava (ESP), Kendell Henry (ISV), Nadege Zouzou (CIV)

22 July 2017
16:15

Boxscore

Latvia	60–69	France
Scoring by quarter: 9–11, 12–25, 19–12, 20–21
Pts: Mote 17; Rebs: Rozentāle, Strautmane 8 Asts: Rozentāle 2		Pts: Kerboeuf 21; Rebs: Djaldi-Tabdi 12; Asts: Limouzin 5

Palasport Primo Carnera, Udine
Referees: Milan Nedović (SLO), Krishna Domínguez (MEX), Joyce Muchenu (ZIM)

23 July 2017
13:30

Boxscore

South Korea	61–69	Latvia
Scoring by quarter: 12–11, 22–21, 12–23, 15–14
Pts: Na 23; Rebs: Kim M. 8 Asts: Lee S., Park J. 4		Pts: Strautmane 17; Rebs: Rozentāle 13; Asts: Strautmane 5

Palasport Longobardo, Cividale del Friuli
Referees: Christine Vuong (CAN), Vivian García (URU), Ricardo Hayles (JAM)

23 July 2017
15:45

Boxscore

France	45–54	Canada
Scoring by quarter: 13–11, 8–15, 15–15, 9–13
Pts: Foppossi, Sissoko 12; Rebs: Sissoko 8 Asts: three players 2		Pts: Brown 17; Rebs: Amihere 11; Asts: Konig 8

Palasport Longobardo, Cividale del Friuli
Referees: Mykola Ambrosov (UKR), Viola Györgyi (NOR), Michele Rossi (ITA)

25 July 2017
16:15

Boxscore

Canada	74–70	Latvia
Scoring by quarter: 19–21, 10–12, 26–15, 19–22
Pts: Konig 32; Rebs: Brown 14; Asts: Jerome 6		Pts: Pāvelsone 19; Rebs: Rozentāle 8 Asts: Pāvelsone 4

Palasport Longobardo, Cividale del Friuli
Referees: Yohan Rosso (FRA), Park Kyoung-jin (KOR), Jelena Smiljanić (SRB)

25 July 2017
16:15

Boxscore

France	63–53	South Korea
Scoring by quarter: 13–12, 24–9, 15–17, 11–15
Pts: Michaud, Pouye 11; Rebs: Djekoundade 11; Asts: Pouye 5		Pts: Na 20; Rebs: Kim D. 5 Asts: Park J. 4

Palasport Primo Carnera, Udine
Referees: Viola Györgyi (NOR), Ricardo Hayles (JAM), Kendell Henry (ISV)

=== Group D ===
Pos	Team	Pld	W	L	PF	PA	PD	Pts
1	Japan	3	3	0	225	172	+53	6
2	Australia	3	2	1	245	151	+94	5
3	Hungary	3	1	2	221	210	+11	4
4	Mexico	3	0	3	153	311	−158	3

Source: FIBA
Rules for classification: 1) Points; 2) Head-to-head results; 3) Points difference; 4) Points scored.

22 July 2017
13:30

Boxscore

Australia	61–66	Japan
Scoring by quarter: 13–13, 15–18, 20–13, 13–22
Pts: Magbegor 21; Rebs: Maley 13; Asts: three players 3		Pts: Takahara 12; Rebs: Kuribayashi, Umezawa 6 Asts: Fujita, Takahara 4

Palasport Longobardo, Cividale del Friuli
Referees: Mykola Ambrosov (UKR), Mauricio Chinchilla (CRC), Vasiliki Tsaroucha (GRE)

22 July 2017
15:45

Boxscore

Hungary	111–67	Mexico
Scoring by quarter: 25–11, 21–13, 34–24, 31–19
Pts: Gereben 20; Rebs: Juhász 15; Asts: Kányási, Lelik 5		Pts: Sanchez 16; Rebs: Rivera 6 Asts: Rivera 5

Palasport Longobardo, Cividale del Friuli
Referees: Saulius Racys (SWE), Ricardo Hayles (JAM), Shoko Suguro (JPN)

23 July 2017
14:00

Boxscore

Japan	68–59	Hungary
Scoring by quarter: 11–17, 17–10, 17–17, 23–15
Pts: Mawuli 13; Rebs: Mawuli 9 Asts: Fujita 8		Pts: Juhász 16; Rebs: Torok 9 Asts: Kányási 7

Palasport Primo Carnera, Udine
Referees: Milan Nedović (SLO), Sarah Carey (AUS), Park Kyoung-jin (KOR)

23 July 2017
16:15

Boxscore

Mexico	34–109	Australia
Scoring by quarter: 9–25, 8–26, 10–33, 7–25
Pts: Villalobos 14; Rebs: Alvarado, Sánchez 5 Asts: five players 1		Pts: Simons 17; Rebs: Maley 9 Asts: Rocci 7

Palasport Primo Carnera, Udine
Referees: Yohan Rosso (FRA), Micaela Prado (ARG), Jelena Smiljanić (SRB)

25 July 2017
14:00

Boxscore

Hungary	51–75	Australia
Scoring by quarter: 8–18, 17–12, 15–22, 11–23
Pts: Lelik 10; Rebs: Juhász, Torok 7 Asts: Pusztai, Torok 3		Pts: Magbegor 18; Rebs: Magbegor, Maley 10; Asts: Shelley 5

Palasport Primo Carnera, Udine
Referees: Gina Cross (USA), Krishna Domínguez (MEX), Sarty Nghixulifwa (NAM)

25 July 2017
14:00

Boxscore

Japan	91–52	Mexico
Scoring by quarter: 26–13, 15–13, 22–18, 28–8
Pts: Mawuli, Umezawa 14; Rebs: Umezawa 13; Asts: Shibuya 7		Pts: González 14; Rebs: Gastelum 9 Asts: González 3

Palasport Longobardo, Cividale del Friuli
Referees: Natalia Cuello (DOM), Mauricio Chinchilla (CRC), Nadege Zouzou (CIV)

== Knockout stage ==
=== Bracket ===
Round of 16
26 July
United States	104
Puerto Rico	46
26 July
France	73
Hungary	58
26 July
Italy	49
Spain	59
26 July
South Korea	47
Japan	86
26 July
China	85
Egypt	43
26 July
Canada	64
Mexico	43
26 July
Mali	66
Russia	90
26 July
Latvia	56
Australia	61

Quarter-finals
28 July
United States	78
France	51
28 July
Spain	71
Japan	95
28 July
China	65
Canada	68
28 July
Russia	67
Australia	65

Semi-finals
29 July
United States	73
Japan	66
29 July
Canada	41
Russia	65

Final
30 July
United States	82
Russia	86
Third place
30 July
Japan	60
Canada	67

5–8th place bracket

5–8th place semifinals
29 July
France	55
Spain	53
29 July
China	64
Australia	70

Fifth place
30 July
France	47
Australia	45
Seventh place
30 July
Spain	56
China	74

9–16th place bracket

9–16th place quarterfinals
28 July
Puerto Rico	46
Hungary	90
28 July
Italy	78
South Korea	59
28 July
Egypt	66
Mexico	70
28 July
Mali	46
Latvia	60

9–12th place semifinals
29 July
Hungary	73
Italy	65
29 July
Mexico	66
Latvia	84

Ninth place
30 July
Hungary	75
Latvia	61
Eleventh place
30 July
Italy	72
Mexico	54

13–16th place bracket

13–16th place semifinals
29 July
Puerto Rico	77
South Korea	72
29 July
Egypt	56
Mali	85

13th place
30 July
Puerto Rico	58
Mali	61
15th place
30 July
South Korea	74
Egypt	57

=== Round of 16 ===
26 July 2017
13:30

Boxscore

South Korea	47–86	Japan
Scoring by quarter: 18–22, 7–19, 14–21, 8–24
Pts: Lee J. 12; Rebs: Cha 6 Asts: Kim M., Lee J. 2		Pts: Akaho, Sasaka 12; Rebs: Kuribayashi 10; Asts: Kuribayashi, Takahara 4

Palasport Longobardo, Cividale del Friuli
Referees: Milan Nedović (SLO), Zhang Xiao (CHN), Kendell Henry (ISV)

26 July 2017
14:00

Boxscore

Canada	64–43	Mexico
Scoring by quarter: 22–5, 21–13, 16–5, 5–20
Pts: Jerome 12; Rebs: three players 7 Asts: Konig 5		Pts: González 12; Rebs: González 6 Asts: Villalobos 3

Palasport Primo Carnera, Udine
Referees: Ryan Jones (NZL), Sarah Carey (AUS), Shoko Sugoro (JPN)

26 July 2017
15:45

Boxscore

France	73–58	Hungary
Scoring by quarter: 18–17, 18–9, 17–20, 20–12
Pts: Pouye 20; Rebs: Djaldi-Tabdi 9 Asts: Pouye 5		Pts: Juhász 20; Rebs: Juhász 10; Asts: Lelik 7

Palasport Longobardo, Cividale del Friuli
Referees: Natalia Cuello (DOM), Saulius Racys (SWE), Michele Rossi (ITA)

26 July 2017
16:15

Boxscore

Latvia	56–61	Australia
Scoring by quarter: 13–8, 9–18, 14–13, 20–22
Pts: Mote 16; Rebs: Strautmane 12; Asts: Grabe, Strautmane 5		Pts: Magbegor 17; Rebs: Magbegor, Maley 10; Asts: Rocci 6

Palasport Primo Carnera, Udine
Referees: Mykola Ambrosov (UKR), Jelena Smiljanić (SRB), Vasiliki Tsaroucha (GRE)

26 July 2017
18:00

Boxscore

United States	104–46	Puerto Rico
Scoring by quarter: 31–10, 23–12, 22–10, 28–14
Pts: Hebard 21; Rebs: Holmes 11; Asts: Harris 10		Pts: Oppenheimer 13; Rebs: Vargas 7 Asts: Pérez 5

Palasport Longobardo, Cividale del Friuli
Referees: Christine Vuong (CAN), Ricardo Hayles (JAM), Nadege Zouzou (CIV)

26 July 2017
18:30

Boxscore

Mali	66–90	Russia
Scoring by quarter: 12–29, 13–24, 27–17, 14–20
Pts: Coulibaly 15; Rebs: As. Diakité 6 Asts: Doumbia 5		Pts: Vadeeva 22; Rebs: Vadeeva 23; Asts: Zavialova 7

Palasport Primo Carnera, Udine
Referees: Fernando Calatrava (ESP), Mauricio Chinchilla (CRC), Joyce Muchenu (ZIM)

26 July 2017
20:15

Boxscore

China	85–43	Egypt
Scoring by quarter: 18–6, 23–7, 32–11, 12–19
Pts: Han 14; Rebs: Han 13; Asts: Wang 8		Pts: Sherif 12; Rebs: Sherif 9 Asts: Bakr 2

Palasport Longobardo, Cividale del Friuli
Referees: Gina Cross (USA), Park Kyoung-jin (KOR), Micaela Prado (ARG)

26 July 2017
20:45

Boxscore

Italy	49–59	Spain
Scoring by quarter: 12–10, 9–19, 10–14, 18–16
Pts: Andre 13; Rebs: Cubaj 6 Asts: Cubaj 6		Pts: Barneda 14; Rebs: Ginzo 7 Asts: Pena 5

Palasport Primo Carnera, Udine
Referees: Yohan Rosso (FRA), Krishna Domínguez (MEX), Viola Györgyi (NOR)

=== 9–16th place quarterfinals ===
28 July 2017
12:00

Boxscore

Puerto Rico	46–90	Hungary
Scoring by quarter: 18–18, 8–25, 9–28, 11–19
Pts: Pagan 17; Rebs: Pagan 6 Asts: Pérez 6		Pts: Kányási 17; Rebs: Czukor, Mérész 9 Asts: Boros 7

Palasport Longobardo, Cividale del Friuli
Referees: Fernando Calatrava (ESP), Shoko Suguro (JPN), Nadege Zouzou (CIV)

28 July 2017
14:15

Boxscore

Egypt	66–70	Mexico
Scoring by quarter: 22–17, 12–9, 11–26
Pts: Bakr 16; Rebs: Sherif 10; Asts: Abdelgawad 8		Pts: González 27; Rebs: González 8 Asts: Tapia 8

Palasport Longobardo, Cividale del Friuli
Referees: Vasiliki Tsarocuha (GRE), Vivian García (URU), Zhang Xiao (CHN)

28 July 2017
16:30

Boxscore

Mali	46–60	Latvia
Scoring by quarter: 15–16, 11–16, 9–15, 11–13
Pts: Coulibaly 11; Rebs: Coulibaly 11; Asts: Drame 4		Pts: Strautmane 13; Rebs: Rozentāle 9 Asts: Gertsone 4

Palasport Longobardo, Cividale del Friuli
Referees: Krishna Domínguez (MEX), Kendell Henry (ISV), Micaela Prado (ARG)

28 July 2017
18:45

Boxscore

Italy	78–59	South Korea
Scoring by quarter: 22–17, 18–11, 20–15, 18–16
Pts: Andre 21; Rebs: four players 6 Asts: Fassina 5		Pts: Na 17; Rebs: Lee J. 8 Asts: four players 3

Palasport Longobardo, Cividale del Friuli
Referees: Milan Nedović (SLO), Ricardo Hayles (JAM), Sarty Nghixulifwa (NAM)

=== Quarterfinals ===
28 July 2017
13:30

Boxscore

Russia	67–65	Australia
Scoring by quarter: 15–10, 7–15, 25–13, 20–27
Pts: Vadeeva 28; Rebs: Vadeeva 14; Asts: Zavialova 7		Pts: Shelley 26; Rebs: Maley 13; Asts: Conti 8

Palasport Primo Carnera, Udine
Referees: Yohan Rosso (FRA), Ryan Jones (NZL), Saulius Racys (SWE)

28 July 2017
16:00

Boxscore

China	65–68	Canada
Scoring by quarter: 21–10, 7–16, 17–22, 20–20
Pts: Wang 21; Rebs: Han 14; Asts: Jia, Wang 7		Pts: Amihere 21; Rebs: Brown 13; Asts: Hall 7

Palasport Primo Carnera, Udine
Referees: Gina Cross (USA), Joyce Muchenu (ZIM), Michele Rossi (ITA)

28 July 2017
18:30

Boxscore

Spain	71–95	Japan
Scoring by quarter: 13–21, 12–25, 20–26, 26–23
Pts: Barneda 13; Rebs: Barneda 7 Asts: Pena 6		Pts: Miyashita, Takahara 15; Rebs: Mawuli 11; Asts: Miyashita, Shibuya 4

Palasport Primo Carnera, Udine
Referees: Mykola Ambrosov (UKR), Sarah Carey (AUS), Christine Vuong (CAN)

28 July 2017
21:00

Boxscore

United States	78–51	France
Scoring by quarter: 18–18, 12–4, 25–18, 23–11
Pts: Carter 18; Rebs: Hebard 7 Asts: Harris 6		Pts: Pouye 15; Rebs: Djaldi-Tabdi 8 Asts: Limouzin 5

Palasport Primo Carnera, Udine
Referees: Natalia Cuello (DOM), Mauricio Chinchilla (CRC), Viola Györgyi (NOR)

=== 13–16th place semifinals ===
29 July 2017
12:00

Boxscore

Egypt	56–85	Mali
Scoring by quarter: 4–15, 13–22, 15–22, 24–26
Pts: Sherif 19; Rebs: Sherif 10; Asts: four players 2		Pts: Coulibaly 22; Rebs: As. Diakité 12; Asts: Am. Diakité 7

Palasport Longobardo, Cividale del Friuli
Referees: Ricardo Hayles (JAM), Vivian García (URU), Shoko Suguro (JPN)

29 July 2017
14:15

Boxscore

Puerto Rico	77–72	South Korea
Scoring by quarter: 22–22, 17–16, 19–13, 19–21
Pts: Pagan 26; Rebs: Pagan 15; Asts: Pérez 11		Pts: Park J. 24; Rebs: Lee J. 9 Asts: Lee S. 5

Palasport Longobardo, Cividale del Friuli
Referees: Gina Cross (USA), Joyce Muchenu (ZIM), Zhang Xiao (CHN)

=== 9–12th place semifinals ===
29 July 2017
16:30

Boxscore

Mexico	66–84	Latvia
Scoring by quarter: 11–31, 18–22, 24–18, 13–13
Pts: González 19; Rebs: González 6 Asts: Rivera 5		Pts: Strautmane 28; Rebs: Lipe, Strautmane 6 Asts: Gertsone 7

Palasport Longobardo, Cividale del Friuli
Referees: Fernando Calatrava (ESP), Park Kyoung-jin (KOR), Micaela Prado (ARG)

29 July 2017
18:45

Boxscore

Hungary	73–65	Italy
Scoring by quarter: 18–9, 19–17, 16–28, 20–11
Pts: Gereben 24; Rebs: Juhász 14; Asts: Pusztai 10		Pts: Cubaj 22; Rebs: Cubaj 13; Asts: Fassina 5

Palasport Longobardo, Cividale del Friuli
Referees: Mykola Ambrosov (UKR), Sarah Carey (AUS), Kendell Henry (ISV)

=== 5–8th place semifinals ===
29 July 2017
13:30

Boxscore

China	64–70	Australia
Scoring by quarter: 13–16, 19–14, 16–21, 16–19
Pts: Han 21; Rebs: Han 14; Asts: Wang 8		Pts: Magbegor 27; Rebs: Magbegor 10; Asts: Conti 6

Palasport Primo Carnera, Udine
Referees: Christine Vuong (CAN), Sarty Nghixulifwa (NAM), Jelena Smiljanić (SRB)

29 July 2017
16:00

Boxscore

France	55–53	Spain
Scoring by quarter: 12–15, 15–11, 14–15, 14–12
Pts: Sissoko 14; Rebs: Djaldi-Tabdi 8 Asts: Pouye 4		Pts: Alonso, Junio 12; Rebs: Ginzo 16; Asts: four players 3

Palasport Primo Carnera, Udine
Referees: Natalia Cuello (DOM), Ryan Jones (NZL), Michele Rossi (ITA)

=== Semifinals ===
29 July 2017
18:30

Boxscore

Canada	41–65	Russia
Scoring by quarter: 10–20, 7–23, 7–13, 17–9
Pts: Brown 7 Rebs: Amihere 8 Asts: Jerome, Van Leeuwen 2		Pts: Musina 22; Rebs: Musina 16; Asts: Cheren, Safonova 4

Palasport Primo Carnera, Udine
Referees: Viola Györgyi (NOR), Krishna Domínguez (MEX), Saulius Racys (SWE)

29 July 2017
21:00

Boxscore

United States	73–66	Japan
Scoring by quarter: 24–22, 23–11, 18–10, 8–23
Pts: Hebard 24; Rebs: Hebard 14; Asts: Harris 6		Pts: Sasaka 16; Rebs: Akaho, Mawuli 6 Asts: Fujita 6

Palasport Primo Carnera, Udine
Referees: Yohan Rosso (FRA), Milan Nedović (SLO), Vasiliki Tsaroucha (GRE)

=== 15th place game ===
30 July 2017
11:00

Boxscore

South Korea	74–57	Egypt
Scoring by quarter: 14–11, 16–17, 24–19, 20–10
Pts: Park J. 27; Rebs: Park J. 13; Asts: Park J. 5		Pts: Abdelgawad 16; Rebs: Sherif 13; Asts: Abdelgawad 9

Palasport Longobardo, Cividale del Friuli
Referees: Kendell Henry (ISV), Mauricio Chinchilla (CRC), Zhang Xiao (CHN)

=== 13th place game ===
30 July 2017
13:15

Boxscore

Puerto Rico	58–61	Mali
Scoring by quarter: 18–14, 15–13, 14–12, 11–22
Pts: Pagan 19; Rebs: Pagan, Rodriguez 10; Asts: Perez 9		Pts: Sissoko 12; Rebs: Dembele 11; Asts: Sissoko 8

Palasport Longobardo, Cividale del Friuli
Referees: Saulius Racys (SWE), Micaela Prado (ARG), Jelena Smiljanić (SRB)

=== Eleventh place game ===
30 July 2017
15:30

Boxscore

Italy	72–54	Mexico
Scoring by quarter: 21–13, 21–14, 14–13, 16–14
Pts: Fassina 17; Rebs: Parmesani 8 Asts: Ianezic 8		Pts: Sanchez 15; Rebs: Xicotencatl 7 Asts: Rivera 5

Palasport Longobardo, Cividale del Friuli
Referees: Vasiliki Tsaroucha (GRE), Joyce Muchenu (ZIM), Nadege Zouzou (CIV)

=== Ninth place game ===
30 July 2017
17:45

Boxscore

Hungary	75–61	Latvia
Scoring by quarter: 16–24, 18–14, 27–11, 14–12
Pts: Mérész 16; Rebs: Juhász 7 Asts: Kányási, Lelik 7		Pts: Hudjakova 17; Rebs: Rozentāle 9 Asts: three players 4

Palasport Longobardo, Cividale del Friuli
Referees: Natalia Cuello (DOM), Ricardo Hayles (JAM), Sarty Nghixulifwa (NAM)

=== Seventh place game ===
30 July 2017
13:30

Boxscore

Spain	56–74	China
Scoring by quarter: 16–17, 14–15, 14–15, 12–27
Pts: Ginzo 13; Rebs: Ginzo 8 Asts: Ayuso, Etxarri 4		Pts: Han, Li 18; Rebs: Han 9 Asts: Wang 8

Palasport Primo Carnera, Udine
Referees: Milan Nedović (SLO), Sarah Carey (AUS), Park Kyoung-jin (KOR)

=== Fifth place game ===
30 July 2017
16:00

Boxscore

France	47–45	Australia
Scoring by quarter: 7–14, 18–13, 11–12, 11–6
Pts: Djaldi-Tabdi 10; Rebs: Kerboeuf 9 Asts: Kerboeuf 6		Pts: Bibby 11; Rebs: Bibby 13; Asts: Shelley 5

Palasport Primo Carnera, Udine
Referees: Viola Györgyi (NOR), Fernando Calatrava (ESP), Michele Rossi (ITA)

=== Bronze medal match ===
30 July 2017
18:30

Boxscore

Japan	60–67	Canada
Scoring by quarter: 10–14, 17–19, 18–17, 15–17
Pts: Akaho, Takahara 13; Rebs: Akaho 10; Asts: Shibuya, Umezawa 3		Pts: Amihere 13; Rebs: Amihere 10; Asts: Hall, van Leeuwen 4

Palasport Primo Carnera, Udine
Referees: Gina Cross (USA), Ryan Jones (NZL), Yohan Rosso (FRA)

=== Final ===
30 July 2017
21:00

Boxscore

United States	82–86	Russia
Scoring by quarter: 22–17, 20–19, 18–26, 22–24
Pts: Carter 31; Rebs: Alarie 12; Asts: Harris 9		Pts: Musina 33; Rebs: Vadeeva 18; Asts: Zavialova 8

Palasport Primo Carnera, Udine
Referees: Mykola Ambrosov (UKR), Krishna Domínguez (MEX), Christine Vuong (CAN)

== Final standings ==
Rank	Team	Record
1st place, gold medalist(s)	Russia	7–0
2nd place, silver medalist(s)	United States	6–1
3rd place, bronze medalist(s)	Canada	6–1
4th	Japan	5–2
5th	France	5–2
6th	Australia	4–3
7th	China	4–3
8th	Spain	3–4
9th	Hungary	4–3
10th	Latvia	3–4
11th	Italy	3–4
12th	Mexico	1–6
13th	Mali	2–5
14th	Puerto Rico	1–6
15th	South Korea	1–6
16th	Egypt	1–6

== Statistics and awards ==
=== Statistical leaders ===
Points

Name	PPG
(Russia) Maria Vadeeva	18.4
(Egypt) Meral Abdelgawad	17.4
(Russia) Raisa Musina	16.7
(United States) Chennedy Carter	16.1
(Australia) Eziyoda Magbegor	16.1

Rebounds

Name	RPG
(Russia) Maria Vadeeva	14.0
(Russia) Raisa Musina	12.7
(China) Han Xu	11.0
(Australia) Anneli Maley	10.7
(Hungary) Dorka Juhász	9.4

Assists

Name	APG
(China) Wang Jiaqi	7.6
(Puerto Rico) Geolibeth Perez	7.4
(United States) Tyasha Harris	5.7
(Russia) Viktoriia Zavialova	5.6
(China) Li Yuan	5.3

Blocks

Name	BPG
(China) Han Xu	3.4
(France) Maeva Djaldi-Tabdi	2.2
(Latvia) Digna Strautmane	2.0
(Australia) Eziyoda Magbegor	1.6
(Russia) Maria Vadeeva	1.6

Steals

Name	SPG
(South Korea) Park Ji-hyun	3.3
(Egypt) Meral Abdelgawad	3.0
(Mexico) Abdi Xicotencatl	2.8
(United States) Tyasha Harris	2.0
(South Korea) Lee Ju-yeon	2.0
(Australia) Eziyoda Magbegor	2.0
(Australia) Jazmin Shelley	2.0

=== Awards ===
2017 FIBA Under-19 Women's Basketball World Cup winner

Russia
First title

Most Valuable Player
(Russia) Maria Vadeeva

All-Tournament Team

- (United States) Tyasha Harris
- (United States) Chennedy Carter
- (Russia) Raisa Musina
- (Canada) Laeticia Amihere
- (Russia) Maria Vadeeva
