= 2016 FIBA Africa Under-18 Championship for Women squads =

2016 FIBA Africa U-18 Championship for Women squads

This article displays the rosters for the participating teams at the 2016 FIBA Africa Under-18 Championship for Women.

== Algeria ==
Algeria women's national U18 basketball team – 2016 FIBA Africa Championship – roster
Players
Coaches

Pos.	No.	Name	Age – Date of birth	Height	Club	Ctr.
G	4	Kenza Lallouche	17 – 28 October 1998	1.70 m (5 ft 7 in)		(Algeria)
PG	5	Sara Outaleb	17 – 8 April 1999	1.65 m (5 ft 5 in)		(Algeria)
PF	6	Manal Boukherrouba	17 – 11 October 1998	1.75 m (5 ft 9 in)		(Algeria)
F	7	Souhila Chaouche	18 – 18 March 1998	1.70 m (5 ft 7 in)		(Algeria)
C	8	Chaima Hedahdia	18 – 18 March 1998	1.78 m (5 ft 10 in)		(Algeria)
G	9	Rym Arabdiou	17 – 18 March 1999	1.66 m (5 ft 5 in)		(Algeria)
PF	10	Esma Bouhafs	17 – 22 November 1998	1.76 m (5 ft 9 in)		(Algeria)
PG	11	Hiba Azirou	17 – 6 April 1999	1.66 m (5 ft 5 in)		(Algeria)
G	12	Selma Hemici	16 – 31 August 1999	1.65 m (5 ft 5 in)		(Algeria)
SF	13	Bochra Achite	17 – 7 July 1999	1.73 m (5 ft 8 in)		(Algeria)
PG	14	Myriam Zaidi	17 – 6 June 1999	1.70 m (5 ft 7 in)		(Algeria)
F	15	Soulef Malkia	17 – 11 April 1999	1.79 m (5 ft 10 in)		(Algeria)

Head coach

- (Algeria) Belkadi Abderrazak

Assistant coach(es)

Legend

- (C) Team captain
- Club field describes current club

== Angola ==
Angola women's national U18 basketball team – 2016 FIBA Africa Championship – roster
Players
Coaches

Pos.	No.	Name	Age – Date of birth	Height	Club
PG	4	Irene Cafumo	16 – 15 September 1999	1.53 m (5 ft 0 in)	Interclube	(Angola)
PG	5	Teresa Sacato	18 – 1 April 1998	1.60 m (5 ft 3 in)	Benfica do Lubango	(Angola)
PG	6	Neusa Cândido	18 – 22 April 1998	1.60 m (5 ft 3 in)	Interclube	(Angola)
SG	7	Valeriana Moxi	17 – 26 June 1999	1.70 m (5 ft 7 in)	Interclube	(Angola)
SF	8	Regina Pequeno	17 – 14 February 1999	1.70 m (5 ft 7 in)	Inter de Benguela	(Angola)
SG	9	Breone Caculo	16 – 20 October 1999	1.67 m (5 ft 6 in)	Sporting de Benguela	(Angola)
SF	10	Edvânia Pascoal	17 – 1 July 1999	1.72 m (5 ft 8 in)	Interclube	(Angola)
PF	11	Avelina Peso	18 – 15 June 1998	1.84 m (6 ft 0 in)	Primeiro de Agosto	(Angola)
SG	12	Nelma Avelino	18 – 10 July 1998	1.72 m (5 ft 8 in)	Primeiro de Agosto	(Angola)
PF	13	Juda Quindanda	18 – 19 July 1998	1.79 m (5 ft 10 in)	Primeiro de Agosto	(Angola)
PF	14	Adalberta Candeias	18 – 28 February 1998	1.79 m (5 ft 10 in)	Primeiro de Agosto	(Angola)
C	15	Canata Miguel (C)	17 – 5 February 1999	1.85 m (6 ft 1 in)	Benfica do Lubango	(Angola)

Head coach

- (Angola) Jaime Covilhã

Assistant coach(es)

- (Angola) Jaqueline Francisco

Physio

- (Angola) Isabel Novais

Legend

- (C) Team captain
- nat field describes country

== Egypt ==
Egypt women's national U18 basketball team – 2016 FIBA Africa Championship – roster
Players
Coaches

Pos.	No.	Name	Age – Date of birth	Height	Club	Ctr.
	4	Meral Abdelgawad	17 – 13 November 1998	1.81 m (5 ft 11 in)
	5	Rana Elseady	18 – 1 April 1998	1.79 m (5 ft 10 in)
	6	Tokka Elshewekh	17 – 15 August 1999	1.77 m (5 ft 10 in)
	7	Maram Ibraheem	16 – 25 September 1999	1.87 m (6 ft 2 in)
	8	Hana Ghonim	17 – 9 December 1998	1.80 m (5 ft 11 in)
	9	Mariam Khalaf	18 – 18 April 1998	1.78 m (5 ft 10 in)
	10	Radwa Oweis	16 – 14 November 1999	1.65 m (5 ft 5 in)
	11	Radwa Sherif	18 – 1 February 1998	1.87 m (6 ft 2 in)
	12	Rana Abdelfattah	18 – 18 January 1998
	13	Nadine Rehan	17 – 1 October 1998	1.85 m (6 ft 1 in)
	14	Ganna Marouf	18 – 21 March 1998	1.84 m (6 ft 0 in)
	15	Nesma Khalifa	17 – 1 January 1999	1.91 m (6 ft 3 in)

Head coach

- (Egypt) Amr Ashour

Assistant coach(es)

Legend

- (C) Team captain
- Club field describes current club

== Ivory Coast ==
Ivory Coast women's national U18 basketball team – 2016 FIBA Africa Championship – roster
Players
Coaches

Pos.	No.	Name	Age – Date of birth	Height	Club	Ctr.
G	4	Mahoua Drame	16 – 22 October 1999	1.55 m (5 ft 1 in)	Awane	(Ivory Coast)
G	5	Mariam Sorre	18 – 26 July 1998	1.56 m (5 ft 1 in)	Awane	(Ivory Coast)
G	6	Adjoua Kanfando	17 – 22 September 1998	1.66 m (5 ft 5 in)	Elite 3A	(Ivory Coast)
SG	7	Louissa Lago	17 – 26 December 1998	1.76 m (5 ft 9 in)	ABC	(Ivory Coast)
SG	8	Komba Diarrassouba	17 – 12 July 1999	1.79 m (5 ft 10 in)	NCA	(Ivory Coast)
SG	9	Betty Asamoah	18 – 27 June 1998	1.70 m (5 ft 7 in)	Elite 3A	(Ivory Coast)
G	10	Abiba Kone	18 – 25 June 1998	1.73 m (5 ft 8 in)	CSA	(Ivory Coast)
G	11	Marie Kologo	17 – 22 December 1998	1.72 m (5 ft 8 in)	NCA	(Ivory Coast)
C	12	Aminata Savadogo	17 – 22 September 1998	1.80 m (5 ft 11 in)	NCA	(Ivory Coast)
F	13	Mariam Zagre	17 – 26 October 1998	1.73 m (5 ft 8 in)	NCA	(Ivory Coast)
PF	14	Amma Ouraga	16 – 6 December 1999	1.84 m (6 ft 0 in)	Voltaire	(Ivory Coast)
C	15	Awa Traoré	17 – 16 June 1999	1.80 m (5 ft 11 in)	NCA	(Ivory Coast)

Head coach

- (Ivory Coast) Souleymane Tembely

Assistant coach(es)

- (Ivory Coast) N'Da Thoms H.T

Legend

- (C) Team captain
- Club field describes current club

== Madagascar ==
Madagascar women's national U18 basketball team – 2016 FIBA Africa Championship – roster
Players
Coaches

Pos.	No.	Name	Age – Date of birth	Height	Club	Ctr.
PG	4	Rojohasina Lahatra	17 – 18 March 1999	1.50 m (4 ft 11 in)		(Madagascar)
PG	5	Avotra Marson	18 – 24 July 1998	1.63 m (5 ft 4 in)		(Madagascar)
SG	6	Samantha Rakotondrainibako	18 – 12 May 1998	1.80 m (5 ft 11 in)		(Madagascar)
SG	7	Tiavina Rafiringa	17 – 2 January 1999	1.74 m (5 ft 9 in)		(Madagascar)
SF	8	Muriel Hajanirina	18 – 1 July 1998	1.75 m (5 ft 9 in)		(Madagascar)
G	9	Tokin'Iaina Sambatrarimiora	18 – 25 May 1998	1.70 m (5 ft 7 in)		(Madagascar)
C	10	Herisoa Ratovoarimanga	17 – 20 January 1999	1.80 m (5 ft 11 in)		(Madagascar)
C	11	Mickaëla Andriamihaingo	17 – 5 June 1999	1.82 m (6 ft 0 in)		(Madagascar)
C	12	Tatiana Rasoanomenjanahary	15 – 9 December 2000	1.82 m (6 ft 0 in)		(Madagascar)
PF	13	Jessica Vavisoa	17 – 6 June 1999	1.82 m (6 ft 0 in)		(Madagascar)
SF	14	Elinah Ranarisaona	16 – 23 February 2000	1.77 m (5 ft 10 in)		(Madagascar)
SF	15	Christiane Jaofera	17 – 11 March 1999	1.70 m (5 ft 7 in)		(Madagascar)

Head coach

- (Madagascar)

Assistant coach(es)

- (Madagascar)

Legend

- (C) Team captain
- Club field describes current club

== Mali ==
Mali women's national U18 basketball team – 2016 FIBA Africa Championship – roster
Players
Coaches

Pos.	No.	Name	Age – Date of birth	Height	Club	Ctr.
PF	4	Adama Coulibaly	18 – 25 January 1998	1.82 m (6 ft 0 in)	Djoliba	(Mali)
F	5	Ouassa Debele	18 – 18 April 1998	1.83 m (6 ft 0 in)		(Mali)
PG	6	Aminata Diakite	17 – 27 September 1998	1.68 m (5 ft 6 in)		(Mali)
C	7	Assetou Diakite	18 – 15 February 1998	1.92 m (6 ft 4 in)		(Mali)
F	8	Kamba Diakite	17 – 1 February 1999	1.72 m (5 ft 8 in)		(Mali)
G	9	Rokia Doumbia	17 – 5 May 1999	1.75 m (5 ft 9 in)		(Mali)
C	10	Nafatoumata Haidara	17 – 8 July 1999	1.95 m (6 ft 5 in)		(Mali)
PF	11	Salimatou Kourouma	16 – 25 September 1999	1.79 m (5 ft 10 in)		(Mali)
SF	12	Djeneba Sangare	16 – 7 October 1999	1.78 m (5 ft 10 in)		(Mali)
SF	13	Awa Sidibe	16 – 29 August 1999	1.76 m (5 ft 9 in)		(Mali)
G	14	Foune Sissoko	17 – 11 January 1999	1.68 m (5 ft 6 in)		(Mali)
PF	15	Saran Traoré	18 – 13 March 1998	1.91 m (6 ft 3 in)		(Mali)

Head coach

- (Mali) Mohamed Salia

Assistant coach(es)

- (Mali) Cheick Fofana

Legend

- (C) Team captain
- Club field describes current club

== Mozambique ==
Mozambique women's national U18 basketball team – 2016 FIBA Africa Championship – roster
Players
Coaches

Pos.	No.	Name	Age – Date of birth	Height	Club	Ctr.
G	4	Delma Zita	18 – 27 March 1998	1.63 m (5 ft 4 in)	Ferroviário Maputo	(Mozambique)
SG	5	Silvia Veloso	17 – 18 October 1998	1.72 m (5 ft 8 in)	Ferroviário Beira	(Mozambique)
PG	6	Bruna Argelio	16 – 24 December 1999	1.64 m (5 ft 5 in)	Ferroviário Maputo	(Mozambique)
F	7	Shelsea Rafael	17 – 4 June 1999	1.71 m (5 ft 7 in)	Costa do Sol	(Mozambique)
F	8	Madina Camara	17 – 13 March 1999	1.68 m (5 ft 6 in)	Desportivo Maputo	(Mozambique)
SF	9	Agnes Chemane	17 – 16 October 1998	1.70 m (5 ft 7 in)	A Politécnica	(Mozambique)
F	10	Stella Boma	17 – 12 October 1998	1.79 m (5 ft 10 in)	Municipio Da Beira	(Mozambique)
PF	11	Veronica Salifu	17 – 21 May 1999	1.75 m (5 ft 9 in)	Ferroviário Beira	(Mozambique)
F	12	Zelia Banquim	18 – 7 January 1998	1.79 m (5 ft 10 in)	Ferroviário Maputo	(Mozambique)
C	13	Carla Covane	17 – 23 June 1999	1.89 m (6 ft 2 in)	Quinta Dos Lombos	(Mozambique)
PF	14	Iolanda Francisco	18 – 20 August 1998	1.83 m (6 ft 0 in)	Ferroviário Beira	(Mozambique)
PF	15	Carina Mariano	18 – 2 March 1998	1.78 m (5 ft 10 in)	Costa do Sol	(Mozambique)

Head coach

- (Mozambique) Lucília Caetano

Assistant coach(es)

- (Mozambique) Leonel Manhique

Legend

- (C) Team captain
- Club field describes current club

== Tunisia ==
Tunisia women's national U18 basketball team – 2016 FIBA Africa Championship - roster
Players
Coaches

Pos.	No.	Name	Age – Date of birth	Height	Club	Ctr.
	4	Ichrak Jebali	17 – 2 April 1999			(Tunisia)
	5	Nada Hamrouni	17 – 9 March 1999			(Tunisia)
	6	Marwa Shili	16 – 14 December 1999			(Tunisia)
	7	Eya Chabbouh	17 – 1 June 1999			(Tunisia)
	8	Amira Rebhi	18 – 13 July 1998			(Tunisia)
	9	Oumaima Elghoul	17 – 29 September 1998			(Tunisia)
	10	Nada Touzani	17 – 5 November 1998			(Tunisia)
	11	Haifa Helali	16 – 8 September 1999			(Tunisia)
	12	Fatma Aouinet	18 – 13 June 1998			(Tunisia)
	13	Sirine Ben Gara	17 – 9 April 1999			(Tunisia)
	14	Dorsaf Tayaa	17 – 16 October 1998			(Tunisia)
	15	Ghofrane Dhaouadi	17 – 18 September 1998			(Tunisia)

Head coach

Assistant coach(es)

Legend

- (C) Team captain
- Club field describes current club

== See also ==
- 2015 FIBA Africa Under-16 Championship for Women squads
