= 2016 FIBA Africa U18 Women's Championship =

International basketball tournament

2016 FIBA U18 Women's AfroBasket
13th FIBA Under-18 Women's African Basketball Championship

Tournament details
- Host country: Egypt
- Dates: 26 August – 4 September
- Teams: 8 (from 1 confederation)
- Venue: 1 (in 1 host city)

Final positions
- Champions: Mali (6th title)

Tournament statistics
- MVP: (Egypt) Abdelgawad
- Top scorer: (Mozambique) Veloso 16.3
- Top rebounds: (Uganda) Akullu 12.3
- Top assists: (Mali) Doumbia 3.2
- PPG (Team): Mali 89.0
- RPG (Team): Mali 59.0
- APG (Team): Mali 20.2

Official website
- 2016 FIBA Africa Championship for Women U-18

The 2016 FIBA Africa U18 Women's Championship (alternatively the Afrobasket U18) was the 13th U-18 FIBA Africa championship, played under the auspices of the Fédération Internationale de Basketball, the world basketball sport governing body. The tournament was held from 26 August to 4 September 2016 in Cairo, Egypt and contested by 8 national teams.

The tournament qualified the winner and the runner-up for the 2017 FIBA Under-19 Women's Basketball World Cup.

== Venue ==
- Cairo Stadium Indoor Halls Complex, Cairo

== Draw ==
Group A	Group B
Egypt; Algeria; Madagascar; Angola	Mali; Mozambique; Tunisia; Ivory Coast; Uganda

== Format ==
The Preliminary Phase of the tournament will be played in a round robin format with each team taking over its opponent respectively. The top four teams from each group will advance to the Final Phase, played in a knockout format from the Quarter-Finals onwards (Semi-Finals and Final).

== Preliminary round ==
The draw for the tournament was held on 25 August 2016 at the Le Passage Hotel in Cairo, Egypt. All times are local (UTC+2).

=== Group A ===
Pos	Team	Pld	W	L	PF	PA	PD	Pts
1	Egypt	3	3	0	226	131	+95	6
2	Angola	3	2	1	141	109	+32	5
3	Madagascar	3	1	2	136	158	−22	4
4	Algeria	3	0	3	91	196	−105	3

Source: Standings

26 August
19:00

Boxscore

Egypt	92–43	Algeria
Scoring by quarter: 30–9, 22–3, 14–22, 26–9
Pts: Radwa Sherif 21; Rebs: Radwa Sherif 13; Asts: Radwa Oweis 9		Pts: Soulef Malkia 14; Rebs: Esma Bouhafs 8 Asts: Myriam Zaidi 6

Cairo Stadium Indoor Halls Complex, Cairo

27 August
15:30

Boxscore

Madagascar	32–53	Angola
Scoring by quarter: 11–17, 10–7, 7–21, 4–8
Pts: H. Muriel Hajanirina 8 Rebs: Jessica A. Vavisoa 7 Asts: three players 2		Pts: Neuma Vunge Ambriz Avelino 12; Rebs: Avelina Nene Ezequiel Peso 10; Asts: Irene Cavemba Cafumo 2

Cairo Stadium Indoor Halls Complex, Cairo

28 August
18:00

Boxscore

Madagascar	49–78	Egypt
Scoring by quarter: 12–17, 9–21, 11–20, 17–20
Pts: M. Christiane Jaofera 14; Rebs: H. Muriel Hajarinina, Tokin'Iaina Sambatrarimiora 9 Asts: H. Muriel Hajarinina, Tokin'Iaina Sambatrarimiora 2		Pts: Meral Abdelgawad 20; Rebs: Nadine Rehan 12; Asts: Rana AbdelFattah, Nesma Khalifa 3

Cairo Stadium Indoor Halls Complex, Cairo

29 August
18:00

Boxscore

Angola	49–21	Algeria
Scoring by quarter: 20–4, 6–7, 11–4, 12–6
Pts: Avelina Nene Ezequiel Peso 18; Rebs: Avelina Nene Ezequiel Peso 7 Asts: Regina Maria Pequeno 5		Pts: Myriam Zaidi 9 Rebs: Soulef Malkia 8 Asts: Myriam Zaidi, Soulef Malkia 3

Cairo Stadium Indoor Halls Complex, Cairo

30 August
18:00

Boxscore

Egypt	56–39	Angola
Scoring by quarter: 8–9, 21–7, 17–12, 10–11
Pts: Meral Abdelgawad 17; Rebs: Nadine Rehan 10; Asts: Meral Abdelgawad 4		Pts: Neusa Madalena Candido 11; Rebs: Avelina Nene Ezequiel Peso 12; Asts: Teresa Ngueve Sacato, Valeriana Cacolama Moxi 2

Cairo Stadium Indoor Halls Complex, Cairo

31 August
15:30

Boxscore

Algeria	27–55	Madagascar
Scoring by quarter: 8–16, 6–3, 7–14, 6–19
Pts: Souhila Kaci Chaouche, Esma Bouhafs 7 Rebs: Esma Bouhafs 10; Asts: Rym Arabdiou 2		Pts: M. Christiane Jaofera, Tokin'Iaina Sambatrarimiora 12; Rebs: H. Muriel Hajanirina 13; Asts: Tokin'Iaina Sambatrarimiora 4

Cairo Stadium Indoor Halls Complex, Cairo

=== Group B ===
Pos	Team	Pld	W	L	PF	PA	PD	Pts
1	Mali	3	3	0	302	85	+217	6
2	Mozambique	3	2	1	173	149	+24	5
3	Tunisia	3	1	2	125	175	−50	4
4	Uganda	3	0	3	93	284	−191	3

Source: Standings

27 August
13:15

Boxscore

Mali	65–42	Mozambique
Scoring by quarter: 9–13, 15–8, 22–13, 19–8
Pts: Adama Coulibaly 19; Rebs: Adama Coulibaly, Salimatou Kourouma 14; Asts: Assetou Diakite 9		Pts: Silvia Amadeu Veloso 13; Rebs: Iolanda Pedro Francisco 10; Asts: Madina Camara 4

Cairo Stadium Indoor Halls Complex, Cairo

27 August
18:00

Boxscore

Uganda	26–65	Tunisia
Scoring by quarter: 7–30, 12–16, 0–14, 7–5
Pts: Brenda Edith Ayere 10; Rebs: three players 8 Asts: Hajara Najjuko 2		Pts: Marwa Shili 32; Rebs: Amira Rebhi, Dorsf Tayaa 8 Asts: Eya Chbbouh 7

Cairo Stadium Indoor Halls Complex, Cairo

28 August
15:30

Boxscore

Mozambique	55–36	Tunisia
Scoring by quarter: 9–14, 13–9, 13–7, 20–6
Pts: Silvia Amadeu Veloso 28; Rebs: Veronica Luis Salifu, Iolanda Pedro Francisco 12; Asts: Bruna da Victoria Argelio 3		Pts: Fatma Aouinet 12; Rebs: Marwa Shili 7 Asts: Marwa Shili 3

Cairo Stadium Indoor Halls Complex, Cairo

29 August
15:30

Boxscore

Uganda	19–143	Mali
Scoring by quarter: 2–46, 6–38, 2–37, 9–22

Cairo Stadium Indoor Halls Complex, Cairo

30 August
13:15

Boxscore

Mozambique	76–48	Uganda
Scoring by quarter: 32–9, 21–6, 17–19, 6–14
Pts: Delma Estevao Zita 18; Rebs: Iolanda Pedro Francisco 7 Asts: Z. Gilberto Banquim 5		Pts: Brenda Edith Ayere 16; Rebs: Melissa Akullu 14; Asts: Melissa Akullu, Brenda Edith Ayere 4

Cairo Stadium Indoor Halls Complex, Cairo

31 August
18:00

Boxscore

Tunisia	24–94	Mali

Cairo Stadium Indoor Halls Complex, Cairo

Note: Ivory Coast withdrew form the 2016 FIBA Africa Under-18 Championship for Women.

== Knockout stage ==
=== Bracket ===
Quarter-finals
2 September
Uganda	25
Egypt	67
2 September
Madagascar	39
Mozambique	59
2 September
Algeria	20
Mali	83
2 September
Tunisia	40
Angola	50

Semi-finals
3 September
Egypt	66
Mozambique	33
3 September
Mali	65
Angola	46

Final
4 September
Egypt	61
Mali	84
Third place
4 September
Mozambique	56
Angola	43

5–8th place semifinals
3 September
Uganda	38
Madagascar	65
3 September
Algeria	43
Tunisia	47

Fifth place
4 September
Madagascar	59
Tunisia	45
Seventh place
4 September
Uganda	43
Algeria	59

=== Quarterfinals ===
2 September
13:30

Boxscore

Algeria	20–83	Mali
Scoring by quarter: 10-19, 2-30, 0-20, 8-14

Cairo Stadium Indoor Halls Complex, Cairo

2 September
15:45

Boxscore

Tunisia	40–50	Angola
Scoring by quarter: 12-15, 7-11, 10-14, 11-10

Cairo Stadium Indoor Halls Complex, Cairo

2 September
18:00

Boxscore

Uganda	25–67	Egypt
Scoring by quarter: 1-27, 4-15, 10-19, 10-6

Cairo Stadium Indoor Halls Complex, Cairo

2 September
20:15

Boxscore

Madagascar	39–59	Mozambique
Scoring by quarter: 10-12, 7-11, 13-12, 9-24

Cairo Stadium Indoor Halls Complex, Cairo

=== 5–8th place semifinals ===
3 September
13:30

Boxscore

Algeria	43–47	Tunisia
Scoring by quarter: 8-15, 7-8, 13-14, 15-10

Cairo Stadium Indoor Halls Complex, Cairo

3 September
15:45

Boxscore

Uganda	38–65	Madagascar
Scoring by quarter: 8-20, 4-14, 16-15, 10-16

Cairo Stadium Indoor Halls Complex, Cairo

=== Semifinals ===
3 September
18:00

Boxscore

Egypt	66–33	Mozambique
Scoring by quarter: 12-12, 12-5, 18-10, 24-6

Cairo Stadium Indoor Halls Complex, Cairo

3 September
20:15

Boxscore

Mali	65–46	Angola
Scoring by quarter: 22-11, 16-6, 12-14, 15-15

Cairo Stadium Indoor Halls Complex, Cairo

=== Final classification games ===
==== Seventh place match ====
4 September
11:15

Boxscore

Uganda	43–59	Algeria
Scoring by quarter: 10-14, 5-16, 19-17, 9-12

Cairo Stadium Indoor Halls Complex, Cairo

==== Fifth place match ====
4 September
13:30

Boxscore

Madagascar	59–45	Tunisia
Scoring by quarter: 14-9, 14-6, 18-14, 13-16

Cairo Stadium Indoor Halls Complex, Cairo

==== Third place match ====
4 September
15:45

Boxscore

Mozambique	56–43	Angola
Scoring by quarter: 13-7, 14-9, 10-11, 19-16

Cairo Stadium Indoor Halls Complex, Cairo

==== Final ====
4 September
18:00

Boxscore

Egypt	61–84	Mali
Scoring by quarter: 4-15, 19-20, 21-23, 17-26

Cairo Stadium Indoor Halls Complex, Cairo

== Awards ==
2016 FIBA Africa Under-18 Championship for Women winner

Mali
Sixth title

Most Valuable Player
(Egypt) Meral Abdelgawad

=== All-Tournament Team ===
- (Mozambique) Silvia Veloso
- (Egypt) Nesma Khalifa
- (Egypt) Meral Abdelgawad
- (Mali) Adama Coulibaly
- (Mali) Aminata Diakite

== Final standings ==
Qualified for the 2017 FIBA U19 World Women's Championship

Rank	Team	Record
Gold medal	Mali	6-0
Silver medal	Egypt	5-1
Bronze medal	Mozambique	4-2
4.	Angola	3-3
5.	Madagascar	2-4
6.	Tunisia	2-4
7.	Algeria	1-5
8.	Uganda	0-6
