= Salimatou =

Salimatou is a given name. Notable people with the name include:

- Salimatou Fatty (born 1994), Gambian educator
- Salimatou Kourouma (born 1999), Malian basketball player
