= Adama Coulibaly =

Adama Coulibaly may refer to:

- Adama Coulibaly (footballer, born 1980), Malian football centre-back
- Adama Coulibaly (basketball) (born 1998), Malian basketball player
- Adama Coulibaly (footballer, born 2005), New Zealand football midfielder for Auckland FC

== See also ==
- Adamo Coulibaly (born 1981), French football forward
