= 2022 FIBA U18 Women's African Championship =

2022 FIBA U18 Women's AfroBasket
16th FIBA Under-18 Women's African Basketball Championship

Tournament details
- Host country: Madagascar
- City: Antsirabe
- Dates: 5−13 August
- Teams: 8 (from 1 confederation)
- Venue(s): 1 (in 1 host city)

Final positions
- Champions: Mali (8th title)
- Runners-up: Egypt
- Third place: Angola

Tournament statistics
- MVP: (Mali) Maimouna Haidara
- Top scorer: (Egypt) Elalfy (24.7)
- Top rebounds: (Tanzania) Minja (13.2)
- Top assists: (Egypt) Ebrahim (3.8)
- PPG (Team): Mali (96.8)
- RPG (Team): Egypt (60.5)
- APG (Team): Mali (21.0)

Official website
- www.fiba.basketball

The 2022 FIBA U18 Women's African Championship was an international under-18 basketball competition that was held in Antsirabe, Madagascar from August 5 to 13.

The tournament, which was also the 16th edition of the biennial competition, qualified the top two teams to represent FIBA Africa in the 2023 FIBA Under-19 Women's Basketball World Cup in Spain. This is the first time Madagascar hosted the tournament.

Mali regained the continental championship, and their eighth title overall, after overpowering the defending champions Egypt in the Final, 86–54. Meanwhile, Angola defeated the hosts Madagascar in the Third Place Game, 53–37, to claim their fifth overall Bronze Medal finish.

== Qualification ==
Means of Qualification	Dates	Venue	Berths	Qualifiers
Host Nation	N/A	N/A	1	Madagascar
2020 FIBA U18 Women's African Championship Finalists	3–9 December 2020	(Egypt) Cairo	2	Egypt; Mali
2022 Zone I U18 Qualifiers	N/A	N/A	1	Algeria
2022 Zone II U18 Qualifiers	N/A	N/A	N/A	N/A
2022 Zone III U18 Qualifiers	N/A	N/A	N/A	N/A
2022 Zone IV U18 Qualifiers	N/A	N/A	N/A	N/A
2022 Zone V U18 Qualifiers	13–19 June 2022	(Uganda) Kampala	1	Uganda
2022 Zone VI U18 Qualifiers	December 2021	(Lesotho) Maseru	1	Angola
2022 Zone VII U18 Qualifiers	N/A	N/A	N/A	N/A
Wildcard Entry	13–19 June 2022	N/A	1	Tanzania
Total			8	

=== Qualified teams ===
Includes current world ranking prior to the start of the tournament (in parentheses).

- Host Nation (1)
  - Madagascar (NR)
- Zone I
  - Algeria (50)
- Zone II
  - Guinea (NR)
  - Mali (15)
- Zone V
  - Uganda (59)
  - Tanzania (66)
  - Egypt (31)
- Zone VI
  - Angola (40)

== Preliminary round ==
The draw took place on 3 August 2022.

All times are local (UTC+3).

=== Group A ===
Pos	Team	Pld	W	L	PF	PA	PD	Pts	Qualification
1	Mali	3	3	0	311	104	+207	6	Advance to Quarterfinals
2	Madagascar (H)	3	1	2	153	189	−36	4 (Note: 1−1, 1.108 (beaten Algeria, lost to Uganda))	Advance to Quarterfinals
3	Uganda	3	1	2	168	226	−58	4 (Note: 1−1, 1.016 (beaten Madagascar, lost to Algeria))	Advance to Quarterfinals
4	Algeria	3	1	2	139	252	−113	4 (Note: 1−1, 0.898 (beaten Uganda, lost to Madagascar))	Advance to Quarterfinals

Source: FIBA Africa
Rules for classification: 1) Points; 2) Head-to-head results; 3) Points difference; 4) Points scored.
(H) Hosts
Notes:

5 August 2022
15:00

Boxscore

Algeria	24–124	Mali
Scoring by quarter: 8–23, 1–31, 3–37, 12–33
Pts: Mami, Merzkane, Kaouah 4 Rebs: Yahiaoui 5 Asts: Yahiaoui, Merzkane 1		Pts: Haidara 27; Rebs: Haidara 11; Asts: Traore 4

Gymnase Vatofotsy, Antsirabe
Referees: Walelign Fikadu Gebeto (ETH), Christelle Madjio Libawo (CMR), Yomna Arafa (EGY)

6 August 2022
16:30

Boxscore

Madagascar	54–59	Uganda
Scoring by quarter: 12–16, 11–13, 19–17, 12–13
Pts: Rasolofoson 19; Rebs: Rakotonirina 13; Asts: Rasolofoson 4		Pts: Letaru 18; Rebs: Namale 16; Asts: Namale 3

Gymnase Vatofotsy, Antsirabe
Referees: Christelle Madjio Libawo (CMR), Benedicte Tresor Kologo (CIV), Paulo Luvati (ANG)

7 August 2022
12:30

Boxscore

Mali	100–40	Uganda
Scoring by quarter: 15–7, 30–10, 35–10, 20–13
Pts: Haidara 19; Rebs: Haidara 15; Asts: Dabou 5		Pts: Lamunu 11; Rebs: Lamunu 9 Asts: Namale 3

Gymnase Vatofotsy, Antsirabe
Referees: Maria Bagnath (MOZ), Nadege Zouzou (CIV), Paulo Luvati (ANG)

7 August 2022
17:30

Boxscore

Madagascar	59–43	Algeria
Scoring by quarter: 24–8, 12–8, 12–6, 11–21
Pts: Rasolofoson 13; Rebs: Rakotonirina 11; Asts: Rasolofoson, Rakotonirina 3		Pts: Yahiaoui 11; Rebs: Yahiaoui 12; Asts: Mami 2

Gymnase Vatofotsy, Antsirabe
Referees: Nadege Zouzou (CIV), Yomna Arafa (EGY), Maria Bagnath (MOZ)

8 August 2022
12:30

Boxscore

Uganda	69–72	Algeria
Scoring by quarter: 10–15, 26–23, 15–16, 18–18
Pts: Nantongo 13; Rebs: Lamunu 11; Asts: 5 players 2		Pts: Yahiaoui 16; Rebs: Kaouah 8 Asts: Mimouni 3

Gymnase Vatofotsy, Antsirabe
Referees: Paulo Luvati (ANG), Benedicte Tresor Kologo (CIV), Maria Bagnath (MOZ)

8 August 2022
15:00

Boxscore

Mali	87–40	Madagascar
Scoring by quarter: 22–8, 24–11, 18–10, 23–11
Pts: Haidara 28; Rebs: Haidara 12; Asts: Sanou 4		Pts: Rahariarivony 9 Rebs: Rakotobe, Raharitiana 6 Asts: Rasolofoson 2

Gymnase Vatofotsy, Antsirabe
Referees: Yomna Arafa (EGY), Walelign Fikadu Gebeto (ETH), Christelle Madjio Libawo (CMR)

=== Group B ===
Pos	Team	Pld	W	L	PF	PA	PD	Pts	Qualification
1	Egypt	3	3	0	289	126	+163	6	Advance to Quarterfinals
2	Angola	3	2	1	203	125	+78	5	Advance to Quarterfinals
3	Tanzania	3	1	2	139	240	−101	4	Advance to Quarterfinals
4	Guinea	3	0	3	109	249	−140	3	Advance to Quarterfinals

Source: FIBA Africa
Rules for classification: 1) Points; 2) Head-to-head results; 3) Points difference; 4) Points scored.

5 August 2022
17:30

Boxscore

Egypt	111–38	Guinea
Scoring by quarter: 29–8, 27–8, 31–11, 24–14
Pts: Elalfy 29; Rebs: Elalfy 10; Asts: Ebrahim 8		Pts: Soumah 13; Rebs: Keita 8 Asts: Keita 2

Gymnase Vatofotsy, Antsirabe
Referees: Nadege Zouzou (CIV), Benedicte Tresor Kologo (CIV), Maria Bagnath (MOZ)

6 August 2022
19:00

Boxscore

Angola	77–39	Tanzania
Scoring by quarter: 8–9, 20–10, 22–9, 27–11
Pts: A. Joao 17; Rebs: I. Joao 13; Asts: Sindalawa, Domingos 2		Pts: Mhina 9 Rebs: Mbugeni 11; Asts: P. Mollel 5

Gymnase Vatofotsy, Antsirabe
Referees: Nadjet Zenagui (ALG), Fanta Toure (MLI), Marie Lucia Rakotonioly (MAD)

7 August 2022
15:00

Boxscore

Guinea	19–76	Angola
Scoring by quarter: 5–25, 7–19, 2–22, 5–10
Pts: Diack 10; Rebs: Bayo 11; Asts: 0		Pts: Joaquim 21; Rebs: Joaquim, Kondaponi 8 Asts: Domingos 4

Gymnase Vatofotsy, Antsirabe
Referees: Walelign Fikadu Gebeto (ETH), Lizzy Nambuya (UGA), Christelle Madjio Libawo (CMR)

7 August 2022
20:00

Boxscore

Tanzania	38–111	Egypt
Scoring by quarter: 11–33, 7–23, 7–25, 13–30
Pts: Minja 9 Rebs: Mhondo 10; Asts: Laizer, P. Mollel 1		Pts: Elalfy 30; Rebs: Elalfy 13; Asts: Ibrahim 5

Gymnase Vatofotsy, Antsirabe
Referees: Fanta Toure (MLI), Nadjet Zenagui (ALG), Benedicte Tresor Kologo (CIV)

8 August 2022
17:30

Boxscore

Tanzania	62–52	Guinea
Scoring by quarter: 19–16, 17–8, 22–7, 4–21
Pts: Mhina 16; Rebs: Minja 20; Asts: Mhondo 4		Pts: Soumah 16; Rebs: Diack 12; Asts: Soumah 3

Gymnase Vatofotsy, Antsirabe
Referees: Nadjet Zenagui (ALG), Benedicte Tresor Kologo (CIV), Marie Lucia Rakotonioly (MAD)

8 August 2022
20:00

Boxscore

Egypt	67–50	Angola
Scoring by quarter: 17–18, 10–8, 15–11, 25–13
Pts: Elalfy 17; Rebs: Elalfy 14; Asts: Ebrahim 5		Pts: Sindalawa 16; Rebs: I. Joao 10; Asts: I. Joao 1

Gymnase Vatofotsy, Antsirabe
Referees: Walelign Fikadu Gebeto (ETH), Nadege Zouzou (CIV), Fanta Toure (MLI)

== Knockout stage ==
=== Bracket ===
Fifth place
3A	Uganda	64
4A	Algeria	42
Seventh place
4B	Guinea	39
3B	Tanzania	58

5–8th place semifinals
4B	Guinea	54
3A	Uganda	62
3B	Tanzania	35
4A	Algeria	71

Quarterfinals
1A	Mali	117
4B	Guinea	37
3A	Uganda	44
2B	Angola	57
2A	Madagascar	61
3B	Tanzania	58
4A	Algeria	44
1B	Egypt	98

Semifinals
1A	Mali	67
2B	Angola	36
2A	Madagascar	66
1B	Egypt	98

Final
1A	Mali	86
1B	Egypt	54
Third place
2B	Angola	53
2A	Madagascar	37

=== Quarterfinals ===
10 August 2022
12:30

Boxscore

Algeria	44–98	Egypt
Scoring by quarter: 13–28, 18–22, 7–20, 6–28
Pts: Yahiaoui 13; Rebs: Chebraoui 6 Asts: Mimouni, Yahiaoui 2		Pts: Elalfy 19; Rebs: Sallman 11; Asts: Elalfy 5

Gymnase Vatofotsy, Antsirabe
Referees: Nadege Zouzou (CIV), Paulo Luvati (ANG), Maria Bagnath (MOZ)

10 August 2022
15:00

Boxscore

Tanzania	58–61	Madagascar
Scoring by quarter: 10–15, 9–11, 23–12, 16–23
Pts: Mbugeni 22; Rebs: Minja 20; Asts: Mbugeni 5		Pts: Rakotobe 14; Rebs: Raharitiana 8 Asts: Ramahatra, Rakotonanahary 3

Gymnase Vatofotsy, Antsirabe
Referees: Walelign Fikadu Gebeto (ETH), Christelle Madjio Libawo (CMR), Fanta Toure (MLI)

10 August 2022
17:30

Boxscore

Uganda	44–57	Angola
Scoring by quarter: 15–12, 5–24, 17–16, 7–5
Pts: Nantongo 12; Rebs: Nantongo 11; Asts: Lamunu 4		Pts: Sindalawa 14; Rebs: I. Joao 9 Asts: Ngungui 2

Gymnase Vatofotsy, Antsirabe
Referees: Nadjet Zenagui (ALG), Nadege Zouzou (CIV), Marie Lucia Rakotonioly (MAD)

10 August 2022
20:00

Boxscore

Guinea	37–117	Mali
Scoring by quarter: 9–32, 15–28, 4–31, 9–26
Pts: Soumah 16; Rebs: Diack 14; Asts: three players 2		Pts: Haidara 25; Rebs: Cisse, Thienou 10; Asts: Haidara 6

Gymnase Vatofotsy, Antsirabe
Referees: Benedicte Tresor Kologo (CIV), Yomna Arafa (EGY), Lizzy Nambuya (UGA)

=== 5–8th place semifinals ===
11 August 2022
10:00

Boxscore

Algeria	71–35	Tanzania
Scoring by quarter: 21–8, 8–5, 23–8, 19–14
Pts: Chebraoui 20; Rebs: Chebraoui 9 Asts: Yahiaoui 13		Pts: Mhondo 9 Rebs: A. Mollel 10; Asts: E. Mollel 2

Gymnase Vatofotsy, Antsirabe
Referees: Yomna Arafa (EGY), Fanta Toure (MLI), Lizzy Nambuya (UGA)

11 August 2022
12:30

Boxscore

Guinea	54–62	Uganda
Scoring by quarter: 20–19, 8–13, 4–14, 22–16
Pts: Soumah 13; Rebs: Soumah 15; Asts: five players 1		Pts: Letaru 16; Rebs: Letaru 16; Asts: Adongpiny, Letaru 3

Gymnase Vatofotsy, Antsirabe
Referees: Walelign Fikadu Gebeto (ETH), Paulo Luvati (ANG), Marie Lucia Rakotonioly (MAD)

=== Semifinals ===
11 August 2022
15:00

Boxscore

Egypt	98–66	Madagascar
Scoring by quarter: 26–21, 15–22, 29–14, 28–9
Pts: Elalfy 34; Rebs: Sallman 11; Asts: Habiba 6		Pts: Rakotobe 22; Rebs: Rakotobe 8 Asts: Rakotonanahary 9

Gymnase Vatofotsy, Antsirabe
Referees: Nadjet Zenagui (ALG), Benedicte Tresor Kologo (CIV), Maria Bagnath (MOZ)

11 August 2022
17:30

Boxscore

Mali	67–36	Angola
Scoring by quarter: 18–15, 16–6, 21–3, 12–12
Pts: Haidara 22; Rebs: Haidara 18; Asts: Sanou 4		Pts: Joaquim 10; Rebs: I. Joao 11; Asts: Joaquim 2

Gymnase Vatofotsy, Antsirabe
Referees: Nadege Zouzou (CIV), Walelign Fikadu Gebeto (ETH), Christelle Madjio Libawo (CMR)

=== Seventh place game ===
12 August 2022
12:30

Boxscore

Guinea	39–58	Tanzania
Scoring by quarter: 9–15, 6–9, 8–19, 16–15
Pts: Diack 15; Rebs: Diack 21; Asts: Diack 2		Pts: P. Mollel 12; Rebs: Minja 15; Asts: Mhondo 3

Gymnase Vatofotsy, Antsirabe

=== Fifth place game ===
12 August 2022
15:00

Boxscore

Uganda	64–42	Algeria
Scoring by quarter: 19–5, 12–8, 19–17, 14–12
Pts: Nambogo 12; Rebs: Letaru 18; Asts: Namyalo 4		Pts: Yahiaoui, Dellaa 12; Rebs: Kaouah 9 Asts: Mimouni 3

Gymnase Vatofotsy, Antsirabe
Referees: Fanta Toure (MLI), Maria Bagnath (MOZ), Marie Lucia Rakotonioly (MAD)

=== Third place game ===
13 August 2022
15:00

Boxscore

Angola	53–37	Madagascar
Scoring by quarter: 7–10, 19–15, 14–8, 13–4
Pts: I. Joao 14; Rebs: Joaquim, I. Joao, 15; Asts: Chinhama 2		Pts: Rasolofoson 9 Rebs: Rakotobe 7 Asts: Rakotobe 3

Gymnase Vatofotsy, Antsirabe
Referees: Walelign Fikadu Gebeto (ETH), Christelle Madjio Libawo (CMR), Yomna Arafa (EGY)

=== Final ===
13 August 2022
17:30

Boxscore

Mali	86–54	Egypt
Scoring by quarter: 23–15, 15–9, 25–13, 23–17
Pts: Haidara 22; Rebs: Haidara 12; Asts: Drame 5		Pts: Elalfy 19; Rebs: Elalfy 12; Asts: Radwan, Habiba 3

Gymnase Vatofotsy, Antsirabe
Referees: Nadege Zouzou (CIV), Nadjet Zenagui (ALG)

== Final standings ==
Qualified for the 2023 FIBA Under-19 Women's Basketball World Cup

Rank	Team	Record
Gold medal	Mali	6–0
Silver medal	Egypt	5–1
Bronze medal	Angola	4–2
4	Madagascar	2–4
5	Uganda	3–3
6	Algeria	2–4
7	Tanzania	2–4
8	Guinea	0–6

== Awards ==
2022 Under-18 Women's African champions

Mali
Eighth title

Most Valuable Player
(Mali) Maimouna Haidara

=== All-Tournament Team ===
- C (Egypt) Jana Elalfy
- F (Mali) Maimouna Haidara (MVP)
- F (Angola) Isabel Joao
- G (Madagascar) Marion Rasolofoson
- G (Algeria) Doua Yahiaoui
