= Palasport Primo Carnera =

Indoor sporting arena in Udine, Italy

- PalaCarnera
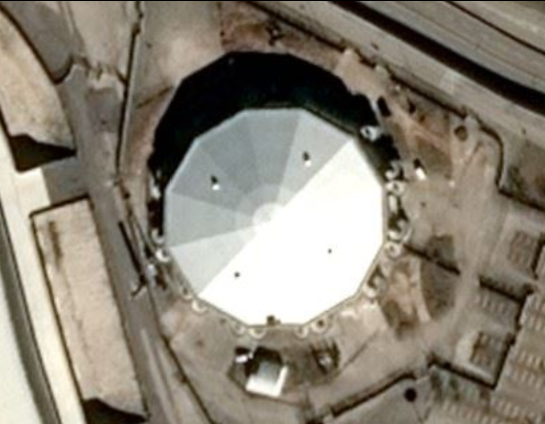
- Interactive map of Palasport Primo Carnera
- Address: Via Floriano Candonio 540
- Location: Udine, Italy
- Coordinates: 46°04′55.4″N 13°12′06.8″E
- Owner: Udine
- Capacity: 3,500
- Type: Arena

Construction
- Groundbreaking: 1969
- Opened: 1970
- Renovated: 2016

Tenants
- Pallalcesto Amatori Udine; Libertas Sporting Club Udine

Palasport Primo Carnera is an indoor sporting arena located in Udine, Italy. The capacity of the arena is 3,500 people. It is currently home of the APU Udine basketball team. It is named after former world heavyweight boxing champion Primo Carnera, who was born in Sequals, near Udine.

The Palasport Primo Carnera will host many games of the 2017 FIBA Under-19 Women's Basketball World Cup, including the final.
