= Algeria women's national under-18 basketball team =

Algeria
- FIBA zone: FIBA Africa
- National federation: Algerian Basketball Federation

U19 World Cup
- Appearances: None

U18 AfroBasket
- Appearances: 3
- Medals: None

The Algeria women's national under-18 basketball team is a national basketball team of Algeria, administered by the Algerian Basketball Federation. It represents the country in international under-18 women's basketball competitions.

== FIBA U18 Women's AfroBasket participations ==
Year	Result
2014	4th
2016	7th
2022	6th

== See also ==
- Algeria women's national basketball team
- Algeria women's national under-16 basketball team
- Algeria men's national under-18 basketball team
