= Madagascar women's national under-18 basketball team =

Madagascar
- FIBA zone: FIBA Africa
- National federation: Fédération Malagasy de Basket-Ball

U19 World Cup
- Appearances: None

U18 AfroBasket
- Appearances: 2
- Medals: None

The Madagascar women's national under-18 basketball team is a national basketball team of Madagascar, administered by the Fédération Malagasy de Basket-Ball. It represents the country in international under-18 women's basketball competitions.

== FIBA U18 Women's AfroBasket participations ==
Year	Result
2016	5th
2022	4th

== See also ==
- Madagascar women's national basketball team
- Madagascar women's national under-16 basketball team
- Madagascar men's national under-18 basketball team
