= Phil Brown (basketball coach) =

Australian basketball coach

Philip Keith Brown (24 July 1958) is an Australian basketball coach and coached the Australian Institute of Sport Women's Team 1986 to 2005 and 2009 to 2013.

In his high school days, Brown played cricket and but was drawn back to basketball in the early 1970s. Brown played for the Canberra Cannons in the National Basketball League from 1981 to 1983. After his playing career, he moved into coaching with his first major appointments being ACT Basketball State Junior Coach from 1983-1989 and Assistant Coach Canberra Cannons from 1986 to 1987.

In 1986, he was appointed Australian Institute of Sport (AIS) Women's Assistant Coach and in 1991 was appointed Head Coach in 1991. In 1993, National Junior Women's Team won the World Championship and all players were current (four) and former AIS scholarship holders. Another highlight for Brown was coaching the young AIS team to win the 1988-1999 WNBL Premiership.

Leading Australian players coached by Brown at the AIS include Lauren Jackson, Penny Taylor, Kristi Harrower, Kristen Veal, Suzy Batkovic, Belinda Snell, Jenni Screen, Carla Boyd, Jenna O'Hea, Laura Summerton and Michelle Brogan. These players were significant contributors to Opals medal success at the Olympic Games from 1996 to 2012 and World Championships 1998 to 2014.

In 2005, Brown left the AIS to take up the position of Associate Head Coach of the University of Oregon Women's Basketball Team. In 2009, he returned to Australia to again become Head Coach of the AIS Women's Program.

In November 2013, Brown was named Basketball ACT's Head of High Performance and Coaching.

== National Appointments ==
- Head coach, National Junior Women's Team (Gems) - 2003-2005
- Assistant coach, National Senior Women's Team (Opals) - 2001-2002
- Assistant coach, National Junior Women's Team (Gems) - 1990-2002
- Scouting coach, National Senior Women's Team (Opals)(Opals) - 1999-2000

== Recognition ==
- 2000 - Australian Sports Medal
- 2002/2003 - Women's National Basketball League life member
- 2017 - ACT Sports Hall of Fame inductee.
- 2023 - University of Canberra Sports Walk of Fame.
