= Wang Jiaqi =

Chinese association football player

Personal information
- Date of birth: 26 December 2001 (age 24)
- Position: Midfielder

Team information
- Current team: Shanghai Second

Youth career
- –2021: Sichuan Jiuniu

Senior career*
Years	Team	Apps	(Gls)
2021–2023	Sichuan Jiuniu	18	(2)
2023	Qingdao West Coast	0	(0)
2023	→ Hubei Istar (loan)	2	(0)
2023–2024	Hunan Billows	6	(0)
2024–2025	Wenzhou	23	(2)
2025–2026	Kunming City	5	(0)
2026–	Shanghai Second	0	(0)
- * Club domestic league appearances and goals as of 22:41, 8 March 2026 (UTC)

Wang Jiaqi (Chinese: 王佳旗; born 26 December 2001) is a Chinese footballer currently playing as a midfielder for China League Two club Shanghai Second.

== Career statistics ==
=== Club ===
As of 27 July 2021.

Club	Season	League			Cup		Continental		Other		Total	
Club	Season	Division	Apps	Goals	Apps	Goals	Apps	Goals	Apps	Goals	Apps	Goals
Sichuan Jiuniu	2021	China League One	5	0	0	0	–		0	0	5	0
Career total			5	0	0	0	0	0	0	0	5	0
