= Aislinn Konig =

Canadian basketball player (born 1998)

No. 2 – Flammes Carolo
- Position: Shooting guard
- League: LFB

Personal information
- Born: May 20, 1998 (age 28) Vancouver, British Columbia, Canada
- Listed height: 5 ft 9 in (1.75 m)

Career information
- High school: Brookswood Secondary School (Langley, British Columbia)
- College: NC State (2016-2020)
- Playing career: 2020–present

Career history
- 2020–2021: BC Castors Braine
- 2021–2022: Elfic Fribourg
- 2022–present: Flammes Carolo

Career highlights
- ACC Tournament MVP (2020)
- Stats at Basketball Reference
Medals
Women's basketball
Representing Canada
FIBA AmeriCup
Bronze medal – third place	2023 León
FIBA Under-19 World Cup
Bronze medal – third place	2017 Italy	Team

Aislinn "Ace" Konig (born May 20, 1998) is a Canadian professional basketball player for the Flammes Carolo Basket of the Ligue Féminine de Basketball. She played college basketball for the NC State Wolfpack.

A switch-up guard and a three-point shooter, Konig is a decorated British Columbia school player. She has competed at NCAA Division 1 level and played professionally in Europe.

== Early life ==
Playing for the Brookswood Bobcats in Langley, British Columbia, Konig won three provincial championships and was named MVP in each season.

== College career ==
Upon graduating, she was recruited to the NC State Wolfpack, where she played four ACC seasons. With the Wolfpack she reached the third round of the NCAA Division I women's basketball tournament as a sophomore and junior, the same year she also set an ACC record for most three-pointers in a season. In her senior year she won the ACC Tournament with the Wolfpack and was named the tournament MVP and to the All-ACC Second Team. She ended her NC State career as the program's all-time leading three-point shooter and graduated with a degree in Business Administration.

== Professional career ==
Konig turned professional in 2020, signing with BC Castors Braine in Belgium. The following season she competed with Swiss team Elfic Fribourg, for whom she was the leading scorer in the team's perfect season. Following that, she joined the Washington Mystics' training camp before signing with Flammes Carolo in France for the 2022-23 season.

== National team career ==
Konig made her international debut at age fourteen, first competing for Canada at the Under-16 and Under-18 teams in FIBA Americas tournaments. She was part of the team for the 2017 FIBA Under-19 Women's Basketball World Cup, where she helped the team medal for the first time in their history as well as setting a record for most threes in a single game, with ten against Latvia. She made her senior team debut at the 2019 Pan-American Games and was later called up for the 2021 FIBA Women's AmeriCup and 2022 FIBA Women's Basketball World Cup, where Canada finished fourth both times.

== Personal life ==
On 15 August 2024, Konig married Indonesia national football team player Sandy Walsh in Spain.
