= Salimatou Fatty =

Gambian educator and gender advocate

- Born: The Gambia
- Occupation: Educator
- Years active: 2015 - Present
- Known for: Youth Education

Salimatou Fatty (born 2 February 1994) is a Gambian educator and gender advocate. She is the Founder of the Salimatou Foundation for Education, a charitable foundation in The Gambia that advocate for accessible and affordable quality education for all. She is a Global Youth Advocate at Global Partnership for Education. In 2017, she was named in the 100 list of the most influential young Africans for her efforts in promoting education for young girls.

== Education ==
Fatty started her education at Arabic institution where she learned about her Islam religion. She proceed to Kerewan Primary School up to primary 2. After completion of Primary two, Salimatou and her family moved to the city in FajiKunda. She studied Gender and Development at Management Development Institute and is currently studying law at the University of the Gambia.

=== Activism ===
Salimatou started her humanitarian work in 2014 after her High School Education. She was appointed as Global Youth Ambassador by A World At School in 2014 to 2017. She founded the Salimatou Foundation for Education in November 2015. Her charity advocates for quality education for all and Gender Equality. She was nominated for African Youth Award under “Advocate of the year” in December 2016, she was named “Girl of the Month” in September 2016 by Girls Pride Circle, and she was named “Young Personality of the week” in March 2016 by Young People in the Media. Salimatou is a Barack Obama Young African Leaders Initiative (YALI RLC) Alumni. She was named “African Woman of the Day” by MTV Ghana on 3 March 2017, she was listed as 100 Most Influential Young Africans leaders in 2017 by African Youth Award. Salimatou has represented and attended several conferences and meetings In Africa, Asia, America, Europe and United Kingdom on humanitarian issues.

== Personal life ==
Fatty was born in Kerewan village in the North Bank Division of the Gambia in 1994 to Aja Fatoumatta Jarra Ceesay and Alhajie Saikou Fatty. She is the seventh of nine children. She attended Oustass Keita Dara, where she learned to practice her religion, Islam. Her father died when she was one year old. She was raised by a single mother. In 2019 January, after her medical checkup, she found out she has been suffering from multiple scoliosis. Salimatou has been battling with depression throughout 2019.
