= Raisa Musina =

Russian basketball player

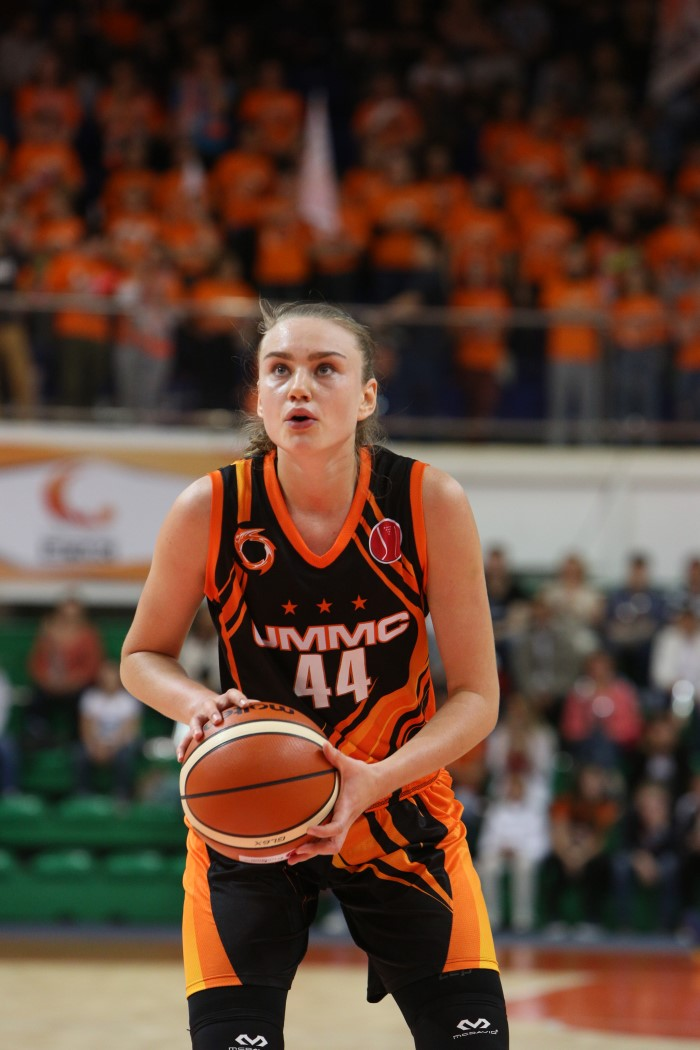

No. 44 – UMMC Ekaterinburg
- Position: Power forward
- League: RWPL

Personal information
- Born: March 31, 1998 (age 28) Moscow, Russia
- Listed height: 6 ft 4 in (1.93 m)

Career information
- WNBA draft: 2018: 2nd round, 21st overall pick
- Drafted by: Phoenix Mercury
- Stats at Basketball Reference
Medals
Representing Russia
Basketball
FIBA U19 World Cup
Gold medal – first place	2017 Italy	Team
FIBA U18 European Championship
Bronze medal – third place	2016 Hungary	Team

Raisa Aleksandrovna Musina (Russian: Раиса Александровна Мусина; born March 31, 1998) is a Russian basketball player for Dynamo Moscow and the Russian national team. She participated at the EuroBasket Women 2017.
