= Himawari Akaho =

Japanese basketball player

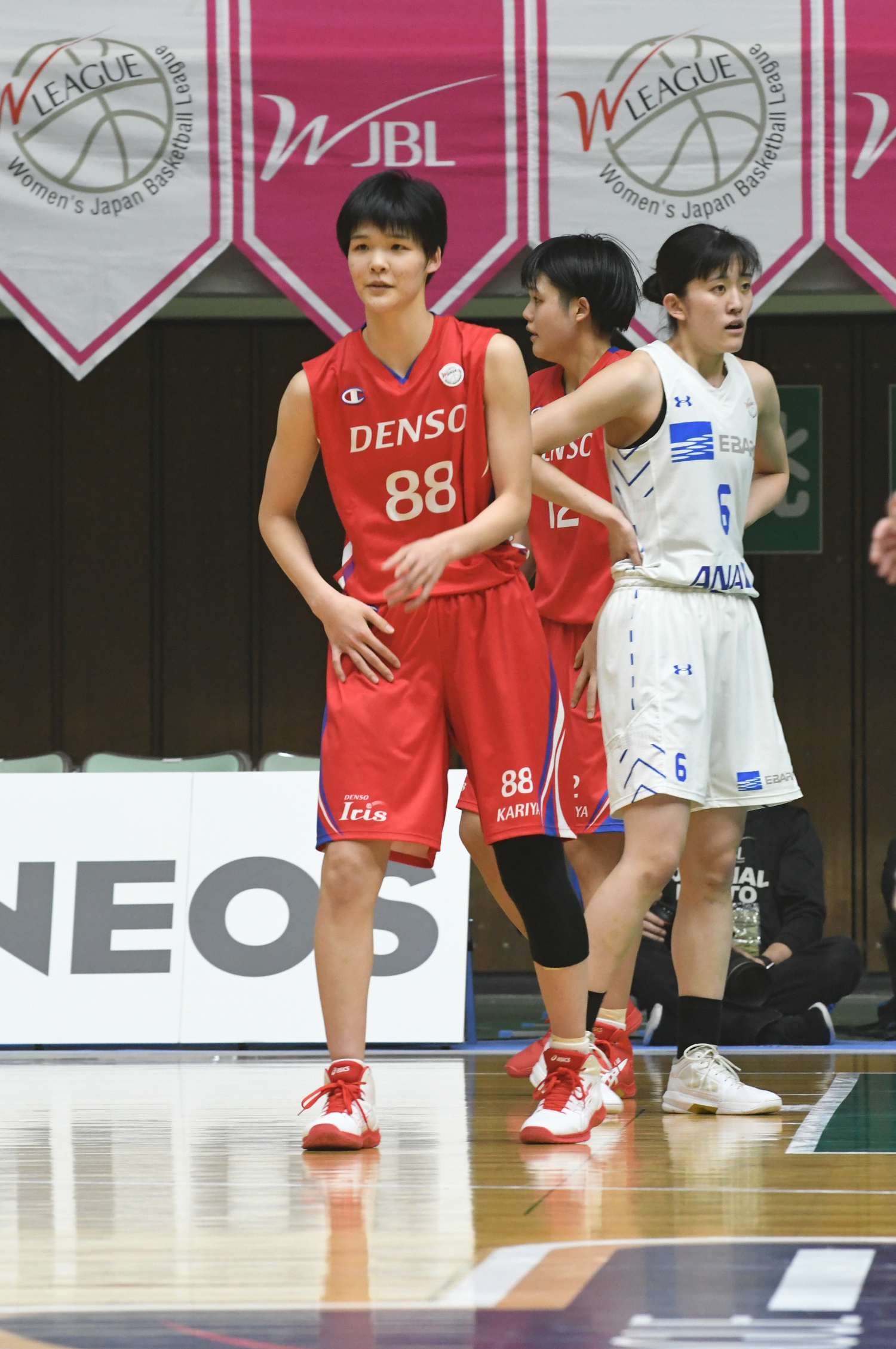
- Akaho in 2019

No. 88 – Denso Iris
- Position: Shooting guard
- League: WJBL

Personal information
- Born: 28 August 1998 (age 28) Ishikawa, Japan
- Listed height: 6 ft 1 in (1.85 m)
- Listed weight: 157 lb (71 kg)
Medals
Women's basketball
Representing Japan
Olympic Games
Silver medal – second place	2020 Tokyo	Team
FIBA Asia Cup
Gold medal – first place	2019 India
Gold medal – first place	2021 Jordan
Silver medal – second place	2023 Australia
Asian Games
Silver medal – second place	2022 Hangzhou	team
Asia U-18 Championship
Silver medal – second place	2014 Amman	Team
Asia U-16 Championship
Silver medal – second place	2013 Colombo	Team

Himawari Akaho (赤穂 ひまわり, Akaho Himawari; born 28 August 1998) is a Japanese basketball player for Denso Iris and the Japanese national team. She competed at the 2020 Summer Olympics, winning a silver medal.

== Career ==
She participated at the 2018 FIBA Women's Basketball World Cup.
