= Asrar Bakr =

Egyptian basketball player

Asrar Bakr (born 10 August 1998) is an Egyptian basketball player who plays for the Egyptian women's basketball team and also Sporting Club in Egypt. She is 5 feet 11 inches tall (180cm).

== Career highlights ==
=== Senior National Team ===
Sources:

- 2023 FIBA Women's AfroBasket 2023: Participated in 3 games, averaging 2 points, 1 rebound, 0.7 assists, with an efficiency of 2.
- 2023 FIBA Women's AfroBasket – Qualifiers: Played 5 games, averaging 6.4 points, 1 rebound, 1.6 assists, with an efficiency of 4.4.
- 2021 FIBA Women's Afrobasket – Qualifiers – Zone 5: Appeared in 4 games, averaging 2.8 points, 1.8 rebounds, 1.8 assists, with an efficiency of 4.
- 2019 FIBA Women's Afrobasket: Played 4 games, with stats of 0 points, 0.5 rebounds, 0.8 assists, with an efficiency of -0.5.
- 2019 FIBA Women's Afrobasket – Qualifiers: Participated in 5 games, averaging 3 points, 1.4 rebounds, 2.2 assists, with an efficiency of 2.6.
- 2017 FIBA Women's Afrobasket: Played 6 games, averaging 2.5 points, 0.2 rebounds, 0.3 assists, with an efficiency of 0.3. Overall average for senior national team appearances: 2.7 points, 1 rebound, 1.2 assists, with an efficiency of 2.1.

=== Youth National Team ===
Sources:

- 2017 FIBA U19 Women's Basketball World Cup: Played 7 games, averaging 10.4 points, 1 rebound, 2.4 assists, with an efficiency of 4.
- 2015 FIBA U19 Women's World Championship: Participated in 6 games, with stats of 1 point, 0.8 rebounds, 1.3 assists, with an efficiency of 0.2. Overall average for youth national team appearances: 5.7 points, 0.9 rebounds, 1.9 assists, with an efficiency of 2.1.
