= Paula Ginzo =

Spanish basketball player

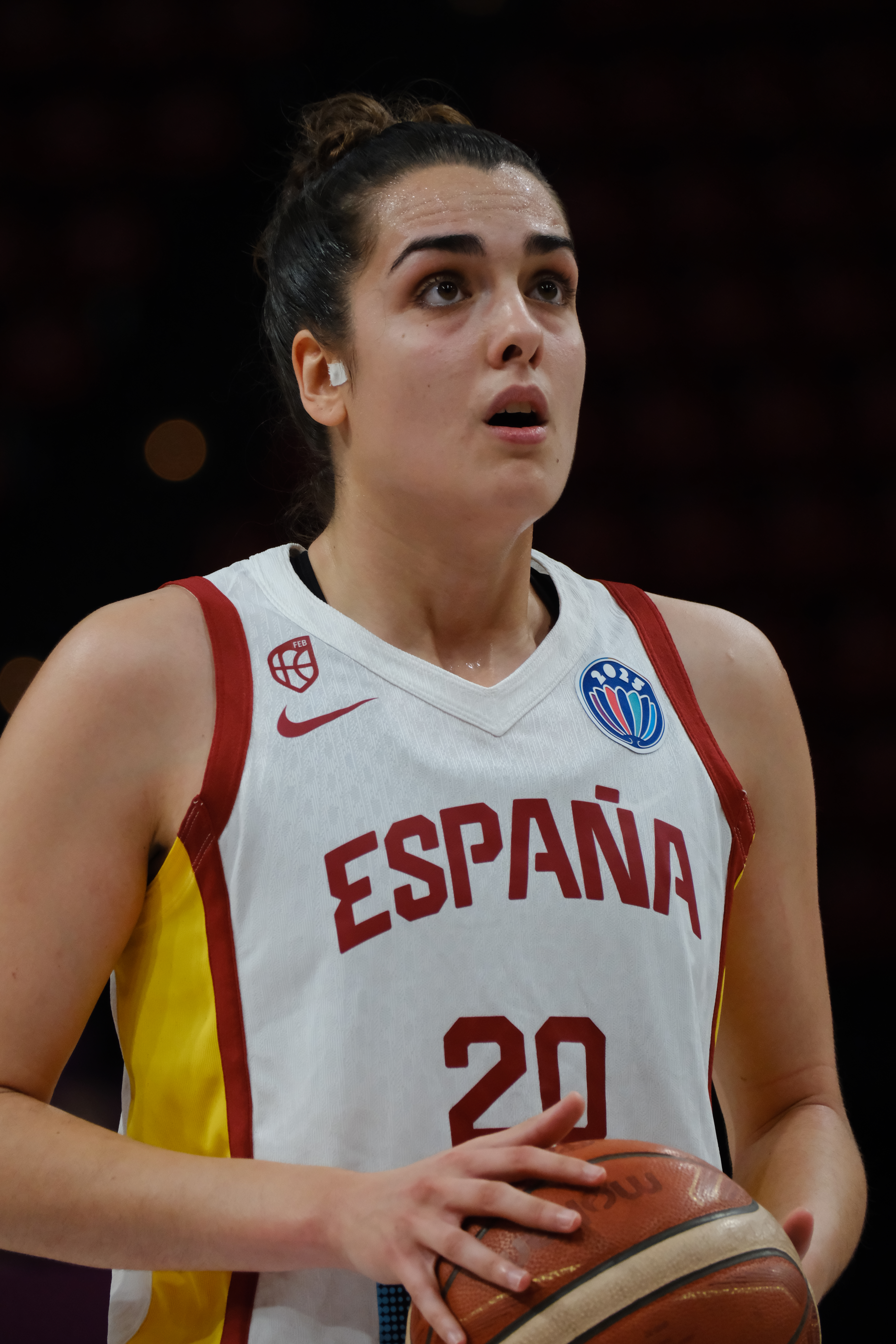
- Paula Ginzo in 2025

Personal information
- Born: 16 February 1998 (age 28) Santoña, Cantabria, Spain
- Listed height: 1.89 m (6 ft 2 in)

Paula Ginzo Arantes (born 16 February 1998) is a Spanish basketball player. She represented Spain at the 2024 Summer Olympics.
