= Miwa Kuribayashi =

Japanese basketball player

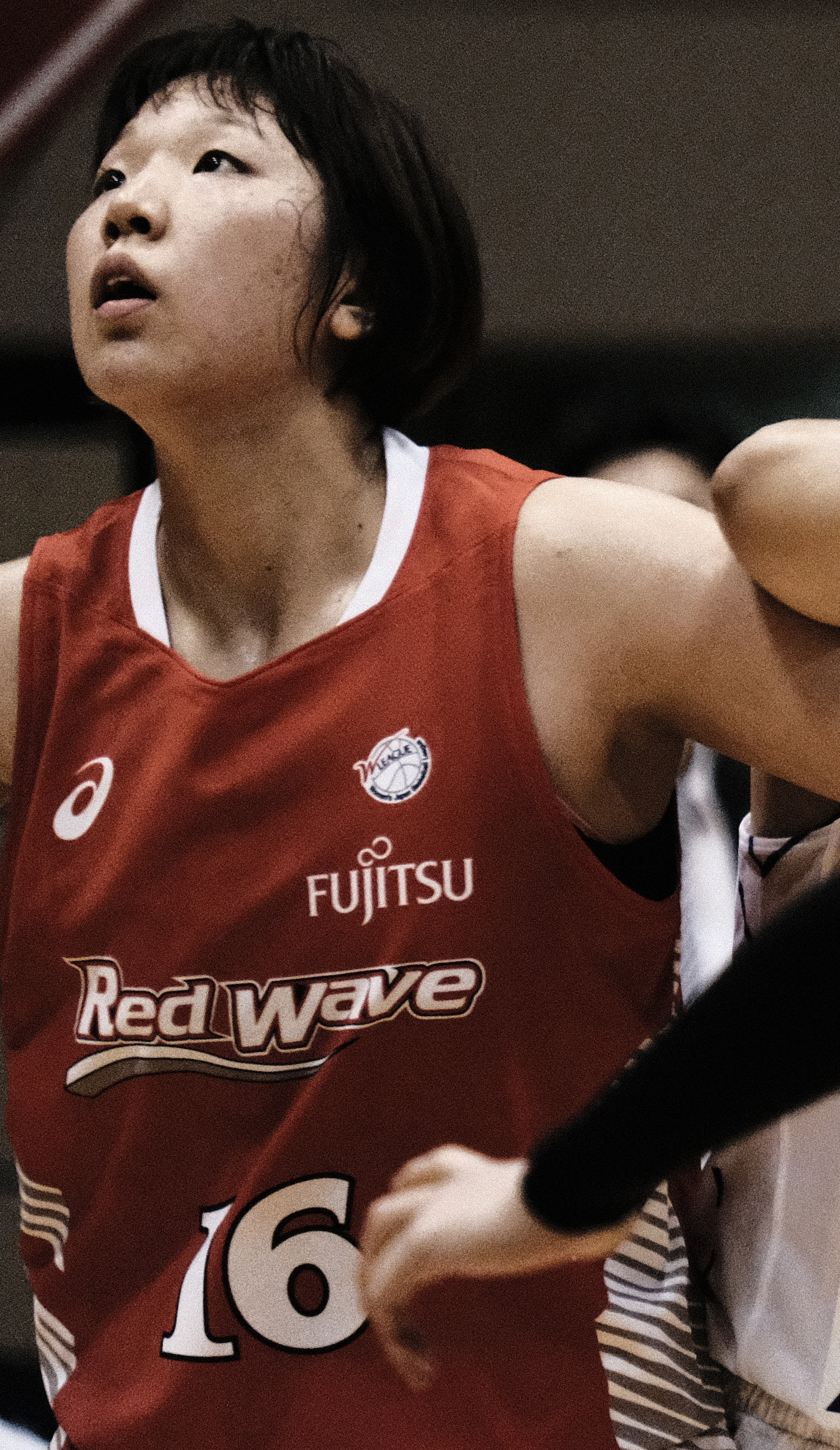

No. 16 – Fujitsu Red Wave
- Position: Center
- League: Women's Japan Basketball League, FIBA 3X3

Personal information
- Born: August 26, 1998 (age 28) Kiyota-ku, Sapporo
- Listed height: 6 ft 2 in (1.88 m)
- Listed weight: 183 lb (83 kg)

Career information
- High school: Sapporo Yamanote (Nishi-ku, Sapporo)
- Playing career: 2017–present

Career history
- 2017-present: Fujitsu Red Wave
Medals
Women's basketball
Representing Japan
Asia Cup
Silver medal – second place	2025 China
FIBA Asia Under-18 Championship for Women
Silver medal – second place	2016 Bangkok	Japan U18
Women's 3x3 basketball
FIBA 3x3 Under-23 World Cup
Silver medal – second place	2018 Xi'an	Japan 3x3

Miwa Kuribayashi (栗林未和, Kuribayashi Miwa; born August 26, 1998) is a Japanese professional basketball player who plays for Fujitsu Red Wave of the Women's Japan Basketball League . She also plays for Japan women's national 3x3 team. She brought the U23 national team to a silver medal at the FIBA 3x3 Under-23 World Cup in Xi'an .
