= Réka Lelik =

Hungarian basketball player (born 1999)

- Lelik in 2026

No. 13 – Emlak Konut
- Position: Shooting guard
- League: Turkish Super League; EuroLeague Women

Personal information
- Born: 14 April 1999 (age 27) Budapest, Hungary
- Listed height: 5 ft 10 in (1.78 m)

Career history
- 2016–2017: BEAC Újbuda
- 2017–2018: VBW CEKK Cegléd
- 2018–2022: Csata TKK
- 2022–2023: Castors Braine
- 2023–2026: DVTK HUN-Therm
- 2026–present: Emlak Konut

Réka Lelik (born 14 April 1999) is a Hungarian basketball player for Emlak Konut of the Turkish Super League.

== Professional career ==
Lelik began her senior career with BEAC Újbuda during the 2016–17 season. In her first season in the Hungarian top division, she appeared in 17 games and averaged 8.7 points, 3.1 rebounds and 2.5 assists per game. She also played for ELTE-BEAC Újbuda in the Hungarian amateur competition during the same season.

In the 2017–18 season, Lelik moved to VBW CEKK Cegléd, where she made her debut in European club competition. She played four games in the EuroCup Women, averaging 1.5 points, 1.5 rebounds and 0.3 assists per game. During the same season, she also appeared for Csata DSE in the Hungarian amateur league.

Lelik subsequently established herself at NKE-FCSM Csata. In the 2018–19 season, she averaged 13.7 points, 3.6 rebounds and 3.5 assists per game in the Hungarian league. Her production increased further in 2019–20, when she averaged 14.6 points, 3.2 rebounds and 4.9 assists in the Hungarian league. The club was subsequently known as Ludovika-FCSM Csata, with Lelik remaining with the team. In the 2020–21 season, she averaged 15.3 points, 3.1 rebounds and 3.1 assists per game, while in 2021–22 she averaged 14.6 points, 5.0 rebounds and 3.4 assists in the regular season. She also made her EuroCup Women debut with Csata during the 2021–22 season, averaging 11.4 points, 4.9 rebounds and 2.6 assists in 8 games.

In June 2022, Lelik left Csata to join Castors Braine in Belgium, marking her first move abroad. She spent the 2022–23 season with the Belgian club and competed in the EuroCup Women, averaging 13.2 points, 5.2 rebounds and 3.6 assists in 9 games.

In June 2023, Lelik returned to Hungary, signing with DVTK HUN-Therm. DVTK officially listed her among the club's incoming players for the 2023–24 season after her season in Belgium. Lelik made her EuroLeague Women debut with DVTK during the 2023–24 season. She averaged 11.9 points, 5.2 rebounds and 3.4 assists over 19 EuroLeague games. In the Hungarian league that season, she averaged 10.7 points, 3.5 rebounds and 2.4 assists during the regular season. She remained with DVTK for the 2024–25 and 2025–26 seasons. In the 2024–25 EuroLeague season, she averaged 7.2 points, 4.3 rebounds and 4.2 assists in six games, while DVTK also competed in the EuroCup Women. In the 2025–26 EuroLeague season, she recorded career-best European averages of 11.5 points, 3.8 rebounds and 4.5 assists over 13 games.

In July 2026, Lelik joined Emlak Konut in Turkey. She subsequently helped Emlak Konut reach the 2026–27 EuroLeague Women regular season. In the EuroLeague qualification semifinal against Panathinaikos, she recorded 10 points, 10 assists and 9 rebounds, narrowly missing a triple-double. In the final against Spar Girona, Lelik scored 29 points, 2 rebounds and 4 assists, helping Emlak Konut secure qualification for the regular season.

== National team career ==
Lelik represented Hungary at several youth levels before making her senior debut in 2019. She represented Hungary at the EuroBasket Women 2019, EuroBasket Women 2023 and the 2026 FIBA Women's Basketball World Cup.
