= Angelique Rodríguez =

Puerto Rican diver

Personal information
- Nationality: Puerto Rican
- Born: 26 August 1975 (age 50) San Juan, Puerto Rico
- Height: 158 cm (5 ft 2 in)
- Weight: 52 kg (115 lb)

Sport
- Sport: Diving
- Event(s): springboard, platform diving

Angelique Rodríguez (born 26 August 1975) is a Puerto Rican diver. She competed at the 2000 Summer Olympics and the 2004 Summer Olympics in springboard and platform diving.

She served as a diving judge for the 2020 summer Olympics for both men and women in several rounds for both springboard and platform diving.
