= Salimatou Kourouma =

Malian female basketball player

Personal information
- Born: 25 September 1999 (age 27) Kati, Mali
- Listed height: 5 ft 11 in (1.80 m)

Career information
- High school: Life Prep Academy
- College: Grayson (2019–2021); Little Rock (2021–2023); Arizona (2023–2024); Oregon (2024–2025)
- Position: Forward

Career highlights
- OVC Player of the Year (2023); First-team All-OVC (2023)

Salimatou Kourouma (born September 25, 1999) is a forward basketball professional player who plays for Mali women's national basketball team and Arizona Wildcats.

== Personal life ==
Salimatou Kourouma parents are Souleymane Kourouma and Fatoumatou Guiro. She has two brothers and two sisters; Dramane and Karim, Batoma and Katiatou respectively.

== Career history ==
During Kourouma high school she played for Life Prep Academy where she earned HCAA all-state honors.

Before she begin her college career 2020-2021, she redshirted in 2019-2020 at Grayson College and then transferred to Arkansas-Little Rock in 2021-2022 where she earned Ohio Valley Conference Player of the Year after averaging 17.8 points per game in conference play.

Kourouma started playing for the Arizona Wildcats during the 2023-2024 season. She scored the first collegiate basket on their win over Point Loma Nazarene, 52-44. Kourouma have played 13 games at Arizona Wildcats with 9.5 points per game, 3.3 rebounds per game, 0.8 assist per game, 1.2 steals per game, 1.2 personal fouls and 1.4 turnovers in 21 minutes per game before been transferred to Oregon Duck's women's basketball.

== National team career ==
Kourouma started her basketball career with Mali national youth team on 2015 during the FIBA Africa U16 women's and started playing with Mali national senior team at the 2022 FIBA Women's Basketball World Cup.

She fought with Kamite Elisabeth Dabou during the 2022 FIBA Women's World Cup in Sydney, Australia after their 81-68 defeat against Serbia. On 27 September 2022 the players apologized for their fight. According to them, they said "it was not our intention and we were frustrated because of the loss. We are here to apologize to the world of basketball and FIBA World Cup".

== Career statistics ==
Legend
GP	Games played	GS	Games started	MPG	Minutes per game	RPG	Rebounds per game
APG	Assists per game	SPG	Steals per game	BPG	Blocks per game	PPG	Points per game
TO	Turnovers per game	FG%	Field-goal percentage	3P%	3-point field-goal percentage	FT%	Free-throw percentage
**Bold**	Career best	°	League leader

Year	Team	GP	GS	MPG	FG%	3P%	FT%	RPG	APG	SPG	BPG	TO	PPG
2021–22	Little Rock	**22**	**18**	**31.3**	40.0	**28.7**	**71.4**	5.9	0.6	1.3	0.5	3.3	**18.4**
2022–23	Little Rock	20	11	27.5	41.1	19.2	66.7	**7.0**	**1.0**	**2.7**	**1.1**	2.0	16.8
2023–24	Arizona	13	0	21.0	**49.0**	28.6	57.5	3.3	0.8	1.2	0.3	**1.4**	9.5
2024–25	Oregon	Did not play											
Career		55	29	27.5	41.6	25.7	67.2	5.7	0.8	1.8	0.7	2.3	15.7
