= Meral Abdelgawad =

Egyptian basketball player

Al Gezira Cairo
- Position: Guard

Personal information
- Born: November 13, 1998 (age 28) Cairo, Egypt
- Listed height: 184 cm (6 ft 0 in)

Meral Abdelgawad (born November 13, 1998) is an Egyptian basketball player who plays as Guard and hails from Cairo, Egypt. She has played for the national women's basketball team and Al Ahly SC. Abdelgawad pursued her college education at Western Kentucky University in the United States. She is 6 feet 0 inches tall.

== International career ==
=== Youth career ===
Youth career in the national team:

- In the 2017 FIBA U19 Women's Basketball World Cup, she played 7 games, averaging 17.4 points, 4.7 rebounds, 5.1 assists, and an efficiency rating of 15.1.
- During the 2016 Afrobasket U18 Women, she participated in 6 games, averaging 14 points, 3.2 rebounds, 2.8 assists, and an efficiency rating of 8.3.
- Overall, her total averages for the national team youth level are 15.1 points, 3.7 rebounds, 3.6 assists, and an efficiency rating of 10.6.

=== National team ===
Highlights of her senior career in the national team:

- In the 2023 FIBA Women's AfroBasket, she participated in 3 games, averaging 14 points, 3.3 rebounds, 4.3 assists, and an efficiency rating of 14.7.
- During the 2023 FIBA Women's AfroBasket qualifiers, she played 4 games, averaging 9 points, 5 rebounds, 2.5 assists, and an efficiency rating of 9.8.
- At the 2021 FIBA Women's Afrobasket – Qualifiers – Zone 5, she competed in 5 games, averaging 15 points, 3.4 rebounds, 5.8 assists, and an efficiency rating of 17.2.
- In the 2019 FIBA Women's Afrobasket, she played 6 games, averaging 6.5 points, 1.7 rebounds, 0.7 assists, and an efficiency rating of 2.5.
- During the 2019 FIBA Women's Afrobasket qualifiers, she participated in 5 games, averaging 9 points, 4 rebounds, 2.4 assists, and an efficiency rating of 10.4.
- In the 2017 FIBA Women's Afrobasket, she played 8 games, averaging 11.1 points, 3 rebounds, 2.5 assists, and an efficiency rating of 8.
- Overall, her total averages for the national team senior level are 10.8 points, 3.4 rebounds, 3 assists, and an efficiency rating of 10.4.
