= Radwa Sherif =

Egyptian basketball

Personal information
- Born: 1 February 1998 (age 28) Cairo, Egypt
- Listed height: 184 cm (6 ft 0 in)
- Position: Forward
Medals
Women's 3x3 basketball
Representing Egypt
FIBA 3x3 Africa Cup
Silver medal – second place	2025 Antananarivo	Team

Radwa Salem Ahmed Sherif (born 1 February 1998) is an Egyptian basketball player. She plays for the Egyptian women's basketball team and Sporting Club in Egypt. She is 6 foot 1 inch tall (184cm). She plays for Al Gezira, Cairo. Radwa Sherif is a native of 6th of October City,Giza Governorate, Egypt.

== Career ==
=== National Team Senior ===
Average Stats
Series	Year	Games	Points	Rebounds	Assists	Efficiency
Career			4.3	3.6	0.3	4.8
FIBA Women's AfroBasket	2023	3	2.7	5.3	0.3	5
FIBA Women's AfroBasket qualifiers	2023	5	8.6	3.6	0.4	8.2
FIBA Women's Afrobasket – Qualifiers – Zone 5	2021	4	2	2.5	0.3	1.8
FIBA Women's Afrobasket	2017	12	3.9	2.8	0.3	4

=== National Team Youth ===
Average stats
Career			6.4	5.4	0.7	7.3
FIBA U19 Women's Basketball World Cup	2017	7	9.9	8.4	0.7	9.3
Afrobasket U18 Women	2016	6	10	8.5	1.3	12.8
FIBA U19 Women's World Championship	2015	2	1	1.5	0	-1.5
FIBA U17 World Championship for Women	2014	4	0	0	0	-0.5
FIBA Africa U16 Championship for Women	2013	6	7.3	5.5	0.8	11.2
