= Adama Coulibaly (basketball) =

Malian basketball player (born 1998)

No. 12 – Saint-Louis Basket
- Position: Power forward
- League: BBL

Personal information
- Born: 25 January 1998 (age 28) Bamako, Mali
- Listed height: 1.85 m (6 ft 1 in)
- Listed weight: 65 kg (143 lb)

Adama Coulibaly (born 25 January 1998) is a Malian basketball player for Saint-Louis Basket and the Malian national team.

She represented Mali at the 2019 Women's Afrobasket.
