= Battle of al-Musalla =

1052 battle in Tunisia

Battle of Bab Tunis
- Part of Hilalian invasion of Ifriqiya
Date	21 April 1052
Location	Bab Tunis, Kairouan
Result	Hilalian Victory

Belligerents
Zirid Dynasty: Population of Kairouan	Banu Hilal

Casualties and losses
Heavy	None

Battle of al-Musalla, or Battle of Bab Tunis, was a military clash between the subjects of the Zirid Emirate from the people of Kairouan and the cavalry of Bani Hilal.

It was named so because of the presence of a musalla (a prayer place), near Bab Tunis, the site of the battle.

== Background ==
After the terrible defeat at the Battle of Haydaran, Al-Mu’izz ibn Badis withdrew to Kairouan and began taking measures to confront the Arabs. Seven days after the battle, Al-Mu’izz allowed people to plunder the crops around Kairouan. The next day, he evacuated the people of Al-Mansuriyya and replaced them with soldiers. The following day, the Arabs’ horses were closer, so Al-Mu’izz ordered his soldiers not to go out.

== Battle ==
When the Arabs arrived in April 21, 1052, they attacked Kairouan from the direction of Bab Tunis (Gate of Tunis). The people came out to defend their city, some carrying weapons and some bringing sticks "that could not even repel the weakest dogs". However, the Arab cavalry was superior with their swords and spears, so the people of Kairouan fell, and only the lucky ones survived, and the Arabs left no clothes on anyone they killed.

== Aftermath ==
After the battle, the families of the slain came out, took their dead, and held mourning ceremonies. This is how Ibn Sharaf describes the atmosphere:

Many strangers were left behind on the battlefield, and great numbers of people were wounded. The people beheld sights that stunned them—the hideousness of those wounds—so that hearts melted, entrails were torn apart, and bodies wasted away. Young women blackened their faces and shaved their heads in mourning for their fathers and brothers. Thus it was a day of calamities, hardships, and disasters. People had never witnessed its like in any other cities in bygone ages, and the people passed the night in grief and sorrow.

— Ibn Sharaf,

This is how Abu al-Salt described the event: “The Arabs advanced until they descended upon Kairouan, and war broke out there, and many people were killed between Raqqada and Al-Mansuriyya”. The Arab aggression against Kairouan continued until they entered it in the year 1057.
