= Souk Sidi Mahrez =

Coordinates: 36.804659°N 10.168401°E

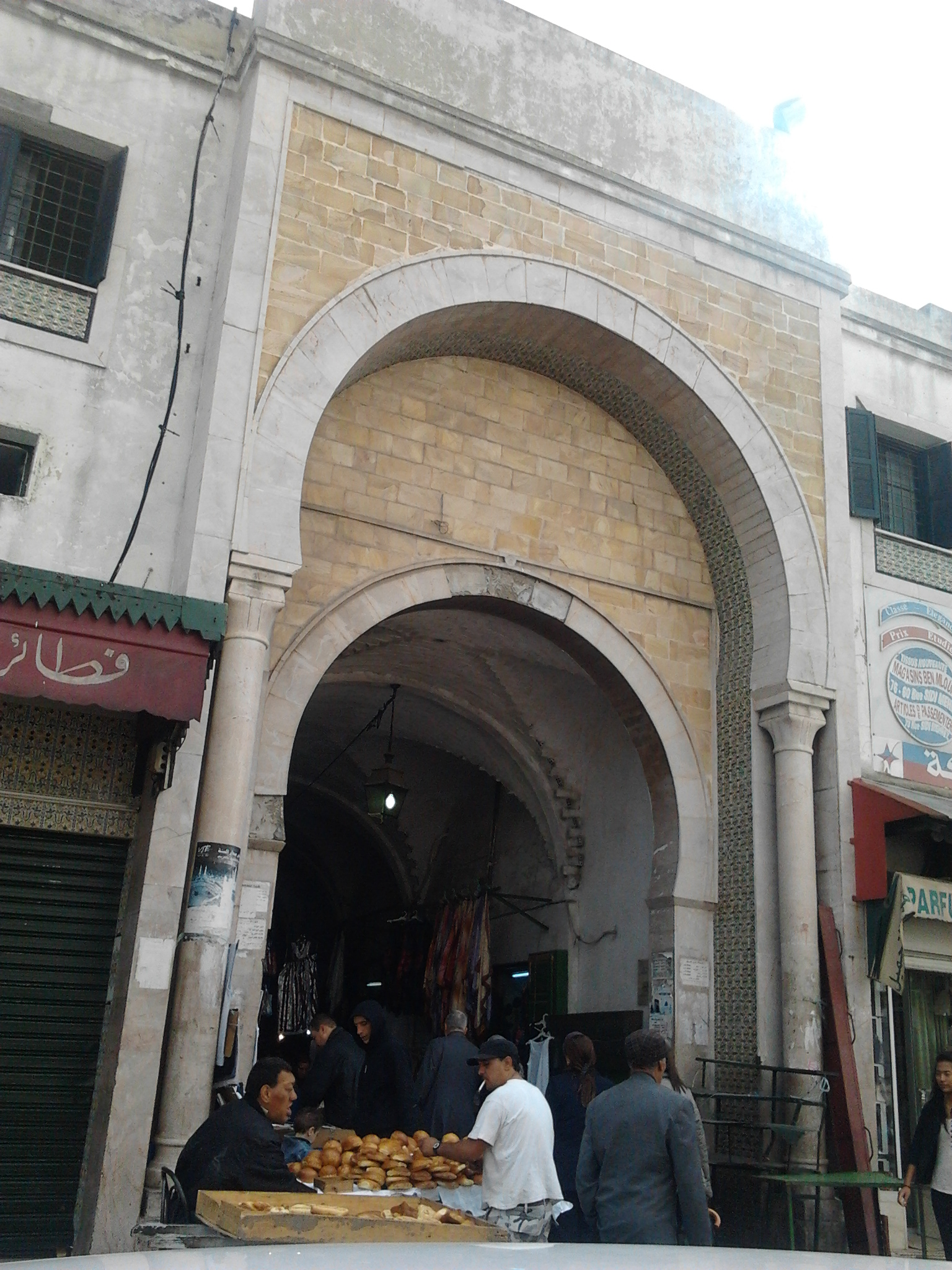
Entrance of Souk Sidi Mahrez

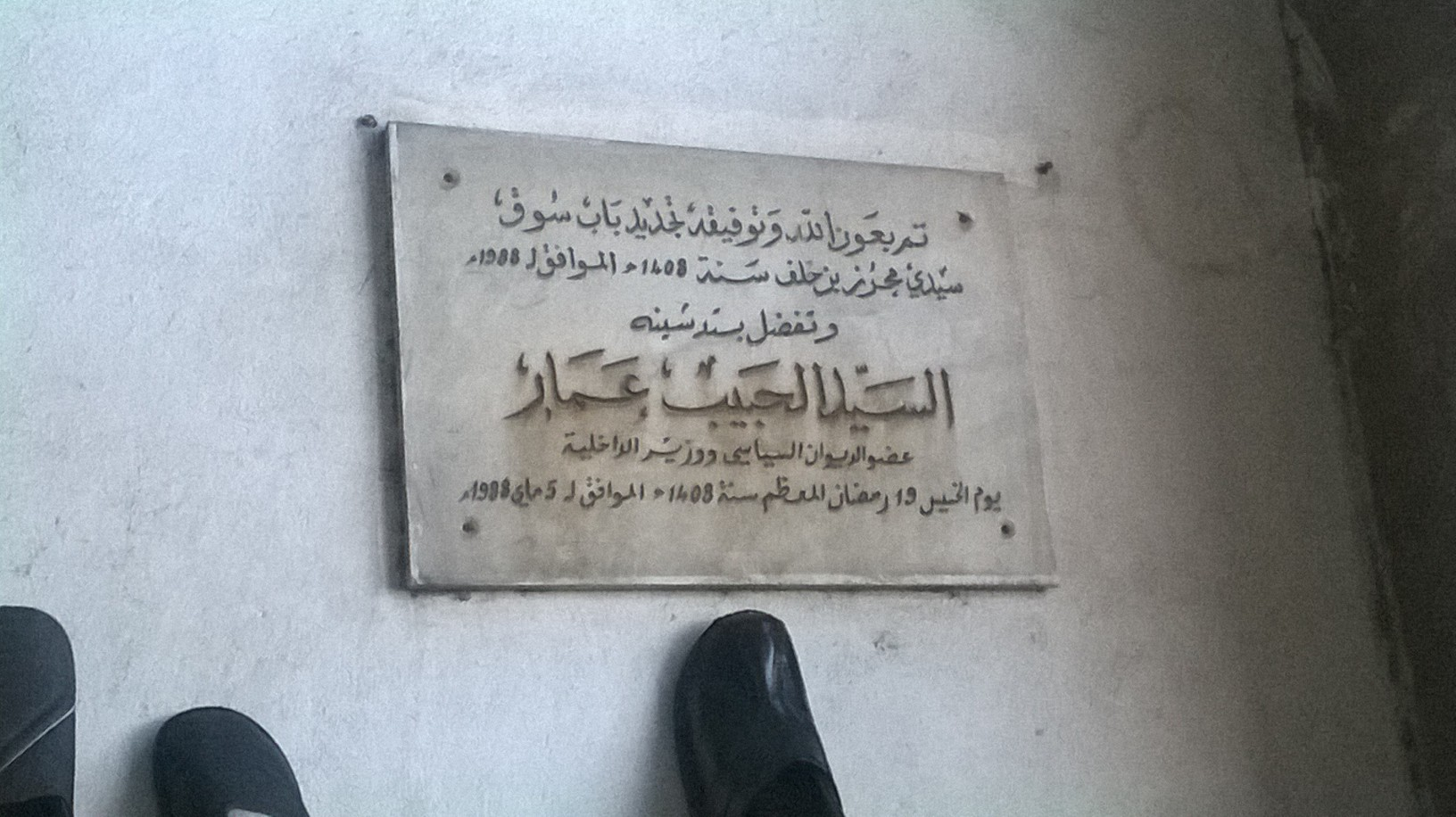
Commemorative sign at the entrance of the souk

Souk Sidi Mahrez (Arabic: سوق سيدي محرز) is one of the popular souks of the medina of Tunis. It is specialized in selling fabrics.

== Etymology ==
The souk got its name from the saint Sidi Mahrez Sultan of the medina whose real name is Cadhi Abou Mohamed Mahrez Ibn Khalaf.

== Location ==
It is located in Bab Souika suburb in the north of the medina, in Sidi Mahrez Street.

== Monuments ==
The souk has a zaouia (mausoleum) and a mosque, both with the name of the saint.

Sidi El Ghali Mosque is located near the entrance of the souk.

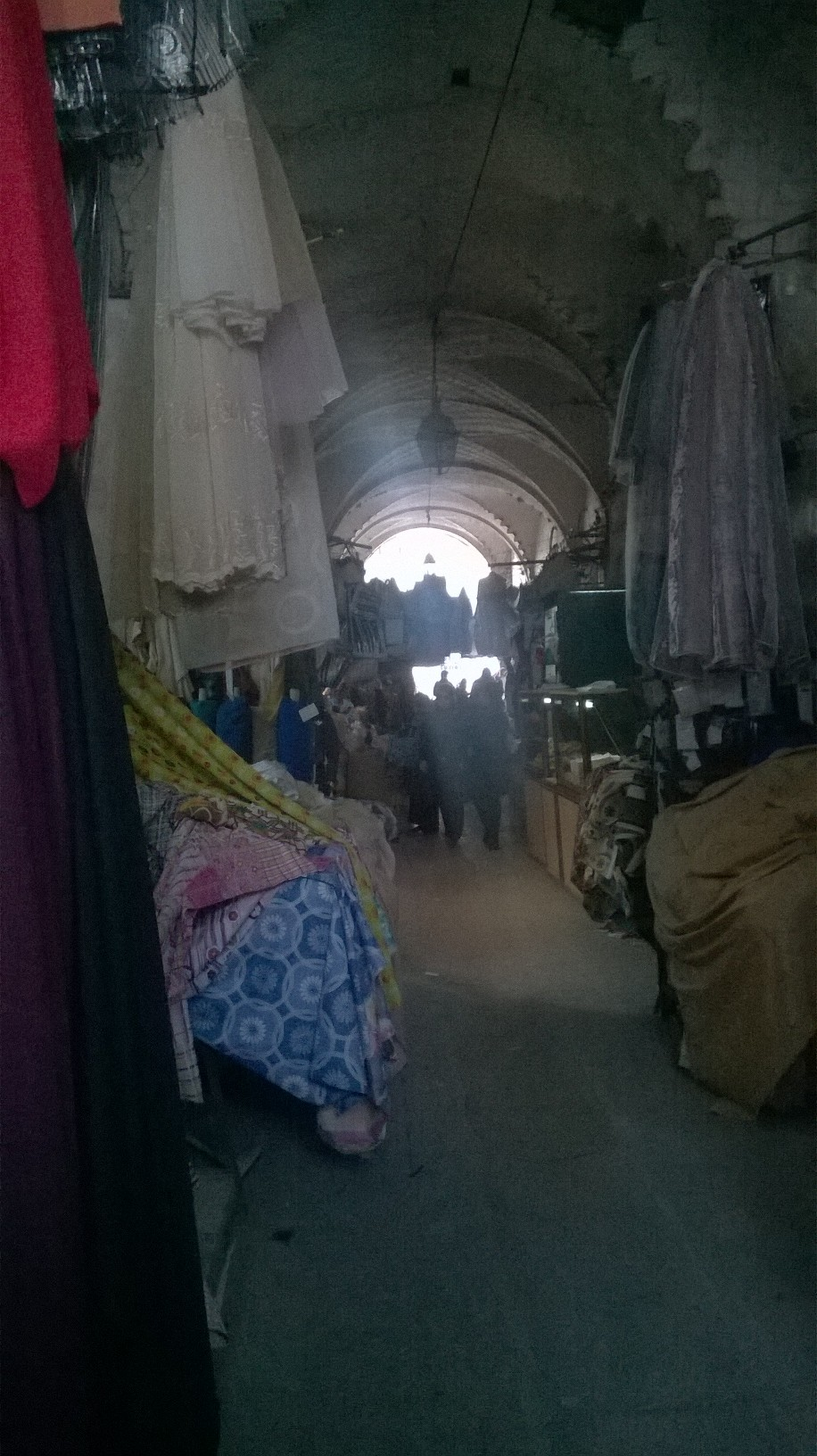
Alley of Souk Sidi Mahrez

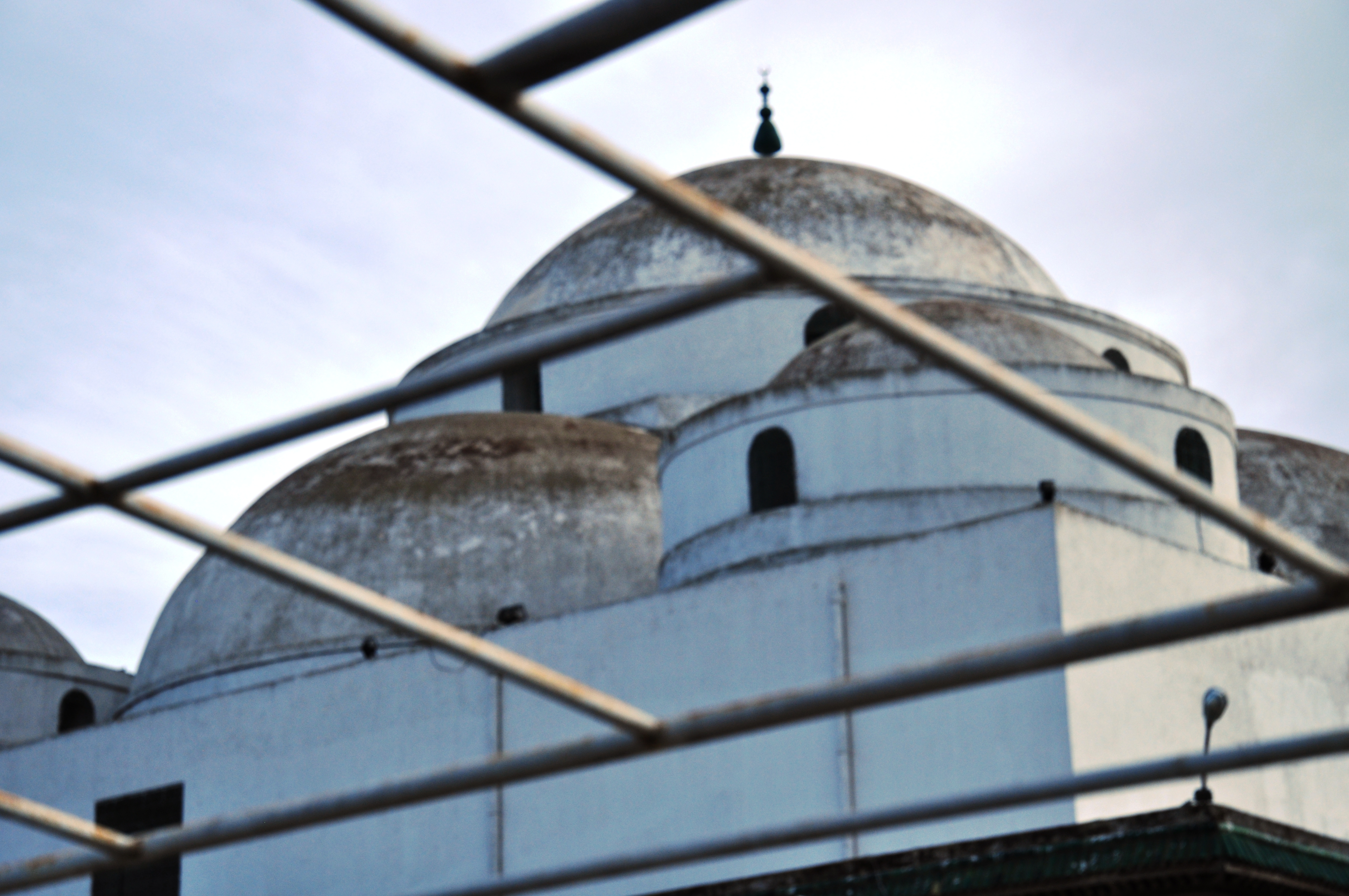
Sidi Mahrez Mosque

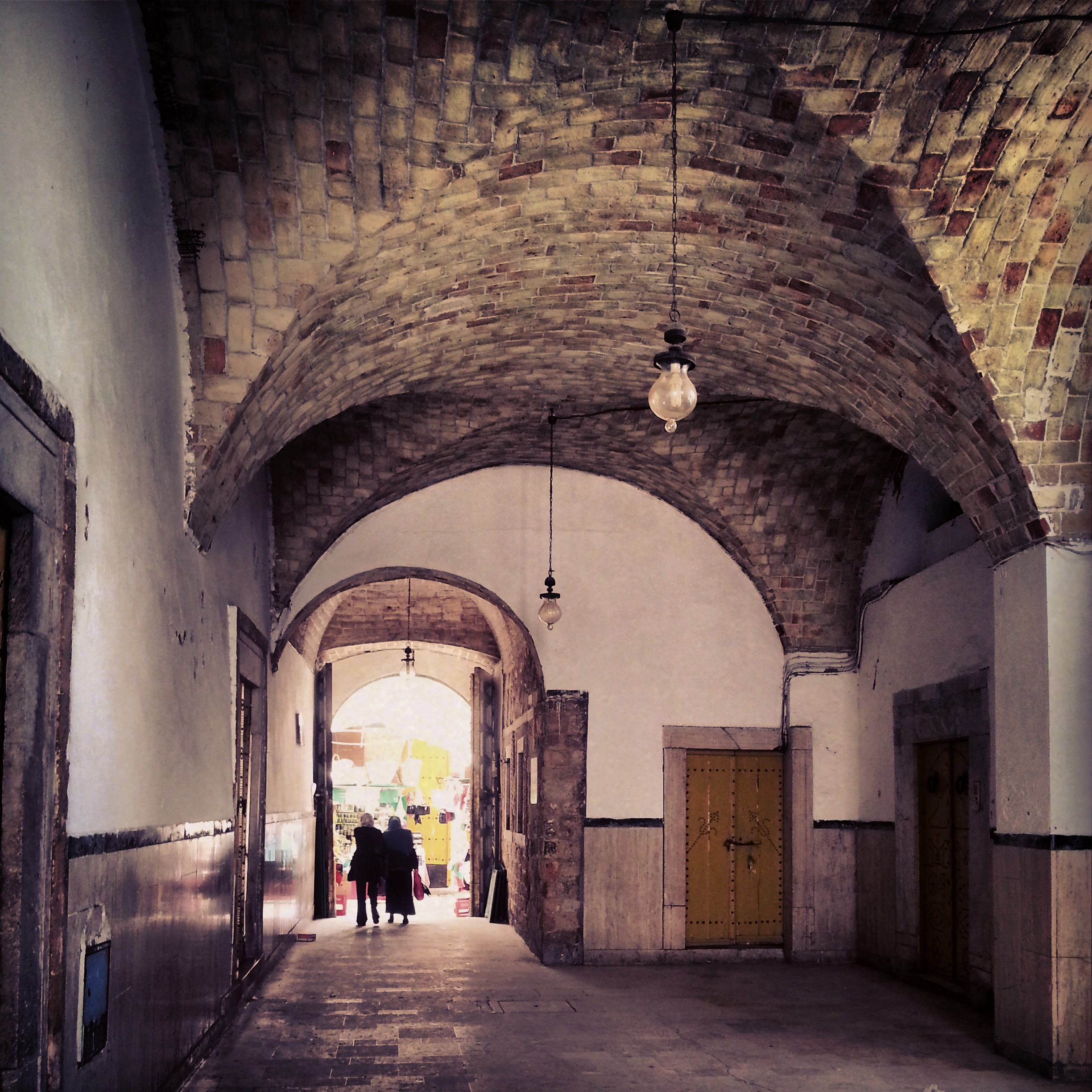
Alley leading for the mausoleum

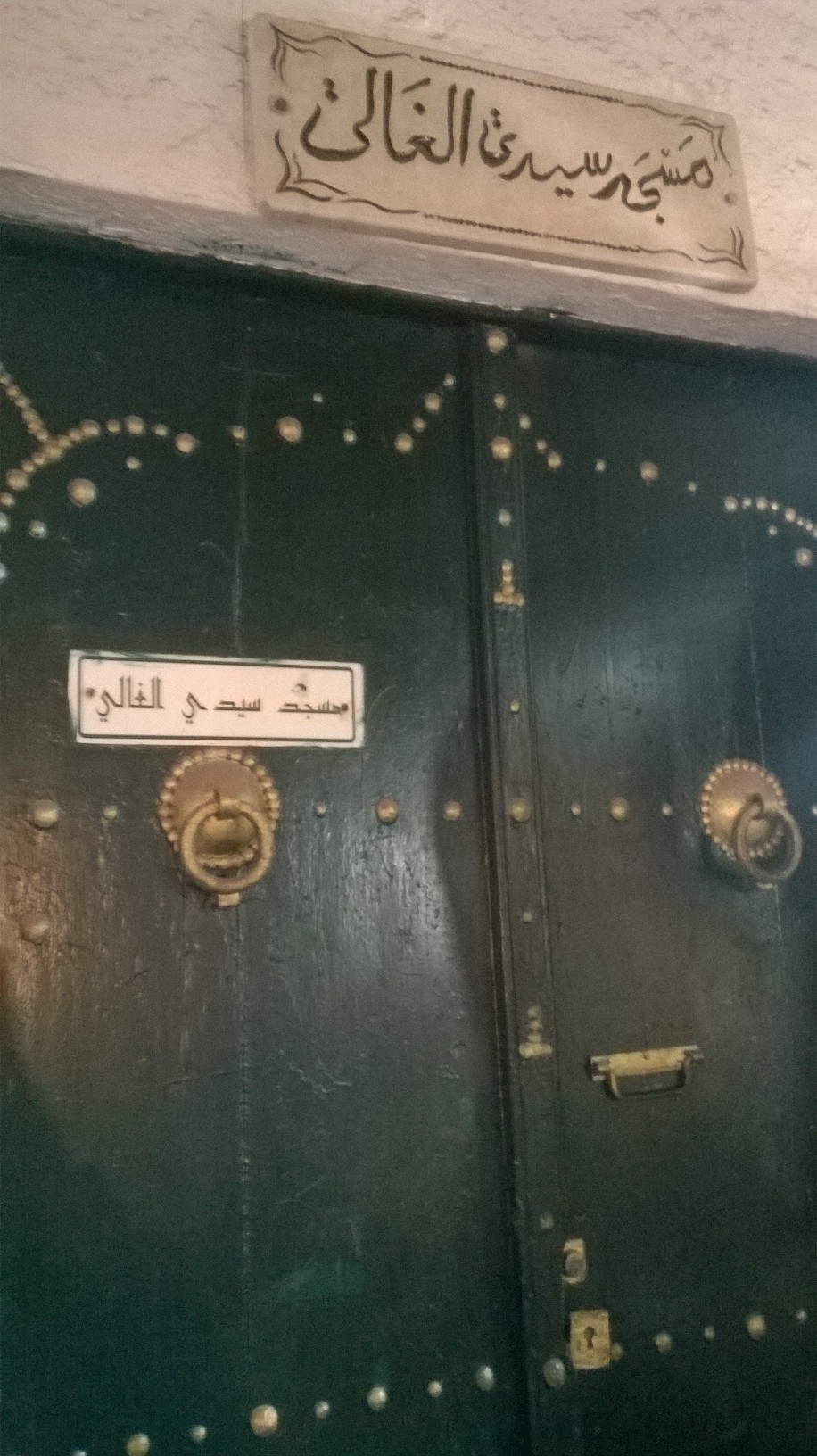
Entrance of Sidi El Ghali Mosque
