= 2004 FIBA Africa Under-18 Championship for Women =

2004 FIBA U18 Women's AfroBasket
7th FIBA Under-18 Women's African Basketball Championship

Tournament details
- Host country: Tunisia
- Dates: December 17–26, 2004
- Teams: 7 (from 1 confederation)
- Venue(s): 1 (in 1 host city)

Final positions
- Champions: Tunisia (1st title)

Tournament statistics
- Top scorer: (Democratic Republic of the Congo) Kalonda 19.2
- Top rebounds: (Democratic Republic of the Congo) Chambe 11.4
- Top assists: (Tunisia) Jebali 6.5
- PPG (Team): Tunisia 76.2
- RPG (Team): Tunisia 38
- APG (Team): Tunisia 17.3

Official website
- 2004 FIBA Africa Under-18 Championship for Women

The 2004 FIBA Africa Under-18 Championship for Women was the 7th FIBA Africa Under-18 Championship for Women, played under the rules of FIBA, the world governing body for basketball, and the FIBA Africa thereof. The tournament was hosted by Tunisia from December 17 to 26, 2004.

Tunisia ended the round-robin tournament with a 6–0 unbeaten record to win their first title and qualify, alongside DR Congo, for the 2005 FIBA U19 Women's World Cup.

== Participating teams ==
Angola
Central African Republic
DR Congo
Mali
Mozambique
South Africa
Tunisia

== Schedule ==
P	Team	M	W	L	PF	PA	Diff	Pts.
1	Tunisia	6	6	0	457	345	+112	12
2	DR Congo	6	5	1	407	338	+69	11
3	Mozambique	6	4	2	364	309	+55	10
4	Angola	6	3	3	329	346	-17	9
5	South Africa	6	2	4	322	368	-46	8
6	Mali	6	1	5	295	353	-58	7
7	Central African R.	6	0	6	287	402	-115	6

December 17

Tunisia	64–46	South Africa

Ben Arous

December 18

Mali	52–44	Central African Rep.

Ben Arous

Mozambique	62–37	Angola

Ben Arous

December 19

DR Congo	71–59	South Africa

Ben Arous

Tunisia	68–62	Mozambique

Ben Arous

Mali	48–59	Angola

Ben Arous

December 21

DR Congo	67–55	Mozambique

Ben Arous

Mali	54–75	Tunisia

Ben Arous

Central African Rep.	42–61	Angola

Ben Arous

December 22

South Africa	39–61	Mozambique

Ben Arous

Central African Rep.	44–91	Tunisia

Ben Arous

DR Congo	60–45	Mali

Ben Arous

December 23

South Africa	54–44	Mali

Ben Arous

Angola	61–75	Tunisia

Ben Arous

Central African Rep.	44–64	DR Congo

Ben Arous

December 25

South Africa	72–67	Central African Rep.

Ben Arous

Angola	51–67	DR Congo

Ben Arous

Mozambique	61–52	Mali

Ben Arous

December 26

Angola	60–52	South Africa

Ben Arous

Mozambique	62–46	Central African Rep.

Ben Arous

Tunisia	84–78	DR Congo

Ben Arous

== Final standings ==
Qualified for the 2005 FIBA U19 Women's World Cup

Rank	Team	Record
Gold medal	Tunisia	6–0
Silver medal	DR Congo	5–1
Bronze medal	Mozambique	4–2
4	Angola	3–3
5	South Africa	2–4
6	Mali	1–5
7	Central African R.	0–6

Tunisia roster
Emna Jlida, Fatma Jouini, Fatma Mahmoud, Hajer Hafsi, Mariem Ouertani, Maroua Boumenjel, Mouna Ghalleb, Nedra Dhouibi, Olfa Ouerghi, Samah Grioui, Saousen Jebali, Selma M'Nasria, Coach:

== Awards ==
2004 FIBA Africa Under-18 Championship for Women winner

Tunisia
First title

Most Valuable Player

== See also ==
- 2005 FIBA Africa Championship for Women
