= Abu al-Hasan al-Qabisi =

Abu ʾl-Ḥasan ʿAlī ibn Muḥammad ibn Khalaf al-Maʿāfirī al-Qābiṣī (Note: Arabic: أبو الحسن علي بن محمد القابسي المعافري. His nisba, al-Qābiṣī (also romanized al-Ḳābisī), means "one from Qabis". Sometimes it is given as a patronymic (nasab), Ibn al-Qābiṣī, i.e., "son of the one from Qabis".) (935–1012) (Note: These dates correspond to 324–403 AH.) was a leading Ifrīqiyan scholar (uṣūlī) of the Mālikī school of Islamic jurisprudence (fiḳh). In 996, he succeeded his first cousin Ibn Abī Zayd as leader (shaykh) of the school in al-Qayrawān (Kairouan).

Al-Qābiṣī's father was born in the village of al-Maʿāfiriyyīn near Qabis (Gabès) and his mother was from al-Qayrawān. According to oral tradition, he was the first cousin of Ibn Abī Zayd and Muḥriz ibn Khalaf, the sons of his mother's sisters. He was blind.

In Africa al-Qābiṣī was taught by Abu ʾl-ʿAbbās al-Ibyānī, a Shāfiʿī scholar from Tunis; Darrās al-Fāsī, an Ashʿarī; and Ibn Masrūr al-Dabbāgh. Accompanied by Darrās al-Fāsī and the Andalusian al-Aṣīlī, he went on a lengthy riḥla (journey) in the east from 963 until 968. (Note: 352–57 AH.) During his journey, because he was blind, his companions acted as his secretaries.

Before he took up jurisprudence, al-Qābiṣī taught qirāʾāt (recitation of the Qurʾān). As a jurist he was a traditionist with Ashʿarī leanings and partial to the writings of Ibn al-Mawwāz. He had deep knowledge of the ḥadīths. He helped spread the Ṣaḥīḥ of al-Bukhārī, a collection of ḥadīths, in northern Africa and wrote for it a riwāya, an account of its transmission. His other works include a collection of ḥadīths of the Muwaṭṭaʾ, popular in al-Andalus; a treatise on the conduct of schoolmasters, inspired by the writings of Saḥnūn; an incomplete collection of traditions of fiḳh; and numerous letters on everything from Qurʾānic exegesis, the architecture of ribāṭs, the rituals of the ḥajj, the theology of al-Ashʿarī and refuting the Bakrites (i.e., the Khārijites). In his old age, he is said to have introduced the young Ibn Sharaf to poetry.

Al-Qābiṣī's authority and reputation rose after the death of Ibn Abī Zayd (996) and Ibn Shiblūn (999) and he became the leading jurisconsult in northern Africa and al-Andalus. At the time of his death he was still teaching eighty students. His successors, who carried on his work, were Abū Bakr ibn ʿAbd al-Raḥmān and Abū Imrān al-Fāsī. The culmination of the work of these Mālikī scholars of al-Qayrawān was the triumph of the Mālikī school in Africa west of Egypt and the breach between the Mālikī Zīrids and the Shīʿa Fāṭimids.
