= Sidi Gouicem Mosque =

Mosque in Tunis, Tunisia

- جامع سيدي قويسم
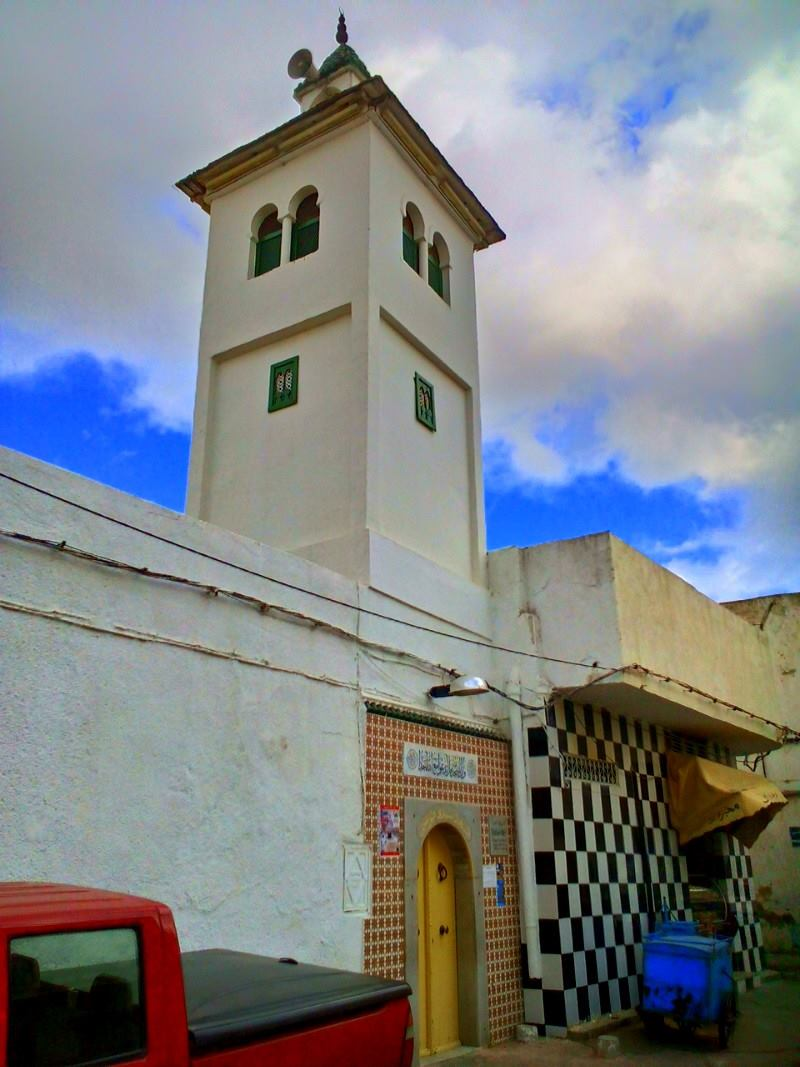

- Location within Tunisia

Religion
- Affiliation: Sunni Islam

Location
- Location: Tunis, Tunisia
- Coordinates: 36.809486°N 10.170876°E

Architecture
- Type: Mosque

Sidi Gouicem Mosque (Arabic: جامع سيدي قويسم), is a Tunisian mosque in the north of the medina of Tunis, in the Bab Souika suburb.

== Localization ==
- The mosque can be found in 39 Naceur Ben Jaafar Street.

== Etymology ==
It got its name from its founder, the cheikh Mohammed Gouicem El Nouaoui (Arabic: الشيخ محمد قويسم النواوي). He was born in 1623 and died in 1702. He used to teach Hadiths in the Sidi Mahrez Mosque.

== Description ==
According to the historian Mohamed Belkhodja, the founder of the mosque is buried there from the 18th century. The tomb has no inscription on it.

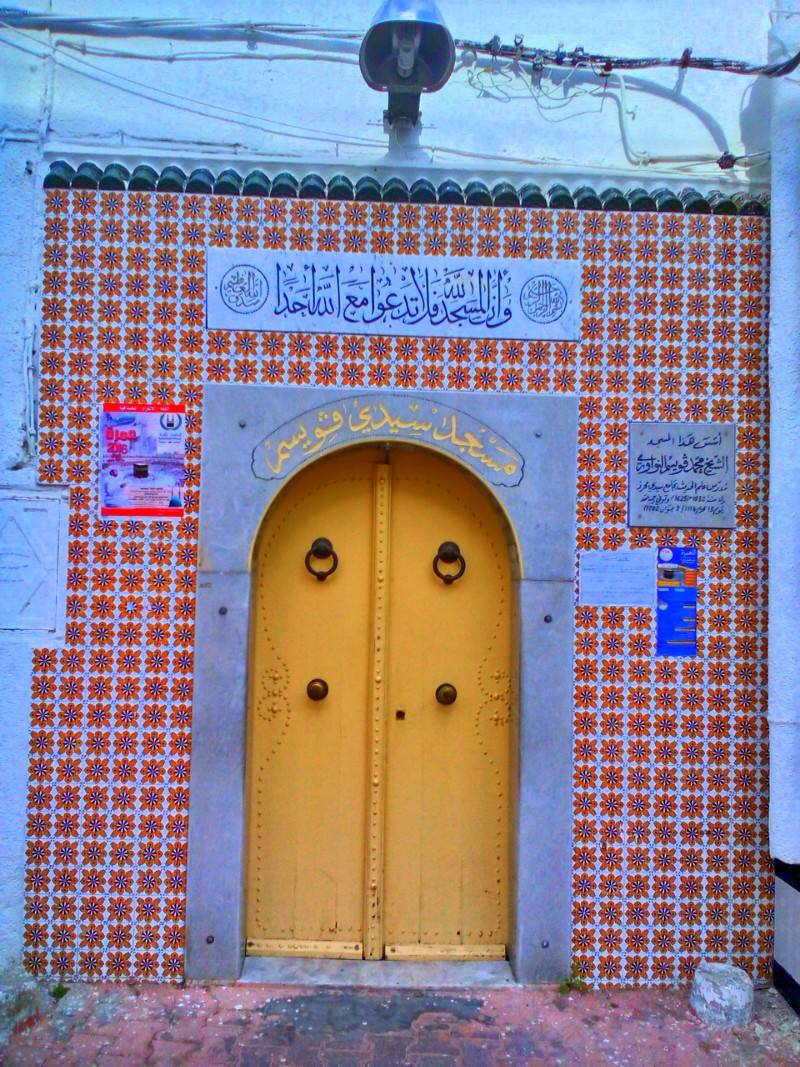
Entrance of the mosque

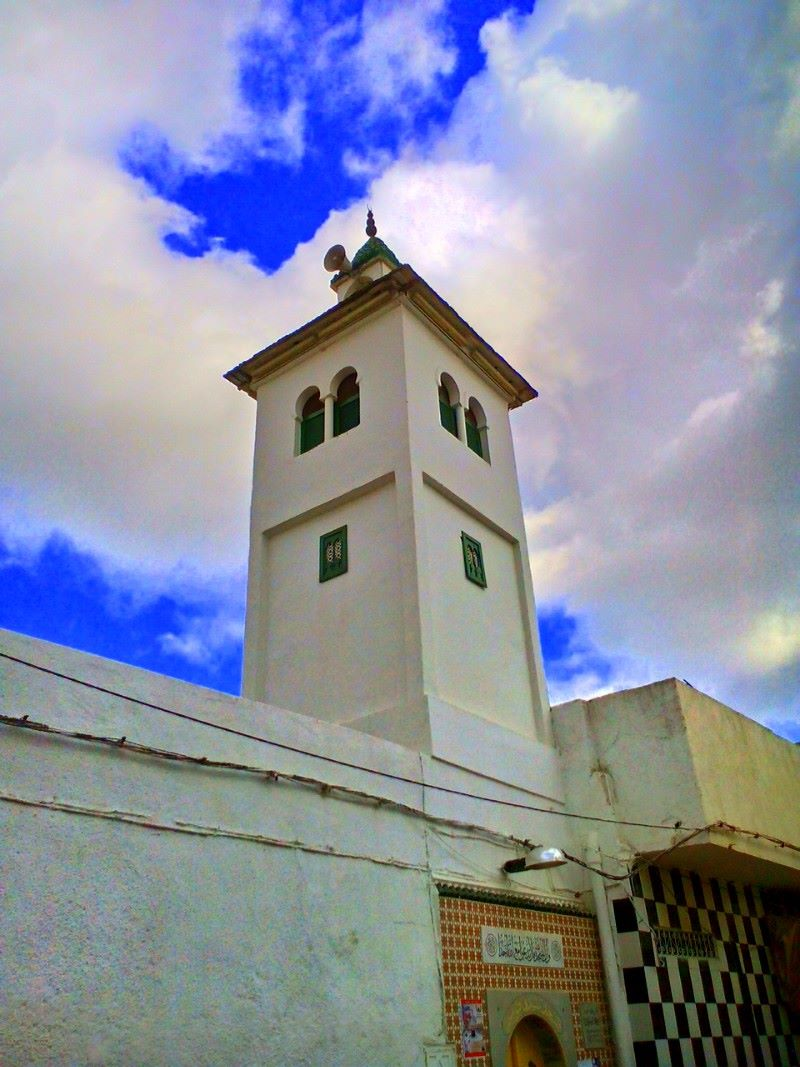
Minaret of the mosque

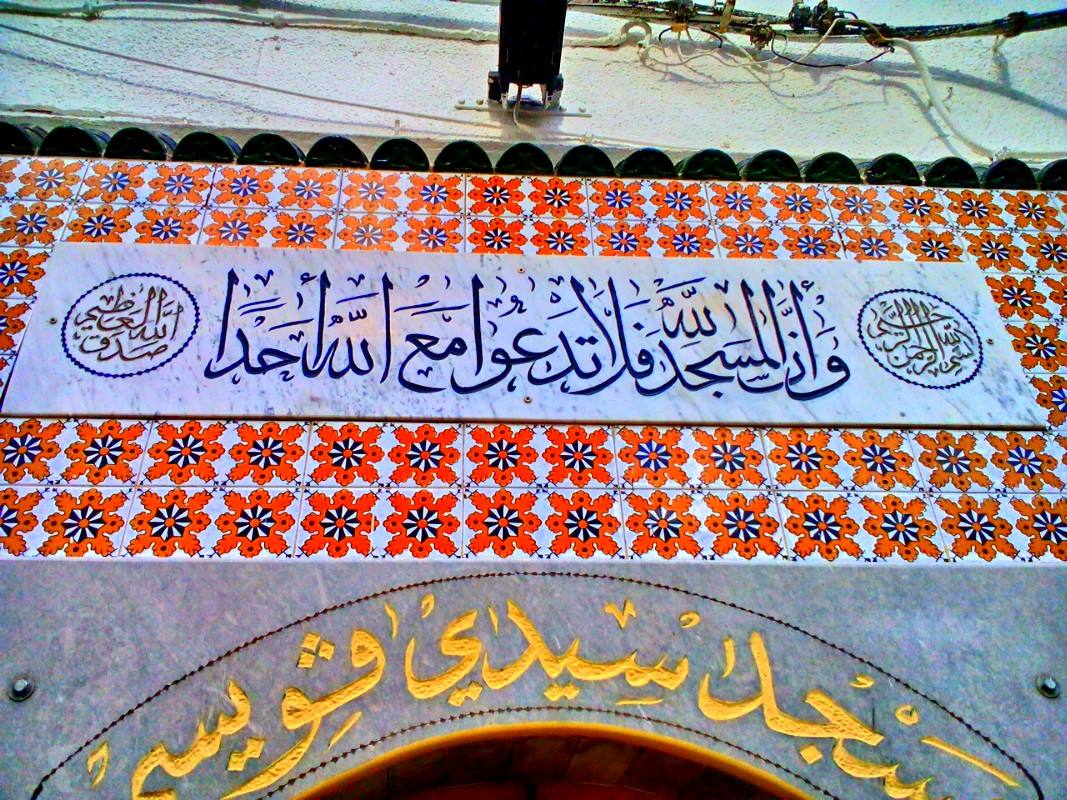
A quote from the coran written on the marble plaque

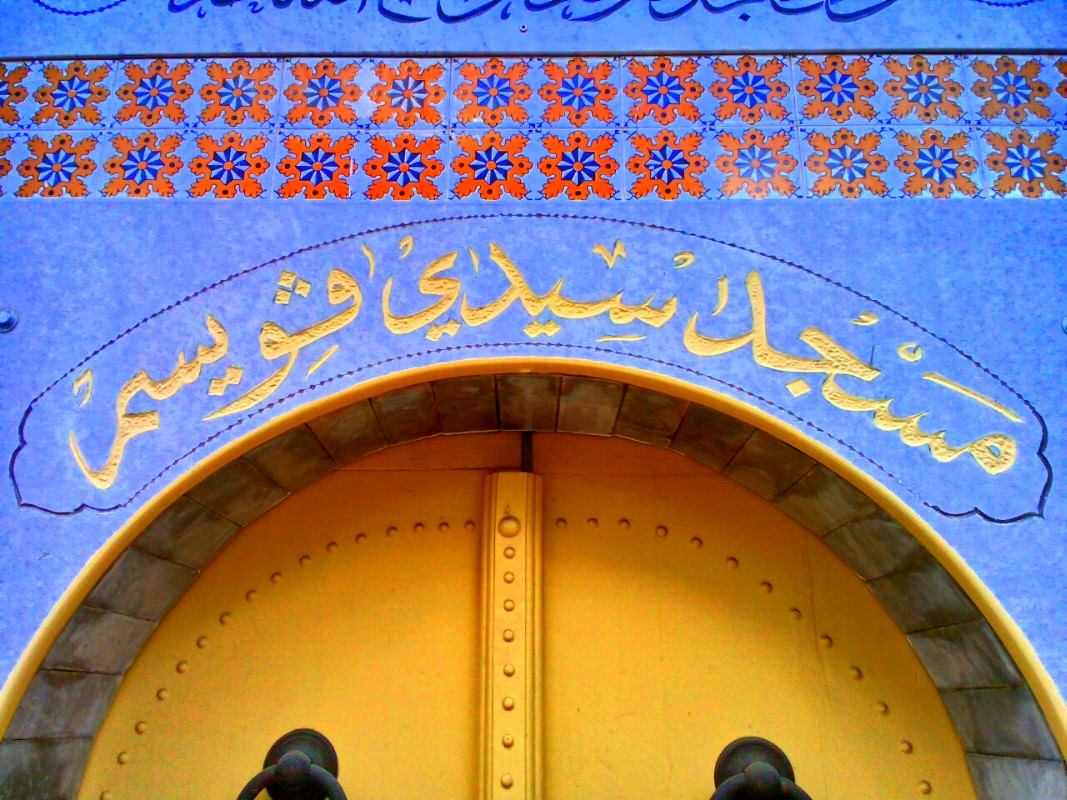
Marble plaque with the name of the mosque
