= 2018 FIBA U18 Women's African Championship =

2018 FIBA U18 Women's AfroBasket
14th FIBA Under-18 Women's African Basketball Championship

Tournament details
- Host country: Mozambique
- City: Maputo
- Dates: 10–19 August
- Teams: 8 (from 1 confederation)
- Venue: 1 (in 1 host city)

Final positions
- Champions: Mali (7th title)

Tournament statistics
- MVP: (Mali) Assetou Sissoko
- Top scorer: (Mali) Assetou Sissoko 22.0
- Top rebounds: (Democratic Republic of the Congo) Grace Basiki 14.2
- Top assists: (Mali) Awa Haidara 3.7
- PPG (Team): Mali 99.8
- RPG (Team): Mali 59.0
- APG (Team): Mali 20.7

Official website
- www.fiba.basketball

The 2018 FIBA U18 Women's African Championship was the 14th edition, played under the rules of FIBA, the world governing body for basketball, and the FIBA Africa thereof. The tournament was hosted by Mozambique from August 10 to 19, 2018 in Maputo.

== Hosts selection ==
On 23 March 2018, FIBA Africa Central Board announced that Maputo, Mozambique as the host city for the tournament.

== Venue ==
Maputo	2018 FIBA U18 Women's African Championship is located in Mozambique
Pavilhão do Maxaquene (Capacity: ?)	2018 FIBA U18 Women's African Championship is located in Mozambique
Image	2018 FIBA U18 Women's African Championship is located in Mozambique

== Draw ==
The draw for this tournament took place on 9 August 2018 at the Resotel Hotel in Maputo.

== Qualification ==
Event	Date	Location	Vacancies	Qualified
2018 AfroBasket U18 Women Preliminaries Zone 1	Unknown	(Algeria) Unknown	1	
2018 AfroBasket U18 Women Preliminaries Zone 2	Cancelled (Note: No competition as there is no team registered.)	NA	1	Mali
2018 AfroBasket U18 Women Preliminaries Zone 3	Unknown	(Ghana) Unknown	1	NA
2018 AfroBasket U18 Women Preliminaries Zone 4	Unknown	Unknown	1	NA
2018 AfroBasket U18 Women Preliminaries Zone 5	17–22 June 2018 (Note: Three countries participated: hosts Tanzania, Uganda and the eventual zone winner Rwanda. The tournament was played in round-robin format. Uganda later received a wild card.)	(Tanzania) Dar es Salaam	1+1+1	Rwanda; Egypt; Uganda
2018 AfroBasket U18 Preliminaries Zone 6	Unknown (Note: Mozambique qualified as the tournament hosts.)	(Mozambique) Unknown	1+1	Mozambique; Angola
2018 AfroBasket U18 Preliminaries Zone 7	Unknown	Unknown	1	
Total			8	

== Qualified teams ==
- Mozambique − Tournament hosts
- Rwanda − Zone V Winner
- Egypt − Zone V
- Mali − Zone II
- Angola − Zone VI
- Uganda − Zone V Runners-Up/Wild Card
- Cape Verde
- DR Congo

== Preliminary round ==
The draw was held in Maputo, Mozambique on 9 August 2018.

All times are local (UTC+2).

=== Group A ===
Pos	Team	Pld	W	L	PF	PA	PD	Pts
1	Mozambique (H)	3	3	0	171	123	+48	6
2	Rwanda	3	2	1	149	122	+27	5
3	Egypt	3	1	2	138	134	+4	4
4	Cape Verde	3	0	3	95	174	−79	3

Source: FIBA Africa
(H) Hosts

10 August 2018
15:45

Boxscore

Rwanda	46–37	Egypt
Scoring by quarter: 16–7, 4–6, 12–12, 14–12
Pts: Bella Murekatete 13; Rebs: Bella Murekatete 21; Asts: Faustine Mwizerwa 5		Pts: Maya Abdelfattah 17; Rebs: Maya Abdelfattah 11; Asts: Samaa Omar 2

Pavilhão do Maxaquene, Maputo
Referees: Dorothy Judy Okatch (BWA), Osvaldo Antonio Fernandes Quaresma Neto (AGO), Mohamed Lamline Diawara (MLI)

10 August 2018
18:00

Boxscore

Cape Verde	32–61	Mozambique
Scoring by quarter: 5–18, 9–13, 4–13, 14–17
Pts: Joseana Vaz 19; Rebs: Joseana Vaz 9 Asts: Ashley Lima 2		Pts: Suraya Rijal 17; Rebs: Ester Gomes 11; Asts: Filipa Calisto 3

Pavilhão do Maxaquene, Maputo
Referees: Walelign Fikadu Gebeto (ETH), Zophila Emmanuel Mthembu (ZAF), Monicca Nassuuna (UGA)

12 August 2018
15:45

Boxscore

Egypt	56–31	Cape Verde
Scoring by quarter: 14–10, 12–3, 19–14, 11–4
Pts: Nouran Ibrahim 13; Rebs: Reim Abdelalim 9 Asts: Hana Ismail 3		Pts: Joseana Vaz 18; Rebs: Joseana Vaz 12; Asts: Joseana Vaz 2

Pavilhão do Maxaquene, Maputo
Referees: Dorothy Judy Okatch (BWA), NTELA, Mbayi Christian Ntela (COD), Vinsencia Dyanda (ZWE)

12 August 2018
18:00

Boxscore

Mozambique	53–46	Rwanda
Scoring by quarter: 13–1, 4–18, 10–18, 26–9
Pts: Ester Gomes 16; Rebs: Suraya Rijal 13; Asts: Ester Gomes 4		Pts: Bella Murekatete 14; Rebs: Bella Murekatete 13; Asts: Faustine Mwizerwa, Ineza Sifa 2

Pavilhão do Maxaquene, Maputo
Referees: Zophila Emmanuel Mthembu (ZAF), Monicca Nassuuna (UGA), Mohamed Lamline Diawara (MLI)

14 August 2018
15:45

Boxscore

Cape Verde	32–57	Rwanda
Scoring by quarter: 6–22, 11–11, 4–12, 11–12
Pts: Joseana Vaz 11; Rebs: Joseana Vaz 11; Asts: Joseana Vaz 4		Pts: Bella Murekatete 34; Rebs: Bella Murekatete, Hope Butera 22; Asts: Hope Butera 5

Pavilhão do Maxaquene, Maputo
Referees: Zophila Emmanuel Mthembu (ZAF), Osvaldo Antonio Fernandes Quaresma Neto (AGO), Mbayi Christian Ntela (COD)

14 August 2018
18:00

Boxscore

Mozambique	57–45	Egypt
Scoring by quarter: 16–11, 18–16, 11–9, 12–9
Pts: Filipa Calisto 21; Rebs: Suraya Rijal 12; Asts: Ester Gomes 3		Pts: Reim Abdelalim 11; Rebs: Reim Abdelalim 7 Asts: six players 1

Pavilhão do Maxaquene, Maputo
Referees: Walelign Fikadu Gebeto (ETH), Monicca Nassuuna (UGA), Mohamed Lamline Diawara (MLI)

=== Group B ===
Pos	Team	Pld	W	L	PF	PA	PD	Pts
1	Mali	3	3	0	311	116	+195	6
2	Angola	3	2	1	163	136	+27	5
3	DR Congo	3	1	2	108	197	−89	4
4	Uganda	3	0	3	110	243	−133	3

Source: FIBA Africa

11 August 2018
15:45

Boxscore

Uganda	29–63	Angola
Scoring by quarter: 7–21, 3–0, 12–29, 7–13
Pts: Fildauce Namulema 13; Rebs: four players 4 Asts: Ramurah Nakato 1		Pts: Antonia Luis Miguel 15; Rebs: Julia Francisco, Isabel Fernando 3 Asts: Marioneth Silva 1

Pavilhão do Maxaquene, Maputo
Referees: Walelign Fikadu Gebeto (ETH), OKATCH, Dorothy Judy Okatch (BWA), Vinsencia Dyanda (ZWE)

11 August 2018
18:00

Boxscore

DR Congo	33–99	Mali
Scoring by quarter: 7–15, 8–27, 7–33, 11–24
Pts: Naomie Bonga 19; Rebs: Tania Longomo Kokolo 6 Asts: Tania Longomo Kokolo 4		Pts: Assetou Sissoko 22; Rebs: Sika Koné, Aminata Traore 11; Asts: three players 4

Pavilhão do Maxaquene, Maputo
Referees: Artur Cesar Bandeira De Castro (MOZ), Aya Khaled Abdelmohsed Ahmed (EGY), Didier Gaga (RWA)

13 August 2018
15:45

Boxscore

Mali	132–39	Uganda
Scoring by quarter: 31–4, 33–6, 27–12, 41–17
Pts: Gnere Alima Dembele 23; Rebs: Gnere Alima Dembele 6 Asts: Fatoumata Traore 5		Pts: Martha Nandutu 10; Rebs: Ramurah Nakato 5 Asts: Ramurah Nakato 2

Pavilhão do Maxaquene, Maputo
Referees: Artur Cesar Bandeira De Castro (MOZ), Didier Gaga (RWA), Vinsencia Dyanda (ZWE)

13 August 2018
18:00

Boxscore

Angola	56–27	DR Congo
Scoring by quarter: 13–7, 19–6, 13–7, 11–7
Pts: Alexia Shanice dos Santos Dizeko 14; Rebs: Julia Francisco, Antonieta da Silva Vidal 11; Asts: Alexia Shanice dos Santos Dizeko 4		Pts: Marceline Mwakekesa, Naomie Bonga 8 Rebs: three players 8 Asts: Ketia Mbelu, Naomie Bonga 2

Pavilhão do Maxaquene, Maputo
Referees: Walelign Fikadu Gebeto (ETH), Dorothy Judy Okatch (BWA), Aya Khaled Abdelmohsed Ahmed (EGY)

15 August 2018
15:45

Boxscore

DR Congo	48–42	Uganda
Scoring by quarter: 7–15, 14–14, 11–11, 16–2
Pts: Deborah Mayimona Kaba 14; Rebs: Grace Basiki 11; Asts: Ketia Mbelu 3		Pts: Alice Winnie Isoto 16; Rebs: Ramurah Nakato 13; Asts: Fildauce Namulema 3

Pavilhão do Maxaquene, Maputo
Referees: Dorothy Judy Okatch (BWA), Didier Gaga (RWA), Vinsencia Dyanda (ZWE)

15 August 2018
18:00

Boxscore

Mali	80–44	Angola
Scoring by quarter: 16–13, 28–12, 16–9, 20–10
Pts: Assetou Sissoko 20; Rebs: Assetou Sissoko 11; Asts: Awa Haidara, Gnere Alima Dembele 4		Pts: Antonia Luis Miguel 8 Rebs: Julia Francisco, Antonieta da Silva Vidal 6 Asts: three players 1

Pavilhão do Maxaquene, Maputo
Referees: Artur Cesar Bandeira de Castro (MOZ), Walelign Fikadu Gebeto (ETH), Aya Khaled Abdelmohsed Ahmed (EGY)

== Final round ==
=== Bracket ===
Fifth place
A3	Egypt	43
A2	Cape Verde	38
Seventh place
A1	Uganda	38
A4	DR Congo	48

5–8th place semifinals
A1	Uganda	43
A3	Egypt	69
A2	Cape Verde	61
A4	DR Congo	56

Quarterfinals
A1	Uganda	31
B4	Mozambique	86
A3	Egypt	38
B2	Angola	54
A2	Cape Verde	21
B3	Mali	78
A4	DR Congo	44
B1	Rwanda	49

Semifinals
B4	Mozambique	53
B2	Angola	49
B3	Mali	124
B1	Rwanda	27

Final
B4	Mozambique	33
B3	Mali	86
Bronze medal match
B2	Angola	59
B1	Rwanda	46

=== Quarterfinals ===
17 August
12:15

Boxscore

Cape Verde	21–78	Mali
Scoring by quarter: 5–14, 4–11, 5–25, 7–28
Pts: Joseana Vaz 15; Rebs: Joseana Vaz, Camilla Nascimiento 7 Asts: Camilla Nascimiento 3		Pts: Gnere Alima Dembele 25; Rebs: Aminata Brahima Sangare 10; Asts: Assetou Sissoko 4

Pavilhão do Maxaquene, Maputo
Referees: Monicca Nassuuna (UGA), Didier Gaga (RWA), Mbayi Christian Ntela (COD)

17 August
14:30

Boxscore

DR Congo	44–49	Rwanda
Scoring by quarter: 11–15, 10–9, 9–9, 14–16
Pts: Naomie Bonga 18; Rebs: Grace Basiki 16; Asts: Ketia Mbelu 3		Pts: Bella Murekatete 14; Rebs: Bella Murekatete 11; Asts: Faustine Mwizerwa 5

Pavilhão do Maxaquene, Maputo
Referees: Aya Khaled Abdelmohsed Ahmed (EGY), Artur Cesar Bandeira de Castro (MOZ), Vinsencia Dyanda (ZWE)

17 August
16:45

Boxscore

Egypt	38–54	Angola
Scoring by quarter: 7–13, 9–17, 10–14, 12–10
Pts: Reim Abdelalim 7 Rebs: Hoda Harb, Maya Abdelfattah 5 Asts: four players 1		Pts: Alexia Shanice dos Santos Dizeko 16; Rebs: Julia Francisco 9 Asts: Tatiana Miguel 5

Pavilhão do Maxaquene, Maputo
Referees: Dorothy Judy Okatch (BWA), Walelign Fikadu Gebeto (ETH), Zophila Emmanuel Mthembu (ZAF)

17 August
19:00

Boxscore

Uganda	31–86	Mozambique
Scoring by quarter: 14–24, 5–21, 4–19, 8–22
Pts: Alice Winnie Isoto 8 Rebs: Ramurah Nakato 10; Asts: Bridget Aber 3		Pts: Filipa Calisto 18; Rebs: Raida Luisa 12; Asts: Filipa Calisto 6

Pavilhão do Maxaquene, Maputo
Referees: Mohamed Lamline Diawara (MLI), Didier Gaga (RWA), Osvaldo Antonio Fernandes Quaresma Neto (AGO)

=== 5–8th place semifinals ===
18 August
12:15

Boxscore

Cape Verde	61–56 (2OT)	DR Congo
Scoring by quarter: 8–8, 13–12, 13–7, 13–20, Overtime: 6–6, 8–3
Pts: Joseana Vaz 34; Rebs: Joseana Vaz 23; Asts: Edmira Monteiro 4		Pts: Deborah Mayimona Kaba 17; Rebs: Grace Basiki 29; Asts: Ketia Mbelu 5

Pavilhão do Maxaquene, Maputo
Referees: Vinsencia Dyanda (ZWE), Osvaldo Antonio Fernandes Quaresma Neto (AGO), Mohamed Lamline Diawara (MLI)

18 August
14:30

Boxscore

Uganda	43–69	Egypt
Scoring by quarter: 4–18, 16–17, 6–23, 17–11
Pts: Fildauce Namulema 10; Rebs: Ramurah Nakato 12; Asts: three players 3		Pts: Maya Abdelfattah 11; Rebs: three players 6 Asts: Rania Mohamed, Maya Abdelfattah 3

Pavilhão do Maxaquene, Maputo
Referees: Artur Cesar Bandeira de Castro (MOZ), Didier Gaga (RWA), Mbayi Christian Ntela (COD)

=== Semifinals ===
18 August
16:45

Boxscore

Mali	124–27	Rwanda
Scoring by quarter: 25–9, 33–2, 41–6, 25–10
Pts: Assetou Sissoko 25; Rebs: Aminata Traore 16; Asts: Aminata Brahima Sangare 6		Pts: Ineza Sifa 9 Rebs: Bella Murekatete 8 Asts: Faustine Mwizerwa 3

Pavilhão do Maxaquene, Maputo
Referees: Monicca Nassuuna (UGA), Dorothy Judy Okatch (BWA), Zophila Emmanuel Mthembu (ZAF)

18 August
19:00

Boxscore

Mozambique	53–49	Angola
Scoring by quarter: 12–15, 11–6, 22–16, 8–12
Pts: Hulda Joaquim 11; Rebs: Hulda Joaquim 11; Asts: Ester Gomes 5		Pts: Alexia Shanice dos Santos Dizeko 21; Rebs: Marioneth Silva, Alexia Shanice dos Santos Dizeko 5 Asts: Tatiana Miguel 3

Pavilhão do Maxaquene, Maputo
Referees: Aya Khaled Abdelmohsed Ahmed (EGY), Walelign Fikadu Gebeto (ETH), Mohamed Lamline Diawara (MLI)

=== Seventh place match ===
19 August
12:15

Boxscore

Uganda	38–48	DR Congo
Scoring by quarter: 7–15, 13–9, 10–11, 8–13
Pts: Azidah Nabayunga 8 Rebs: Ramurah Nakato 10; Asts: Ramurah Nakato 4		Pts: Deborah Mayimona Kaba 15; Rebs: Tania Longomo Kokolo 15; Asts: Ketia Mbelu 5

Pavilhão do Maxaquene, Maputo

=== Fifth place match ===
19 August
14:30

Boxscore

Egypt	43–38	Cape Verde
Scoring by quarter: 9–7, 13–9, 12–8, 9–14
Pts: Maya Abdelfattah 13; Rebs: Reem Khalaf 9 Asts: Maya Abdelfattah, Nouran Ibrahim 3		Pts: Joseana Vaz 24; Rebs: Joseana Vaz 11; Asts: Zidania Ribeiro 2

Pavilhão do Maxaquene, Maputo
Referees: Mohamed Lamline Diawara (MLI), Osvaldo Antonio Fernandes Quaresma Neto (AGO), Mbayi Christian Ntela (COD)

=== Bronze medal match ===
19 August
16:45

Boxscore

Angola	59–46	Rwanda
Scoring by quarter: 18–12, 12–13, 15–10, 14–11
Pts: Alexia Shanice dos Santos Dizeko 18; Rebs: Alexia Shanice dos Santos Dizeko 7 Asts: Marioneth Silva, Alexia Shanice dos Santos Dizeko 4		Pts: Bella Murekatete 20; Rebs: Bella Murekatete 7 Asts: Faustine Mwizerwa, Deborah Iryimanivuze 3

Pavilhão do Maxaquene, Maputo
Referees: Artur Cesar Bandeira de Castro (MOZ), Walelign Fikadu Gebeto (ETH), Zophila Emmanuel Mthembu (ZAF)

=== Final ===
19 August
19:00

Boxscore

Mozambique	33–86	Mali
Scoring by quarter: 7–22, 11–28, 5–19, 10–17
Pts: Ester Gomes 11; Rebs: Hulda Joaquim 9 Asts: Suze Cipriano 2		Pts: Sika Koné, Assetou Sissoko 25; Rebs: Sika Koné 17; Asts: Sika Koné 7

Pavilhão do Maxaquene, Maputo
Referees: Aya Khaled Abdelmohsed Ahmed (EGY), Dorothy Judy Okatch (BWA), Monicca Nassuuna (UGA)

== Awards ==
2018 FIBA U18 Women's African Championship winner

Mali
Seventh title

Most Valuable Player
(Mali) Assetou Sissoko

=== All-Tournament Team ===
- (Mozambique) Filipa Calisto
- (Rwanda) Bella Murekatete
- (Angola) Alexia Dizeko
- (Mali) Assetou Sissoko
- (Mali) Aminata Sangare

== Final standings ==
Qualified for the 2019 FIBA U19 Women's Basketball World Cup

Rank	Team	Record
Gold medal	Mali	6-0
Silver medal	Mozambique	5-1
Bronze medal	Angola	4-2
4.	Rwanda	3-3
5.	Egypt	3-3
6.	Cape Verde	1-5
7.	DR Congo	2-4
8.	Uganda	0-6
