= Al-Risalah (Ibn Abi Zayd) =

Al-Risalah al-Fiqhiyyah
- Author: Al-Qayrawani (922 – 996 CE)
- Original title: الرسالة الفقهية
- Working title: متن الرسالة
- Language: Arabic
- Subject: Aqidah, Fiqh, Malikism
- Genre: Prose

Al-Risalah al-Fiqhiyyah (Arabic: الرسالة الفقهية) is an Aqidah and Maliki fiqh book written by Ibn Abi Zayd al-Qayrawani (922 – 996 CE) for learning Islam in North Africa.

== Presentation ==
The book “Ar-Risala” is a Mukhtasar in Maliki fiqh, written by Imam Abu Muhammad Abdullah Ibn Abi Zayd al-Qayrawani, who was nicknamed “Malik al-Saghir” and Sheikh of the Malikis in the Maghreb, on the suggestion of his student Sheikh Mahrez bin Khalaf al-Bakri al-Tunusi al-Maliki (951 - 1022 CE).

In this regard, Imam Ibn Abi Zaid said, addressing Sheikh Mahrez:

Arabic citation	English translation
Arabic: فإنك سألتني أن أكتب لك جملة مختصرة من واجب أمور الديانة مما تنطق الألسنة وتعتقده القلوب وتعمله الجوارح، وما يتصل بالواجب من ذلك من السنن من مؤكدها ونوافلها ورغائبها وشيء من الآداب منها، وجمل من أصول الفقه وفنونه على مذهب الإمام مالك بن أنس وطريقته، مع ما سهل سبيل ما أشكل من ذلك من تفسير الراسخين وبيان المتفقهين — Ibn Abi Zayd al-Qayrawani	English: “You asked me to write for you a brief sentence about the duty of matters of religion, which is what the tongues speak and the qulub believe and the prey people do, and the Sunnahs related to the duty of that, including their affirmations, their imperfections, their desires, and some etiquette of them. And one of the fundamentals of fiqh and its arts, according to the madhhab and tariqa of Imam Malik ibn Anas, with what facilitated the path of what was formed from that of the tafsir of the rassikhine and the statement of the fuqahā“. — Ibn Abi Zayd al-Qayrawani

The motive for Sheikh Mehrez’s suggestion was what Imam Ibn Abi Zayd mentioned in his speech to him also:

Arabic citation	English translation
Arabic: لما رغبت فيه من تعليم ذلك للولدان، كما تعلمهم حروف القرآن ليسبق إلى قلوبهم من فهم دين الله وشرائعه ما ترجى لهم بركته، وتحمد لهم عاقبته، فأجبتك إلى ذلك لما رجوته لنفسي وذلك من علم دين الله أو دعا إليه — Ibn Abi Zayd al-Qayrawani	English: “When I wanted it to teach that to the children, just as teach them the letters of the Qur’an to precede their qulub from understanding the religion and laws of Allah what His blessing is sought for them, and thank them for its consequences. I answered you to that when I begged him for myself, and that is from knowing the religion of God or calling for it“. — Ibn Abi Zayd al-Qayrawani

== Objectives ==
Al-Risalah, as is evident from the words of Ibn Abi Zaid, is a book for Islamic and jurisprudential education, that is, a textbook intended for talibes and murids with modern expression.

Al-Qayrawani himself confirms this in the epilogue of the Risala when he said:

Arabic citation	English translation
Arabic: “قد أتينا على ما شرطنا أن نأتي به في كتابنا هذا مما ينتفع به إن شاء الله من رغب في تعليم ذلك من الصغار، ومن احتاج إليه من الكبار. وفيه ما يؤدي الجاهل إلى علم ما يعتقده من دينه ويعمل به من فرائضه، ويفهم كثيرا من أصول الرغائب والآداب“. — Ibn Abi Zayd al-Qayrawani	English: “We have come to what we have stipulated that we bring in this book from what benefits, Allah willing, from the young who want to teach that, and from the adults who need it. And in it what leads the ignorant to know what he thinks from his religion, he follows it from his obligations, and understands a lot of the principles of desires and morals“. — Ibn Abi Zayd al-Qayrawani

== Contents ==
Imam al-Qayrawani divided his book "The Risalah" into two parts:

1. Issues of Aqidah: Al-Qayrawani devoted a whole chapter to them, which he called: "The chapter on what the tongues utter and believe is the duty of religious matters" (Arabic: باب ما تنطق به الألسنة وتعتقده الأفئدة من واجب أمور الديانات) where he gathered one hundred Aqidahs.
2. Issues of Fiqh, arranged by Ibn Abi Zaid on forty-four chapters other than the chapter related to Aqidahs, including chapters related to the pillars of religion such as prayer, zakat, Hajj and fasting, and related rulings, and chapters related to jihad, faith and vows, marriage and what follows it, sales and wills, and others.
