= Rwanda women's national under-18 basketball team =

Rwanda
- FIBA zone: FIBA Africa
- National federation: Fédération Rwandaise de Basketball Amateur

U19 World Cup
- Appearances: None

U18 AfroBasket
- Appearances: 2
- Medals: None
Home	Away

The Rwanda women's national under-18 basketball team is a national basketball team of Rwanda, administered by the Fédération Rwandaise de Basketball Amateur. It represents the country in international under-18 women's basketball competitions.

== FIBA U18 Women's AfroBasket participations ==
Year	Result
2018	4th
2024	7th

== See also ==
- Rwanda women's national basketball team
- Rwanda women's national under-16 basketball team
- Rwanda men's national under-18 basketball team
