= 2024 FIBA U18 Women's AfroBasket =

17th FIBA Under-18 Women's African Basketball Championship

Tournament details
- Host country: South Africa
- City: Pretoria
- Dates: 2−14 September
- Teams: 12 (from 1 confederation)
- Venues: 2 (in 1 host city)

Final positions
- Champions: Mali (9th title)
- Runners-up: Nigeria
- Third place: Cameroon
- Fourth place: Uganda

Tournament statistics
- Games played: 34
- Attendance: 2,202 (65 per game)
- MVP: (Mali) Oummou Koumaré
- Top scorer: (Mali) Oummou Koumaré (22.5 points per game)

Official website
- www.fiba.basketball

The 2024 FIBA U18 Women's AfroBasket was the 17th edition of the African basketball championship for women's under-18 national teams. The tournament was played in Pretoria, South Africa, from 2 to 14 September 2024. This was the first time that South Africa organized this event.

This tournament also served as the FIBA Africa's qualifier for the 2025 FIBA Under-19 Women's Basketball World Cup in the Czech Republic, where the top two teams qualified.

Mali successfully defended their title and secured the ninth overall one with a victory over Nigeria in the final, 76–56.

== Qualification ==
Means of qualification	Dates	Venue	Berths	Qualifiers
Host nation	N/A	N/A	1	South Africa
2022 FIBA U18 Women's African Championship Top Three	5–13 August 2022	(Madagascar) Antsirabe	3	Mali; Egypt; Angola
2024 Zone I U18 Qualifiers	11–14 July 2024	(Tunisia) Tunis	1	Morocco
2024 Zone II U18 Qualifiers	N/A	N/A	N/A	N/A
2024 Zone III U18 Qualifiers	N/A	(Ivory Coast) Abidjan	1	Nigeria
2024 Zone IV U18 Qualifiers	N/A	N/A	1	Cameroon
2024 Zone V U18 Qualifiers	9–14 June 2024	(Uganda) Kampala	1	Uganda
2024 Zone VI U18 Qualifiers	25–29 June 2024	(Zambia) Lusaka	1	Zambia
2024 Zone VII U18 Qualifiers	N/A	N/A	N/A	N/A
Wildcards	N/A	N/A	3	Rwanda; Tunisia; Zimbabwe
Total			12	

=== Qualified teams ===
Includes current world ranking prior to the start of the tournament (in parentheses).

- Host nation (1)
  - South Africa (NR)
- Zone I
  - Tunisia (35)
  - Morocco (47)
- Zone II
  - Mali (12)
- Zone III
  - Nigeria (NR)
- Zone IV
  - Cameroon (NR)
- Zone V
  - Egypt (20)
  - Uganda (36)
  - Rwanda (67)
- Zone VI
  - Angola (33)
  - Zambia (NR)
  - Zimbabwe (NR)

== Group phase ==
The draw of the group phase took place on 24 August 2024 in Kigali, Rwanda.

In this round, the teams were drawn into three groups of four. The top two teams from each group and the best two third-placed teams advanced to the quarterfinals; the other teams were dropped to the 9th–12th place playoffs.

All times are local (South African Standard Time; UTC+2).

=== Group A ===
Pos	Team	Pld	W	L	PF	PA	PD	Pts	Qualification
1	Tunisia	3	3	0	238	154	+84	6	Quarterfinals
2	Cameroon	3	2	1	245	142	+103	5	Quarterfinals
3	Rwanda	3	1	2	219	190	+29	4	Quarterfinals
4	South Africa (H)	3	0	3	84	300	−216	3	9th–12th place playoffs

Source: FIBA Africa
Rules for classification: 1) Points; 2) Head-to-head results; 3) Points difference; 4) Points scored.
(H) Hosts

2 September 2024
13:00

Boxscore

Tunisia	73–59	Cameroon
Scoring by quarter: 22–14, 18–18, 19–10, 14–17
Pts: Ben Belaid 23; Rebs: Arbi 8 Asts: Ben Rejeb, Chehidi 3		Pts: Emedie 18; Rebs: Madjou, Emedie 11; Asts: Williams, Nyeck 2

University of Pretoria
Attendance: 80
Referees: Erick Omondi Otieno (KEN), Mohamed Lamline Diawara (MLI), Hazel Agina Oduor (KEN)

2 September 2024
15:30

Boxscore

South Africa	37–102	Rwanda
Scoring by quarter: 5–25, 12–22, 12–29, 8–26
Pts: Faurholm 9 Rebs: Obiedelu 14; Asts: Faurholm 2		Pts: Nibishaka 25; Rebs: Nibishaka 16; Asts: Mugisha, Uwitonze 3

University of Pretoria
Referees: Fanta Toure (MLI), Jerome Olivier Denis (MRI), Emmanuel O.Paterne Kpawogbo (BEN)

5 September 2024
15:00

Boxscore

Cameroon	107–23	South Africa
Scoring by quarter: 26–8, 33–3, 21–10, 27–2
Pts: Kipo 33; Rebs: Emedie 21; Asts: Abada, Kipo 4		Pts: Thonga, Obiedelu 7 Rebs: Thonga 14; Asts: Aboo, Faurholm 2

University of Pretoria
Attendance: 100
Referees: Aya Khaled Ahmed (EGY), Maria Bagnath (MOZ), Lizzy Nambuya (UGA)

5 September 2024
20:00

Boxscore

Rwanda	71–74	Tunisia
Scoring by quarter: 15–21, 11–19, 29–13, 16–21
Pts: Nibishaka 24; Rebs: Nibishaka 15; Asts: Muhawenimana 4		Pts: Mares 20; Rebs: Mares, Horchani 9 Asts: Chehidi 5

University of Pretoria
Attendance: 100
Referees: Fanta Toure (MLI), Joyce Akosu (NGA), Francisco Tando (ANG)

8 September 2024
12:30

Boxscore

South Africa	24–91	Tunisia
Scoring by quarter: 14–17, 3–37, 4–23, 3–14
Pts: Thwala 7 Rebs: Obiedelu 17; Asts: Three players 1		Pts: Ben Belaid 26; Rebs: Arbi 8 Asts: Ben Rejeb, Horchani 7

University of Pretoria
Attendance: 50
Referees: Carlota Churane (MOZ), Joyce Akosu (NGA), Lizzy Nambuya (UGA)

8 September 2024
17:30

Boxscore

Cameroon	79–46	Rwanda
Scoring by quarter: 17–14, 25–11, 18–13, 19–8
Pts: Emedie 21; Rebs: Emedie 17; Asts: Emedie 4		Pts: Nibishaka 17; Rebs: Nibishaka 8 Asts: Muhawenimana, Nibishaka 3

University of Pretoria
Attendance: 50
Referees: Asmae Benkhadra (MAR), Imene Tahmi (ALG), Aya Khaled Ahmed (EGY)

=== Group B ===
Pos	Team	Pld	W	L	PF	PA	PD	Pts	Qualification
1	Mali	3	3	0	284	117	+167	6	Quarterfinals
2	Angola	3	2	1	199	148	+51	5	Quarterfinals
3	Morocco	3	1	2	198	227	−29	4	9th–12th place playoffs
4	Zambia	3	0	3	104	293	−189	3	9th–12th place playoffs

Source: FIBA Africa
Rules for classification: 1) Points; 2) Head-to-head results; 3) Points difference; 4) Points scored.

3 September 2024
15:00

Boxscore

Morocco	75–56	Zambia
Scoring by quarter: 19–15, 12–14, 15–6, 29–21
Pts: Louveton 21; Rebs: Louveton 11; Asts: El Hakmi 8		Pts: Simubali 22; Rebs: Simubali 16; Asts: Phiri 7

University of Pretoria
Attendance: 100

3 September 2024
20:00

Boxscore

Mali	51–43	Angola
Scoring by quarter: 12–12, 10–9, 16–14, 13–8
Pts: Koumare 14; Rebs: Dabo 11; Asts: M. Traore, Sidibe 4		Pts: Amaral 16; Rebs: Moniz 8 Asts: Amaral 3

University of Pretoria
Attendance: 50
Referees: Arbia Belghith (TUN), Didier Shema Nshuti (RWA), Cebolenkosi Gooenough Dakkie (RSA)

6 September 2024
12:30

Boxscore

Zambia	13–136	Mali
Scoring by quarter: 4–38, 2–31, 6–29, 1–38
Pts: Shanzi 6 Rebs: Simubali 11; Asts: Simubali 2		Pts: Koumare 24; Rebs: F. Samake 15; Asts: M. Traore, Koumare 6

University of Pretoria
Attendance: 50
Referees: Aya Khaled Ahmed (EGY), Nonkanyiso Thandekile Buhlebuyeza Khuzwayo (RSA), N'Guessan Lydie Konan (CIV)

6 September 2024
20:00

Boxscore

Angola	74–62	Morocco
Scoring by quarter: 26–23, 20–11, 20–11, 8–17
Pts: Gongo 25; Rebs: Buitchi 9 Asts: Amaral 8		Pts: Louveton 20; Rebs: Louveton 13; Asts: El Hakmi 6

University of Pretoria
Attendance: 80
Referees: Jerome Olivier Denis (MRI), Keith Chiposi (ZIM), Joyce Akosu (NGA)

9 September 2024
12:30

Boxscore

Zambia	35–82	Angola
Scoring by quarter: 8–18, 11–23, 5–29, 11–12
Pts: Mwale 12; Rebs: Simubali 9 Asts: Phiri 4		Pts: Amaral 28; Rebs: Moniz 13; Asts: Cavula, Moniz 4

University of Pretoria
Attendance: 50

9 September 2024
17:30

Boxscore

Mali	97–61	Morocco
Scoring by quarter: 23–21, 19–21, 33–6, 22–13
Pts: Koumare 26; Rebs: Dabo 18; Asts: M. Traore 8		Pts: Louveton 18; Rebs: El Hakmi, Louveton 6 Asts: Bouboul, El Hakmi 6

University of Pretoria
Attendance: 50

=== Group C ===
Pos	Team	Pld	W	L	PF	PA	PD	Pts	Qualification
1	Egypt	3	3	0	270	140	+130	6	Quarterfinals
2	Uganda	3	2	1	218	176	+42	5	Quarterfinals
3	Nigeria	3	1	2	231	182	+49	4	Quarterfinals
4	Zimbabwe	3	0	3	93	314	−221	3	9th–12th place playoffs

Source: FIBA Africa
Rules for classification: 1) Points; 2) Head-to-head results; 3) Points difference; 4) Points scored.

2 September 2024
18:00

Boxscore

Egypt	72–60	Nigeria
Scoring by quarter: 21–20, 22–12, 15–16, 14–12
Pts: Abouelghait 19; Rebs: Elhemaly 8 Asts: Elgendy 4		Pts: Beggi 23; Rebs: Isaac 14; Asts: Beggi 3

University of Pretoria
Attendance: 100
Referees: Cebolenkosi Gooenough Dakkie (RSA), Maria Bagnath (MOZ), Asmae Benkhadra (MAR)

2 September 2024
20:30

Boxscore

Zimbabwe	36–85	Uganda
Scoring by quarter: 5–16, 8–23, 8–25, 15–21
Pts: Tshuma, Chikwata 11; Rebs: Tshuma 10; Asts: Chikwata 2		Pts: Nanangwe 24; Rebs: Kiranda 10; Asts: Adongpiny 4

University of Pretoria
Attendance: 50
Referees: Imene Tahmi (ALG), Henri Léopold Biagui (SEN), Arbia Belghith (TUN)

5 September 2024
12:30

Boxscore

Nigeria	107–30	Zimbabwe
Scoring by quarter: 29–5, 27–7, 26–12, 25–6
Pts: Beggi 20; Rebs: Ayodeji 12; Asts: Beggi 7		Pts: Chikwata 13; Rebs: Tshuma 6 Asts: Three players 2

University of Pretoria
Attendance: 50
Referees: Hazel Agina Oduor (KEN), Christelle Madjio Libawo (CMR), Lea Ndererimana (RWA)

5 September 2024
17:30

Boxscore

Uganda	53–76	Egypt
Scoring by quarter: 15–23, 7–23, 16–18, 15–12
Pts: Anyango 15; Rebs: Kiranda 10; Asts: Adongpiny, Anyango 2		Pts: Elsanadily 15; Rebs: Abouelghait 12; Asts: Elsanadily 5

University of Pretoria
Attendance: 100
Referees: Asmae Benkhadra (MAR), Carlota Churane (MOZ), Nonkanyiso Thandekile Buhlebuyeza Khuzwayo (RSA)

8 September 2024
15:00

Boxscore

Uganda	80–64	Nigeria
Scoring by quarter: 19–23, 22–16, 17–10, 22–15
Pts: Nanangwe 31; Rebs: Nanangwe 10; Asts: Namayanja, Nanangwe 4		Pts: Beggi 16; Rebs: Isaac 22; Asts: Beggi 5

University of Pretoria
Attendance: 50
Referees: Arbia Belghith (TUN), Fanta Toure (MLI), Maria Bagnath (MOZ)

8 September 2024
20:00

Boxscore

Egypt	122–27	Zimbabwe
Scoring by quarter: 32–4, 21–6, 32–9, 37–8
Pts: Alaaeldin 21; Rebs: Abdelaal 12; Asts: Abouelghait 8		Pts: Sibanda 13; Rebs: Murima 17; Asts: Ngwenya 3

University of Pretoria
Attendance: 50
Referees: Christelle Madjio Libawo (CMR), Nonkanyiso Thandekile Buhlebuyeza Khuzwayo (RSA), N'Guessan Lydie Konan (CIV)

=== Ranking of third-placed teams ===
Pos	Grp	Team	Pld	W	L	PF	PA	PD	Pts	Qualification
1	C	Nigeria	3	1	2	231	182	+49	4	Quarterfinals
2	A	Rwanda	3	1	2	219	190	+29	4	Quarterfinals
3	B	Morocco	3	1	2	198	227	−29	4	9th–12th place playoffs

Source: FIBA Africa

== Group phase overall ranking ==
Rank	Team
1	Mali
2	Egypt
3	Tunisia
4	Cameroon
5	Angola
6	Uganda
7	Nigeria
8	Rwanda
9	Morocco
10	Zambia
11	South Africa
12	Zimbabwe

Advanced to quarterfinals
Dropped to 9th–12th place playoffs

== 9th–12th place playoffs ==
9th–12th place semifinals
11 September
9	Morocco	93
12	Zimbabwe	38
11 September
10	Zambia	43
11	South Africa	46

9th place game
12 September
Morocco	84
South Africa	47
11th place game
12 September
Zimbabwe	45
Zambia	50

=== 9th–12th place semifinals ===
11 September 2024
12:00

Boxscore

Zambia	43–46	South Africa
Scoring by quarter: 19–7, 9–12, 8–14, 7–13
Pts: Mwale 15; Rebs: Shanzi 16; Asts: Phiri 7		Pts: Obiedelu 13; Rebs: Obiedelu 27; Asts: Howard, Faurholm 2

Pilditch Indoor, Pretoria
Attendance: 64
Referees: N'Guessan Lydie Konan (CIV), Keith Chiposi (ZIM), Maria Bagnath (MOZ)

11 September 2024
14:30

Boxscore

Morocco	93–38	Zimbabwe
Scoring by quarter: 27–9, 24–4, 13–12, 29–13
Pts: El Hakmi 23; Rebs: Louveton, Bouyahyaoui 9 Asts: El Hakmi, Louveton 5		Pts: Tshuma 10; Rebs: Mpofu 10; Asts: Three players 2

Pilditch Indoor, Pretoria
Attendance: 25
Referees: Lea Ndererimana (RWA), Lizzy Nambuya (UGA), Christelle Madjio Libawo (CMR)

=== 11th place game ===
12 September 2024
12:00

Boxscore

Zimbabwe	45–50	Zambia
Scoring by quarter: 8–10, 14–16, 11–12, 12–12
Pts: Tshuma 11; Rebs: Gwashero 10; Asts: Ngwenya 4		Pts: Simubali 15; Rebs: Simubali 20; Asts: Mbulo, Simubali 3

Pilditch Indoor
Attendance: 10
Referees: Joyce Akosu (NGA), Nonkanyiso Thandekile Buhlebuyeza Khuzwayo (RSA), Lizzy Nambuya (UGA)

=== 9th place game ===
12 September 2024
14:30

Boxscore

Morocco	84–47	South Africa
Scoring by quarter: 31–4, 21–10, 12–17, 20–16
Pts: El Hakmi, Louveton 19; Rebs: Louveton 18; Asts: Louveton 6		Pts: Obiedelu 16; Rebs: Obiedelu 24; Asts: Three players 2

Pilditch Indoor
Attendance: 40
Referees: Carlota Churane (MOZ), N'Guessan Lydie Konan (CIV), Christelle Madjio Libawo (CMR)

== Championship playoffs ==
5th place game
14 September
Angola	50
Egypt	53
7th place game
14 September
Rwanda	65
Tunisia	52

5th–8th place semifinals
13 September
Rwanda	43
Angola	48
13 September
Egypt	68
Tunisia	28

Quarterfinals
11 September
1	Mali	86
8	Rwanda	57
11 September
4	Cameroon	65
5	Angola	63
11 September
2	Egypt	51
7	Nigeria	66
11 September
3	Tunisia	53
6	Uganda	69

Semifinals
13 September
Mali	103
Cameroon	45
13 September
Nigeria	71
Uganda	67

Final
14 September
Mali	76
Nigeria	56
3rd place game
14 September
Cameroon	70
Uganda	66

=== Quarterfinals ===
11 September 2024
12:30

Boxscore

Mali	86–57	Rwanda
Scoring by quarter: 19–11, 25–15, 21–20, 21–11
Pts: M. Doumbia 21; Rebs: M. Doumbia 22; Asts: Koumare 6		Pts: Nibishaka 19; Rebs: Cyuzuzo 13; Asts: Camara 3

University of Pretoria
Attendance: 80
Referees: Imene Tahmi (ALG), Carlota Churane (MOZ), Afolabi Ikuomola (NGA)

11 September 2024
15:00

Boxscore

Tunisia	53–69	Uganda
Scoring by quarter: 15–20, 13–12, 18–15, 7–22
Pts: Horchani 13; Rebs: Arbi, Chehidi 10; Asts: Chehidi 5		Pts: Nanangwe 27; Rebs: Kiranda 9 Asts: Adongpiny 5

University of Pretoria
Attendance: 50
Referees: Fanta Toure (MLI), Joyce Akosu (NGA), Nonkanyiso Thandekile Buhlebuyeza Khuzwayo (RSA)

11 September 2024
17:30

Boxscore

Cameroon	65–63	Angola
Scoring by quarter: 22–14, 9–19, 19–15, 15–15
Pts: Emedie 15; Rebs: Emedie 19; Asts: Abada, Emedie 3		Pts: Servico 15; Rebs: Servico 10; Asts: Cavula 3

University of Pretoria
Attendance: 56
Referees: Aya Khaled Ahmed (EGY), Arbia Belghith (TUN), Henri Léopold Biagui (SEN)

11 September 2024
20:00

Boxscore

Egypt	51–66	Nigeria
Scoring by quarter: 13–24, 10–13, 13–17, 15–12
Pts: Abouelghait 13; Rebs: Abouelghait 7 Asts: Elgendy, Hathout 2		Pts: Isaac 15; Rebs: Isaac 12; Asts: Beggi, Hembam 7

University of Pretoria
Attendance: 75
Referees: Asmae Benkhadra (MAR), Francisco Tando (ANG), Hazel Agina Oduor (KEN)

=== 5th–8th place semifinals ===
13 September 2024
12:00

Boxscore

Rwanda	43–48	Angola
Scoring by quarter: 15–6, 11–13, 12–16, 5–13
Pts: Nibishaka 13; Rebs: Cyuzuzo 10; Asts: Ingabire, Nibishaka 2		Pts: Three players 9 Rebs: Moniz 12; Asts: Servico 8

Pilditch Indoor
Attendance: 52
Referees: Christelle Madjio Libawo (CMR), Joyce Akosu (NGA), Carlota Churane (MOZ)

13 September 2024
14:30

Boxscore

Egypt	68–28	Tunisia
Scoring by quarter: 18–10, 9–4, 16–6, 25–8
Pts: Hathout 10; Rebs: Elhemaly 11; Asts: Elgendy 4		Pts: Chehidi 9 Rebs: Arbi 10; Asts: Arbi 4

Pilditch Indoor
Attendance: 25
Referees: Fanta Toure (MLI), N'Guessan Lydie Konan (CIV), Lea Ndererimana (RWA)

==== 7th place game ====
14 September 2024
09:00

Boxscore

Rwanda	65–52	Tunisia
Scoring by quarter: 19–9, 19–20, 15–15, 12–8
Pts: Camara 19; Rebs: Four players 7 Asts: Camara, Ingabire 3		Pts: Horchani 17; Rebs: Three players 6 Asts: Horchani 3

Pilditch Indoor
Attendance: 25

==== 5th place game ====
14 September 2024
11:30

Boxscore

Angola	50–53	Egypt
Scoring by quarter: 13–19, 14–10, 11–17, 12–7
Pts: Nganga 13; Rebs: Moniz 14; Asts: Servico 8		Pts: Alaaeldin 17; Rebs: Abouelghait 12; Asts: Elgoly, Elsanadily 4

Pilditch Indoor
Attendance: 20

=== Semifinals ===
13 September 2024
12:30

Boxscore

Mali	103–45	Cameroon
Scoring by quarter: 26–8, 14–12, 35–14, 28–11
Pts: Koumare, M. Doumbia 24; Rebs: F. Samake 10; Asts: Sidibe 6		Pts: Emedie 18; Rebs: Emedie 11; Asts: Dibadjou 3

University of Pretoria
Attendance: 50
Referees: Arbia Belghith (TUN), Imene Tahmi (ALG), Hazel Agina Oduor (KEN)

13 September 2024
15:00

Boxscore

Nigeria	71–67	Uganda
Scoring by quarter: 21–20, 24–19, 16–15, 10–13
Pts: Beggi 23; Rebs: Isaac 14; Asts: Beggi 6		Pts: Nanangwe 16; Rebs: Nanangwe 12; Asts: Adongpiny 5

University of Pretoria
Attendance: 70
Referees: Aya Khaled Ahmed (EGY), Asmae Benkhadra (MAR), Maria Bagnath (MOZ)

==== 3rd place game ====
14 September 2024
12:00

Boxscore

Cameroon	70–66	Uganda
Scoring by quarter: 15–13, 21–20, 19–14, 15–19
Pts: Kipo, Emedie 19; Rebs: Emedie 24; Asts: Emedie 7		Pts: Nanangwe 19; Rebs: Kiranda 9 Asts: Kiranda 5

University of Pretoria
Attendance: 100

==== Final ====
14 September 2024
17:00

Boxscore

Mali	76–56	Nigeria
Scoring by quarter: 11–8, 18–15, 24–19, 23–14
Pts: Koumare 31; Rebs: Dabo, M. Doumbia 9 Asts: M. Traore 9		Pts: Beggi 14; Rebs: Tewogbade, Isaac 11; Asts: Beggi, Tewogbade 4

University of Pretoria
Attendance: 300

== Final standings ==
Rank	Team	Record
1st place, gold medalist(s)	Mali	6–0
2nd place, silver medalist(s)	Nigeria	3–3
3rd place, bronze medalist(s)	Cameroon	4–2
4	Uganda	3–3
5	Egypt	5–1
6	Angola	3–3
7	Rwanda	2–4
8	Tunisia	3–3
9	Morocco	3–2
10	South Africa	1–4
11	Zambia	1–4
12	Zimbabwe	0–5

Qualified for the 2025 FIBA Under-19 Women's Basketball World Cup

== Statistics and awards ==
=== Statistical leaders ===
==== Players ====
Points

Name	PPG
(Mali) Oummou Koumare	22.5
(Uganda) Resty Nanangwe	20.3
(Morocco) Eiza Louveton	18.8
(Rwanda) Brigitte Nibishaka	18.5
(Cameroon) Damaris Emedie	18.3

Rebounds

Name	RPG
(South Africa) Amarachi Cynthia Obiedelu	18.8
(Cameroon) Damaris Emedie	17.2
(Zambia) Cholwe Simubali	14.2
(Nigeria) Abigail Isaac	14.0
(Morocco) Eiza Louveton	11.4

Assists

Name	APG
(Mali) Maimouna Traore	5.7
(Morocco) Chaima El Hakmi	5.6
(Nigeria) Idubamo Beggi	5.3
(Zambia) Sepho Phiri	4.0
(Tunisia) Malak Chehidi	3.6

Blocks

Name	BPG
(Zambia) Cholwe Simubali	3.0
(South Africa) Amarachi Cynthia Obiedelu	2.8
(Tunisia) Rim Arbi	2.2
(Tunisia) Molka Mares	2.0
(Cameroon) Damaris Emedie	1.5
(Mali) Fatoumata Samake	1.5

Steals

Name	SPG
(Morocco) Eiza Louveton	5.8
(Uganda) Modesta Anyango	5.2
(Morocco) Chaima El Hakmi	4.8
(Mali) Maimouna Traore	4.8
(Nigeria) Idubamo Beggi	4.5

Efficiency

Name	EFFPG
(Morocco) Eiza Louveton	27.0
(Cameroon) Damaris Emedie	25.0
(Mali) Oummou Koumare	22.5
(South Africa) Amarachi Cynthia Obiedelu	21.2
(Mali) Mama Sidiki Doumbia	21.2

==== Teams ====
Points

Team	PPG
Mali	91.5
Morocco	75.0
Egypt	73.7
Cameroon	70.8
Nigeria	70.7

Rebounds

Team	RPG
Cameroon	60.6
Mali	59.4
Nigeria	58.8
South Africa	58.0
Egypt	55.6

Assists

Team	APG
Mali	26.2
Egypt	21.8
Morocco	20.0
Nigeria	16.4
Tunisia	15.0

Blocks

Team	BPG
South Africa	6.6
Tunisia	6.0
Mali	5.0
Egypt	4.4
Zambia	4.2

Steals

Team	SPG
Mali	27.4
Uganda	26.6
Nigeria	23.8
Rwanda	22.0
Morocco	22.0

Efficiency

Team	EFFPG
Mali	120.2
Egypt	86.5
Morocco	81.4
Nigeria	73.5
Cameroon	64.5

=== Awards ===
The awards were announced on 14 September 2024.

Award	Player
All-Tournament Team	(Mali) Oummou Koumare
All-Tournament Team	(Mali) Mama Sidiki Doumbia
All-Tournament Team	(Nigeria) Idubamo Beggi
All-Tournament Team	(Cameroon) Damaris Emedie
All-Tournament Team	(Uganda) Resty Nanangwe
Most Valuable Player	(Mali) Oummou Koumare
