= Ben Arous =

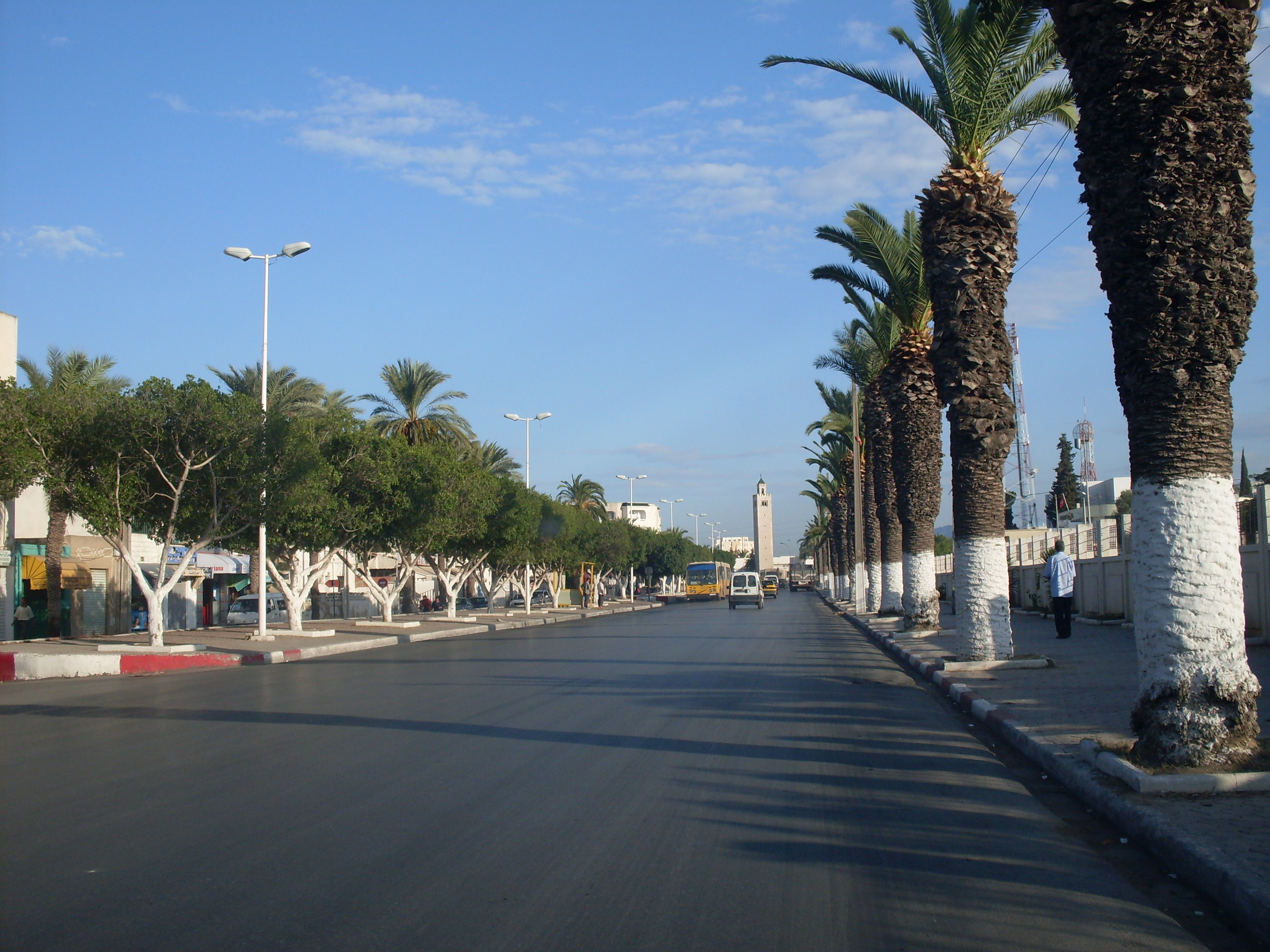

- Location in Tunisia
- Coordinates: 36°44′50″N 10°20′0″E
- Country: Tunisia
- Governorate: Ben Arous Governorate
- Delegation(s): Ben Arous

Government
  - Mayor: Mohamed Mezoughi (Ennahda)

Population (2014)
  - Total: 96,606
- Time zone: UTC1 (CET)

Ben Arous (Tunisian Arabic: بن عروس Ben ʿArūs) is a city in north-eastern Tunisia, part the agglomeration of Tunis, also called Grand Tunis. It is located south of Tunis city center and is the capital of the Ben Arous Governorate.

== Information about Ben Arous ==
East Ben Arous is on the Sidi Fathallah Plain, and is named after Muslim saint Sidi Ben Arous who died in 1444. It is known in legend as a site for curing female infertility. A farm was laid out on the plain where Sousse Road is planned to be built. The Sidi Fathallah Plain is the site where the battle of Ad Decimum was fought. This battle was the beginning of the end of the domination by the Byzantine Army General Belisarius, on September 13, 523 AD.

As Tunisia was a French protectorate from (1881–1956), during this time North Ben Arous was renamed Fochville and was the home of many employees of the Tunisian Railway Firm Company, whose stores were on what is now the Sidi Fathallah Plain. However, south Ben Arous was mainly inhabited by businessmen from Tunis who were French merchants and immigrants. Northeast Ben Arous was well known for its agriculture, and was famous for wines, grapes, vegetables, fruit and other produce.

Today Ben Arous is primarily an industrial zone with food and railway factories.

== See also ==
- Sidi Ben Arous
- List of cities in Tunisia
