= Abu ʾl-Faḍl Jaʿfar ibn Muḥammad =

Arab poet and aphorist from Kairouan

Abu ʾl-Faḍl Jaʿfar ibn Muḥammad (AD 1052/3–1139 [AH 444–534]) was an Andalusi Arab poet and aphorist from Kairouan. He moved to al-Andalus with his father, Ibn Sharaf, in 1057. He served as a vizier to Muḥammad al-Muʿtaṣim (r. 1051–1091) of Almería. His works are mainly lost, but he is known to have composed in the panegyric and gnomic genres of poetry. He penned two collections of aphorisms and maxims in both prose and verse, Nujḥ al-nuṣḥ and Sirr al-birr. He wrote an urjūza on asceticism. A few of his poems are quoted in anthologies and Ibn Bassām preserves a few verses and vizierial letters. He had a son, Abū ʿAbdallāh Muḥammad, who was also a gnomic poet, according to al-Maqqarī.
