= South Africa women's national under-18 basketball team =

South Africa
- FIBA zone: FIBA Africa
- National federation: Basketball South Africa

U19 World Cup
- Appearances: None

U18 AfroBasket
- Appearances: 2
- Medals: None

The South Africa women's national under-18 basketball team is a national basketball team of South Africa, administered by the Basketball South Africa. It represents the country in international under-18 women's basketball competitions.

== FIBA U18 Women's AfroBasket participations ==
Year	Result
2004	5th
2024	10th

== See also ==
- South Africa women's national basketball team
- South Africa women's national under-16 basketball team
- South Africa men's national under-18 basketball team
