= Ibn Abi Zayd al-Qayrawani =

10th-century Muslim scholar

Ibn Abī Zayd

Personal life
- Born: 922 Kairouan, Fatimid Caliphate
- Died: 386/996
- Main interest(s): Aqidah, Fiqh
- Notable work: Al-Risalah al-Fiqhiyyah

Religious life
- Religion: Islam
- Denomination: Sunni
- Jurisprudence: Mālikī
- Creed: Ash'ari

Muslim leader
- Influenced by: Malik ibn Anas
- Influenced: al-Baqillani Abu 'l-Hasan 'Ali ibn Khalaf al-Qabisi Ibn Wahb

Ibn Abī Zayd (Arabic: ابن أبي زيد القيرواني; 922–996), fully Abū Muḥammad ʿAbd Allāh ibn Abī Zayd ʿAbd al-Raḥmān al-Nafzawī ibn Abī Zayd al-Qayrawanī, was a Maliki scholar from Kairouan in Tunisia and was also an active proponent of Ash'ari thought. His best known work is Al-Risala or the Epistle, an instructional book devoted to the education of young children. He was a member of the Nafzawah Berber tribe and lived in Kairouan. In addition, he served as the Imam (spiritual leader) of one of the mosques' that followed the Maliki School tradition.

== Creed ==
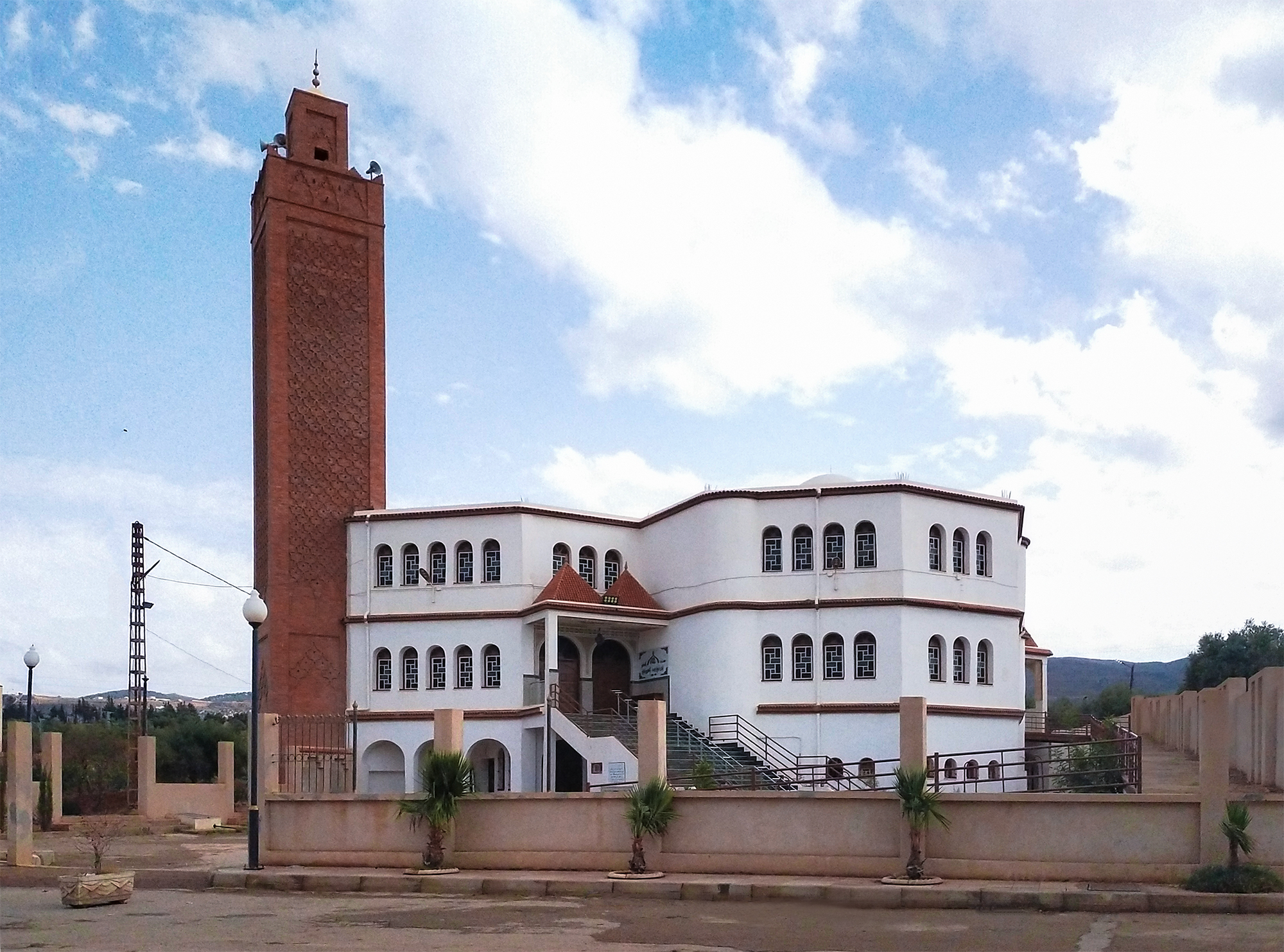
A mosque named after Ibn Abi Zayd al-Qayrawani in Tlemcen Province, Algeria

Belonging to the Ash`ari school, Ibn Abi Zayd al-Qayrawani (310–386) studied under Abu Bakr ibn Abd al-Mu'min, who in turn was a student of Ibn Mujahid, a pupil of Abu al-Hasan al-Ash`ari. Qadi Iyad stated that in 368, Ibn Abi Zayd dispatched two of his pupils to personally deliver a few of his books to Ibn Mujahid, who had made a request for them, along with a complete authorization to narrate them (ijaza).

Ibn Abi Zayd famously defended the Ash`ari school in his epistle entitled “Al-Radd `ala al-Qadariyya wa Munaqada Risala al-Baghdadi al-Mu`tazili,” a rejection of the assaults of the Mu`tazili `Ali ibn Isma`il al-Baghdadi. Al-Mayurqi further related that Ibn Abi Zayd said: “Al-Ash`ari is a man famous for refuting the people of Innovation, the Qadariyya and the Jahmiyya, and he held fast to the Sunan.”

== See also ==
- List of Ash'aris
- Al-Risalah al-Fiqhiyyah
