= Sidi Ben Arous =

Sidi Ahmed ben Arous سيدي أحمد بن عروس
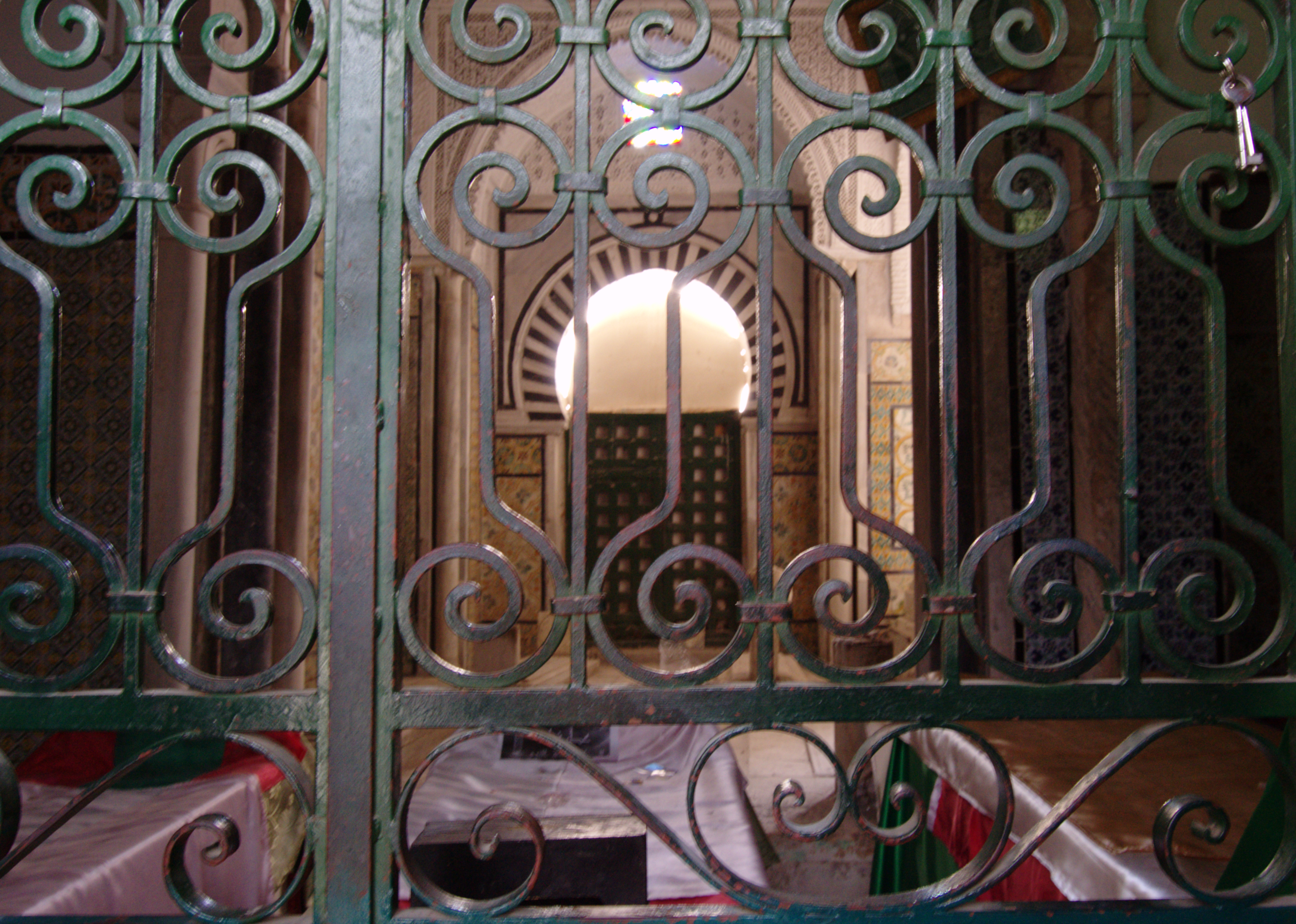
- Mausoleum of Sidi Ahmed ben Arous in Tunis, as pictured in September 2013

Personal life
- Born: 1376 Tunis
- Died: 21 October 1436 (aged 59–60) Tunis
- Other names: Abu Saraer ابو الصرائر

Religious life
- Religion: Islam
- Denomination: Sunni
- Jurisprudence: Maliki
- Tariqa: Tariqa Arousia

Muslim leader
- Influenced by: Sidi Mahrez Ash-Shadhili
- Influenced: Omar ar-Rashidi al-Jazairi Abdelwahed Doukkali Abdessalam al-Asmar

Ahmed ben Arous, full name: Abu al-Abbas Ahmed Ben Abdallah ben Abu Bakr al-Houari, Tunisian Arabic: أحمد بن عروس; (c. 1376–21 October 1436) was a Tunisian Wali, religious leader and founder of the Arousia Tariqa.

== Life ==
He was born in Tunis, to a father from the Houara tribe and a mother originally from Misrata, and was a follower of the Zawiya of Sidi Mahrez. He later went to Morocco where he studied in Fes and Marrakesh. Upon his return to Tunis, he lived in seclusion for a while then worked as carpenter. His Tariqa was influenced by the Shadhili order. He was known for his sympathy for the poor, the strangers and the animals. His teachings were revived by his disciple Abdessalam al-Asmar and an extended biography of him was written by Omar al-Jazairi.
