= Sidi Mahrez Mosque =

Mosque in Tunis, Tunisia

- جامع سيدي محرز
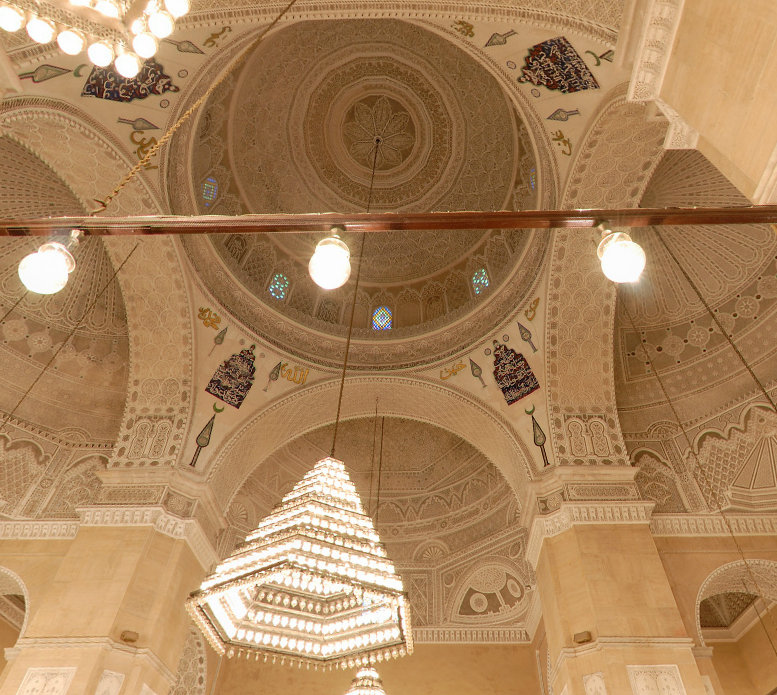

Religion
- Affiliation: Sunni Islam

Location
- Location: Medina of Tunis, Tunis
- Country: Tunisia
- Interactive map of Sidi Mahrez Mosque
- Coordinates: 36°48′15″N 10°10′06″E

Architecture
- Type: Mosque
- Style: Ottoman
- Groundbreaking: 1692
- Completed: 1697

Specifications
- Length: 70 m (229 ft)
- Height (max): 31 m (101 ft)

Sidi Mahrez Mosque, also known as Mohamed Bey El Mouradi Mosque, is a mosque in Tunis, Tunisia. It is an official historical monument.

== Localization ==
This mosque is located in the Medina area of the city.

== History ==
It was built by Mohamed Bey El Mouradi, son of Mourad Bey II in 1692 in honor of the patron-saint of Tunis Sidi Mahrez.

== Structure ==
It is strongly influenced by Ottoman architecture, showing similarities to the Sultan Ahmed II Mosque of Istanbul with a central dome with cupolas occupying the four corners of the square of the prayer hall. Polychrome tiles were imported from Iznik (Turkey) to cover a large part of the wall in the direction of Mecca and the grand pillars that support the central dome.

The interior of the mosque was renovated in the 1960s.

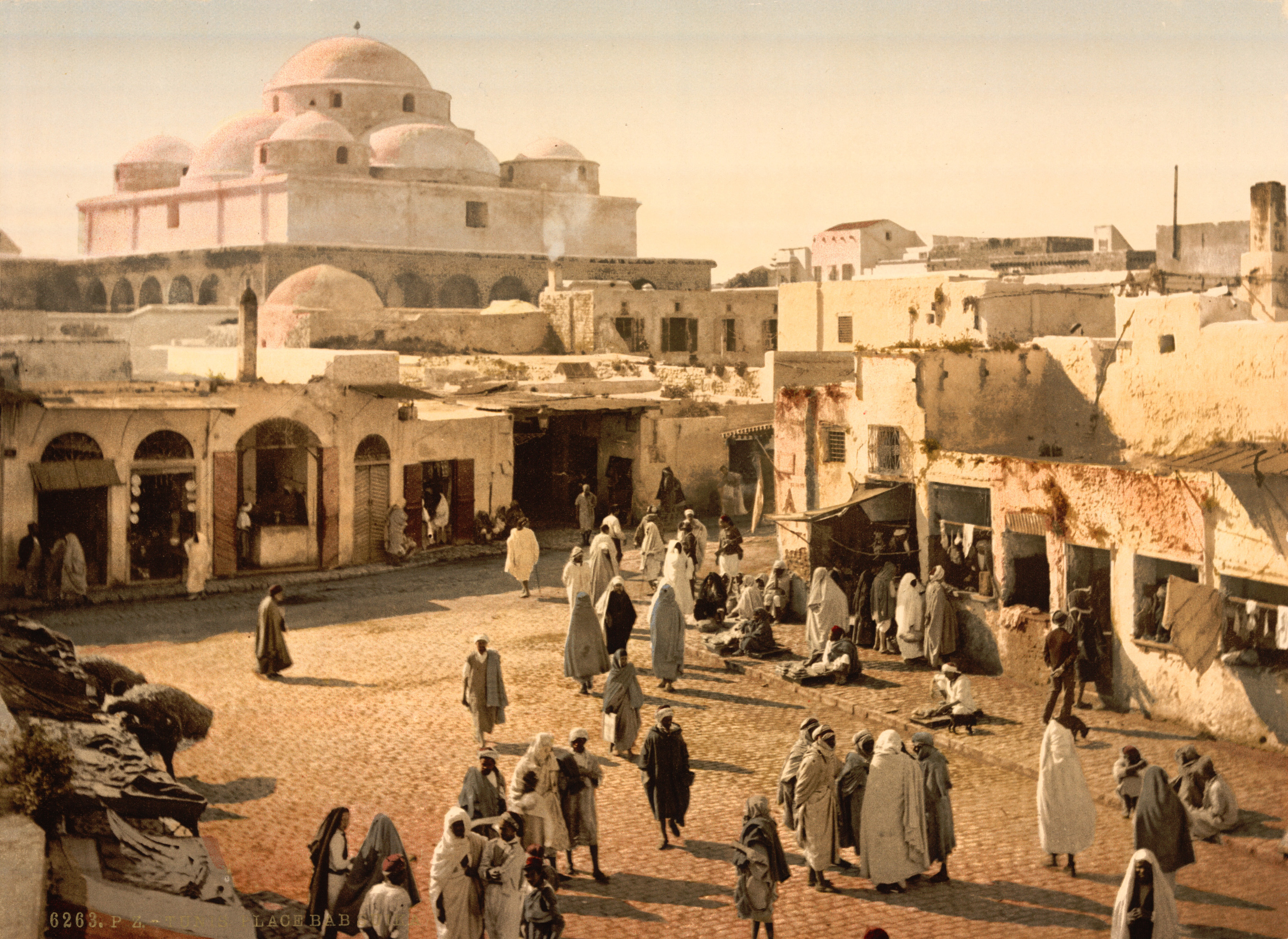

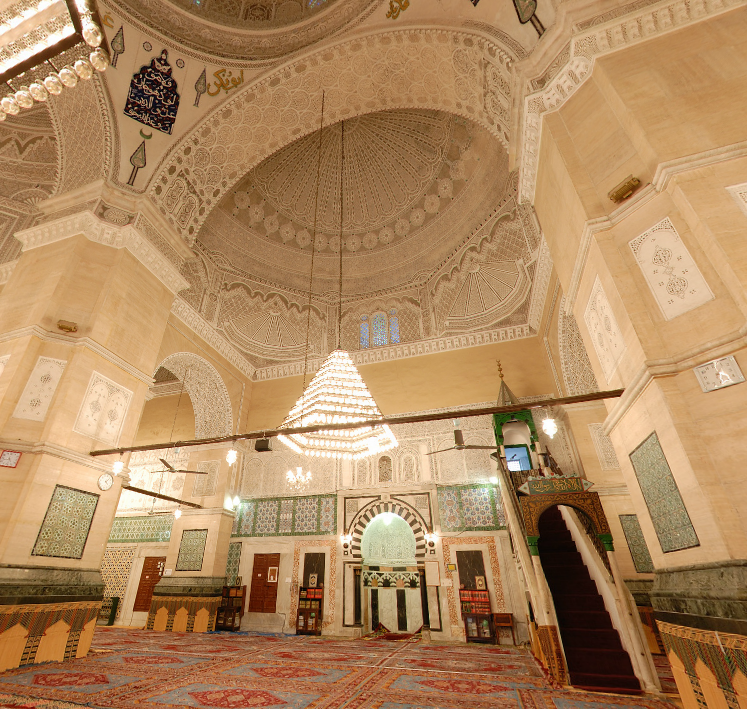

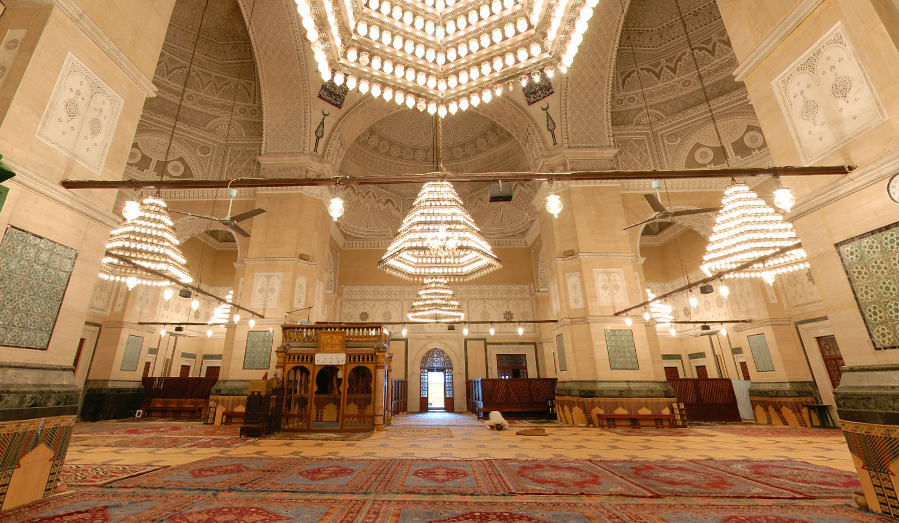

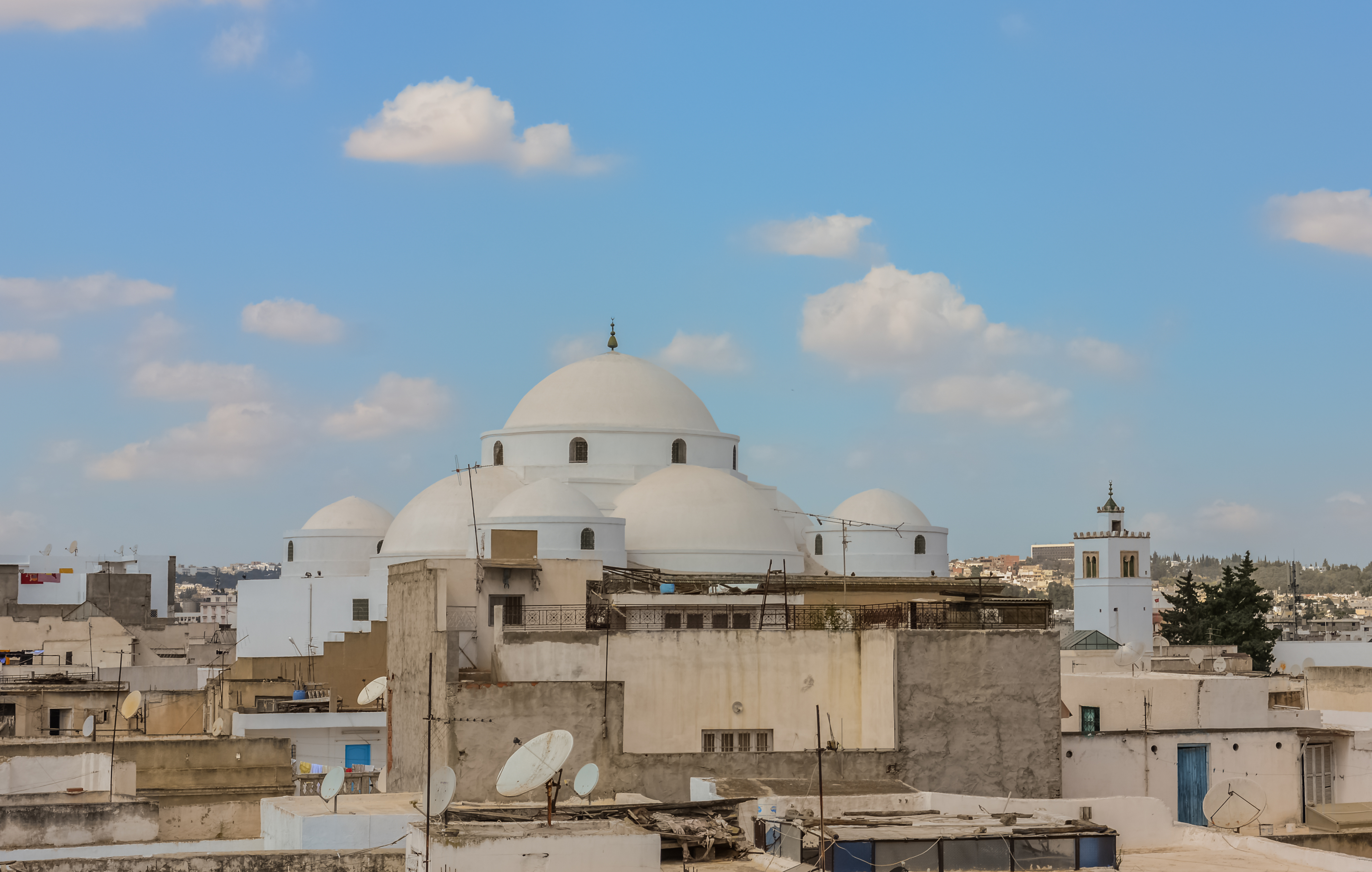
External view of the mosque

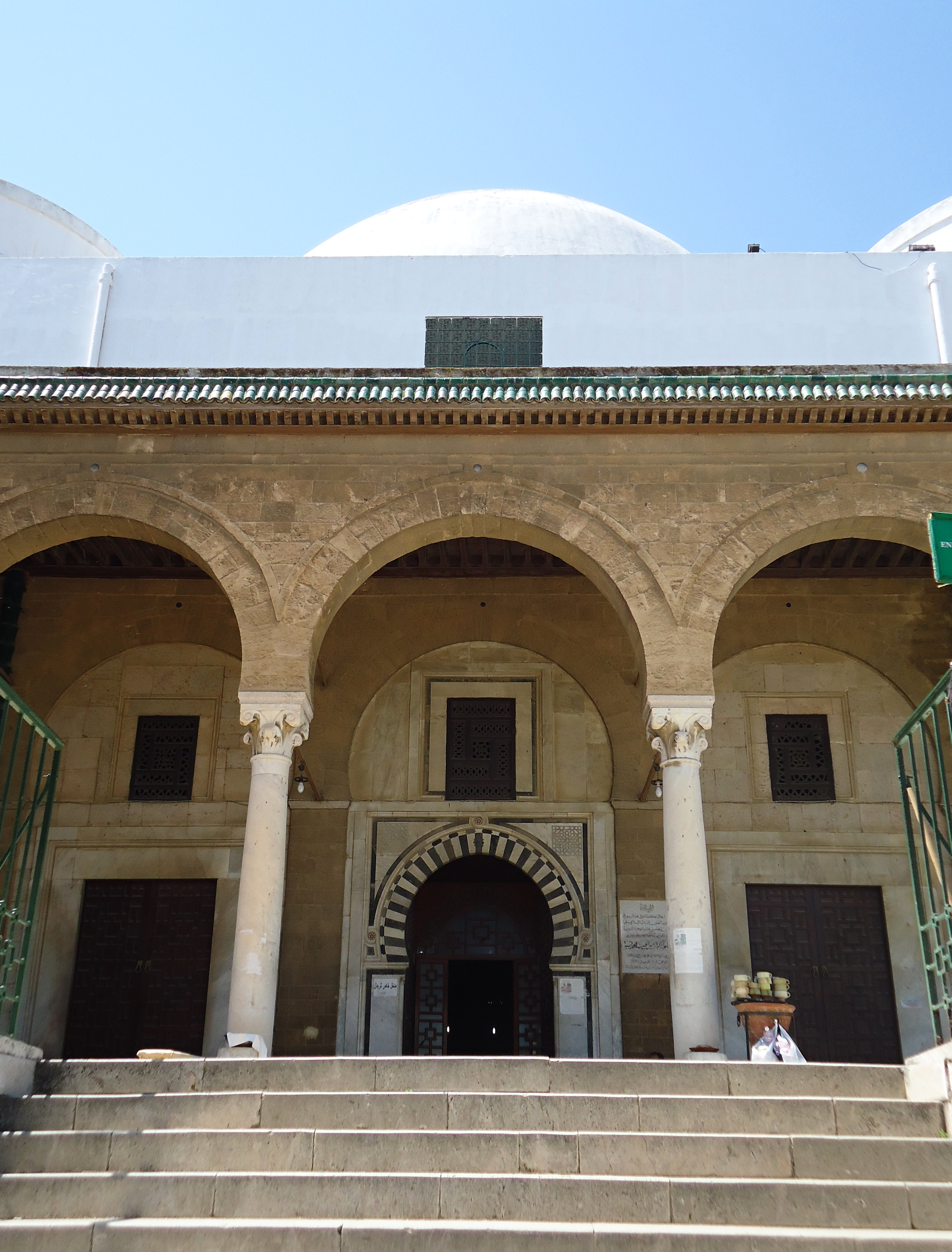
Entrance of the mosque

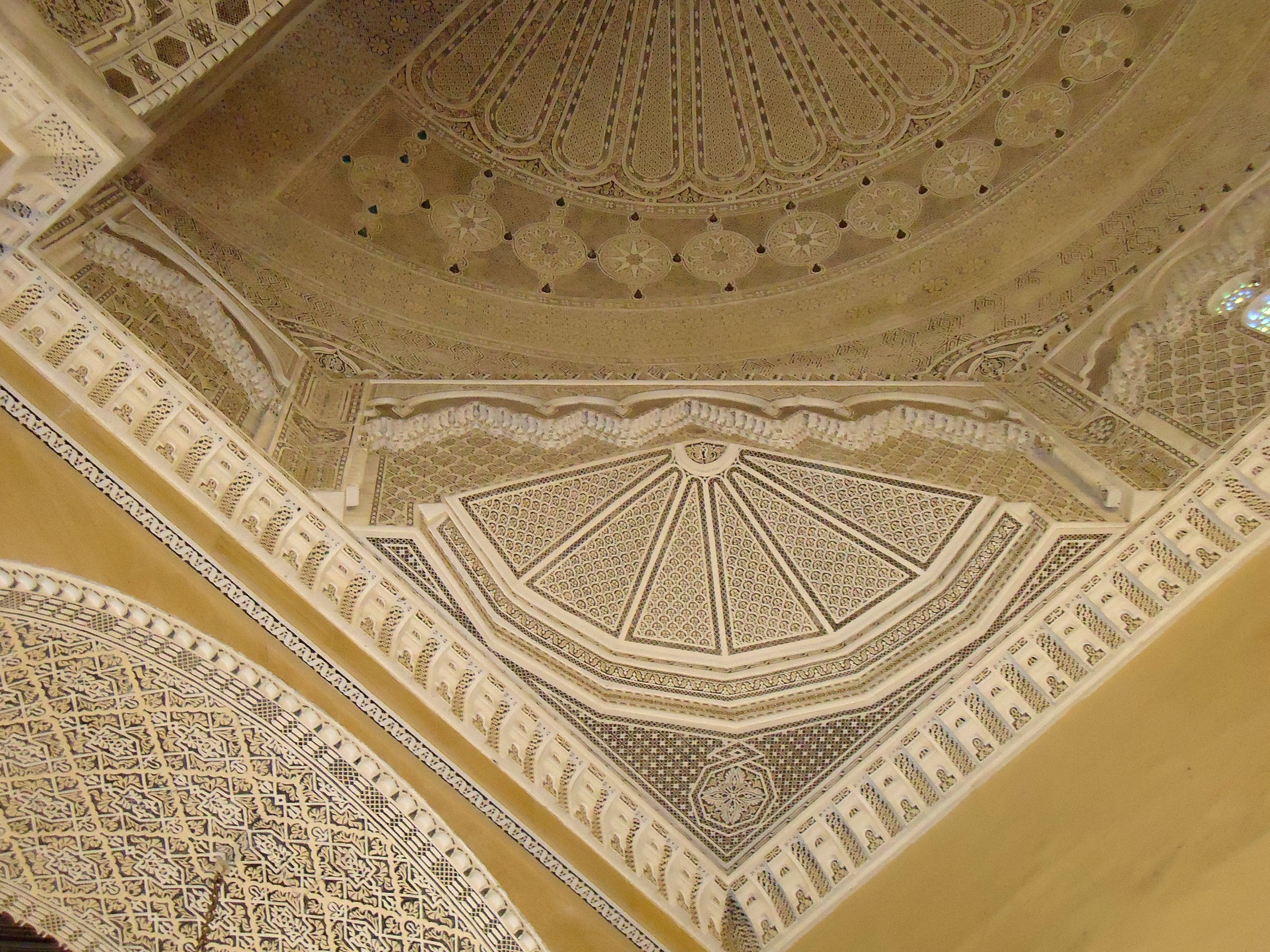
Decoration of the dome

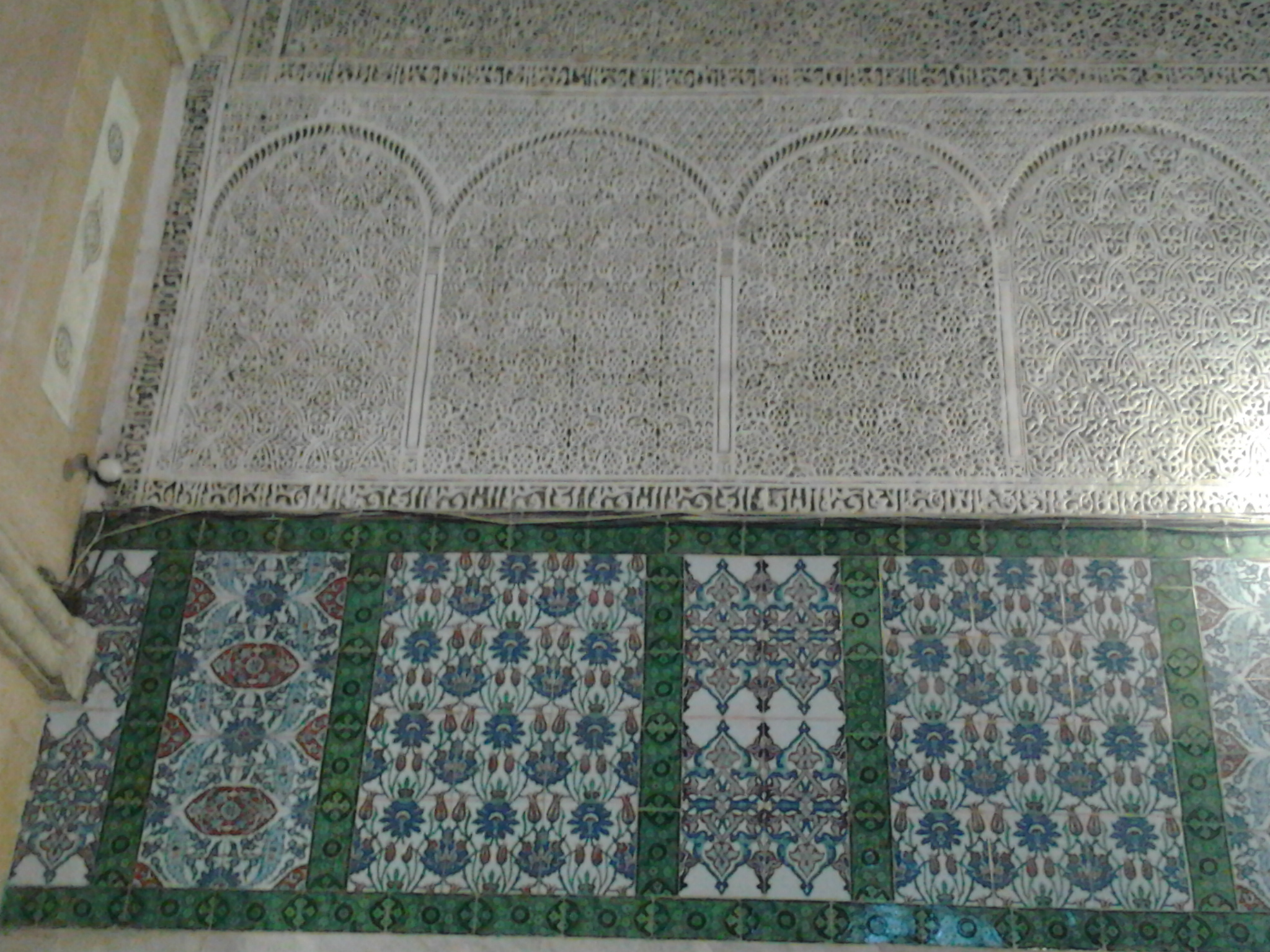
decoration of the mosque
