= 2008 FIBA Africa Women's Clubs Champions Cup squads =

This article displays the rosters for the participating teams at the 2008 FIBA Africa Club Championship for Women.

== Abidjan Basket Club ==
Abidjan Basket Club – 2008 FIBA Africa Women's Clubs Champions Cup – 4th place roster
Players							Coaches
Pos	#	Nat	Name	Height	Weight	Age	Head Coach
	4	(Democratic Republic of the Congo)	Nsuda Benga			27 November 1975 (aged 33)	(Ivory Coast) Seydou Badjan
	5	(Ivory Coast)	Ramatou Kone			8 June 1981 (aged 27)
	6	(Ivory Coast)	Mariam Gbane			16 April 1982 (aged 26)	Assistant coach(es)
	7	(Ivory Coast)	Adjheï Abbady			17 June 1987 (aged 21)
	8	(Ivory Coast)	Brou N'Goran			4 May 1987 (aged 21)
	9	(Ivory Coast)	Salimata Berte			7 May 1989 (aged 19)
	11	(Ivory Coast)	Fatoumata Kone			7 September 1988 (aged 20)
G	12	(Ivory Coast)	Aïchata Diomande	1.69 m (5 ft 6 1/2 in)		17 July 1984 (aged 24)
	13	(Senegal)	Ndeye Mbaye			14 January 1983 (aged 24)
	14	(Ivory Coast)	Maïmouna Coulibaly			29 July 1987 (aged 21)
	15	(Guinea)	Fatoumata Camara			16 July 1980 (aged 28)

== APR ==
APR – 2008 FIBA Africa Women's Clubs Champions Cup – 7th place roster
Players							Coaches
Pos	#	Nat	Name	Height	Weight	Age	Head Coach
	4	(Rwanda)	Jovithe Kabarere			12 July 1986 (aged 22)	(Croatia) Većeslav Kavedžija
	5	(Democratic Republic of the Congo)	Blandine Muleka			8 May 1983 (aged 25)
	6	(Rwanda)	Shaban Rehema			22 December 1983 (aged 24)	Assistant coach(es)
	7	(Rwanda)	Brenda Wasuda			7 May 1989 (aged 19)
	8	(Rwanda)	Alice Muhongerwa			21 October 1985 (aged 23)
	9	(Rwanda)	Joselyne Munyaneza			4 April 1984 (aged 24)
	10	(Rwanda)	Rutagengwa Uwizeyimana			23 August 1986 (aged 22)
	11	(Rwanda)	Salama Umutoni			3 January 1984 (aged 24)
	12	(Rwanda)	Purity Auma			20 October 1992 (aged 16)
	13	(Rwanda)	Claudette Imanishimwe			26 May 1982 (aged 26)
	14	(Rwanda)	Aline Sine			26 June 1982 (aged 26)
	15	(Democratic Republic of the Congo)	Kibinda Ndangi			26 March 1978 (aged 30)

== Club Sportif d'Abidjan ==
Club Sportif d'Abidjan – 2008 FIBA Africa Women's Clubs Champions Cup – 5th place roster
Players							Coaches
Pos	#	Nat	Name	Height	Weight	Age	Head Coach
G	4	(Ivory Coast)	Maimonatou Kolga	1.65 m (5 ft 5 in)		7 April 1992 (aged 16)	Joskan Kouakou
	5	(Ivory Coast)	Mariam Kolga			31 May 1983 (aged 25)
G	6	(Ivory Coast)	Assétou Kolga	1.70 m (5 ft 7 in)		24 April 1988 (aged 20)	Assistant coach(es)
	7	(Ivory Coast)	Halobo Bognini			23 October 1992 (aged 16)
	8	(Ivory Coast)	Yaba Animan			17 September 1978 (aged 30)
PF	9	(Ivory Coast)	Edjime Djedjemel	1.85 m (6 ft 1 in)		29 October 1988 (aged 20)
SG	10	(Ivory Coast)	Kani Kouyaté	1.78 m (5 ft 10 in)		8 August 1990 (aged 18)
F	11	(Ivory Coast)	Amandine Bognigni	1.86 m (6 ft 1 in)		10 July 1984 (aged 24)
PF	12	(Ivory Coast)	Karidja Traore	1.92 m (6 ft 3 1/2 in)		29 May 1992 (aged 16)
	13	(Ivory Coast)	Hadjaratou Diarra			31 August 1983 (aged 25)
F	14	(Ivory Coast)	Mariama Kouyate	1.80 m (5 ft 11 in)		18 June 1988 (aged 20)
C	15	(Ivory Coast)	Minata Fofana	1.93 m (6 ft 4 in)		22 March 1986 (aged 22)

== Desportivo de Maputo ==
Desportivo de Maputo – 2008 FIBA Africa Women's Clubs Champions Cup – Gold medal roster
Players							Coaches
Pos	#	Nat	Name	Height	Weight	Age	Head Coach
	4	(Mozambique)	Filomena Micato			26 January 1986 (aged 22)	(Mozambique) Nazir Salé
	5	(Mozambique)	Deolinda Ngulela			18 April 1981 (aged 27)
	6	(Mozambique)	Tânia Wachena			15 December 1985 (aged 22)	Assistant coach(es)
	7	(Mozambique)	Valerdina Manhonga			26 December 1980 (aged 27)
	8	(Mozambique)	Anabela Cossa			7 April 1986 (aged 22)
	9	(Mozambique)	Cátia Halar			28 November 1982 (aged 26)
	10	(Mozambique)	Diara Dessai			27 August 1977 (aged 31)
	11	(Mozambique)	Aleia Rachide			23 January 1985 (aged 23)
	12	(Puerto Rico) (United States)	Yolanda Jones			6 March 1984 (aged 24)
	13	(Senegal)	Sokhna Sy			17 October 1988 (aged 20)
	14	(Mozambique)	Odélia Mafanela			14 April 1989 (aged 19)
	15	(Mozambique)	Leia Dongue			24 May 1991 (aged 17)

== Djoliba ==
Djoliba – 2008 FIBA Africa Women's Clubs Champions Cup – 6th place roster
Players							Coaches
Pos	#	Nat	Name	Height	Weight	Age	Head Coach
	4	(Mali)	Nassira Traore			28 October 1988 (aged 20)
	5	(Senegal)	Adja Ba			9 August 1975 (aged 33)
	6	(Mali)	Aissata Maiga			21 March 1992 (aged 16)	Assistant coach(es)
	7	(Mali)	Oumou Kone			3 July 1979 (aged 29)
G	8	(Mali)	Aminata Seremé	1.68 m (5 ft 6 in)		1 January 1984 (aged 24)
	9	(Senegal)	Tenimba Sanogo			1 March 1991 (aged 17)
	10	(Senegal)	Ndeye Mbengue			28 November 1978 (aged 30)
C	11	(Mali)	Ramata Daou			23 March 1988 (aged 20)
	12	(Mali)	Tata Traore			12 June 1990 (aged 18)
	13	(Mali)	Mama Traore			15 August 1989 (aged 19)
	14	(Mali)	Aminata Mariko			23 June 1990 (aged 18)
	15	(Mali)	Minata Keita			15 March 1989 (aged 19)

== Eagle Wings ==
Eagle Wings – 2008 FIBA Africa Women's Clubs Champions Cup – 10th place roster
Players							Coaches
Pos	#	Nat	Name	Height	Weight	Age	Head Coach
	4	(Kenya)	Janet Okoth			18 June 1989 (aged 19)	(Kenya) Thomas Olumbo
	5	(Kenya)	Linda Nyikuli	1.75 m (5 ft 9 in)	80 kg (180 lb)	20 July 1987 (aged 21)
	6	(Kenya)	Eunice Ouma	1.68 m (5 ft 6 in)	75 kg (165 lb)	20 August 1978 (aged 30)	Assistant coach(es)
	7	(Kenya)	Maureen Andalia			12 April 1987 (aged 21)
	8	(Kenya)	Annastacia Mburu			26 August 1988 (aged 20)
	9	(Kenya)	Rebecca Sarange	1.68 m (5 ft 6 in)	76 kg (168 lb)	12 October 1982 (aged 26)
	10	(Kenya)	Everlyne Kedogo			27 September 1973 (aged 35)
	11	(Kenya)	Judith Juma			9 December 1981 (aged 26)
	12	(Kenya)	Mildred Osanjo			15 February 1981 (aged 27)
	13	(Kenya)	Volinet Wanyama			28 August 1984 (aged 24)
	14	(Kenya)	Caroline Achieng			7 September 1976 (aged 32)
	15	(Kenya)	Brigid Nyongesa			6 January 1983 (aged 25)

== First Bank ==
First Bank – 2008 FIBA Africa Women's Clubs Champions Cup – Bronze Medal roster
Players							Coaches
Pos	#	Nat	Name	Height	Weight	Age	Head Coach
	4	(Nigeria)	Bintu Bhadmus			10 November 1985 (aged 23)	(Nigeria) Adewunmi Aderemi
	5	(Nigeria)	Nwamaka Adibeli			10 March 1985 (aged 23)
	6	(Nigeria)	Sandra German			20 July 1984 (aged 24)	Assistant coach(es)
	7	(Nigeria)	Adenike Dawdu			9 November 1984 (aged 24)
	8	(Nigeria)	Funmilayo Ojelabi			25 January 1985 (aged 23)
	9	(Nigeria)	Catherine Nzekwe			14 April 1986 (aged 22)
	10	(Nigeria)	Joyce Ekworomadu			6 August 1986 (aged 22)
F	11	(Nigeria) (United States)	Mfon Udoka	1.90 m (6 ft 3 in)		16 June 1976 (aged 32)
	12	(Nigeria) (United States)	Viola Beybeyah			9 December 1985 (aged 22)
	13	(Nigeria)	Erdoo Angwe			19 March 1987 (aged 21)
	14	(Nigeria)	Priscilla Udeaja			29 June 1984 (aged 24)
	15	(Nigeria)	Ezinne James			22 June 1985 (aged 23)

== KCC Leopards ==
KCC Leopards – 2008 FIBA Africa Women's Clubs Champions Cup – 12th place roster
Players							Coaches
Pos	#	Nat	Name	Height	Weight	Age	Head Coach
	4	(Uganda)	Diana Namukusa			18 December 1979 (aged 28)	(Uganda) Mande Juruni
	5	(Uganda)	Monica Siima			29 July 1976 (aged 32)
	6	(Uganda)	Rebecca Akullo			28 May 1983 (aged 25)	Assistant coach(es)
	7	(Uganda)	Juliete Sabano			7 July 1973 (aged 35)
	8	(Uganda)	Nahabo Hamala			5 July 1982 (aged 26)
	9	(Uganda)	Carol Nantalo			28 July 1986 (aged 22)
	10	(Uganda)	Linda Tamale			29 February 1984 (aged 24)
	11	(Uganda)	Grace-Mary Akello			11 August 1989 (aged 19)
	12	(Uganda)	Edith Nakiriyowa			17 March 1964 (aged 44)
	13	(Uganda)	Sumine Nabatanzi			25 August 1981 (aged 27)
	14	(Uganda)	Annet Nakiwu			12 December 1974 (aged 33)
	15	(Uganda)	Proscovia Peace			1 November 1989 (aged 19)

== Kenya Ports Authority ==
Kenya Ports Authority – 2008 FIBA Africa Women's Clubs Champions Cup – 8th place roster
Players							Coaches
Pos	#	Nat	Name	Height	Weight	Age	Head Coach
	4	(Kenya)	Susan Okech			29 December 1982 (aged 25)	(Kenya) Anthony Ojukwu
	5	(Kenya)	Helen Oketch			24 April 1992 (aged 16)
	6	(Kenya)	Caroline Mureji			8 October 1979 (aged 29)	Assistant coach(es)
	7	(Kenya)	Mwajuma Makau			26 June 1980 (aged 28)
	8	(Kenya)	Everlyne Olang			2 April 1987 (aged 21)
	9	(Kenya)	Brenda Jumba			19 September 1986 (aged 22)
	10	(Kenya)	Carolyne Aratoh			25 October 1973 (aged 35)
	11	(Kenya)	Irene Murambi			24 January 1978 (aged 30)
	12	(Kenya)	Yvonne Odhiambo			26 February 1988 (aged 20)
	13	(Kenya)	Joyce Memba			7 November 1972 (aged 36)
	14	(Kenya)	Agnes Anyango			13 January 1978 (aged 30)
	15	(Kenya)	Velma Juma			3 May 1986 (aged 21)

== Primeiro de Agosto ==
Primeiro de Agosto – 2008 FIBA Africa Women's Clubs Champions Cup – Silver medal roster
Players							Coaches
Pos	#	Nat	Name	Height	Weight	Age	Head Coach
	4	(Angola)	Fineza Eusébio			18 July 1990 (aged 18)	(Angola) Higino Garcia
	5	(Democratic Republic of the Congo)	Bokomba Masela			27 September 1969 (aged 39)
	6	(Angola)	Domitila Ventura			28 November 1978 (aged 30)	Assistant coach(es)
	7	(Angola)	Ângela Cardoso			9 April 1979 (aged 29)
	8	(Angola)	Isabel Francisco			21 July 1980 (aged 28)
	9	(Angola)	Sofia Capinga			29 May 1982 (aged 26)
	10	(Angola)	Sónia Guadalupe			15 September 1985 (aged 23)
	11	(Angola)	Luísa Tomás			24 March 1983 (aged 25)
	12	(Angola)	Astrida Vicente			6 October 1978 (aged 30)
	13	(Angola)	Nacissela Maurício			2 June 1980 (aged 28)
	14	(Cape Verde)	Crispina Correia			5 November 1975 (aged 33)
	15	(Angola)	Jaquelina Francisco			16 March 1978 (aged 30)

== Radi ==
Radi – 2008 FIBA Africa Women's Clubs Champions Cup – 9th place roster
Players							Coaches
Pos	#	Nat	Name	Height	Weight	Age	Head Coach
	4	(Democratic Republic of the Congo)	Cele Mianda			21 October 1990 (aged 18)	[[]]
	5	(Democratic Republic of the Congo)	Ukete Lukokesha			24 April 1981 (aged 27)
	7	(Democratic Republic of the Congo)	Fara Mukunday			4 July 1990 (aged 18)	Assistant coach(es)
	8	(Democratic Republic of the Congo)	Matundu Masiala			14 April 1978 (aged 30)
	9	(Democratic Republic of the Congo)	Cecile Nyoka	1.77 m (5 ft 9 1/2 in)		18 September 1986 (aged 22)
	10	(Democratic Republic of the Congo)	Mireille Nyota			2 February 1990 (aged 18)
	11	(Democratic Republic of the Congo)	Mbula Ilunga			25 November 1990 (aged 18)
	12	(Democratic Republic of the Congo)	Felekeni Bamati			25 December 1979 (aged 28)
	13	(Democratic Republic of the Congo)	Nicole Mubalo			5 November 1992 (aged 16)
	14	(Democratic Republic of the Congo)	Musau Kalundu			30 November 1977 (aged 30)
	15	(Democratic Republic of the Congo)	Ngusu Mafuta			23 February 1989 (aged 19)

== Vita Club ==
Vita Club – 2008 FIBA Africa Women's Clubs Champions Cup – 11th place roster
Players							Coaches
Pos	#	Nat	Name	Height	Weight	Age	Head Coach
	4	(Democratic Republic of the Congo)	Flavie Ngono	1.69 m (5 ft 6 1/2 in)		4 July 1986 (aged 22)	[[]]
	5	(Democratic Republic of the Congo)	Bébé Dianda			30 June 1987 (aged 21)
	6	(Democratic Republic of the Congo)	Sylvie Bituli			7 May 1982 (aged 26)	Assistant coach(es)
	7	(Democratic Republic of the Congo)	Mayindu Bakayukila			25 December 1981 (aged 26)
	8	(Democratic Republic of the Congo)	Felly Mosanza			31 December 1974 (aged 33)
	10	(Democratic Republic of the Congo)	Betty Tshiniangu	1.84 m (6 ft 1/2 in)		5 January 1987 (aged 21)
	12	(Democratic Republic of the Congo)	Tyty Amba			10 October 1983 (aged 25)
	13	(Democratic Republic of the Congo)	Nathalie Kabeya			8 August 1985 (aged 23)
	14	(Democratic Republic of the Congo)	Mokaleba Manteka			13 November 1968 (aged 40)
