= 2006 FIBA Africa Under-20 Championship for Women squads =

2006 FIBA Africa U-20 Championship for Women squads

This article displays the rosters for the participating teams at the 2006 FIBA Africa Under-20 Championship for Women.

== Angola ==
Angola women's national U20 basketball team - 2006 FIBA Africa Championship – 5th place roster
Players
Coaches

Pos.	No.	Name	Age – Date of birth	Height	Club	Ctr.
	4	Eva Silva	19 – 22 December 1986	0 m (0 in)
	5	Catarina Eusébio	18 – 11 September 1988	0 m (0 in)
G	6	Fineza Eusébio	16 – 18 July 1990	0 m (0 in)
	7	Marisa Nsiame	20 – 9 September 1986	0 m (0 in)
	8	Madalena Felix	17 – 20 September 1989	0 m (0 in)
	9	Samba Eduardo	19 – 26 January 1987	0 m (0 in)
	10	Yara Santos	20 – 6 March 1986	0 m (0 in)
	11	Etelvina Cristiano	19 – 7 November 1987	186 m (610 ft 3 in)	Interclube
	12	Vera Miguel	20 – 17 April 1986	0 m (0 in)
F	13	Nadir Manuel	20 – 30 November 1986	1.85 m (6 ft 1 in)
C	14	Angelina Golome	18 – 23 March 1988	1.90 m (6 ft 3 in)
	15	Cláudia António	20 – 27 May 1986	0 m (0 in)

Head coach

- (Angola) Aníbal Moreira

Assistant coach

- (Angola) André Manuel

Legend

- (C) Team captain
- Club field describes current club

== Mali ==
Mali women's national U20 basketball team - 2006 FIBA Africa Championship – Silver Medal roster
Players
Coaches

Pos.	No.	Name	Age – Date of birth	Height	Club	Ctr.
	4	Nassira Traore	18 – 28 October 1988	1.81 m (5 ft 11 in)
	5	Kadia Sacko	18 – 25 April 1988	0 m (0 in)
	6	Laoudy Maiga	16 – 15 October 1990	1.65 m (5 ft 5 in)
	7	Mama Traore	16 – 13 November 1990	0 m (0 in)
	8	Ramata Goita	16 – 5 February 1990	0 m (0 in)
	9	Fatoumata Bagayoko	18 – 23 May 1988	1.70 m (5 ft 7 in)
	10	Fanta Toure	17 – 18 February 1989	0 m (0 in)
	11	Minata Keita	17 – 15 March 1989	0 m (0 in)
	12	Fatoumata Traoré	16 – 10 June 1990	0 m (0 in)
	13	Aïssata Bore	17 – 12 June 1989	0 m (0 in)
	14	Ouleymatou Coulibaly	16 – 15 July 1990	0 m (0 in)
C	15	Naignouma Coulibaly	17 – 31 May 1989	1.92 m (6 ft 4 in)

Head coach

Assistant coach

Legend

- (C) Team captain
- Club field describes current club

== Mozambique ==
Mozambique women's national U20 basketball team - 2006 FIBA Africa Championship – Gold Medal roster
Players
Coaches

Pos.	No.	Name	Age – Date of birth	Height	Club	Ctr.
	4	Filomena Micato	20 – 26 January 1986	1.68 m (5 ft 6 in)
	5	Josefina Jafar	20 – 26 September 1986	0 m (0 in)
	6	Esmeralda Casimiro	18 – 22 October 1988	0 m (0 in)
	7	Nádia Zucule	19 – 15 February 1987	0 m (0 in)
	8	Janet Monteiro	19 – 2 February 1987	0 m (0 in)
	9	Anabela Cossa	20 – 7 April 1986	1.72 m (5 ft 8 in)
	10	Vaneza Júnior	20 – 7 September 1986	0 m (0 in)
	11	Sílvia Neves	19 – 17 February 1987	0 m (0 in)
	12	Odélia Mafanela	17 – 14 April 1989	1.80 m (5 ft 11 in)
	13	Cláudia Chembene	20 – 1 August 1986	0 m (0 in)
	14	Nádia Rosário	20 – 14 May 1986	0 m (0 in)
C	15	Deolinda Gimo	19 – 15 August 1987	1.90 m (6 ft 3 in)

Head coach

Assistant coach

Legend

- (C) Team captain
- Club field describes current club

== Senegal ==
Senegal women's national U20 basketball team - 2006 FIBA Africa Championship – Bronze Medal roster
Players
Coaches

Pos.	No.	Name	Age – Date of birth	Height	Club	Ctr.
	4	Marie Gomis	20 – 28 October 1986	0 m (0 in)
	5	Fatoumata Diango	20 – 24 April 1986	0 m (0 in)
G	6	Nene Diame	20 – 2 April 1986	1.70 m (5 ft 7 in)
	7	Fanta Lèye	19 – 3 February 1987	0 m (0 in)
	8	Ndèye Sène	18 – 18 January 1988	1.61 m (5 ft 3 in)
	9	Tening Diata	20 – 7 February 1986	0 m (0 in)
	10	Sokhna Sy	18 – 17 October 1988	0 m (0 in)
	11	Mariama Dabo	19 – 3 April 1987	0 m (0 in)
	12	Magatte Sarr	19 – 16 December 1986	0 m (0 in)
	13	Maty Diallo	19 – 8 October 1987	0 m (0 in)
	14	Aïcha Ndao	17 – 18 March 1989	0 m (0 in)
	15	Bineta Ndiaye	17 – 18 March 1989	0 m (0 in)

Head coach

Assistant coach

Legend

- (C) Team captain
- Club field describes current club

== South Africa ==
South Africa women's national U20 basketball team - 2006 FIBA Africa Championship – 4th place roster
Players
Coaches

Pos.	No.	Name	Age – Date of birth	Height	Club	Ctr.
	4	Adele Johnson	20 – 1 March 1986	0 m (0 in)
	5	Cleopatra Mocholo	18 – 11 December 1987	0 m (0 in)
	6	Nathaly September	20 – 3 February 1986	0 m (0 in)
	7	Jermaine Kermis	19 – 24 March 1987	0 m (0 in)
	8	Gontse Molantoa	20 – 20 April 1986	0 m (0 in)
	9	Takalani Mfamadi	18 – 26 October 1988	0 m (0 in)
	10	Ellen Moutlwatse	20 – 27 February 1986	0 m (0 in)
	11	Khanyisile Zondi	20 – 20 March 1986	0 m (0 in)
	12	Kgaugelo Phiri	19 – 11 May 1987	0 m (0 in)
	13	Itumeleng Khoabane	19 – 16 August 1987	0 m (0 in)
	14	Bervelly Mabuya	19 – 14 June 1987	0 m (0 in)
	15	Anele Ngcongo	19 – 22 December 1986	0 m (0 in)

Head coach

Assistant coach

Legend

- (C) Team captain
- Club field describes current club

== See also ==
- 2006 FIBA Africa U-20 Championship squads
