= 2006 FIBA Africa Under-18 Championship for Women =

2006 FIBA U18 Women's AfroBasket
8th FIBA Under-18 Women's African Basketball Championship

Tournament details
- Host country: Benin
- Dates: 8–16 September 2006
- Teams: 5 (from 53 federations)
- Venue: 1 (in 1 host city)

Final positions
- Champions: Mali (3rd title)

Tournament statistics
- MVP: (Mali) Fanta Toure
- Top scorer: (Ivory Coast) Kouyate 19.7
- Top rebounds: (Mali) Coulibaly 11.5
- Top assists: (Mali) Toure 2.8
- PPG (Team): Mali 69.3
- RPG (Team): DR Congo 45.2
- APG (Team): Mali 9.8

Official website
- 2006 FIBA Africa Under-18 Championship for Women

The 2006 FIBA Africa Under-18 Championship for Women was the 8th FIBA Africa Under-18 Championship for Women, played under the rules of FIBA, the world governing body for basketball, and the FIBA Africa thereof. The tournament was hosted by Benin from 8 to 16 September 2006.

Mali defeated Ivory Coast 77-66 in the final to win their third title with both winner and runner-up qualifying for the 2007 FIBA U19 Women's World Cup.

== Participating teams ==
Angola
Benin
DR Congo
Ivory Coast
Mali

== Schedule ==
Qualified for the semi-finals

P	Team	M	W	L	PF	PA	Diff	Pts.
1	Mali	4	0	0	259	183	+76	8
2	DR Congo	4	2	2	229	234	-5	6
3	Ivory Coast	4	2	2	214	182	+32	6
4	Benin	4	1	3	181	237	-56	5
5	Angola	4	1	3	167	214	-47	5

8 September
17:00

Boxscore

Benin	46–58	Mali
Scoring by quarter: 9-18, 14-21, 10-13, 13-6
Pts: Adomou 12; Rebs: Inoussa 5 Asts: Ladani 1		Pts: F.Toure 18; Rebs: N.Coulibaly 3 Asts: Diakité 3

Cotonou

9 September

Angola	27–51	Ivory Coast
Scoring by quarter: n/a, n/a
Pts: n/a Rebs: n/a		Pts: n/a Rebs: n/a

Cotonou

10 September
16:00

Boxscore

Ivory Coast	58–60	DR Congo
Scoring by quarter: 16-5, 13-16, 16-20, 13-19
Pts: K.Kouyate 24; Rebs: Djedjemel 9 Asts: four players 1		Pts: Tshiyoyo 14; Rebs: Mafuta 12; Asts: Mikemo 6

Cotonou

18:00

Boxscore

Mali	69–37	Angola
Scoring by quarter: 15-3, 16-11, 19-9, 19-14
Pts: Keita 14; Rebs: Keita, N.Coulibaly 8 Asts: Bagayoko, F.Toure 2		Pts: Felícia 10; Rebs: Madalena 9 Asts: Elsa 1

Cotonou

11 September
16:00

Boxscore

Ivory Coast	58–62	Mali
Scoring by quarter: 21-10, 1-12, 7-18, 29-22
Pts: K.Kouyate 19; Rebs: K.Kouyate, M.Kouyate 7 Asts: Kassi 2		Pts: Bagayoko 23; Rebs: Bagayoko, F.Toure 9 Asts: F.Toure 7

Cotonou

18:00

Boxscore

DR Congo	87–48	Benin
Scoring by quarter: 19-8, 30-8, 20-13, 18-19
Pts: Makiese 15; Rebs: Makiese 9 Asts: Mabibi, Mafuta 2		Pts: Adomou 11; Rebs: Zossou 7 Asts: Zossou 2

Cotonou

12 September
16:00

Boxscore

DR Congo	42–70	Mali
Scoring by quarter: 13-24, 6-17, 16-11, 7-18
Pts: Mabibi 12; Rebs: Tshiyoyo 9 Asts: Mabibi 2		Pts: N.Coulibaly 16; Rebs: N.Coulibaly 27; Asts: N.Coulibaly, F.Toure 2

Cotonou

18:00

Boxscore

Benin	54–45	Angola
Scoring by quarter: 13-14, 18-4, 9-17, 14-10
Pts: Adomou 17; Rebs: Bouraïma 18; Asts: Klouste 3		Pts: Catarina 22; Rebs: Angelina 15; Asts: Fineza 4

Cotonou

13 September
16:00

Boxscore

Angola	58–40	DR Congo
Scoring by quarter: 16-14, 14-7, 13-16, 15-3
Pts: Catarina 27; Rebs: Angelina 17; Asts: Elsa, Fineza 2		Pts: Butayi 15; Rebs: Makiese 13; Asts: Mabibi 3

Cotonou

Boxscore

Benin	33–47	Ivory Coast
Scoring by quarter: 6-16, 2-8, 10-12, 15-11
Pts: Babalola 14; Rebs: Babalola 7 Asts: three players 1		Pts: K.Kouyate 15; Rebs: A.Kolga, M.Kouyate 9 Asts: Kassi 4

Cotonou

== Knockout stage ==
Championship bracket

Semi-finals
Fri 15 Sep 2006 – 16:00
Mali	80
Benin	47
Fri 15 Sep 2006 – 18:00
DR Congo	57
Ivory Coast	69

Final
Sat 16 Sep 2006 – 18:00
Mali	77
Ivory Coast	66
Third place
Sat 16 Sep 2006 – 16:00
Benin	44
DR Congo	85

=== Semifinals ===
15 September
16:00

Boxscore

Mali	80–47	Benin
Scoring by quarter: 26-9, 16-7, 23-8, 15-23
Pts: N.Coulibaly 14; Rebs: N.Coulibaly 11; Asts: Bagayoko, F.Toure 2		Pts: Inoussa 15; Rebs: Klouste 6 Asts: four players 1

Cotonou

18:00

Boxscore

DR Congo	57–69	Ivory Coast
Scoring by quarter: 10-16, 16-15, 14-18, 17-20
Pts: Mafuta 15; Rebs: Mafuta, Tshiyoyo 8 Asts: Mafuta, Mabibi 2		Pts: K.Kouyate 21; Rebs: M.Kouyate 14; Asts: A.Kolga 4

Cotonou

=== Bronze medal match ===
16 September
16:00

Boxscore

Benin	44–85	DR Congo
Scoring by quarter: 8-24, 13-19, 11-20, 12-22
Pts: Inoussa 11; Rebs: Sousa 8 Asts: Inoussa, Klouste 3		Pts: Makiese 24; Rebs: Makiese 14; Asts: Mabibi 7

Cotonou

=== Final ===
16 September
18:00

Boxscore

Mali	77–66	Ivory Coast
Scoring by quarter: 19-5, 14-17, 27-21, 17-23
Pts: F.Toure 31; Rebs: N.Coulibaly 17; Asts: Bagayoko 6		Pts: K.Kouyate 26; Rebs: K.Kouyate 11; Asts: A.Kolga 4

Cotonou

== Final standings ==
Qualified for the 2007 FIBA U19 Women's World Cup

Rank	Team	Record
Gold medal	Mali	6–0
Silver medal	Ivory Coast	3–3
Bronze medal	DR Congo	3–3
4	Benin	1–5
5	Angola	1–3

Mali roster
Aïssata Bore, Fanta Toure, Fatoumata Bagayoko, Fatoumata Traoré, Kadia Sacko, Kadiatou Coulibaly, Kama Dembélé, Minata Keita, Naignouma Coulibaly, Nassira Traoré, Ouleymatou Coulibaly, Sira Diakité, Coach:

== Awards ==
2006 FIBA Africa Under-18 Championship for Women winner

Mali
Third title

Most Valuable Player
(Mali) Fanta Toure

=== All-Tournament Team ===
- (Mali) Fanta Toure
- (Angola) Catarina Eusébio
- (Ivory Coast) Kani Kouyate
- (Democratic Republic of the Congo) Diane Mabibi
- (Mali) Naignouma Coulibaly

== Statistical leaders ==
=== Individual Tournament Highs ===
Points

Rank	Name	G	Pts	PPG
1	(Ivory Coast) Kani Kouyate	6	118	19.7
2	(Angola) Catarina Eusébio	6	70	17.5
3	(Mali) Fanta Toure	6	95	15.8
4	(Mali) Fatoumata Bagayoko	6	76	12.7
5	(Ivory Coast) Mariama Kouyate	6	73	12.2
6	(Democratic Republic of the Congo) Ginette Makiese	6	72	12
7	(Democratic Republic of the Congo) Mireille Tshiyoyo	6	64	10.7
8	(Mali) Naignouma Coulibaly	6	56	9.3
9	(Benin) Sandrine Adomou	6	54	9
10	(Democratic Republic of the Congo) Ngusu Mafuta	6	53	8.8

Rebounds

Rank	Name	G	Rbs	RPG
1	(Mali) Naignouma Coulibaly	6	69	11.5
2	(Angola) Angelina Golome	4	38	9.5
3	(Ivory Coast) Mariama Kouyate	6	54	9
3	(Democratic Republic of the Congo) Ginette Makiese	6	54	9
5	(Egypt) Catarina Eusébio	4	36	9
6	(Democratic Republic of the Congo) Ngusu Mafuta	6	45	7.5
7	(Democratic Republic of the Congo) Mireille Tshiyoyo	6	43	7.2
8	(Mali) Minata Keita	6	39	6.5
9	(Angola) Madalena Felix	4	24	6
10	(Ivory Coast) Kani Kouyate	6	35	5.8

Assists

Rank	Name	G	Ast	APG
1	(Mali) Fanta Toure	6	17	2.8
2	(Mali) Fatoumata Bagayoko	6	16	2.7
2	(Democratic Republic of the Congo) Diane Mabibi	6	16	2.7
4	(Democratic Republic of the Congo) Nadine Mikemo	4	9	2.3
5	(Ivory Coast) Assetou Kolga	6	13	2.2
6	(Democratic Republic of the Congo) Ngusu Mafuta	6	10	1.7
7	(Angola) Fineza Eusébio	4	6	1.5
8	(Democratic Republic of the Congo) Thérèse Bakenga	6	8	1.3
8	(Benin) Emmanuelle Klouste	6	8	1.3
8	(Ivory Coast) Mariama Kouyate	6	8	1.3

Steals

Rank	Name	G	Sts	SPG
1	(Angola) Catarina Eusébio	4	15	3.8
2	(Ivory Coast) Kani Kouyate	6	22	3.7
3	(Ivory Coast) Assetou Kolga	6	19	3.2
4	(Benin) Kèfilath Inoussa	6	11	1.8
5	(Benin) Sandrine Adomou	6	10	1.7
5	(Democratic Republic of the Congo) Diane Mabibi	6	10	1.7
7	(Ivory Coast) Mariama Kouyate	6	9	1.5
8	(Mali) Fatoumata Bagayoko	6	8	1.3
9	(Democratic Republic of the Congo) Thérère Bakenga	6	7	1.2
10	(Ivory Coast) Edjime Djedjemel	6	6	1

Blocks

Rank	Name	G	Bks	BPG
1	(Democratic Republic of the Congo) Ginette Makiese	6	11	1.8
2	(Mali) Naignouma Coulibaly	6	8	1.3
3	(Democratic Republic of the Congo) Ngusu Mafuta	6	6	1
4	(Mali) Minata Keita	6	5	0.8
5	(Mali) Sira Diakité	6	3	0.5
5	(Ivory Coast) Mariama Kouyate	6	3	0.5
5	(Mali) Fanta Toure	6	3	0.5
8	(Angola) Elsa Eduardo	4	2	0.5
8	(Democratic Republic of the Congo) Blandine Waki	4	2	0.5
10	(Mali) Fatoumata Bagayoko	6	2	0.3

Turnovers

Rank	Name	G	Tos	TPG
1	(Benin) Kèfilath Inoussa	6	29	4.8
2	(Mali) Fanta Toure	6	28	4.7
3	(Democratic Republic of the Congo) Diane Mabibi	6	26	4.3
4	(Angola) Catarina Eusébio	4	15	3.8
5	(Mali) Minata Keita	6	22	3.7
5	(Benin) Emmanuele Klouste	6	22	3.7
5	(Ivory Coast) Assetou Kolga	6	22	3.7
5	(Ivory Coast) Kani Kouyate	6	22	3.7
9	(Ivory Coast) Mariama Kouyate	6	21	3.5
9	(Benin) Ghislaine Zossou	6	21	3.5

2-point field goal percentage

Pos	Name	A	M	%
1	(Mali) Fanta Toure	54	39	72.2
2	(Democratic Republic of the Congo) Ginette Makiese	53	29	54.7
3	(Mali) Naignouma Coulibaly	41	22	53.7
4	(Democratic Republic of the Congo) Mireille Tshiyoyo	51	23	45.1
5	(Ivory Coast) Kani Kouyate	84	37	44
6	(Ivory Coast) Edjime Djedjemel	37	16	43.2
7	(Ivory Coast) Mariama Kouyate	63	27	42.9
8	(Mali) Minata Keita	52	22	42.3
9	(Angola) Catarina Eusébio	57	22	38.6
10	(Democratic Republic of the Congo) Ngusu Mafuta	42	16	38.1

3-point field goal percentage

Pos	Name	A	M	%
1	(Mali) Fatoumata Traoré	10	4	40
2	(Ivory Coast) Maimonatou Kolga	13	5	38.5
3	(Ivory Coast) Souko Thiam	12	3	25
4	(Democratic Republic of the Congo) Nadine Mikemo	8	2	25
5	(Mali) Fatoumata Bagayoko	37	9	24.3
6	(Benin) Sandrine Adomou	27	5	18.5
7	(Democratic Republic of the Congo) Diane Mabibi	29	5	17.2
8	(Benin) Kèfilath Inoussi	36	6	16.7
9	(Democratic Republic of the Congo) Thèrése Bakenga	13	2	15.4
9	(Mali) Fanta Toure	13	2	15.4

Free throw percentage

Pos	Name	A	M	%
1	(Democratic Republic of the Congo) Ngusu Mafuta	28	21	75
2	(Democratic Republic of the Congo) Diane Mabibi	19	13	68.4
3	(Democratic Republic of the Congo) Mireille Tshiyoyo	27	18	66.7
4	(Mali) Fatoumata Bagayoko	20	13	65
5	(Benin) Sandrine Adomou	18	11	61.1
6	(Benin) Kèfilath Inoussa	23	14	60.9
7	(Ivory Coast) Kani Kouyate	65	38	58.5
8	(Democratic Republic of the Congo) Thérèse Bakenga	22	12	54.5
9	(Angola) Joana Baptista	15	8	53.3
10	(Benin) Ghislaine Zossou	19	10	52.6

=== Individual Game Highs ===
Department	Name	Total	Opponent
Points	(Mali) Fanta Toure	31	Ivory Coast
Rebounds	(Mali) Naignouma Coulibaly	27	DR Congo
Assists	(Angola) Fanta Toure (Democratic Republic of the Congo) Diane Mabibi	7	Ivory Coast; Benin
Steals	(Ivory Coast) Kani Kouyate	7	Benin
Blocks	(Democratic Republic of the Congo) Ginette Makiese	3	Ivory Coast
2-point field goal percentage	(Mali) Minata Keita	85.7% (6/7)	Angola
3-point field goal percentage	(Mali) Fatoumata Bagayoko (Mali) Sira Diakité	66.7% (2/3)	DR Congo; Angola
Free throw percentage	(Democratic Republic of the Congo) Ngusu Mafuta	100% (7/7)	Ivory Coast
Turnovers	(Mali) Minata Keita	10	DR Congo

=== Team Tournament Highs ===
Points

Rank	Name	G	Pts	PPG
1	Mali	6	416	69.3
2	DR Congo	6	371	61.8
3	Ivory Coast	6	349	58.2
4	Benin	6	272	45.3
5	Angola	4	167	41.8

Rebounds

Rank	Name	G	Rbs	RPG
1	DR Congo	6	271	45.2
2	Ivory Coast	6	252	42
2	Mali	6	249	41.5
4	Angola	4	154	38.5
5	Benin	6	230	38.3

Assists

Rank	Name	G	Ast	APG
1	Mali	6	59	9.8
2	DR Congo	6	56	9.3
3	Ivory Coast	6	46	7.7
4	Benin	6	27	4.5
5	Angola	4	13	3.3

Steals

Rank	Name	G	Sts	SPG
1	Ivory Coast	6	66	11
2	Angola	4	38	9.5
2	DR Congo	6	40	6.7
4	Benin	6	39	6.5
5	Mali	6	35	5.8

Blocks

Rank	Name	G	Bks	BPG
1	DR Congo	6	26	4.3
2	Mali	6	23	3.8
3	Angola	4	4	1
4	Ivory Coast	6	5	0.8
5	Benin	6	2	0.3

Turnovers

Rank	Name	G	Tos	TPG
1	Mali	6	140	23.3
2	Benin	6	139	23.2
3	Ivory Coast	6	134	22.3
4	DR Congo	6	126	21
5	Angola	4	67	16.8

2-point field goal percentage

Pos	Name	A	M	%
1	Mali	278	149	53.6
2	DR Congo	303	121	39.9
3	Ivory Coast	311	113	36.3
4	Benin	281	82	29.2
5	Angola	180	50	27.8

3-point field goal percentage

Pos	Name	A	M	%
1	Mali	95	21	22.1
2	Ivory Coast	81	14	17.3
3	DR Congo	72	12	16.7
4	Benin	95	15	15.8
5	Angola	56	4	7.1

Free throw percentage

Pos	Name	A	M	%
1	DR Congo	171	93	54.4
2	Benin	147	63	42.9
3	Angola	129	55	42.6
4	Ivory Coast	196	81	41.3
5	Mali	138	55	39.9

=== Team Game highs ===
Department	Name	Total	Opponent
Points	DR Congo	87	Benin
Rebounds	DR Congo	63	Benin
Assists	DR Congo	15	Benin
Steals	Ivory Coast	15	Benin
Blocks	Mali	8	Ivory Coast
2-point field goal percentage	Mali	61.7% (29/47)	Benin
3-point field goal percentage	Benin	45.5% (5/11)	Mali
Free throw percentage	DR Congo	62.5% (10/16)	Ivory Coast
Turnovers	Ivory Coast	35	Angola

== See also ==
- 2007 FIBA Africa Championship for Women
