= 2006 FIBA Africa Under-18 Championship for Women squads =

2006 FIBA Africa U-18 Championship for Women squads

This article displays the rosters for the participating teams at the 2006 FIBA Africa Under-18 Championship for Women.

== Angola ==
Angola women's national U18 basketball team – 2006 FIBA Africa Championship – 5th place roster
Players
Coaches

Pos.	No.	Name	Age – Date of birth	Height	Club	Ctr.
	4	Fineza Eusébio	16 – 18 July 1990		Primeiro de Agosto	(Angola)
	5	Catarina Eusébio	18 – 11 September 1988
	6	Elsa Eduardo	17 – 23 July 1989
	7	Eugénia Bento	18 – 28 February 1988
	8	Esperança António	17 – 25 November 1988
	9	Joana Baptista	18 – 30 March 1988
	10	Felícia Silva	18 – 5 January 1988
	12	Cláudia Dundão	16 – 18 April 1990
	13	Quilosa Carvalho	18 – 31 January 1988
C	14	Angelina Golome	18 – 23 March 1988	1.90 m (6 ft 3 in)
	15	Madalena Felix	16 – 20 September 1989

Head coach

- (Angola) Higino Garcia

Assistant coach

Legend

- (C) Team captain
- nat field describes country

== Benin ==
Benin women's national U18 basketball team – 2006 FIBA Africa Championship – 4th place roster
Players
Coaches

Pos.	No.	Name	Age – Date of birth	Height	Club	Ctr.
	4	Mitchorè Kouagou	17 – 5 June 1989
	5	Kèfilath Inoussa	18 – 24 March 1988
	6	Machiatou Ladani	18 – 19 January 1988
	7	Todégbé Oke	16 – 8 September 1990
	8	Naïmatou Ogbogodo	17 – 8 June 1989
	9	Emmanuelle Klouste	17 – 25 December 1988
	10	Marcelle Sousa	17 – 31 January 1989
	11	Sandrine Adomou	16 – 22 September 1989
	12	Ghislaine Zossou	17 – 29 June 1989
	13	Amidath Bouraïma	17 – 22 October 1988
	14	Adékpédjou Babalola	16 – 29 September 1989
	15	Moussiliatou Kondoh	16 – 30 September 1989

Head coach

Assistant coach

Legend

- (C) Team captain
- Club field describes current club

== (Democratic Republic of the Congo) DR Congo ==
DR Congo women's national U18 basketball team – 2006 FIBA Africa Championship – Bronze Medal roster
Players
Coaches

Pos.	No.	Name	Age – Date of birth	Height	Club	Ctr.
	4	Cele Mianda	15 – 21 October 1990
	5	Aurore Awine	18 – 14 July 1988
	6	Mujingila Mukendi	18 – 19 May 1988
F	7	Diane Mabibi	17 – 28 November 1988	1.77 m (5 ft 10 in)
	8	Mireille Butayi	18 – 26 May 1988
	9	Floris Tshilombo	16 – 25 January 1990
	10	Blandine Waki	18 – 21 April 1988
	11	Nadine Mikemo	17 – 31 October 1988
	12	Thérèse Bakenga	16 – 15 May 1990
	13	Ginette Makiese	18 – 20 April 1988
C	14	Mireille Tshiyoyo	17 – 25 November 1988	1.84 m (6 ft 0 in)
	15	Ngusu Mafuta	17 – 23 February 1989

Head coach

Assistant coach

Legend

- (C) Team captain
- Club field describes current club

== Ivory Coast ==
Ivory Coast women's national U18 basketball team – 2006 FIBA Africa Championship – Silver Medal roster
Players
Coaches

Pos.	No.	Name	Age – Date of birth	Height	Club	Ctr.
	4	Ahissa Kassi	15 – 2 December 1990
	5	Maïmounatou Kolga	14 – 7 April 1992
	6	Souko Thiam	18 – 4 March 1988
G	7	Assétou Kolga	18 – 24 April 1988	1.70 m (5 ft 7 in)	CS d'Abidjan	(Ivory Coast)
	8	Kani Kouyaté	16 – 8 August 1990
	9	Salimata Berte	17 – 7 May 1989
	10	Awa Kone	18 – 21 March 1988
	11	Mariama Kouyate	18 – 16 June 1988
	12	Awa Kamagate	17 – 1 January 1989
	13	Aminata Doumbia	18 – 1 January 1988
	14	Eineille-Té Mouke	17 – 3 December 1988
	15	Edjime Djedjemel	17 – 29 October 1988

Head coach

Assistant coach

Legend

- (C) Team captain
- Club field describes current club

== Mali ==
Mali women's national U18 basketball team – 2006 FIBA Africa Championship – Gold Medal roster
Players
Coaches

Pos.	No.	Name	Age – Date of birth	Height	Club	Ctr.
	4	Nassira Traoré	17 – 28 October 1988	1.81 m (5 ft 11 in)
	5	Kadia Sacko	18 – 25 April 1988
	6	Kadiatou Coulibaly	16 – 5 April 1990
	7	Kama Dembélé	17 – 8 October 1988
	8	Ouleymatou Coulibaly	16 – 15 July 1990
	9	Fatoumata Bagayoko	18 – 23 May 1988	1.70 m (5 ft 7 in)
	10	Fanta Toure	17 – 18 February 1989
	11	Minata Keita	17 – 15 March 1989
	12	Fatoumata Traoré	16 – 10 June 1990
	13	Aïssata Bore	17 – 12 June 1989
	14	Sira Diakité	17 – 16 February 1989
	15	Naignouma Coulibaly	17 – 31 May 1989	1.92 m (6 ft 4 in)

Head coach

Assistant coach

Legend

- (C) Team captain
- Club field describes current club

== See also ==
- 2009 FIBA Africa Championship for Women squads
