= 2008 FIBA Africa Women's Clubs Champions Cup =

2008 FIBA Africa Champions Cup for Women
14th FIBA Africa Champions Cup for Women

Tournament details
- Host country: Kenya
- Dates: November 18 – 29
- Teams: 12 (from 53 federations)
- Venue: 1 (in 1 host city)

Final positions
- Champions: Mozambique (Desp de Maputo's 2nd title; Mozambique's 4th title)

Tournament statistics
- MVP: (Mozambique) Deolinda Ngulela
- Top scorer: (Democratic Republic of the Congo) Kalundu 21.3
- Top rebounds: (Kenya) Achieng 7.7
- Top assists: (Mozambique) Ngulela 6
- PPG (Team): (Mozambique) Desportivo 78.9
- RPG (Team): (Mozambique) Desportivo 21
- APG (Team): (Mozambique) Desportivo 17.4

Official website
- 2008 FIBA Africa Women's Clubs Champions Cup

The 2008 FIBA Africa Women's Clubs Champions Cup (14th edition), was an international basketball tournament held in Nairobi, Kenya, from November 20 to 29, 2008. The tournament, organized by FIBA Africa and hosted by Kenya Ports Authority, was contested by 12 clubs split into 2 groups of 6, the first four of which qualifying for the knock-out stage.

The tournament was won by Desportivo de Maputo from Mozambique.

== Draw ==
Group A	Group B
(Ivory Coast) Abidjan Basket Club (Mali) Djoliba (Kenya) Eagle Wings (Nigeria) First Bank (Angola) Primeiro de Agosto (Democratic Republic of the Congo) Radi	(Rwanda) APR (Ivory Coast) Club Sportif d'Abidjan (Mozambique) Desportivo de Maputo (Uganda) KCCA Leopards; Kenya Ports Authority (Democratic Republic of the Congo) Vita Club

== Preliminary rounds ==
Times given below are in UTC+3.

=== Group A ===
Qualified for the quarter-finals

	Group A	M	W	L	PF	PA	Diff	P
1.	(Angola) Primeiro de Agosto	5	5	0	410	271	+139	10
2.	(Nigeria) First Bank	5	4	1	354	297	+57	9
3.	(Ivory Coast) Abidjan Basket Club	5	2	3	307	284	+23	7
4.	(Mali) Djoliba	5	1	4	317	360	-43	6
5.	(Democratic Republic of the Congo) Radi	5	1	4	319	357	−38	6
6.	(Kenya) Eagle Wings	5	0	5	275	413	−138	5

20 November 2008
18:00

Boxscore

Abidjan BC (Ivory Coast)	66–53	(Kenya) Eagle Wings
Scoring by quarter: 18-15, 18-15, 20-10, 10-13
Pts: Abbady, Camara 12; Rebs: Abbady 5 Asts: Diomande 3		Pts: Achieng 12; Rebs: Achieng 9 Asts: Okoth 2

Nyayo National Stadium Gymnasium, Nairobi

20 November 2008
20:00

Boxscore

1º de Agosto (Angola)	63–58	(Nigeria) First Bank
Scoring by quarter: 17-14, 23-16, 12-19, 11-9
Pts: Domitila 17; Rebs: Sónia 4 Asts: three players 2		Pts: Ojelabi 15; Rebs: Udoka 4 Asts: Ekworomadu 2

Nyayo National Stadium Gymnasium, Nairobi

23 November 2008
11:00

Boxscore

Radi (Democratic Republic of the Congo)	71–72	(Mali) Djoliba
Scoring by quarter: 12-21, 23-22, 15-15, 21-14
Pts: n/a Rebs: n/a		Pts: n/a Rebs: n/a

Nyayo National Stadium Gymnasium, Nairobi

21 November 2008
14:00

Boxscore

Radi (Democratic Republic of the Congo)	53–75	(Angola) 1º de Agosto
Scoring by quarter: 15-17, 13-20, 8-19, 17-19
Pts: Nyota 20; Rebs: Nyota 9 Asts: Lukokesha 2		Pts: Sónia 19; Rebs: Astrida, L.Tomás 5 Asts: three players 3

Nyayo National Stadium Gymnasium, Nairobi

21 November 2008
18:00

Boxscore

Eagle Wings (Kenya)	60–82	(Mali) Djoliba
Scoring by quarter: 13-22, 10-18, 22-20, 15-22
Pts: Nyongesa 12; Rebs: Achieng 5 Asts: Achieng, Juma 2		Pts: Mbengue 25; Rebs: Daou 7 Asts: Mbengue 4

Nyayo National Stadium Gymnasium, Nairobi

21 November 2008
20:00

Boxscore

Abidjan BC (Ivory Coast)	50–57	(Nigeria) First Bank
Scoring by quarter: 6-16, 13-5, 15-21, 16-15
Pts: Berte 13; Rebs: Abbady 7 Asts: Camara, Gbane 2		Pts: Ekworomadu 15; Rebs: Udoka 11; Asts: Adibeli 4

Nyayo National Stadium Gymnasium, Nairobi

22 November 2008
12:00

Boxscore

Abidjan BC (Ivory Coast)	73–57	(Democratic Republic of the Congo) Radi
Scoring by quarter: 14-12, 22-18, 25-8, 12-19
Pts: Camara 24; Rebs: Camara, Mbaye 8 Asts: Berte 6		Pts: Nyoka 20; Rebs: Nyota 11; Asts: Nyoka 3

Nyayo National Stadium Gymnasium, Nairobi

22 November 2008
18:00

Boxscore

First Bank (Nigeria)	94–75	(Kenya) Eagle Wings
Scoring by quarter: 20-24, 22-14, 26-10, 26-27
Pts: Nzekwe 30; Rebs: Udeaja, Bhadmus 6 Asts: Beybeyah 3		Pts: Achieng 29; Rebs: Achieng 13; Asts: Nyikuli 5

Nyayo National Stadium Gymnasium, Nairobi

22 November 2008
20:00

Boxscore

Djoliba (Mali)	58–100	(Angola) 1º de Agosto
Scoring by quarter: 24-19, 15-28, 9-27, 10-26
Pts: N.Traore, Seremé 10; Rebs: Daou 10; Asts: Adja Ba 4		Pts: Nacissela, Sónia 21; Rebs: Jaquelina, Crispina 5 Asts: I.Francisco 4

Nyayo National Stadium Gymnasium, Nairobi

24 November 2008
14:00

Boxscore

First Bank (Nigeria)	76–66	(Democratic Republic of the Congo) Radi
Scoring by quarter: 18-9, 18-14, 19-20, 21-23
Pts: Udeaja 20; Rebs: Udeaja 9 Asts: Nzekwe 4		Pts: Kalundu 16; Rebs: Nyota 8 Asts: three players 3

Nyayo National Stadium Gymnasium, Nairobi

24 November 2008
18:00

Boxscore

Eagle Wings (Kenya)	44–99	(Angola) 1º de Agosto
Scoring by quarter: 12-23, 8-33, 12-26, 12-17
Pts: Achieng 15; Rebs: Achieng 14; Asts: Mburu, Ouma 3		Pts: Nacissela 21; Rebs: L.Tomás 6 Asts: Domitila 5

Nyayo National Stadium Gymnasium, Nairobi

24 November 2008
20:00

Boxscore

Djoliba (Mali)	44–60	(Ivory Coast) Abidjan BC
Scoring by quarter: 8-18, 13-13, 15-16, 8-13
Pts: N.Traore 11; Rebs: M.Traore 11; Asts: Adja Ba 3		Pts: Camara 20; Rebs: Camara, Mbaye 6 Asts: Berte 5

Nyayo National Stadium Gymnasium, Nairobi

25 November 2008
16:00

Boxscore

First Bank (Nigeria)	69–61	(Mali) Djoliba
Scoring by quarter: 19-22, 11-13, 19-17, 20-9
Pts: Ekworomadu 19; Rebs: Dawdu 7 Asts: Ojelabi, Angwe 2		Pts: M.Traore 18; Rebs: M.Traore 10; Asts: Seremé 4

Nyayo National Stadium Gymnasium, Nairobi

25 November 2008
18:00

Boxscore

Eagle Wings (Kenya)	61–72	(Democratic Republic of the Congo) Radi
Scoring by quarter: 18-14, 15-20, 15-12, 13-26
Pts: Achieng 21; Rebs: Achieng 10; Asts: Achieng 7		Pts: Kalundu 25; Rebs: Kalundu 8 Asts: Masiala 3

Nyayo National Stadium Gymnasium, Nairobi

25 November 2008
20:00

Boxscore

1º de Agosto (Ivory Coast)	73–58	(Angola) Abidjan BC
Scoring by quarter: 15-17, 22-11, 20-15, 16-15
Pts: Astrida 29; Rebs: L.Tomás 6 Asts: Domitila, Ângela 2		Pts: Berte 16; Rebs: Abbady 8 Asts: four players 1

Nyayo National Stadium Gymnasium, Nairobi

=== Group B ===
Qualified for the quarter-finals

	Group B	M	W	L	PF	PA	Diff	P
1.	(Mozambique) Desportivo de Maputo	5	5	0	435	245	+190	10
2.	(Ivory Coast) Club Sportif d'Abidjan	5	4	1	350	282	+68	9
3.	Kenya Ports Authority	5	3	2	276	263	+13	8
4.	(Rwanda) APR	5	2	3	290	332	-42	7
5.	(Democratic Republic of the Congo) Vita Club	5	1	4	248	338	-90	6
6.	(Uganda) KCCA Leopards	5	0	5	259	398	-139	5

20 November 2008
14:00

Boxscore

Vita Club (Democratic Republic of the Congo)	41–85	(Mozambique) Desp Maputo
Scoring by quarter: 12-9, 5-23, 11-23, 13-30
Pts: Tshiniangu 21; Rebs: Amba 8 Asts: Bakayukila 2		Pts: S.Sy 20; Rebs: Aleia 8 Asts: Ngulela, Valerdina 6

Nyayo National Stadium Gymnasium, Nairobi

20 November 2008
16:00

Boxscore

KPA (Kenya)	44–43	(Rwanda) APR
Scoring by quarter: 17-5, 7-14, 14-13, 6-11
Pts: Odhiambo, Olang 10; Rebs: Memba 10; Asts: three players 2		Pts: Muleka 13; Rebs: Auma 10; Asts: Ndangi 4

Nyayo National Stadium Gymnasium, Nairobi

23 November 2008
09:00

Boxscore

KCCA Leopards (Uganda)	43–78	(Ivory Coast) CS d'Abidjan
Scoring by quarter: 12-15, 7-20, 16-21, 8-22
Pts: Akullo 12; Rebs: Hamala 5 Asts: Akullo 3		Pts: K.Kouyate 17; Rebs: Djedjemel 5 Asts: A.Kolga 6

Nyayo National Stadium Gymnasium, Nairobi

21 November 2008
10:00

Boxscore

Desp Maputo (Mozambique)	88–41	(Rwanda) APR
Scoring by quarter: 19-12, 17-11, 26-7, 26-11
Pts: Tânia 19; Rebs: S.Sy 5 Asts: Tânia 5		Pts: Muleka 13; Rebs: Ndangi, Imanishimwe 4 Asts: Muleka 5

Nyayo National Stadium Gymnasium, Nairobi

21 November 2008
12:00

Boxscore

Vita Club (Democratic Republic of the Congo)	40–70	(Ivory Coast) CS d'Abidjan
Scoring by quarter: 9-15, 11-13, 12-20, 8-22
Pts: Tshiniangu 14; Rebs: Tshiniangu 6 Asts: Ngono, Mosanza 2		Pts: Kouyate 19; Rebs: Djedjemel 8 Asts: M.Kolga

Nyayo National Stadium Gymnasium, Nairobi

21 November 2008
16:00

Boxscore

KPA (Kenya)	73–41	(Uganda) KCCA Leopards
Scoring by quarter: 18-13, 15-4, 21-19, 19-5
Pts: Odhiambo 14; Rebs: Odhiambo 5 Asts: Odhiambo, Olang 4		Pts: Akullo, Sabano 9 Rebs: Akullo, Nakiwu 4 Asts: Akullo 2

Nyayo National Stadium Gymnasium, Nairobi

22 November 2008
10:00

Boxscore

APR (Rwanda)	81–61	(Uganda) KCCA Leopards
Scoring by quarter: 11-13, 12-18, 25-11, 33-19
Pts: Muhongerwa 30; Rebs: Auma 4 Asts: Muhongerwa 2		Pts: Nakiwu 14; Rebs: Hamala 7 Asts: five players 1

Nyayo National Stadium Gymnasium, Nairobi

22 November 2008
14:00

Boxscore

Vita Club (Democratic Republic of the Congo)	49–57	(Kenya) KPA
Scoring by quarter: 11-16, 11-14, 8-11, 19-16
Pts: Bakayukila 19; Rebs: Tshiniangu 10; Asts: Tshiniangu 4		Pts: Odhiambo 17; Rebs: Memba 15; Asts: Makau 4

Nyayo National Stadium Gymnasium, Nairobi

22 November 2008
16:00

Boxscore

CS d'Abidjan (Ivory Coast)	57–90	(Mozambique) Desp Maputo
Scoring by quarter: 10-23, 10-21, 21-24, 16-22
Pts: K.Kouyate 18; Rebs: K.Kouyate 8 Asts: A.Kolga, M.Kouyate 4		Pts: Aleia 20; Rebs: Jones 7 Asts: Ngulela 7

Nyayo National Stadium Gymnasium, Nairobi

24 November 2008
10:00

Boxscore

Desp Maputo (Mozambique)	105–57	(Uganda) KCCA Leopards
Scoring by quarter: 35-14, 32-17, 22-10, 16-16
Pts: Dessai 23; Rebs: Jones 11; Asts: Ngulela 11		Pts: Hamala 22; Rebs: Hamala 7 Asts: Akullo 6

Nyayo National Stadium Gymnasium, Nairobi

24 November 2008
12:00

Boxscore

APR (Rwanda)	69–57	(Democratic Republic of the Congo) Vita Club
Scoring by quarter: 23-13, 17-11, 13-13, 16-20
Pts: Muleka 24; Rebs: Auma 12; Asts: Muleka 6		Pts: Tshiniangu 23; Rebs: Amba 9 Asts: Bituli 3

Nyayo National Stadium Gymnasium, Nairobi

24 November 2008
16:00

Boxscore

CS d'Abidjan (Ivory Coast)	63–53	(Kenya) KPA
Scoring by quarter: 12-16, 16-11, 13-15, 22-11
Pts: K.Kouyate 18; Rebs: M.Kouyate 6 Asts: A.Kolga 8		Pts: Odhiambo, Memba 16; Rebs: Murambi 6 Asts: Makau 5

Nyayo National Stadium Gymnasium, Nairobi

25 November 2008
10:00

Boxscore

KCCA Leopards (Uganda)	57–61	(Democratic Republic of the Congo) Vita Club
Scoring by quarter: 12-16, 15-17, 23-17, 7-11
Pts: Hamala 22; Rebs: Hamala 12; Asts: Akullo 5		Pts: Ngono 24; Rebs: Manteka 12; Asts: Bakayukila, Mosanza 2

Nyayo National Stadium Gymnasium, Nairobi

25 November 2008
12:00

Boxscore

Desp Maputo (Mozambique)	67–49	(Kenya) KPA
Scoring by quarter: 16-15, 13-8, 22-13, 16-13
Pts: Ngulela 20; Rebs: S.Sy 8 Asts: Dessai 5		Pts: Memba 16; Rebs: Memba 10; Asts: Aratoh 3

Nyayo National Stadium Gymnasium, Nairobi

25 November 2008
14:00

Boxscore

CSA (Ivory Coast)	82–56	(Rwanda) APR
Scoring by quarter: 23-18, 14-3, 20-18, 25-17
Pts: three players 16; Rebs: K.Kouyate 9 Asts: A.Kolga 2		Pts: Muleka 17; Rebs: Auma 6 Asts: four players 1

Nyayo National Stadium Gymnasium, Nairobi

== Knockout stage ==
9th-12th Place
November 28
(Kenya) Eagle Wings	49
(Democratic Republic of the Congo) Vita Club	37
November 28
(Democratic Republic of the Congo) Radi	93
(Uganda) KCCA Leopards	60

9th place
November 29
(Kenya) Eagle Wings	55
(Democratic Republic of the Congo) Radi	75
11th place
November 29
(Democratic Republic of the Congo) Vita Club	63
(Uganda) KCCA Leopards	55

Quarter-finals
November 27
(Ivory Coast) Abidjan BC	52
(Ivory Coast) CS d'Abidjan	46
November 27
(Rwanda) APR	57
(Angola) 1º de Agosto	81
November 27
(Kenya) KPA	44
(Nigeria) First Bank	51
November 27
(Mali) Djoliba	63
(Mozambique) Desp Maputo	71

5th-8th Place
November 28
(Ivory Coast) CS d'Abidjan	74
(Rwanda) APR	58
November 28
(Kenya) KPA	63
(Mali) Djoliba	88

5th place
November 29
(Ivory Coast) CS d'Abidjan	59
(Mali) Djoliba	57
7th place
November 29
(Kenya) KPA	50
(Rwanda) APR	67

Quarter-finals
November 27
(Rwanda) APR	57
(Angola) 1º de Agosto	81
November 27
(Ivory Coast) Abidjan BC	52
(Ivory Coast) CS d'Abidjan	46
November 27
(Mali) Djoliba	63
(Mozambique) Desp Maputo	71
November 27
(Kenya) KPA	44
(Nigeria) First Bank	51

Semi-finals
November 28
(Angola) 1º de Agosto	58
(Ivory Coast) Abidjan BC	49
November 28
(Mozambique) Desp Maputo	67
(Nigeria) First Bank	55

Final
November 29
(Angola) 1º de Agosto	63
(Angola) Desp Maputo	70
Third place
November 29
(Ivory Coast) Abidjan BC	62
(Nigeria) First Bank	76

=== 9th-12th place ===
27 November 2008
10:00

Boxscore

KCCA (Uganda)	60–93	(Democratic Republic of the Congo) Radi
Scoring by quarter: 16-21, 10-27, 16-27, 18-18
Pts: Akullo 25; Rebs: Kalundu 17; Asts: Nyoka 6		Pts: Kalundu 30; Rebs: Peace 8 Asts: Siima 3

Nyayo National Stadium Gymnasium, Nairobi

27 November 2008
12:00

Boxscore

Eagle Wings (Kenya)	49–37	(Democratic Republic of the Congo) Vita Club
Scoring by quarter: 13-12, 14-12, 10-6, 12-7
Pts: Nyongesa 12; Rebs: Achieng 14; Asts: Nyikuli 5		Pts: Tshiniangu 18; Rebs: Tshiniangu 12; Asts: Manteka 3

Nyayo National Stadium Gymnasium, Nairobi

=== Quarter-finals ===
27 November 2008
14:00

Boxscore

APR (Rwanda)	54–81	(Angola) 1º de Agosto
Scoring by quarter: 15-30, 13-19, 11-19, 15-13
Pts: Auma 13; Rebs: Auma 8 Asts: Muleka, Ndangi 3		Pts: Astrida 18; Rebs: three players 5 Asts: Domitila 7

Nyayo National Stadium Gymnasium, Nairobi

27 November 2008
16:00

Boxscore

Djoliba (Mali)	63–79	(Mozambique) Desp Maputo
Scoring by quarter: 16-19, 15-21, 17-17, 15-22
Pts: Mbengue 19; Rebs: Mariko 11; Asts: Adja Ba 4		Pts: S.Sy, Ngulela 13; Rebs: Jones, Aleia 7 Asts: Dessai 4

Nyayo National Stadium Gymnasium, Nairobi

27 November 2008
18:00

Boxscore

KPA (Kenya)	44–51	(Nigeria) First Bank
Scoring by quarter: 14-8, 9-15, 8-20, 13-8
Pts: Aratoh 15; Rebs: Aratoh, Anyango 7 Asts: Odhiambo 3		Pts: Ekworomadu 16; Rebs: Udeaja 9 Asts: Ojelabi 3

Nyayo National Stadium Gymnasium, Nairobi

27 November 2008
20:00

Boxscore

Abidjan BC (Ivory Coast)	52–46	(Ivory Coast) CS d'Abidjan
Scoring by quarter: 16-16, 14-7, 12-9, 10-14
Pts: Camara 15; Rebs: Mbaye 10; Asts: Benga, Diomande 3		Pts: K.Kouyate 19; Rebs: A.Kolga 5 Asts: Fofana 2

Nyayo National Stadium Gymnasium, Nairobi

=== 11th place ===
28 November 2008
10:00

Boxscore

KCCA Leopards (Uganda)	55–63	(Democratic Republic of the Congo) Vita Club
Scoring by quarter: 15-16, 9-13, 21-14, 10-20
Pts: Akullo 24; Rebs: Akullo 9 Asts: Akullo 2		Pts: Tshiniangu 22; Rebs: Tshiniangu 12; Asts: Ngono 3

Nyayo National Stadium Gymnasium, Nairobi

=== 9th place ===
28 November 2008
12:00

Boxscore Boxscore

Radi (Democratic Republic of the Congo)	75–55	(Kenya) Eagle Wings
Scoring by quarter: 20-14, 21-14, 16-17, 18-10
Pts: Kalundu 23; Rebs: Kalundu 6 Asts: Mianda 5		Pts: Ouma 17; Rebs: Achieng 11; Asts: Ouma, Achieng 3

Nyayo National Stadium Gymnasium, Nairobi

=== 5th-8th place ===
28 November 2008
14:00

Boxscore

APR (Rwanda)	58–74	(Ivory Coast) CSA
Scoring by quarter: 20-12, 15-18, 15-26, 8-18
Pts: Auma 16; Rebs: Auma, Ndangi 7 Asts: Muhongerwa 3		Pts: K.Kouyate, Djedjemel 16; Rebs: Djedjemel, M.Kouyate 6 Asts: K.Kouyate, Animan 2

Nyayo National Stadium Gymnasium, Nairobi

28 November 2008
16:00

Boxscore

Djoliba (Mali)	88–63	(Kenya) KPA
Scoring by quarter: 23-15, 18-22, 22-9, 25-17
Pts: Mbengue 29; Rebs: Daou 15; Asts: Daou, Adja Ba 3		Pts: Memba 11; Rebs: Juma 6 Asts: three players 2

Nyayo National Stadium Gymnasium, Nairobi

=== Semifinals ===
28 November 2008
18:00

Boxscore

Desp Maputo (Mozambique)	67–55	(Nigeria) First Bank
Scoring by quarter: 21-14, 16-12, 10-18, 20-11
Pts: Ngulela 16; Rebs: S.Sy 9 Asts: Ngulela 11		Pts: Udoka 14; Rebs: Udeaja 9 Asts: Udoka 4

Nyayo National Stadium Gymnasium, Nairobi

28 November 2008
20:00

Boxscore

1º de Agosto (Angola)	68–49	(Ivory Coast) Abidjan BC
Scoring by quarter: 18-13, 24-7, 12-14, 14-15
Pts: Astrida 19; Rebs: Nacissela 6 Asts: Domitila 5		Pts: Diomande 16; Rebs: Abbady 5 Asts: Diomande 4

Nyayo National Stadium Gymnasium, Nairobi

=== 7th place ===
29 November 2008
09:00

Boxscore

APR (Rwanda)	67–50	(Kenya) KPA
Scoring by quarter: 16-11, 14-13, 21-15, 16-11
Pts: Muleka, Muhongerwa 20; Rebs: Ndangi 11; Asts: Muleka, Ndangi 5		Pts: Aratoh 26; Rebs: Anyango 6 Asts: Murambi 3

Nyayo National Stadium Gymnasium, Nairobi

=== 5th place ===
29 November 2008
11:00

Boxscore

CS d'Abidjan (Ivory Coast)	59–57	(Mali) Djoliba
Scoring by quarter: 8-11, 13-14, 24-16, 14-16
Pts: M.Kouyate 17; Rebs: Fofana 5 Asts: K.Kouyate 2		Pts: N.Traore 20; Rebs: Daou 9 Asts: three players 2

Nyayo National Stadium Gymnasium, Nairobi

=== Bronze medal game ===
29 November 2008
13:00

Boxscore

First Bank (Nigeria)	76–62	(Ivory Coast) Abidjan BC
Scoring by quarter: 24-13, 12-12, 23-18, 17-19
Pts: Udoka 17; Rebs: Udoka 8 Asts: Adibeli 3		Pts: Camara 19; Rebs: Abbady 7 Asts: Diomande 2

Nyayo National Stadium Gymnasium, Nairobi

=== Gold medal game ===
29 November 2008
15:00

Boxscore

Desp Maputo (Mozambique)	70–63	(Angola) 1º de Agosto
Scoring by quarter: 18–10, 11–16, 26–17, 15–20
Pts: Jones 27; Rebs: Jones 15; Asts: Jones 3		Pts: Astrida 19; Rebs: Nacissela 7 Asts: I.Francisco 3

Nyayo National Stadium Gymnasium, Nairobi

== Final standings ==
Rank	Team	Record
Gold medal	(Mozambique) Desportivo de Maputo	8–0
Silver medal	(Angola) Primeiro de Agosto	7–1
Bronze medal	(Nigeria) First Bank	6–2
4	(Ivory Coast) Abidjan Basket Club	4–4
5	(Ivory Coast) Club Sportif d'Abidjan	6–2
6	(Mali) Djoliba AC	2–6
7	(Rwanda) APR	3–5
8	Kenya Ports Authority	3–5
9	(Democratic Republic of the Congo) Radi	3–4
10	(Kenya) Eagle Wings	1–6
11	(Democratic Republic of the Congo) Vita Club	2–5
12	(Uganda) KCCA Leopards	0–7

1st	2nd	3rd
(Mozambique) Desportivo de Maputo (Mozambique) Aleia Rachide (Mozambique) Anabela Cossa (Mozambique) Cátia Halar (Mozambique) Deolinda Ngulela (Mozambique) Diara Dessai (Mozambique) Filomena Micato (Mozambique) Leia Dongue (Mozambique) Odélia Mafanela (Senegal) Sokhna Sy (Mozambique) Tânia Wachena (Mozambique) Valerdina Manhonga (United States) Yolanda Jones; Coach: (Mozambique) Nazir Salé	(Angola) Primeiro de Agosto (Angola) Ângela Cardoso (Angola) Astrida Vicente (Democratic Republic of the Congo) Bokomba Masela (Cape Verde) Crispina Correia (Angola) Domitila Ventura (Angola) Fineza Eusébio (Angola) Isabel Francisco (Angola) Jaquelina Francisco (Angola) Luísa Tomás (Angola) Nacissela Maurício (Angola) Sofia Capinga (Angola) Sónia Guadalupe; Coach: (Angola) Higino Garcia	(Nigeria) First Bank (Nigeria) Adenike Dawdu (Nigeria) Bintu Bhadmus (Nigeria) Catherine Nzekwe (Nigeria) Erdoo Angwe (Nigeria) Ezinne James (Nigeria) Funmilayo Ojelabi (Nigeria) Joyce Ekworomadu (Nigeria) Mfon Udoka (Nigeria) Nwamaka Adibeli (Nigeria) Priscilla Udeaja (Nigeria) Sandra German (Nigeria) Viola Beybeyah; Coach: (Nigeria) A. Aderemi

== All Tournament Team ==
G	(Mozambique) Deolinda Ngulela
F	(Nigeria) Joyce Ekworomadu
F	(Angola) Nacissela Maurício
C	(Ivory Coast) Fatoumata Camara
C	(Puerto Rico) (United States) Yolanda Jones

2008 FIBA Africa Women's Clubs Champions Cup

Grupo Desportivo de Maputo
2nd title

Most Valuable Player
(Mozambique) Deolinda Ngulela

== See also ==
- 2009 FIBA Africa Championship for Women
