= Angola women's national under-20 basketball team =

Angola
- Joined FIBA: 1979
- FIBA zone: FIBA Africa
- National federation: FAB Portuguese: Federação Angolana de Basquetebol

FIBA World Cup
- Appearances: 0
- Medals: None

FIBA Africa Under-20 Championship for Women
- Appearances: 2
- Medals: (0)
Away

The Angola women's national basketball team Under-20 represented Angola in international basketball competitions and is controlled by the Federação Angolana de Basquetebol. At continental level, it competed at the FIBA Africa Under-20 Championship for Women which was eligible for the FIBA Under-21 World Championship for Women. Angola has been a member of FIBA since 1979.

== Current roster ==
n/a

== Head coach position ==
- n/a

== FIBA Under-17 World Championship for Women record ==
- 2007 FIBA Under-21 World Championship for Women: Not Qualified
- 2005 FIBA Under-21 World Championship for Women: Not Qualified

== African Championship for Women record ==
- Maputo 2006 : 5th
- Tunis 2002 : 4th

== Past rosters ==
Angola women's national U20 basketball team - 2006 FIBA Africa Championship – 5th place roster
Players
Coaches

Pos.	No.	Name	Age – Date of birth	Height	Club	Ctr.
	4	Eva Silva	19 – 22 December 1986	0 m (0 in)
	5	Catarina Eusébio	18 – 11 September 1988	0 m (0 in)	Primeiro de Agosto	(Angola)
G	6	Fineza Eusébio	16 – 18 July 1990	0 m (0 in)	Primeiro de Agosto	(Angola)
	7	Marisa Nsiame	20 – 9 September 1986	0 m (0 in)
	8	Madalena Felix	17 – 20 September 1989	0 m (0 in)	Primeiro de Agosto	(Angola)
	9	Samba Eduardo	19 – 26 January 1987	0 m (0 in)
	10	Yara Santos	20 – 6 March 1986	0 m (0 in)
	11	Etelvina Cristiano	19 – 7 November 1987	0 m (0 in)
	12	Vera Miguel	20 – 17 April 1986	0 m (0 in)
F	13	Nadir Manuel	20 – 30 November 1986	1.85 m (6 ft 1 in)
C	14	Angelina Golome	18 – 23 March 1988	1.90 m (6 ft 3 in)	Interclube	(Angola)
	15	Cláudia António	20 – 27 May 1986	0 m (0 in)

Head coach

- (Angola) Aníbal Moreira

Assistant coach

- (Angola) André Manuel

Legend

- (C) Team captain
- Club field describes current club

Angola women's national U20 basketball team - 2002 FIBA Africa Championship – 4th place roster
Players
Coaches

Pos.	No.	Name	Age – Date of birth	Height	Club	Ctr.
		Adelina Eduardo	–	0 m (0 in)	Desp Maculusso	(Angola)
SF		Ngiendula Filipe	20 – 20 May 1982	1.78 m (5 ft 10 in)	Desp Maculusso	(Angola)
		Marinela dos Santos	–	0 m (0 in)	Desp Maculusso	(Angola)
		Eva Cruz	–	0 m (0 in)	Desp Maculusso	(Angola)
		Madalena Muhongo	–	0 m (0 in)	Desp Maculusso	(Angola)
PF		Sónia Guadalupe	17 – 15 September 1985	1.88 m (6 ft 2 in)	Primeiro de Agosto	(Angola)
C		Luísa Tomás	19 – 24 March 1983	1.93 m (6 ft 4 in)	Primeiro de Agosto	(Angola)
		Nádia Guimarães	–	0 m (0 in)	Primeiro de Agosto	(Angola)
		Claudete Paixão	–	0 m (0 in)	Interclube	(Angola)
		Neusa Afonso	–	0 m (0 in)	Interclube	(Angola)
		Clemencia Mbunga	–	0 m (0 in)	Desp Nocal	(Angola)
		Leocádia Gonçalves	–	0 m (0 in)	1º de Maio	(Angola)

Head coach

- (Angola) Alexandre Neto

Assistant coach

Legend

- (C) Team captain
- Club field describes current club

== Former managers ==
- 2002 Alexandre Neto
- 2006 Aníbal Moreira

== See also ==
- Angola women's national basketball team
- Angola women's national basketball team Under-18
- Angola women's national basketball team Under-16
