= 2006 FIBA Africa Under-20 Championship for Women =

2006 FIBA Africa U-20 Championship for Women
2nd FIBA Africa Under-20 Championship for Women

Tournament details
- Host country: Mozambique
- Dates: December 2–9, 2006
- Teams: 5 (from 1 confederation)
- Venue: 1 (in 1 host city)

Final positions
- Champions: Mali (1st title)

Tournament statistics
- MVP: (Mozambique) Anabela Cossa
- Top scorer: (Senegal) Sarr 13.7
- Top rebounds: (Mali) Coulibaly 13.3
- Top assists: (Mozambique) Anabela Cossa 3.8
- PPG (Team): Senegal 62.8
- RPG (Team): Angola 46.5
- APG (Team): Mozambique 10.8

Official website
- 2006 FIBA Africa U-20 Championship for Women

The 2006 FIBA Africa Under-20 Championship for Women was the second and last FIBA Africa Under-20 Championship for Women, played under the rules of FIBA, the world governing body for basketball, and the FIBA Africa thereof. The tournament was hosted by Mozambique from December 2 to 9 2006, with the games played at the Pavilhão do Maxaquene in Maputo.

Mali defeated Mozambique 49–47 in the final to win their first title. and securing a spot at the 2007 U-21 Women's World Cup.

== Participants ==
- Angola
- Mali
- Mozambique
- Senegal
- South Africa

== Preliminary round ==
Times given below are in UTC+2.

December 2
18:00

Boxscore

Senegal	45–46	Angola
Scoring by quarter: 21-10, 4-13, 9-7, 11-16
Pts: Sène 18; Rebs: Sarr 14; Asts: Diata 3		Pts: C.Eusébio 16; Rebs: Nadir 10; Asts: C.Eusébio 3

Pavilhão do Maxaquene, Maputo

December 2
20:45

Boxscore

Mozambique	55–49	South Africa
Scoring by quarter: 20-9, 12-11, 17-9, 6-20
Pts: A.Cossa 15; Rebs: Nádia 10; Asts: A.Cossa 5		Pts: Ngcongo 9 Rebs: Mocholo 7 Asts: Moutlwatse 4

Pavilhão do Maxaquene, Maputo

December 3
18:30

Boxscore

Mali	57–49	Angola
Scoring by quarter: 20-19, 13-7, 12-7, 12-16
Pts: Bagayoko 16; Rebs: N.Coulibaly 11; Asts: M.Traore 3		Pts: C.Eusébio 12; Rebs: Nadir 11; Asts: Madalena 2

Pavilhão do Maxaquene, Maputo

December 3
20:45

Boxscore

Mozambique	58–55	Senegal
Scoring by quarter: 17-16, 12-8, 16-24, 13-7
Pts: Gimo 19; Rebs: Gimo, Mafanela 8 Asts: A.Cossa 4		Pts: Sène, S.Sy 14; Rebs: Diata 10; Asts: Sène 4

Pavilhão do Maxaquene, Maputo

December 4
18:30

Boxscore

South Africa	30–74	Senegal
Scoring by quarter: 5-29, 12-11, 11-19, 2-15
Pts: Moutlwatse 14; Rebs: Johnson, Mabuya 6 Asts: Johnson 2		Pts: Diata, Sarr 15; Rebs: Sarr 11; Asts: Diame 4

Pavilhão do Maxaquene, Maputo

December 4
20:45

Boxscore

Mali	44–48	Mozambique
Scoring by quarter: 14-11, 10-11, 12-18, 8-8
Pts: Toure 17; Rebs: N.Coulibaly 11; Asts: M.Traore, Goita 2		Pts: Gimo 13; Rebs: Gimo 7 Asts: Gimo 3

Pavilhão do Maxaquene, Maputo

December 5
18:30

Boxscore

South Africa	50–58	Mali
Scoring by quarter: 9-12, 10-17, 10-15, 21-14
Pts: Mfamadi 17; Rebs: Mfamadi 7 Asts: Moutlwatse 3		Pts: Bagayoko 16; Rebs: N.Coulibaly 17; Asts: Toure 2

Pavilhão do Maxaquene, Maputo

December 5
20:45

Boxscore

Angola	41–52	Mozambique
Scoring by quarter: 6-15, 14-12, 8-15, 13-10
Pts: Etelvina 9 Rebs: Nadir 8 Asts: Eva 2		Pts: Gimo 12; Rebs: Vaneza 10; Asts: A.Cossa 5

Pavilhão do Maxaquene, Maputo

December 6
18:30

Boxscore

Senegal	66–39	Mali
Scoring by quarter: 12-12, 11-12, 20-4, 23-11
Pts: Sarr 19; Rebs: Diame 5 Asts: Diame 3		Pts: Goita 10; Rebs: N.Coulibaly, F.Traoré 4 Asts: Laoudy Maiga, Goita 1

Pavilhão do Maxaquene, Maputo

December 6
20:45

Boxscore

Angola	44–48	South Africa
Scoring by quarter: 7-16, 9-12, 18-13, 10-7
Pts: Cláudia 13; Rebs: Cláudia 14; Asts: Yara 4		Pts: Mfamadi 23; Rebs: Khoabane 10; Asts: Kermis 4

Pavilhão do Maxaquene, Maputo

== Knockout stage ==
Semi-finals
December 8–20:45
Mozambique	57
South Africa	48
December 8–18:30
Mali	72
Senegal	57

Final
December 9–20:45
Mozambique	47
Mali	49
Third place
December 9–18:30
South Africa	37
Senegal	80

=== Semifinals ===
December 8
18:30

Boxscore

Mali	83–37	Senegal
Scoring by quarter: 13-7, 20-12, 14-16, 25-22
Pts: N.Coulibaly 19; Rebs: N.Coulibaly 16; Asts: Toure 5		Pts: Diame 17; Rebs: S.Sy 9 Asts: Diame 3

Pavilhão do Maxaquene, Maputo

December 8
20:45

Boxscore

Mozambique	57–48	South Africa
Scoring by quarter: 12-13, 16-10, 12-12, 17-13
Pts: A.Cossa 12; Rebs: Gimo 16; Asts: Vaneza 6		Pts: Mfamadi 16; Rebs: Khoabane 12; Asts: Moutlwatse 3

Pavilhão do Maxaquene, Maputo

=== Bronze medal match ===
December 9
18:30

Boxscore

South Africa	37–80	Senegal
Scoring by quarter: 5-15, 16-23, 7-13, 9-29
Pts: Kermis 13; Rebs: Kermis, Mfamadi 3 Asts: Mfamadi 2		Pts: S.Sy 19; Rebs: Sarr 9 Asts: Diame, Diata 4

Pavilhão do Maxaquene, Maputo

=== Final ===
December 9
20:45

Boxscore

Mozambique	47–49	Mali
Scoring by quarter: 10-13, 10-12, 12-15, 15-9
Pts: A.Cossa 14; Rebs: Gimo 11; Asts: A.Cossa 3		Pts: N.Coulibaly 12; Rebs: N.Coulibaly 21; Asts: four players 1

Pavilhão do Maxaquene, Maputo

== Final standings ==
Qualified for the 2007 U-17 Women's World Cup

Rank	Team	Record
Gold medal	Mali	4–2
Silver medal	Mozambique	5–1
Bronze medal	Senegal	3–3
4	South Africa	1–5
5	Angola	1–3

== Awards ==
2006 FIBA Africa U20 Championship for Women winners

Mali
First title

Most Valuable Player
(Mozambique) Anabela Cossa

=== All-Tournament Team ===
- (Mozambique) Anabela Cossa
- (Mali) Fanta Toure
- (Senegal) Magatte Sarr
- (Mali) Naignouma Coulibaly
- (Mozambique) Deolinda Gimo

== Statistical leaders ==
=== Individual Tournament Highs ===
Points

Rank	Name	G	Pts	PPG
1	(Senegal) Magatte Sarr	6	82	13.7
2	(Senegal) Ndèye Sène	5	62	12.4
3	(South Africa) Takalani Mfamadi	6	73	12.2
4	(Mali) Naignouma Coulibaly	6	72	12
4	(Mozambique) Deolinda Gimo	6	72	12
6	(Angola) Catarina Eusébio	3	36	12
7	(Senegal) Sokhna Sy	6	69	11.5
8	(Mozambique) Anabela Cossa	6	67	11.2
9	(Mali) Fanta Toure	6	60	10
10	(Mozambique) Vaneza Júnior	6	55	9.2

Rebounds

Rank	Name	G	Rbs	RPG
1	(Mali) Naignouma Coulibaly	6	80	13.3
2	(Mozambique) Deolinda Gimo	6	59	9.8
3	(Angola) Cláudia António	4	37	9.2
4	(Angola) Nadir Manuel	4	35	8.8
5	(Senegal) Magatte Sarr	6	47	7.8
6	(Senegal) Sokhna Sy	6	45	7.5
7	(Mozambique) Nádia Rosário	6	40	6.7
8	(South Africa) Itumeleng Khoabane	6	36	6
9	(South Africa) Takalani Mfamadi	6	35	5.8
10	(Senegal) Nene Diame	6	33	5.5

Assists

Rank	Name	G	Ast	APG
1	(Mozambique) Anabela Cossa	6	23	3.8
2	(Senegal) Nene Diame	6	15	2.5
3	(Mozambique) Vaneza Júnior	6	13	2.2
4	(Mozambique) Deolinda Gimo	6	11	1.8
4	(South Africa) Ellen Moutlwatse	6	11	1.8
6	(Senegal) Tening Diata	6	10	1.7
6	(South Africa) Jermaine Kermis	6	10	1.7
6	(Mali) Fanta Toure	6	10	1.7
9	(Angola) Catarina Eusébio	3	5	1.7
10	(Senegal) Ndèye Sène	5	8	1.6

Steals

Rank	Name	G	Stl	SPG
1	(Angola) Catarina Eusébio	3	7	2.3
2	(Mozambique) Anabela Cossa	6	13	2.2
2	(South Africa) Takalani Mfamadi	6	13	2.2
4	(Senegal) Tening Diata	6	12	2
4	(Mozambique) Vaneza Júnior	6	12	2
6	(South Africa) Jermaine Kermis	6	11	1.8
7	(Mozambique) Deolinda Gimo	6	10	1.7
7	(South Africa) Ellen Moutlwatse	6	10	1.7
9	(Senegal) Sokhna Sy	6	9	1.5
9	(Mali) Fatoumata Traoré	6	9	1.5

Blocks

Rank	Name	G	Blk	BPG
1	(Mali) Naignouma Coulibaly	6	4	0.7
2	(Angola) Cláudia António	4	2	0.5
2	(Angola) Etelvina Cristiano	4	2	0.5
2	(Angola) Angelina Golome	4	2	0.5
5	(Mozambique) Nádia Zucule	5	2	0.4
6	(Senegal) Nene Diame	6	2	0.3
6	(Senegal) Tening Diata	6	2	0.3
6	(South Africa) Jermaine Kermis	6	2	0.3
6	(South Africa) Nathaly September	6	2	0.3
10	(Angola) Catarina Eusébio	3	1	0.3

Minutes

Rank	Name	G	Min	MPG
1	(Mozambique) Deolinda Gimo	6	206	34.3
2	(Mozambique) Vaneza Júnior	6	199	33.2
3	(Senegal) Magatte Sarr	6	198	33
4	(Mali) Fanta Toure	6	194	32.3
5	(Mozambique) Anabela Cossa	6	193	32.2
6	(Senegal) Tening Diata	6	187	31.2
7	(Mali) Naignouma Coulibaly	6	186	31
7	(Senegal) Nene Diame	6	186	31
9	(South Africa) Ellen Moutlwatse	6	183	30.5
10	(Angola) Catarina Eusébio	3	91	30.3

=== Individual Game Highs ===
Department	Name	Total	Opponent
Points	(South Africa) Takalani Mfamadi	23	Angola
Rebounds	(Mali) Naignouma Coulibaly	21	Mozambique
Assists	(Mozambique) Vaneza Júnior	6	South Africa
Steals	(South Africa) Takalani Mfamadi	7	Angola
Blocks	seven players	7	
2-point field goal percentage	(Mali) Naignouma Coulibaly	85.7% (6/7)	Mozambique
3-point field goal percentage	three players	100% (2/2)	
Free throw percentage	(Mozambique) Deolinda Gimo	100% (6/6)	Angola
Turnovers	(Senegal) Nene Diame	9	South Africa

=== Team Tournament Highs ===
Points per Game

Pos.	Name	PPG
1	Senegal	62.8
2	Mali	53.2
3	Mozambique	52.8
4	Angola	45
5	South Africa	43.7

Total Points

Pos.	Name	PPG
1	Senegal	377
2	Mali	319
3	Mozambique	317
4	South Africa	262
5	Angola	180

Rebounds

Pos.	Name	RPG
1	Angola	46.5
2	Mozambique	42.2
3	Senegal	37.8
4	Mali	35.2
5	South Africa	30.2

Assists

Pos.	Name	APG
1	Mozambique	10.8
2	Senegal	8.7
3	South Africa	7.7
4	Mali	6
5	Angola	4.3

Steals

Pos.	Name	SPG
1	South Africa	9.8
2	Mozambique	9
3	Angola	9
4	Senegal	7.8
5	Mali	6.5

Blocks

Pos.	Name	BPG
1	Angola	2
2	Mali	1
3	Mozambique	1
4	Senegal	0.8
5	South Africa	0.8

2-point field goal percentage

Pos.	Name	%
1	Mali	49.8
2	Senegal	46.3
3	South Africa	37.9
4	Mozambique	36.3
5	Angola	28.6

3-point field goal percentage

Pos.	Name	%
1	South Africa	20.5
2	Mozambique	20.4
3	Mali	20.3
4	Senegal	19.6
5	Angola	18.3

Free throw percentage

Pos.	Name	%
1	Senegal	54.5
2	Mali	54
3	Mozambique	51.2
4	Angola	48.9
5	South Africa	47.8

=== Team Game highs ===
Department	Name	Total	Opponent
Points	Senegal	80	South Africa
Rebounds	Angola	60	Senegal
Assists	Mozambique	15	South Africa
Steals	South Africa	20	Angola
Blocks	South Africa	4	Angola
2-point field goal percentage	Senegal	71.4% (25/35)	Mali
3-point field goal percentage	Angola	41.7% (5/12)	South Africa
Free throw percentage	South Africa	73.3% (11/15)	Senegal
Turnovers	Angola	32	South Africa
