= FIBA Africa Under-20 Championship for Women =

Sporting contest

The FIBA Africa Under-20 Championship for Women was a basketball competition in the International Basketball Federation's FIBA Africa zone. The event was held only twice, in 2002 and 2006, before being cancelled. The winners competed in the FIBA Under-21 World Championship for Women.

== Summary ==
Year	Host	Final			Third-place game		
Year	Host	Champion	Score	Second Place	Third Place	Score	Fourth Place
2002; Details	(Tunisia); Tunis	Tunisia	–	Senegal		–	Angola
2006; Details	(Mozambique); Maputo	Mali	49 – 47	Mozambique	Senegal	80 – 37	South Africa

== Participating nations ==
Nation	(Tunisia)	(Mozambique)	
Nation	2002	2006	
Nation	x	5	
Angola	4	5	2
Mali		2006	1
Mozambique		2006	1
Senegal	2002	2006	2
South Africa		4	1
Tunisia	2002		1
# Teams		5	

== World U-21 Championship for Women record ==
Team	(Croatia); 2003	(Russia); 2007	Total
Mali		12	1
Tunisia	12		1
Total	1	1	2

== See also ==
- FIBA Africa Championship for Women
- FIBA Africa Under-18 Championship for Women
- FIBA Africa Under-16 Championship for Women
