= 2003 FIBA World Championship for Young Women =

Tournament details
- Host country: Croatia
- City: Šibenik
- Dates: 25 July – 3 August 2003
- Teams: 12 (from 5 confederations)

Final positions
- Champions: United States (1st title)
- Runners-up: Brazil
- Third place: France

The 2003 FIBA World Championship for Young Women was the first edition of the basketball world championship for U21 women's teams, later known as the FIBA Under-21 World Championship for Women. It was played in Šibenik, Croatia, from 25 July to 3 August 2003. United States women's national under-21 basketball team won the tournament and became the world champions for the first time.

== Qualified teams ==
Qualification tournament	Berths	Qualified teams
Host nation	1	Croatia
2002 FIBA Americas Under-21 Championship for Women	3	United States; Brazil; Argentina
2002 FIBA Europe Under-20 Championship for Women	4	Czech Republic; Russia; France; Latvia
2002 ABC Under-20 Championship for Women	2	China; South Korea
2002 FIBA Africa Under-20 Championship for Women	1	Tunisia
2002 FIBA Oceania Youth Tournament for Women	1	Australia
Total	12	

== First round ==
In the first round, the teams were drawn into two groups of six. The first four teams from each group advance to the quarterfinals, the other teams will play in the 9th–12th place playoffs.

=== Group A ===
Pos	Team	Pld	W	L	PF	PA	PD	Pts	Qualification
1	France	5	4	1	342	257	+85	9	Quarterfinals
2	Brazil	5	4	1	359	291	+68	9	Quarterfinals
3	United States	5	4	1	388	271	+117	9	Quarterfinals
4	Croatia	5	2	3	314	363	−49	7	Quarterfinals
5	Czech Republic	5	1	4	309	392	−83	6	9th–12th place playoffs
6	South Korea	5	0	5	253	391	−138	5	9th–12th place playoffs

Source: FIBA Archive

25 July 2003

Boxscore

Czech Republic	84–65	South Korea

25 July 2003

Boxscore

United States	56–48	France

25 July 2003

Boxscore

Brazil	83–63	Croatia

26 July 2003

Boxscore

South Korea	46–95	United States

26 July 2003

Boxscore

Croatia	66–61	Czech Republic

26 July 2003

Boxscore

France	65–47	Brazil

27 July 2003

Boxscore

Croatia	75–55	South Korea

27 July 2003

Boxscore

Brazil	73–60	United States

27 July 2003

Boxscore

Czech Republic	59–80	France

29 July 2003

Boxscore

South Korea	44–69	Brazil

29 July 2003

Boxscore

France	81–52	Croatia

29 July 2003

Boxscore

United States	94–46	Czech Republic

30 July 2003

Boxscore

France	68–43	South Korea

30 July 2003

Boxscore

Czech Republic	59–87	Brazil

30 July 2003

Boxscore

Croatia	58–83	United States

=== Group B ===
Pos	Team	Pld	W	L	PF	PA	PD	Pts	Qualification
1	Latvia	5	5	0	384	311	+73	10	Quarterfinals
2	Australia	5	4	1	351	272	+79	9	Quarterfinals
3	Russia	5	3	2	339	304	+35	8	Quarterfinals
4	China	5	2	3	343	341	+2	7	Quarterfinals
5	Argentina	5	1	4	297	318	−21	6	9th–12th place playoffs
6	Tunisia	5	0	5	206	374	−168	5	9th–12th place playoffs

Source: FIBA Archive

25 July 2003

Boxscore

Russia	64–53	China

25 July 2003

Boxscore

Australia	58–69	Latvia

25 July 2003

Boxscore

Argentina	59–42	Tunisia

26 July 2003

Boxscore

China	67–83	Australia

26 July 2003

Boxscore

Tunisia	45–86	Russia

26 July 2003

Boxscore

Latvia	75–63	Argentina

27 July 2003

Boxscore

Tunisia	45–71	China

27 July 2003

Boxscore

Argentina	47–65	Australia

27 July 2003

Boxscore

Russia	69–71	Latvia

29 July 2003

Boxscore

China	73–68	Argentina

29 July 2003

Boxscore

Latvia	88–42	Tunisia

29 July 2003

Boxscore

Australia	75–57	Russia

30 July 2003

Boxscore

Latvia	81–79	China

30 July 2003

Boxscore

Russia	63–60	Argentina

30 July 2003

Boxscore

Tunisia	32–70	Australia

== 9th–12th place playoffs ==
9th–12th place semifinals
A5	Czech Republic	83
B6	Tunisia	28
B5	Argentina	67
A6	South Korea	58

9th place match
B6	Tunisia	47
A6	South Korea	63
11th place match
A5	Czech Republic	75
B5	Argentina	53

=== 9th–12th place semifinals ===
1 August 2003

Boxscore

Czech Republic	83–28	Tunisia

1 August 2003

Boxscore

Argentina	67–58	South Korea

=== 11th place match ===
2 August 2003

Boxscore

Tunisia	47–63	South Korea

=== 9th place match ===
2 August 2003

Boxscore

Czech Republic	75–53	Argentina

== Championship playoffs ==
Fifth place
B2	Australia	74
B3	Russia	59
Seventh place
B4	China	85
B1	Latvia	77

Consolation semifinals
B2	Australia	73
B4	China	68
B3	Russia	68
B1	Latvia	60

Quarterfinals
B2	Australia	56
A3	United States	80
A1	France	76
B4	China	57
A2	Brazil	74
B3	Russia	52
B1	Latvia	45
A4	Croatia	55

Semifinals
A3	United States	58
A1	France	47
A2	Brazil	73
A4	Croatia	65

Final
A3	United States	71
A2	Brazil	55
Third place
A1	France	80
A4	Croatia	66

=== Quarterfinals ===
1 August 2003

Boxscore

Australia	56–80	United States

1 August 2003

Boxscore

France	76–57	China

1 August 2003

Boxscore

Brazil	74–52	Russia

1 August 2003

Boxscore

Latvia	45–55	Croatia

=== 5th–8th place playoffs ===
2 August 2003

Boxscore

Australia	73–68	China

2 August 2003

Boxscore

Russia	68–60	Latvia

=== Semifinals ===
2 August 2003

Boxscore

United States	58–47	France

2 August 2003

Boxscore

Brazil	73–65	Croatia

=== 7th place match ===
3 August 2003

Boxscore

China	85–77	Latvia

=== 5th place match ===
3 August 2003

Boxscore

Australia	74–59	Russia

=== 3rd place match ===
3 August 2003

Boxscore

France	80–66	Croatia

=== Final ===
3 August 2003

Boxscore

United States	71–55	Brazil

== Final standings ==
Rank	Team
1st place, gold medalist(s)	United States
2nd place, silver medalist(s)	Brazil
3rd place, bronze medalist(s)	France
4	Croatia
5	Australia
6	Russia
7	China
8	Latvia
9	Czech Republic
10	Argentina
11	South Korea
12	Tunisia
