= Sokhna (disambiguation) =

Ain Sokhna is an Egyptian city in the Suez Governorate.

Sokhna may also refer to:

- Porto El Sokhna SC, Egyptian sports club

== People with the given name ==
- Sokhna Benga (born 1967), Senegalese novelist and poet
- Sokhna Galle (born 1994), French athlete
- Sokhna Magat Diop (1917–2003), Senegalese religious leader
- Sokhna Mame Diarra Bousso (1833–1866), Murid Saint
- Sokhna Sy (born 1988), Senegalese basketball player

== See also ==
- Sokna, Norway
