= FIBA Asia Under-20 Championship for Women =

The FIBA Asia Under-20 Championship for Women refers to the women's under-20 championship for basketball in the International Basketball Federation's FIBA Asia zone. It was also formerly known as the Asian Basketball Confederation Championship for Young Women. The winners compete in the FIBA Under-21 World Championship for Women. FIBA no longer hold world championships for this age group.

== Summary ==
Year	Host	Final			Third-place game		
Year	Host	Champion	Score	Second Place	Third Place	Score	Fourth Place
2002; Details	(China); Shijiazhuang	China	90–68	South Korea	Chinese Taipei	76–73	Japan
2006; Details	Singapore	China	69–67	Japan	Chinese Taipei	59–57	South Korea

== Medal table ==
Rank	Nation	Gold	Silver	Bronze	Total
1	China	2	0	0	2
2	Japan	0	1	0	1
2	South Korea	0	1	0	1
4	Chinese Taipei	0	0	2	2
Totals (4 entries)		2	2	2	6

== Participating nations ==
Nation	(China) 2002	(Singapore) 2006	Years
China	1st	1st	2
Chinese Taipei	3rd	3rd	2
India	7th	5th	2
Indonesia		10th	1
Japan	4th	2nd	2
Malaysia	6th		1
Mongolia	9th		1
Singapore		7th	1
South Korea	2nd	4th	2
Sri Lanka	8th	9th	2
Thailand	5th	6th	2
Uzbekistan		8th	1
Nations	9	10	
