= Tunisia women's national under-20 basketball team =

Tunisia
- Joined FIBA: 1956
- FIBA zone: FIBA Africa
- National federation: FTBB
- Nickname(s): نسور قرطاج (Eagles of Carthage)

U21 World Championships for Women
- Appearances: 1
- Medals: None

U20 African Championships for Women
- Appearances: 1
- Medals: Champions :2002
Home	Away
Medal record
Event	1st	2nd	3rd
U20 African Championships for Women	1	0	0
Total	1	0	0

The Tunisia women's national under-20 basketball team (Arabic: منتخب تونس تحت 20 سنة لكرة السلة للسيدات), nicknamed Les Aigles de Carthage (The Eagles of Carthage or The Carthage Eagles), is a national basketball team of Tunisia, administered by the Tunisia Basketball Federation (FTBB). (Arabic: الجامعة التونسية لكرة السلة) It represents the country in international under-21 and under-20 (under age 20 and under age 19) women's basketball competitions.

== Competitive record ==
Champions Runners-up Third place Fourth place

- Red border color indicates tournament was held on home soil.

=== FIBA Under-21 World Championship ===
FIBA Under-21 World Championship for Women
Appearances : 1
Year	Position	Host
(Croatia) 2003	12th	Šibenik, Croatia
(Russia) 2007	Did not participate	Moscow Oblast, Russia

=== FIBA Africa Under-20 Championship for Women ===
FIBA Africa Under-20 Championship for Women
Appearances : 1
Year	Position	Host
(Tunisia) 2002	Champions (gold)	Tunis, Tunisia
(Mozambique) 2006	Did not participate	Maputo, Mozambique

== See also ==
- Tunisia women's national basketball team
- Tunisia women's national under-19 basketball team
- Tunisia women's national under-17 basketball team
- Tunisia men's national under-20 basketball team
