= 2006 FIBA Asia Under-20 Championship for Women =

2006 FIBA Asia U-20 Championship for Women
2nd Asian Women's Basketball Championship

Tournament details
- Host country: Singapore
- Dates: December 20–27
- Teams: 10 (from 44 federations)
- Venue: 1 (in 1 host city)

Final positions
- Champions: China (2nd title)

FIBA Asia Under-20 Championship for Women 2006 is FIBA Asia's basketball championship for females under 20 years old. The games were held at Singapore.

The championship is divided into two levels: Level I and Level II. The two lowest finishers of Level I meets the top two finishers to determine which teams qualify for Level for next championship. The losers are relegated to Level II.

== Participating teams ==
Level I	Level II
China; South Korea; Japan; Chinese Taipei; Thailand; India	Sri Lanka; Singapore; Indonesia; Uzbekistan

== Preliminary round ==
=== Level I ===
Team	Pld	W	L	PF	PA	PD	Pts
Japan	5	5	0	420	258	+162	10
China	5	4	1	415	306	+109	9
South Korea	5	3	2	388	323	+65	8
Chinese Taipei	5	2	3	360	268	+92	7
India	5	1	4	265	466	−201	6
Thailand	5	0	5	233	460	−227	5

December 20
14:00

India	52–102	Chinese Taipei
Scoring by quarter: 14–28, 16–20, 9–26, 13–28

ITE College East, Singapore

December 20
16:00

China	83–81 (OT)	South Korea
Scoring by quarter: 16–23, 22–12, 13–15, 23–24, Overtime: 9–7

ITE College East, Singapore

December 20
20:30

Thailand	42–94	Japan
Scoring by quarter: 8–27, 16–18, 7–23, 11–26

ITE College East, Singapore

December 21
16:00

Thailand	39–92	China
Scoring by quarter: 7–18, 12–21, 7–26, 13–27

ITE College East, Singapore

December 21
18:00

Japan	112–28	India
Scoring by quarter: 16–9, 36–10, 35–7, 25–2

ITE College East, Singapore

December 21
20:00

Chinese Taipei	59–61	South Korea
Scoring by quarter: 16–18, 16–18, 14–12, 13–13

ITE College East, Singapore

December 22
16:00

China	57–48	Chinese Taipei
Scoring by quarter: 18–14, 15–12, 14–9, 10–13

ITE College East, Singapore

December 22
18:00

India	70–64	Thailand
Scoring by quarter: 8–13, 21–15, 15–16, 26–20

ITE College East, Singapore

December 22
20:00

South Korea	63–67	Japan
Scoring by quarter: 15–17, 15–13, 12–10, 21–27

ITE College East, Singapore

December 23
16:00

Japan	86–83	China
Scoring by quarter: 17–22, 20–18, 22–16, 27–27

ITE College East, Singapore

December 23
18:00

Thailand	37–109	Chinese Taipei
Scoring by quarter: 17–23, 10–22, 6–36, 4–28

ITE College East, Singapore

December 23
20:00

India	63–88	South Korea
Scoring by quarter: 9–30, 26–13, 10–23, 18–22

ITE College East, Singapore

December 24
16:00

China	100–52	India
Scoring by quarter: 23–9, 29–23, 29–15, 19–5

ITE College East, Singapore

December 24
18:00

South Korea	95–51	Thailand
Scoring by quarter: 20–11, 28–7, 17–13, 30–20

ITE College East, Singapore

December 24
20:00

Chinese Taipei	42–61	Japan
Scoring by quarter: 12–17, 6–21, 12–8, 12–15

ITE College East, Singapore

=== Level II ===
Team	Pld	W	L	PF	PA	PD	Pts
Singapore	3	3	0	228	171	+57	6
Uzbekistan	3	2	1	222	202	+20	5
Sri Lanka	3	1	2	201	225	−24	4
Indonesia	3	0	3	160	213	−53	3

December 20
18:00

Singapore	82–53	Sri Lanka
Scoring by quarter: 19–12, 23–10, 22–20, 18–11

ITE College East, Singapore

December 21
12:00

Sri Lanka	71–65	Indonesia
Scoring by quarter: 12–12, 16–16, 17–22, 26–15

ITE College East, Singapore

December 21
14:00

Singapore	77–71	Uzbekistan
Scoring by quarter: 9–16, 27–12, 24–18, 17–25

ITE College East, Singapore

December 22
12:00

Uzbekistan	78–77	Sri Lanka
Scoring by quarter: 23–8, 14–20, 22–23, 19–26

ITE College East, Singapore

December 22
14:00

Indonesia	47–69	Singapore
Scoring by quarter: 11–21, 13–10, 8–26, 15–12

ITE College East, Singapore

December 23
14:00

Uzbekistan	73–48	Indonesia
Scoring by quarter: 18–13, 19–9, 15–20, 21–6

ITE College East, Singapore

== Qualifying round ==
Winners are promoted to Level I.

December 26
14:00

India	77–61	Uzbekistan
Scoring by quarter: 21–17, 26–20, 18–12, 12–12

ITE College East, Singapore

December 26
16:00

Thailand	51–56	Singapore
Scoring by quarter: 9–18, 12–7, 12–17, 18–14

ITE College East, Singapore

== Final round ==
Semifinals
December 26
Japan	60
Chinese Taipei	57
December 26
China	78
South Korea	70

Final
December 27
Japan	67
China	69
3rd place
December 27
Chinese Taipei	59
South Korea	57

=== Semifinals ===
December 26
18:00

Japan	60–57	Chinese Taipei
Scoring by quarter: 12–10, 13–16, 18–14, 17–17

ITE College East, Singapore

December 26
20:00

China	78–70	South Korea
Scoring by quarter: 20–19, 24–24, 19–14, 15–13

ITE College East, Singapore

=== 3rd place ===
December 27
18:00

Chinese Taipei	59–57	South Korea
Scoring by quarter: 11–16, 9–18, 20–11, 19–12

ITE College East, Singapore

=== Final ===
December 27
20:00

Japan	67–69	China
Scoring by quarter: 12–14, 17–16, 22–25, 16–14
Pts: Tanaka, Nakagawa 16; Rebs: Yoshida 7 Asts: Nakagawa, Kabaya 3		Pts: Wang Q. 20; Rebs: Huang H.P. 12; Asts: Huang H.P. 4

ITE College East, Singapore
Referees: Tomas Jasevičius (LTU), Aleksey Davydov (RUS)

== Final standing ==
Qualified for the 2007 FIBA Under-21 World Championship for Women

Rank	Team	Record
Gold medal	China	6–1
Silver medal	Japan	6–1
Bronze medal	Chinese Taipei	3–4
4	South Korea	3–4
5	India	2–4
6	Thailand	0–6
7	Singapore	4–0
8	Uzbekistan	2–2
9	Sri Lanka	1–2
10	Indonesia	0–3

== Awards ==
2006 Asian Under-20 champions

China
Second title
