= 2006 FIBA Americas Under-20 Championship for Women =

Tournament details
- Host country: Mexico
- City: Mexico City
- Dates: 8–12 August 2006
- Teams: 6 (from 1 confederation)
- Venue(s): 1 (in 1 host city)

Final positions
- Champions: United States (2nd title)
- Runners-up: Brazil
- Third place: Canada

The 2006 FIBA Americas Under-20 Championship for Women was the second edition of the Americas under-20 women's basketball championship. The tournament took place in Mexico City, Mexico, from 8 to 12 August 2006. United States women's national under-20 basketball team won the tournament and became the Americas champions for the second time. The top three teams qualified for the 2007 FIBA Under-21 World Championship for Women.

== Participating teams ==
- Bahamas
- Brazil
- Canada
- Mexico
- Puerto Rico
- United States

== Round robin ==
Pos	Team	Pld	W	L	PF	PA	PD	Pts	Qualification
1	United States	5	5	0	521	211	+310	10	2007 FIBA Under-21 World Championship for Women
2	Brazil	5	4	1	448	301	+147	9	2007 FIBA Under-21 World Championship for Women
3	Canada	5	3	2	338	293	+45	8	2007 FIBA Under-21 World Championship for Women
4	Puerto Rico	5	2	3	347	394	−47	7	
5	Mexico	5	1	4	249	426	−177	6	
6	Bahamas	5	0	5	193	471	−278	5	

Source: FIBA Archive

== Results ==
8 August 2006

Boxscore

United States	97–57	Puerto Rico

8 August 2006

Boxscore

Brazil	72–59	Canada

8 August 2006

Boxscore

Mexico	68–43	Bahamas

9 August 2006

Boxscore

Canada	39–90	United States

9 August 2006

Boxscore

Bahamas	33–111	Brazil

9 August 2006

Boxscore

Puerto Rico	79–57	Mexico

10 August 2006

Boxscore

Canada	87–38	Bahamas

10 August 2006

Boxscore

Brazil	99–68	Puerto Rico

10 August 2006

Boxscore

Mexico	38–124	United States

11 August 2006

Boxscore

Bahamas	23–114	United States

11 August 2006

Boxscore

Puerto Rico	52–85	Canada

11 August 2006

Boxscore

Mexico	45–112	Brazil

12 August 2006

Boxscore

Bahamas	56–91	Puerto Rico

12 August 2006

Boxscore

United States	96–54	Brazil

12 August 2006

Boxscore

Canada	68–41	Mexico

== Final standings ==
Rank	Team
1st place, gold medalist(s)	United States
2nd place, silver medalist(s)	Brazil
3rd place, bronze medalist(s)	Canada
4	Puerto Rico
5	Mexico
6	Bahamas
