= FIBA Americas Under-20 Championship for Women =

Basketball championship

- Formerly: FIBA Americas Under-21 Championship for Women
- Sport: Basketball
- Founded: 2002
- Founder: FIBA Americas
- First season: 2002
- Folded: 2006
- Continent: Americas
- Last champions: United States (2nd title)
- Most titles: United States (2 titles)
- Related competitions: FIBA Under-21 World Championship for Women

The FIBA Americas Under-20 Women's Championship was the Americas basketball championship for women under 20 years that was played every four years. In the 2002 edition, the championship was played by under-21 teams. The Under-20 format became defunct after the 2006 edition.

== Summaries ==
Year	Location	Gold	Silver	Bronze	4th Place
2002	(Brazil) Ribeirão Preto	United States	Brazil	Argentina	Puerto Rico
2006	Mexico City	United States	Brazil	Canada	Puerto Rico

== Participation details ==
Team	(Brazil); 2002	(Mexico); 2006	Total
Argentina	3rd	-	1
Bahamas	-	6th	1
Brazil	2nd	2nd	2
Canada	5th	3rd	2
Costa Rica	7th	-	1
Mexico	-	5th	1
Puerto Rico	4th	4th	2
United States	1st	1st	2
Venezuela	6th	-	1

== Medal table ==
Rank	Nation	Gold	Silver	Bronze	Total
1	United States	2	0	0	2
2	Brazil	0	2	0	2
3	Argentina	0	0	1	1
3	Canada	0	0	1	1
Totals (4 entries)		2	2	2	6
