= 2002 ABC Under-20 Championship for Women =

2002 FIBA Asia U-20 Championship for Women
1st Asian Women's Basketball Championship

Tournament details
- Host country: China
- Dates: October 28 – November 3
- Teams: 9 (from 44 federations)
- Venues: 2 (in 1 host city)

Final positions
- Champions: China (1st title)

ABC Under-20 Championship for Women 2002 is ABC's basketball championship for females under 20 years old. The games were held at Shijiazhuang, China.

== Preliminary round ==
=== Group A ===
Team	Pld	W	L	PF	PA	PD	Pts
South Korea	3	3	0	310	151	+159	6
Chinese Taipei	3	2	1	288	227	+61	5
Thailand	3	1	2	275	228	+47	4
Sri Lanka	3	0	3	122	389	−267	3

October 28
19:30

South Korea	127–21	Sri Lanka

Zhongshan Gymnasium, Shijiazhuang

October 28
21:30

Chinese Taipei	87–84	Thailand

Zhongshan Gymnasium, Shijiazhuang

October 30
19:30

Thailand	70–99	South Korea

Zhongshan Gymnasium, Shijiazhuang

October 30
21:30

Sri Lanka	59–141	Chinese Taipei

Zhongshan Gymnasium, Shijiazhuang

October 31
19:30

Thailand	121–42	Sri Lanka

Hebei Gymnasium, Shijiazhuang

October 31
21:30

South Korea	84–60	Chinese Taipei

Hebei Gymnasium, Shijiazhuang

=== Group B ===
Team	Pld	W	L	PF	PA	PD	Pts
China	4	4	0	480	171	+309	8
Japan	4	3	1	438	262	+176	7
Malaysia	4	2	2	280	279	+1	6
India	4	1	3	326	407	−81	5
Mongolia	4	0	4	151	556	−405	4

October 28
19:30

China	127–40	India

Hebei Gymnasium, Shijiazhuang

October 28
21:30

Japan	78–54	Malaysia
Scoring by quarter: 17–11, 25–10, 22–14, 14–19

Hebei Gymnasium, Shijiazhuang

October 29
19:30

India	79–134	Japan
Scoring by quarter: 19–31, 18–37, 22–40, 20–26

Hebei Gymnasium, Shijiazhuang

October 29
21:30

Mongolia	17–157	China

Hebei Gymnasium, Shijiazhuang

October 30
19:30

Mongolia	43–102	Malaysia

Hebei Gymnasium, Shijiazhuang

October 30
21:30

China	106–68	Japan
Scoring by quarter: 30–21, 31–17, 25–21, 20–9

Hebei Gymnasium, Shijiazhuang

October 31
19:30

Malaysia	46–90	China

Zhongshan Gymnasium, Shijiazhuang

October 31
21:30

India	139–68	Mongolia

Zhongshan Gymnasium, Shijiazhuang

November 1
19:30

Mongolia	23–158	Japan
Scoring by quarter: 6–51, 7–42, 6–37, 4–28

Hebei Gymnasium, Shijiazhuang

November 1
21:30

Malaysia	78–68	India

Hebei Gymnasium, Shijiazhuang

== Classification 5th–8th ==
=== 7th place ===
November 2
19:30

Sri Lanka	vs.	India

Zhongshan Gymnasium, Shijiazhuang

=== 5th place ===
November 2
19:30

Thailand	vs.	Malaysia

Hebei Gymnasium, Shijiazhuang

== Final round ==
Semifinals
November 2
South Korea	84
Japan	70
November 2
China	109
Chinese Taipei	54

Final
November 3
South Korea	68
China	90
3rd place
November 3
Japan	73
Chinese Taipei	76

=== Semifinals ===
December 26
21:30

South Korea	84–70	Japan
Scoring by quarter: 15–20, 26–13, 23–8, 20–29

Zhongshan Gymnasium, Shijiazhuang

December 26
21:30

China	109–54	Chinese Taipei

Hebei Gymnasium, Shijiazhuang

=== 3rd place ===
December 27
19:30

Japan	73–76	Chinese Taipei
Scoring by quarter: 18–20, 17–18, 18–14, 20–24

Hebei Gymnasium, Shijiazhuang

=== Final ===
December 27
21:30

South Korea	68–90	China

Hebei Gymnasium, Shijiazhuang

== Final standing ==
Qualified for the 2003 FIBA World Championship for Young Women

Rank	Team	Record
Gold medal	China	6–0
Silver medal	South Korea	4–1
Bronze medal	Chinese Taipei	3–2
4	Japan	3–3
5	Thailand	2–2
6	Malaysia	2–3
7	India	2–3
8	Sri Lanka	0–4
9	Mongolia	0–4

== Awards ==
2002 Asian Under-20 champions

China
First title
