= United States women's national under-21 basketball team =

United States
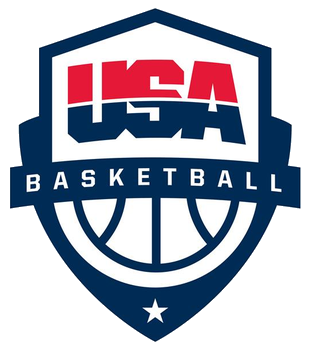
- FIBA zone: FIBA Americas
- National federation: USA Basketball

FIBA Under-21 World Championship for Women
- Medals: Gold: 2003, 2007

FIBA Americas Under-20 Championship for Women
- Medals: Gold: 2002, 2006
Medal record
FIBA Under-21 World Championship for Women
Gold medal – first place	2003 Šibenik
Gold medal – first place	2007 Moscow Oblast
FIBA Americas Under-20 Championship for Women
Gold medal – first place	2002 Ribeirão Preto
Gold medal – first place	2006 Mexico City

The United States women's national under-20 and under-21 basketball team is a national basketball team of the United States, administered by USA Basketball. It represents the country in international under-20 and under-21 basketball competitions between 2002–2007, after the format became defunct and no longer holds for this age group.

== Competitive record ==
=== FIBA Under-21 World Championship for Women ===
Year	Result	Position	Pld	W	L	Ref
(Croatia) 2003	Champions	1st	8	7	1	
(Russia) 2007	Champions	1st	8	8	0	
Total	2 titles	2/2	16	15	1	—

=== FIBA Americas Under-20 Championship for Women ===
Year	Result	Position	Pld	W	L	Ref
(Brazil) 2002	Champions	1st				
(Mexico) 2006	Champions	1st	5	5	0	
Total	2 titles	2/2				—
