= Sokhna Magat Diop =

- Born: c. 1917
- Died: 18 March 2003
- Occupation: Religious leader

Sokhna Magat Diop (c. 1917–18 March 2003) was a Senegalese religious leader.

== Life ==
She headed the Mouride community, of which her father had been the leader; he named her to be head of one section in 1943, having no male heirs and recognizing her abilities. In 1990 a history of her work in the community, L'Islam au féminin: Sokhna Magat Diop, cheikh de la confrérie mouride by Christian Coulon and Odile Reveyrand, was published.
