= ITE College East =

Singapore vocational school

- 工艺教育东区学院 (Chinese); Institut Pendidikan Teknikal Kolej Timur (Malay)

Location
- 10 Simei Avenue, Singapore 486047; 1°20′4.11″N 103°57′16.93″E

Information
- Type: Public; Government
- Motto: A College of Enterprise & Innovation
- Established: 3 January 2005; 21 years ago
- School board: Institute of Technical Education
- Principal: Alvin Goh
- Campus: 10.7 hectares (26 acres)
- Website: Official website
- ITE College East

Agency overview
- Jurisdiction: Government of Singapore
- Parent agency: Ministry of Education

ITE College East (ITECE) is a post-secondary education institution and statutory board under the purview of the Ministry of Education in Singapore.

It is one of the Institute of Technical Education's three colleges under the "One ITE System, Three Colleges" Governance and Education Model.

== Academic schools and courses ==
ITE College East has four Schools - Business & Services, Electronics & Info-comm Technology, Engineering and the School of Health Sciences.

== See also ==
- Institute of Technical Education
- ITE College Central
- ITE College West
