= Yolanda Jones =

Puerto Rican basketball player

No. 23 – Gigantes de Carolina
- Position: Power forward
- League: BSN

Personal information
- Born: March 6, 1984 (age 42) Lumberton, North Carolina, U.S.
- Listed height: 6 ft 0 in (1.83 m)

Career information
- College: Louisiana (2007)
- WNBA draft: 2007: undrafted
Medals
Women's basketball
Representing Puerto Rico
Pan American Games
Gold medal – first place	2011 Guadalajara	Team
Central American and Caribbean Games
Silver medal – second place	2014 Veracruz	Team
Bronze medal – third place	2018 Barranquilla	Team

Yolanda Jones (born March 6, 1984) is a Puerto Rican basketball player for Gigantes de Carolina and the Puerto Rican national team.

She participated at the 2018 FIBA Women's Basketball World Cup. Jones played JUCO ball at Trinity Valley Community College.

== Louisiana statistics ==
Legend
GP	Games played	GS	Games started	MPG	Minutes per game
FG%	Field goal percentage	3P%	3-point field goal percentage	FT%	Free throw percentage
RPG	Rebounds per game	APG	Assists per game	SPG	Steals per game
BPG	Blocks per game	PPG	Points per game	**Bold**	Career high

Year	Team	GP	Points	FG%	3P%	FT%	RPG	APG	SPG	BPG	PPG
2005-06	Louisiana at Lafayette	28	508	41.7%	25.0%	**63.4%**	**10.9**	1.1	1.8	0.5	**18.1**
2006-07	Louisiana at Lafayette	**33**	**582**	**46.9%**	**34.7%**	59.4%	10.2	**1.8**	**2.1**	**0.6**	17.6
Career		61	1090	44.4%	29.9%	61.4%	10.5	1.5	1.9	0.6	17.9
