= Magatte Sarr =

French association football player (born 1999)

Personal information
- Date of birth: 2 September 1999 (age 27)
- Height: 1.83 m (6 ft 0 in)
- Position: Winger

Youth career
- –2018: Auxerre
- 2018–2019: Enosis

Senior career*
Years	Team	Apps	(Gls)
2018–2020	Enosis Neon	1	(0)
2019–2020	→ Ermis Aradippou (loan)	2	(0)
2021–2022	La Châtaigneraie	5	(0)
- * Club domestic league appearances and goals as of 00:02, 5 March 2020 (UTC)

Magatte Sarr (born 2 September 1999) is a French footballer.

The Senegalese born winger was part of the Auxerre U18 side that won the Coupe Gambardella in 2014. Sarr, who was just 15 at the time, was an unused substitute in the final.

== Career statistics ==
=== Club ===
As of 7 December 2019.

Club	Season	League			Cup		Other		Total	
Club	Season	Division	Apps	Goals	Apps	Goals	Apps	Goals	Apps	Goals
Enosis	2018–19	Cypriot First Division	1	0	0	0	0	0	1	0
Enosis	2019–20	Cypriot First Division	0	0	0	0	0	0	0	0
Career total			1	0	0	0	0	0	1	0
