= Adewunmi Aderemi =

Nigerian women's basketball coach

Adewunmi Aderemi is a Nigerian women's basketball coach. He coached First Bank BC in Nigeria's top professional league, for 14 seasons. Internationally, Aderemi served as an assistant coach for the Nigeria women's national basketball team including in the 2016 FIBA World Olympic Qualifying Tournament for Women.

He coached First Bank BC at multiple FIBA Africa Women's Clubs Champions Cup's prior to being replaced in October 2015, by Peter Ahmedu.
