= 2007 FIBA Under-21 World Championship for Women =

Tournament details
- Host country: Russia
- City: Moscow Oblast
- Dates: 29 June – 8 July 2007
- Teams: 12 (from 5 confederations)

Final positions
- Champions: United States (2nd title)
- Runners-up: Australia
- Third place: France

The 2007 FIBA Under-21 World Championship for Women was the second edition of the basketball world championship for U21 women's teams. It was played in Moscow Oblast, Russia, from 29 June to 8 July 2007. United States women's national under-21 basketball team won the tournament and became the world champions for the second time.

== Qualified teams ==
Qualification tournament	Berths	Qualified teams
Host nation	1	Russia
2006 FIBA Americas Under-20 Championship for Women	3	United States; Brazil; Canada
2006 FIBA Europe Under-20 Championship for Women	4	Hungary; France; Spain; Belgium
2006 FIBA Asia Under-20 Championship for Women	2	China; Japan
2006 FIBA Africa Under-20 Championship for Women	1	Mali
2006 FIBA Oceania Under-20 Championship for Women	1	Australia
Total	12	

== First round ==
In the first round, the teams were drawn into two groups of six. The first four teams from each group advance to the quarterfinals, the other teams will play in the 9th–12th place playoffs.

=== Group A ===
Pos	Team	Pld	W	L	PF	PA	PD	Pts	Qualification
1	France	5	5	0	433	307	+126	10	Quarterfinals
2	Russia	5	4	1	432	301	+131	9	Quarterfinals
3	Canada	5	3	2	326	313	+13	8	Quarterfinals
4	Belgium	5	2	3	382	383	−1	7	Quarterfinals
5	China	5	1	4	343	397	−54	6	9th–12th place playoffs
6	Mali	5	0	5	242	457	−215	5	9th–12th place playoffs

Source: FIBA Archive

29 June 2007

Boxscore

China	59–87	France

29 June 2007

Boxscore

Russia	83–56	Canada

29 June 2007

Boxscore

Mali	66–91	Belgium

30 June 2007

Boxscore

France	111–45	Mali

30 June 2007

Boxscore

Canada	78–54	China

30 June 2007

Boxscore

Belgium	77–87	Russia

1 July 2007

Boxscore

Mali	47–71	Canada

1 July 2007

Boxscore

France	91–80	Belgium

1 July 2007

Boxscore

China	70–97	Russia

3 July 2007

Boxscore

Belgium	76–70	China

3 July 2007

Boxscore

Russia	94–25	Mali

3 July 2007

Boxscore

Canada	52–71	France

4 July 2007

Boxscore

Canada	69–58	Belgium

4 July 2007

Boxscore

Mali	59–90	China

4 July 2007

Boxscore

France	73–71	Russia

=== Group B ===
Pos	Team	Pld	W	L	PF	PA	PD	Pts	Qualification
1	United States	5	5	0	458	317	+141	10	Quarterfinals
2	Australia	5	4	1	425	372	+53	9	Quarterfinals
3	Hungary	5	3	2	373	373	0	8	Quarterfinals
4	Brazil	5	1	4	357	422	−65	6	Quarterfinals
5	Spain	5	1	4	371	411	−40	6	9th–12th place playoffs
6	Japan	5	1	4	349	438	−89	6	9th–12th place playoffs

Source: FIBA Archive

29 June 2007

Boxscore

Spain	90–86	Brazil

29 June 2007

Boxscore

United States	90–88	Australia

29 June 2007

Boxscore

Hungary	77–58	Japan

30 June 2007

Boxscore

Australia	82–72	Hungary

30 June 2007

Boxscore

Japan	90–87	Spain

30 June 2007

Boxscore

Brazil	40–96	United States

1 July 2007

Boxscore

Japan	72–85	Brazil

1 July 2007

Boxscore

Hungary	70–93	United States

1 July 2007

Boxscore

Spain	56–75	Australia

3 July 2007

Boxscore

Brazil	64–75	Hungary

3 July 2007

Boxscore

United States	81–62	Spain

3 July 2007

Boxscore

Australia	91–72	Japan

4 July 2007

Boxscore

Australia	89–82	Brazil

4 July 2007

Boxscore

Japan	57–98	United States

4 July 2007

Boxscore

Spain	76–79	Hungary

== 9th–12th place playoffs ==
9th–12th place semifinals
A5	China	62
B6	Japan	74
B5	Spain	75
A6	Mali	48

9th place match
B6	Japan	70
B5	Spain	80
11th place match
A5	China	73
A6	Mali	46

=== 9th–12th place semifinals ===
6 July 2007

Boxscore

China	62–74	Japan

6 July 2007

Boxscore

Spain	75–48	Mali

=== 11th place match ===
7 July 2007

Boxscore

China	73–46	Mali

=== 9th place match ===
7 July 2007

Boxscore

Japan	70–80	Spain

== Championship playoffs ==
Fifth place
A3	Canada	67
A4	Belgium	72
Seventh place
B4	Brazil	67
B3	Hungary	75

Consolation semifinals
A3	Canada	74
B4	Brazil	69
B3	Hungary	64
A4	Belgium	73

Quarterfinals
B2	Australia	98
A3	Canada	57
A1	France	85
B4	Brazil	68
A2	Russia	71
B3	Hungary	55
B1	United States	104
A4	Belgium	53

Semifinals
B2	Australia	88
A1	France	81
A2	Russia	61
B1	United States	86

Final
B2	Australia	73
B1	United States	96
Third place
A1	France	67
A2	Russia	61

=== Quarterfinals ===
6 July 2007

Boxscore

Australia	98–57	Canada

6 July 2007

Boxscore

France	85–68	Brazil

6 July 2007

Boxscore

Russia	71–55	Hungary

6 July 2007

Boxscore

United States	104–53	Belgium

=== 5th–8th place playoffs ===
7 July 2007

Boxscore

Canada	74–69	Brazil

7 July 2007

Boxscore

Hungary	64–73	Belgium

=== Semifinals ===
7 July 2007

Boxscore

Australia	88–81	France

7 July 2007

Boxscore

Russia	61–86	United States

=== 7th place match ===
8 July 2007

Boxscore

Brazil	67–75	Hungary

=== 5th place match ===
8 July 2007

Boxscore

Canada	67–72	Belgium

=== 3rd place match ===
8 July 2007

Boxscore

France	67–61	Russia

=== Final ===
8 July 2007

Boxscore

Australia	73–96	United States

== Final standings ==
Rank	Team
1st place, gold medalist(s)	United States
2nd place, silver medalist(s)	Australia
3rd place, bronze medalist(s)	France
4	Russia
5	Belgium
6	Canada
7	Hungary
8	Brazil
9	Spain
10	Japan
11	China
12	Mali
