= Fatoumata Bagayoko =

Malian basketball player (born 1988)

No. 7 – Stade Malien
- Position: Guard

Personal information
- Born: 23 May 1988 (age 38) Bamako, Mali
- Listed height: 5 ft 7 in (1.70 m)
Medals
Women's basketball
Representing Mali
African Games
Gold medal – first place	2015 Brazzaville	Team
AfroBasket
Bronze medal – third place	2017 Mali

Fatoumata Bagayoko (born 23 May 1988) is a Malian women's basketball player. Bagayoko competed for Mali at the 2008 Summer Olympics, where she scored 21 in 5 games, including 8 points in the final loss to Spain. She was born in Bamako and plays for Djoliba AC women's basketball team.
