= Kani Kouyaté =

Ivorian basketball player

Personal information
- Born: August 8, 1990 (age 36) Treichville, Ivory Coast
- Listed height: 1.78 m (5 ft 10 in)
- Position: Shooting guard

Career history
- 2007-2013: C.S. d'Abidjan
- 2014: Nantes Rezé

Kani Kouyaté (born August 8, 1990) is an Ivorian female professional basketball player.
