= FIBA Under-21 World Championship for Women =

International basketball tournament

- Sport: Basketball
- Founded: 2003
- Founder: FIBA
- First season: 2003
- Folded: 2007
- Last champions: United States (2nd title)
- Most titles: United States (2 titles)
- Related competitions: FIBA Under-17 Women's Basketball World Cup; FIBA Under-19 Women's Basketball World Cup
- Website: www.fiba.basketball/history

The FIBA Under-21 World Championship for Women was a women's under-21 only basketball competition organized by FIBA, first held in 2003. FIBA no longer holds world championships for this age group.

== Summaries ==
Year	Hosts	Final			Third Place Match		
Year	Hosts	Champions	Score	Runners-up	Third Place	Score	Fourth Place
2003	(Croatia); Šibenik	United States	71–55	Brazil	France	80–66	Croatia
2007	(Russia); Moscow Oblast	United States	96–73	Australia	France	67–61	Russia

== Medal table ==
Rank	Nation	Gold	Silver	Bronze	Total
1	United States	2	0	0	2
2	Australia	0	1	0	1
2	Brazil	0	1	0	1
4	France	0	0	2	2
Totals (4 entries)		2	2	2	6

== Participation details ==
Team	(Croatia) 2003	(Russia) 2007	Total
Argentina	10th		1
Australia	5th	2nd	2
Belgium		5th	1
Brazil	2nd	8th	2
Canada		6th	1
China	7th	11th	2
Croatia	4th		1
Czech Republic	9th		1
France	3rd	3rd	2
Hungary		7th	1
Japan		10th	1
South Korea	11th		1
Latvia	8th		1
Mali		12th	1
Russia	6th	4th	2
Spain		9th	1
Tunisia	12th		1
United States	1st	1st	2
Totals (18 nations)	12	12	
