= Minata Keita =

Malian basketball player (born 1989)

No. 17 – Celta de Vigo
- Position: Center
- League: LFB

Personal information
- Born: March 15, 1989 (age 37) Bamako, Mali
- Listed height: 6 ft 3 in (1.91 m)
Medals
Women's basketball
Representing Mali
AfroBasket
Bronze medal – third place	2017 Mali

Minata Keita (born March 15, 1989) is a Malian basketball player for Celta de Vigo and the Malian national team.

She participated at the 2017 Women's Afrobasket.
