= Assétou Kolga =

Ivorian basketball player

Personal information
- Born: April 24, 1988 (age 38) Treichville, Ivory Coast
- Listed height: 1.70 m (5 ft 7 in)
- Position: Point guard / shooting guard

Career history
- 2007-2013: CS d'Abidjan

Assétou Kolga (born April 24, 1988) is an Ivorian female professional basketball player.
