= Madalena Felix =

Angolan basketball player

Primeiro de Agosto
- Position: Point guard
- League: Angolan League; Africa Club Champions Cup

Personal information
- Born: September 20, 1989 (age 37) Luanda, Angola
- Listed height: 179 cm (5 ft 10 in)
- Listed weight: 78 kg (172 lb)

Career history
- 2006–2013: Primeiro de Agosto

Madalena de Carvalho Félix (born September 20, 1989) is an Angolan basketball player. At the 2012 Summer Olympics, she competed for the Angola women's national basketball team in the women's event. She is 5 ft 10 inches tall.
