= Nassira Traoré =

Malian basketball player (born 1988)

No. 4 – US Colomiers
- Position: Forward
- League: LFB

Personal information
- Born: 28 October 1988 (age 38) Bamako, Mali
- Listed height: 1.81 m (5 ft 11 in)
- Listed weight: 77 kg (170 lb)

Career information
- WNBA draft: 2013: undrafted
Medals
Women's basketball
Representing Mali
African Games
Gold medal – first place	2015 Brazzaville	Team
AfroBasket
Silver medal – second place	2021 Cameroon
Bronze medal – third place	2017 Mali
Bronze medal – third place	2019 Senegal

Nassira Traoré (born 28 October 1988) is a Malian women's basketball player for US Colomiers. Traore competed for Mali at the 2008 Summer Olympics, where she did not score in 4 games. As part of the Malian national team, she participated in the 2017 Women's Basketball Africa Championship in Bamako. The national team finished 3rd, earning the bronze medal. Traoré was also part of the squad at the 2019 Women's Basketball Africa Championship in Dakar. The national team again finished in 3rd place, earning the bronze medal once again.
