= Sokhna Sy =

Senegalese basketball player

Personal information
- Born: October 17, 1988 (age 38) Gaudiaye, Senegal
- Listed height: 6 ft 0 in (1.83 m)
- Position: Guard
Medals
Women's basketball
Representing Senegal
AfroBasket
Silver medal – second place	2017 Mali

Sokhna Sy (born October 17, 1988) is a Senegalese basketball player for the Senegalese national team.

She participated at the 2017 Women's Afrobasket.
