= Fineza Eusébio =

Angolan basketball player

No. 4 – Primeiro de Agosto
- Position: Point guard
- League: Angolan League; Africa Club Champions Cup

Personal information
- Born: 18 July 1990 (age 36) Luanda, Angola
- Listed height: 178 cm (5 ft 10 in)
- Listed weight: 70 kg (154 lb)

Career information
- Playing career: 2006–present

Career history
- 2006–present: Primeiro de Agosto

Fineza da Silva Eusébio (born 18 July 1990, Luanda) is an Angolan basketball player. At the 2012 Summer Olympics, she competed for the Angola women's national basketball team in the women's event. She is 5 ft 10 inches tall.
