= 2007 FIBA Africa Championship for Women squads =

2009 FIBA Africa Championship for Women squads

This article displays the rosters for the participating teams at the 2007 FIBA Africa Championship for Women.

== Group A ==
=== Ivory Coast ===
Ivory Coast women's national basketball team – 2007 FIBA Africa Championship – 8th place roster
Players
Coaches

Pos.	No.	Name	Age – Date of birth	Height	Club	Ctr.
G	4	Fatoumata Koné	19 – 7 September 1988	1.67 m (5 ft 6 in)
	5	Mariam Kolga	24 – 31 May 1983
	6	Mariam Gbane	25 – 16 April 1982
	7	Awa Kone	19 – 21 March 1988
	8	Brou N'Goran	20 – 4 May 1987
	9	Masouratou Youssouf	22 – 11 November 1984
	10	Fatou Diabate	32 – 12 March 1975
	11	Edjime Djedjemel	18 – 29 October 1988	1.88 m (6 ft 2 in)
G	12	Aïchata Diomande	23 – 17 July 1984	1.69 m (5 ft 7 in)
SG	13	Kani Kouyaté	17 – 8 August 1990	1.78 m (5 ft 10 in)
	14	Minata Fofana	21 – 22 March 1986
G	15	Assétou Kolga	19 – 24 April 1988	1.70 m (5 ft 7 in)

Head coach

- (France) Simon Guillou

Assistant coach

Legend

- (C) Team captain
- Club field describes current club

=== Madagascar ===
Madagascar women's national basketball team – 2007 FIBA Africa Championship – 10th place roster
Players
Coaches

Pos.	No.	Name	Age – Date of birth	Height	Club	Ctr.
	4	Lalatiana Rajoelisoa	28 – 27 February 1979
	5	Eléonore Ravonimboangy	35 – 14 June 1972
	6	Lalatiana Razaiarisoa	39 – 23 August 1968
	7	Tanteliharilala Rakotonirina	22 – 21 April 1985
	9	Ange Rasoambolanoro	23 – 25 July 1984
	10	Prisca Razananirina	27 – 19 April 1980
	11	Nirina Rabemiarana	26 – 22 March 1981
	12	Zafiliay Elina	19 – 28 April 1988
	14	Nahirae Solinasoa	22 – 15 September 1985
	15	Lydia Rasoanirina	35 – 10 September 1972

Head coach

Assistant coach

Legend

- (C) Team captain
- Club field describes current club

=== Mali ===
Mali women's national basketball team – 2007 FIBA Africa Championship – Gold Medal roster
Players
Coaches

Pos.	No.	Name	Age – Date of birth	Height	Club	Ctr.
G	4	Kadia Touré	24 – 18 January 1983	1.80 m (5 ft 11 in)
	5	Kadia Sacko	19 – 25 April 1988
	6	Adizatou Maiga	23 – 30 October 1983	1.72 m (5 ft 8 in)
	7	Fatoumata Bagayoko	19 – 23 May 1988	1.70 m (5 ft 7 in)
	8	Fanta Toure	18 – 18 February 1989
	9	Hamchétou Maïga	29 – 25 April 1978	1.84 m (6 ft 0 in)
	10	Kadiatou Kanoute	29 – 11 June 1978	1.78 m (5 ft 10 in)
C	11	Djene Diawara	22 – 29 January 1985	1.92 m (6 ft 4 in)
	12	Nare Diawara	24 – 22 January 1983
	13	Haoua Sangare	26 – 15 October 1980
C	14	Aminata Sininta	21 – 23 December 1985	1.88 m (6 ft 2 in)
C	15	Naignouma Coulibaly	18 – 31 May 1989	1.92 m (6 ft 4 in)

Head coach

Assistant coach

Legend

- (C) Team captain
- Club field describes current club

=== Mozambique ===
Mozambique women's national basketball team – 2007 FIBA Africa Championship – 4th place roster
Players
Coaches

Pos.	No.	Name	Age – Date of birth	Height	Club	Ctr.
	4	Valerdina Manhonga	26 – 26 December 1980	1.68 m (5 ft 6 in)
	5	Deolinda Ngulela	26 – 18 April 1981	1.70 m (5 ft 7 in)
	6	Anabela Cossa	21 – 7 April 1986	1.72 m (5 ft 8 in)
	7	Carla Silva	29 – 12 March 1978
C	8	Clarisse Machanguana	33 – 4 October 1973	1.95 m (6 ft 5 in)
	9	Nádia Rodrigues	27 – 8 April 1980
	10	Ana Branquinho	27 – 2 February 1980
	11	Aleia Rachide	22 – 23 January 1985
	12	Rute Muianga	24 – 6 April 1983
	13	Nica Gemo	24 – 2 December 1982
	14	Iracema Ndauane	26 – 19 October 1980
C	15	Deolinda Gimo	20 – 15 August 1987	1.90 m (6 ft 3 in)

Head coach

- (Mozambique) Nazir Salé

Assistant coach

- (Mozambique) Simão Mataveia

Legend

- (C) Team captain
- Club field describes current club

=== Senegal ===
Senegal women's national basketball team – 2007 FIBA Africa Championship – Silver Medal roster
Players
Coaches

Pos.	No.	Name	Age – Date of birth	Height	Club	Ctr.
	4	Fatou Balayara	27 – 8 February 1980
G	5	Aya Traoré	24 – 27 July 1983	1.84 m (6 ft 0 in)
F	6	Awa Gueye	29 – 31 August 1978	1.82 m (6 ft 0 in)
F	7	Adama Diakhate	37 – 3 February 1970	1.78 m (5 ft 10 in)
F	8	Mame Diodio Diouf	22 – 15 December 1984	1.75 m (5 ft 9 in)
PF	9	Salimata Diatta	26 – 14 April 1981	1.84 m (6 ft 0 in)
PF	10	Astou Traore	26 – 30 April 1981	1.81 m (5 ft 11 in)
	11	Anta Sy	32 – 14 May 1975
F	12	Awa Doumbia	28 – 8 August 1979	1.82 m (6 ft 0 in)
C	13	Ndeye Ndiaye	28 – 2 May 1979	1.89 m (6 ft 2 in)
C	14	Jeanne Senghor	25 – 26 September 1982	1.90 m (6 ft 3 in)
C	15	Bineta Diouf	28 – 13 November 1978	1.86 m (6 ft 1 in)

Head coach

- (Senegal) Maguette Diop

Assistant coach

Legend

- (C) Team captain
- Club field describes current club

=== Tunisia ===
Tunisia women's national basketball team – 2007 FIBA Africa Championship – 11th place roster
Players
Coaches

Pos.	No.	Name	Age – Date of birth	Height	Club	Ctr.
C	4	Mariem Ouertani	19 – 10 November 1987	1.88 m (6 ft 2 in)
F	5	Emna Jlida	19 – 25 March 1988	1.75 m (5 ft 9 in)
	6	Aida Soltani	24 – 14 July 1983
	7	Fatma Zagrouba	25 – 21 February 1982
	8	Maha Chelly	24 – 1 October 1982
	9	Thouraya Adsi	25 – 4 May 1982
	10	Rim Gannar	25 – 20 May 1982
	11	Fatma Barkallah	33 – 30 April 1974
	12	Wafa Zaghdoud	23 – 5 October 1983
	13	Mouna Khriji	30 – 29 December 1976
	14	Henda Chebli	26 – 28 February 1981
	15	Hela Msadek	17 – 23 November 1989

Head coach

Assistant coach

Legend

- (C) Team captain
- Club field describes current club

== Group B ==
=== Angola ===
Angola women's national basketball team – 2007 FIBA Africa Championship – Bronze Medal roster
Players
Coaches

Pos.	No.	Name	Age – Date of birth	Height	Club	Ctr.
PG	4	Maria Afonso (C)	39 – 9 February 1968	1.68 m (5 ft 6 in)	Primeiro de Agosto	(Angola)
F	5	Jacqueline Francisco	29 – 16 March 1978	1.83 m (6 ft 0 in)	Primeiro de Agosto	(Angola)
PG	6	Domitila Ventura	28 – 28 November 1978	1.63 m (5 ft 4 in)	Primeiro de Agosto	(Angola)
SF	7	Ângela Cardoso	28 – 9 April 1979	1.80 m (5 ft 11 in)	Primeiro de Agosto	(Angola)
G	8	Catarina Camufal	27 – 30 March 1980	1.67 m (5 ft 6 in)	Interclube	(Angola)
F	9	Sónia Guadalupe	22 – 15 September 1985	1.88 m (6 ft 2 in)	Primeiro de Agosto	(Angola)
PF	10	Irene Guerreiro	37 – 10 September 1970	1.72 m (5 ft 8 in)	Interclube	(Angola)
C	11	Indira José	22 – 1 March 1985	1.93 m (6 ft 4 in)	Interclube	(Angola)
SG	12	Astrida Vicente	28 – 6 October 1978	1.73 m (5 ft 8 in)	Primeiro de Agosto	(Angola)
SF	13	Ngiendula Filipe	25 – 20 May 1982	1.78 m (5 ft 10 in)	Interclube	(Angola)
PF	14	Ernestina Neto	27 – 6 November 1979	1.85 m (6 ft 1 in)	Primeiro de Agosto	(Angola)
SF	15	Nacissela Maurício	27 – 2 June 1980	1.88 m (6 ft 2 in)	Primeiro de Agosto	(Angola)

Head coach

- (Angola) Aníbal Moreira

Assistant coach

- (Angola) Elisa Pires

Legend

- (C) Team captain
- Club field describes current club

=== Cameroon ===
Cameroon women's national basketball team – 2007 FIBA Africa Championship – 6th place roster
Players
Coaches

Pos.	No.	Name	Age – Date of birth	Height	Club	Ctr.
	4	Marie Mbick	20 – 3 September 1987
	5	Priscilla Mbiandja	18 – 20 February 1989	1.73 m (5 ft 8 in)
	6	Astride Njiogap	19 – 23 August 1988	1.74 m (5 ft 9 in)
	7	Alice Jamen	21 – 27 November 1985
	8	Elisabeth Bouyom	20 – 31 March 1987
	9	Bella Minna	23 – 6 June 1984
	10	Belle Bedihoune	25 – 26 November 1981
	11	Carole Bapoo	21 – 1 April 1986
	12	Nadine Lissouck	21 – 28 June 1986
	13	Guylène Mongoué	19 – 1 January 1988
	14	Vivanne Djandjo	26 – 5 April 1981
	15	Françoise Tafen	20 – 23 November 1986

Head coach

Assistant coach

Legend

- (C) Team captain
- Club field describes current club

=== Cape Verde ===
Cape Verde women's national basketball team – 2007 FIBA Africa Championship – 9th place roster
Players
Coaches

Pos.	No.	Name	Age – Date of birth	Height	Club	Ctr.
	4	Jade Leitão	24 – 13 July 1983	1.80 m (5 ft 11 in)
C	5	Crispina Correia	31 – 5 November 1975	1.91 m (6 ft 3 in)
	6	Louisa da Conceição	32 – 7 December 1974
	7	Natália André	32 – 5 November 1974
	8	Rosângela Lopes	28 – 14 March 1979
	9	Kira Lopes	27 – 12 November 1979
	10	Letícia Oliveira	30 – 21 November 1976
	11	Yamili Cruz	19 – 1 September 1988
	12	Denise Fonseca	27 – 12 May 1980
	13	Anisa Silva	18 – 21 August 1989
	14	Maria da Costa	38 – 24 March 1969
	15	Carla Aires	24 – 3 October 1982

Head coach

- [[]]

Assistant coach

Legend

- (C) Team captain
- Club field describes current club

=== DR Congo ===
DR Congo women's national basketball team – 2007 FIBA Africa Championship – 7th place roster
Players
Coaches

Pos.	No.	Name	Age – Date of birth	Height	Club	Ctr.
	4	Mwadi Mabika	31 – 22 July 1976
	5	Tangama-Tshuina	30 – 30 June 1977
G	6	Armelie Kalonda	19 – 30 March 1988	1.72 m (5 ft 8 in)
F	7	Lisette Eyenga	20 – 6 September 1987	1.78 m (5 ft 10 in)
	8	Jeanine Kalombo	23 – 16 February 1984
	9	Blandine Muleka	24 – 8 May 1983
C	10	Marie Kitoko	21 – 8 April 1986	1.83 m (6 ft 0 in)
	11	Jolie Olingende	27 – 6 March 1980
	12	Rosada Ilda	26 – 29 August 1981
C	13	Mireille Tshiyoyo	18 – 25 November 1988	1.84 m (6 ft 0 in)
	14	Nelly Bopoli	28 – 16 July 1979
	15	Thethe Kazadi	24 – 13 September 1983

Head coach

Assistant coach

Legend

- (C) Team captain
- Club field describes current club

=== Kenya ===
Kenya women's national basketball team – 2007 FIBA Africa Championship – 12th place roster
Players
Coaches

Pos.	No.	Name	Age – Date of birth	Height	Club	Ctr.
	4	Betty Mjomba	22 – 30 August 1985
	5	Eunice Ouma	29 – 20 August 1978
	6	Cheryl Odula	22 – 19 January 1985
	7	Carolyne Aratoh	33 – 25 October 1973
	8	Angela Okoth	22 – 8 August 1985
	9	Moureen Amayo	22 – 6 July 1985
	10	Rebecca Omwando	24 – 12 October 1982
	11	Dorcas Anyango	29 – 26 May 1978
	12	Yvonne Odhiambo	19 – 26 February 1988
	13	Miriam Obwong	28 – 6 October 1978
	14	Caroline Achieng	31 – 7 September 1976
	15	Joyce Memba	34 – 7 November 1972

Head coach

Assistant coach

Legend

- (C) Team captain
- Club field describes current club

=== Nigeria ===
Nigeria women's national basketball team – 2007 FIBA Africa Championship – 5th place roster
Players
Coaches

Pos.	No.	Name	Age – Date of birth	Height	Club	Ctr.
	4	Nwamaka Adibeli	22 – 10 March 1985
	5	Safiatu Akanni	21 – 26 May 1986
	6	Chisaokwu Ononiwu	21 – 21 January 1986
	7	Oluchi Okorie	26 – 28 August 1981
	8	Funmilayo Ojelabi	22 – 25 January 1985
	9	Joyce Ekworomadu	21 – 6 August 1986
	10	Enjoli Izidor	27 – 16 January 1980
F	11	Mfon Udoka	31 – 16 June 1976	1.90 m (6 ft 3 in)
	12	Olayinka Sanni	21 – 21 August 1986
	13	Charity Szczechowiak	22 – 30 April 1985
	14	Priscilla Udeaja	23 – 29 June 1984
C	15	Ugo Oha	25 – 18 July 1982	1.93 m (6 ft 4 in)

Head coach

Assistant coach

Legend

- (C) Team captain
- Club field describes current club

== See also ==
- 2007 FIBA Africa Championship squads
