= Basketball at the 2007 All-Africa Games – Women's team rosters =

This article displays the rosters for the participating teams at the 2007 All-Africa Games (women's basketball tournament).

== Algeria ==
Algeria women's national basketball team – 2007 All-Africa Games – 6th place roster
Players
Coaches

Pos.	No.	Name	Age – Date of birth	Height	Club	Ctr.
	4	Samira Feragh	22 – 12 April 1985
	5	Nesrine Taïbi	19 – 28 June 1988
	6	Kenza Guerroumi	24 – 14 July 1983
	7	Nadia Isli	24 – 14 March 1983
	8	Rachida Belaidi	27 – 28 November 1979
	9	Anissa Lago	19 – 7 March 1988
	10	Amel Bouderra	18 – 26 March 1989
	11	Khadidja Aniba	27 – 30 October 1979
	12	Rima Brahim	22 – 27 May 1985
	13	Dounia Chermitti	25 – 7 December 1981
	14	Wahiba Aissani	28 – 2 January 1979
	15	Yasmina Chabi	29 – 21 December 1977

Head coach

Assistant coach

Legend

- (C) Team captain
- Club field describes current club

== Angola ==
Angola women's national basketball team – 2007 All-Africa Games – Bronze Medal roster
Players
Coaches

Pos.	No.	Name	Age – Date of birth	Height	Club	Ctr.
G	4	Catarina Camufal	27 – 30 March 1980	1.67 m (5 ft 6 in)	Interclube	(Angola)
F	5	Jaquelina Francisco	29 – 16 March 1978	1.83 m (6 ft 0 in)	Primeiro de Agosto	(Angola)
PG	6	Domitila Ventura	28 – 28 November 1978	1.63 m (5 ft 4 in)	Primeiro de Agosto	(Angola)
SF	7	Ângela Cardoso	28 – 9 April 1979	1.80 m (5 ft 11 in)	Primeiro de Agosto	(Angola)
	8	Isabel Francisco	27 – 21 July 1980
	9	Bárbara Guimarães	26 – 14 September 1980		Primeiro de Agosto	(Angola)
PF	10	Irene Guerreiro	36 – 10 September 1970	1.72 m (5 ft 8 in)	Interclube	(Angola)
	11	Luísa Tomás	24 – 24 March 1983			(Angola)
SG	12	Astrida Vicente	28 – 6 October 1978	1.73 m (5 ft 8 in)	Primeiro de Agosto	(Angola)
SF	13	Ngiendula Filipe	25 – 20 May 1982	1.78 m (5 ft 10 in)	Interclube	(Angola)
PG	14	Maria Afonso (C)	39 – 9 February 1968	1.68 m (5 ft 6 in)	Primeiro de Agosto	(Angola)
SF	15	Nacissela Maurício	27 – 2 June 1980	1.88 m (6 ft 2 in)	Primeiro de Agosto	(Angola)

Head coach

- (Angola) Aníbal Moreira

Assistant coach

- (Angola) Elisa Pires

Legend

- (C) Team captain
- Club field describes current club

== DR Congo ==
DR Congo women's national basketball team – 2007 All-Africa Games – 8th place roster
Players
Coaches

Pos.	No.	Name	Age – Date of birth	Height	Club	Ctr.
	4	Rosada Ilda	25 – 29 August 1981
	5	Tangama-Tshuina	30 – 30 June 1977
	6	Jeanine Kalombo	23 – 16 February 1984
F	7	Lisette Eyenga	19 – 6 September 1987	1.78 m (5 ft 10 in)
	8	Puati Ndandu	23 – 17 January 1984
	9	Nene Baketukila	24 – 25 December 1982
	11	Jolie Olingende	27 – 6 March 1980
	12	Pauline Nsimbo	25 – 9 January 1982
	13	Kikwiki Munono	27 – 30 July 1979
	14	Nelly Bopoli	28 – 16 July 1979
	15	Thethe Kazadi	23 – 13 September 1983

Head coach

Assistant coach

Legend

- (C) Team captain
- Club field describes current club

== Ivory Coast ==
Ivory Coast women's national basketball team – 2007 All-Africa Games – 9th place roster
Players
Coaches

Pos.	No.	Name	Age – Date of birth	Height	Club	Ctr.
	4	Stéphanie N'Garsanet	20 – 4 August 1986
	5	Mariama Kouyate	19 – 16 June 1988
	6	Mariam Gbane	25 – 16 April 1982
	7	Fatou Diabate	32 – 12 March 1975
	8	Brou N'Goran	20 – 4 May 1987
	9	Masouratou Youssouf	22 – 11 November 1984
	10	Edjime Djedjemel	18 – 29 October 1988	1.88 m (6 ft 2 in)
	11	Mariame Djouara	19 – 24 December 1987
G	12	Aïchata Diomande	23 – 17 July 1984	1.69 m (5 ft 7 in)
SG	13	Kani Kouyaté	16 – 8 August 1990	1.78 m (5 ft 10 in)
	14	Minata Fofana	21 – 22 March 1986
G	15	Assétou Kolga	19 – 24 April 1988	1.70 m (5 ft 7 in)

Head coach

Assistant coach

Legend

- (C) Team captain
- Club field describes current club

== Kenya ==
Kenya women's national basketball team – 2007 All-Africa Games – 5th place roster
Players
Coaches

Pos.	No.	Name	Age – Date of birth	Height	Club	Ctr.
	4	Marion Githegi	20 – 13 July 1987
	5	Eunice Ouma	28 – 20 August 1978
	6	Miriam Obwong	28 – 6 October 1978
	7	Gladys Wanyama	23 – 3 April 1984
	8	Hilda Luvandwa	22 – 18 May 1985
	9	Angela Luchivya	27 – 19 September 1979
	10	Lorriane Odhiambo	25 – 22 December 1981
	11	Dorcas Anyango	29 – 26 May 1978
	12	Rose Ouma	22 – 6 November 1984
	13	Josephine Otieno	23 – 28 August 1983
	14	Caroline Achieng	30 – 7 September 1976
	15	Joyce Memba	34 – 7 November 1972

Head coach

- (Kenya) Thomas Olumbo

Assistant coach

Legend

- (C) Team captain
- Club field describes current club

== Mali ==
Mali women's national basketball team – 2007 All-Africa Games – 10th place roster
Players
Coaches

Pos.	No.	Name	Age – Date of birth	Height	Club	Ctr.
G	4	Kadiatou Touré	24 – 18 January 1983	1.74 m (5 ft 9 in)
	5	Djénébou Damba	22 – 11 July 1985	1.67 m (5 ft 6 in)
	6	Adizatou Maiga	23 – 30 October 1983	1.72 m (5 ft 8 in)
	7	Laoudy Maiga	16 – 15 October 1990
	8	Aminata Seremé	23 – 1 January 1984	1.68 m (5 ft 6 in)
	9	Kadidiatou Drame	27 – 25 December 1979
	10	Kadiatou Kanoute	29 – 11 June 1978	1.78 m (5 ft 10 in)
	11	Fatoumata Sangare	25 – 25 August 1981
	12	Kadia Sacko	19 – 25 April 1988
	13	Djénébou Sidibe	19 – 20 May 1988
C	14	Aminata Sininta	21 – 23 December 1985	1.88 m (6 ft 2 in)
	15	Djénébou Sissoko	25 – 27 June 1982	1.84 m (6 ft 0 in)

Head coach

Assistant coach

Legend

- (C) Team captain
- Club field describes current club

== Mozambique ==
Mozambique women's national basketball team – 2007 All-Africa Games – 4th place roster
Players
Coaches

Pos.	No.	Name	Age – Date of birth	Height	Club	Ctr.
	4	Valerdina Manhonga	26 – 26 December 1980	1.68 m (5 ft 6 in)
	5	Deolinda Ngulela	26 – 18 April 1981	1.70 m (5 ft 7 in)
	6	Ana Azinheira	30 – 8 February 1977
	7	Ana Branquinho	27 – 2 February 1980
	8	Tânia Wachena	21 – 15 December 1985
	9	Nádia Rodrigues	27 – 8 April 1980
	10	Vaneza Júnior	20 – 7 September 1986
	11	Aleia Rachide	22 – 23 January 1985
	12	Anabela Cossa	21 – 7 April 1986	1.72 m (5 ft 8 in)
	13	Nica Gemo	24 – 2 December 1982
	14	Ondina Nhampossa	28 – 18 June 1979
C	15	Deolinda Gimo	19 – 15 August 1987	1.90 m (6 ft 3 in)

Head coach

- (Mozambique) Nazir Salé

Assistant coach

- (Mozambique) Simão Mataveia

Legend

- (C) Team captain
- Club field describes current club

== Nigeria ==
Nigeria women's national basketball team – 2007 All-Africa Games – Silver Medal roster
Players
Coaches

Pos.	No.	Name	Age – Date of birth	Height	Club	Ctr.
	4	Nwamaka Adibeli	22 – 10 March 1985
	5	Tamunomiete Whyte	19 – 28 May 1988
	6	Erdoo Angwe	20 – 19 March 1987
	7	Oluchi Okorie	25 – 28 August 1981
	8	Vivian Ewalefo	22 – 9 May 1985
	9	Joyce Ekworomadu	20 – 6 August 1986
	10	Enjoli Izidor	27 – 16 January 1980
F	11	Mfon Udoka	31 – 16 June 1976	1.90 m (6 ft 3 in)
	12	Olayinka Sanni	20 – 21 August 1986
	13	Charity Egenti	22 – 30 April 1985
	14	Priscilla Udeaja	23 – 29 June 1984
C	15	Ugo Oha	25 – 18 July 1982	1.93 m (6 ft 4 in)

Head coach

Assistant coach

Legend

- (C) Team captain
- Club field describes current club

== Senegal ==
Senegal women's national basketball team – 2007 All-Africa Games – Gold Medal roster
Players
Coaches

Pos.	No.	Name	Age – Date of birth	Height	Club	Ctr.
	4	Fatou Dieng	23 – 18 August 1983
	5	Mame Paye	27 – 30 July 1979
F	6	Awa Gueye	28 – 31 August 1978	1.82 m (6 ft 0 in)
	7	Ndèye Sène	19 – 18 January 1988
F	8	Mame Diodio Diouf	22 – 15 December 1984	1.75 m (5 ft 9 in)
PF	9	Salimata Diatta	26 – 14 April 1981	1.84 m (6 ft 0 in)
PF	10	Astou Traore	26 – 30 April 1981	1.81 m (5 ft 11 in)
	11	Anta Sy	32 – 14 May 1975
F	12	Awa Doumbia	27 – 8 August 1979	1.82 m (6 ft 0 in)
	13	Magatte Sarr	20 – 16 December 1986
C	14	Jeanne Senghor	24 – 26 September 1982	1.90 m (6 ft 3 in)
C	15	Bineta Diouf	28 – 13 November 1978	1.86 m (6 ft 1 in)

Head coach

- (Senegal) Maguette Diop

Assistant coach

Legend

- (C) Team captain
- Club field describes current club

== Tunisia ==
Tunisia women's national basketball team – 2007 All-Africa Games – 7th place roster
Players
Coaches

Pos.	No.	Name	Age – Date of birth	Height	Club	Ctr.
C	4	Mariem Ouertani	19 – 10 November 1987	1.88 m (6 ft 2 in)
F	5	Emna Jlida	19 – 25 March 1988	1.75 m (5 ft 9 in)
	6	Hela Msadek	17 – 23 November 1989
	7	Fatma Zagrouba	25 – 21 February 1982
	8	Maha Chelly	24 – 1 October 1982
	9	Thouraya Adsi	25 – 4 May 1982
	10	Rim Gannar	25 – 20 May 1982
	11	Fatma Barkallah	33 – 30 April 1974
	12	Wafa Zaghdoud	23 – 5 October 1983
	13	Mouna Khriji	30 – 29 December 1976
	14	Henda Chebli	26 – 28 February 1981
	15	Doniez Benaceur	18 – 20 April 1989

Head coach

Assistant coach

Legend

- (C) Team captain
- Club field describes current club

== Zimbabwe ==
Zimbabwe women's national basketball team – 2007 All-Africa Games – 11th place roster
Players
Coaches

Pos.	No.	Name	Age – Date of birth	Height	Club	Ctr.
	6	Gladys Phiri	25 – 15 September 1981
G	5	Margaret Magwaro	23 – 30 October 1983	1.62 m (5 ft 4 in)
SF	6	Fadzai Masaba	24 – 7 May 1983	1.73 m (5 ft 8 in)
	7	Alice Mandivheyi	22 – 8 February 1985
	8	Helina Nyagato	26 – 7 June 1981
	9	Vimbayi Muhoma	32 – 25 November 1974
	10	Charity Chigumba	21 – 8 June 1986
	11	Charity Mucucuti	23 – 9 November 1983
	12	Juliet Misihairabwi	21 – 7 June 1986
	13	Isobel Tengende	22 – 8 May 1985
	14	Sibongile Mkandla	20 – 13 December 1986
	15	Alexandra Maseko	17 – 5 September 1989

Head coach

Assistant coach

Legend

- (C) Team captain
- Club field describes current club

== See also ==
- 2007 FIBA Africa Championship for Women squads
