= Basketball at the 2007 All-Africa Games – Women's tournament =

Basketball at the 2007 All-Africa Games women's tournament
Tournament details
- Host country: Algeria
- Dates: July 12–22, 2007
- Teams: 10
- Venue: (in Algiers host cities)

Final positions
- Champions: Senegal (6th title)

Tournament statistics
- Top scorer: (Mali) Sininta 16.1
- Top rebounds: (Mali) Sissoko 13.3
- Top assists: (Senegal) MD.Diouf 13.3
- PPG (Team): Senegal 73.1
- RPG (Team): Nigeria 47
- APG (Team): Senegal 12

Official website
- All Africa Games: Tournament for Women 2007

The 2007 edition of the women's basketball tournament of the African Games was the 9th, organized by FIBA Africa and played under the auspices of FIBA, the basketball sport governing body. The tournament was held from 12 to 22 July 2007 in Algiers, Algeria, contested by 11 national teams and won by Senegal, who defeated Nigeria 60–46 in the final to win their sixth title.

== Draw ==
Group A	Group B
Algeria; Angola; DR Congo; Ivory Coast; Mozambique	Kenya; Mali; Nigeria; Senegal; Tunisia; Zimbabwe

== Preliminary round ==
Times given below are in UTC+1.

=== Group A ===
Qualified for the quarter-finals

Team	W	L	PF	PA	Diff	Pts.
Angola	3	1	210	201	+9	7
Mozambique	3	1	225	181	+44	7
Algeria	2	2	213	225	-12	6
DR Congo	2	2	222	219	+3	6
Ivory Coast	0	4	187	231	-44	4

12 July 2007
09:00

Boxscore

Ivory Coast	39–63	Mozambique
Scoring by quarter: 13-18, 9-17, 7-15, 10-13
Pts: Djouara 13; Rebs: Youssouf, Kouyate 4 Asts: four players 1		Pts: Azinheira 11; Rebs: N.Gemo 10; Asts: Aleia 3

Salle Bentifour, Hydra, Algiers

12 July 2007
16:00

Boxscore

Angola	58–74	DR Congo
Scoring by quarter: 14-9, 9-17, 20-21, 15-17
Pts: Irene 15; Rebs: Nacissela, Bárbara 7 Asts: 0		Pts: Nsimbo 23; Rebs: Eyenga 9 Asts: three players 1

Salle Bentifour, Hydra, Algiers

13 July 2007
09:00

Boxscore

Ivory Coast	39–51	Angola
Scoring by quarter: 7-7, 9-12, 10-19, 13-13
Pts: Djouara 15; Rebs: Youssouf 6 Asts: Youssouf, Diomande 1		Pts: Nacissela 14; Rebs: Nacissela 11; Asts: Manú 2

Salle Bentifour, Hydra, Algiers

13 July 2007
16:00

Boxscore

Algeria	46–56	Mozambique
Scoring by quarter: 11-17, 10-10, 9-12, 16-17
Pts: Belaidi 10; Rebs: Chabi 12; Asts: Belaidi 2		Pts: Azinheira 18; Rebs: Ngulela, A.Cossa 8 Asts: Ngulela 3

Salle Bentifour, Hydra, Algiers

14 July 2007
14:00

Boxscore

Mozambique	46–48	Angola
Scoring by quarter: 3-13, 15-8, 16-13, 12-14
Pts: Gimo 11; Rebs: Vaneza 6 Asts: Vaneza, Nádia 1		Pts: Irene 20; Rebs: Nacissela 5 Asts: Nacissela, Ângela 1

Salle Bentifour, Hydra, Algiers

14 July 2007
16:00

Boxscore

Algeria	56–52	DR Congo
Scoring by quarter: 10-13, 18-9, 16-14, 12-16
Pts: Belaidi 14; Rebs: Brahim 8 Asts: Bouderra 4		Pts: Nsimbo, Olingende 10; Rebs: Nsimbo 14; Asts: Ida 2

Salle Bentifour, Hydra, Algiers

16 July 2007
16:00

Boxscore

Ivory Coast	64–69	Algeria
Scoring by quarter: 22-19, 14-15, 9-17, 19-18
Pts: Djouara 20; Rebs: Diabate 13; Asts: three players 2		Pts: Guerroumi 16; Rebs: Feragh, Chabi 7 Asts: Bouderra 5

Salle Bentifour, Hydra, Algiers

16 July 2007
18:00

Boxscore

DR Congo	48–60	Mozambique
Scoring by quarter: 6-12, 12-14, 19-17, 11-17
Pts: Ida 13; Rebs: Bopoli 8 Asts: Tshuina 2		Pts: Azinheira 16; Rebs: N.Gemo 8 Asts: Ngulela 3

Salle Bentifour, Hydra, Algiers

17 July 2007
11:00

Boxscore

DR Congo	48–45	Ivory Coast
Scoring by quarter: 13-12, 11-4, 10-22, 14-7
Pts: Bopoli, Nsimbo 12; Rebs: Bopoli 10; Asts: Ndandu 3		Pts: Djouara 20; Rebs: Diabate 9 Asts: Djouara, Youssouf 2

Salle Bentifour, Hydra, Algiers

17 July 2007
16:00

Boxscore

Algeria	42–53	Angola
Scoring by quarter: 12-13, 9-14, 13-16, 8-10
Pts: Aissani 12; Rebs: Feragh, Brahim 7 Asts: Belaidi 5		Pts: Nacissela 14; Rebs: Nacissela 9 Asts: I.Francisco 2

Salle Bentifour, Hydra, Algiers

=== Group B ===
Qualified for the quarter-finals

Team	W	L	PF	PA	Diff	Pts.
Nigeria	5	0	329	273	+56	10
Senegal	4	1	379	259	+120	9
Kenya	3	2	293	302	-9	8
Tunisia	2	3	308	312	-4	7
Mali	1	4	304	329	-25	6
Zimbabwe	0	5	292	430	-138	5

12 July 2007
11:00

Boxscore

Kenya	58–56	Tunisia
Scoring by quarter: 11-19, 14-11, 27-14, 6-12
Pts: R.Ouma 15; Rebs: Odhiambo 9 Asts: Achieng 4		Pts: Adsi 12; Rebs: Adsi 10; Asts: Barkallah 2

Salle Bentifour, Hydra, Algiers

12 July 2007
14:00

Boxscore

Zimbabwe	55–85	Nigeria
Scoring by quarter: 12-23, 7-19, 19-17, 17-26
Pts: Mucucuti, Nyagato 14; Rebs: Mucucuti, Mkandla 6 Asts: three players 1		Pts: Oha 18; Rebs: Oha, Udoka 6 Asts: Okorie 2

Salle Bentifour, Hydra, Algiers

12 July 2007
18:00

Boxscore

Mali	56–94	Senegal
Scoring by quarter: 16-32, 11-27, 12-21, 17-14
Pts: Sissoko 13; Rebs: Sissoko 12; Asts: Sininta 3		Pts: Traore 16; Rebs: Traore 8 Asts: MD.Diouf 5

Salle Bentifour, Hydra, Algiers

13 July 2007
11:00

Boxscore

Senegal	75–37	Zimbabwe
Scoring by quarter: 19-11, 18-2, 22-15, 16-9
Pts: Diouf 17; Rebs: Senghor 8 Asts: MD.Diouf 5		Pts: Mkandla 11; Rebs: Mkandla 10; Asts: Magwaro, Mandivheyi 1

Salle Bentifour, Hydra, Algiers

13 July 2007
14:00

Boxscore

Kenya	58–52	Mali
Scoring by quarter: 18-12, 12-13, 16-6, 12-21
Pts: Wanyama 15; Rebs: Odhiambo 6 Asts: Achieng 4		Pts: Sininta 16; Rebs: Sissoko 11; Asts: A.Maiga 2

Salle Bentifour, Hydra, Algiers

13 July 2007
18:00

Boxscore

Nigeria	56–54	Tunisia
Scoring by quarter: 12-10, 7-12, 17-16, 20-16
Pts: Ekworomadu 21; Rebs: three players 7 Asts: Ekworomadu 2		Pts: Adsi 12; Rebs: Chebli 9 Asts: Barkallah 3

Salle Bentifour, Hydra, Algiers

14 July 2007
09:00

Boxscore

Zimbabwe	68–81	Kenya
Scoring by quarter: 13-27, 18-14, 14-26, 23-14
Pts: Mabasa 24; Rebs: Mkandla 11; Asts: Mabasa 2		Pts: Wanyama 18; Rebs: Wanyama 9 Asts: R.Ouma 3

Salle Bentifour, Hydra, Algiers

14 July 2007
11:00

Boxscore

Tunisia	51–50	Mali
Scoring by quarter: 14-14, 13-19, 11-7, 13-10
Pts: Chebli 11; Rebs: Adsi 8 Asts: Khriji, Gannar 1		Pts: Sininta 15; Rebs: Sininta 18; Asts: 0

Salle Bentifour, Hydra, Algiers

14 July 2007
18:00

Boxscore

Nigeria	66–64	Senegal
Scoring by quarter: 15-10, 10-18, 20-17, 21-19
Pts: Udoka 28; Rebs: three players 6 Asts: Udoka, Ekworomadu 3		Pts: Traore 16; Rebs: B.Diouf 5 Asts: Diatta 6

Salle Bentifour, Hydra, Algiers

16 July 2007
09:00

Boxscore

Mali	97–61	Zimbabwe
Scoring by quarter: 25-15, 26-14, 22-13, 24-19
Pts: Sininta 29; Rebs: Sininta 21; Asts: Sininta 4		Pts: Mabasa 18; Rebs: Mkandla 10; Asts: three players 1

Salle Bentifour, Hydra, Algiers

16 July 2007
11:00

Boxscore

Kenya	51–57	Nigeria
Scoring by quarter: 15-15, 7-22, 13-12, 16-8
Pts: R.Ouma 12; Rebs: Otieno, Achieng 7 Asts: E.Ouma 3		Pts: Udoka, Udeaja 14; Rebs: Udoka, Udeaja 9 Asts: Sanni 3

Salle Bentifour, Hydra, Algiers

16 July 2007
14:00

Boxscore

Senegal	77–55	Tunisia
Scoring by quarter: 22-16, 17-13, 16-13, 22-13
Pts: B.Diouf 22; Rebs: B.Diouf 10; Asts: MD.Diouf 3		Pts: Zagrouba 13; Rebs: Jlida 5 Asts: Zagrouba, Chelly 2

Salle Bentifour, Hydra, Algiers

17 July 2007
09:00

Boxscore

Senegal	69–45	Kenya
Scoring by quarter: 14-12, 18-11, 21-6, 16-16
Pts: Traore 17; Rebs: Sarr 6 Asts: Dieng 5		Pts: Otieno 12; Rebs: Otieno 7 Asts: R.Ouma, Luvandwa 2

Salle Bentifour, Hydra, Algiers

17 July 2007
14:00

Boxscore

Tunisia	92–71	Zimbabwe
Scoring by quarter: 20-8, 27-17, 22-19, 23-27
Pts: Khriji 29; Rebs: Barkallah, Chebli 7 Asts: Barkallah 4		Pts: Tengende 17; Rebs: Mkandla 17; Asts: Magwaro, Mandivheyi 3

Salle Bentifour, Hydra, Algiers

17 July 2007
18:00

Boxscore

Nigeria	65–49	Mali
Scoring by quarter: 25-7, 18-19, 9-7, 13-16
Pts: Okorie 12; Rebs: Egenti 11; Asts: Ekworomadu, Whyte 3		Pts: Kanoute 18; Rebs: Sissoko 21; Asts: three players 2

Salle Bentifour, Hydra, Algiers

== Knockout stage ==
=== Championship bracket ===
Quarter-finals
19 July 2007 - 13:00
Angola	72
Tunisia	47
19 July 2007 - 15:00
Nigeria	52
DR Congo	35
19 July 2007 - 17:00
Senegal	75
Algeria	49
19 July 2007 - 19:00
Mozambique	82
Kenya	62

Semi-finals
20 July 2007 - 16:00
Senegal	71
Angola	49
20 July 2007 - 18:00
Nigeria	57
Mozambique	46

Final
22 July 2007 - 16:00
Senegal	60
Nigeria	46
Third place
21 July 2007 - 18:00
Angola	53
Mozambique	43

=== Quarterfinals ===
19 July 2007
13:00

Boxscore

Tunisia	47–72	Angola
Scoring by quarter: 17-21, 12-19, 10-15, 8-17
Pts: Khriji 19; Rebs: Chebli 6 Asts: Zagrouba 3		Pts: Astrida 14; Rebs: Astrida, Nacissela 6 Asts: three players 3

Salle Bentifour, Hydra, Algiers

15:00

Boxscore

DR Congo	35–52	Nigeria
Scoring by quarter: 11-16, 11-6, 6-16, 7-14
Pts: Nsimbo 8 Rebs: Bopoli 8 Asts: Olingende 1		Pts: Ekworomadu, Oha 10; Rebs: Udoka 16; Asts: Ekworomadu, Udoka 3

Salle Bentifour, Hydra, Algiers

17:00

Boxscore

Algeria	49–75	Senegal
Scoring by quarter: 7-13, 12-13, 13-20, 17-29
Pts: Guerroumi 11; Rebs: Feragh 8 Asts: Aissani 3		Pts: Traore 18; Rebs: Doumbia 9 Asts: B.Diouf 3

Salle Bentifour, Hydra, Algiers

19:00

Boxscore

Kenya	62–82	Mozambique
Scoring by quarter: 24-20, 9-24, 12-31, 17-7
Pts: Otieno 15; Rebs: Otieno 5 Asts: Wanyama, Achieng 1		Pts: Azinheira 19; Rebs: Azinheira, Aleia 4 Asts: Ngulela, Nádia 3

Salle Bentifour, Hydra, Algiers

=== Semifinals ===
20 July 2007
16:00

Boxscore

Angola	49–71	Senegal
Scoring by quarter: 16-18, 6-12, 9-13, 18-28
Pts: Irene 12; Rebs: Nacissela 11; Asts: three players 1		Pts: MD.Diouf 17; Rebs: Senghor 9 Asts: MD.Diouf, Diatta 4

Salle Bentifour, Hydra, Algiers

18:00

Boxscore

Nigeria	57–46	Mozambique
Scoring by quarter: 12-13, 15-10, 18-10, 12-13
Pts: Sanni 13; Rebs: Udoka 12; Asts: Izidor 4		Pts: Gimo, Aleia 11; Rebs: three players 5 Asts: Ngulela 2

Salle Bentifour, Hydra, Algiers

=== Bronze medal match ===
21 July 2007
18:00

Boxscore

Angola	53–43	Mozambique
Scoring by quarter: 13-9, 11-11, 9-9, 20-14
Pts: Astrida 14; Rebs: Manú 9 Asts: Astrida 2		Pts: Azinheira 13; Rebs: Azinheira 9 Asts: Nádia 2

Salle Bentifour, Hydra, Algiers

=== Final ===
22 July 2007
16:00

Boxscore

Senegal	60–46	Nigeria
Scoring by quarter: 13-15, 24-13, 8-9, 15-9
Pts: Senghor 13; Rebs: MD.Diouf, Traore 8 Asts: Diakhate 5		Pts: Sanni 15; Rebs: Udoka 11; Asts: Sanni, Ekworomadu 2

Salle Harcha, Algiers

=== 5–8th place bracket ===
Semi-finals
20 July 2007 - 09:00
Algeria	66
Tunisia	56
20 July 2007 - 11:00
Kenya	65
DR Congo	64

5th place
21 July 2007 - 16:00
Kenya	78
Algeria	67
7th place
21 July 2007 - 14:00
Tunisia	75
DR Congo	67

=== 5–8th place classification ===
20 July 2007
09:00

Boxscore

Tunisia	56–66	Algeria
Scoring by quarter: 13-18, 13-11, 17-13, 13-24
Pts: Barkallah 16; Rebs: Gannar 8 Asts: Chelly 2		Pts: Aissani 23; Rebs: Feragh 10; Asts: Bouderra 4

Salle Bentifour, Hydra, Algiers

11:00

Boxscore

DR Congo	64–65	Kenya
Scoring by quarter: 10-15, 21-17, 20-15, 13-18
Pts: Nsimbo 15; Rebs: Olingende 8 Asts: Ida 2		Pts: Wanyama 14; Rebs: Otieno 10; Asts: E.Ouma 4

Salle Bentifour, Hydra, Algiers

=== 7th place match ===
21 July 2007
14:00

Boxscore

Tunisia	75–67	DR Congo
Scoring by quarter: 21-21, 20-7, 21-23, 13-16
Pts: Chelly 17; Rebs: Chebli 6 Asts: Chebli 4		Pts: Ida 14; Rebs: Bopoli 17; Asts: Tshuina 6

Salle Bentifour, Hydra, Algiers

=== 5th place match ===
21 July 2007
16:00

Boxscore

Algeria	67–78	Kenya
Scoring by quarter: 18-13, 14-13, 16-29, 19-23
Pts: Guerroumi 23; Rebs: Brahim 8 Asts: Bouderra 3		Pts: Otieno 18; Rebs: Otieno 14; Asts: Luchivya 4

Salle Bentifour, Hydra, Algiers

=== 9th place match ===
19 July 2007
09:00

Boxscore

Ivory Coast	70–60	Mali
Scoring by quarter: 16-13, 9-13, 28-15, 17-19
Pts: Diomande 19; Rebs: Diabate 8 Asts: Youssouf 3		Pts: Sissoko 18; Rebs: Sininta 13; Asts: Seremé 2

Staouéli, Algiers

== Final standings ==
Rank	Team	Record
1st place, gold medalist(s)	Senegal	7–1
2nd place, silver medalist(s)	Nigeria	7–1
3rd place, bronze medalist(s)	Angola	5–2
4	Mozambique	4–3
5	Kenya	5–3
6	Algeria	3–4
7	Tunisia	3–5
8	DR Congo	2–5
9	Ivory Coast	1–4
10	Mali	1–5
11	Zimbabwe	0–5

1st	2nd	3rd
Senegal Adama Diakhaté; Anta Sy; Astou Traoré; Awa Doumbia; Bineta Diouf; Fatou Dieng; Jeanne Senghor; Magatte Sarr; Mame Diodio Diouf; Mame Paye; Ndèye Séne; Salimata Diatta; Coach: Maguette Diop	Nigeria Charity Egenti; Enjoli Izidor; Erdoo Angwe; Joyce Ekworomadu; Mfon Udoka; Nwamaka Adibeli; Olayinka Sanni; Oluchi Okorie; Priscilla Udeaja; Tamunomiete Whyte; Ugochukwu Oha; Vivian Ewalefo; Coach:	Angola Ângela Cardoso; Astrida Vicente; Bárbara Guimarães; Catarina Camufal; Domitila Ventura; Irene Guerreiro; Isabel Francisco; Jaquelina Francisco; Luísa Tomás; Maria Afonso; Nacissela Maurício; Ngiendula Filipe; Coach:

== Awards ==
2007 All-Africa Games Women's Basketball winner

Senegal
Sixth title

== Statistical leaders ==
=== Individual Tournament Highs ===
Points per Game

Rank	Name	G	Pts	PPG
1	(Mali) Aminata Sininta	6	97	16.1
2	(Senegal) Astou Traore	8	120	15
3	(Ivory Coast) Mariame Djouara	5	73	14.6
4	(Zimbabwe) Fadzai Masaba	5	66	13.2
5	(Democratic Republic of the Congo) Pauline Nsimbo	7	90	12.8
6	(Angola) Irene Guerreiro	7	89	12.7
7	(Mozambique) Ana Azinheira	7	87	12.4
8	(Kenya) Gladys Wanyama	8	99	12.3
9	(Kenya) Josephine Otieno	8	94	11.7
10				

Rebounds

Rank	Name	G	Rbs	RPG
1	(Mali) Djénébou Sissoko	6	80	13.3
2	(Mali) Aminata Sininta	6	74	12.3
3	(Zimbabwe) Sibongile Mkandla	5	54	10.8
4	(Democratic Republic of the Congo) Nelly Bopoli	7	66	9.4
5	(Nigeria) Mfon Udoka	8	67	8.3
6	(Angola) Nacissela Maurício	7	58	8.2
7	(Kenya) Josephine Otieno	8	59	7.3
8	(Democratic Republic of the Congo) Pauline Nsimbo	7	50	7.1
9	(Algeria) Samira Feragh	7	48	6.8
9	(Democratic Republic of the Congo) Jolie Olingende	7	48	6.8

Assists

Rank	Name	G	Ast	APG
1	(Senegal) Mame Diodio Diouf	8	24	3
2	(Algeria) Amel Bouderra	7	20	2.8
3	(Algeria) Rachida Belaidi	7	18	2.5
4	(Senegal) Salimata Diatta	8	16	2
5	(Nigeria) Joyce Ekworomadu	8	15	1.8
6	(Mozambique) Deolinda Ngulela	7	13	1.8
7	(Mali) Aminata Sininta	6	10	1.6
8	(Kenya) Caroline Achieng	8	13	1.6
8	(Tunisia) Fatma Barkallah	8	13	1.6
10	(Ivory Coast) Masouratou Youssouf	5	8	1.6

2-point field goal percentage

Rank	Name	G	A	M	2P%
1	(Senegal) Astou Traore	8	62	43	69.3
2	(Kenya) Josephine Otieno	8	59	37	62.7
3	(Mozambique) Ana Azinheira	7	52	30	57.6
4	(Senegal) Adama Diakhate	8	55	31	56.3
5	(Kenya) Gladys Wanyama	8	81	40	49.3
6	(Zimbabwe) Helina Nyagato	5	40	19	47.5
7	(Nigeria) Olayinka Sanni	8	53	25	47.1
8	(Nigeria) Mfon Udoka	8	49	23	46.9
9	Rosada Ida	7	47	22	46.8
10	(Ivory Coast) Mariame Djouara	5	48	22	45.8

3-point field goal percentage

Rank	Name	G	A	M	3P%
1	(Ivory Coast) Mariame Djouara	5	15	7	46.6
2	(Tunisia) Maha Chelly	7	30	13	43.3
3	(Nigeria) Mfon Udoka	8	33	11	33.3
4	(Senegal) Awa Doumbia	8	30	10	33.3
5	(Kenya) Eunice Ouma	8	18	6	33.3
6	(Ivory Coast) Aïchata Diomande	5	26	8	30.7
7	(Mali) Kadiatou Kanoute	6	26	8	30.7
8	(Angola) Irene Guerreiro	7	51	15	29.4
9	(Nigeria) Enjoli Izidor	8	28	8	28.5
10	(Tunisia) Mouna Khriji	8	32	9	28.1

Free throw percentage

Rank	Name	G	A	M	FT%
1	(Angola) Irene Guerreiro	7	27	22	81.4
2	(Kenya) Gladys Wanyama	8	24	19	79.1
3	(Senegal) Astou Traore	8	46	34	73.9
4	(Algeria) Amel Bouderra	7	31	22	70.9
5	(Kenya) Rouse Ouma	8	33	23	69.6
6	(Zimbabwe) Fadzai Mabasa	5	39	27	69.2
7	(Tunisia) Thouraya Adsi	8	25	17	68
8	(Mozambique) Deolinda Gimo	7	34	23	67.6
9	(Algeria) Wahiba Aissani	7	21	14	66.6
10	(Mali) Djénébou Sissoko	6	29	19	65.5

=== Team Tournament Highs ===
Points per Game

Rank	Name	G	Pts	PPG
1	Senegal	8	585	73.1
2	Kenya	8	498	62.2
3	Tunisia	8	486	60.7
4	Mali	6	364	60.6
5	Nigeria	8	484	60.5
6	Zimbabwe	5	292	58.4
7	Mozambique	7	396	56.5
8	Algeria	7	395	56.4
9	DR Congo	7	388	55.4
10	Angola	7	384	54.8

Rebounds

Rank	Name	G	Rbs	RPG
1	Nigeria	8	376	47
2	DR Congo	7	293	41.8
3	Mali	6	247	41.1
4	Kenya	8	281	40.1
5	Mozambique	7	278	39.7
6	Angola	7	273	39
7	Zimbabwe	5	193	38.6
8	Ivory Coast	5	186	37.2
9	Algeria	7	259	37
10	Senegal	8	278	34.7

Assists

Rank	Name	G	Ast	APG
1	Senegal	8	96	12
2	Nigeria	8	70	8.7
3	Algeria	7	57	8.1
4	Kenya	8	60	7.5
5	Tunisia	8	60	7.5
6	Mozambique	7	48	6.8
7	Ivory Coast	5	33	6.6
8	Mali	6	35	5.8
9	Angola	7	35	5
10	DR Congo	7	30	4.2

2-point field goal percentage

Rank	Name	G	A	M	2P%
1	Senegal	8	382	188	49.2
2	Tunisia	8	301	142	47.1
3	Kenya	8	327	151	46.1
4	Nigeria	8	344	149	43.3
5	DR Congo	7	332	130	39.1
6	Zimbabwe	5	243	94	38.6
7	Mali	6	284	109	38.3
8	Mozambique	7	258	99	38.3
9	Ivory Coast	5	222	81	36.4
10	Angola	7	245	88	35.9

3-point field goal percentage

Rank	Name	G	A	M	3P%
1	Nigeria	8	132	35	26.5
2	Senegal	8	110	29	26.3
3	Ivory Coast	5	69	18	26
4	Tunisia	8	147	37	25.1
5	Mozambique	7	115	28	24.3
6	Angola	7	159	36	22.6
7	Algeria	7	177	37	20.9
8	Kenya	8	97	20	20.6
9	Mali	6	100	19	19
10	DR Congo	7	81	10	12.3

Free throw percentage

Rank	Name	G	A	M	FT%
1	Senegal	8	181	122	67.4
2	Angola	7	158	100	63.2
3	Kenya	8	225	136	60.4
4	Mozambique	7	201	114	56.7
5	Mali	6	164	89	54.2
6	Nigeria	8	153	81	52.9
7	Zimbabwe	5	181	95	52.4
8	Algeria	7	190	98	51.5
9	DR Congo	7	197	98	49.7
10	Tunisia	7	187	91	48.6

== See also ==
2007 FIBA Africa Championship for Women
