= 2007 FIBA Africa Championship for Women =

2007 FIBA Women's AfroBasket
18th FIBA Women's African Basketball Championship

Tournament details
- Host country: Senegal
- Dates: September 20 - September 30
- Teams: 12
- Venues: 2 (in 2 host cities)

Final positions
- Champions: Mali (1st title)

Tournament statistics
- MVP: (Mali) Hamchétou Maïga
- Top scorer: (Cape Verde) Crispina 18.1
- Top rebounds: (Egypt) Diawara 8.8
- Top assists: (Madagascar) Ange 4.9
- PPG (Team): Mali 72.8
- RPG (Team): Nigeria 43.6
- APG (Team): Nigeria 18

Official website
- 2007 FIBA Africa Championship for Women

The 2007 FIBA Africa Championship for Women was the 18th FIBA Africa Championship for Women, played under the rules of FIBA, the world governing body for basketball, and the FIBA Africa thereof. The tournament was hosted by Senegal from September 20 to 30, with the games played at the Marius Ndiaye Stadium in Dakar and at the Stade Maniang Soumaré in Thiès.

Mali defeated Senegal 65–58 in the final to win their first title. and securing a spot at the 2008 Summer Olympics.

== Draw ==
Group A	Group B
Ivory Coast; Madagascar; Mali; Mozambique; Senegal; Tunisia	Angola; Cameroon; Cape Verde; DR Congo; Kenya; Nigeria

== Preliminary round ==
Times given below are in UTC.

=== Group A ===
Qualified for the quarter-finals

Team	Pts.	W	L	PCT	PF	PA	Diff
Senegal	10	5	0	1.000	327	195	+132
Mali	9	4	1	0.800	376	224	+152
Mozambique	8	3	2	0.600	307	274	+33
Ivory Coast	7	2	3	0.400	230	295	-65
Tunisia	6	1	4	0.200	256	323	-67
Madagascar	5	0	5	0.000	216	401	-185

September 20
17:00

Boxscore

Senegal	62–37	Ivory Coast
Scoring by quarter: 19-6, 14-14, 10-12, 19-5
Pts: As.Traoré 12; Rebs: Senghor 7 Asts: Diakhate, Diouf 4		Pts: A.Kolga 11; Rebs: K.Kouyaté 6 Asts: Gbane 2

Marius Ndiaye Stadium, Dakar

September 21
17:00

Boxscore

Madagascar	49–83	Mozambique
Scoring by quarter: 11-23, 6-8, 17-17, 15-35
Pts: Lydia 14; Rebs: Ange 5 Asts: Ange 4		Pts: Carla 17; Rebs: Nica, Valerdina 6 Asts: Nádia, Rute 3

Marius Ndiaye Stadium, Dakar

September 21
14:30

Boxscore

Mali	93–49	Tunisia
Scoring by quarter: 26-13, 21-11, 18-4, 28-21
Pts: Diawara 18; Rebs: Coulibaly 10; Asts: Maïga Ba, Bagayoko 3		Pts: Chelly 16; Rebs: Soltani 6 Asts: Soltani 3

Marius Ndiaye Stadium, Dakar

September 22
14:30

Boxscore

Ivory Coast	46–67	Mozambique
Scoring by quarter: 15-23, 11-13, 8-23, 12-8
Pts: K.Kouyaté 12; Rebs: Youssouf 7 Asts: K.Kouyaté 3		Pts: Carla 21; Rebs: Iracema 7 Asts: Ngulela 5

Marius Ndiaye Stadium, Dakar

September 22
17.00

Boxscore

Mali	108–47	Madagascar
Scoring by quarter: 30-15, 29-5, 16-19, 33-8
Pts: Bagayoko 18; Rebs: five players 9 Asts: Bagayoko 7		Pts: Prisca 16; Rebs: Prisca 7 Asts: Lalatiana 2

Marius Ndiaye Stadium, Dakar

September 22
20:30

Boxscore

Tunisia	43–58	Senegal
Scoring by quarter: 11-6, 7-14, 14-22, 11-16
Pts: Chelly 10; Rebs: Khriji, Adsi 5 Asts: Chelly 2		Pts: Gueye 15; Rebs: A.Traore 10; Asts: Diakhate 4

Marius Ndiaye Stadium, Dakar

September 23
14:30

Boxscore

Tunisia	59–41	Madagascar
Scoring by quarter: 10-15, 11-9, 13-8, 25-9
Pts: Adsi, Barkallah 9 Rebs: Zaghdoud 7 Asts: Barkallah 4		Pts: Ange 12; Rebs: Nahirae 7 Asts: Ange 4

Marius Ndiaye Stadium, Dakar

September 23
17:00

Boxscore

Ivory Coast	34–74	Mali
Scoring by quarter: 11-19, 8-18, 4-17, 11-20
Pts: A.Kolga 9 Rebs: Youssouf, Djedjemel 7 Asts: Youssouf, K.Kouyaté 2		Pts: Maïga Ba 15; Rebs: Coulibaly 10; Asts: Maïga Ba, Diawara 3

Marius Ndiaye Stadium, Dakar

September 23
20:30

Boxscore

Senegal	59–42	Mozambique
Scoring by quarter: 17-9, 15-18, 16-6, 11-9
Pts: A.Traoré 15; Rebs: A.Traoré 9 Asts: Diouf, Marie Sy 3		Pts: Carla 17; Rebs: Clarisse 7 Asts: Ngulela 3

Marius Ndiaye Stadium, Dakar

September 24
14.30

Boxscore

Mozambique	46–64	Mali
Scoring by quarter: 12-14, 20-18, 6-22, 8-10
Pts: Clarisse 12; Rebs: Carla, Aleia 6 Asts: Ngulela 3		Pts: Diawara 19; Rebs: Diawara 20; Asts: Maïga Ba 6

Marius Ndiaye Stadium, Dakar

September 25
17.00

Boxscore

Tunisia	49–62	Ivory Coast
Scoring by quarter: 11-16, 10-14, 11-17, 17-15
Pts: Chelly, Zaghdoud 8 Rebs: Adsi 9 Asts: Khriji, Chebli 3		Pts: K.Kouyaté 14; Rebs: K.Kouyaté, Youssouf 6 Asts: Diomande 4

Marius Ndiaye Stadium, Dakar

September 24
20.30

Boxscore

Senegal	100–36	Madagascar
Scoring by quarter: 28-6, 31-8, 24-15, 17-7
Pts: A.Traoré, As.Traoré 21; Rebs: N.Ndiaye 7 Asts: A.Traoré 5		Pts: Lydia 10; Rebs: three players 3 Asts: Lydia, Ange 2

Marius Ndiaye Stadium, Dakar

September 26
14.30

Boxscore

Madagascar	43–51	Ivory Coast
Scoring by quarter: 5-6, 18-10, 11-22, 9-13
Pts: Ange 16; Rebs: Lalatiana 6 Asts: Ange 4		Pts: K.Kouyaté 17; Rebs: Kone 10; Asts: Kone 3

Marius Ndiaye Stadium, Dakar

September 26
17.00

Boxscore

Mozambique	69–56	Tunisia
Scoring by quarter: 22-17, 9-12, 18-22, 20-15
Pts: Carla 15; Rebs: Clarisse, Gimo 7 Asts: Ngulela 5		Pts: Chebli, Ouertani 11; Rebs: Chebli 9 Asts: Ouertani, Khriji 3

Marius Ndiaye Stadium, Dakar

September 26
20.30

[ Boxscore]

Mali	37–48	Senegal
Scoring by quarter: 10-11, 6-14, 14-12, 7-11
Pts: Maïga Ba 17; Rebs: Sininta 8 Asts: Maïga Ba 3		Pts: Balayara 10; Rebs: A.Traoré, N.Ndiaye 8 Asts: Diatta, B.Diouf 3

Marius Ndiaye Stadium, Dakar

=== Group B ===
Qualified for the quarter-finals

Team	Pts.	W	L	PCT	PF	PA	Diff
Angola	9	4	1	0.800	286	227	+59
Nigeria	9	4	1	0.800	320	268	+52
Cameroon	8	3	2	0.600	251	271	-20
DR Congo	8	3	2	0.600	316	249	+67
Kenya	6	1	4	0.200	258	304	-46
Cape Verde	5	0	5	0.000	235	347	-112

September 21
20:30

Boxscore

Cape Verde	42–84	DR Congo
Scoring by quarter: 6-21, 11-18, 14-20, 11-25
Pts: Jade 19; Rebs: three players 7 Asts: Jade 4		Pts: Tshuina 20; Rebs: Olingende 10; Asts: Olingende 8

Stade Maniang Soumaré, Thiès

September 21
17:00

Kenya	44–62	Angola
Scoring by quarter: n/a
Pts: n/a		Pts: n/a

Stade Maniang Soumaré, Thiès

September 21
14:30

Boxscore

Nigeria	61–35	Cameroon
Scoring by quarter: 22-12, 8-4, 19-11, 12-8
Pts: Udoka 10; Rebs: Udoka 9 Asts: Ekworomadu, Akanni 5		Pts: Bedihoune 11; Rebs: Jamen 8 Asts: Bedihoune, Jamen 2

Stade Maniang Soumaré, Thiès

September 22
14:30

Boxscore

Angola	53–42	Nigeria
Scoring by quarter: 17-11, 10-4, 11-15, 15-12
Pts: Irene 11; Rebs: Manú 8 Asts: three players 4		Pts: Udoka 9 Rebs: Sanni 6 Asts: Ekworomadu 3

Stade Maniang Soumaré, Thiès

September 22
17:00

Boxscore

Cameroon	54–52	DR Congo
Scoring by quarter: 8-12, 13-17, 16-13, 17-10
Pts: Bedihoune 18; Rebs: Jamen 9 Asts: Mbiandja 12		Pts: Mabika, Kalonda 11; Rebs: Olingende 8 Asts: Ilda 7

Stade Maniang Soumaré, Thiès

September 22
20:30

Boxscore

Kenya	57–48	Cape Verde
Scoring by quarter: 11-19, 14-10, 14-2, 18-17
Pts: Obwong, Anyango 10; Rebs: Achieng 10; Asts: Obwong		Pts: Jade 22; Rebs: Crispina 7 Asts: Jade 4

Stade Maniang Soumaré, Thiès

September 23
17:00

Boxscore

Nigeria	69–56	DR Congo
Scoring by quarter: 22-8, 13-21, 16-14, 18-13
Pts: Ononiwu 18; Rebs: Oha, Sanni 13; Asts: Izidor, Ekworomadu 4		Pts: Bopoli 14; Rebs: Bopoli 9 Asts: Kalonda 8

Stade Maniang Soumaré, Thiès

September 23
20:30

Boxscore

Cameroon	59–55	Kenya
Scoring by quarter: 19-15, 17-10, 12-14, 11-16
Pts: Bedihoune 24; Rebs: Djandjo 9 Asts: Bedihoune 5		Pts: Memba 14; Rebs: Achieng 8 Asts: Ouma 5

Stade Maniang Soumaré, Thiès

September 23
14:30

Boxscore

Angola	66–41	Cape Verde
Scoring by quarter: 21-6, 12-6, 8-19, 25-10
Pts: Ernestina 15; Rebs: Jacqueline 8 Asts: Jacqueline 8		Pts: Crispina 20; Rebs: Crispina 8 Asts: three players 3

Stade Maniang Soumaré, Thiès

September 24
17:00

Boxscore

Angola	63–38	Cameroon
Pts: Irene 19; Rebs: Manú 7 Asts: Catarina 4		Pts: Djandjo 8 Rebs: Mbiandja 6 Asts: Njiogap 3

Stade Maniang Soumaré, Thiès

September 25
14:30

Boxscore

DR Congo	62–42	Kenya
Scoring by quarter: 16-8, 17-10, 15-11, 14-13
Pts: Tshuina 19; Rebs: Bopoli 11; Asts: Ilda 9		Pts: Obwong 12; Rebs: Achieng 9 Asts: three players 2

Stade Maniang Soumaré, Thiès

September 25
20:30

Boxscore

Nigeria	75–54	Cape Verde
Scoring by quarter: 25-9, 20-16, 9-11, 21-18
Pts: Szczechowiak 16; Rebs: Oha 11; Asts: Izidor 5		Pts: Crispina 16; Rebs: Crispina, Jade 7 Asts: Louisa, Natália 4

Stade Maniang Soumaré, Thiès

September 26
14.30

Boxscore

Kenya	60–73	Nigeria
Scoring by quarter: 15-32, 8-11, 13-11, 24-19
Pts: Achieng 18; Rebs: Odhiambo 6 Asts: Ouma 6		Pts: Sanni 13; Rebs: Szczechowiak 11; Asts: Izidor, Akanni 4

Stade Maniang Soumaré, Thiès

September 26
17.00

Boxscore

Cape Verde	40–65	Cameroon
Scoring by quarter: 10-14, 12-15, 10-23, 8-13
Pts: Crispina 14; Rebs: Crispina 4 Asts: Natália 3		Pts: Bedihoune 14; Rebs: Bedihoune 6 Asts: Jamen 7

Stade Maniang Soumaré, Thiès

September 26
20:30

Boxscore

DR Congo	52–42	Angola
Scoring by quarter: 16-7, 8-9, 17-15, 11-11
Pts: Kalonda 19; Rebs: Bopoli 7 Asts: Kalonda 7		Pts: Ngiendula 11; Rebs: Ngiendula 9 Asts: Catarina 7

Stade Maniang Soumaré, Thiès

== Knockout stage ==
=== 9-12th place bracket ===
Semi-finals
September 29
Cape Verde	79
Tunisia	72
September 29
Madagascar	69
Kenya	58

Ninth place
September 30
Cape Verde	60
Madagascar	57
Eleventh place
September 30
Tunisia	72
Kenya	60

=== 9-12th place ===
September 28
14:30

Boxscore

Cape Verde	79–72	Tunisia
Scoring by quarter: 12-13, 22-15, 19-18, 26-26
Pts: Crispina 32; Rebs: Crispina 10; Asts: Crispina 9		Pts: Adsi, Khriji 12; Rebs: Khriji 7 Asts: three players 4

Stade Maniang Soumaré, Thiès

September 28
17:00

Boxscore

Madagascar	69–58	Kenya
Scoring by quarter: 9-9, 23-10, 15-22, 22-17
Pts: Ange 27; Rebs: Nirina 10; Asts: Ange, Nirina 6		Pts: Obwong 18; Rebs: Obwong 13; Asts: Achieng 5

Stade Maniang Soumaré, Thiès

=== 11th place match ===
September 29
14:30

Boxscore

Tunisia	72–60	Kenya
Scoring by quarter: 20-16, 17-11, 11-16, 24-17
Pts: Zaghdoud 12; Rebs: Adsi 6 Asts: Chelly, Jlida 4		Pts: Obwong 17; Rebs: Achieng, Memba 8 Asts: Ouma 9

Stade Maniang Soumaré, Thiès

=== 9th place match ===
September 29
17:00

Boxscore

Cape Verde	60–57	Madagascar
Scoring by quarter: 13-13, 8-12, 22-10, 17-22
Pts: Crispina 28; Rebs: Crispina, Louisa 10; Asts: Crispina, M.Costa 4		Pts: Ange 19; Rebs: Lydia 9 Asts: Ange 12

Stade Maniang Soumaré, Thiès

=== 5th place bracket ===
Semi-finals
September 29
Nigeria	72
DR Congo	61
September 29
Cameroon	50
Ivory Coast	47

Fifth place
September 30
Nigeria	63
Cameroon	50
Seventh place
September 30
DR Congo	53
Ivory Coast	43

=== 5-8th place ===
September 29
12:00

Boxscore

DR Congo	61–72	Nigeria
Scoring by quarter: 9-16, 13-16, 25-16, 14-24
Pts: Bopoli, Kalonda 13; Rebs: Bopoli 8 Asts: Ilda 3		Pts: Oha 18; Rebs: Oha 9 Asts: Akanni 6

Marius Ndiaye Stadium, Dakar

September 29
14:30

Boxscore

Ivory Coast	47–50	Cameroon
Scoring by quarter: 11-16, 8-5, 19-12, 9-17
Pts: A.Kolga 14; Rebs: Gbane 8 Asts: Diomande 3		Pts: Bedihoune 14; Rebs: Bedihoune, Jamen 7 Asts: Bedihoune 3

Marius Ndiaye Stadium, Dakar

=== 7th place match ===
September 30
9:00

Boxscore

DR Congo	53–43	Ivory Coast
Scoring by quarter: 4-13, 12-10, 15-9, 22-11
Pts: Olingende 13; Rebs: Kitoko 8 Asts: Bopoli, Ilda 2		Pts: M.Kolga, Diomande 11; Rebs: Youssouf 6 Asts: Youssouf 2

Marius Ndiaye Stadium, Dakar

=== 5th place match ===
September 30
11:30

Boxscore

Nigeria	63–50	Cameroon
Scoring by quarter: 15-15, 16-12, 17-16, 15-7
Pts: Szczechowiak 14; Rebs: Szczechowiak 13; Asts: Sanni 7		Pts: Bedihoune 11; Rebs: Bedihoune 10; Asts: Mbiandja 7

Marius Ndiaye Stadium, Dakar

=== Championship bracket ===
Quarter-finals
September 28, 2007
Senegal	76
DR Congo	49
September 28, 2007
Nigeria	61
Mozambique	69
September 28, 2007
Angola	44
Ivory Coast	42
September 28, 2007
Cameroon	41
Mali	72

Semi-finals
September 29, 2007
Senegal	63
Mozambique	48
September 29, 2007
Angola	60
Mali	69

Final
September 30, 2007
Senegal	58
Mali	65
Third place
September 30, 2007
Mozambique	58
Angola	73

=== Quarterfinals ===
September 28
12:00

Boxscore

Ivory Coast	42–44	Angola
Scoring by quarter: 7-16, 12-8, 11-11, 12-9
Pts: K.Kouyaté 13; Rebs: three players 5 Asts: Youssouf, A.Kolga 2		Pts: Manú 17; Rebs: Manú 6 Asts: Nacissela 4

Marius Ndiaye Stadium, Dakar

September 28
14:30

Boxscore

Cameroon	41–72	Mali
Scoring by quarter: 8-11, 10-20, 10-25, 13-16
Pts: Mbiandja 11; Rebs: Jamen 9 Asts: Njiogap 5		Pts: Coulibaly 14; Rebs: Coulibaly 10; Asts: Bagayoko 6

Marius Ndiaye Stadium, Dakar

September 28
17:00

Boxscore

Mozambique	69–61	Nigeria
Scoring by quarter: 17-14, 15-16, 22-14, 15-17
Pts: Carla 28; Rebs: Gimo 9 Asts: Ngulela 8		Pts: Sanni 17; Rebs: Sanni 9 Asts: Ononiwu 2

Marius Ndiaye Stadium, Dakar

September 28
20:30

Boxscore

DR Congo	49–76	Senegal
Scoring by quarter: 12-26, 17-20, 7-11, 13-19
Pts: Kalonda 10; Rebs: Kitoko 9 Asts: Kalonda 2		Pts: A.Traore 20; Rebs: Anta Sy 6 Asts: Diatta 5

Marius Ndiaye Stadium, Dakar

=== Semifinals ===
September 29
17:00

Boxscore

Senegal	63–48	Mozambique
Scoring by quarter: 15-12, 16-10, 19-18, 13-8
Pts: A.Traoré 12; Rebs: N.Ndiaye 10; Asts: D.Diouf 6		Pts: Nádia 9 Rebs: Clarisse 7 Asts: Ngulela 2

Marius Ndiaye Stadium, Dakar

September 29
20:30

Boxscore

Angola	60–69	Mali
Scoring by quarter: 16-17, 13-16, 10-23, 21-13
Pts: Nacissela 20; Rebs: Astrida 6 Asts: Domitila 6		Pts: Coulibaly 18; Rebs: Coulibaly 15; Asts: Kanoute, Sininta 4

Marius Ndiaye Stadium, Dakar

=== Bronze medal match ===
September 30
14:00

Boxscore

Mozambique	58–73	Angola
Scoring by quarter: 8-12, 13-22, 21-15, 16-24
Pts: Ngulela 12; Rebs: Clarisse 7 Asts: Clarisse 5		Pts: Astrida 20; Rebs: Nacissela 16; Asts: Domitila 5

Marius Ndiaye Stadium, Dakar

=== Final ===
September 30
17:30

Boxscore

Senegal	58–65	Mali
Scoring by quarter: 8-18, 14-13, 14-16, 22-18
Pts: A.Traoré 12; Rebs: five players 3 Asts: D.Diouf 5		Pts: Maïga Ba 29; Rebs: Diawara 11; Asts: Maïga Ba 3

Marius Ndiaye Stadium, Dakar

== Final standings ==
Qualified for the 2008 Summer Olympics
Qualified for the 2008 Olympic Qualifying Tournament

Rank	Team	Record
Gold medal	Mali	7–1
Silver medal	Senegal	7–1
Bronze medal	Angola	6–2
4	Mozambique	4–4
5	Nigeria	6–2
6	Cameroon	4–4
7	DR Congo	4–4
8	Ivory Coast	2–6
9	Cape Verde	2–5
10	Madagascar	1–6
11	Tunisia	2–5
12	Kenya	1–6

Mali roster
Adizatou Maiga, Aminata Sininta, Djene Diawara, Fanta Toure, Fatoumata Bagayoko, Haoua Sangare, Hamchétou Maïga, Kadia Sacko, Kadia Touré, Kadiatou Kanoute, Naignouma Coulibaly, Nare Diawara, Coach:

== Awards ==
2007 FIBA Africa Championship for Women winners

Mali
First title

Most Valuable Player
(Mali) Hamchétou Maïga

=== All-Tournament Team ===
- (Mali) Hamchétou Maïga
- (Cape Verde) Crispina Correia
- (Mali) Djene Diawara
- (Mozambique) Carla Silva
- (Senegal) Aya Traoré

== Statistical leaders ==
=== Individual Tournament Highs ===
Points

Rank	Name	G	Pts	PPG
1	(Cape Verde) Crispina Correia	7	127	18.1
2	(Cape Verde) Jade Leitão	7	112	16
3	(Mali) Hamchétou Maïga	8	120	15
4	(Mozambique) Carla Silva	8	116	14.5
5	(Madagascar) Ange Rasoambolanoro	7	101	14.4
6	(Senegal) Aya Traoré	8	101	12.6
7	(Cameroon) Belle Bedihoune	8	100	12.5
8	(Mozambique) Clarisse Machanguana	6	69	11.5
9	(Angola) Irene Guerreiro	8	91	11.4
10	(Mali) Djene Diawara	8	89	11.1

Rebounds

Rank	Name	G	Rbs	RPG
1	(Mali) Djene Diawara	8	70	8.8
2	(Mali) Naignouma Coulibaly	8	66	8.2
3	(Nigeria) Olayinka Sanni	8	60	7.5
4	(Cape Verde) Crispina Correia	7	52	7.4
5	(Democratic Republic of the Congo) Nelly Bopoli	8	55	6.9
5	(Nigeria) Ugo Oha	8	55	6.9
7	(Kenya) Caroline Achieng	7	48	6.9
8	(Cameroon) Alice Jamen	8	53	6.6
9	(Nigeria) Priscilla Udeaja	8	52	6.5
10	(Cameroon) Belle Bedihoune	8	51	6.4

Assists

Rank	Name	G	Ast	APG
1	(Madagascar) Ange Rasoambolanoro	7	34	4.9
2	(Kenya) Eunice Ouma	7	29	4.1
3	(Cameroon) Priscilla Mbiandja	8	30	3.8
4	(Democratic Republic of the Congo) Armelie Kalonda	7	26	3.7
5	(Angola) Domitila Ventura	8	29	3.6
5	(Mozambique) Deolinda Ngulela	8	29	3.6
5	(Democratic Republic of the Congo) Rosada Ilda	8	29	3.6
8	(Cape Verde) Jade Leitão	7	25	3.6
9	(Angola) Catarina Camufal	8	27	3.4
9	(Senegal) Mame Diodio Diouf	8	27	3.4

Steals

Rank	Name	G	Stl	SPG
1	(Kenya) Caroline Achieng	7	21	3
2	(Democratic Republic of the Congo) Rosada Ilda	8	19	2.4
2	(Mali) Hamchétou Maïga	8	19	2.4
4	(Democratic Republic of the Congo) Armelie Kalonda	7	14	2
5	(Madagascar) Ange Rasoambolanoro	7	13	1.9
6	(Senegal) Mame Diodio Diouf	8	14	1.8
6	(Ivory Coast) Masouratou Youssouf	8	14	1.8
6	(Ivory Coast) Kani Kouyaté	8	14	1.8
6	(Senegal) Aya Traoré	8	14	1.8
10	(Kenya) Joyce Memba	7	12	1.7

Blocks

Rank	Name	G	Blk	BPG
1	(Nigeria) Ugo Oha	8	11	1.4
2	(Mali) Djene Diawara	8	9	1.1
3	(Nigeria) Enjoli Izidor	8	8	1
4	(Cape Verde) Crispina Correia	7	6	0.9
5	(Ivory Coast) Masouratou Youssouf	8	6	0.8
5	(Cameroon) Belle Bedihoune	8	6	0.8
5	(Senegal) Ndeye Ndiaye	8	6	0.8
5	(Mali) Aminata Sininta	8	6	0.8
5	(Senegal) Anta Sy	8	6	0.8
5	(Nigeria) Charity Szczechowiak	8	6	0.8

Minutes

Rank	Name	G	Min	MPG
1	(Cape Verde) Jade Leitão	7	261	37.3
2	(Cape Verde) Natália André	7	242	34.6
3	(Cameroon) Belle Bedihoune	8	275	34.4
4	(Madagascar) Ange Rasoambolanoro	7	236	33.7
5	(Cape Verde) Crispina Correia	7	233	33.3
6	(Kenya) Caroline Achieng	7	230	32.9
7	(Mali) Hamchétou Maïga	8	256	32
7	(Cameroon) Priscilla Mbiandja	8	256	32
9	(Ivory Coast) Priscilla Mbiandja	8	247	30.9
10	(Tunisia) Henda Chebli	7	209	29.9

=== Individual Game Highs ===
Department	Name	Total	Opponent
Points	(Cape Verde) Crispina Correia	32	Tunisia
Rebounds	(Mali) Djene Diawara	20	Mozambique
Assists	(Cameroon) Priscilla Mbiandja (Madagascar) Ange Rasoambolanoro	12	DR Congo; Cape Verde
Steals	(Democratic Republic of the Congo) Rosada Ilda	7	Angola
Blocks	(Cape Verde) Crispina Correia (Mali) Nare Diawara (Mali) Nare Diawara (Nigeria) Ugo Oha (Nigeria) Ugo Oha (Tunisia) Wafa Zaghdoud	3	Madagascar; Madagascar; Mozambique; Kenya; DR Congo; Kenya
2-point field goal percentage	(Nigeria) Ugo Oha	100% (7/7)	DR Congo
3-point field goal percentage	(Mozambique) Carla Silva	100% (5/5)	Ivory Coast
Free throw percentage	(Senegal) Astou Traoré	100% (9/9)	Madagascar
Turnovers	(Nigeria) Chisaokwu Ononiwu	9	DR Congo

=== Team Tournament Highs ===
Points per Game

Pos.	Name	PPG
1	Mali	72.8
2	Senegal	65.5
3	Nigeria	64.5
4	Mozambique	60.3
5	DR Congo	58.6
6	Angola	57.9
7	Tunisia	57.1
8	Kenya	53.7
9	Cape Verde	52
10	Cameroon	49

Total Points

Pos.	Name	PPG
1	Mali	582
2	Senegal	524
3	Nigeria	516
4	Mozambique	482
5	DR Congo	469
6	Angola	463
7	Tunisia	400
8	Cameroon	392
9	Kenya	376
10	Cape Verde	364

Rebounds

Pos.	Name	RPG
1	Nigeria	43.6
2	Mali	36.8
3	Kenya	36.6
4	Senegal	36.5
5	Cameroon	36
6	DR Congo	35.4
7	Angola	33.2
8	Cape Verde	31.7
9	Tunisia	29.1
10	Mozambique	28.8

Assists

Pos.	Name	APG
1	Nigeria	18
2	Angola	17.1
3	DR Congo	16.6
4	Kenya	16.6
5	Cape Verde	15.9
6	Cameroon	15.3
7	Senegal	14.9
8	Mali	13.6
9	Tunisia	12.6
10	Madagascar	12.4

Steals

Pos.	Name	SPG
1	Kenya	12.1
2	DR Congo	10
3	Senegal	9.6
4	Tunisia	9.1
5	Mali	8.1
6	Nigeria	8
7	Angola	7
8	Mozambique	7
9	Ivory Coast	6.5
10	Cape Verde	5.9

Blocks

Pos.	Name	BPG
1	Nigeria	4.1
2	Mali	3.4
3	Senegal	2.4
4	Cape Verde	2.4
5	Angola	1.8
6	Tunisia	1.7
7	Cameroon	1.6
8	DR Congo	1.4
9	Madagascar	1.4
10	Ivory Coast	1.2

2-point field goal percentage

Pos.	Name	%
1	Mali	52.3
2	Senegal	43.8
3	Tunisia	41.9
4	Madagascar	41.8
5	Mozambique	41.6
6	Nigeria	40.7
7	Angola	40
8	Ivory Coast	39
9	DR Congo	38.2
10	Cape Verde	34.4

3-point field goal percentage

Pos.	Name	%
1	Mali	33.3
2	Mozambique	32.9
3	Angola	30.1
4	Nigeria	29.9
5	Cameroon	28.9
6	Kenya	27.5
7	Senegal	26.4
8	Tunisia	25.7
9	DR Congo	25.7
10	Cape Verde	24.3

Free throw percentage

Pos.	Name	%
1	Senegal	71.3
2	Nigeria	65.6
3	Angola	62.5
4	Madagascar	62.5
5	Cape Verde	62
6	Mali	58.8
7	Mozambique	55.4
8	Ivory Coast	52.4
9	Tunisia	50.9
10	Kenya	50.6

=== Team Game highs ===
Department	Name	Total	Opponent
Points	Mali	108	Madagascar
Rebounds	Nigeria	65	DR Congo
Assists	Angola	31	Cape Verde
Steals	Senegal	17	Madagascar
Blocks	Mali	8	Madagascar
2-point field goal percentage	Mozambique	64.7% (22/34)	Madagascar
3-point field goal percentage	DR Congo	66.7% (6/9)	Cape Verde
Free throw percentage	Senegal	89.7% (26/29)	Madagascar
Turnovers	Cape Verde	35	DR Congo

== See also ==
- 2007 FIBA Africa Women's Clubs Champions Cup
