= 2007 FIBA Africa Women's Clubs Champions Cup squads =

This article displays the rosters for the participating teams at the 2007 FIBA Africa Club Championship for Women.

== (Ivory Coast) Abidjan Basket Club ==
Abidjan Basket Club – 2007 FIBA Africa Women's Clubs Champions Cup – 5th place roster
Players							Coaches
Pos	#	Nat	Name	Height	Weight	Age	Head Coach
	5	(Ivory Coast)	Souko Thiam			4 March 1988 (aged 19)	Benga Lemore
	6	(Ivory Coast)	Mariam Gbane			16 April 1982 (aged 25)
	7	(Ivory Coast)	Adjheï Abbady			17 June 1987 (aged 20)	Assistant coach(es)
	8	(Ivory Coast)	Ramatou Kone			8 June 1981 (aged 26)
	9	(Ivory Coast)	Salimata Berte			7 May 1989 (aged 18)
	10	(Democratic Republic of the Congo)	Nsuda Benga			27 November 1975 (aged 31)
	11	(Ivory Coast)	Kadidiatou Drame			25 December 1979 (aged 27)
G	12	(Ivory Coast)	Aïchata Diomande	1.69 m (5 ft 6 1/2 in)		17 July 1984 (aged 23)
	13	(Ivory Coast)	Adjoua Kouadio			13 October 1981 (aged 26)
	14	(Ivory Coast)	Brou N'Goran			4 May 1987 (aged 20)
	15	(Guinea)	Fatoumata Camara			16 July 1980 (aged 27)

== (Democratic Republic of the Congo) Arc-en-Ciel ==
Arc-en-Ciel – 2007 FIBA Africa Women's Clubs Champions Cup – 9th place roster
Players							Coaches
Pos	#	Nat	Name	Height	Weight	Age	Head Coach
	4	(Democratic Republic of the Congo)	Rukonkish Kamin			25 December 1979 (aged 27)	Jean-Marie Samuna
	5	(Democratic Republic of the Congo)	Puati Ndandu			17 January 1984 (aged 23)
	6	(Democratic Republic of the Congo)	Jeanine Kalombo			16 February 1984 (aged 23)	Assistant coach(es)
	7	(Democratic Republic of the Congo)	Caty Muna			12 November 1988 (aged 18)
	8	(Democratic Republic of the Congo)	Ilanga Tshitshi			14 April 1977 (aged 30)
F	9	(Democratic Republic of the Congo)	Diane Mabibi	1.77 m (5 ft 9 1/2 in)		28 November 1988 (aged 18)
	10	(Democratic Republic of the Congo)	Nathalie Kabeya			8 August 1985 (aged 22)
C	11	(Democratic Republic of the Congo)	Mireille Tshiyoyo	1.84 m (6 ft 1/2 in)		25 November 1988 (aged 18)
	12	(Democratic Republic of the Congo)	Ntumba Bilonda			5 November 1982 (aged 24)
	13	(Democratic Republic of the Congo)	Irene Nyama			28 November 1969 (aged 37)
	14	(Democratic Republic of the Congo)	Ginette Makiese			20 April 1988 (aged 19)
	15	(Democratic Republic of the Congo)	Micheline Ngobe			18 September 1978 (aged 29)

== (Mozambique) Desportivo de Maputo ==
Desportivo de Maputo – 2007 FIBA Africa Women's Clubs Champions Cup – Gold medal roster
Players							Coaches
Pos	#	Nat	Name	Height	Weight	Age	Head Coach
	4	(Mozambique)	Josefina Jafar			26 September 1986 (aged 21)	(Mozambique) Nazir Salé
	5	(Senegal)	Anta Sy			14 May 1975 (aged 32)
	6	(Senegal)	Salimata Diatta			14 April 1981 (aged 26)	Assistant coach(es)
	7	(Mozambique)	Valerdina Manhonga			26 December 1980 (aged 26)
	8	(Mozambique)	Anabela Cossa			7 April 1986 (aged 21)
	9	(Mozambique)	Cátia Halar			28 November 1982 (aged 24)
	10	(Mozambique)	Diara Dessai			27 August 1977 (aged 30)
	11	(Mozambique)	Luisa Nhate			9 January 1984 (aged 23)
	12	(Mozambique)	Crichúlia Monjane			28 August 1983 (aged 24)
	13	(Mozambique)	Nádia Rodrigues			8 April 1980 (aged 27)
	14	(Mozambique)	Odélia Mafanela			14 April 1989 (aged 18)
	15	(Mozambique)	Sílvia Neves			17 February 1987 (aged 20)

== (Mali) Djoliba ==
Djoliba – 2007 FIBA Africa Women's Clubs Champions Cup – 6th place roster
Players							Coaches
Pos	#	Nat	Name	Height	Weight	Age	Head Coach
	4	(Mali)	Nassira Traore			28 October 1988 (aged 19)	[[]]
	5	(Senegal)	Adja Ba			9 August 1975 (aged 32)
	6	(Mali)	Fatoumata Dia			26 January 1985 (aged 22)	Assistant coach(es)
	7	(Mali)	Kama Dembélé			8 October 1988 (aged 19)
G	8	(Mali)	Aminata Seremé	1.68 m (5 ft 6 in)		1 January 1984 (aged 23)
	9	(Senegal)	Ndeye Mbengue			28 November 1978 (aged 28)
	10	(Mali)	Mama Traore			15 August 1989 (aged 18)
	11	(Mali)	Fatoumata Sacko			22 May 1980 (aged 27)
	12	(Mali)	Djenaba Samake			22 August 1985 (aged 22)
	13	(Mali)	Djenebou Sacko			12 June 1990 (aged 17)
C	14	(Mali)	Aminata Sininta	1.85 m (6 ft 1 in)		23 December 1985 (aged 21)
	15	(Mali)	Minata Keita			15 March 1989 (aged 18)

== (Nigeria) Dolphins ==
Dolphins – 2007 FIBA Africa Women's Clubs Champions Cup – 10th place roster
Players							Coaches
Pos	#	Nat	Name	Height	Weight	Age	Head Coach
	4	(Nigeria)	Tokunbo Olaosebikan			27 January 1991 (aged 16)	(Nigeria) Wale Aboderin
	5	(Nigeria)	Ochunko Okworogun			3 July 1985 (aged 22)
	6	(Nigeria)	Nkechi Akashili			22 February 1990 (aged 17)	Assistant coach(es)
	7	(Nigeria)	Nkoyo George			30 April 1989 (aged 18)
	8	(Nigeria)	Esther Igben			1 April 1988 (aged 19)
	9	(Nigeria)	Odonsi Rebecca Iritei			25 June 1986 (aged 21)
	10	(Nigeria)	Patricia Chukwuma			18 March 1985 (aged 22)
	11	(Nigeria)	Tinuke Arowosafe			25 September 1990 (aged 17)
	12	(Nigeria)	Peace Aliyu			22 November 1986 (aged 20)
	13	(Nigeria)	Julie Onyelugo			30 September 1987 (aged 20)
	14	(Nigeria)	Juliana Fuludu			26 April 1988 (aged 19)
F	15	(Nigeria)	Rashidat Sadiq	1.88 m (6 ft 2 in)		3 January 1981 (aged 26)

== (Mozambique) Ferroviário de Maputo ==
Ferroviário de Maputo – 2007 FIBA Africa Women's Clubs Champions Cup – Bronze medal roster
Players							Coaches
Pos	#	Nat	Name	Height	Weight	Age	Head Coach
	4	(United States)	Stephanie Faulkner			8 February 1977 (aged 30)	(Mozambique) Carlos Aik
	6	(Mozambique)	Zinóbia Machanguana			4 March 1977 (aged 30)
	7	(Mozambique)	Rute Muianga			6 April 1983 (aged 24)	Assistant coach(es)
	8	(Mozambique)	Janet Monteiro			2 February 1987 (aged 20)
	9	(Mozambique)	Tatiana Ismael			4 March 1988 (aged 19)
	10	(Mozambique)	Carla Silva			12 March 1978 (aged 29)
	11	(Mozambique)	Júlia Machalela			15 December 1975 (aged 31)
	12	(Mozambique)	Monica Naltner			20 October 1984 (aged 23)
	13	(Mozambique)	Deolinda Gimo			15 August 1987 (aged 20)
	14	(Mozambique)	Nádia Zucule			15 February 1987 (aged 20)
	15	(Mozambique)	Ondina Nhampossa			18 June 1979 (aged 28)

== (Nigeria) First Bank ==
First Bank – 2007 FIBA Africa Women's Clubs Champions Cup – 7th place roster
Players							Coaches
Pos	#	Nat	Name	Height	Weight	Age	Head Coach
	4	(Nigeria)	Bintu Bhadmus			10 November 1985 (aged 21)	(Nigeria) Adewunmi Aderemi
	5	(Nigeria)	Nwamaka Adibeli			10 March 1985 (aged 22)
	6	(Nigeria)	Tamunomiete Whyte			28 May 1988 (aged 19)	Assistant coach(es)
	7	(United States)	Greeba Barlow			17 May 1982 (aged 25)
	8	(Nigeria)	Funmilayo Ojelabi			25 January 1985 (aged 22)
	9	(Nigeria)	Erdoo Angwe			19 March 1987 (aged 20)
	10	(Nigeria)	Sandra German			20 July 1984 (aged 23)
	11	(Nigeria)	Adenike Dawdu			9 November 1984 (aged 22)
	12	(Nigeria)	Martha Imoh			21 December 1989 (aged 17)
	13	(Nigeria)	Ezinne James			22 June 1985 (aged 22)
	14	(Nigeria)	Priscilla Udeaja			29 June 1984 (aged 23)
C	15	(Nigeria) (United States)	Ugochukwu Oha	1.93 m (6 ft 4 in)		18 July 1982 (aged 25)

== (Mozambique) ISPU ==
ISPU – 2007 FIBA Africa Women's Clubs Champions Cup – 4th place roster
Players							Coaches
Pos	#	Nat	Name	Height	Weight	Age	Head Coach
	4	(Mozambique)	Marta Gange			27 May 1984 (aged 23)	(Mozambique) Alexandre Mata
	5	(Mozambique)	Eduarda Chongo			3 September 1983 (aged 24)
	6	(Mozambique)	Tânia Wachena			15 December 1985 (aged 21)	Assistant coach(es)
	7	(Mozambique)	Ana Branquinho			2 February 1980 (aged 27)
	9	(Mozambique)	Ana Azinheira			8 February 1977 (aged 30)
	9	(Mozambique)	Amélia Macamo			23 September 1985 (aged 22)
	10	(Mozambique)	Vaneza Júnior			7 September 1986 (aged 21)
	11	(Mozambique)	Aleia Rachide			23 January 1985 (aged 22)
	12	(Mozambique)	Dulce Mahgaia			5 November 1988 (aged 18)
	13	(Mozambique)	Nádia Rosário			14 May 1986 (aged 21)
	14	(Mozambique)	Iracema Ndauane			19 October 1980 (aged 27)
	15	(Mozambique)	Cecília Henriques			24 August 1990 (aged 17)

== Kenya Ports Authority ==
Kenya Ports Authority – 2007 FIBA Africa Women's Clubs Champions Cup – 8th place roster
Players							Coaches
Pos	#	Nat	Name	Height	Weight	Age	Head Coach
	4	(Kenya)	Susan Anyango Okech			29 December 1982 (aged 24)	(Kenya) Sammy Wanjohi
	5	(Kenya)	Marcelline Mwazighe			10 October 1973 (aged 34)
	6	(Kenya)	Carolyne Aratoh			25 October 1973 (aged 34)	Assistant coach(es)
	7	(Kenya)	Mwajuma Makau			26 June 1980 (aged 27)
	8	(Kenya)	Everlyne Olang			2 April 1987 (aged 20)
	9	(Kenya)	Fadya Said			13 September 1980 (aged 27)
	10	(Kenya)	Irene Murambi			24 January 1978 (aged 29)
	11	(Kenya)	Dorcas Anyango			26 May 1978 (aged 29)
	12	(Kenya)	Yvonne Odhiambo			26 February 1988 (aged 19)
	13	(Kenya)	Winnie Odhek			18 July 1984 (aged 23)
	14	(Kenya)	Agnes Anyango			13 January 1978 (aged 29)
	15	(Kenya)	Miriam Obwong			6 October 1978 (aged 29)

== (Democratic Republic of the Congo) Lupopo ==
Lupopo – 2007 FIBA Africa Women's Clubs Champions Cup – 11th place roster
Players							Coaches
Pos	#	Nat	Name	Height	Weight	Age	Head Coach
	5	(Democratic Republic of the Congo)	Blandine Muleka			8 May 1983 (aged 24)	[[]]
	6	(Democratic Republic of the Congo)	Fisha Taka			2 May 1984 (aged 23)
	7	(Democratic Republic of the Congo)	Cipy Loota			17 September 1979 (aged 28)	Assistant coach(es)
	8	(Democratic Republic of the Congo)	Kibinda Ndangi			26 March 1978 (aged 29)
	9	(Democratic Republic of the Congo)	Floris Tshilombo			25 January 1990 (aged 17)
	10	(Democratic Republic of the Congo)	Nenette Baketukila			25 February 1986 (aged 21)
C	11	(Democratic Republic of the Congo)	Betty Tshiniangu	1.87 m (6 ft 1 1/2 in)		5 January 1987 (aged 20)
	12	(Democratic Republic of the Congo)	Laurence Odimba			4 April 1973 (aged 34)
	13	(Democratic Republic of the Congo)	Bibiche Kayembe			24 July 1983 (aged 24)
	14	(Democratic Republic of the Congo)	Kibinda Ndangi			26 March 1978 (aged 29)
	15	(Democratic Republic of the Congo)	Thethe Kazadi			13 September 1983 (aged 24)

== (Angola) Primeiro de Agosto ==
Primeiro de Agosto – 2007 FIBA Africa Women's Clubs Champions Cup – Silver medal roster
Players							Coaches
Pos	#	Nat	Name	Height	Weight	Age	Head Coach
	4	(Angola)	Maria Afonso			9 February 1968 (aged 39)	(Angola) Aníbal Moreira
	5	(Angola)	Luísa Miguel			13 June 1975 (aged 32)
	6	(Angola)	Domitila Ventura			28 November 1978 (aged 28)	Assistant coach(es)
	7	(Angola)	Ângela Cardoso			9 April 1979 (aged 28)
	8	(Angola)	Isabel Francisco			21 July 1980 (aged 27)
	9	(Angola)	Bárbara Guimarães			14 September 1980 (aged 27)
	10	(Angola)	Sónia Guadalupe			15 September 1985 (aged 22)
	11	(Cape Verde)	Crispina Correia			5 November 1975 (aged 31)
	12	(Angola)	Astrida Vicente			6 October 1978 (aged 29)
	13	(Angola)	Nacissela Maurício			2 June 1980 (aged 27)
	14	(Angola)	Ernestina Neto			6 November 1979 (aged 27)
	15	(Angola)	Jaquelina Francisco			16 March 1978 (aged 29)
