= 2007 FIBA Africa Women's Clubs Champions Cup =

2007 FIBA Africa Champions Cup for Women
13th FIBA Africa Champions Cup for Women

Tournament details
- Host country: Mozambique
- Dates: October 19 – 28, 2007
- Teams: 11 (from 53 federations)
- Venue: 1 (in 1 host city)

Final positions
- Champions: Mozambique (Desp de Maputo's 1st title; Mozambique's 3rd title)

Tournament statistics
- MVP: (Senegal) Salimata Diatta
- Top scorer: (Mozambique) Gimo 16.87
- Top rebounds: (Mali) Sininta 8.14
- Top assists: (Ivory Coast) Diomande 2.62
- PPG (Team): (Democratic Republic of the Congo) Arc-en-Ciel 70.7
- RPG (Team): (Mozambique) Desportivo 34.6
- APG (Team): (Mozambique) Desportivo 15.6

Official website
- 2007 FIBA Africa Women's Clubs Champions Cup

The 2007 FIBA Africa Women's Clubs Champions Cup (13th edition), was an international basketball tournament held in Maputo, Mozambique, from October 19 to 28, 2007. The tournament, organized by FIBA Africa and hosted by Clube Ferroviário de Maputo, was contested by 11 clubs split into 2 groups of 6, each group playing a round robin with the top four teams of each group qualifying for the knockout stages. This was Desp de Maputo's 1st title and Mozambique's 3rd.

The tournament was won by Desportivo de Maputo from Mozambique.

== Draw ==
| Group A | Group B |
|---|---|
| (Democratic Republic of the Congo) Arc-en-Ciel (Ivory Coast) Abidjan Basket Club (Nigeria) Dolphins (Mali) Djoliba (Mozambique) Desportivo de Maputo (Angola) Ferroviário de Maputo | (Nigeria) First Bank (Mozambique) ISPU; Kenya Ports Authority (Democratic Republic of the Congo) Lupopo (Angola) Primeiro de Agosto |

== Preliminary rounds ==
Times given below are in UTC+2.

=== Group A ===
| Qualified for the quarter-finals |

| | Group A | M | W | L | PF | PA | Diff | P |
|---|---|---|---|---|---|---|---|---|
| 1. | (Mozambique) Desportivo de Maputo | 5 | 5 | 0 | 288 | 246 | +42 | 10 |
| 2. | (Mozambique) Ferroviário de Maputo | 5 | 4 | 1 | 323 | 285 | +38 | 9 |
| 3. | (Mali) Djoliba | 5 | 3 | 2 | 236 | 224 | +12 | 8 |
| 4. | (Ivory Coast) Abidjan Basket Club | 5 | 2 | 3 | 255 | 279 | -24 | 7 |
| 5. | (Democratic Republic of the Congo) Arc-en-Ciel | 5 | 1 | 4 | 275 | 294 | −19 | 6 |
| 6. | (Nigeria) Dolphins | 5 | 0 | 5 | 259 | 308 | −49 | 5 |

19 October 2007
16:00

Boxscore

| Desp Maputo (Mozambique) | 68–55 | (Nigeria) Dolphins |
Scoring by quarter: 18-7, 15-13, 14-21, 21-14
| Pts: Dessai 15; Rebs: Anta Sy 11; Asts: A.Cossa 8 | | Pts: Sadiq, Aliyu 12; Rebs: Sadiq 11; Asts: Okworogun 3 |

Pavilhão do Desportivo de Maputo, Maputo

18:00

Boxscore

| Fer Maputo (Mozambique) | 67–46 | (Ivory Coast) Abidjan BC |
Scoring by quarter: 16-15, 20-10, 16-13, 15-8
| Pts: Gimo 18; Rebs: Nádia 7 Asts: Naltner, Zinóbia 2 | | Pts: Gbane 11; Rebs: Camara, Diomande 5 Asts: Camara 3 |

Pavilhão do Desportivo de Maputo, Maputo

October 22, 2007
11:00

Boxscore

| Arc-en-Ciel (Democratic Republic of the Congo) | 48–52 | (Mali) Djoliba |
Scoring by quarter: 12-13, 15-11, 8-14, 13-14
| Pts: Kalombo 17; Rebs: Tshitshi 6 Asts: Kalombo, Kamin 2 | | Pts: Sininta 17; Rebs: Keita 17; Asts: Adja Ba 3 |

Pavilhão do Desportivo de Maputo, Maputo

20 October 2007
16:00

Boxscore

| Abidjan BC (Ivory Coast) | 76–70 | (Nigeria) Dolphins |
Scoring by quarter: 18-20, 22-24, 11-10, 25-16
| Pts: Camara 15; Rebs: Abbady 4 Asts: Diomande 4 | | Pts: Iritei 22; Rebs: Arowosafe 7 Asts: Okworogun, Olaosebikan 2 |

Pavilhão do Desportivo de Maputo, Maputo

18:00

Boxscore

| Djoliba (Mali) | 65–73 | (Mozambique) Fer Maputo |
Scoring by quarter: 14-15, 16-22, 16-23, 19-13
| Pts: Sininta 23; Rebs: Sininta 8 Asts: Adja Ba 2 | | Pts: Gimo 20; Rebs: Gimo 8 Asts: Janet 4 |

Pavilhão do Desportivo de Maputo, Maputo

22 October 2007
18:00

[ Boxscore]

| Arc-en-Ciel (Democratic Republic of the Congo) | 56–59 | (Mozambique) Desp Maputo |
Scoring by quarter: 15-15, 15-18, 8-14, 18-12
| Pts: Kamin 22; Rebs: Kalombo 8 Asts: Ndandu 2 | | Pts: Diatta 23; Rebs: Anta Sy 6 Asts: Anta Sy 3 |

Pavilhão do Desportivo de Maputo, Maputo

21 October 2007
18:00

Boxscore

| Fer Maputo (Mozambique) | 69–67 | (Nigeria) Dolphins |
Scoring by quarter: 9-23, 15-9, 22-15, 23-20
| Pts: Janet 14; Rebs: Rute 11; Asts: Rute 5 | | Pts: Sadiq 20; Rebs: Chukwuma 11; Asts: three players 3 |

Pavilhão do Desportivo de Maputo, Maputo

20:00

Boxscore

| Djoliba (Mali) | 46–61 | (Mozambique) Desp Maputo |
Scoring by quarter: 13-16, 13-15, 2-18, 18-12
| Pts: Seremé 19; Rebs: Sininta 9 Asts: Sininta 2 | | Pts: A.Cossa 15; Rebs: Anta Sy 9 Asts: Valerdina 4 |

Pavilhão do Desportivo de Maputo, Maputo

14:00

Boxscore

| Abidjan BC (Ivory Coast) | 54–46 | (Democratic Republic of the Congo) Arc-en-Ciel |
Scoring by quarter: 17-13, 12-15, 6-8, 19-10
| Pts: Camara 19; Rebs: Benga 7 Asts: Diomande, Berte 2 | | Pts: Kamin 13; Rebs: Kalombo 9 Asts: Kalombo 3 |

Pavilhão do Desportivo de Maputo, Maputo

23 October 2007
16:00

Boxscore

| Djoliba (Mali) | 53–42 | (Ivory Coast) Abidjan BC |
Scoring by quarter: 7-10, 12-6, 22-10, 12-16
| Pts: Mbengue 12; Rebs: Keita 7 Asts: Sininta 6 | | Pts: Benga 16; Rebs: Benga 5 Asts: Drame 3 |

Pavilhão do Desportivo de Maputo, Maputo

18:00

Boxscore

| Fer Maputo (Mozambique) | 52–57 | (Mozambique) Desp Maputo |
Scoring by quarter: 7-14, 11-12, 13-15, 21-16
| Pts: Gimo 17; Rebs: Gimo 6 Asts: Rute 3 | | Pts: Anta Sy 17; Rebs: Anta Sy 16; Asts: Diatta 5 |

Pavilhão do Desportivo de Maputo, Maputo

20:00

Boxscore

| Dolphins (Nigeria) | 67–75 | (Democratic Republic of the Congo) Arc-en-Ciel |
Scoring by quarter: 14-19, 21-16, 14-25, 18-15
| Pts: Akashili 21; Rebs: Onyelugo, Arowosafe 6 Asts: four players 1 | | Pts: Kamin 22; Rebs: Kalombo 9 Asts: Kalombo, Tshitshi 3 |

Pavilhão do Desportivo de Maputo, Maputo

24 October 2007
14:00

Boxscore

| Desp Maputo (Mozambique) | 43–37 | (Ivory Coast) Abidjan BC |
Scoring by quarter: 13-13, 8-7, 8-4, 14-13
| Pts: three players 8 Rebs: Anta Sy 7 Asts: A.Cossa, Diatta 2 | | Pts: Camara 15; Rebs: Camara 11; Asts: Diomande, Benga 2 |

Pavilhão do Desportivo de Maputo, Maputo

16:00

| Dolphins (Nigeria) | 0–20 | (Mali) Djoliba |
Scoring by quarter: n/a, n/a
| Pts: n/a Rebs: n/a | | Pts: n/a Rebs: n/a |

Pavilhão do Desportivo de Maputo, Maputo

18:00

Boxscore

| Arc-en-Ciel (Democratic Republic of the Congo) | 50–62 | (Mozambique) Fer Maputo |
Scoring by quarter: 19-18, 12-9, 8-13, 11-22
| Pts: Kamin 16; Rebs: Nyama 9 Asts: Kamin, Kalombo 4 | | Pts: Gimo 20; Rebs: Gimo 14; Asts: Zinóbia 7 |

Pavilhão do Desportivo de Maputo, Maputo

=== Group B ===
| Qualified for the quarter-finals |

| | Group B | M | W | L | PF | PA | Diff | P |
|---|---|---|---|---|---|---|---|---|
| 1. | (Angola) Primeiro de Agosto | 4 | 4 | 0 | 266 | 177 | +89 | 8 |
| 2. | (Mozambique) ISPU | 4 | 3 | 1 | 236 | 194 | +42 | 7 |
| 3. | (Nigeria) First Bank | 4 | 2 | 2 | 232 | 220 | +12 | 6 |
| 4. | Kenya Ports Authority | 1 | 1 | 3 | 162 | 208 | -46 | 5 |
| 5. | (Democratic Republic of the Congo) Lupopo | 4 | 0 | 4 | 172 | 269 | -97 | 4 |

19 October 2007
14:00

Boxscore

| KPA (Kenya) | 38–56 | (Angola) 1º de Agosto |
Scoring by quarter: 7-10, 8-20, 12-9, 11-17
| Pts: Anyango 13; Rebs: Anyango 6 Asts: Anyango, Okech 2 | | Pts: Nacissela, Crispina 10; Rebs: Nacissela 8 Asts: Nacissela 3 |

Pavilhão do Desportivo de Maputo, Maputo

20:00

Boxscore

| First Bank (Nigeria) | 58–67 | (Mozambique) ISPU |
Scoring by quarter: 19-21, 9-17, 14-15, 16-14
| Pts: Udeaja 14; Rebs: Udeaja 12; Asts: Whyte 3 | | Pts: Azinheira 24; Rebs: Chongo 8 Asts: Amélia 3 |

Pavilhão do Desportivo de Maputo, Maputo

20 October 2007
20:00

Boxscore

| 1º de Agosto (Angola) | 65–49 | (Mozambique) ISPU |
Scoring by quarter: 18-7, 23-9, 10-15, 14-18
| Pts: Nacissela, Manú 13; Rebs: Manú 8 Asts: Astrida, I.Francisco 3 | | Pts: Amélia 14; Rebs: Iracema 7 Asts: Amélia 4 |

Pavilhão do Desportivo de Maputo, Maputo

22 October 2007
16:00

Boxscore

| First Bank (Nigeria) | 71–58 | (Democratic Republic of the Congo) Lupopo |
Scoring by quarter: 14-5, 18-16, 23-18, 16-19
| Pts: Ojelabi 16; Rebs: Udeaja, James 6 Asts: Adibeli 3 | | Pts: Baketukila 12; Rebs: Kazadi 4 Asts: three players 2 |

Pavilhão do Desportivo de Maputo, Maputo

21 October 2007
14:00

Boxscore

| KPA (Kenya) | 37–53 | (Nigeria) First Bank |
Scoring by quarter: n/a, n/a
| Pts: n/a Rebs: n/a | | Pts: n/a Rebs: n/a |

Pavilhão do Desportivo de Maputo, Maputo

16:00

Boxscore

| ISPU (Mozambique) | 58–37 | (Democratic Republic of the Congo) Lupopo |
Scoring by quarter: 24-16, 6-10, 14-3, 14-8
| Pts: Azinheira 16; Rebs: Azinheira 8 Asts: Amélia 6 | | Pts: Kanku 9 Rebs: Kazadi 6 Asts: Odimba, Ndangi 1 |

Pavilhão do Desportivo de Maputo, Maputo

23 October 2007
12:00

Boxscore

| ISPU (Mozambique) | 62–34 | (Kenya) KPA |
Scoring by quarter: 18-10, 9-6, 21-12, 14-6
| Pts: Dulce 14; Rebs: Azinheira, Amélia 4 Asts: Tânia, Branquinho 4 | | Pts: Obwong 10; Rebs: Aratoh 4 Asts: five players 1 |

Pavilhão do Desportivo de Maputo, Maputo

14:00

Boxscore

| Lupopo (Democratic Republic of the Congo) | 40–87 | (Angola) 1º de Agosto |
Scoring by quarter: 5-22, 9-28, 17-23, 9-14
| Pts: Odimba 9 Rebs: Odimba, Kazadi 3 Asts: three players 1 | | Pts: Nacissela 13; Rebs: Jaquelina 6 Asts: Domitila, I.Francisco 2 |

Pavilhão do Desportivo de Maputo, Maputo

24 October 2007
18:00

Boxscore

| Lupopo (Democratic Republic of the Congo) | 37–53 | (Kenya) KPA |
Scoring by quarter: 12-16, 13-10, 3-19, 9-8
| Pts: Kanku 9 Rebs: Kalanga 5 Asts: five players 1 | | Pts: Anyango 13; Rebs: Anyango 8 Asts: Obwong 7 |

Pavilhão do Desportivo de Maputo, Maputo

20:00

Boxscore

| 1º de Agosto (Angola) | 58–50 | (Nigeria) First Bank |
Scoring by quarter: 13-17, 15-14, 16-8, 14-11
| Pts: Nacissela 18; Rebs: Nacissela 11; Asts: Nacissela 3 | | Pts: Bhadmus, James 12; Rebs: Oha 9 Asts: Bhadmus 2 |

Pavilhão do Desportivo de Maputo, Maputo

== Knockout stage ==
9th-11th Place
October 26 - 12:00
(Nigeria) Dolphins | 63
(Democratic Republic of the Congo) Lupopo | 46

9th place
October 28 - 12:00
(Democratic Republic of the Congo) Arc-en-Ciel | 93
(Nigeria) Dolphins | 88
11th place

Quarter-finals
October 26 - 14:00
(Kenya) KPA | 45
(Mozambique) Desp Maputo | 54
October 26 - 20:00
(Mali) Djoliba | 51
(Mozambique) ISPU | 65
October 26 - 18:00
(Nigeria) First Bank | 66
(Mozambique) Fer Maputo | 71
October 26 - 16:00
(Ivory Coast) Abidjan BC | 60
(Angola) 1º de Agosto | 68

5th-8th Place
October 27 - 14:00
(Kenya) KPA | 34
(Mali) Djoliba | 46
October 27 - 16:00
(Ivory Coast) Abidjan BC | 54
(Nigeria) First Bank | 41

5th place
October 28
(Mali) Djoliba | 48
(Ivory Coast) Abidjan BC | 59
7th place
October 28
(Kenya) KPA | 41
(Rwanda) First Bank | 53

Quarter-finals
October 26 - 14:00
(Kenya) KPA | 45
(Mozambique) Desp Maputo | 54
October 26 - 20:00
(Mali) Djoliba | 51
(Mozambique) ISPU | 65
October 26 - 16:00
(Ivory Coast) Abidjan BC | 60
(Angola) 1º de Agosto | 68
October 26 - 18:00
(Nigeria) First Bank | 66
(Mozambique) Fer Maputo | 71

Semi-finals
October 27 - 20:00
(Mozambique) Desp Maputo | 55
(Mozambique) ISPU | 49
October 27 - 18:00
(Angola) 1º de Agosto | 50
(Mozambique) Fer Maputo | 43

Final
October 28 - 19:00
(Mozambique) Desp Maputo | 64
(Angola) 1º de Agosto | 47
Third place
October 28 - 17:00
(Mozambique) ISPU | 56
(Mozambique) Fer Maputo | 63

=== 9–11th place ===
26 October 2007
12:00

Boxscore

| Dolphins (Nigeria) | 63–46 | (Democratic Republic of the Congo) Lupopo |
Scoring by quarter: 13-17, 12-8, 6-11, 32-10
| Pts: Akashili 12; Rebs: Igben 9 Asts: Iritei, Okworogun 3 | | Pts: Kazadi 17; Rebs: Kazadi 10; Asts: Muleka, Loota 2 |

Pavilhão do Desportivo de Maputo, Maputo

=== Quarter finals ===
26 October 2007
14:00

Boxscore

| KPA (Kenya) | 45–54 | (Mozambique) Desp Maputo |
Scoring by quarter: 10-12, 14-7, 12-17, 9-18
| Pts: Makau 8 Rebs: A.Anyango 9 Asts: D.Anyango 3 | | Pts: Diatta 23; Rebs: Diatta 9 Asts: Dessai, Nádia 4 |

Pavilhão do Desportivo de Maputo, Maputo

16:00

Boxscore

| Abidjan BC (Ivory Coast) | 60–68 | (Angola) 1º de Agosto |
Scoring by quarter: 17-21, 13-19, 14-6, 16-22
| Pts: Camara 22; Rebs: Benga 8 Asts: Diomande 5 | | Pts: Nacissela 19; Rebs: Nacissela 13; Asts: Domitila 3 |

Pavilhão do Desportivo de Maputo, Maputo

18:00

Boxscore

| First Bank (Nigeria) | 66–71 | (Mozambique) Fer Maputo |
Scoring by quarter: 24-28, 12-19, 12-13, 18-11
| Pts: Udeaja 28; Rebs: Oha 15; Asts: Bhadmus, Whyte 4 | | Pts: C.Silva 21; Rebs: Rute 9 Asts: three players 4 |

Pavilhão do Desportivo de Maputo, Maputo

20:00

Boxscore

| Djoliba (Mali) | 51–65 | (Mozambique) ISPU |
Scoring by quarter: 11-21, 16-13, 13-20, 11-11
| Pts: Sininta 12; Rebs: Sininta 12; Asts: Sininta 4 | | Pts: Tânia, Amélia 12; Rebs: Azinheira, Aleia 8 Asts: three players 2 |

Pavilhão do Desportivo de Maputo, Maputo

=== 9th place ===
27 October 2007
12:00

Boxscore

| Arc-en-Ciel (Democratic Republic of the Congo) | 93–88 (OT) | (Nigeria) Dolphins |
Scoring by quarter: 28-22, 5-21, 20-17, 26-19, Overtime: 14-9
| Pts: Kalombo 23; Rebs: Kalombo 10; Asts: Kamin 6 | | Pts: Sadiq 24; Rebs: Sadiq 14; Asts: Olaosebikan 5 |

Pavilhão do Maxaquene, Maputo

=== 5–8th place ===
27 October 2007
14:00

Boxscore

| KPA (Kenya) | 34–46 | (Mali) Djoliba |
Scoring by quarter: 8-10, 9-14, 5-15, 12-7
| Pts: Obwong 17; Rebs: Obwong 6 Asts: five players 1 | | Pts: Seremé 15; Rebs: Sininta, M.Traore 8 Asts: N.Traore 3 |

Pavilhão do Maxaquene, Maputo

16:00

Boxscore

| Abidjan BC (Ivory Coast) | 54–41 | (Nigeria) First Bank |
Scoring by quarter: 12-8, 10-9, 12-14, 20-10
| Pts: Drame 15; Rebs: Abbady 8 Asts: Diomande 3 | | Pts: Udeaja 11; Rebs: Oha 11; Asts: Whyte 2 |

Pavilhão do Maxaquene, Maputo

=== Semifinals ===
27 October 2007
18:00

Boxscore

| 1º de Agosto (Angola) | 50–43 | (Mozambique) Fer Maputo |
Scoring by quarter: 9-11, 19-10, 8-13, 14-9
| Pts: Crispina 15; Rebs: Nacissela 13; Asts: I.Francisco 5 | | Pts: Gimo 17; Rebs: Rute 9 Asts: Rute 2 |

Pavilhão do Maxaquene, Maputo

27 October 2007
20:00

Boxscore

| Desp Maputo (Mozambique) | 55–49 | (Mozambique) ISPU |
Scoring by quarter: 12-9, 14-12, 15-8, 14-20
| Pts: Dessai 25; Rebs: Anta Sy 11; Asts: Diatta, Nádia 3 | | Pts: Iracema, Branquinho 10; Rebs: Iracema 7 Asts: six players 1 |

Pavilhão do Maxaquene, Maputo

=== 7th place ===
28 October 2007
08:00

Boxscore

| KPA (Kenya) | 41–53 | (Nigeria) First Bank |
Scoring by quarter: 8-16, 8-13, 13-7, 12-17
| Pts: Olang 9 Rebs: Mureji 6 Asts: three players 2 | | Pts: Udeaja 12; Rebs: Oha 17; Asts: Ojelabi 4 |

Pavilhão do Desportivo de Maputo, Maputo

=== 5th place ===
28 October 2007
15:00

Boxscore

| Djoliba (Mali) | 48–59 | (Ivory Coast) Abidjan BC |
Scoring by quarter: 15-9, 14-13, 8-20, 11-17
| Pts: Sininta 11; Rebs: Sininta 10; Asts: N.Traore 2 | | Pts: Diomande 15; Rebs: Diomande 7 Asts: Diomande 3 |

Pavilhão do Desportivo de Maputo, Maputo

=== Bronze medal game ===
28 October 2007
17:00

[ Boxscore]

| ISPU (Mozambique) | 56–63 | (Mozambique) Fer Maputo |
Scoring by quarter: 9-13, 15-11, 16-16, 16-23
| Pts: Amélia, Azinheira 14; Rebs: Amélia 4 Asts: Amélia 3 | | Pts: Gimo 15; Rebs: Zinóbia 6 Asts: five players 2 |

Pavilhão do Desportivo de Maputo, Maputo

=== Gold medal game ===
28 October 2007
19:00

Boxscore

| Desp Maputo (Mozambique) | 64–47 | (Angola) 1º de Agosto |
Scoring by quarter: 22-16, 15-9, 11-7, 16-15
| Pts: Diatta, Dessai 15; Rebs: Anta Sy 8 Asts: Anta Sy 6 | | Pts: Domitila 17; Rebs: Crispina, Astrida 7 Asts: Domitila 4 |

Pavilhão do Maxaquene, Maputo

== Final standings ==
| Rank | Team | Record |
|---|---|---|
| Gold medal | (Mozambique) Desportivo de Maputo | 8–0 |
| Silver medal | (Angola) Primeiro de Agosto | 6–1 |
| Bronze medal | (Mozambique) Ferroviário de Maputo | 6–2 |
| 4 | (Mozambique) ISPU | 4–3 |
| 5 | (Ivory Coast) Abidjan Basket Club | 4–4 |
| 6 | (Mali) Djoliba AC | 4–4 |
| 7 | (Nigeria) First Bank | 3–4 |
| 8 | Kenya Ports Authority | 1–6 |
| 9 | (Democratic Republic of the Congo) Arc-en-Ciel | 2–4 |
| 10 | (Nigeria) Dolphins | 1–6 |
| 11 | (Democratic Republic of the Congo) Lupopo | 0–5 |

Desportivo de Maputo roster
Anabela Cossa, Anta Sy, Cátia Halar, Crichúlia Monjane, Diara Dessai, Josefina Jafar, Luísa Nhate, Nádia Rodrigues, Odélia Mafanela, Salimata Diatta, Sílvia Neves, Valerdina Manhonga, Coach: Nazir Salé

== All Tournament Team ==
| G | (Senegal) Salimata Diatta |
| F | (Senegal) Anta Sy |
| F | (Angola) Nacissela Maurício |
| C | (Ivory Coast) Fatoumata Camara |
| C | (Mozambique) Deolinda Gimo |

2007 FIBA Africa Women's Clubs Champions Cup

Grupo Desportivo de Maputo
1st Title

Most Valuable Player
(Senegal) Salimata Diatta

== See also ==
- 2007 FIBA Africa Championship for Women
