= Diomande =

Diomande or Diomandé is a surname. Notable people with the surname include:

- Adama Diomande (born 1990), Norwegian footballer
- Aïchata Diomande (born 1984), Ivorian women's basketball player
- Ismaël Diomandé (born 1992), Ivorian footballer
- Ismaël Diomandé (born 2003), Ivorian footballer
- Lassina Diomandé (born 1979), Ivorian footballer
- Mé Aboubacar Diomandé (born 1988), Ivorian footballer
- Mohamed Diomande (born 2001), Ivorian footballer
- Olivier Diomandé (born 1974), French-born Ivorian rugby union player
- Ousmane Diomande (born 2003), Ivorian footballer
- Souleymane Diomandé (born 1992), Ivorian footballer
- Vamouti Diomande (born 1991), Ivorian footballer
- Yan Diomande (born 2006), Ivorian footballer
