= Lassina =

Lassina is a West African given name. It can be found in Côte d'Ivoire, Burkina Faso, and Mali. Notable people with the name include:

- Lassina Dao (born 1971), Ivorian footballer
- Lassina Dao (footballer, born 1996), Ivorian footballer
- Lassina Diabaté (born 1974), Ivorian footballer
- Lassina Diaby, Ivorian footballer
- Lassina Diarra, Malian footballer
- Lassina Diomandé (born 1979), Ivorian footballer
- Lassina Touré (born 1994), Burkinabé footballer
- Lassina Traoré (born 2001), Burkinabé footballer
- Lassina Zerbo (born 1963), Burkinabé politician
