= Charity Mucucuti =

Zimbabwean basketball and rugby union player

Charity Mucucuti (born 9 November 1983) is a Zimbabwean women's basketball and rugby union player from Goromonzi, Zimbabwe. She has played for both the Zimbabwe women's national basketball team and the Zimbabwe women's national rugby union team.

== Basketball ==
Mucucuti started playing basketball for the Cameo basketball team, which won forty regional and national championships. She made her international debut for Zimbabwe in the qualifying round of the 2007 FIBA Africa Championship for Women. She also participated in the Basketball at the 2007 All-Africa Games – Women's tournament. She continued to represent Zimbabwe internationally until 2015 where she started playing rugby union. In 2017, she returned to basketball to play for Zimbabwe in the AfroBasket Women 2017 qualification tournament.

== Rugby union ==
After moving on from basketball, Mucucuti started to play rugby union. She eventually became captain of the Zimbabwe women's national rugby sevens team. She started playing as a winger but later moved to prop due to losing pace.
