= Stade Maniang Soumaré =

- Location of the stadium
- Location: Thiès, Senegal
- Coordinates: 14.78867°N 16.93169°W
- Capacity: 8,000
- Surface: Artificial turf

Tenant
- US Rail

Stade Maniang Soumaré is a multi-use stadium in Thiès, Senegal. It is currently used mostly for football matches and serves as a home ground of US Rail. The stadium holds 8,000 people.

Around 2021 an artificial turf was installed in the stadium, replacing clay/gravel surface. Also, a new larger stand was built on the Eastern part of the stadium.
