= Diéné Diawara =

Malian basketball player (born 1988)

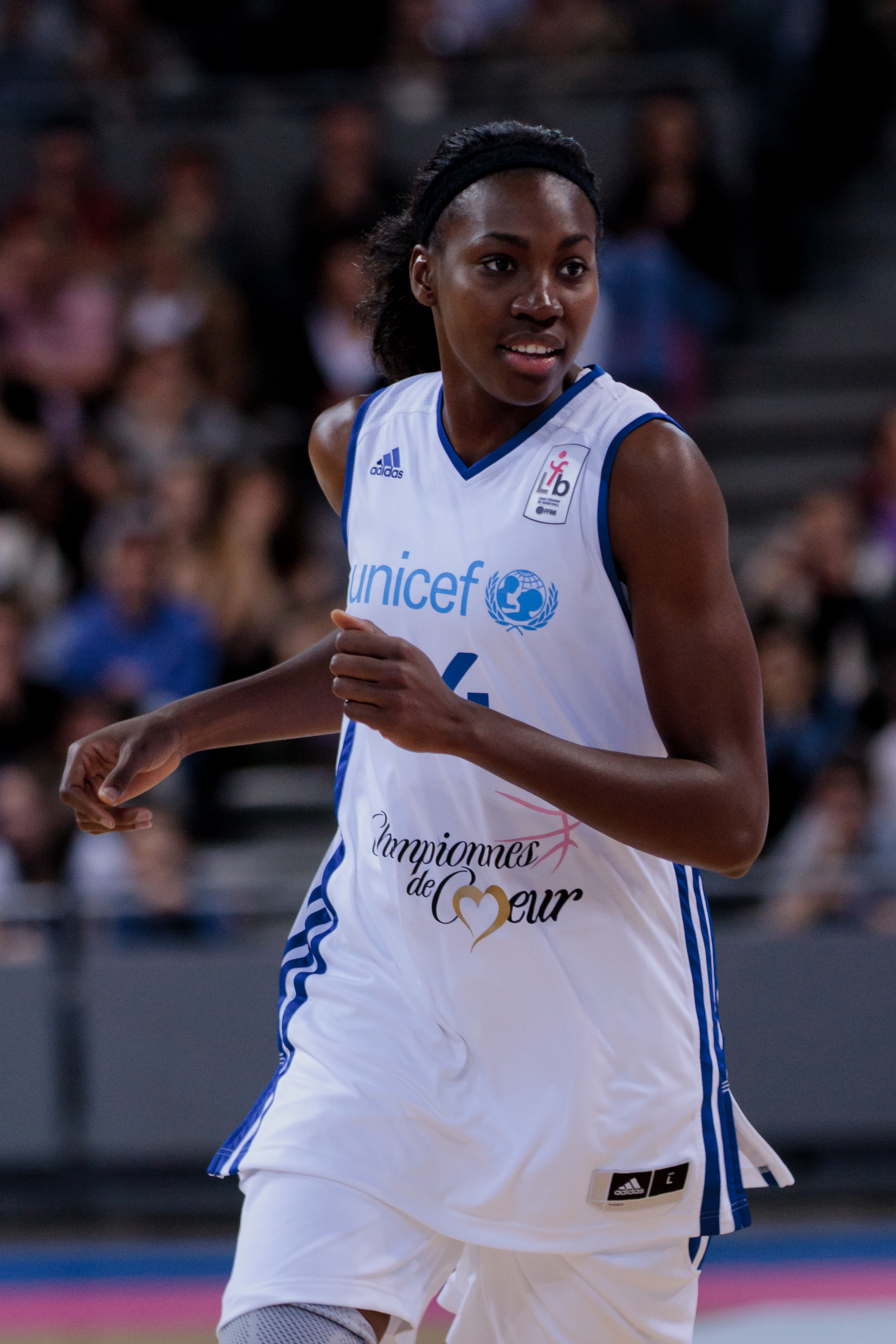

Diéné Diawara (born 1988), is a Malian women's basketball player with Limoges ABC of the French Ligue Féminine de Basketball. She also competes for the Mali women's national basketball team. At the FIBA Africa Championship for Women 2007 in Senegal, she helped her squad win the tournament, qualifying it for Basketball at the 2008 Summer Olympics. Diawara was also the top rebounder of the tournament. She is the sister of Lamine Diawara and Nare Diawara.
