= Fatoumata Koné =

Ivorian basketball player

Personal information
- Born: September 7, 1988 (age 38) Koumassi, Ivory Coast
- Position: Point guard / shooting guard

Career history
- 20??-2009: Olympique Basket Club
- 2009-2013: Abidjan Basket Club

Fatoumata Koné (born September 7, 1988) is an Ivorian female professional basketball player. She played on the 2013 Ivory Coast women's national basketball team.
