= Olivier Diomandé =

- Born: April 26, 1974 (age 52) Lyon, France
- Height: 1.8 m (5 ft 11 in)
- Weight: 110 kg (240 lb; 17 st)

Rugby union career
- Position: Hooker
Senior career
| Years | Team | Apps | (Points) |
| 1997-98 | Stade Français | | |
| 1998-2000 | RC Nîmes | | |
| 2000-2002 | Bègles-Bordeaux | 7 | (0) |
| 2002-2008 | Montpellier Hérault | 118 | (75) |
| 2008-2010 | Racing Métro 92 | 41 | (5) |
| 2010-2011 | RC Nîmes | 0 | (0) |
International career
| Years | Team | Apps | (Points) |
- Ivory Coast

Olivier Diomandé (born April 26, 1974 in Lyon, France) is a French-born Ivorian rugby union player. He plays as a hooker.

Diomandé played for Club Sportif Annonay (1992/93-1993/94), US Romans (1994/95-1996/97), Stade Français (1997/98), RC Nîmes (1998/99-1999/2000), Bègles-Bordeaux (2000/01-2001/02), Montpellier Hérault (2002/03-2007/08), Racing Métro 92 (2007/08-2009/10) and RC Nîmes, since 2010/11, at the Fédérale 2. He won the Pro D2 with Montpellier Hérault, in 2002/03, and the European Challenge Cup, in 2004. He won again the Pro D2 for Racing Métro 92, in 2008/09.

He plays for Côte d'Ivoire at international level.
