= Lassina Touré =

Burkinabé footballer (born 1994)

Personal information
- Full name: Lassina Touré
- Date of birth: 18 February 1992 (age 34)
- Place of birth: Burkina Faso
- Height: 1.84 m (6 ft 0 in)
- Position: Defender

Team information
- Current team: Vitória de Guimarães B

Senior career*
Years	Team	Apps	(Gls)
2011–2013	G.D. Tourizense	43	(3)
2013–	Vitória de Guimarães B	30	(1)
- * Club domestic league appearances and goals as of 2 May 2014, 22:33 UTC

Lassina Touré (born 18 February 1994) is a Burkinabé footballer who plays for Vitória de Guimarães B.
