= Lassina Diomandé =

Ivorian footballer

Personal information
- Date of birth: 24 June 1979 (age 47)
- Place of birth: Abidjan, Ivory Coast
- Height: 1.86 m (6 ft 1 in)
- Position: Defender

Team information
- Current team: Lokomotiv Mezdra
- Number: 30

Senior career*
Years	Team	Apps	(Gls)
1998–1999	Man FC	?	(?)
2000–2003	Africa Sports	?	(?)
2003–2008	Jeunesse Club	?	(?)
2009–	Loko Mezdra		

International career
2001	Ivory Coast	1	(0)
- * Club domestic league appearances and goals as of 15:18, 2 March 2009 (UTC)

Lassina Diomandé (born 24 June 1979 in Abidjan, Ivory Coast) is an Ivorian footballer who plays in the defender position. He currently plays for Lokomotiv Mezdra in the Bulgarian top division.

== Career ==
After spending the first ten years of his career in his home country with Man Fc, Africa Sports National and Jeunesse Club d'Abidjan, Diomandé relocated to Bulgaria in February 2009, signing a contract with Lokomotiv Mezdra.

== International career ==
He played for Ivory Coast national football team and was capped one time in 2001.
