= Louisa da Conceição =

Cape Verdean basketball player (born 1974)

Personal information
- Born: 7 December 1974 (age 51) Praia, Cape Verde
- Position: Forward

Louisa da Conceição is a former Cape Verdean basketball player who represented the Cape Verde women's national basketball team in international competitions.

== Professional career ==
Louisa Sança Silva Illaria da Conceição was born in Praia, Cape Verde, on December 7, 1974. She played as a forward and was a key figure in Cape Verdean women's basketball during the early 2000s.

She participated in the FIBA Africa Championship for Women, where she competed against top national teams across the continent. Her performance included contributions in scoring, rebounding, and leadership on the court.

== Cape Verde national team ==
Da Conceição was a member of the Cape Verde women's national basketball team, representing her country in multiple editions of the FIBA Women's AfroBasket tournament.
