= Nare Diawara =

Malian basketball player (born 1983)

Nare Diawara (born 22 January 1983, in Bamako) is a Malian professional women's basketball center, formerly with the WNBA's San Antonio Stars. Diawara was drafted in the third round (30th overall) of the 2007 WNBA draft. She played collegiately at Virginia Tech, US. She is the sister of Diéné Diawara and Lamine Diawara.

== Virginia Tech statistics ==
Ratios
Year	Team	GP	FG%	3P%	FT%	RBG	APG	BPG	SPG	PPG
2003-04	Virginia Tech	8	22.2%	-	50.0%	1.63	0.13	0.38	-	1.00
2004-05	Virginia Tech	19	32.6%	-	54.3%	2.90	0.32	0.37	0.53	2.58
2005-06	Virginia Tech	30	42.1%	-	67.3%	4.33	0.53	0.83	0.47	4.57
2006-07	Virginia Tech	34	49.5%	-	72.3%	8.06	1.24	1.56	0.68	12.32
Career		91	45.5%	0.0%	68.1%	5.19	0.71	0.97	0.52	6.74

Totals
Year	Team	GP	FG	FGA	3P	3PA	FT	FTA	REB	A	BK	ST	PTS
2003-04	Virginia Tech	8	2	9	0	0	4	8	13	1	3	0	8
2004-05	Virginia Tech	19	15	46	0	0	19	35	55	6	7	10	49
2005-06	Virginia Tech	30	51	121	0	0	35	52	130	16	25	14	137
2006-07	Virginia Tech	34	152	307	0	2	115	159	274	42	53	23	419
Career		91	220	483	0	2	173	254	472	65	88	47	613
