= Jade Leitão =

Cape Verdean basketball player

Personal information
- Born: July 13, 1983 (age 43) Inglewood, United States
- Listed height: 1.80 m (5 ft 11 in)

Jade Kathleen Leitao (born July 13, 1983) is a Cape Verdean female basketball player. She participated with the Cape Verde team in the 2005, 2007, 2013, 2019 and 2021 African Championships.
