= Amel Bouderra =

French basketball player

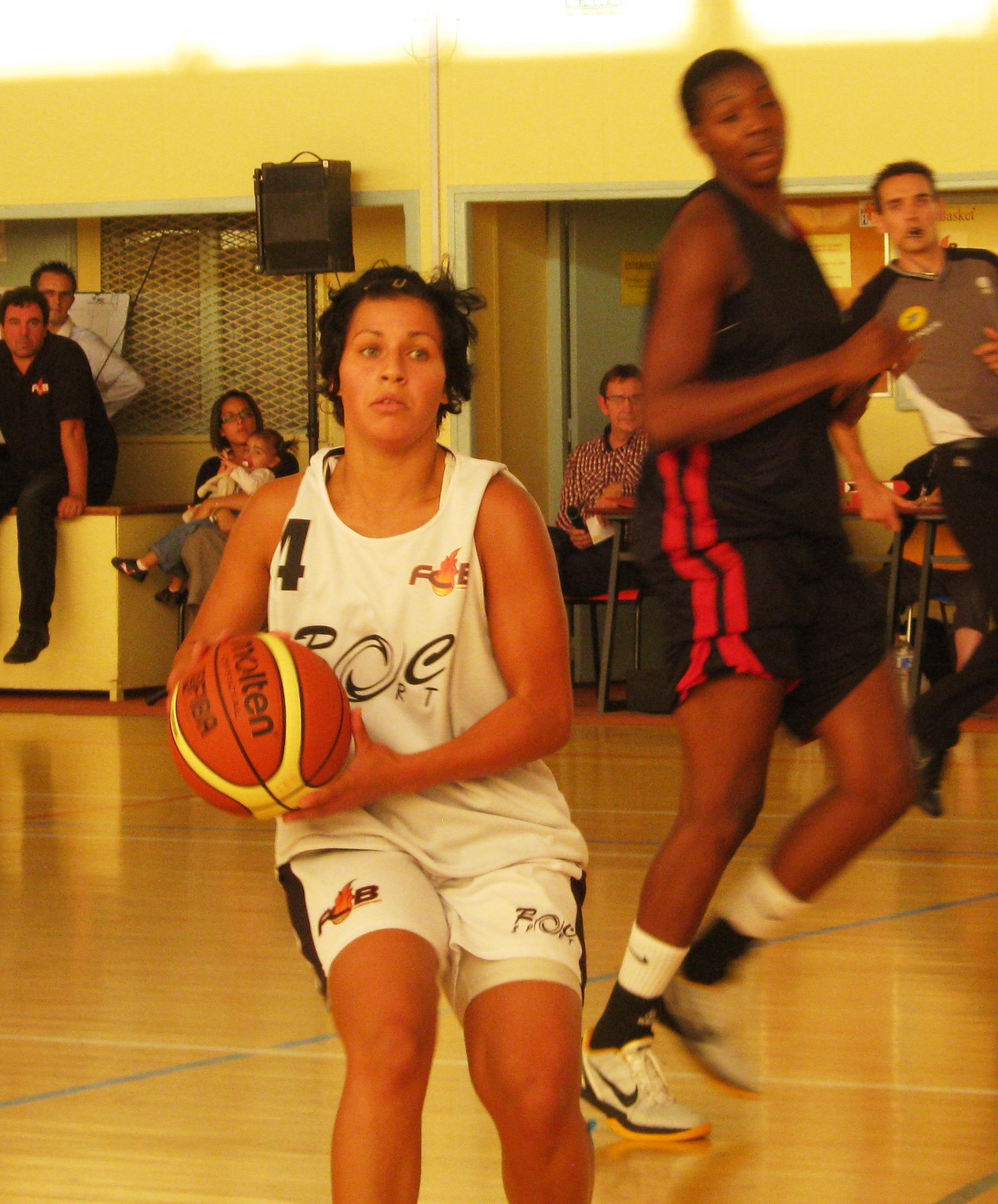
- French basketball player

Flammes Carolo Basket
- Position: Guard
- League: Ligue Féminine de Basketball

Personal information
- Born: 26 March 1989 (age 37) Mulhouse, France
- Listed height: 5 ft 4 in (1.63 m)

Amel Bouderra (born 26 March 1989) is a French basketball player for Flammes Carolo Basket and the French national team, where she participated at the 2016 Summer Olympics.
