= Nasir Salé =

Mozambican basketball coach

Nasir Salé (born 17 August 1966) is a Mozambican basketball coach. He is the current head of the Mozambique women's national basketball team, having been the head coach since the 2007 FIBA Africa Championship for Women. He was the coach of the team when they had their first ever qualification to the FIBA Women's Basketball World Cup in 2014. He also organized basketball training camps in Ivory Coast with the Ivory Coast men's national basketball team. In 2020, he became head coach of Clube Ferroviário de Maputo's women's basketball team.
