= Adama Diakhaté =

Senegalese basketball player

Personal information
- Born: 3 February 1970 (age 56) Dakar, Senegal
- Listed height: 5 ft 10 in (1.78 m)

Adama Diakhaté (born 3 February 1970) is a Senegalese former basketball player who competed in the 2000 Summer Olympics. She was born in Dakar.
