= Oluchi Okorie =

Nigerian basketball player

Personal information
- Born: 28 August 1981 (age 45) Lagos, Nigeria
- Listed height: 188 cm (6 ft 2 in)

Career information
- College: Texas State Bobcats
- Position: Forward, center
- Number: 7

Oluchi Mercy Okorie (born 28 August 1981 in Lagos) is a former Nigerian basketball player who played for First Bank B.C and the Nigerian national team. She represented Nigeria at the 2005, 2006 and 2007 FIBA Africa Championship.

== Sports career ==
From 20 December to 28 December, at the Indoor Sports Hall in Abuja, Nigeria hosted the FIBA Africa Championship for Women in 2005. At the event, Oluchi represented Nigeria and won a gold medal.

At the 2006 FIBA Africa Women's Clubs Champions Cup in which she participated, Oluchi won a bronze medal.
