= Bineta Diouf =

Senegalese basketball player (born 1978)

Personal information
- Born: 13 November 1978 (age 48) Rufisque, Dakar, Senegal
- Listed height: 6 ft 1 in (1.85 m)

Bineta Diouf (born 13 November 1978 in Rufisque, Dakar) is a Senegalese women's basketball player. She is a member of the Senegal women's national basketball team and has competed with the squad at the 2000 Summer Olympics and later tournaments, including the 2008 FIBA World Olympic Qualifying Tournament.
