= Crispina Correia =

Cape Verdean basketball player

Personal information
- Born: November 5, 1975 (age 51) Praia, Cape Verde
- Listed height: 1.91 m (6 ft 3 in)
- Position: Center
Medals
Women's basketball
Representing Angola
FIBA Africa Clubs Champions Cup
Silver medal – second place	Maputo 2007	1º de Agosto
Silver medal – second place	Nairobi 2008	1º de Agosto

Crispina Inès Andrade Correia (born November 5, 1975) is a former Cape Verdean female basketball player.
