= Mame Diodio Diouf =

Senegalese basketball player (born 1984)

No. 8 – CB Islas Canarias
- Position: Point guard
- League: LFB

Personal information
- Born: 15 December 1984 (age 41) Dakar, Senegal
- Listed height: 1.75 m (5 ft 9 in)
- Listed weight: 70 kg (154 lb)

Career information
- WNBA draft: 2006: undrafted
Medals
Women's basketball
Representing Senegal
AfroBasket
Silver medal – second place	2017 Mali	Team
Silver medal – second place	2019 Senegal	Team
African Games (All-Africa Games)
Gold medal – first place	2007 Algiers	Team
Gold medal – first place	2011 Maputo	Team

Mame Diodio Diouf (born 15 December 1984), also known as Diodio Diouf, is a Senegalese women's basketball player.

== Career ==
She began her career in DUC, the university club of Dakar. She was voted Queen of the Season 2005–2006 for her play with the club of DUC.

She played professionally in Switzerland. There, she started with the Esperance club with which she won the Cup of the League. She later joined Arnold-Reymond.

Diouf competed for Senegal at the 2016 Summer Olympics.
