= Ângela Cardoso =

Angolan basketball player (born 1979)

Personal information
- Born: 9 April 1979 (age 47) Luanda, Angola
- Listed height: 180 cm (5 ft 11 in)
- Position: Power forward

Ângela Sónia Monteiro Cardoso (born 9 April 1979) is a former Angolan basketball player. At the 2012 Summer Olympics, she competed for the Angola women's national basketball team in the women's event. She is 5 ft 11 inches tall.
