= Kadiatou Kanouté =

Malian basketball player (born 1978)

Kadidiatou Kanouté Tounkara OLY (born 11 June 1978) is a Malian women's basketball player. A member of the Mali women's national basketball team, Kanouté competed for Mali at the 2008 Summer Olympics.
