= Nacissela Maurício =

Angolan basketball player

Personal information
- Born: 2 June 1980 (age 46) Luanda, Angola
- Listed height: 186 cm (6 ft 1 in)
- Listed weight: 80 kg (176 lb)

Career information
- Playing career: 1997–present
- Position: Power forward

Career history
- 1997–1998: Petro Atlético
- 1998–1999: 1º de Agosto
- 1999–2000: Esgueira
- 2000–2001: Basket CBV
- 2001–2002: Cinturon Verde Vetusta
- 2002: CAB Madeira
- 2002–2004: La Cistérniga
- 2005–2006: Armijo Badajoz
- 2006–2007: Serrano Badajoz
- 2007–2016: 1º de Agosto

Career highlights
- 2008 Angolan Basketball League MVP; 2011 FIBA Africa Championship MVP; 2013 FIBA Africa Championship MVP

Nacissela Cristina de Oliveira Maurício (born 2 June 1980) is a former Angolan professional basketball player. Maurício plays as power forward at club level for Angolan side Primeiro de Agosto. Mauricio was also a member of the Angola women's national basketball team at the FIBA Africa Championship for Women 2007 and FIBA World Olympic Qualifying Tournament for Women 2008. She was part of the Angolan team that participated in the 2012 Summer Olympics. Mauricio has played professionally in Spain and Portugal.

== Achievements ==
Titles won	MVP Awards
2015 FIBA Africa Champions Cup; 2013 FIBA Africa Championship; 2013 Angolan Basketball League; 2011 FIBA Africa Championship	2013 FIBA Africa Championship; 2011 FIBA Africa Championship; 2008 Angolan Basketball League
