= Anabela Cossa =

Mozambican basketball player

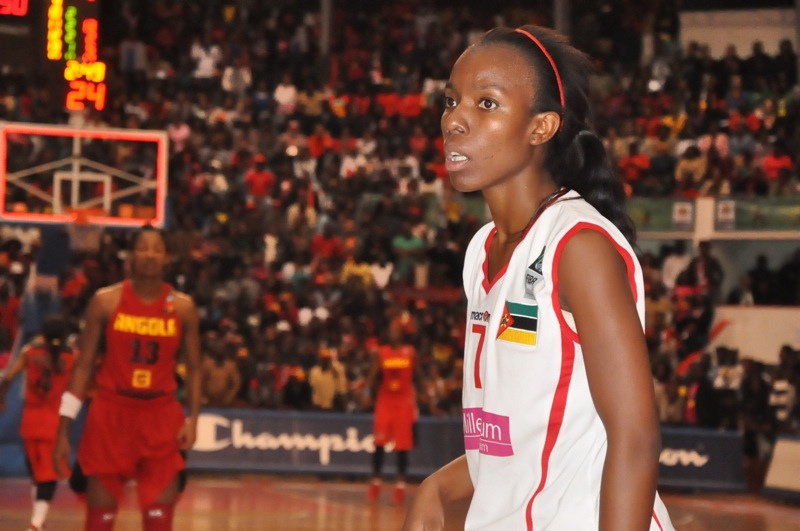

No. 10 – Ferroviário de Maputo
- Position: Shooting guard

Personal information
- Born: 7 April 1986 (age 40) Maputo, Mozambique
- Listed height: 1.72 m (5 ft 8 in)

Career history
- 2008–2014: Desportivo de Maputo

Anabela Cossa (born 7 April 1986) is a Mozambican female professional basketball player.
