= Aminata Sininta =

Malian basketball player (born 1985)

Aminata Sininta (born December 23, 1985, in Bamako) is a Malian women's basketball player. Sininta represented Mali, and competed as part of the women's national basketball team at the 2008 Summer Olympics in Beijing. During the tournament, she scored a total of twenty-four points in five group play games, including thirteen against the United States in the third match.

Sininta is also a member of Djoliba AC women's basketball team in Bamako.
