= Deolinda Gimo =

Mozambican basketball player

Ferroviário de Maputo
- Position: Center
- League: Mozambique Basketball League

Personal information
- Born: August 15, 1987 (age 39) Maputo
- Listed height: 190 cm (6.2 ft)

Career history
- 2007: Olivais
- 2007–2012: Ferroviário de Maputo
- 2012–2014: Primeiro de Agosto
- 2014–present: Ferroviário de Maputo

Deolinda Mulói Gimo (born August 15, 1987), is a Mozambican basketball player. She is 190 cm (6 ft 3 in) tall and plays as a power forward/center.
