= Ugo Oha =

Nigerian-American basketball player

Personal information
- Born: July 18, 1982 (age 44) Houston, Texas, U.S.
- Listed height: 193 cm (6 ft 4 in)
- Position: Center
- Stats at Basketball Reference
Medals
Women's basketball
Representing Nigeria
African Games (All-Africa Games)
Silver medal – second place	2007 Algiers	Team
Bronze medal – third place	2011 Maputo	Team

Ugochukwu Henrietta Oha (born July 18, 1982, in Houston, Texas), known as Ugo Oha, is a Nigerian-American women's basketball player. She competed at the 2004 Summer Olympics with the Nigeria women's national basketball team and attended George Washington University. Oha attended Alief Hastings High School in Houston.

== George Washington statistics ==
Legend
GP	Games played	GS	Games started	MPG	Minutes per game
FG%	Field goal percentage	3P%	3-point field goal percentage	FT%	Free throw percentage
RPG	Rebounds per game	APG	Assists per game	SPG	Steals per game
BPG	Blocks per game	PPG	Points per game	**Bold**	Career high

Year	Team	GP	Points	FG%	3P%	FT%	RPG	APG	SPG	BPG	PPG
2000-01	George Washington	**32**	293	45.5	-	61.1	4.9	0.8	0.4	2.4	9.2
2001-02	George Washington	30	392	44.5	-	64.3	6.8	0.9	0.8	2.9	13.1
2002-03	George Washington	**32**	**499**	**51.3**	**25.0**	64.1	6.6	**1.2**	**0.8**	2.9	**15.6**
2003-04	George Washington	30	414	49.1	-	**70.1**	**7.1**	0.8	0.8	**3.3**	13.8
Career	George Washington	124	1598	47.9	14.3	65.0	6.3	0.9	0.7	2.9	12.9
