= Maria Afonso =

Portuguese noblewoman and nun (died 1320)

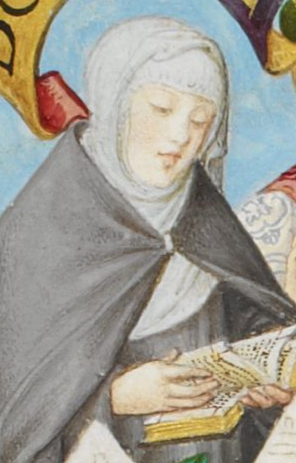
- Maria Afonso depicted in a 16th-century miniature
- Born: c. 1301
- Died: 1320 (aged 18–19)
- Cause of death: Murder
- Burial: Monastery of São Dinis de Odivelas
- House: Burgundy
- Father: Denis of Portugal
- Religion: Roman Catholicism
- Occupation: Nun

Maria Afonso (c. 1301 – 1320) was a Portuguese noblewoman and nun. The illegitimate daughter of King Denis, she was a nun at the Monastery of São Dinis de Odivelas, where she built an altar for Andrew the Apostle. She was murdered in 1320. The whereabouts of her remains have been subject to controversy. In 2022, she was portrayed in the Portuguese drama series A Rainha e a Bastarda, which was about her death and the subsequent investigation.

== Biography ==
Maria Afonso was the illegitimate daughter of Denis of Portugal. The identity of her mother has been debated upon by scholars. While some attribute Branca Lourenço de Valadares, a member of the noble Valladares family, as her mother, others say her mother was unknown. She was brought up in Odivelas, and is believed to have been born in 1301, based on a document dated that year that stated Denis granted her presumed mother, Branca Lourenço, the town of Mirandela "in exchange for her body". Her half-siblings were the legitimate Constance of Portugal and Afonso IV of Portugal, and the illegitimate Afonso Sanches, Pedro Afonso, João Afonso, Fernão Sanches, Maria Afonso, and another Pedro Afonso. Maria Afonso was the youngest child of Denis.

She became a nun at the Monastery of São Dinis de Odivelas at an unknown date, which her father had founded in 1295. During her time as nun, she helped build an altar for Andrew the Apostle.

== Death and burial ==
She died in 1320, and was buried at the Monastery at which she worked. She is believed to have been murdered in the Monastery, at around 20 years old.

A reliquary in the Epistle chapel of the Monastery was believed to have contained the remains of Maria. However, the reliquary was not decorated with items that would be typical of a woman like Maria, such as religious elements or veils. Historian Carla Varela Fernandes proposed that it actually held the remains of a son of Afonso IV of Portugal and his wife Beatrice of Castile, named John. He was Maria's nephew.

From a report from Borges de Figueiredo from when he opened the reliquary, it contained the remains of a child that was no older than a year of age and a child's coat. Varela Fernandes noted that the child's description matched that of John.

== Legacy ==
In 2022, Afonso was portrayed in the Portuguese drama series A Rainha e a Bastarda, which centers around the investigation into her murder.
