= Aïchata Diomande =

Ivorian basketball player

Personal information
- Born: July 17, 1984 (age 42) Treichville, Ivory Coast
- Listed height: 1.69 m (5 ft 7 in)
- Position: Point guard / shooting guard

Career history
- 2009-2013: Abidjan Basket Club

Aïchata Diomande (born July 17, 1984) is an Ivorian female professional basketball player.
