= 2011 FIBA Africa Championship for Women squads =

This article displays the rosters for the participating teams at the 2011 FIBA Africa Championship for Women.

== Group A ==
=== DR Congo ===
DR Congo women's national basketball team – 2011 FIBA Africa Championship – 7th place roster
Players
Coaches

Pos.	No.	Name	Age – Date of birth	Height	Club	Ctr.
	4	Kabown Kadidja	19 – 29 May 1992
	5	Gina Tebapale	29 – 16 October 1981
F	6	Jeanine Kalombo	27 – 16 February 1984		Radi	(Democratic Republic of the Congo)
F	7	Diane Mabibi	22 – 28 November 1988	1.77 m (5 ft 10 in)	Les Amitiés	(Democratic Republic of the Congo)
F	8	Monique Kanku	28 – 25 December 1982		Tourbillon	(Democratic Republic of the Congo)
	9	Natacha Teba	19 – 28 May 1992
	10	Mireille Nyota	21 – 2 February 1990
	11	Kikwiki Munono	32 – 30 July 1979
	12	Nelly Bopoli	32 – 16 July 1979
	13	Nicole Mubalo	18 – 5 November 1992
C	14	Ginette Makiese	23 – 20 April 1988		Arc-en-Ciel	(Democratic Republic of the Congo)
	15	Hortis Ahongi	23 – 10 October 1987

Head coach

- (Democratic Republic of the Congo) Joachim Monsengo

Assistant coach

- (Democratic Republic of the Congo) Lolango Mandole

Legend

- (C) Team captain
- Club field describes current club

=== Ghana ===
Ghana women's national basketball team – 2011 FIBA Africa Championship – 12th place roster
Players
Coaches

Pos.	No.	Name	Age – Date of birth	Height	Club	Ctr.
	4	Eva Alhassan	32 – 2 January 1979
	6	Balikisu Sadat	23 – 9 August 1988
	7	Annabelle Dsane	22 – 23 November 1988
	8	Memunatu Mumuni	23 – 30 October 1987
	9	Elizabeth Atebkah	19 – 17 November 1991
	10	Cynthia Sosavi	20 – 21 August 1991
	11	Grace Yinamyah	23 – 11 January 1988
	12	Georgina Ntow	25 – 31 July 1986
	14	Rahinatu Sulemana	33 – 24 September 1978

Head coach

Assistant coach

Legend

- (C) Team captain
- Club field describes current club

=== Ivory Coast ===
Ivory Coast women's national basketball team – 2011 FIBA Africa Championship – 8th place roster
Players
Coaches

Pos.	No.	Name	Age – Date of birth	Height	Club	Ctr.
	4	Amandine Binde	24 – 22 January 1987
	5	Maïmonatou Kolga	19 – 7 April 1992
	6	Stéphanie N'Garsanet	25 – 4 August 1986
	7	Salimata Berte	22 – 7 May 1989	1.80 m (5 ft 11 in)
	8	Amandine Bognini	27 – 10 July 1984
	9	Edjime Djedjemel	22 – 29 October 1988	1.88 m (6 ft 2 in)
	10	Kani Kouyaté	21 – 8 August 1990	1.75 m (5 ft 9 in)
	11	Massarami Meite	22 – 6 January 1989	1.75 m (5 ft 9 in)
	12	Awa Meite	25 – 10 April 1986	1.77 m (5 ft 10 in)
	13	Dénaïmou N'Garsanet	28 – 23 June 1983
	14	Mariama Kouyate	23 – 16 June 1988
	15	Minata Fofana	25 – 22 March 1986	1.92 m (6 ft 4 in)

Head coach

- (Ivory Coast) Souleymane Tembely

Assistant coach

- (Ivory Coast) Djadji Clement

Legend

- (C) Team captain
- Club field describes current club

=== Mali ===
Mali women's national basketball team – 2011 FIBA Africa Championship – Bronze Medal roster
Players
Coaches

Pos.	No.	Name	Age – Date of birth	Height	Club	Ctr.
	4	Nassira Traore	22 – 28 October 1988	1.81 m (5 ft 11 in)
	5	Aissata Maiga	19 – 21 March 1992	1.67 m (5 ft 6 in)
	6	Adizatou Maiga	27 – 30 October 1983	1.72 m (5 ft 8 in)
	7	Fatoumata Bagayoko	23 – 23 May 1988	1.70 m (5 ft 7 in)
	8	Diana Gandega	28 – 2 June 1983	1.70 m (5 ft 7 in)
	9	Hamchétou Maïga	33 – 25 April 1978	1.84 m (6 ft 0 in)
	10	Astan Dabo	19 – 30 May 1992	2.03 m (6 ft 8 in)
	11	Djene Diawara	26 – 29 January 1985	1.92 m (6 ft 4 in)	Flammes Carolo	(France)
	12	Naignouma Coulibaly	22 – 31 May 1989	1.92 m (6 ft 4 in)
	13	Meiya Tirera	25 – 15 April 1986	1.87 m (6 ft 2 in)
	14	Fanta Toure	22 – 18 February 1989
	15	Djenebou Sissoko	29 – 27 June 1982	1.84 m (6 ft 0 in)

Head coach

- (France) Jacques Vernerey

Assistant coach

Legend

- (C) Team captain
- Club field describes current club

=== Mozambique ===
Mozambique women's national basketball team – 2011 FIBA Africa Championship – 5th place roster
Players
Coaches

Pos.	No.	Name	Age – Date of birth	Height	Club	Ctr.
	4	Valerdina Manhonga	30 – 26 December 1980	1.68 m (5 ft 6 in)
	5	Deolinda Ngulela	30 – 18 April 1981	1.70 m (5 ft 7 in)
	6	Ana Flávia Azinheira	34 – 8 February 1977	1.84 m (6 ft 0 in)
	7	Anabela Cossa	25 – 7 April 1986	1.72 m (5 ft 8 in)
	8	Clarisse Machanguana	37 – 4 October 1973
	9	Cátia Halar	28 – 28 November 1982	1.72 m (5 ft 8 in)
	10	Filomena Micato	25 – 26 January 1986	1.68 m (5 ft 6 in)
	11	Leia Dongue	20 – 24 May 1991	1.85 m (6 ft 1 in)
	12	Rute Muianga	28 – 6 April 1983	1.75 m (5 ft 9 in)
	13	Ondina Nhampossa	32 – 18 June 1979	1.84 m (6 ft 0 in)
	14	Odélia Mafanela	22 – 14 April 1989	1.80 m (5 ft 11 in)
	15	Deolinda Gimo	24 – 15 August 1987	1.90 m (6 ft 3 in)

Head coach

- (Mozambique) Nasir Salé

Assistant coach

Legend

- (C) Team captain
- Club field describes current club

=== Tunisia ===
Tunisia women's national basketball team – 2011 FIBA Africa Championship – 10th place roster
Players
Coaches

Pos.	No.	Name	Age – Date of birth	Height	Club	Ctr.
	4	Khouloud Mefteh	20 – 5 January 1991
	5	Siwar Khlifa	22 – 11 January 1989
	6	Meriem Hamrouni	22 – 15 July 1989
	7	Hela Msadek	21 – 23 November 1989
	8	Maha Chelly	29 – 1 October 1982
	9	Rania Zineddine	22 – 9 July 1989
	10	Rim Gannar	29 – 20 May 1982
	11	Wafa Zaghdoud	27 – 5 October 1983
	12	Selma M'Nasria	24 – 11 October 1986
	13	Emma Jlida	23 – 25 March 1988
	14	Lilia Inoubli	19 – 15 February 1992
	15	Zbeyda Arami	20 – 6 April 1991

Head coach

Assistant coach

Legend

- (C) Team captain
- Club field describes current club

== Group B ==
=== Angola ===
Angola women's national basketball team – 2011 FIBA Africa Championship – Gold Medal roster
Players
Coaches

Pos.	No.	Name	Age – Date of birth	Height	Club	Ctr.
PG	4	Catarina Camufal	31 – 30 March 1980	1.68 m (5 ft 6 in)	Interclube	(Angola)
F	5	Luzia Simão	18 – 14 February 1993	1.83 m (6 ft 0 in)	Interclube	(Angola)
PG	6	Felizarda Jorge	26 – 23 February 1985	1.73 m (5 ft 8 in)	Primeiro de Agosto	(Angola)
SF	7	Ângela Cardoso	31 – 30 March 1980	1.80 m (5 ft 11 in)	Primeiro de Agosto	(Angola)
G	8	Fineza Eusébio	21 – 18 July 1990	1.78 m (5 ft 10 in)	Primeiro de Agosto	(Angola)
F	9	Cristina Matiquite	19 – 12 March 1992	1.78 m (5 ft 10 in)	Primeiro de Agosto	(Angola)
PF	10	Sónia Guadalupe	26 – 15 September 1985	1.88 m (6 ft 2 in)	Interclube	(Angola)
C	11	Luísa Tomás	28 – 24 March 1983	1.93 m (6 ft 4 in)	Interclube	(Angola)
SG	12	Astrida Vicente	32 – 6 October 1978	1.73 m (5 ft 8 in)	Interclube	(Angola)
SF	13	Nacissela Maurício (C)	31 – 2 June 1980	1.91 m (6 ft 3 in)	Primeiro de Agosto	(Angola)
PF	14	Nadir Manuel	24 – 30 November 1986	1.85 m (6 ft 1 in)	Interclube	(Angola)
SF	15	Ngiendula Filipe	29 – 20 May 1982	1.78 m (5 ft 10 in)	Interclube	(Angola)

Head coach

- (Angola) Aníbal Moreira

Assistant coach

- (Angola) Jacqueline Francisco

Legend

- (C) Team captain
- Club field describes current club

=== Cameroon ===
Cameroon women's national basketball team – 2011 FIBA Africa Championship – 6th place roster
Players
Coaches

Pos.	No.	Name	Age – Date of birth	Height	Club	Ctr.
	4	Marguerite Banbe	23 – 25 May 1988
	5	Priscilla Mbiandja	22 – 20 February 1989	1.73 m (5 ft 8 in)	ULM Warhawks	(United States)
	6	Astride Njiogap	23 – 23 August 1988
	7	Sandrine Datouo	22 – 30 September 1989
	8	Solange Ebondji	24 – 6 April 1987
	9	Clementine Elong	24 – 22 January 1987
	10	Anne Njike	25 – 24 July 1986
	11	Hermine Guotué	19 – 11 July 1992
	12	Sandrine Ayangma	20 – 25 October 1990
	13	Amina Njonkou (C)	23 – 6 April 1988
	14	Ramses Nimpa	22 – 20 January 1989
	15	Christine Nyobe	20 – 4 November 1990

Head coach

Assistant coach

Legend

- (C) Team captain
- Club field describes current club

=== Guinea ===
Guinea women's national basketball team – 2011 FIBA Africa Championship – 11th place roster
Players
Coaches

Pos.	No.	Name	Age – Date of birth	Height	Club	Ctr.
	4	Alimatou Koulibaly	17 – 29 July 1994
	5	Aminata Sylla	37 – 24 June 1974
	6	Kadiatou Camara	19 – 7 August 1992
	7	Djenabou Sylla	26 – 12 February 1985
	8	Khady Mbaye	29 – 6 November 1981
	9	Fatoumata Sylla	23 – 4 March 1988
	10	Mariama Touré	17 – 1 January 1994
	11	Moussougbe Sidibe (C)	19 – 1 January 1992
	12	Fanta Sidimé	18 – 1 January 1993
	13	Mariama Diallo	23 – 14 November 1987
	14	Simone Keita	17 – 26 March 1994
	15	Mireille Sylla	22 – 10 October 1988

Head coach

- (Senegal) Claude Constantino

Assistant coach

- (Guinea) Ousmane Sylla

Legend

- (C) Team captain
- Club field describes current club

=== Nigeria ===
Nigeria women's national basketball team – 2011 FIBA Africa Championship – 4th place roster
Players
Coaches

Pos.	No.	Name	Age – Date of birth	Height	Club	Ctr.
	4	Helen Ogunjimi	26 – 26 October 1984
	5	Nwamaka Adibeli	26 – 10 March 1985
	6	Rosalyn Onwude	24 – 28 April 1987
	7	Sarah Ogoke	21 – 25 June 1990
	8	Nkechi Akashili	21 – 22 February 1990
	9	Aisha Mohammed	25 – 21 October 1985	1.93 m (6 ft 4 in)
	10	Chinyere Ibekwe	23 – 2 December 1987
	11	Joyce Ekworomadu	25 – 6 August 1986
	12	Adeola Wylie	29 – 12 January 1982
	13	Rashidat Sadiq	30 – 3 January 1981
	14	Grace Okonkwo	24 – 20 October 1986
	15	Odonsi Iritei	25 – 25 June 1986

Head coach

Assistant coach

Legend

- (C) Team captain
- Club field describes current club

=== Rwanda ===
Rwanda women's national basketball team – 2011 FIBA Africa Championship – 9th place roster
Players
Coaches

Pos.	No.	Name	Age – Date of birth	Height	Club	Ctr.
	4	Scholastique Mukandayisenga	22 – 19 December 1988
	5	Honorée Ayebare	23 – 10 November 1987
	6	Angelica Williams	24 – 30 September 1987
	7	Laetitia Mahoro	22 – 29 September 1989
	8	Jovithe Kabarere	25 – 12 July 1986
	9	Tierra Henderson	24 – 6 May 1987
	10	Jackie Musabe	24 – 15 August 1987
	11	Joselyne Munyaneza	27 – 4 April 1984
	12	Liliane Kayitesi	26 – 5 March 1985
	13	Yvonne Kirenzi	28 – 5 March 1983
	14	Claudette Imanishimwe	29 – 26 May 1982
	15	Marie Flora	21 – 13 June 1990

Head coach

- (Croatia) Većeslav Kavedžija

Assistant coach

Legend

- (C) Team captain
- Club field describes current club

=== Senegal ===
Senegal women's national basketball team – 2011 FIBA Africa Championship – Silver Medal roster
Players
Coaches

Pos.	No.	Name	Age – Date of birth	Height	Club	Ctr.
	4	Oumoul Thiam	21 – 3 February 1990	1.83 m (6 ft 0 in)
G	5	Aya Traoré	28 – 27 July 1983	1.88 m (6 ft 2 in)	Liga Muçulmana	(Mozambique)
SG	6	Oumoul Sarr	27 – 25 January 1984	1.90 m (6 ft 3 in)
PG	7	Fatou Dieng	28 – 18 August 1983	1.68 m (5 ft 6 in)	Perpignan	(France)
F	8	Mame Diodio Diouf	26 – 15 December 1984	1.74 m (5 ft 9 in)	Abidjan Basket Club	(Ivory Coast)
	9	Ndèye Sène	23 – 18 January 1988		Club Sportif d'Abidjan	(Ivory Coast)
PF	10	Astou Traoré	30 – 30 April 1981	1.86 m (6 ft 1 in)	Dakar Université Club	(Senegal)
	11	Maimouna Diarra	20 – 30 January 1991		Saint Louis	(Senegal)
PF	12	Mame Marie Sy	26 – 25 March 1985	1.88 m (6 ft 2 in)	Union Lyon	(France)
C	13	Ndèye Ndiaye	32 – 2 May 1979	1.91 m (6 ft 3 in)
	14	Aminata Nar Diop	28 – 3 January 1983		Nantes-Rezé	(France)
	15	Jeanne Senghor	29 – 26 September 1982

Head coach

- (Senegal) Moustapha Gaye

Assistant coach

Legend

- (C) Team captain
- Club field describes current club

== See also ==
- 2011 FIBA Africa Women's Clubs Champions Cup squads
