= 2009 FIBA Africa Championship for Women squads =

This article displays the rosters for the participating teams at the 2009 FIBA Africa Championship for Women.

== Group A ==
=== Cameroon ===
Cameroon women's national basketball team – 2009 FIBA Africa Championship – 7th place roster
Players
Coaches

Pos.	No.	Name	Age – Date of birth	Height	Club	Ctr.
	4	Marie Mbick	22 – 3 September 1987
	5	Solange Ebondji	22 – 6 April 1987
	6	Astride Njiogap	21 – 23 August 1988	1.74 m (5 ft 9 in)
	7	Amina Njonkou	21 – 6 April 1988	1.81 m (5 ft 11 in)
	8	Madeleine Tetang	27 – 7 April 1982
	9	Annie Ngamou	35 – 5 July 1974
	10	Belle Bedihoune	27 – 26 November 1981
	11	Marguerite Ngo Banbe	21 – 25 May 1988
	12	Inès Nguimfack	24 – 2 April 1985
	13	Alina Jamen	21 – 17 July 1988	1.80 m (5 ft 11 in)
	14	Vivanne Djandjo	28 – 5 April 1981
	15	Alice Jamen	23 – 27 November 1985

Head coach

Assistant coach

Legend

- (C) Team captain
- Club field describes current club

=== Madagascar ===
Madagascar women's national basketball team – 2009 FIBA Africa Championship – 8th place roster
Players
Coaches

Pos.	No.	Name	Age – Date of birth	Height	Club	Ctr.
F	4	Belinda M'Boma	27 – 4 June 1982	1.74 m (5 ft 9 in)
	5	Debinirina Rakotonjanahary	33 – 6 July 1976
	6	Zafiliay Elina	21 – 28 April 1988
	7	Holy Lalaina Ranoroarisoa	24 – 5 February 1985
	8	Maiwenn Andriamilandy	26 – 12 July 1983
	9	Ange Rasoambolanoro	25 – 25 July 1984
	10	Prisca Razananirina	29 – 19 April 1980
	11	Phostina Papisy	28 – 21 February 1981
	12	Judith Fenoarisoa	28 – 5 March 1981
	13	Rokia Amady	25 – 28 September 1984
	14	Nahirae Solinasoa	24 – 15 September 1985
	15	Lydia Rasoanirina	37 – 10 September 1972

Head coach

Assistant coach

Legend

- (C) Team captain
- Club field describes current club

=== Mauritius ===
Mauritius women's national basketball team – 2009 FIBA Africa Championship – 12th place roster
Players
Coaches

Pos.	No.	Name	Age – Date of birth	Height	Club	Ctr.
	4	Karina Venketasawmy	24 – 8 June 1985
	5	Marie Nemorin	16 – 21 February 1993
	6	Madhavi Pem	20 – 12 May 1989
	7	Marie Permal	19 – 24 January 1990
	8	Loreen Davy	21 – 23 November 1987
	9	Marie Somauroo	25 – 10 January 1984
	10	Marie St Martin	21 – 25 August 1988
	11	Vanessa Spéville	22 – 15 January 1987
	12	Marie Josselin	17 – 23 August 1992
	13	Marie Labelle	25 – 22 March 1984
	14	Tatiana Rivière	22 – 13 January 1987
	15	Denise Benjamin	31 – 28 February 1978

Head coach

- [[]]

Assistant coach

Legend

- (C) Team captain
- Club field describes current club

=== Mozambique ===
Mozambique women's national basketball team – 2009 FIBA Africa Championship – 6th place roster
Players
Coaches

Pos.	No.	Name	Age – Date of birth	Height	Club	Ctr.
	4	Valerdina Manhonga	28 – 26 December 1980	1.68 m (5 ft 6 in)
	5	Filomena Micato	23 – 26 January 1986	1.68 m (5 ft 6 in)
	6	Ana Azinheira	32 – 8 February 1977	1.84 m (6 ft 0 in)
	7	Anabela Cossa	23 – 7 April 1986	1.72 m (5 ft 8 in)
	8	Ana Branquinho	29 – 2 February 1980
	9	Cátia Halar	26 – 28 November 1982	1.72 m (5 ft 8 in)
	10	Leia Dongue	18 – 24 May 1991	1.85 m (6 ft 1 in)
	11	Aleia Rachide	24 – 23 January 1985
	12	Amélia Macamo	24 – 23 September 1985
	13	Marta Gange	25 – 27 May 1984
	14	Odélia Mafanela	20 – 14 April 1989	1.80 m (5 ft 11 in)
	15	Ondina Nhampossa	30 – 18 June 1979	1.84 m (6 ft 0 in)

Head coach

- [[]]

Assistant coach

Legend

- (C) Team captain
- Club field describes current club

=== Senegal ===
Senegal women's national basketball team – 2009 FIBA Africa Championship – Gold Medal roster
Players
Coaches

Pos.	No.	Name	Age – Date of birth	Height	Club	Ctr.
	4	Fatou Thiam	26 – 15 February 1983
G	5	Aya Traoré	26 – 27 July 1983	1.84 m (6 ft 0 in)
F	6	Awa Gueye	31 – 31 August 1978	1.82 m (6 ft 0 in)
PG	7	Fatou Dieng	26 – 18 August 1983	1.67 m (5 ft 6 in)
F	8	Mame Diodio Diouf	24 – 15 December 1984	1.75 m (5 ft 9 in)
	9	Ndèye Sène	21 – 18 January 1988	1.61 m (5 ft 3 in)
	10	Fatoumata Diango	23 – 24 April 1986
	11	Aminata Dieye	24 – 21 January 1985
PF	12	Mame Marie Sy	24 – 25 March 1985	1.88 m (6 ft 2 in)
SG	13	Oumoul Sarr	25 – 25 January 1984	1.88 m (6 ft 2 in)
C	14	Aminata Nar Diop	26 – 3 January 1983	1.96 m (6 ft 5 in)
C	15	Bineta Diouf	30 – 13 November 1978	1.86 m (6 ft 1 in)

Head coach

- (Senegal) Moustapha Gaye

Assistant coach

Legend

- (C) Team captain
- Club field describes current club

=== South Africa ===
South Africa women's national basketball team – 2009 FIBA Africa Championship – 11th place roster
Players
Coaches

Pos.	No.	Name	Age – Date of birth	Height	Club	Ctr.
	4	Thobela Gatywa	22 – 13 September 1987
	5	Veranique Samuels	21 – 19 September 1988
	6	Emmerentia Ledwaba	30 – 7 February 1979
	7	Lungile Mtsweni	24 – 26 June 1985
	8	Gontse Molantoa	23 – 20 April 1986
	9	Tuki Modiselle	26 – 1 December 1982
	10	Ellen Moutlwatse	23 – 27 February 1986
	11	Requelh Molema	23 – 5 November 1985
	12	Nosipho Njokweni	28 – 25 March 1981
	13	Itumeleng Khoabane	22 – 16 August 1987
	14	Seipati Mokhati	26 – 22 January 1983
	15	Pumla Sathula	24 – 16 November 1984

Head coach

- [[]]

Assistant coach

- [[]]

Legend

- (C) Team captain
- Club field describes current club

== Group B ==
=== Angola ===
Angola women's national basketball team – 2009 FIBA Africa Championship – Bronze Medal roster
Players
Coaches

Pos.	No.	Name	Age – Date of birth	Height	Club	Ctr.
PG	4	Catarina Camufal	29 – 30 March 1980	1.67 m (5 ft 6 in)	Interclube	(Angola)
F	5	Ngiendula Filipe	27 – 20 May 1982	1.78 m (5 ft 10 in)	Interclube	(Angola)
PG	6	Domitila Ventura	30 – 28 November 1978	1.63 m (5 ft 4 in)	Primeiro de Agosto	(Angola)
SF	7	Felizarda Jorge	24 – 23 February 1985	1.80 m (5 ft 11 in)	Desportivo Maculusso	(Angola)
G	8	Isabel Francisco	29 – 21 July 1980	1.66 m (5 ft 5 in)	Primeiro de Agosto	(Angola)
F	9	Sónia Guadalupe	24 – 15 September 1985	1.88 m (6 ft 2 in)	Primeiro de Agosto	(Angola)
PF	10	Irene Guerreiro	39 – 10 September 1970	1.72 m (5 ft 8 in)	Interclube	(Angola)
C	11	Luísa Tomás	26 – 24 March 1983	1.93 m (6 ft 4 in)	Primeiro de Agosto	(Angola)
SG	12	Astrida Vicente	31 – 6 October 1978	1.73 m (5 ft 8 in)	Primeiro de Agosto	(Angola)
SF	13	Nacissela Maurício (C)	29 – 2 June 1980	1.86 m (6 ft 1 in)	Primeiro de Agosto	(Angola)
PF	14	Ernestina Neto	29 – 6 November 1979	1.85 m (6 ft 1 in)	Primeiro de Agosto	(Angola)
SF	15	Nadir Manuel	22 – 30 November 1986	1.85 m (6 ft 1 in)	Interclube	(Angola)

Head coach

- (Angola) Aníbal Moreira

Assistant coach

- (Angola) Elisa Pires

Legend

- (C) Team captain
- Club field describes current club

=== Ivory Coast ===
Ivory Coast women's national basketball team – 2009 FIBA Africa Championship – 4th place roster
Players
Coaches

Pos.	No.	Name	Age – Date of birth	Height	Club	Ctr.
	4	Salimata Berte	20 – 7 May 1989	1.80 m (5 ft 11 in)
	5	Mariam Kolga	26 – 31 May 1983
	6	Assétou Kolga	21 – 24 April 1988
	7	Awa Kone	21 – 21 March 1988
C	8	Minata Fofana	23 – 22 March 1986	1.92 m (6 ft 4 in)
	9	Edjime Djedjemel	20 – 29 October 1988	1.88 m (6 ft 2 in)
	10	Kani Kouyaté	19 – 8 August 1990	1.75 m (5 ft 9 in)
	11	Adjheï Abbady	22 – 17 June 1987
	12	Mariam Gbane	27 – 16 April 1982
	13	Mariama Kouyate	21 – 16 June 1988
	14	Dénaïmou N'Garsanet	26 – 23 June 1983
	8	Stéphanie N'Garsanet	23 – 4 August 1986

Head coach

- (France) Simon Guillou

Assistant coach

- (Ivory Coast) Siaka Coulibaly

Legend

- (C) Team captain
- Club field describes current club

=== Mali ===
Mali women's national basketball team – 2009 FIBA Africa Championship – Silver Medal roster
Players
Coaches

Pos.	No.	Name	Age – Date of birth	Height	Club	Ctr.
G	4	Kadia Touré	26 – 18 January 1983	1.80 m (5 ft 11 in)
	5	Aissata Maiga	17 – 21 March 1992	1.68 m (5 ft 6 in)
G	6	Mariatou Diarra	23 – 20 November 1985	1.78 m (5 ft 10 in)
	7	Nassira Traore	20 – 28 October 1988	1.81 m (5 ft 11 in)
	8	Diana Gandega	26 – 2 June 1983	1.70 m (5 ft 7 in)
	9	Hamchétou Maïga	31 – 25 April 1978	1.84 m (6 ft 0 in)
C	10	Naignouma Coulibaly	20 – 31 May 1989	1.92 m (6 ft 4 in)
C	11	Djene Diawara	24 – 29 January 1985	1.92 m (6 ft 4 in)
	12	Meiya Tirera	23 – 15 April 1986	1.87 m (6 ft 2 in)
F	13	Mariam Sy	30 – 13 September 1979	1.88 m (6 ft 2 in)
C	14	Aminata Sininta	23 – 23 December 1985
F	15	Djenebou Sissoko	27 – 27 June 1982	1.84 m (6 ft 0 in)

Head coach

Assistant coach

Legend

- (C) Team captain
- Club field describes current club

=== Nigeria ===
Nigeria women's national basketball team – 2009 FIBA Africa Championship – 5th place roster
Players
Coaches

Pos.	No.	Name	Age – Date of birth	Height	Club	Ctr.
	4	Nwamaka Adibeli	24 – 10 March 1985
	5	Charity Szczechowiak	24 – 30 April 1985
	6	Erdoo Angwe	22 – 19 March 1987
	7	Tamunomiete Whyte	21 – 28 May 1988
	8	Funmilayo Ojelabi	24 – 25 January 1985
	9	Magdalene Ukato	23 – 12 February 1986
	10	Vivian Ewalefo	24 – 9 May 1985
F	11	Mfon Udoka	33 – 16 June 1976	1.90 m (6 ft 3 in)
F	12	Rashidat Sadiq	28 – 3 January 1981	1.88 m (6 ft 2 in)
C	13	Makbule Amachree	31 – 30 January 1978	1.90 m (6 ft 3 in)
	14	Priscilla Udeaja	25 – 29 June 1984
	15	Adeola Wylie	27 – 12 January 1982

Head coach

- (Nigeria) Ayo Bakare

Assistant coach

- (Nigeria) Scott Nnaji
- (Nigeria) Andrew Isokpehi

Legend

- (C) Team captain
- Club field describes current club

=== Rwanda ===
Rwanda women's national basketball team – 2009 FIBA Africa Championship – 9th place roster
Players
Coaches

Pos.	No.	Name	Age – Date of birth	Height	Club	Ctr.
	4	Jovithe Kabarere	23 – 12 July 1986
	5	Angelica Williams	22 – 30 September 1987
	6	Mireille Karangwa	30 – 6 June 1979
	7	Alice Muhongerwa	23 – 21 October 1985
	8	Sabine Mugeni	24 – 27 August 1985
	10	Honorée Ayebare	21 – 10 November 1987
	11	Laetitia Mahoro	20 – 29 September 1989
	12	Colombe Martin	20 – 27 January 1989
	13	Tatum Brown	31 – 13 July 1978
	14	Claudette Imanishimwe	27 – 26 May 1982
	15	Takisha Grandberry	23 – 21 February 1986

Head coach

- (Croatia) Većeslav Kavedžija

Assistant coach

Legend

- (C) Team captain
- Club field describes current club

=== Tunisia ===
Tunisia women's national basketball team – 2009 FIBA Africa Championship – 10th place roster
Players
Coaches

Pos.	No.	Name	Age – Date of birth	Height	Club	Ctr.
C	4	Mariem Ouertani	21 – 10 November 1987	1.88 m (6 ft 2 in)
	5	Khouloud Mefteh	18 – 5 January 1991
	6	Meriem Hamrouni	20 – 15 July 1989
	7	Fatma Zagrouba	27 – 21 February 1982
	8	Maha Chelly	27 – 1 October 1982
	9	Thouraya Adsi	27 – 4 May 1982
	10	Rim Gannar	27 – 20 May 1982
G	11	Nedra Dhouibi	22 – 3 September 1987	1.72 m (5 ft 8 in)
C	12	Selma M'Nasria	23 – 11 October 1986	1.90 m (6 ft 3 in)
	13	Zbeyda Arami	18 – 6 April 1991
	14	Lilia Inoubli	17 – 15 February 1992
	15	Hela Msadek	19 – 23 November 1989

Head coach

Assistant coach

Legend

- (C) Team captain
- Club field describes current club

== See also ==
- 2009 FIBA Africa Women's Clubs Champions Cup squads
