= 2013 FIBA Africa Championship for Women squads =

This article displays the rosters for the participating teams at the 2013 FIBA Africa Championship for Women.

== Group A ==
=== Algeria ===
Algeria women's national basketball team – 2013 FIBA Africa Championship – 11th place roster
Players
Coaches

Pos.	No.	Name	Age – Date of birth	Height	Club	Ctr.
	4	Nadia Isli	30 – 14 March 1983		GS Pétroliers
	5	Nesrine Taïbi	25 – 28 June 1988
	6	Ikbal Chenaf	20 – 21 September 1993
	7	Samiya Boudjerima	25 – 26 April 1988
	8	Rachida Belaidi	33 – 28 November 1979
	9	Shahnez Boushaki	27 – 22 October 1985
	10	Sofia Saidani	21 – 5 January 1992
	11	Nesrine Boukerma	19 – 16 February 1994
	12	Lilia Refes	18 – 11 February 1995
	13	Yasmine Meribout	19 – 25 March 1994
	14	Wahiba Aissani	34 – 2 January 1979
	15	Meriem Madoui	32 – 9 February 1981

Head coach

Assistant coach

Legend

- (C) Team captain
- Club field describes current club

=== Egypt ===
Egypt women's national basketball team – 2013 FIBA Africa Championship – 8th place roster
Players
Coaches

Pos.	No.	Name	Age – Date of birth	Height	Club	Ctr.
G	4	Sara Aly	28 – 1 March 1985	1.61 m (5 ft 3 in)
F	5	Menatalla Awad	22 – 10 September 1991	1.75 m (5 ft 9 in)
C	6	May Helwa	24 – 2 January 1989	1.83 m (6 ft 0 in)	Sporting Alexandria	(Egypt)
G	7	Shaza Gaballah	20 – 16 November 1992	1.74 m (5 ft 9 in)
C	8	Danah Salameh	18 – 22 May 1995	1.87 m (6 ft 2 in)
F	9	Aliaa Gamal	30 – 14 September 1983	1.79 m (5 ft 10 in)
F	10	Dina Amr	19 – 15 December 1993	1.73 m (5 ft 8 in)
G	11	Reem Osama	20 – 28 June 1993	1.71 m (5 ft 7 in)
F	12	Dina Sherif	22 – 1 August 1991	1.82 m (6 ft 0 in)
C	13	Engy Afify	21 – 23 June 1992	1.91 m (6 ft 3 in)
F	14	Hagar Amer	19 – 10 November 1993	1.82 m (6 ft 0 in)	Sporting Alexandria	(Egypt)
F	15	Nouralla Mostafa	22 – 3 February 1991	1.78 m (5 ft 10 in)	Sporting Alexandria	(Egypt)

Head coach

- (Egypt) Hesham Zayany

Assistant coach

Legend

- (C) Team captain
- Club field describes current club

=== Ivory Coast ===
Ivory Coast women's national basketball team – 2013 FIBA Africa Championship – 7th place roster
Players
Coaches

Pos.	No.	Name	Age – Date of birth	Height	Club	Ctr.
G	4	Fatoumata Koné	25 – 7 September 1988	1.67 m (5 ft 6 in)	Abidjan Basket Club	(Ivory Coast)
	5	Saran Camara	21 – 20 December 1991		Club Sportif d'Abidjan	(Ivory Coast)
	6	Mamiky Cisse	21 – 16 December 1991		Abidjan Basket Club	(Ivory Coast)
	7	Fatou Diabate	38 – 12 March 1975		Abidjan Basket Club	(Ivory Coast)
	8	Kariata Diaby	18 – 29 June 1995
	9	Salimata Berte	24 – 7 May 1989	1.80 m (5 ft 11 in)	Abidjan Basket Club	(Ivory Coast)
SG	10	Kani Kouyaté	23 – 8 August 1990	1.78 m (5 ft 10 in)	Club Sportif d'Abidjan	(Ivory Coast)
G	11	Aïchata Diomande	29 – 17 July 1984	1.69 m (5 ft 7 in)	Abidjan Basket Club	(Ivory Coast)
	12	Edjime Djedjemel	24 – 29 October 1988	1.88 m (6 ft 2 in)	Club Sportif d'Abidjan	(Ivory Coast)
	13	Massarami Meite	24 – 6 January 1989	1.75 m (5 ft 9 in)
	14	Awa Meite	27 – 10 April 1986	1.77 m (5 ft 10 in)
	15	Minata Fofana	27 – 22 March 1986	1.92 m (6 ft 4 in)	Club Sportif d'Abidjan	(Ivory Coast)

Head coach

- (Ivory Coast) Djadji Clement

Assistant coach

- (Ivory Coast) Patricia Lorougnon

Legend

- (C) Team captain
- Club field describes current club

=== Mozambique ===
Mozambique women's national basketball team – 2013 FIBA Africa Championship – Silver Medal roster
Players
Coaches

Pos.	No.	Name	Age – Date of birth	Height	Club	Ctr.
G	4	Valerdina Manhonga	32 – 26 December 1980	1.68 m (5 ft 6 in)	Liga Muçulmana	(Mozambique)
G	5	Deolinda Ngulela	32 – 18 April 1981	1.72 m (5 ft 8 in)	Liga Muçulmana	(Mozambique)
F	6	Ana Flávia Azinheira	36 – 8 February 1977	1.88 m (6 ft 2 in)	Politécnica	(Mozambique)
G	7	Anabela Cossa	27 – 7 April 1986	1.72 m (5 ft 8 in)	Liga Muçulmana	(Mozambique)
C	8	Clarisse Machanguana (C)	39 – 4 October 1973	1.97 m (6 ft 6 in)	Liga Muçulmana	(Mozambique)
F	9	Cátia Halar	30 – 28 November 1982	1.72 m (5 ft 8 in)	Liga Muçulmana	(Mozambique)
F	10	Filomena Micato	27 – 26 January 1986	1.70 m (5 ft 7 in)	Liga Muçulmana	(Mozambique)
C	11	Leia Dongue	22 – 24 May 1991	1.87 m (6 ft 2 in)	Primeiro de Agosto	(Angola)
F	12	Rute Muianga	30 – 6 April 1983	1.77 m (5 ft 10 in)	Liga Muçulmana	(Mozambique)
C	13	Cecília Henriques	23 – 24 August 1990	1.80 m (5 ft 11 in)	Politécnica	(Mozambique)
C	14	Odélia Mafanela	24 – 14 April 1989	1.84 m (6 ft 0 in)	Liga Muçulmana	(Mozambique)
C	15	Deolinda Gimo	26 – 15 August 1987	1.89 m (6 ft 2 in)	Primeiro de Agosto	(Angola)

Head coach

- (Mozambique) Nazir Salé

Assistant coach

Legend

- (C) Team captain
- Club field describes current club

=== Senegal ===
Senegal women's national basketball team – 2013 FIBA Africa Championship – Bronze Medal roster
Players
Coaches

Pos.	No.	Name	Age – Date of birth	Height	Club	Ctr.
	4	Oumoul Thiam	23 – 3 February 1990	1.83 m (6 ft 0 in)	Crimson Storm	(United States)
G	5	Aya Traoré	30 – 27 July 1983	1.88 m (6 ft 2 in)	Liga Muçulmana	(Mozambique)
SG	6	Oumoul Sarr	29 – 25 January 1984	1.90 m (6 ft 3 in)	Uni. Pais Vasco	(Spain)
PG	7	Fatou Dieng	30 – 18 August 1983	1.68 m (5 ft 6 in)	Perpignan	(France)
F	8	Mame Diodio Diouf	28 – 15 December 1984	1.74 m (5 ft 9 in)	Abidjan Basket Club	(Ivory Coast)
	9	Ndèye Sène	25 – 18 January 1988		Saint Louis	(Senegal)
PF	10	Astou Traoré	32 – 30 April 1981	1.86 m (6 ft 1 in)	Saint-Amand Hainaut	(France)
	11	Maimouna Diarra	22 – 30 January 1991		Saint Louis	(Senegal)
PF	12	Mame Marie Sy	28 – 25 March 1985	1.88 m (6 ft 2 in)	Union Lyon	(France)
C	13	Ndèye Ndiaye	34 – 2 May 1979	1.91 m (6 ft 3 in)
	14	Aminata Nar Diop	30 – 3 January 1983		Roche Vendée	(France)
	15	Jeanne Senghor	31 – 26 September 1982

Head coach

- (Senegal) Pape Moussa Touré

Assistant coach

Legend

- (C) Team captain
- Club field describes current club

=== Zimbabwe ===
Zimbabwe women's national basketball team – 2013 FIBA Africa Championship – 12th place roster
Players
Coaches

Pos.	No.	Name	Age – Date of birth	Height	Club	Ctr.
SF	4	Fadzai Masaba	30 – 7 May 1983	1.73 m (5 ft 8 in)	VUT Basketball	(South Africa)
G	5	Margaret Magwaro	29 – 30 October 1983	1.62 m (5 ft 4 in)	Cameo	(Zimbabwe)
SG	6	Resina Chisale	31 – 16 April 1982	1.71 m (5 ft 7 in)	Soweto Raptors	(South Africa)
G	7	Geraldine Chibonda	27 – 16 December 1985	1.70 m (5 ft 7 in)	Giants	(Zimbabwe)
PG	8	Serina Chareka	24 – 17 November 1988	1.59 m (5 ft 3 in)	JBC	(Zimbabwe)
PG	9	Margaret Kanyimo	24 – 19 July 1989	1.59 m (5 ft 3 in)	Raiders	(Zimbabwe)
G	10	Cleopatra Manda	27 – 14 January 1986	1.71 m (5 ft 7 in)	Lakers	(Zimbabwe)
C	11	Dorcas Marondera	23 – 10 September 1990	1.76 m (5 ft 9 in)	VUT Basketball	(South Africa)
G	12	Sharon Chamwarura	20 – 29 September 1993	1.71 m (5 ft 7 in)	JBC	(Zimbabwe)
G	13	Pretty Tinarwo	29 – 16 November 1983	1.76 m (5 ft 9 in)	Highlanders	(Zimbabwe)
F	14	Patience Chinhoyi	30 – 3 March 1983	1.80 m (5 ft 11 in)	Mbada Amazons	(Zimbabwe)

Head coach

Assistant coach

Legend

- (C) Team captain
- Club field describes current club

== Group B ==
=== Angola ===
Angola women's national basketball team – 2013 FIBA Africa Championship – Gold Medal roster
Players
Coaches

Pos.	No.	Name	Age – Date of birth	Height	Club	Ctr.
PG	4	Catarina Camufal	33 – 30 March 1980	1.68 m (5 ft 6 in)	Interclube	(Angola)
SF	5	Clarisse Mpaka	29 – 25 February 1984	1.76 m (5 ft 9 in)	Interclube	(Angola)
PG	6	Felizarda Jorge	28 – 23 February 1985	1.73 m (5 ft 8 in)	Primeiro de Agosto	(Angola)
F/C	7	Whitney Miguel	21 – 30 September 1991	1.85 m (6 ft 1 in)	Léon Trégor B29	(France)
G	8	Fineza Eusébio	23 – 18 July 1990	1.78 m (5 ft 10 in)	Primeiro de Agosto	(Angola)
F	9	Madalena Felix	24 – 20 September 1989	1.78 m (5 ft 10 in)	Primeiro de Agosto	(Angola)
PF	10	Sónia Guadalupe	28 – 15 September 1985	1.88 m (6 ft 2 in)	Interclube	(Angola)
C	11	Luísa Tomás	30 – 24 March 1983	1.93 m (6 ft 4 in)	Primeiro de Agosto	(Angola)
SG	12	Astrida Vicente	34 – 6 October 1978	1.73 m (5 ft 8 in)	Interclube	(Angola)
SF	13	Nacissela Maurício (C)	33 – 2 June 1980	1.91 m (6 ft 3 in)	Primeiro de Agosto	(Angola)
PF	14	Nadir Manuel	26 – 30 November 1986	1.85 m (6 ft 1 in)	Interclube	(Angola)
SF	15	Ngiendula Filipe	31 – 20 May 1982	1.78 m (5 ft 10 in)	Interclube	(Angola)

Head coach

- (Angola) Aníbal Moreira

Assistant coach

- (Angola) Elisa Pires

Legend

- (C) Team captain
- Club field describes current club

=== Cameroon ===
Cameroon women's national basketball team – 2013 FIBA Africa Championship – 4th place roster
Players
Coaches

Pos.	No.	Name	Age – Date of birth	Height	Club	Ctr.
G	4	Marie Sibekono	19 – 15 July 1994	1.73 m (5 ft 8 in)	INJS	(Cameroon)
G	5	Priscilla Mbiandja	24 – 20 February 1989	1.73 m (5 ft 8 in)
F	6	Astride Njiogap	25 – 23 August 1988	1.74 m (5 ft 9 in)	INJS	(Cameroon)
F	7	Amina Njonkou	25 – 6 April 1988	1.81 m (5 ft 11 in)
F	8	Olivia Ouako	26 – 16 February 1987	1.82 m (6 ft 0 in)	Nobless Ladies	(Cameroon)
G	9	Ramses Nimpa	24 – 20 January 1989	1.75 m (5 ft 9 in)
F	10	Alina Jamen	25 – 17 July 1988	1.80 m (5 ft 11 in)
C	11	Hermine Guotué	21 – 11 July 1992	1.93 m (6 ft 4 in)	INJS	(Cameroon)
G	12	Edith Tosom	26 – 29 October 1986	1.70 m (5 ft 7 in)	INJS	(Cameroon)
F	13	Florence Avébé	25 – 5 March 1988	1.85 m (6 ft 1 in)
F	14	Catherine Yenou	26 – 21 July 1987	1.85 m (6 ft 1 in)	INJS	(Cameroon)
C	15	Françoise Tafen	26 – 23 November 1986	1.90 m (6 ft 3 in)

Head coach

- (Cameroon) Alain Zedong

Assistant coach

Legend

- (C) Team captain
- Club field describes current club

=== Cape Verde ===
Cape Verde women's national basketball team – 2013 FIBA Africa Championship – 9th place roster
Players
Coaches

Pos.	No.	Name	Age – Date of birth	Height	Club	Ctr.
	4	Jade Leitão	30 – 13 July 1983	1.80 m (5 ft 11 in)	Elite Greensboro	(United States)
	7	Vandell Andrade	20 – 20 April 1993	1.81 m (5 ft 11 in)	Rhode Island College	(United States)
	8	Mireille Lima	30 – 28 August 1983	1.83 m (6 ft 0 in)	Académica Mindelo	(Cape Verde)
C	9	Djeniffer Monteiro	22 – 30 April 1991	1.92 m (6 ft 4 in)	Sporting Lisboa	(Portugal)
	10	Áurea Mendes	23 – 26 July 1990	1.86 m (6 ft 1 in)
	11	Juvelina Bento	24 – 27 October 1988	1.76 m (5 ft 9 in)	ABC Santiago	(Cape Verde)
	12	Lorreta Rocha	21 – 10 January 1992	1.78 m (5 ft 10 in)	SNHU Penmen	(United States)
	13	Aylin Pires	24 – 8 June 1989	1.83 m (6 ft 0 in)	ABC Santiago	(Cape Verde)
	14	Ornela Livramento	23 – 15 April 1990		Liceu Basket	(Cape Verde)
C	15	Crispina Correia	37 – 5 November 1975	1.91 m (6 ft 3 in)

Head coach

- (Cape Verde) António "Zola" Moreira

Assistant coach

Legend

- (C) Team captain
- Club field describes current club

=== Kenya ===
Kenya women's national basketball team – 2013 FIBA Africa Championship – 10th place roster
Players
Coaches

Pos.	No.	Name	Age – Date of birth	Height	Club	Ctr.
	4	Grace Wango'Ndu	28 – 26 October 1984		Strathmore University
	5	Emma Nyakweba	20 – 21 April 1993		USIU Flames	(Kenya)
	6	Angela Okoth	23 – 30 September 1989		Eagle Wings	(Kenya)
	7	Samba Mjomba	23 – 25 June 1990		Eagle Wings	(Kenya)
	8	Hilda Indasi	23 – 22 February 1990		USIU Flames	(Kenya)
	9	Brenda Angeshi	26 – 20 October 1986		KPA	(Kenya)
	10	Susan Akinyi	27 – 12 February 1986		Storms	(Kenya)
	11	Silalei Shani	27 – 6 August 1986		Eagle Wings	(Kenya)
	12	Rose Ouma	24 – 17 March 1989		Al Nasr	(United Arab Emirates)
	13	Belinda Okoth	32 – 3 January 1981
	14	Vilma Akinyi	29 – 29 June 1984		Eagle Wings	(Kenya)
	15	Purity Auma	23 – 28 June 1990	1.91 m (6 ft 3 in)	UCU	(Rwanda)

Head coach

Assistant coach

Legend

- (C) Team captain
- Club field describes current club

=== Mali ===
Mali women's national basketball team – 2013 FIBA Africa Championship – 5th place roster
Players
Coaches

Pos.	No.	Name	Age – Date of birth	Height	Club	Ctr.
	4	Nassira Traore	24 – 28 October 1988	1.81 m (5 ft 11 in)	Stade Malien	(Mali)
	5	Aissata Maiga	21 – 21 March 1992	1.67 m (5 ft 6 in)
	6	Awa Diallo	22 – 19 November 1990		Stade Malien	(Mali)
	7	Fatoumata Bagayoko	25 – 23 May 1988	1.70 m (5 ft 7 in)	Stade Malien	(Mali)
	8	Kankou Coulibaly	23 – 11 April 1990	1.85 m (6 ft 1 in)	Stade Malien	(Mali)
	9	Aminata Sissoko	20 – 5 May 1993	1.62 m (5 ft 4 in)	Djoliba	(Mali)
	10	Fanta Guindo	19 – 8 May 1994	1.67 m (5 ft 6 in)	Djoliba	(Mali)
	11	Djene Diawara	28 – 29 January 1985	1.92 m (6 ft 4 in)	Villeneuve-d'Ascq	(France)
	12	Naignouma Coulibaly	24 – 31 May 1989	1.92 m (6 ft 4 in)	Arras	(France)
	13	Meiya Tireira	27 – 15 April 1986	1.87 m (6 ft 2 in)	Sfaxien	(Tunisia)
	14	Ouleymatou Coulibaly	23 – 15 July 1990		Bizerte	(Tunisia)
	15	Farima Toure	20 – 10 August 1993	1.84 m (6 ft 0 in)

Head coach

- (France) José Ruiz

Assistant coach

Legend

- (C) Team captain
- Club field describes current club

=== Nigeria ===
Nigeria women's national basketball team – 2013 FIBA Africa Championship – 6th place roster
Players
Coaches

Pos.	No.	Name	Age – Date of birth	Height	Club	Ctr.
G	4	Helen Ogunjimi	28 – 26 October 1984	1.76 m (5 ft 9 in)	First Bank	(Nigeria)
G	5	Upe Atosu	20 – 21 April 1993	1.73 m (5 ft 8 in)	First Deepwater	(Nigeria)
F	6	Justina Udenze	23 – 30 September 1989	1.91 m (6 ft 3 in)	Gimle BBK Bergen	(Norway)
G	7	Sarah Ogoke	23 – 25 June 1990	1.73 m (5 ft 8 in)	First Deepwater	(Nigeria)
G	8	Nkechi Akashili	23 – 22 February 1990	1.76 m (5 ft 9 in)	First Deepwater	(Nigeria)
C	9	Grace Okonkwo	26 – 20 October 1986	1.94 m (6 ft 4 in)	First Bank	(Nigeria)
F	10	Magdalene Ukato	27 – 12 February 1986	1.85 m (6 ft 1 in)	First Deepwater	(Nigeria)
G	11	Joyce Ekworomadu	27 – 6 August 1986	1.73 m (5 ft 8 in)	First Bank	(Nigeria)
F	12	Ndidi Madu	24 – 17 March 1989	1.91 m (6 ft 3 in)	CB Al-Qazeres	(Spain)
F	13	Rashidat Sadiq (C)	32 – 3 January 1981	1.85 m (6 ft 1 in)	First Bank	(Nigeria)
C	14	Priscilla Udeaja	29 – 29 June 1984	1.91 m (6 ft 3 in)	First Deepwater	(Nigeria)
F	15	Tolu Omotola	23 – 28 June 1990	1.91 m (6 ft 3 in)

Head coach

- (Nigeria) Scott Nnaji

Assistant coach

Legend

- (C) Team captain
- Club field describes current club

== See also ==
- 2013 FIBA Africa Women's Clubs Champions Cup squads
