= 2011 FIBA Africa Championship for Women =

2011 FIBA Women's AfroBasket
20th FIBA Women's African Basketball Championship

Tournament details
- Host country: Mali
- Dates: September 23–October 2
- Teams: 12 (from 53 federations)
- Venue: 1 (in 1 host city)

Final positions
- Champions: Angola (1st title)

Tournament statistics
- MVP: (Angola) Nacissela Maurício
- Top scorer: (Rwanda) Henderson 17.7
- Top rebounds: (Mozambique) Leia 10.2
- Top assists: (Senegal) Diouf 4.4
- PPG (Team): Senegal 78.1
- RPG (Team): Mali 38.8
- APG (Team): Senegal 18

Official website
- Official Website

The 2011 FIBA Africa Championship for Women (alternatively the FIBA African Championship) was the 20th FIBA Africa Championship for Women, played under the auspices of the Fédération Internationale de Basketball, the basketball sport governing body, and the African zone thereof. At stake was the berth allocated to Africa in the 2012 Summer Olympics basketball tournament. The tournament was held from September 23–October 2 in Mali.

== Format ==
- The 12 teams were divided into two groups (Groups A+B) for the preliminary round.
- Round robin for the preliminary round; the top four teams advanced to the quarterfinals.
- From there on a knockout system was used until the final.

== Draw ==
The draw was held on 26 June 2011 in Bamako, Mali.

Group A	Group B
DR Congo; Ghana; Ivory Coast; Mali; Mozambique; Tunisia	Angola; Cameroon; Guinea; Nigeria; Rwanda; Senegal

== Preliminary round ==
=== Group A ===
Qualified for the quarter-finals

Team	Pld	W	L	PF	PA	PD	Pts
Mali	5	5	0	364	219	+145	10
Mozambique	5	4	1	363	283	+80	9
Ivory Coast	5	2	3	338	261	+77	7
DR Congo	5	2	3	308	292	+16	7
Tunisia	5	2	3	226	260	−34	7
Ghana	5	0	5	127	411	−284	4

23 September 2011
13:00

Boxscore

Ivory Coast	65–69 (OT)	Mozambique
Scoring by quarter: 15–11, 12–16, 15–19, 16–12, Overtime: 7–11
Pts: K.Kouyate 23; Rebs: Berte 6 Asts: M.Kouyate 3		Pts: Leia 13; Rebs: Leia 12; Asts: Deolinda 4

Stade 26 mars, Bamako

23 September 2011
18:00

Boxscore

Mali	69–45	Tunisia
Scoring by quarter: 19–5, 17–12, 20–13, 13–15
Pts: Sissoko 15; Rebs: Sissoko 13; Asts: three players 2		Pts: Hamrouni 11; Rebs: Khalifa 8 Asts: Hamrouni 3

Pavillon des sports, Bamako

24 September 2011
14:00

Ghana	0–20	Tunisia
Scoring by quarter: n/a
Pts: n/a		Pts: n/a

Pavillon des sports, Bamako

24 September 2011
14:00

Boxscore

Mozambique	76–55	DR Congo
Scoring by quarter: 25–17, 18–12, 17–15, 16–11
Pts: Leia 20; Rebs: Leia 11; Asts: Deolinda 2		Pts: Makiese 19; Rebs: Nyota 8 Asts: Kalombo 5

Stade 26 mars, Bamako

24 September 2011
18:00

Boxscore

Ivory Coast	44–57	Mali
Scoring by quarter: 12–14, 12–14, 10–16, 10–13
Pts: Kouyate 14; Rebs: Fofana 4 Asts: three players 2		Pts: Tirera, Sissoko 14; Rebs: Sissoko 9 Asts: Diawara 4

Stade 26 mars, Bamako

25 September 2011
14:00

Boxscore

Mozambique	69–53	Tunisia
Scoring by quarter: 22-7, 13-18, 17-20, 17-8
Pts: Leia 18; Rebs: Leia 10; Asts: Deolinda 4		Pts: Inoubli 11; Rebs: Hamrouni 9 Asts: Zaghdoud 2

Pavillon des sports, Bamako

25 September 2011
18:00

Boxscore

Mali	95–30	Ghana
Scoring by quarter: 21-6, 18-7, 27-5, 29-12
Pts: Diawara; Rebs: Diawara; Asts: Bagayoko		Pts: Mumuni; Rebs: Atebkah; Asts: Atebkah

Stade 26 mars, Bamako

25 September 2011
20:00

Boxscore

DR Congo	59–54	Ivory Coast
Scoring by quarter: 15-22, 9-9, 18-13, 17-10
Pts: Makiese 20; Rebs: Bopoli 8 Asts: Kalombo 3		Pts: M.Kouyate 17; Rebs: N'Garsanet, M.Kouyate 6 Asts: K.Kouyate 4

Stade 26 mars, Bamako

26 September 2011
16:00

Boxscore

Ghana	37–89	DR Congo
Scoring by quarter: 8-22, 15-24, 8-26, 6-17
Pts: Atebkah 13; Rebs: Sadat 6 Asts: Yinamyah 2		Pts: Ahongi 15; Rebs: Ahongi 11; Asts: three players 2

Pavillon des sports, Bamako

27 September 2011
14:00

Boxscore

Ivory Coast	101–23	Ghana
Scoring by quarter: 24-4, 30-7, 21-7, 26-5
Pts: M.Meite 21; Rebs: Djedjemel 7 Asts: N'Garsanet 6		Pts: Yinamyah 6 Rebs: Ntow 10; Asts: Yinamyah 1

Pavillon des sports, Bamako

27 September 2011
18:00

Boxscore

Mali	73–43	Mozambique
Scoring by quarter: 10-14, 17-8, 26-13, 20-8
Pts: Sissoko 21; Rebs: Diawara 9 Asts: Traore 4		Pts: Leia; Rebs: three players 4 Asts: Deolinda, Catia 2

Stade 26 mars, Bamako

27 September 2011
20:00

Boxscore

Tunisia	55–48	DR Congo
Scoring by quarter: 7-21, 13-12, 12-6, 23-9
Pts: Gannar 14; Rebs: Gannar 6 Asts: Khalifa 2		Pts: Bopoli 11; Rebs: Nyota 8 Asts: Tebapale 2

Stade 26 mars, Bamako

28 September 2011
14:00

Boxscore

Mozambique	106–37	Ghana
Scoring by quarter: 23-13, 25-10, 35-11, 23-3
Pts: Leia; Rebs: Leia; Asts: Anabela, Catia 5		Pts: Sosavi 9 Rebs: Atebkah 7 Asts: three players 1

Pavillon des sports, Bamako

28 September 2011
16:00

Boxscore

Tunisia	53–74	Ivory Coast
Scoring by quarter: 15-16, 15-12, 11-29, 12-17
Pts: Gannar 12; Rebs: Khalifa 7 Asts: Msadek 2		Pts: N'Garsanet 22; Rebs: K.Kouyate 9 Asts: five players 2

Stade 26 mars, Bamako

28 September 2011
18:00

Boxscore

DR Congo	57–70	Mali
Scoring by quarter: 14-25, 12-11, 10-16, 21-18
Pts: Makiese; Rebs: three players 4 Asts: Tebapale 5		Pts: Sissoko; Rebs: Coulibaly; Asts: Traore, Gandega 4

Stade 26 mars, Bamako

=== Group B ===
Qualified for the quarter-finals

Team	Pld	W	L	PF	PA	PD	Pts
Senegal	5	5	0	397	256	+141	10
Angola	5	4	1	305	276	+29	9
Nigeria	5	3	2	309	293	+16	8
Cameroon	5	2	3	285	282	+3	7
Rwanda	5	1	4	280	277	+3	6
Guinea	5	0	5	175	367	−192	5

23 September 2011
11:00

Boxscore

Rwanda	69–35	Guinea
Scoring by quarter: 28–11, 15–9, 17–10, 9–5
Pts: Henderson 22; Rebs: Kabarere 9 Asts: Ayebare 4		Pts: Sidimé 10; Rebs: Sidimé 5 Asts: A.Sylla 2

Stade 26 mars, Bamako

23 September 2011
20:00

Boxscore

Senegal	86–62	Nigeria
Scoring by quarter: 22–16, 19–19, 18–10, 27–17
Pts: A.Traoré 17; Rebs: three players 6 Asts: Diouf 4		Pts: Gold-Onwude 16; Rebs: Wylie 5 Asts: Ekworomadu 2

Pavillon des sports, Bamako

24 September 2011
16:00

Boxscore

Nigeria	60–31	Guinea
Scoring by quarter: 21–6, 16–12, 8–7, 15–6
Pts: Sadiq 15; Rebs: Wylie 11; Asts: Adibeli, Gold-Onwude 3		Pts: Mbaye 16; Rebs: Sidimé 8 Asts: A.Sylla 3

Stade 26 mars, Bamako

24 September 2011
16:00

Boxscore

Cameroon	45–42	Rwanda
Scoring by quarter: 19-16, 9-12, 5-7, 12-7
Pts: Njonkou 11; Rebs: Njonkou, Datouo 11; Asts: Mbiandja, Njonkou 2		Pts: Henderson 18; Rebs: Williams 7 Asts: Ayebare, Mahoro 2

Pavillon des sports, Bamako

24 September 2011
20:00

Boxscore

Angola	42–63	Senegal
Scoring by quarter: 8–17, 18–15, 7–17, 9–14
Pts: three players 7 Rebs: Luísa 6 Asts: Nacissela 2		Pts: A.Traoré 13; Rebs: Marie Sy 9 Asts: Diouf 6

Stade 26 mars, Bamako

25 September 2011
14:00

Boxscore

Nigeria	68–60	Cameroon
Scoring by quarter: 17-17, 20-10, 13-11, 18-22
Pts: Sadiq 25; Rebs: Sadiq 11; Asts: Gold-Onwude 3		Pts: Njonkou 19; Rebs: Njonkou 10; Asts: Mbiandja 2

Stade 26 mars, Bamako

25 September 2011
16:00

Boxscore

Senegal	99–32	Guinea
Scoring by quarter: 29-6, 19-6, 30-14, 21-6
Pts: A.Traoré 24; Rebs: N.Ndiaye 10; Asts: Diouf 5		Pts: Mbaye 9 Rebs: Diallo 7 Asts: Mbaye 2

Pavillon des sports, Bamako

25 September 2011
16:00

Boxscore

Angola	67–59	Rwanda
Scoring by quarter: 8-21, 15-11, 25-15, 19-12
Pts: Nacissela; Rebs: Sónia; Asts: Catarina		Pts: Williams 18; Rebs: Henderson, Musabe 7 Asts: Williams 3

Stade 26 mars, Bamako

26 September 2011
14:00

Boxscore

Cameroon	45–66	Angola
Scoring by quarter: 15-25, 5-13, 9-17, 16-11
Pts: Mbiandja 13; Rebs: Njonkou, Njike 6 Asts: Njonkou 2		Pts: Sónia 15; Rebs: Nacissela 9 Asts: Nacissela 4

Pavillon des sports, Bamako

27 September 2011
14:00

Boxscore

Guinea	28–76	Cameroon
Scoring by quarter: 6-22, 2-18, 11-25, 9-11
Pts: Sidimé 8 Rebs: F.Sylla 4 Asts: three players 1		Pts: Njike 14; Rebs: Datouo 7 Asts: Ngo Banbe 3

Stade 26 mars, Bamako

27 September 2011
16:00

Boxscore

Senegal	71–61	Rwanda
Pts: Diouf, Sène 10; Rebs: Diop 10; Asts: Sène 5		Pts: Henderson 19; Rebs: Musabe 14; Asts: Henderson 3

Pavillon des sports, Bamako

27 September 2011
16:00

Boxscore

Angola	67–60	Nigeria
Scoring by quarter: 15-16, 19-15, 17-10, 16-19
Pts: Felizarda 17; Rebs: Nacissela 7 Asts: Fineza 3		Pts: Ogunjimi 13; Rebs: Mohammed 7 Asts: Gold-Onwude, Ibekwe 3

Stade 26 mars, Bamako

28 September 2011
14:00

Boxscore

Guinea	49–63	Angola
Pts: Mbaye 15; Rebs: Keita 7 Asts: A.Sylla 6		Pts: Felizarda 14; Rebs: Ngiendula 11; Asts: Astrida, Ngiendula 3

Stade 26 mars, Bamako

28 September 2011
16:00

Boxscore

Rwanda	49–59	Nigeria
Scoring by quarter: 17-10, 11-19, 7-9, 14-21
Pts: Mahoro 18; Rebs: Mahoro 5 Asts: three players 2		Pts: three players 4 Rebs: Ibekwe 9 Asts: Ekworomadu 4

Stade 26 mars, Bamako

28 September 2011
20:00

Boxscore

Cameroon	59–78	Senegal
Scoring by quarter: 16-15, 6-29, 16-19, 21-15
Pts: Njonkou 13; Rebs: Guotué 7 Asts: four players 4		Pts: Sène 19; Rebs: N.Ndiaye 8 Asts: Dieng 7

Stade 26 mars, Bamako

== Knockout stage ==
=== Championship bracket ===
Quarter-finals
30 September
Mali	73
Cameroon	50
30 September
Angola	72
Ivory Coast	51
30 September
Mozambique	49
Nigeria	77
30 September
Senegal	85
DR Congo	54

Semi-finals
1 October
Mali	51
Angola	56
1 October
Nigeria	63
Senegal	89

Final
2 October
Angola	62
Senegal	54
Third place
2 October
Mali	71
Nigeria	62

==== Quarterfinals ====
30 September 2011
14:00

Boxscore

Nigeria	77–49	Mozambique
Pts: Ogoke 17; Rebs: Ogoke 7 Asts: Gold-Onwude, Ogoke 3		Pts: Gimo 17; Rebs: Ngulela 5 Asts: Gimo, Valerdina 3

Stade 26 mars, Bamako

30 September 2011
16:00

Boxscore

DR Congo	54–85	Senegal
Scoring by quarter: 15-30, 16-21, 14-19, 9-15
Pts: Nyota; Rebs: Nyota 11; Asts: Nyota, Kalombo 2		Pts: A.Traoré 23; Rebs: Marie Sy 8 Asts: Dieng 5

Stade 26 mars, Bamako

30 September 2011
18:00

Boxscore

Cameroon	50–73	Mali
Scoring by quarter: 16-21, 6-15, 11-12, 17-25
Pts: Mbiandja 20; Rebs: Njonkou 6 Asts: Nimpa 2		Pts: Diawara 18; Rebs: Diawara 11; Asts: three players 4

Stade 26 mars, Bamako

30 September 2011
20:00

Boxscore

Ivory Coast	51–72	Angola
Scoring by quarter: 8-12, 7-15, 21-14, 15-31
Pts: Kolga, N'Garsanet 8 Rebs: N'Garsanet 5 Asts: Kolga, N'Garsanet 2		Pts: Nacissela; Rebs: Nadir 11; Asts: Sónia 3

Stade 26 mars, Bamako

==== Semifinals ====
1 October 2011
18:00

Boxscore

Mali	51–56	Angola
Scoring by quarter: 16-15, 8-9, 16-14, 11-18
Pts: Diawara 10; Rebs: Diawara, Sissoko 6 Asts: Diawara, Gandega 3		Pts: Sónia 14; Rebs: Manuel 9 Asts: Catarina 3

Stade 26 mars, Bamako

1 October 2011
20:00

Boxscore

Senegal	89–63	Nigeria
Scoring by quarter: 26-18, 21-9, 20-14, 22-22
Pts: As.Traoré 27; Rebs: N.Ndiaye, Diop 6 Asts: Aya Traore, Diouf 4		Pts: Ogoke 15; Rebs: Wylie, Ibekwe 7 Asts: Wylie 3

Stade 26 mars, Bamako

==== Bronze medal game ====
2 October 2011
15:30

Boxscore

Mali	71–62	Nigeria
Scoring by quarter: 19-18, 26-14, 9-16, 17-14
Pts: Sissoko 20; Rebs: Diawara 14; Asts: four players 3		Pts: Ogunjimi 23; Rebs: Sadiq 6 Asts: Ekworomadu 4

Pavillon des sports, Bamako

==== Final ====
2 October 2011
18:00

Boxscore

Angola	62–54	Senegal
Scoring by quarter: 16-14, 16-12, 13-19, 17-9
Pts: Sónia 23; Rebs: Sónia 6 Asts: Nacissela 3		Pts: Marie Sy 14; Rebs: Marie Sy 7 Asts: three players 2

Pavillon des sports, Bamako

=== 5–8th place bracket ===
Semifinals
1 October
Cameroon	62
Ivory Coast	60
1 October
DR Congo	60
Mozambique	84

Fifth place
2 October
Cameroon	67
Mozambique	68
Seventh place
2 October
Ivory Coast	52
DR Congo	59

==== Semifinals ====
1 October 2011
14:00

Boxscore

Cameroon	62–60	Ivory Coast
Scoring by quarter: 14-12, 18-14, 8-12, 22-22
Pts: Mbiandja 15; Rebs: Mbiandja 9 Asts: Mbiandja 5		Pts: K.Kouyate 25; Rebs: N'Garsanet 10; Asts: K.Kouyate 2

Stade 26 mars, Bamako

1 October 2011
16:00

Boxscore

DR Congo	60–84	Mozambique
Scoring by quarter: 14-14, 18-20, 16-27, 12-23
Pts: Makiese 14; Rebs: Mubalo 7 Asts: Tebapale 4		Pts: Leia 18; Rebs: Leia 10; Asts: Ngulela 9

Stade 26 mars, Bamako

==== Seventh place game ====
2 October 2011
11:00

Boxscore

Ivory Coast	52–59	DR Congo
Scoring by quarter: 12-15, 10-17, 16-12, 14-15
Pts: K.Kouyate 18; Rebs: K.Kouyate 7 Asts: K.Kouyate, N'Garsanet 3		Pts: Bopoli 17; Rebs: Nyota 16; Asts: Teba 2

Pavillon des sports, Bamako

==== Fifth place game ====
2 October 2011
13:00

Boxscore

Cameroon	67–68	Mozambique
Pts: Mbiandja; Rebs: Njonkou; Asts: Mbiandja, Njonkou 4		Pts: Anabela 24; Rebs: Leia 15; Asts: Ngulela 6

Pavillon des sports, Bamako

=== 9–12th place bracket ===
Semifinals
30 September
Tunisia	76
Guinea	47
30 September
Rwanda	53
Ghana	34

Ninth place
1 October
Tunisia	54
Rwanda	57
Eleventh place
1 October
Guinea	58
Ghana	40

==== Semifinals ====
30 September 2011
14:00

Boxscore

Guinea	47–76	Tunisia
Scoring by quarter: 9-14, 18-20, 11-29, 9-13
Pts: Mbaye 15; Rebs: Sidibe 8 Asts: three players 1		Pts: Inoubli 17; Rebs: M'Nasria 9 Asts: Khalifa 3

Pavillon des sports, Bamako

30 September 2011
16:00

Boxscore

Ghana	34–53	Rwanda
Scoring by quarter: 7-7, 6-20, 9-11, 12-15
Pts: Mumuni 9 Rebs: Sadat 11; Asts: Yinamyah 2		Pts: Henderson 20; Rebs: Mahoro 13; Asts: Henderson 4

Stade 26 mars, Bamako

==== Eleventh place game ====
1 October 2011
14:00

Boxscore

Guinea	58–40	Ghana
Scoring by quarter: 13-13, 20-9, 13-13, 12-5
Pts: Mbaye 16; Rebs: Keita 10; Asts: Mbaye 4		Pts: Sadat 15; Rebs: Sadat 18; Asts: Dsane 2

Pavillon des sports, Bamako

==== Ninth place game ====
1 October 2011
16:00

Boxscore

Tunisia	54–57	Rwanda
Scoring by quarter: 7-16, 11-18, 19-14, 17-9
Pts: M'Nasria 21; Rebs: M'Nasria 10; Asts: Khalifa 3		Pts: Mahoro 16; Rebs: Mahoro 11; Asts: Henderson 3

Pavillon des sports, Bamako

== Final standings ==
Qualified for the 2012 Summer Olympics
Qualified for the 2012 Olympic Qualifying Tournament

Rank	Team	Record
1st place, gold medalist(s)	Angola	7–1
2nd place, silver medalist(s)	Senegal	7–1
3rd place, bronze medalist(s)	Mali	7–1
4	Nigeria	4–4
5	Mozambique	6–2
6	Cameroon	3–5
7	DR Congo	3–5
8	Ivory Coast	2–6
9	Rwanda	3–4
10	Tunisia	3–4
11	Guinea	1–6
12	Ghana	0–7

Angola roster
Ângela Cardoso, Astrida Vicente, Catarina Camufal, Cristina Matiquite, Felizarda Jorge, Fineza Eusébio, Luísa Tomás, Luzia Simão, Nacissela Maurício, Nadir Manuel, Ngiendula Filipe, Sónia Guadalupe, Coach: Aníbal Moreira

Senegal and Nigeria renounced the right to compete in the World Olympic Qualifying Tournament for Women.
In these circumstances, FIBA has chosen Mozambique, the best team in the African Championship after Senegal and Nigeria.

== Awards ==
2011 FIBA Africa Championship for Women winners

Angola
First title

Most Valuable Player
(Angola) Nacissela Mauricio

=== All-Tournament Team ===
- (Senegal) Aya Traore
- (Angola) Nacissela Maurício
- (Senegal) Mame Diodio Diouf
- (Mali) Djenebou Sissoko
- (Angola) Sónia Guadalupe

== Statistical leaders ==
=== Individual Tournament Highs ===
Points

Rank	Name	G	Pts	PPG
1	(Rwanda) Tierra Henderson	7	124	17.7
2	(Mali) Sissoko	8	131	16.4
3	(Senegal) Astou Traoré	7	111	15.9
4	(Mozambique) Leia Dongue	8	120	15
5	(Ivory Coast) K.Kouyate	8	113	14.1
6	(Senegal) Aya Traore	8	107	13.4
7	(Nigeria) Sadiq	8	100	12.5
7	(Democratic Republic of the Congo) Makiese	8	100	12.5
9	(Tunisia) M'Nasria	6	72	12
10	(Madagascar) Mahoro	7	83	11.9

Rebounds

Rank	Name	G	Rbs	RPG
1	(Mozambique) Leia Dongue	8	82	10.2
2	(Mali) Djene Diawara	8	65	8.1
3	(Democratic Republic of the Congo) Mireille Nyota	8	59	7.4
3	(Cameroon) Amina Njonkou	8	59	7.4
5	(Ghana) Balikisu Sadat	6	44	7.3
6	(Madagascar) Georgina Ntow	6	43	7.2
7	(Rwanda) Tierra Henderson	7	49	7
8	(Mali) Djenebou Sissoko	8	55	6.9
9	(Rwanda) Jackie Musabe	6	40	6.7
10	(Rwanda) Laetitia Mahoro	7	46	6.6

Assists

Rank	Name	G	Ast	APG
1	(Senegal) Diodio Diouf	8	35	4.4
1	(Mozambique) Deolinda Ngulela	8	35	4.4
3	(Mali) Nassira Traore	8	22	2.8
4	(Senegal) Fatou Dieng	6	17	2.8
5	(Senegal) Aya Traore	8	21	2.6
6	(Mali) Hamchetou Maiga Ba	8	18	2.3
7	(Rwanda) Tierra Henderson	7	16	2.3
8	(Mali) Djene Diawara	8	17	2.1
8	(Ivory Coast) Stéphanie N'Garsanet	8	17	2.1
10	(Cameroon) Priscilla Mbiandja	7	15	2.1

Steals

Rank	Name	G	Stl	SPG
1	(Angola) Catarina Camufal	7	15	2.1
1	(Guinea) Aminata Sylla	7	15	2.1
3	(Ivory Coast) Kani Kouyate	8	16	2
4	(Ivory Coast) Salimata Berte	8	15	1.9
4	(Mozambique) Anabela Cossa	8	15	1.9
6	(Cameroon) Priscilla Mbiandja	7	12	1.7
7	(Mozambique) Leia Dongue	8	13	1.6
8	(Rwanda) Tierra Henderson	7	11	1.6
8	(Rwanda) Angellica Williams	7	11	1.6
10	(Democratic Republic of the Congo) Jeanine Kalombo	8	12	1.5

Blocks

Rank	Name	G	Blk	BPG
1	(Senegal) Marie Sy	8	7	0.9
2	(Senegal) Ndeye Ndiaye	8	5	0.6
3	(Rwanda) Tierra Henderson	7	4	0.6
4	(Mali) Djene Diawara	8	4	0.5
4	(Ivory Coast) Minata Fofana	8	4	0.5
4	(Angola) Nadir Manuel	8	4	0.5
7	(Tunisia) Selma M'Nasria	6	3	0.5
8	(Angola) Ngiendula Filipe	8	3	0.4
8	(Democratic Republic of the Congo) Kikwiki Munono	8	3	0.4
8	(Senegal) Adji Ndiaye	8	3	0.4

Minutes

Rank	Name	G	Min	MPG
1	(Rwanda) Tierra Henderson	7	248	35.4
2	(Rwanda) Laetitia Mahoro	7	243	34.7
3	(Ghana) Balikisu Sadat	6	208	34.7
4	(Ghana) Georgina Ntow	6	206	34.3
5	(Rwanda) Angellica Williams	7	224	32
6	(Guinea) Khady Mbaye	7	223	31.9
7	(Democratic Republic of the Congo) Jeanine Kalombo	8	248	31
8	(Ivory Coast) Kani Kouyate	8	243	30.4
9	(Cameroon) Amina Njonkou	8	240	30
10	(Guinea) Mariama Touré	7	208	29.7

=== Individual Game Highs ===
Department	Name	Total	Opponent
Points	(Senegal) Astou Traoré	27	Nigeria
Rebounds	(Mozambique) Leia Dongue	19	Ghana
Assists	(Mozambique) Deolinda Ngulela	9	DR Congo
Steals	(Angola) Catarina Camufal (Mozambique) Anabela Cossa (Guinea) Aminata Sylla	6	Rwanda; Ghana; Nigeria
Blocks	(Rwanda) Tierra Henderson (Senegal) Marie Sy	7	Senegal; DR Congo
2-point field goal percentage	(Mali) Djene Diawara	100% (6/6)	Cameroon
3-point field goal percentage	(Senegal) Diodio Diouf (Mozambique) Leia Dongue	100% (3/3)	Guinea; Tunisia
Free throw percentage	(Tunisia) Hela Msadek	100% (10/10)	DR Congo
Turnovers	(Ghana) Elizabeth Atebkah	9	Ivory Coast

=== Team Tournament Highs ===
Points per Game

Pos.	Name	PPG
1	Senegal	78.1
2	Mozambique	70.5
3	Mali	69.9
4	Nigeria	63.9
5	Ivory Coast	62.6
6	Angola	61.9
7	DR Congo	60.1
8	Cameroon	58
9	Tunisia	56
10	Rwanda	55.7

Total Points

Pos.	Name	PPG
1	Senegal	625
2	Mozambique	564
3	Mali	559
4	Nigeria	511
5	Ivory Coast	501
6	Angola	495
7	DR Congo	481
8	Cameroon	464
9	Rwanda	390
10	Tunisia	336

Rebounds

Pos.	Name	RPG
1	Mali	38.8
2	Rwanda	37.3
3	DR Congo	36.2
4	Mozambique	34
5	Tunisia	33.7
6	Cameroon	33.4
7	Nigeria	33
8	Ghana	32.8
9	Senegal	32.1
10	Ivory Coast	31.2

Assists

Pos.	Name	APG
1	Senegal	18
2	Mali	14.9
3	Mozambique	11.9
4	Ivory Coast	10.8
5	Nigeria	9.8
6	Cameroon	8.8
7	DR Congo	7.6
8	Rwanda	7.6
9	Angola	7.5
10	Tunisia	7.5

Steals

Pos.	Name	SPG
1	Mozambique	10.1
2	Tunisia	7.7
3	Angola	7.6
4	Ivory Coast	7.5
5	Mali	7.4
6	Guinea	7.3
7	Rwanda	7.3
8	Cameroon	7.1
9	Senegal	6.8
10	DR Congo	6.1

Blocks

Pos.	Name	BPG
1	Senegal	3
2	Angola	1.6
3	Mali	1.4
4	DR Congo	1.1
5	Rwanda	1
6	Cameroon	0.9
7	Nigeria	0.9
8	Ivory Coast	0.8
9	Guinea	0.7
10	Tunisia	0.7

2-point field goal percentage

Pos.	Name	%
1	Senegal	53.7
2	Mali	51.7
3	Angola	47.5
4	Mozambique	47.2
5	Cameroon	41.7
6	Nigeria	40.4
7	DR Congo	40.3
8	Tunisia	39.1
9	Ivory Coast	36.3
10	Rwanda	36

3-point field goal percentage

Pos.	Name	%
1	Senegal	38.4
2	Nigeria	34
3	Ivory Coast	28.3
4	Mozambique	28.2
5	Angola	24
6	Guinea	23.9
7	Rwanda	22.7
8	Cameroon	22.3
9	Mali	20.7
10	DR Congo	20.5

Free throw percentage

Pos.	Name	%
1	Senegal	67.8
2	Nigeria	65.2
3	Angola	64.9
4	Ivory Coast	63.4
5	Mozambique	61.8
6	Mali	61.1
7	DR Congo	59.7
8	Tunisia	59
9	Rwanda	58
10	Cameroon	52.8

=== Team Game highs ===
Department	Name	Total	Opponent
Points	Mozambique	106	Ghana
Rebounds	Mali; Mozambique	50	Tunisia; Ghana
Assists	Senegal	23	Guinea
Steals	Ivory Coast; Mozambique	17	Ghana
Blocks	Senegal	7	DR Congo
2-point field goal percentage	Senegal	68.4% (26/38)	Nigeria
3-point field goal percentage	Senegal	58.8% (10/17)	Guinea
Free throw percentage	Mozambique	94.4% (17/18)	DR Congo
Turnovers	Ghana	36	Ivory Coast

== See also ==
- 2011 FIBA Africa Women's Clubs Champions Cup
