= Basketball at the 2011 All-Africa Games – Women's team rosters =

This article displays the rosters for the participating teams at the 2011 All-Africa Games (women's basketball tournament).

== Algeria ==
Algeria women's national basketball team – 2011 All-Africa Games – 8th place roster
Players
Coaches

Pos.	No.	Name	Age – Date of birth	Height	Club	Ctr.
	4	Ikbal Chenaf	28 – 14 March 1983
	5	Nesrine Taïbi	23 – 28 June 1988
	6	Sarah Lemgherbi	–
	7	Samiya Boudjerima	23 – 26 April 1988
	8	Rachida Belaidi	31 – 28 November 1979
	9	Shahnez Boushaki	25 – 22 October 1985
	10	Sofia Saidani	19 – 5 January 1992
	11	Messaouda Haddad	25 – 24 November 1985
	12	Soulef Necib	22 – 25 January 1989
	13	Yasmina Bouhouche	–
	14	Radia Fantazi	19 – 10 August 1992
	15	Yasmina Chabi	33 – 21 December 1977

Head coach

- (Cuba) José Garcia Rodriguez

Assistant coach

- (Algeria) Houria Slimane

Legend

- (C) Team captain
- Club field describes current club

== Angola ==
Angola women's national basketball team – 2011 All-Africa Games – Silver Medal roster
Players
Coaches

Pos.	No.	Name	Age – Date of birth	Height	Club	Ctr.
PG	4	Catarina Camufal	31 – 30 March 1980	1.68 m (5 ft 6 in)	Interclube	(Angola)
F	5	Luzia Simão	18 – 14 February 1993	1.83 m (6 ft 0 in)	Interclube	(Angola)
PG	6	Felizarda Jorge	26 – 23 February 1985	1.73 m (5 ft 8 in)	1º de Agosto	(Angola)
SF	7	Ângela Cardoso	31 – 30 March 1980	1.80 m (5 ft 11 in)	1º de Agosto	(Angola)
G	8	Fineza Eusébio	21 – 18 July 1990	1.78 m (5 ft 10 in)	1º de Agosto	(Angola)
F	9	Cristina Matiquite	19 – 12 March 1992	1.78 m (5 ft 10 in)	1º de Agosto	(Angola)
PF	10	Sónia Guadalupe	25 – 15 September 1985	1.88 m (6 ft 2 in)	Interclube	(Angola)
C	11	Luísa Tomás	28 – 24 March 1983	1.93 m (6 ft 4 in)	Interclube	(Angola)
SG	12	Astrida Vicente	32 – 6 October 1978	1.73 m (5 ft 8 in)	Interclube	(Angola)
SF	13	Nacissela Maurício (C)	31 – 2 June 1980	1.91 m (6 ft 3 in)	1º de Agosto	(Angola)
PF	14	Nadir Manuel	24 – 30 November 1986	1.85 m (6 ft 1 in)	Interclube	(Angola)
SF	15	Ngiendula Filipe	29 – 20 May 1982	1.78 m (5 ft 10 in)	Interclube	(Angola)

Head coach

- (Angola) Aníbal Moreira

Assistant coach

Legend

- (C) Team captain
- Club field describes current club

== Cameroon ==
Cameroon women's national basketball team – 2011 All-Africa Games – 9th place roster
Players
Coaches

Pos.	No.	Name	Age – Date of birth	Height	Club	Ctr.
G	4	Marguerite Ngo Banbe	23 – 25 May 1988	1.62 m (5 ft 4 in)	INJS	(Cameroon)
G	5	Priscilla Mbiandja	22 – 20 February 1989	1.73 m (5 ft 8 in)	Ragin' Cajuns	(United States)
SF	6	Astride Njiogap	23 – 23 August 1988	1.74 m (5 ft 9 in)	INJS	(Cameroon)
C	7	Catherine Yenou	24 – 21 July 1987	1.85 m (6 ft 1 in)	INJS
F	8	Solange Ebondji	24 – 6 April 1987	1.80 m (5 ft 11 in)	Abidjan B.C.	(Ivory Coast)
F	9	Olivia Ouako	24 – 16 February 1987	1.82 m (6 ft 0 in)	Oilio Douala	(Cameroon)
C	10	Anne Njike	25 – 24 July 1986	1.85 m (6 ft 1 in)	Asvel	(France)
C	11	Hermine Guotué	19 – 11 July 1992	1.93 m (6 ft 4 in)	Jeanne d'Arc	(Senegal)
F	12	Sandrine Ayangma	20 – 25 October 1990	1.74 m (5 ft 9 in)	INJS
F	13	Amina Njonkou	23 – 6 April 1988	1.85 m (6 ft 1 in)	Strasbourg IG	(France)
C	14	Marie Nkoumou	21 – 15 August 1990	1.86 m (6 ft 1 in)	INJS
F	15	Josiane Nakoua	28 – 19 August 1983	1.75 m (5 ft 9 in)	INJS

Head coach

- (Cameroon) Alain Zedong

Assistant coach

- (Cameroon) Munyutu Pepouna

Legend

- (C) Team captain
- Club field describes current club

== DR Congo ==
DR Congo women's national basketball team – 2011 All-Africa Games – 10th place roster
Players
Coaches

Pos.	No.	Name	Age – Date of birth	Height	Club	Ctr.
F	4	Mireille Butayi	23 – 26 May 1988	1.80 m (5 ft 11 in)	Arc-en-Ciel	(Democratic Republic of the Congo)
G	5	Gina Tebapale	29 – 16 October 1981	1.56 m (5 ft 1 in)	Arc-en-Ciel	(Democratic Republic of the Congo)
F	6	Jeanine Kalombo	27 – 16 February 1984	1.72 m (5 ft 8 in)	Arc-en-Ciel	(Democratic Republic of the Congo)
G	7	Cele Mianda	20 – 21 October 1990	1.70 m (5 ft 7 in)	INSS	(Democratic Republic of the Congo)
F	8	Monique Kanku	28 – 25 December 1982	1.56 m (5 ft 1 in)	Arc-en-Ciel	(Democratic Republic of the Congo)
C	9	Nene Baketukila	28 – 25 December 1982	1.87 m (6 ft 2 in)	Arc-en-Ciel	(Democratic Republic of the Congo)
C	10	Mireille Nyota	21 – 2 February 1990	1.85 m (6 ft 1 in)	Arc-en-Ciel	(Democratic Republic of the Congo)
F	11	Elysée Ilunga	21 – 30 August 1990	1.66 m (5 ft 5 in)	INSS	(Democratic Republic of the Congo)
C	12	Sandra Kalombo	18 – 1 July 1993	1.82 m (6 ft 0 in)	Arc-en-Ciel	(Democratic Republic of the Congo)
C	13	Nicole Mubalo	18 – 5 November 1992	1.86 m (6 ft 1 in)	INSS	(Democratic Republic of the Congo)
F	14	Ginette Makiese	23 – 20 April 1988	1.90 m (6 ft 3 in)	Arc-en-Ciel	(Democratic Republic of the Congo)
C	15	Hortis Ahongi	23 – 10 October 1987	1.87 m (6 ft 2 in)	INSS	(Democratic Republic of the Congo)

Head coach

- Joachim Vale

Assistant coach

Legend

- (C) Team captain
- Club field describes current club

== Ivory Coast ==
Ivory Coast women's national basketball team – 2011 All-Africa Games – 5th place roster
Players
Coaches

Pos.	No.	Name	Age – Date of birth	Height	Club	Ctr.
	4	Amandine Binde	24 – 22 January 1987
G	6	Assétou Kolga	23 – 24 April 1988	1.70 m (5 ft 7 in)
	7	Salimata Berte	22 – 7 May 1989
	8	Amandine Bognini	27 – 10 July 1984
	9	Edjime Djedjemel	22 – 29 October 1988
	10	Kani Kouyate	21 – 8 August 1990
	13	Angelina Halobo	18 – 23 October 1992
	14	Mariama Kouyate	23 – 16 June 1988
	15	Minata Fofana	25 – 22 March 1986

Head coach

- (France) Simon Guillou

Assistant coach

Legend

- (C) Team captain
- Club field describes current club

== Kenya ==
Kenya women's national basketball team – 2011 All-Africa Games – 6th place roster
Players
Coaches

Pos.	No.	Name	Age – Date of birth	Height	Club	Ctr.
	4	Silalei Shani	24 – 14 December 1986		Eagle Wings	(Kenya)
	5	Emma Nyakweba	25 – 16 April 1986		Coop Bank	(Kenya)
	6	Deborah Obunga	21 – 25 February 1990		Gladiators	(Kenya)
	7	Betty Mjomba	26 – 30 August 1985		Eagle Wings	(Kenya)
	8	Hilda Luvandwa	26 – 18 May 1985		USIU Flames	(Kenya)
	9	Brenda Jumba	24 – 19 September 1986		K.P.A.	(Kenya)
	10	Linda Alando	26 – 12 October 1984		Coop Bank	(Kenya)
	11	Salma Akinyi	18 – 31 December 1992		Coop Bank	(Kenya)
	12	Rose Ouma	26 – 6 November 1984		Eagle Wings	(Kenya)
	13	Sarah Owich	25 – 5 August 1986		Coop Bank	(Kenya)
	14	Caroline Achieng	35 – 7 September 1976		Eagle Wings	(Kenya)
	15	Angela Okoth	26 – 8 August 1985		Eagle Wings	(Kenya)

Head coach

- (Rwanda) Cliff Owuor

Assistant coach

- (Kenya) Phillip Onyango

Legend

- (C) Team captain
- Club field describes current club

== Mali ==
Mali women's national basketball team – 2011 All-Africa Games – 12th place roster
Players
Coaches

Pos.	No.	Name	Age – Date of birth	Height	Club	Ctr.
G	4	Aminata Sissoko	20 – 5 May 1991	1.70 m (5 ft 7 in)	Djoliba AC	(Mali)
G	5	Djénébou Damba	26 – 11 July 1985	1.67 m (5 ft 6 in)	USFAS Bamako	(Mali)
G	6	Zenebou Kante	–	1.65 m (5 ft 5 in)	AS Real Bamako	(Mali)
F	7	Kama Dembélé	22 – 8 October 1988	1.76 m (5 ft 9 in)	Djoliba AC	(Mali)
G	8	Assa Togola	–	1.65 m (5 ft 5 in)	CBD	(Mali)
G	9	Aminata Berthe	–		USM de Koutiala	(Mali)
F/C	10	Aminata Mariko	21 – 23 June 1990	1.83 m (6 ft 0 in)	COD Meknès	(Morocco)
F/C	11	Teniba Sanogo	–	1.82 m (6 ft 0 in)	Djoliba AC	(Mali)
F	12	Djenaba Samake	26 – 22 August 1985	1.79 m (5 ft 10 in)	Stade Malien	(Mali)
C	13	Mariam Konate	–	1.85 m (6 ft 1 in)	AS Real Bamako	(Mali)
F/C	14	Djenebou Sacko	21 – 12 June 1990	1.83 m (6 ft 0 in)	Djoliba AC	(Mali)
C	15	Aminata Keita	19 – 30 March 1992	1.91 m (6 ft 3 in)	Djoliba AC	(Mali)

Head coach

- (Mali) Mohamed Maiga

Assistant coach

- (Mali) Cheick Fofana

Legend

- (C) Team captain
- Club field describes current club

== Mozambique ==
Mozambique women's national basketball team – 2011 All-Africa Games – 4th place roster
Players
Coaches

Pos.	No.	Name	Age – Date of birth	Height	Club	Ctr.
	4	Valerdina Manhonga	30 – 26 December 1980	1.68 m (5 ft 6 in)
	5	Deolinda Ngulela	30 – 18 April 1981	1.70 m (5 ft 7 in)
	6	Ana Azinheira	34 – 8 February 1977	1.84 m (6 ft 0 in)
	7	Anabela Cossa	25 – 7 April 1986	1.72 m (5 ft 8 in)
	8	Zinobia Machanguana	34 – 8 February 1977
	9	Cátia Halar	28 – 28 November 1982	1.72 m (5 ft 8 in)
	10	Carla Silva	33 – 12 March 1978
	11	Leia Dongue	20 – 24 May 1991	1.85 m (6 ft 1 in)
	12	Ruth Muianga	28 – 6 April 1983	1.75 m (5 ft 9 in)
	13	Ondina Nhampossa	32 – 18 June 1979	1.84 m (6 ft 0 in)
	14	Odélia Mafanela	22 – 14 April 1989	1.80 m (5 ft 11 in)
	15	Deolinda Gimo	24 – 15 August 1987	1.90 m (6 ft 3 in)

Head coach

- (Spain) Luis Hernandez

Assistant coach

- (Mozambique) Carlos Niquice
- (Mozambique) Simão Mataveia

Legend

- (C) Team captain
- Club field describes current club

== Nigeria ==
Nigeria women's national basketball team – 2011 All-Africa Games – Bronze Medal roster
Players
Coaches

Pos.	No.	Name	Age – Date of birth	Height	Club	Ctr.
	4	Helen Ogunjimi	26 – 26 October 1984
	5	Ugo Oha	29 – 18 July 1982
	6	Rosalyn Gold-Onwude	24 – 28 April 1987
	7	Sarah Ogoke	21 – 25 June 1990
	8	Nkechi Akashili	21 – 22 February 1990
F	9	Aisha Mohammed	25 – 21 October 1985	1.93 m (6 ft 4 in)
	10	Chinyere Ibekwe	23 – 2 December 1987
	11	Joyce Ekworomadu	25 – 6 August 1986
	12	Adeola Wylie	29 – 12 January 1982
F	13	Rashidat Sadiq	30 – 3 January 1981	1.88 m (6 ft 2 in)
	14	Grace Okonkwo	24 – 20 October 1986
	15	Olayinka Sanni	25 – 21 August 1986

Head coach

- (Nigeria) Ayo Bakare

Assistant coach

- (Nigeria) Mfon Udoka

Legend

- (C) Team captain
- Club field describes current club

== Rwanda ==
Rwanda women's national basketball team – 2011 All-Africa Games – 7th place roster
Players
Coaches

Pos.	No.	Name	Age – Date of birth	Height	Club	Ctr.
	4	Scholastique Mukandayisenga	22 – 19 December 1988		N.U.R.	(Rwanda)
	5	Angellica Williams	23 – 30 September 1987		APR	(Rwanda)
	6	Yvette Uwizeye	18 – 24 December 1992		APR	(Rwanda)
	7	Laetitia Mahoro	21 – 29 September 1989		APR	(Rwanda)
	8	Jovithe Kabarere	25 – 12 July 1986		APR	(Rwanda)
	9	Tierra Henderson	24 – 6 May 1987		APR	(Rwanda)
	10	Honorée Ayebare	23 – 10 November 1987		APR	(Rwanda)
	11	Joselyne Munyaneza	27 – 4 April 1984		APR	(Rwanda)
	12	Liliane Kayitesi	26 – 5 March 1985		N.U.R.	(Rwanda)
	13	Marie Kayitesi	28 – 15 August 1983		N.U.R.	(Rwanda)
	14	Claudette Imanishimwe	29 – 26 May 1982		APR	(Rwanda)
	15	Jackie Musabe	24 – 15 August 1987		APR	(Rwanda)

Head coach

- (Croatia) Nenad Amanović

Assistant coach

- (Rwanda) Jean Claude Rutabayire

Legend

- (C) Team captain
- Club field describes current club

== Senegal ==
Senegal women's national basketball team – 2011 All-Africa Games – Gold Medal roster
Players
Coaches

Pos.	No.	Name	Age – Date of birth	Height	Club	Ctr.
G	4	Ndeye Fall	22 – 19 September 1988	1.70 m (5 ft 7 in)	DUC	(Senegal)
SG	5	Aya Traoré	28 – 27 July 1983	1.88 m (6 ft 2 in)	Celta de Vigo	(Spain)
F	6	Oumoul Sarr	27 – 25 January 1984	1.90 m (6 ft 3 in)		(Spain)
PF	7	Awa Doumbia	32 – 8 August 1979	1.82 m (6 ft 0 in)		(Spain)
G	8	Mame Diodio Diouf	26 – 15 December 1984	1.74 m (5 ft 9 in)		(Switzerland)
G	9	Ndèye Sène	23 – 18 January 1988	1.69 m (5 ft 7 in)	St Louis	(Senegal)
PF	10	Astou Traoré	30 – 30 April 1981	1.86 m (6 ft 1 in)		(Spain)
C	11	Adji Ndiaye	24 – 4 November 1986	1.94 m (6 ft 4 in)		(United States)
PF	12	Mame-Marie Sy	26 – 25 March 1985	1.85 m (6 ft 1 in)		(France)
C	13	Ndèye Ndiaye	32 – 2 May 1979	1.89 m (6 ft 2 in)		(France)
C	14	Aminata Nar Diop	28 – 3 January 1983	1.98 m (6 ft 6 in)		(Spain)
C	15	Aïda Fall	24 – 10 November 1986	1.86 m (6 ft 1 in)		(France)

Head coach

- (Senegal) Moustapha Gaye

Assistant coach

Legend

- (C) Team captain
- Club field describes current club

== Zimbabwe ==
Zimbabwe women's national basketball team – 2011 All-Africa Games – 11th place roster
Players
Coaches

Pos.	No.	Name	Age – Date of birth	Height	Club	Ctr.
G	4	Fadzai Mabasa	28 – 7 May 1983	1.74 m (5 ft 9 in)	J.B.C.	(Zimbabwe)
G	5	Margaret Magwaro	27 – 30 October 1983	1.63 m (5 ft 4 in)	Varsity Leopards	(Zimbabwe)
G	6	Sharon Chamwarura	17 – 29 September 1993	1.72 m (5 ft 8 in)	J.B.C.	(Zimbabwe)
F	7	Charity Chigumba	25 – 8 June 1986	1.78 m (5 ft 10 in)	Varsity Leopards	(Zimbabwe)
G	8	Chushi Makoni	21 – 29 January 1990	1.70 m (5 ft 7 in)	Varsity Leopards	(Zimbabwe)
G	9	Nobukhosi Ndlovu	21 – 16 February 1990	1.76 m (5 ft 9 in)	Eastern Lakers	(Zimbabwe)
G	10	Geraldine Chibonda	25 – 16 December 1985	1.71 m (5 ft 7 in)	Giants	(Zimbabwe)
F	11	Dorcas Marondera	21 – 10 September 1990	1.78 m (5 ft 10 in)	J.B.C.	(Zimbabwe)
F	12	Ethel Shaba	18 – 1 December 1992	1.80 m (5 ft 11 in)	J.B.C.	(Zimbabwe)
F	13	Isobel Tengende	26 – 8 May 1985	1.79 m (5 ft 10 in)	J.B.C.	(Zimbabwe)
C	14	Sibongile Mkandla	24 – 13 December 1986	1.85 m (6 ft 1 in)	Eastern Lakers	(Zimbabwe)
F	15	Alexandra Maseko	22 – 5 September 1989	1.83 m (6 ft 0 in)	Varsity Leopards	(Zimbabwe)

Head coach

- (Zimbabwe) Ronald Garura

Assistant coach

Legend

- (C) Team captain
- Club field describes current club

== See also ==
- 2011 FIBA Africa Championship for Women squads
