= 2009 FIBA Africa Championship for Women =

2009 FIBA Women's AfroBasket
19th FIBA Women's African Basketball Championship

Tournament details
- Host country: Madagascar
- Dates: October 9 - October 18
- Teams: 12 (from 1 federation)
- Venue: 1 (in 1 host city)

Final positions
- Champions: Senegal (10th title)

Tournament statistics
- MVP: (Senegal) Aya Traoré
- Top scorer: (Ivory Coast) K.Kouyaté 15.6
- Top rebounds: (Mali) Diawara 9
- Top assists: (Rwanda) Williams 3.9
- PPG (Team): Senegal 81.1
- RPG (Team): Mali 43.2
- APG (Team): Senegal 16.1

Official website
- Official Website

The 2009 FIBA Africa Championship for Women is the 19th continental championships held by FIBA Africa. The championship will serve as a qualifying tournament for the 2010 FIBA World Championship for Women in the Czech Republic. The tournament took place at the Palais des Sports, Antananarivo, Madagascar from October 9 to October 18. Senegal defeated Mali in the final to capture its tenth FIBA Africa Championship for Women. Both teams qualified for the 2010 FIBA World Championship for Women.

== Draw ==
Group A	Group B
Cameroon; Madagascar; Mauritius; Mozambique; Senegal; South Africa	Angola; Ivory Coast; Mali; Nigeria; Rwanda; Tunisia

== Preliminary round ==
=== Group A ===
Qualified for the quarter-finals

Team	Pts.	W	L	PCT	PF	PA	Diff
Senegal	10	5	0	1.000	413	168	+245
Mozambique	9	4	1	.800	338	258	+80
Cameroon	8	3	2	.600	326	248	+78
Madagascar	7	2	3	.400	324	343	-19
South Africa	6	1	4	.200	274	323	-49
Mauritius	5	0	5	.000	157	492	-335

October 9
18:00

Boxscore

Mauritius	42–86	Madagascar
Scoring by quarter: 7-21, 9-12, 8-24, 18-29
Pts: Somauroo 10; Rebs: Benjamin 8 Asts: Spéville 2		Pts: Nahirae 13; Rebs: Lydia 8 Asts: Maiwenn 4

Palais des Sports, Antananarivo

October 9
14:30

Boxscore

Mozambique	55–48	Cameroon
Scoring by quarter: 12-16, 14-17, 20-10, 9-5
Pts: Azinheira 17; Rebs: Odélia 11; Asts: Valerdina 4		Pts: Bedihoune 15; Rebs: Bedihoune 11; Asts: Njonkou 6

Palais des Sports, Antananarivo

October 9
14:30

Boxscore

Senegal	75–34	South Africa
Scoring by quarter: 15-8, 20-9, 15-13, 25-4
Pts: Traoré 17; Rebs: B.Diouf 2 Asts: D.Diouf 5		Pts: Modiselle 7 Rebs: Khoabane 10; Asts: Moutlwatse 3

Palais des Sports, Antananarivo

October 10
18:00

Boxscore

Madagascar	39–67	Cameroon
Scoring by quarter: 8-17, 13-19, 13-18, 5-13
Pts: Tahinjanahary, Maiwenn 10; Rebs: Maiwenn 5 Asts: Maiwenn 3		Pts: Njonkou 20; Rebs: Jamen, Bedihoune 10; Asts: Ngo Banbe 2

Palais des Sports, Antananarivo

October 10
14:00

Boxscore

Mauritius	29–70	South Africa
Scoring by quarter: 6-20, 10-14, 4-17, 9-19
Pts: Labelle 10; Rebs: Spéville 8 Asts: Karina 3		Pts: Modiselle 18; Rebs: Njokweni, Sathula 10; Asts: Sathula 7

Palais des Sports, Antananarivo

October 10
20:00

Boxscore

Mozambique	37–73	Senegal
Scoring by quarter: 10-15, 4-17, 14-18, 9-23
Pts: Azinheira, Marta 7 Rebs: Leia 6 Asts: four players 1		Pts: Traoré 15; Rebs: Diop 9 Asts: Dieng 6

Palais des Sports, Antananarivo

October 11
18:00

Boxscore

South Africa	73–101	Madagascar
Scoring by quarter: 25-22, 15-18, 13-35, 20-26
Pts: Ledwaba 13; Rebs: Njokweni 10; Asts: Modiselle 3		Pts: Tahinjanahary 32; Rebs: Lydia 9 Asts: Tahinjanahary 8

Palais des Sports, Antananarivo

October 11
16:00

Boxscore

Cameroon	39–68	Senegal
Scoring by quarter: 11-13, 3-22, 13-16, 12-17
Pts: Bedihoune 13; Rebs: Njonkou 8 Asts: three players 1		Pts: Traoré, D.Diouf 15; Rebs: Diop 9 Asts: Dieng 4

Palais des Sports, Antananarivo

October 11
16:00

Boxscore

Mauritius	31–121	Mozambique
Scoring by quarter: 7-17, 6-47, 10-27, 8-30
Pts: Nemorin 9 Rebs: Nemorin, Labelle 8 Asts: four players 1		Pts: Filomena 25; Rebs: Leia 11; Asts: Amélia 6

Palais des Sports, Antananarivo

October 13
18:00

Boxscore

Madagascar	39–90	Senegal
Scoring by quarter: 7-15, 9-26, 12-28, 11-21
Pts: Nahirae 23; Rebs: Lydia 7 Asts: Zafiliay 3		Pts: Sène 18; Rebs: Marie Sy 7 Asts: Dieng 5

Palais des Sports, Antananarivo

October 13
14:00

Boxscore

South Africa	47–54	Mozambique
Scoring by quarter: 16-11, 6-15, 13-19, 12-9
Pts: Ledwaba 18; Rebs: Ledwaba 8 Asts: Molema 4		Pts: Leia 19; Rebs: Leia 7 Asts: four players 1

Palais des Sports, Antananarivo

October 13
14:00

Boxscore

Cameroon	108–36	Mauritius
Scoring by quarter: 18-5, 15-11, 26-12, 49-8
Pts: Ebondji 23; Rebs: Nguimfack 14; Asts: Mbick 3		Pts: Spéville 14; Rebs: Somauroo 9 Asts: three players 2

Palais des Sports, Antananarivo

October 14
18:00

Boxscore

Madagascar	59–71	Mozambique
Scoring by quarter: 19-7, 15-26, 13-30, 12-8
Pts: Prisca 16; Rebs: Nahirae 8 Asts: Tahinjanahary 5		Pts: Leia 16; Rebs: Aleia 12; Asts: Valerdina 5

Palais des Sports, Antananarivo

October 14
14:00

Boxscore

Mauritius	19–107	Senegal
Scoring by quarter: 2-26, 8-28, 3-27, 6-26
Pts: Karina 7 Rebs: Somauroo 5 Asts: Somauroo, Davy 1		Pts: Sène 20; Rebs: Sarr 10; Asts: Sène, Thiam 8

Palais des Sports, Antananarivo

October 14
16:00

Boxscore

South Africa	50–64	Cameroon
Scoring by quarter: 19-21, 6-15, 12-12, 13-16
Pts: Ledwaba 12; Rebs: Ledwaba 7 Asts: Mtsweni 2		Pts: Ebondji 15; Rebs: Ngamou 5 Asts: Ngo Banbe, Jamen 2

Palais des Sports, Antananarivo

=== Group B ===
Qualified for the quarter-finals

Team	Pts.	W	L	PCT	PF	PA	Diff
Mali	9	4	1	.800	294	236	+58
Ivory Coast	9	4	1	.800	287	268	+19
Angola	9	4	1	.800	304	273	+31
Nigeria	7	2	3	.400	267	243	+24
Tunisia	6	1	4	.200	252	308	-56
Rwanda	5	0	5	.000	264	340	-76

October 9
20:00

Boxscore

Nigeria	37–41	Mali
Scoring by quarter: 13-11, 10-14, 6-9, 8-7
Pts: Sadiq 13; Rebs: Sadiq 10; Asts: Ojelabi, Udoka 1		Pts: Maïga Ba 11; Rebs: Sissoko 9 Asts: Maïga Ba 2

Palais des Sports, Antananarivo

October 9
14:30

Boxscore

Tunisia	50–62	Ivory Coast
Scoring by quarter: 14-16, 15-9, 10-14, 11-23
Pts: Zagrouba 12; Rebs: Adsi, Gannar 7 Asts: Zagrouba 3		Pts: K.Kouyaté 18; Rebs: Abbady 9 Asts: K.Kouyaté 2

Palais des Sports, Antananarivo

October 9
12:30

Boxscore

Angola	66–54	Rwanda
Scoring by quarter: 17-16, 16-10, 11-10, 22-18
Pts: Luísa 14; Rebs: Luísa 8 Asts: Irene, Ernestina 3		Pts: Karangwa 15; Rebs: Karangwa, Williams 8 Asts: Williams 4

Palais des Sports, Antananarivo

October 10
16:00

Boxscore

Mali	52–62	Ivory Coast
Scoring by quarter: 9-15, 21-7, 13-12, 9-28
Pts: Touré 13; Rebs: Coulibaly 8 Asts: Sininta 4		Pts: K.Kouyaté 20; Rebs: D.N'Garsanet 12; Asts: Fofana 2

Palais des Sports, Antananarivo

October 10
16:00

Boxscore

Nigeria	79–49	Rwanda
Scoring by quarter: 24-12, 18-16, 19-8, 18-13
Pts: Szczechowiak 22; Rebs: Szczechowiak 20; Asts: Adibeli 6		Pts: Williams 18; Rebs: Mahoro 7 Asts: Williams 3

Palais des Sports, Antananarivo

October 10
14:00

Boxscore

Tunisia	56–62	Angola
Scoring by quarter: 16-8, 5-24, 14-12, 21-18
Pts: Chelly 15; Rebs: Chelly, Adsi 7 Asts: Zagrouba 6		Pts: Felizarda 14; Rebs: Ngiendula 10; Asts: Catarina 3

Palais des Sports, Antananarivo

October 11
14:00

Boxscore

Rwanda	48–72	Mali
Scoring by quarter: 13-16, 12-23, 9-18, 14-15
Pts: Williams 19; Rebs: Mahoro 8 Asts: Ayebare 2		Pts: Coulibaly 17; Rebs: Diawara 11; Asts: Mariam Sy 4

Palais des Sports, Antananarivo

October 11
20:00

Boxscore

Ivory Coast	55–65	Angola
Scoring by quarter: 13-22, 13-13, 13-10, 16-20
Pts: M.Kouyaté 16; Rebs: M.Kouyaté, K.Kouyaté 6 Asts: M.Kouyaté, K.Kouyaté 3		Pts: Nacissela 22; Rebs: Nacissela, Luísa 7 Asts: Domitila 4

Palais des Sports, Antananarivo

October 11
14:00

Boxscore

Nigeria	65–49	Tunisia
Scoring by quarter: 26-23, 20-8, 10-7, 9-11
Pts: n/a		Pts: n/a

Palais des Sports, Antananarivo

October 13
20:00

Boxscore

Mali	63–51	Angola
Scoring by quarter: 9-20, 14-9, 17-5, 23-17
Pts: Coulibaly 16; Rebs: Coulibaly, Sissoko 7 Asts: Gandega, Tirera 3		Pts: Nacissela 20; Rebs: Luísa 8 Asts: Catarina 3

Palais des Sports, Antananarivo

October 13
16:00

Boxscore

Rwanda	53–59	Tunisia
Scoring by quarter: 9-20, 23-13, 17-7, 4-19
Pts: Grandberry 16; Rebs: Grandberry 11; Asts: Grandberry, Ayebare 3		Pts: M'Nasria, Gannar 16; Rebs: M'Nasria 12; Asts: M'Nasria, Chelly 3

Palais des Sports, Antananarivo

October 13
16:00

Boxscore

Ivory Coast	44–41	Nigeria
Scoring by quarter: 15-8, 2-4, 6-6, 21-23
Pts: Berte 14; Rebs: D.N'Garsanet 9 Asts: Abbady 1		Pts: Udoka 12; Rebs: Wylie 6 Asts: Adibeli 3

Palais des Sports, Antananarivo

October 14
20:00

Boxscore

Mali	66–38	Tunisia
Scoring by quarter: 20-14, 15-9, 14-7, 17-8
Pts: Sissoko 17; Rebs: Diawara 16; Asts: Touré 3		Pts: three players 6 Rebs: Dhouibi 6 Asts: Hamrouni 3

Palais des Sports, Antananarivo

October 14
16:00

Boxscore

Angola	60–45	Nigeria
Scoring by quarter: 14-8, 16-10, 7-21, 23-6
Pts: Luísa 14; Rebs: Nacissela 8 Asts: Domitila 5		Pts: Sadiq 11; Rebs: Sadiq 6 Asts: Ojelabi 2

Palais des Sports, Antananarivo

October 14
14:00

Boxscore

Rwanda	60–64	Ivory Coast
Scoring by quarter: 10-18, 11-12, 16-18, 23-16
Pts: Brown 21; Rebs: Brown 13; Asts: Williams 6		Pts: K.Kouyaté, Berte 17; Rebs: D.N'Garsanet 9 Asts: K.Kouyaté 5

Palais des Sports, Antananarivo

== Knockout stage ==
=== Championship bracket ===
Quarter-finals
October 16
Senegal	89
Nigeria	45
October 16
Cameroon	44
Ivory Coast	55
October 16
Mozambique	36
Angola	68
October 16
Mali	80
Madagascar	46

Semi-finals
October 17
Senegal	75
Ivory Coast	54
October 17
Angola	60
Mali (OT)	70

Final
October 18
Senegal	72
Mali	57
Third place
October 18
Ivory Coast	57
Angola	76

==== Quarterfinals ====
October 16
20:00

Boxscore

Nigeria	45–89	Senegal
Scoring by quarter: 11-25, 10-24, 14-19, 10-21
Pts: Ojelabi 15; Rebs: Wylie 7 Asts: five players 1		Pts: Dieng 16; Rebs: Diop 10; Asts: Dieng 4

Palais des Sports, Antananarivo

October 16
12:30

Boxscore

Cameroon	44–55	Ivory Coast
Scoring by quarter: 9-13, 9-16, 10-14, 16-12
Pts: Djandjo 13; Rebs: Djandjo 13; Asts: four players 1		Pts: K.Kouyaté 15; Rebs: D.N'Garsanet 9 Asts: K.Kouyaté 2

Palais des Sports, Antananarivo

October 16
15:00

Boxscore

Angola	68–36	Mozambique
Scoring by quarter: 16-5, 16-11, 22-14, 14-6
Pts: Nacissela 17; Rebs: Luísa 10; Asts: Astrida, Ernestina 2		Pts: Catia 8 Rebs: Leia 8 Asts: three players 2

Palais des Sports, Antananarivo

October 16
17:30

Boxscore

Madagascar	46–80	Mali
Scoring by quarter: 12-30, 15-14, 12-12, 7-24
Pts: Nahirae 11; Rebs: Belinda 5 Asts: Belinda 4		Pts: Traore 14; Rebs: Diawara 14; Asts: Maïga Ba 4

Palais des Sports, Antananarivo

==== Semifinals ====
October 17
17:30

Boxscore

Senegal	75–54	Ivory Coast
Scoring by quarter: 16-14, 12-12, 29-18, 18-10
Pts: Traoré 26; Rebs: Gueye, B.Diouf 8 Asts: B.Diouf 4		Pts: K.Kouyaté 22; Rebs: Fofana 9 Asts: three players 1

Palais des Sports, Antananarivo

October 17
20:00

Boxscore

Mali	70–60 (OT)	Angola
Scoring by quarter: 15-12, 14-12, 8-19, 20-14, Overtime: 13-3
Pts: Maïga Ba; Rebs: Diawara; Asts: Maïga Ba		Pts: Nacissela 19; Rebs: Nacissela 5 Asts: Domitila 3

Palais des Sports, Antananarivo

==== 3rd place match ====
October 18
15:00

Boxscore

Ivory Coast	57–76	Angola
Scoring by quarter: 12-17, 18-17, 12-16, 15-26
Pts: K.Kouyaté 15; Rebs: Fofana 11; Asts: M.Kouyaté 5		Pts: Catarina 13; Rebs: Nacissela, Luísa 8 Asts: Catarina 4

Palais des Sports, Antananarivo

==== Final ====
October 18
17:30

Boxscore

Senegal	72–57	Mali
Scoring by quarter: 28-9, 19-14, 8-14, 17-20
Pts: Traoré 19; Rebs: Diop 6 Asts: Traoré 3		Pts: Maïga Ba 17; Rebs: Diawara 12; Asts: Gandega 5

Palais des Sports, Antananarivo

=== 5th place bracket ===
Semi-finals
October 17
Nigeria	62
Cameroon	51
October 17
Mozambique	73
Madagascar	66

Fifth place
October 18
Nigeria	67
Mozambique	57
Seventh place
October 18
Cameroon	66
Madagascar	61

==== Classification 5-8 ====
October 17
12:30

Boxscore

Nigeria	62–51	Cameroon
Scoring by quarter: 10-15, 24-16, 20-14, 8-6
Pts: Ojelabi 18; Rebs: Wylie 16; Asts: Wylie 4		Pts: Ngamou, Njiogap 10; Rebs: Djandjo 9 Asts: Ngo Banbe 4

Palais des Sports, Antananarivo

October 17
15:00

Boxscore

Madagascar	66–73	Mozambique
Scoring by quarter: 19-25, 11-21, 13-15, 23-12
Pts: three players 14; Rebs: Lydia 9 Asts: Tahinjanahary 8		Pts: Catia 18; Rebs: Leia 10; Asts: Valerdina 8

Palais des Sports, Antananarivo

==== 7th place match ====
October 18
12:30

Boxscore

Cameroon	66–61	Madagascar
Scoring by quarter: 16-9, 15-21, 22-17, 13-14
Pts: Alina 22; Rebs: Alina 18; Asts: Ngamou 3		Pts: Tahinjanahary 29; Rebs: Belinda 6 Asts: Rokia 4

Palais des Sports, Antananarivo

==== 5th place match ====
October 18
10:00

Boxscore

Nigeria	67–57	Mozambique
Scoring by quarter: 13-5, 12-16, 19-21, 23-15
Pts: Ojelabi 21; Rebs: Wylie 12; Asts: Adibeli 5		Pts: Filomena 15; Rebs: Odélia 4 Asts: Anabela 4

Palais des Sports, Antananarivo

=== 9th place bracket ===
Semi-finals
October 16
South Africa	56
Rwanda	69
October 16
Tunisia	99
Mauritius	29

Ninth place
October 17
Rwanda	70
Tunisia	65
Eleventh place
October 17
South Africa	60
Mauritius	36

==== Classification 9-12 ====
October 16
14:00

Boxscore

Rwanda	69–56	South Africa
Scoring by quarter: 26-18, 11-12, 21-10, 11-16
Pts: Brown 22; Rebs: Williams 10; Asts: Ayebare 6		Pts: Mtsweni, Moutlwatse 13; Rebs: Sathula 8 Asts: Sathula 4

Palais des Sports, Antananarivo

October 16
16:00

Boxscore

Mauritius	29–99	Tunisia
Scoring by quarter: 12-21, 7-33, 1-22, 9-23
Pts: Nemorin 11; Rebs: Spéville 7 Asts: Rivière, Karina 1		Pts: Inoubli 17; Rebs: Inoubli, Adsi 6 Asts: Chelly 6

Palais des Sports, Antananarivo

==== 11th place match ====
October 17
14.00

Boxscore

South Africa	60–36	Mauritius
Scoring by quarter: 16-6, 17-6, 16-8, 11-16
Pts: Mtsweni 13; Rebs: Njokweni 11; Asts: Moutlwatse 7		Pts: Spéville 15; Rebs: Nemorin 10; Asts: Karina 2

Palais des Sports, Antananarivo

==== 9th place match ====
October 17
16:00

Boxscore

Rwanda	70–65	Tunisia
Scoring by quarter: 15-18, 22-13, 19-15, 14-19
Pts: Brown 25; Rebs: Brown 17; Asts: Williams 8		Pts: M'Nasria 23; Rebs: M'Nasria 11; Asts: Zagrouba 5

Palais des Sports, Antananarivo

== Final standings ==
Qualified for the 2010 FIBA Women's World Cup

Rank	Team	Record
1st place, gold medalist(s)	Senegal	8–0
2nd place, silver medalist(s)	Mali	6–2
3rd place, bronze medalist(s)	Angola	6–2
4	Ivory Coast	5–3
5	Nigeria	4–4
6	Mozambique	5–3
7	Cameroon	4–4
8	Madagascar	2–6
9	Rwanda	2–5
10	Tunisia	2–5
11	South Africa	2–5
12	Mauritius	0–7

Senegal roster
Awa Gueye, Aya Traoré, Aminata Dieye, Aminata Nar Diop, Bineta Diouf, Fatou Dieng, Fatou Thiam, Fatoumata Diango, Mame Diodio Diouf, Mame Marie Sy, Ndèye Sène, Oumoul Sarr, Coach:

== Awards ==
2009 FIBA Africa Championship for Women winners

Senegal
Tenth title

Most Valuable Player
(Senegal) Aya Traoré

=== All-Tournament Team ===
- (Senegal) Aya Traoré
- (Angola) Nacissela Maurício
- (Senegal) Fatou Dieng
- (Senegal) Aminata Nar Diop
- (Mali) Naignouma Coulibaly

== Statistical leaders ==
=== Individual Tournament Highs ===
Points

Rank	Name	G	Pts	PPG
1	(Ivory Coast) Kani Kouyaté	8	125	15.6
2	(Angola) Nacissela Maurício	8	121	15.1
3	(Senegal) Aya Traoré	8	118	14.8
4	(Madagascar) Ange Rasoambolanoro	8	117	14.6
5	(Nigeria) Funmilayo Ojelabi	7	88	12.6
6	(Rwanda) Angellica Williams	7	82	11.7
7	(Senegal) Fatou Dieng	8	88	11
8	(Mali) Hamchétou Maïga	8	85	10.6
9	(Tunisia) Selma M'Nasria	6	63	10.5
10	(Angola) Luísa Tomás	8	83	10.4

Rebounds

Rank	Name	G	Rbs	RPG
1	(Mali) Djene Diawara	8	72	9
2	(Nigeria) Adeola Wylie	7	62	8.9
3	(Ivory Coast) Stéphanie N'Garsanet	8	59	7.4
4	(Angola) Luísa Tomás	8	58	7.2
5	(South Africa) Emmerentia Ledwaba	6	54	7.3
6	(Senegal) Aminata Nar Diop	8	57	7.1
6	(Mozambique) Leia Dongue	8	57	7.1
6	(Cameroon) Viviane Djandjo	8	57	7.1
9	(Angola) Nacissela Maurício	8	56	7
9	(Mali) Djenebou Sissoko	8	56	7

Assists

Rank	Name	G	Ast	APG
1	(Rwanda) Angellica Williams	7	27	3.9
2	(Madagascar) Ange Rasoambolanoro	8	30	3.8
3	(Tunisia) Fatma Zagrouba	6	23	3.8
4	(Senegal) Fatou Dieng	8	28	3.5
5	(Mozambique) Valerdina Manhonga	8	26	3.3
6	(Rwanda) Honorée Ayebare	7	21	3
7	(Tunisia) Maha Chelly	6	16	2.7
8	(Angola) Domitila Ventura	8	19	2.4
8	(Madagascar) Maiwenn Andriamilandy	8	19	2.4
10	(Nigeria) Nwamaka Adibeli	7	17	2.4

Steals

Rank	Name	G	Stl	SPG
1	(Mozambique) Valerdina Manhonga	8	23	2.9
2	(Rwanda) Honorée Ayebare	7	16	2.3
3	(Mauritius) Vanessa Spéville	7	15	2.1
4	(Senegal) Fatou Dieng	8	16	2
4	(Madagascar) Ange Rasoambolanoro	8	16	2
6	(Senegal) Ndèye Sène	7	14	2
7	(Ivory Coast) Kani Kouyaté	8	15	1.9
8	(Senegal) Oumoul Sarr	5	9	1.8
9	(Mali) Hamchétou Maïga	8	13	1.6
9	(Ivory Coast) Dénaïmou N'Garsanet	8	13	1.6

Blocks

Rank	Name	G	Blk	BPG
1	(Mali) Naignouma Coulibaly	8	12	1.5
1	(Senegal) Marie Sy	8	12	1.5
3	(Mauritius) Marie Nemorin	7	9	1.3
4	(Angola) Luísa Tomás	8	8	1
4	(Mali) Djene Diawara	8	8	1
6	(Nigeria) Charity Szczechowiak	7	7	1
7	(Senegal) Aminata Dieye	6	6	1
8	(Madagascar) Lydia Rasoanirina	8	7	0.9
9	(Angola) Nacissela Maurício	8	6	0.8
9	(Senegal) Aminata Nar Diop	8	6	0.8

Minutes

Rank	Name	G	Min	MPG
1	(Mauritius) Karina Venketasawmy	7	261	37.3
2	(Ivory Coast) Kani Kouyaté	8	288	36
3	(Ivory Coast) Dénaïmou N'Garsanet	7	264	33
4	(Mauritius) Vanessa Spéville	7	229	32.7
5	(Nigeria) Funmilayo Ojelabi	7	225	32.1
6	(Rwanda) Laetitia Mahoro	6	223	31.9
7	(Tunisia) Fatma Zagrouba	8	189	31.5
8	(Angola) Nacissela Maurício	7	249	31.1
9	(Rwanda) Angellica Williams	7	218	31.1
10	(Rwanda) Honorée Ayebare	7	216	30.9

=== Individual Game Highs ===
Department	Name	Total	Opponent
Points	(Madagascar) Ange Rasoambolanoro	32	South Africa
Rebounds	(Nigeria) Charity Szczechowiak	20	Rwanda
Assists	(Mozambique) Valerdina Manhonga (Madagascar) Ange Rasoambolanoro (Madagascar) Ange Rasoambolanoro (Senegal) Ndèye Sène (Senegal) Fatou Thiam (Rwanda) Angellica Williams	8	Madagascar; South Africa; Mozambique; Mauritius; Mauritius; Tunisia
Steals	(Cameroon) Solange Ebondji (Mozambique) Valerdina Manhonga (Ivory Coast) Dénaïmou N'Garsanet	7	Mauritius; Mauritius; Rwanda
Blocks	(Angola) Luísa Tomás	6	Mozambique
2-point field goal percentage	(Senegal) Oumoul Sarr	100% (6/6)	Mauritius
3-point field goal percentage	(Mali) Kadia Touré	100% (3/3)	Ivory Coast
Free throw percentage	(Madagascar) Maiwenn Andriamilandy (Cameroon) Astride Njiogap (Rwanda) Takisha Grandberry (Tunisia) Selma M'Nasria (Madagascar) Ange Rasoambolanoro (Mali) Djenebou Sissoko (Senegal) Aya Traoré (Tunisia) Fatma Zagrouba	100% (6/6)	South Africa; Nigeria; Ivory Coast; Rwanda; Cameroon; Angola; Mali; Rwanda
Turnovers	(Mauritius) Karina Venketasawmy	13	Mozambique

=== Team Tournament Highs ===
Points per Game

Pos.	Name	PPG
1	Senegal	81.1
2	Angola	63.5
3	Mozambique	63
4	Mali	62.6
5	Madagascar	62.1
6	Tunisia	61.2
7	Cameroon	60.9
8	Rwanda	57.6
9	Ivory Coast	56.6
10	South Africa	55.7

Rebounds

Pos.	Name	RPG
1	Mali	43.2
2	Cameroon	41.1
3	Senegal	39.8
4	Rwanda	36.6
5	Angola	36.4
6	Nigeria	36.4
7	Ivory Coast	35
8	South Africa	34.9
9	Tunisia	34.8
10	Mozambique	34.6

Assists

Pos.	Name	APG
1	Senegal	16.1
2	Madagascar	12.6
3	Tunisia	12.2
4	Mozambique	11.9
5	Mali	11.8
6	Rwanda	11.4
7	Angola	11.3
8	South Africa	9.9
9	Cameroon	7.9
10	Nigeria	7.1

Steals

Pos.	Name	SPG
1	Senegal	12.4
2	Mozambique	12.1
3	Cameroon	10
4	Tunisia	9
5	Mali	8.8
6	Ivory Coast	7.8
7	Madagascar	7.8
8	Rwanda	7.6
9	South Africa	7
10	Angola	6.8

Blocks

Pos.	Name	BPG
1	Mali	4.5
2	Senegal	4
3	Angola	2.5
4	Nigeria	2.4
5	Rwanda	2.3
6	Mozambique	2
7	Mauritius	1.7
8	Madagascar	1.6
9	Cameroon	1.5
10	Tunisia	1.5

Fouls

Pos.	Name	FPG
1	Mali	21.1
2	Ivory Coast	20.8
3	Tunisia	20.2
4	Cameroon	19.8
5	Madagascar	19.8
6	Rwanda	19.4
7	Mozambique	19.1
8	Senegal	17.9
9	Nigeria	17
10	Angola	16.4

2-point field goal percentage

Pos.	Name	%
1	Senegal	54.2
2	Madagascar	46.4
3	Angola	43.6
4	Mali	41.5
5	Tunisia	39.9
6	Nigeria	39.7
7	Mozambique	39.2
8	South Africa	38.9
9	Cameroon	38.2
10	Ivory Coast	36.4

3-point field goal percentage

Pos.	Name	%
1	Angola	31.9
2	Senegal	29.9
3	Nigeria	28.6
4	Mozambique	25.4
5	Tunisia	25.2
6	Cameroon	23.8
7	Ivory Coast	23.8
8	South Africa	21.9
9	Madagascar	21.7
10	Rwanda	21.1

Free throw percentage

Pos.	Name	%
1	Senegal	70.5
2	Ivory Coast	68.8
3	Tunisia	66.4
4	South Africa	66.4
5	Angola	63.9
6	Rwanda	62.6
7	Mali	62.2
8	Cameroon	59.3
9	Mozambique	57.9
10	Nigeria	55.7

=== Team Game highs ===
Department	Name	Total	Opponent
Points	Mozambique	121	Mauritius
Rebounds	Cameroon	65	Mauritius
Assists	Senegal	30	Mauritius
Steals	Mozambique	35	Mauritius
Blocks	Angola	10	Mozambique
2-point field goal percentage	Senegal	76.6% (36/47)	Mauritius
3-point field goal percentage	Angola	50% (7/14)	Nigeria
Free throw percentage	Cameroon	85.7% (12/14)	Nigeria
Turnovers	Mauritius	49	Mozambique

== See also ==
- 2009 FIBA Africa Women's Clubs Champions Cup
