= Uju Ugoka =

Nigerian basketball player

Uju Ugoka Ogbodo
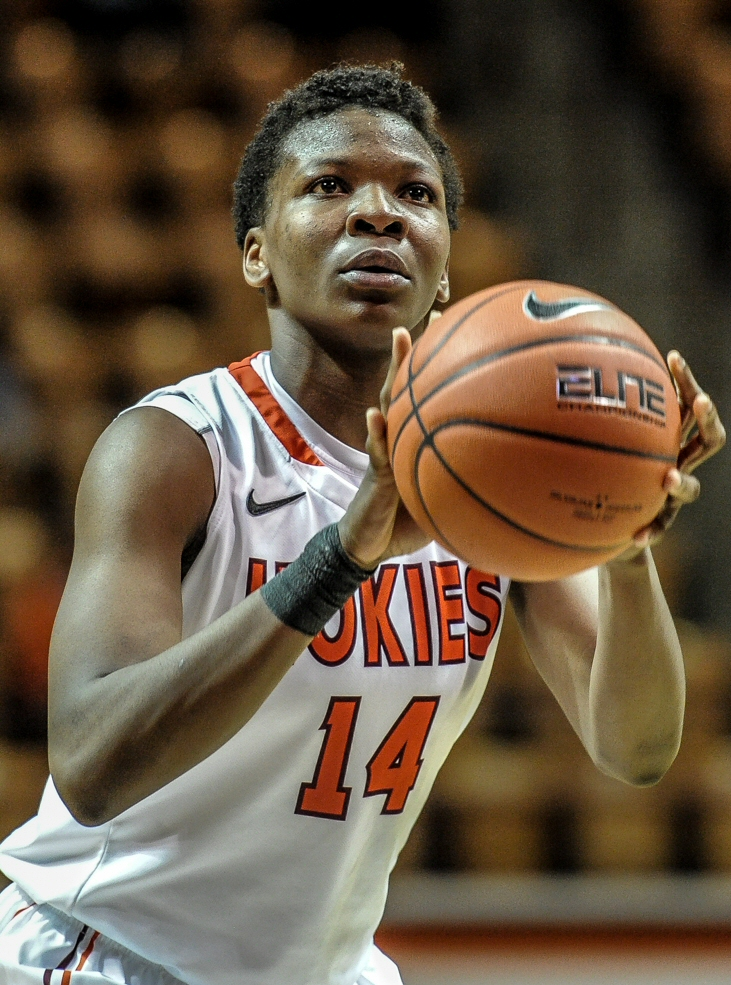
- Uju Ugoka taking a foul shot at Virginia Tech in 2013

No. 1 – La Roche Vendée Basket Club
- Position: Point guard
- League: Ligue Féminine de Basketball

Personal information
- Born: May 24, 1993 (age 33) Lagos, Nigeria
- Listed height: 6 ft 1 in (1.85 m)
- Listed weight: 146 lb (66 kg)

Career information
- College: Grayson College; Gulf Coast State; Virginia Tech
- NBA draft: 2014: undrafted
- Playing career: 2014–present

Career history
- 2014-2015: Pallacanestro Vigarano
- 2015: First Bank Basketball Club
- 2015-2016: Basket Parma
- 2016-2018: AZS-UMCS Lublin
- 2018-present: La Roche Vendée Basket Club

Uju Ugoka Ogbodo (born 24 May 1993) is a Nigerian basketball player for the La Roche Vendée Basket Club and the Nigerian national team. She played college basketball for the Virginia Tech Hokies women's basketball team.

== College career ==
Ugoka moved to the United States after being scouted at the Hope for girls basketball camp organised by Mobolaji Akiode. She played her freshman year at Grayson County College prior to when the basketball program of the university got disbanded in 2011, she was named into first-team NJCAA All-America honors. She moved to the Gulf Coast State College Commodores in her sophomore year, she averaged 16.69 points, 8.79 rebounds and 0.93 assists. She earned the conference player of the year honors and first-team NJCAA All-America honors She transferred to Virginia Tech Hokies women's basketball in 2012 for her Junior and Senior year, In her Junior year, she averaged 12.5 points and 8.5 rebounds. In her Senior year, she averaged 18.4 points, 9.6 rebounds and 1.2 assists per game.

== Professional career ==
Ugoka started her professional career with the Italian Serie A side Pallacanestro Vigarano in 2014–15 season, she averaged 18.2 points, 11.4 rebounds and 1.7 assists per game. She played for the Nigerian side First Bank basketball Club in 2015, she also moved to the Italian side Basket Parma in the 2015, where she averaged 16 points, 14.1 rebounds and 1.8 assists per game. She moved to the Polish side AZS-UMCS Lublin in 2016–17 season, she averaged 12.6 points, 9.9 rebounds and 1.4 assists per game. In the 2017–18 season at Poland, she averaged 15.6 points, 10.8 rebounds and 1 assist per game. She moved to the Ligue Féminine de Basketball side La Roche Vendée Basket Club in June 2018, In the 2018–19 season, she averaged 12.6 points, 6.6 rebounds and 0.9 assist per game.

== National team career ==
=== Junior team ===
Ugoka represented Nigeria at the 2008 FIBA Africa Under-18 Championship for Women where she averaged 3 points and 3 rebounds.

=== Senior team ===
Ugoka represented Nigeria in the qualifying round to the 2009 FIBA Africa Championship for Women, where she averaged 7 points, 3.2 rebounds and 0.5 assist per game. In the 2009 FIBA Africa Championship for Women, she averaged 7.4 points, 5.1 rebounds and 0.3 assist per game. Ugoka represented the Nigerian national team at the 2016 FIBA World Olympic Qualifying Tournament for Women in France, she averaged 5 points, 5 rebounds and 1 assist per game at the tournament.
