= Pavillon des Sports Modibo Keita =

Indoor sporting arena in Bamako, Mali

- Location: Bamako, Mali

Construction
- Opened: 1960; 66 years ago
- Renovated: 2011

Pavillon des sports Modibo Keita is an indoor sporting arena located in Bamako, Mali. Built in 1960, the venue is named after Modibo Keïta, the first President of Mali.

The stadium hosted the finals of the 2009 Mali Handball Cup on August 11, 2009. The event was attended by Amadou Toumani Touré, President of the Republic of Mali.

In 2008, it was reported that the arena suffered from years of decline due to lack of maintenance. The stadium was renovated in 2011 ahead of the 2011 Women's African Basketball Championship.
