= Claude Constantino =

Senegalese basketball player (1938–2019)

Personal information
- Nationality: Senegalese
- Born: 13 December 1938; Dakar, Senegal
- Died: 29 October 2019 (aged 80)

Sport
- Sport: Basketball

Claude Constantino (13 December 1938 – 29 October 2019) was a Senegalese basketball player. He was of Cape Verdean descent. He competed in the men's tournament at the 1968 Summer Olympics.
