= Ghana women's national basketball team =

Ghana
- FIBA ranking: NR (18 March 2026)
- Joined FIBA: 1962
- FIBA zone: FIBA Africa
- National federation: Amateur Basketball Association of Ghana

AfroBasket
- Appearances: 3
- Medals: 1979
Home	Away

The Ghana women's national basketball team represents Ghana in international basketball competitions. It is administered by the Amateur Basketball Association of Ghana (GBBA).

The team has consistently lacked government support and has often only been able to compete because of the help of individuals.

== AfroBasket record ==
- 1977 – 6th place
- 1979 – 3rd place
- 2011 – 12th place
