= Mauritius women's national basketball team =

Mauritius
- FIBA ranking: NR (8 August 2025)
- Joined FIBA: 1959
- FIBA zone: FIBA Africa
- National federation: Mauritius Basketball Federation

AfroBasket
- Appearances: 1

The Mauritius women's national basketball team represents the Mauritius in international competitions. It is administered by the Mauritius Basketball Federation.

== AfroBasket record ==
- 2009 – 12th place
