= Scott Nnaji =

Nigerian women's basketball coach

Scott Nnaji is a Nigerian women's basketball coach. He coached the Nigeria women's national basketball team in a number of international tournaments, including the 2004 Summer Olympics as an assistant coach and multiple AfroBasket Women tournaments as head coach.
