= Ana Flávia Azinheira =

Mozambican basketball player

Ferroviário Maputo
- Position: Power forward

Personal information
- Born: February 8, 1977 (age 49) Maputo, Mozambique
- Listed height: 1.84 m (6 ft 0 in)

Career information
- Playing career: 2001–2014

Career history
- 2006: Ferroviário Maputo

Ana Flávia João de Azinheira (born February 8, 1977) is a Mozambican female professional basketball player and politician. She is currently the vice-minister of Youth and Sport of Mozambique. With Mozambique she played in the 2014 World Championships and three editions of the African Championships (2009, 2011, 2013).
