= Aissata Maiga =

Malian basketball player (born 1992)

No. 5 – AS Police
- Position: Point guard
- League: SD1

Personal information
- Born: 21 March 1992 (age 34) Bamako, Mali
- Listed height: 1.68 m (5 ft 6 in)
- Listed weight: 63 kg (139 lb)

Career information
- College: Troy (2013–2017)
- WNBA draft: 2017: undrafted
Medals
Women's basketball
Representing Mali
African Games
Gold medal – first place	2015 Brazzaville	Team
Silver medal – second place	2019 Rabat	3x3
AfroBasket
Bronze medal – third place	2017 Mali
Bronze medal – third place	2019 Senegal

Aissata Maiga (born 21 March 1992) is a Malian basketball player for AS Police and the Malian national team.

With the Mali women's basketball team, she was a finalist in the 2009 African Championship, 15th in the 2010 World Championship, third in the 2011 African Championship, fifth in the 2013 African Championship and the 2015 African Championship. She won the 2015 All-African Games.

She participated at the 2017 Women's Afrobasket.
