= Ndèye Ndiaye =

Senegalese basketball player (born 1979)

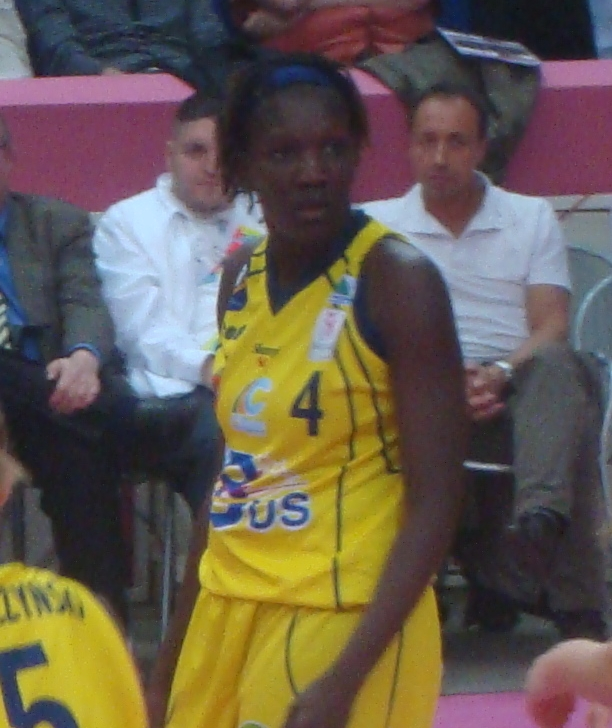

Personal information
- Born: 2 May 1979 (age 47) Dakar, Senegal
- Listed height: 191 cm (6 ft 3 in)

Ndèye Ndiaye (born 2 May 1979 in Dakar) is a Senegalese professional women's basketball player with Tarbes GB of the Ligue Féminine de Basketball. Ndiaye is an alumnus of Southern Nazarene University in Oklahoma, USA.

She is a regular on the Senegal women's national basketball team.
