= Diana Gandega =

French-Malian basketball player

Personal information
- Born: 2 June 1983 (age 43) Paris, France
Medals
Women's basketball
Representing Mali
African Games
Gold medal – first place	2015 Brazzaville	Team

Diana Leo Gandega (born 2 June 1983 in Paris) is a French-Malian women's basketball player. Gandega competed for Mali at the 2008 Summer Olympics, where she scored 15 points in 5 games, including 8 points in the first match, a 4-point loss to New Zealand. Her younger sister Touty Gandega is also a basketball player.
