= Djenebou Sissoko =

Malian basketball player (born 1982)

Djénébou Sissoko (born 27 June 1982 in San) is a Malian women's basketball player. Sissoko represented Mali, and competed as part of the women's national basketball team at the 2008 Summer Olympics in Beijing. During the tournament, she scored a total of twenty-four points and thirty-two rebounds, including thirteen against the Czech Republic, in five group play games.

Sissoko is also a member of Djoliba AC women's basketball team in Bamako.
