= Selma M'Nasria =

Tunisian basketball player

Personal information
- Born: October 11, 1986 (age 40) Sfax, Tunisia
- Listed height: 1.90 m (6 ft 3 in)
- Position: Center

Selma M'Nasria (born October 11, 1986) is a Tunisian female professional basketball player.
