= Oumoul Sarr =

Senegalese basketball player

No. 6 – Tindastóll
- Position: Power forward / center
- League: Úrvalsdeild kvenna

Personal information
- Born: 25 January 1984 (age 42) Dakar, Senegal
- Listed height: 1.90 m (6 ft 3 in)

Career history
- 2008–2009: Ferrol
- 2009–2011: San Sebastián
- 2011–2013: Spar Girona
- 2013–2014: San Sebastián
- 2014–2021: IDK Euskotren
- 2013–2021: Lobas Aguascalientes
- 2022: Tarbes
- 2023–2024: Bursa
- 2024: Freseras
- 2024–present: Tindastóll
Medals
Women's basketball
Representing Senegal
AfroBasket
| Silver medal – second place | 2017 Mali |
| Silver medal – second place | 2019 Senegal |
| Silver medal – second place | 2023 Rwanda |
African Games (All-Africa Games)
| Gold medal – first place | 2011 Maputo | Team |

Oumoul Khairy Sarr (born 25 January 1984) is a Senegalese basketball professional player and a member of the Senegalese national team. She has spent most of her professional career in Spain but has also played in France, Mexico, Poland, Turkey and Iceland. In 2021, she won the Mexican national championship.

She participated at the 2017 Women's Afrobasket.

After spending the previous season with Freseras in the Mexican LNBPF, Sarr signed with Tindastóll of the Icelandic Úrvalsdeild kvenna in July 2024.
