= Aminata Nar Diop =

Senegalese basketball player

Personal information
- Born: January 3, 1983 (age 43) Saint Louis, Senegal
- Listed height: 1.96 m (6 ft 5 in)

Career information
- College: Southeastern Illinois (2004–2006); Georgetown (2006–2008)
- WNBA draft: 2008: undrafted
- Playing career: 1999–2015
- Position: Center

Career history
- 1999–2003: Saint-Louis Basket Club
- 2009–2010: Pully
- 2010–2011: Coelbi Bembibre
- 2011–2012: Nantes Rezé
- 2012–2013: Flammes Carolo
- 2013–2015: Roche Vendée

Aminata Nar Diop (born January 3, 1983) is a Senegalese basketball player.
