= Luísa Tomás =

Angolan basketball player

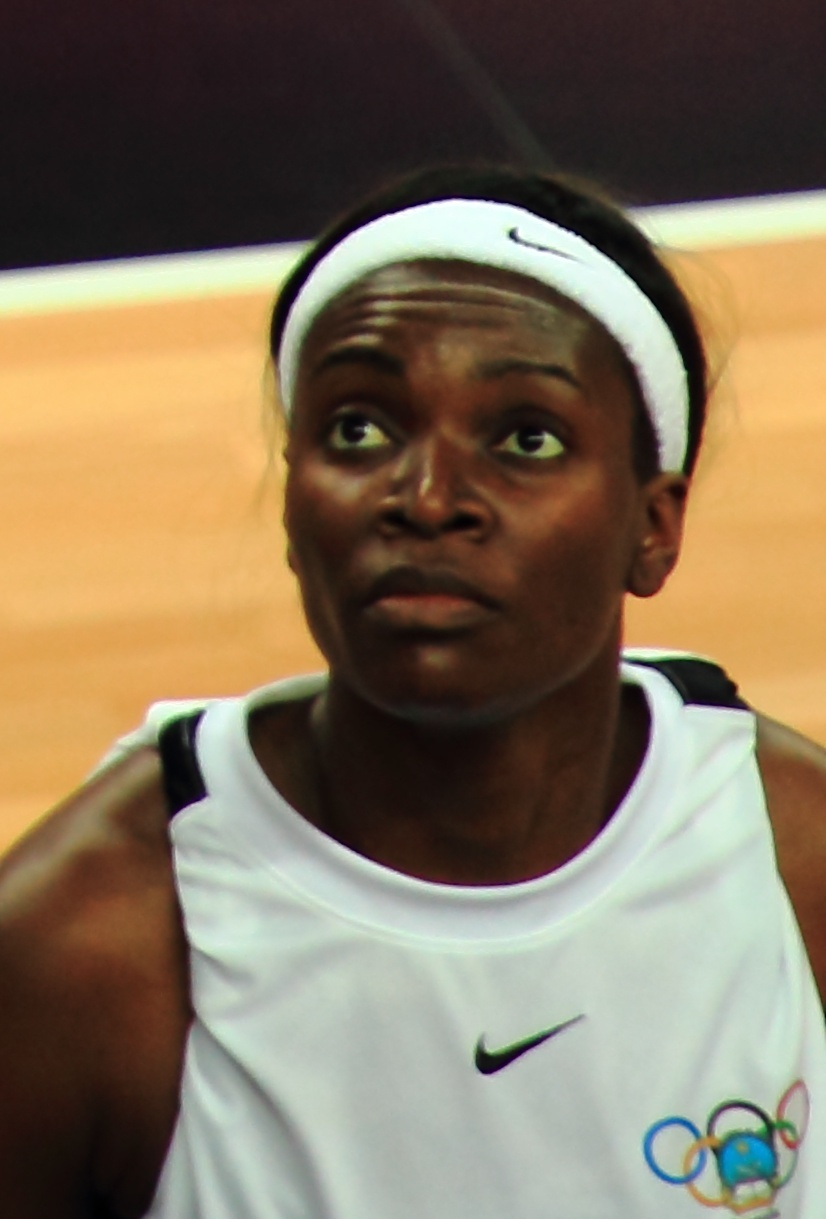

No. 11 – Primeiro de Agosto
- Position: Center
- League: Angolan League; Africa Club Champions Cup

Personal information
- Born: 24 March 1983 (age 43) Benguela, Angola
- Listed height: 192 cm (6.30 ft)
- Listed weight: 82 kg (181 lb)

Career history
- 2002–2010: Primeiro de Agosto
- 2011–2013: Interclube
- 2013–present: Primeiro de Agosto

Luísa Macuto Tomás (born 24 March 1983) is an Angolan basketball player. At the 2012 Summer Olympics, she competed for the Angola women's national basketball team in the women's event.
