= Rashidat Sadiq =

Nigerian basketball player

Personal information
- Born: 3 January 1981 (age 45) Ibadan, Nigeria

Career information
- College: Central Arizona College; UConn; Oklahoma State
Medals
Women's basketball
Representing Nigeria
African Games (All-Africa Games)
Bronze medal – third place	2011 Maputo	Team

Rashidat Odun Sadiq (born 3 January 1981 in Ibadan) is a Nigerian women's basketball player. She played in the United States with the University of Connecticut Huskies and Oklahoma State Cowgirls. She also played with the Nigeria women's national basketball team at the 2004 Summer Olympics and the 2006 Commonwealth Games.

Sadiq moved to the U.S. to play college basketball at Central Arizona College. As a freshman, she averaged 20.9 points and 10.1 rebounds per game, leading the Vaqueras to a 31–4 record and an appearance in the NJCAA tournament. As a sophomore, Sadiq averaged 24.9 points and 10.9 rebounds per game, helping the Vaqueras to a 33–3 record and a third-place finish at the NJCAA tournament. She finished as the program's all-time leading scorer with 1,629 points.
