= Cátia Halar =

Mozambican basketball player

Personal information
- Born: November 28, 1982 (age 43) Maputo, Mozambique
- Listed height: 1.73 m (5 ft 8 in)
- Position: Power forward / small forward

Career history
- 2008–2014: Desportivo de Maputo

Cátia Halar (born November 28, 1982) is a Mozambican female professional basketball player.
