= Valerdina Manhonga =

Mozambican basketball player

No. 4 – National team
- Position: Shooting guard
- League: Mundial, Afrobaskt, campeonato da Cidade de Maputo

Personal information
- Born: 26 December 1980 (age 45) Lichinga, Mozambique
- Listed height: 1.68 m (5 ft 6 in)
- Listed weight: 57 kg (126 lb)

Career information
- High school: Universidade Pedagógica
- College: Josina Machel
- Drafted by: Costa do Sol
- Playing career: 1993–2019

Career history
- 1999, 1997-2014/9, 2003, 2004-2010 e 2011/2: Conseng, Costa do Sol, Académica, Desportivo e Liga Muçulmana

Career highlights
- Vicecampea Africana Selecção Nacional, tricampea Africana de clubes (Desportivoe Liga Muçulmana, campea dos jogos da lusofonia goa 2014, melhor Base, Melhor Defensora
Medals
10 Ouro, 7 Prata, 3 Bronze

Valerdina Manhonga (born 26 December 1980) is a Mozambican female professional basketball player.
