= Amina Njonkou =

Cameroonian basketball player

Personal information
- Born: 6 April 1988 (age 38) Foumban, Cameroon
- Listed height: 1.85 m (6 ft 1 in)
- Position: Power forward

Career history
- Sdent Nyon
- 2010–2011: Strasbourg Alsace Basket Club
- 2011–2012: CB Conquero
- 2012–2013: ADBA Aviles
- 2013–2014: Las Gaunas
- 2014–2015: Campus Promete Logron
- 2016–: Basket Club Montbrison Féminines

Amina Njonkou (born 6 April 1988) is a Cameroonian female professional basketball player.
