= Aya Traoré =

Senegalese basketball player

CB Conquero
- Position: Forward
- League: LFB

Personal information
- Born: July 27, 1983 (age 43) Dakar, Senegal
- Listed height: 6 ft 0 in (1.83 m)

Career information
- High school: Moore Traditional School (Louisville, Kentucky)
- College: Dixie State (2001–2003); Purdue (2004–2006)
- Playing career: 2006–present

Aya Traoré (born July 27, 1983) is a Senegalese female basketball forward and in 2011 captain of Senegalese women's national basketball team.

She previously played with Polfa in the Torell Basket Liga in Poland.

== Personal ==
Traore was born in Dakar, Senegal to Seydu Traoré and Bineta Camara on 27 July 1983. She has 2 brothers and 1 sister. At Purdue, she majored in hospitality and tourism management. Traore attended high school in Louisville, Kentucky and was a Kentucky all-state performer in women's basketball in 2001. After graduating high school, Traore attended Dixie State College of Utah for 2 years. In the two years at Dixie State, Traore scored 12.3 points per game in her first season and became a second-team junior college women's basketball All-American, averaging over 21 ppg (6th in her division of basketball nationally). Traore then transferred to Purdue University, where she played for 2 seasons. During her last year at Purude, Traore averaged nearly 13 points and nearly 5 rebounds per game. Traore led Purdue to a 28–8 record before losing to the University of North Carolina in the Sweet 16 of the NCAA tournament. At the AfroBasket Women 2009 and 2015 she was nominated Most Valued Player. She is the third African player who win this title two times. With the National team of Senegal she played 5 African championships (2007 (finalist), 2009 (winner), 2011(finalist), 2013 (third) and 2015(winner)).

== Purdue statistics ==
Legend
GP	Games played	GS	Games started	MPG	Minutes per game
FG%	Field goal percentage	3P%	3-point field goal percentage	FT%	Free throw percentage
RPG	Rebounds per game	APG	Assists per game	SPG	Steals per game
BPG	Blocks per game	PPG	Points per game	**Bold**	Career high

Year	Team	GP	Points	FG%	3P%	FT%	RPG	APG	SPG	BPG	PPG
2003-04	Purdue	3	4	22.2%	0.0%	0.0%	0.3	0.3	0.3	0.0	1.3
2004-05	Purdue	30	184	40.2%	25.0%	71.7%	2.9	1.1	0.6	0.5	6.1
2005-06	Purdue	**33**	**433**	**44.6%**	**30.4%**	**79.6%**	**5.2**	**2.4**	**1.4**	**0.8**	**13.1**
Career	Purdue	66	621	42.9%	27.7%	76.8%	4.0	1.7	1.0	0.6	9.4

== Professional career ==
2006–2007 Cavigal Nice
2007–2008 PZU Polfa Pabianice, Poland
2008 MKS Polkowice, Poland
2008–2009 Hit Kranjska Gora, Kranjska Gora, Slovenia
- Montgomery Dream
2010–2011 Club Bàsquet Olesa
