= Basketball at the 2015 African Games – Women's team rosters =

This article displays the rosters for the participating teams at the 2015 All-Africa Games (women's basketball tournament).

== Algeria ==
Algeria women's national basketball team – 2015 African Games – 9th place roster
Players
Coaches

Pos.	No.	Name	Age – Date of birth	Height	Club	Ctr.
SF	4	Samiya Boudjerima	27 – 26 April 1988	1.69 m (5 ft 7 in)	Olympique Club d'Alger	(Algeria)
F	5	Nesrine Taïbi	27 – 28 June 1988	1.87 m (6 ft 2 in)	GS Pétroliers	(Algeria)
F	6	Ikbal Chenaf	31 – 21 September 1983	1.80 m (5 ft 11 in)	GS Pétroliers	(Algeria)
G	7	Nadia Isli	32 – 14 March 1983	1.68 m (5 ft 6 in)	GS Pétroliers	(Algeria)
C	8	Soumeya Regani	27 – 16 August 1988	1.92 m (6 ft 4 in)	SMUC	(France)
SF	9	Lina Mahsas	21 – 20 June 1994	1.80 m (5 ft 11 in)	Poinçonnet Basket	(France)
SG	10	Lilia Refes	20 – 11 February 1995	1.67 m (5 ft 6 in)	GS Pétroliers	(Algeria)
SF	11	Sarah Nemmouchi	26 – 8 February 1989	1.80 m (5 ft 11 in)	AS Rognac	(France)
PF	12	Nesrine Boussaid	24 – 25 October 1990	1.78 m (5 ft 10 in)	Venelles BC	(France)
G	13	Shahnez Boushaki	29 – 22 October 1985	1.75 m (5 ft 9 in)	GS Pétroliers	(Algeria)
C	14	Soulef Necib	26 – 25 January 1989	1.93 m (6 ft 4 in)	Olympique Club d'Alger	(Algeria)
F	15	Lylia Tlemsani	18 – 13 July 1997	1.85 m (6 ft 1 in)	GS Pétroliers	(Algeria)

Head coach

- (Algeria) Azzedine Labouize

Assistant coach

- (Algeria) Lyacine Belal

Legend

- (C) Team captain
- Club field describes current club

== Angola ==
Angola women's national basketball team – 2015 African Games – Bronze Medal roster
Players
Coaches

Pos.	No.	Name	Age – Date of birth	Height	Club	Ctr.
PG	4	Fineza Eusébio	25 – 18 July 1990	1.68 m (5 ft 6 in)	1º de Agosto	(Angola)
F	5	Artémis Afonso	22 – 6 January 1993	1.79 m (5 ft 10 in)	Quinta dos Lombos	(Portugal)
F	6	Felizarda Jorge	30 – 23 February 1985	1.79 m (5 ft 10 in)	Interclube	(Angola)
G	7	Rosa Gala	20 – 17 April 1995	1.73 m (5 ft 8 in)	1º de Agosto	(Angola)
PG	8	Isabel Francisco	35 – 21 July 1980	1.70 m (5 ft 7 in)	1º de Agosto	(Angola)
F	9	Marinela Muxiri	30 – 6 July 1985	1.86 m (6 ft 1 in)	Quinta dos Lombos	(Portugal)
PF	10	Sónia Guadalupe	30 – 15 September 1985	1.88 m (6 ft 2 in)	1º de Agosto	(Angola)
C	11	Luísa Tomás	32 – 24 March 1983	1.93 m (6 ft 4 in)	1º de Agosto	(Angola)
F/C	12	Ana Gonçalves	22 – 3 January 1993	1.82 m (6 ft 0 in)	1º de Agosto	(Angola)
PF	13	Nacissela Maurício (C)	35 – 2 June 1980	1.86 m (6 ft 1 in)	1º de Agosto	(Angola)
PF	14	Nadir Manuel	28 – 30 November 1986	1.88 m (6 ft 2 in)	Interclube	(Angola)
SF	15	Ngiendula Filipe	33 – 20 May 1982	1.80 m (5 ft 11 in)	Interclube	(Angola)

Head coach

- (Angola) Jaime Covilhã

Assistant coach

- (Angola) Jaqueline Francisco

Legend

- (C) Team captain
- Club field describes current club

== Cameroon ==
Cameroon women's national basketball team – 2015 African Games – 5th place roster
Players
Coaches

Pos.	No.	Name	Age – Date of birth	Height	Club	Ctr.
	4	José Kengne	26 – 5 May 1989
PG	5	Priscilla Mbiandja	26 – 20 February 1989	1.73 m (5 ft 8 in)
SF	6	Astride Njiogap	27 – 23 August 1988	1.74 m (5 ft 9 in)	INJS BC	(Cameroon)
F	7	Amina Njonkou	27 – 6 April 1988	1.85 m (6 ft 1 in)	C.P. Logrono	(Spain)
F	8	Marie Mfoula	23 – 31 May 1992	1.88 m (6 ft 2 in)	Poinçonnet Basket	(France)
SF	9	Ramses Lonlack	26 – 20 January 1989	1.75 m (5 ft 9 in)
PF	10	Nicole Jamen	27 – 17 July 1988	1.80 m (5 ft 11 in)		(Nigeria)
PF	11	Sandrine Nzeukou	25 – 30 September 1989	1.89 m (6 ft 2 in)	Jeanne d'Arc	(Senegal)
G	12	Sandrine Ayangma	24 – 25 October 1990	1.74 m (5 ft 9 in)	INJS BC	(Cameroon)
C	13	Valérie Avébé	27 – 5 March 1988	1.85 m (6 ft 1 in)	Tenerife CB	(Spain)
	14	Sandjon Kuisseu	20 – 25 September 1994
SF	15	Achiri Ade	22 – 12 March 1993	1.85 m (6 ft 1 in)	Texas A&M	(United States)

Head coach

- (Cameroon) Alain Zedong

Assistant coach

- (Cameroon) Charles Essimbi

Legend

- (C) Team captain
- Club field describes current club

== Congo ==
Congo women's national basketball team – 2015 African Games – 10th place roster
Players
Coaches

Pos.	No.	Name	Age – Date of birth	Height	Club	Ctr.
	4	Ninette Mongo	17 – 17 December 1997
	5	Lustelle Sama	18 – 2 April 1997
	6	Marlyse Mpolo	32 – 15 January 1983
	7	Hawa Kandolo	24 – 14 May 1991
	8	Sonia Massala	22 – 10 September 1993
	9	Lydie Monka	26 – 25 June 1989
	10	Rany Mbena	35 – 5 April 1980
	11	Amina Eyongo	–
	12	Olivia Mahossili	37 – 24 August 1978
	13	Carmelle Bakoueth	23 – 17 June 1992
	14	Ange Ikounga	29 – 12 April 1986
	15	Josabelle Ndandou	30 – 30 May 1985

Head coach

- (Republic of the Congo) Maxime Mbochi

Assistant coach

- (Republic of the Congo) Benjamin Boulanga

Legend

- (C) Team captain
- Club field describes current club

== Gabon ==
Gabon women's national basketball team – 2015 African Games – 8th place roster
Players
Coaches

Pos.	No.	Name	Age – Date of birth	Height	Club	Ctr.
F	4	Audrey N'nang	26 – 4 December 1988		Tama BB	(Gabon)
	5	Bernice Ngoua	31 – 20 March 1984
C	6	Anne-Marie N'to	36 – 8 September 1979	1.85 m (6 ft 1 in)	Galaxie	(Gabon)
G	7	Cynthia Mouleka	31 – 22 July 1984	1.72 m (5 ft 8 in)
F	8	Foxias Folake	24 – 9 February 1991	1.81 m (5 ft 11 in)	Tama BB	(Gabon)
G	9	Balandrina Anguiba	30 – 8 April 1985	1.66 m (5 ft 5 in)	Tama BB	(Gabon)
G	10	Joyce Tsoungui	24 – 24 November 1990	1.68 m (5 ft 6 in)	Tama BB	(Gabon)
F	11	Geraldine Robert	35 – 26 June 1980	1.85 m (6 ft 1 in)	ESBVA	(France)
G	12	Grace Mbaikoua	23 – 9 January 1992	1.80 m (5 ft 11 in)	BCTM	(France)
F	13	Marilyn Pamba	30 – 18 June 1985	1.84 m (6 ft 0 in)	SOMO B	(Gabon)
G	14	Andrée Mouele	34 – 29 July 1981	1.70 m (5 ft 7 in)	SOMO B	(Gabon)
F	15	Macolombe Moussirou	28 – 15 February 1987	1.73 m (5 ft 8 in)	SOMO B	(Gabon)

Head coach

- (Gabon) Servais Allogho

Assistant coach

- (Gabon) Parfait Tomo

Legend

- (C) Team captain
- Club field describes current club

== Ivory Coast ==
Ivory Coast women's national basketball team – 2015 African Games – 7th place roster
Players
Coaches

Pos.	No.	Name	Age – Date of birth	Height	Club	Ctr.
	4	Mariam Kamate	18 – 1 January 1997
	5	Saran Camara	23 – 20 December 1991
	6	Mamiky Cisse	23 – 16 December 1991
	7	Fatou Diabate	40 – 12 March 1975
	8	Karidja Traoré	23 – 29 May 1992
	9	Edjime Djedjemel	26 – 29 October 1988
	10	Salimata Berté	26 – 7 May 1989
	11	Kokou Kouadio	25 – 8 March 1990
	12	Hanna Amani	19 – 11 April 1996
	13	Mariam Kone	23 – 4 November 1991
	14	Mariama Kouyate	27 – 16 June 1988
	15	Minata Fofana	29 – 22 March 1986

Head coach

- (Ivory Coast) Raoul Adjei

Assistant coach

- (Ivory Coast) Kouakou Agricola

Legend

- (C) Team captain
- Club field describes current club

== Mali ==
Mali women's national basketball team – 2015 African Games – Gold medal roster
Players
Coaches

Pos.	No.	Name	Age – Date of birth	Height	Club	Ctr.
	4	Nassira Traore	26 – 28 October 1988	1.82 m (6 ft 0 in)	Jemmel	(Tunisia)
	5	Aissata Maiga	23 – 21 March 1992	1.68 m (5 ft 6 in)	Troy Athletics	(United States)
G	6	Djeneba N'Diaye	18 – 8 July 1997	1.63 m (5 ft 4 in)	Djoliba AC	(Mali)
	7	Fatoumata Bagayoko	27 – 23 May 1988	1.70 m (5 ft 7 in)	Dakar Université	(Senegal)
G	8	Diana Gandega	32 – 2 June 1983	1.70 m (5 ft 7 in)	BC Franconville	(France)
G	9	Fatim Traore	22 – 14 January 1993	1.73 m (5 ft 8 in)	Culoz BC	(Mali)
PF	10	Kankou Coulibaly	25 – 11 April 1990	1.87 m (6 ft 2 in)	CS Sfaxien	(Tunisia)
PF	11	Ramata Diakite	24 – 17 September 1991	1.88 m (6 ft 2 in)	Saint Savine	(France)
C	12	Naîgnouma Coulibaly	26 – 31 May 1989	1.92 m (6 ft 4 in)	Diósgyőri VTK	(Hungary)
F	13	Meiya Tirera	29 – 15 April 1986	1.86 m (6 ft 1 in)	Haskovo 2012	(Bulgaria)
PF	14	Ouleymatou Coulibaly	25 – 15 July 1990	1.88 m (6 ft 2 in)	Oklahoma City	(United States)
F	15	Djenebou Sacko	25 – 12 June 1990	1.85 m (6 ft 1 in)	St Louis Basket	(Senegal)

Head coach

- (Mali) Amara Traoré

Assistant coach

- (Mali) Oumarou Sidiya

Legend

- (C) Team captain
- Club field describes current club

== Mozambique ==
Mozambique women's national basketball team – 2015 African Games – 6th place roster
Players
Coaches

Pos.	No.	Name	Age – Date of birth	Height	Club	Ctr.
PG	4	Valerdina Manhonga	34 – 26 December 1980	1.66 m (5 ft 5 in)	Costa do Sol	(Mozambique)
PG	5	Deolinda Ngulela	34 – 18 April 1981	1.68 m (5 ft 6 in)	Costa do Sol	(Mozambique)
F	6	Ingvild Mucauro	23 – 12 September 1992	1.74 m (5 ft 9 in)	Ferroviário Maputo	(Mozambique)
G	7	Elizabeth Pereira	23 – 8 November 1991	1.70 m (5 ft 7 in)	Costa do Sol	(Mozambique)
	8	Ilda Chambe	28 – 19 April 1987		Costa do Sol	(Mozambique)
G	9	Iliana Ventura	25 – 14 February 1990	1.68 m (5 ft 6 in)	A Politécnica	(Mozambique)
F	10	Isabel Mavamba	23 – 10 January 1992	1.75 m (5 ft 9 in)	A Politécnica	(Mozambique)
	11	Vânia Sengo	19 – 4 July 1996	1.84 m (6 ft 0 in)	Torres Novas	(Portugal)
C	12	Vilma Covane	18 – 10 October 1996	1.88 m (6 ft 2 in)	Ferroviário Maputo	(Mozambique)
PG	13	Ornélia Mutombene	24 – 24 October 1990	1.66 m (5 ft 5 in)	Ferroviário Maputo	(Mozambique)
F	14	Odélia Mafanela	26 – 14 April 1989	1.84 m (6 ft 0 in)	Ferroviário Maputo	(Mozambique)
PF	15	Deolinda Gimo	28 – 15 August 1987	1.88 m (6 ft 2 in)	Costa do Sol	(Mozambique)

Head coach

- (Mozambique) Nazir Salé

Assistant coach

- (Mozambique) Bernardo Matsimbe

Legend

- (C) Team captain
- Club field describes current club

== Nigeria ==
Nigeria women's national basketball team – 2015 African Games – Silver medal roster
Players
Coaches

Pos.	No.	Name	Age – Date of birth	Height	Club	Ctr.
G	4	Helen Ogunjimi	30 – 26 October 1984	1.70 m (5 ft 7 in)	Bandar Abbas	(Iran)
G	5	Upe Atosu	22 – 21 April 1993	1.65 m (5 ft 5 in)	First Bank	(Nigeria)
G	6	Patience Okpe	21 – 28 August 1994	1.65 m (5 ft 5 in)	Dolphins	(Nigeria)
G	7	Sarah Ogoke	25 – 25 June 1990	1.73 m (5 ft 8 in)	Celta Selmark	(Spain)
G	8	Nkechi Akashili	25 – 22 February 1990	1.75 m (5 ft 9 in)	First Bank	(Nigeria)
G	9	Joyce Ekworomadu	29 – 6 August 1986	1.77 m (5 ft 10 in)	Harlem Globetrotters	(United States)
F	10	Nkem Akaraiwe	18 – 22 December 1996	1.85 m (6 ft 1 in)	First Bank	(Nigeria)
F	11	Adaora Elonu	25 – 28 April 1990	1.85 m (6 ft 1 in)	CB Conquero	(Spain)
PF	12	Ndidi Madu	26 – 17 March 1989	1.88 m (6 ft 2 in)	AE Sedis Bàsquet	(Spain)
	13	Chineze Nwagbo	32 – 28 November 1982			(Nigeria)
F	14	Priscilla Udeaja	31 – 29 June 1984	1.90 m (6 ft 3 in)	First Bank	(Nigeria)
C	15	Olayinka Sanni	29 – 21 August 1986	1.88 m (6 ft 2 in)	Flammes Carolo	(France)

Head coach

- (Nigeria) Scott Nnaji

Assistant coach

- (Nigeria) Adewumi Aderemi

Legend

- (C) Team captain
- Club field describes current club

== Senegal ==
Senegal women's national basketball team – 2015 African Games – 4th place roster
Players
Coaches

Pos.	No.	Name	Age – Date of birth	Height	Club	Ctr.
G	4	Oumoul Thiam	25 – 3 February 1990	1.79 m (5 ft 10 in)	CD Promete	(Spain)
G	5	Aya Traoré	32 – 27 July 1983	1.83 m (6 ft 0 in)
SF	6	Tening Diata	29 – 7 February 1986	1.83 m (6 ft 0 in)	Dakar Université	(Senegal)
PG	7	Fatou Dieng	32 – 18 August 1983	1.67 m (5 ft 6 in)	CB Caceres	(Spain)
F	8	Mame Diodio Diouf	30 – 15 December 1984	1.70 m (5 ft 7 in)	Reus	(Spain)
G	9	Ndèye Sène	27 – 18 January 1988	1.61 m (5 ft 3 in)	Saint Louis BC	(Senegal)
PF	10	Astou Traoré	34 – 30 April 1981	1.85 m (6 ft 1 in)	Saint-Amand Hainaut	(France)
C	11	Maimouna Diarra	24 – 30 January 1991	1.98 m (6 ft 6 in)		(Senegal)
PF	12	Mame Marie Sy	30 – 25 March 1985	1.85 m (6 ft 1 in)		(France)
PF	13	Oumou Touré	27 – 18 February 1988	1.89 m (6 ft 2 in)	Saint-Amand Hanaut	(France)
C	14	Ramata Daou	27 – 23 March 1988	2.02 m (6 ft 8 in)	Saint Louis BC	(Senegal)
C	15	Bineta Diouf	36 – 13 November 1978	1.84 m (6 ft 0 in)	Saumur Loire	(France)

Head coach

- (Senegal) Moustapha Gaye

Assistant coach

- (Senegal) Papa Courbary

Legend

- (C) Team captain
- Club field describes current club

== See also ==
- AfroBasket Women 2015 squads
