= 2015 FIBA Women's AfroBasket squads =

This article displays the rosters for the participating teams at the 2015 AfroBasket Women.

== Algeria ==
Algeria women's national basketball team – 2015 AfroBasket – 11th place roster
Players
Coaches

Pos.	No.	Name	Age – Date of birth	Height	Club	Ctr.
SF	4	Samiya Boudjerima	27 – 26 April 1988	1.69 m (5 ft 7 in)	OC Alger	(Algeria)
F	5	Nesrine Taïbi	27 – 28 June 1988	1.87 m (6 ft 2 in)	GS Pétroliers	(Algeria)
F	6	Ikbal Chenaf	22 – 21 September 1993	1.80 m (5 ft 11 in)	GS Pétroliers	(Algeria)
G	7	Nadia Isli	32 – 14 March 1983	1.68 m (5 ft 6 in)	GS Pétroliers	(Algeria)
C	8	Soumeya Regani	27 – 16 August 1988	1.92 m (6 ft 4 in)	SMUC Basket	(France)
SF	9	Lina Mahsas	21 – 20 June 1994	1.80 m (5 ft 11 in)	Poinçonnet Basket	(France)
SG	10	Lilia Refes	20 – 11 February 1995	1.67 m (5 ft 6 in)	GS Pétroliers	(Algeria)
SF	11	Sarah Nemmouchi	26 – 8 February 1989	1.80 m (5 ft 11 in)	AS Rognac	(France)
PF	12	Nesrine Boussaid	24 – 25 October 1990	1.78 m (5 ft 10 in)	Venelles BC	(France)
G	13	Shahnez Boushaki	29 – 22 October 1985	1.75 m (5 ft 9 in)	GS Pétroliers	(Algeria)
C	14	Soulef Nacib	26 – 25 January 1989	1.93 m (6 ft 4 in)	OC Alger	(Algeria)
F	15	Lylia Tlemsani	18 – 13 July 1997	1.85 m (6 ft 1 in)	GS Pétroliers	(Algeria)

Head coach

- (Algeria) Azeddine Labouise

Assistant coach

- (Algeria) Yacine Belal

Legend

- (C) Team captain
- Club field describes current club

== Angola ==
Angola women's national basketball team – 2015 AfroBasket – 4th place roster
Players
Coaches

Pos.	No.	Name	Age – Date of birth	Height	Club	Ctr.
PG	4	Fineza Eusébio	25 – 18 July 1990	1.68 m (5 ft 6 in)	1º de Agosto	(Angola)
G	5	Artémis Afonso	22 – 6 January 1993	1.78 m (5 ft 10 in)	Olivais Coimbra	(Portugal)
G	6	Felizarda Jorge	30 – 23 February 1985	1.79 m (5 ft 10 in)	Interclube	(Angola)
G	7	Rosa Gala	20 – 17 April 1995	1.73 m (5 ft 8 in)	1º de Agosto	(Angola)
PG	8	Isabel Francisco	35 – 21 July 1980	1.70 m (5 ft 7 in)	1º de Agosto	(Angola)
F	9	Marinela Muxiri	30 – 6 July 1985	1.86 m (6 ft 1 in)	Quinta dos Lombos	(Portugal)
F	10	Sónia Guadalupe	30 – 15 September 1985	1.88 m (6 ft 2 in)	1º de Agosto	(Angola)
C	11	Luísa Tomás	32 – 24 March 1983	1.92 m (6 ft 4 in)	1º de Agosto	(Angola)
F	12	Ana Gonçalves	22 – 3 January 1993	1.82 m (6 ft 0 in)	1º de Agosto	(Angola)
G	13	Nacissela Maurício (C)	35 – 2 June 1980	1.86 m (6 ft 1 in)	1º de Agosto	(Angola)
F	14	Nadir Manuel	28 – 30 November 1986	1.88 m (6 ft 2 in)	Interclube	(Angola)
F	15	Ngiendula Filipe	33 – 20 May 1982	1.80 m (5 ft 11 in)	Interclube	(Angola)

Head coach

- (Angola) Jaime Covilhã

Assistant coach

- (Angola) Jaqueline Francisco
- (Angola) Pedro Santos

Legend

- (C) Team captain
- Club field describes current club

== Cameroon ==
Cameroon women's national basketball team – 2015 AfroBasket – Silver medal roster
Players
Coaches

Pos.	No.	Name	Age – Date of birth	Height	Club	Ctr.
PG	4	Miesha Blackshear	27 – 29 January 1988	1.67 m (5 ft 6 in)	Dallas Diesel	(United States)
PG	5	Priscilla Mbiandja	26 – 20 February 1989	1.73 m (5 ft 8 in)	INJS	(Cameroon)
G	6	Astride Njiogap	27 – 23 August 1988	1.74 m (5 ft 9 in)	INJS	(Cameroon)
F	7	Amina Njonkou	27 – 6 April 1988	1.81 m (5 ft 11 in)	C.D. Promete	(Spain)
F	8	Marie Mfoula	23 – 31 May 1992	1.88 m (6 ft 2 in)	Poinçonnet Basket	(France)
SF	9	Ramses Lonlack	26 – 20 January 1989	1.75 m (5 ft 9 in)	Dallas Diesel	(United States)
F	10	Nicole Jamen	27 – 17 July 1988	1.80 m (5 ft 11 in)		(United States)
PF	11	Sandrine Nzeukou	26 – 30 September 1989	1.89 m (6 ft 2 in)		(United States)
G	12	Sandrine Ayangma	28 – 25 October 1986	1.74 m (5 ft 9 in)	INJS	(Cameroon)
C	13	Florence Avébé	27 – 5 March 1988	1.85 m (6 ft 1 in)	C.B. Clarinos	(Spain)
SF	14	Achiri Ade	22 – 12 March 1993	1.85 m (6 ft 1 in)	Texas A&M	(United States)
C	15	Beatrice Bofia	30 – 9 November 1984	2.02 m (6 ft 8 in)	Arizona Wildcats	(United States)

Head coach

- (Cameroon) Alain Zedong

Assistant coach

- (Cameroon) Ethel Essimbi

Legend

- (C) Team captain
- Club field describes current club

== Egypt ==
Egypt women's national basketball team – 2015 AfroBasket – 8th place roster
Players
Coaches

Pos.	No.	Name	Age – Date of birth	Height	Club	Ctr.
G	4	Soraia Deghady	20 – 16 July 1995		Shooting Club	(Egypt)
PF	5	Nouralla Abdelalim	18 – 15 June 1997	1.85 m (6 ft 1 in)	Al Ahly	(Egypt)
PG	8	Sara Masoud	23 – 3 January 1992	1.77 m (5 ft 10 in)	Gezira	(Egypt)
G	9	Reem Osama	22 – 28 June 1993	1.71 m (5 ft 7 in)	Smouha	(Egypt)
C	10	Laila Abdelrahma	22 – 8 October 1992	1.86 m (6 ft 1 in)	Al Ahly	(Egypt)
F	12	Farida Abdelnabi	20 – 22 May 1995	1.79 m (5 ft 10 in)	Heliopolis SC	(Egypt)
F	14	Menatalla Awad	24 – 10 September 1991	1.78 m (5 ft 10 in)	Sporting Alexandria	(Egypt)
PF	15	Raneem El-Gedawy	18 – 24 February 1997	1.88 m (6 ft 2 in)	Sporting Alexandria	(Egypt)
F	35	Nadine Mohamed	17 – 21 January 1998	1.80 m (5 ft 11 in)	Al Ahly	(Egypt)
C	41	Fatma Aly	18 – 3 February 1997	1.96 m (6 ft 5 in)	Smouha	(Egypt)
G	50	Sara Nady	18 – 10 May 1997	1.75 m (5 ft 9 in)	Shooting Club	(Egypt)
F	88	Laila Elkousy	18 – 29 August 1997	1.80 m (5 ft 11 in)	Shooting Club	(Egypt)

Head coach

- (Egypt) Tarek Elkattan

Assistant coach

- (Egypt) Mohamed Eljaky

Legend

- (C) Team captain
- Club field describes current club

== Gabon ==
Gabon women's national basketball team – 2015 AfroBasket – 7th place roster
Players
Coaches

Pos.	No.	Name	Age – Date of birth	Height	Club	Ctr.
F	4	Audrey N'Nang	26 – 4 December 1988		Tama BB	(Gabon)
G	5	Tania Angue	31 – 20 March 1984	1.68 m (5 ft 6 in)	Somo BB	(Gabon)
C	6	Anne-Marie Nto	36 – 8 September 1979	1.85 m (6 ft 1 in)	Galaxie BB	(Gabon)
G	7	Cynthia Mouleka	31 – 22 July 1984	1.72 m (5 ft 8 in)	Tama BB	(Gabon)
F	8	Foxias Folake	24 – 9 February 1991	1.81 m (5 ft 11 in)	Tama BB	(Gabon)
G	9	Balandrina Anguiba	30 – 8 April 1985	1.66 m (5 ft 5 in)	Tama BB	(Gabon)
G	10	Joyce Tsoungui	24 – 24 November 1990	1.68 m (5 ft 6 in)	Tama BB	(Gabon)
F	11	Geraldine Robert	35 – 26 June 1980	1.85 m (6 ft 1 in)	Villeneuve-d'Ascq	(France)
G	12	Grace Mbaikoua	23 – 9 January 1992	1.80 m (5 ft 11 in)	BC La Tronche	(France)
F	13	Marilyn Pamba	30 – 18 June 1985	1.84 m (6 ft 0 in)	Somo BB	(Gabon)
G	14	Andrée Mouele	34 – 29 July 1981	1.70 m (5 ft 7 in)	Somo BB	(Gabon)
F	15	Yabale Kopia	28 – 15 February 1987	1.73 m (5 ft 8 in)	Somo BB	(Gabon)

Head coach

- (Gabon) Servais Essonghe

Assistant coach

- (Gabon) Parfait Abaga

Legend

- (C) Team captain
- Club field describes current club

== Guinea ==
Guinea women's national basketball team – 2015 AfroBasket – 9th place roster
Players
Coaches

Pos.	No.	Name	Age – Date of birth	Height	Club	Ctr.
PG	4	Aminata Sylla	41 – 24 June 1974	1.70 m (5 ft 7 in)	FUS de Rabat	(Morocco)
PG	6	Fanta Sidimé	22 – 1 January 1993	1.83 m (6 ft 0 in)	Horoya AC	(Guinea)
F	8	Khady Mbaye	33 – 6 November 1981	1.69 m (5 ft 7 in)	Dakar University Club	(Senegal)
F	10	Mariama Touré	21 – 1 January 1994		Horoya AC	(Guinea)
C	11	Fanta Bérété	20 – 16 April 1995	1.80 m (5 ft 11 in)	Horoya AC	(Guinea)
F	12	Fatou Bah	30 – 16 July 1985	1.88 m (6 ft 2 in)	Pays d'Aix	(France)
C	13	Mireille Sylla	26 – 10 October 1988	1.82 m (6 ft 0 in)	Horoya AC	(Guinea)
F	14	Nadia Niang	37 – 16 January 1978	1.84 m (6 ft 0 in)
C	15	Simone Keita	21 – 26 March 1994	1.81 m (5 ft 11 in)	Horoya AC	(Guinea)

Head coach

- (Guinea) Ousmane Sylla

Assistant coach

- (Guinea) Ibrahima Toure

Legend

- (C) Team captain
- Club field describes current club

== Mali ==
Mali women's national basketball team – 2015 AfroBasket – 5th place roster
Players
Coaches

Pos.	No.	Name	Age – Date of birth	Height	Club	Ctr.
G	4	Nassira Traoré	26 – 28 October 1988	1.86 m (6 ft 1 in)	Stade Malien	(Mali)
G	5	Aissata Maiga	23 – 21 March 1992	1.68 m (5 ft 6 in)	Troy Trojans	(United States)
G	6	Djeneba N'Diaye	18 – 8 July 1997	1.63 m (5 ft 4 in)	Djoliba AC	(Mali)
G	7	Fatoumata Bagayoko	27 – 23 May 1988	1.70 m (5 ft 7 in)	DUC	(Senegal)
G	8	Diana Gandega	32 – 2 June 1983	1.68 m (5 ft 6 in)	BC Francoville	(France)
G	9	Fatim Traore	22 – 14 January 1993	1.73 m (5 ft 8 in)	Culoz BC	(France)
	10	Kankou Coulibaly	25 – 11 April 1990	1.87 m (6 ft 2 in)	CS Sfaxien	(Tunisia)
PF	11	Ramata Diakite	24 – 17 September 1991	1.88 m (6 ft 2 in)	Saint Savine	(France)
	12	Naîgnouma Coulibaly	26 – 31 May 1989	1.92 m (6 ft 4 in)	Aluinvent Miskolc	(Hungary)
	13	Meiya Tireira	29 – 15 April 1986	1.87 m (6 ft 2 in)	BC Haskovo	(Bulgaria)
PF	14	Ouleymatou Coulibaly	25 – 15 July 1990	1.88 m (6 ft 2 in)	OCU Stars	(United States)
F	15	Djenebou Sacko	25 – 12 June 1990	1.85 m (6 ft 1 in)	St Louis BC	(Senegal)

Head coach

- (Mali) Amara Traore

Assistant coach

- (Mali) Hamchétou Maïga

Legend

- (C) Team captain
- Club field describes current club

== Mozambique ==
Mozambique women's national basketball team – 2015 AfroBasket – 6th place roster
Players
Coaches

Pos.	No.	Name	Age – Date of birth	Height	Club	Ctr.
PG	4	Valerdina Manhonga	34 – 26 December 1980	1.66 m (5 ft 5 in)	Costa do Sol	(Mozambique)
PG	5	Deolinda Ngulela	34 – 18 April 1981	1.68 m (5 ft 6 in)	Costa do Sol	(Mozambique)
F	6	Ingvild Mucauro	23 – 12 September 1992	1.74 m (5 ft 9 in)	Ferroviário Maputo	(Mozambique)
G	7	Elizabeth Pereira	23 – 8 November 1991	1.70 m (5 ft 7 in)	Costa do Sol	(Mozambique)
G	8	Filomena Micato	29 – 26 January 1986	1.70 m (5 ft 7 in)	Costa do Sol	(Mozambique)
G	9	Iliana Ventura	25 – 14 February 1990	1.68 m (5 ft 6 in)	A Politécnica	(Mozambique)
F	10	Isabel Mavamba	23 – 10 January 1992	1.75 m (5 ft 9 in)	A Politécnica	(Mozambique)
PF	11	Dionilde Cuamba	22 – 15 February 1993	1.84 m (6 ft 0 in)	A Politécnica	(Mozambique)
C	12	Vilma Covane	18 – 10 October 1996	1.88 m (6 ft 2 in)	Ferroviário Maputo	(Mozambique)
PG	13	Ornélia Mutombene	24 – 24 October 1990	1.66 m (5 ft 5 in)	Ferroviário Maputo	(Mozambique)
F	14	Odélia Mafanela	26 – 14 April 1989	1.84 m (6 ft 0 in)	Ferroviário Maputo	(Mozambique)
PF	15	Deolinda Gimo	28 – 15 August 1987	1.88 m (6 ft 2 in)	Costa do Sol	(Mozambique)

Head coach

- (Mozambique) Nasir Salé

Assistant coach

- (Mozambique) Bernardo Matsimbe
- (Mozambique) Dilar Dessai

Legend

- (C) Team captain
- Club field describes current club

== Nigeria ==
Nigeria women's national basketball team – 2015 AfroBasket – Bronze medal roster
Players
Coaches

Pos.	No.	Name	Age – Date of birth	Height	Club	Ctr.
G	4	Helen Ogunjimi	30 – 26 October 1984	1.70 m (5 ft 7 in)	Bandar Abbas	(Iran)
G	5	Upe Atosu	22 – 21 April 1993	1.65 m (5 ft 5 in)	First Bank	(Nigeria)
G	6	Patience Okpe	21 – 28 August 1994	1.65 m (5 ft 5 in)	Dolphins	(Nigeria)
G	7	Sarah Ogoke	25 – 25 June 1990	1.77 m (5 ft 10 in)	Celta de Vigo	(Spain)
G	8	Nkechi Akashili	25 – 22 February 1990	1.75 m (5 ft 9 in)	First Bank	(Nigeria)
G	9	Joyce Ekworomadu	29 – 6 August 1986	1.77 m (5 ft 10 in)	H. Globetrotters	(United States)
F	10	Nkem Akaraiwe	18 – 22 December 1996	1.85 m (6 ft 1 in)	First Bank	(Nigeria)
F	11	Adaora Elonu	25 – 28 April 1990	1.85 m (6 ft 1 in)	CB Conquero	(Spain)
PF	12	Ndidi Madu	26 – 17 March 1989	1.88 m (6 ft 2 in)	AE Sedis Bàsquet	(Spain)
C	13	Edema Edeferioka	22 – 10 April 1993	1.93 m (6 ft 4 in)	Georgia Tech	(United States)
F	14	Priscilla Udeaja	31 – 29 June 1984	1.90 m (6 ft 3 in)	First Bank	(Nigeria)
C	15	Olayinka Sanni	29 – 21 August 1986	1.88 m (6 ft 2 in)	Flammes Carolo	(France)

Head coach

- (Nigeria) Scott Nnaji

Assistant coach

- (Nigeria) Aderemi Adewunmi

Legend

- (C) Team captain
- Club field describes current club

== Senegal ==
Senegal women's national basketball team – 2015 AfroBasket – Gold Medal roster
Players
Coaches

Pos.	No.	Name	Age – Date of birth	Height	Club	Ctr.
G	4	Oumoul Thiam	25 – 3 February 1990	1.79 m (5 ft 10 in)	C.D. Promete	(Spain)
G	5	Aya Traoré	32 – 27 July 1983	1.83 m (6 ft 0 in)	CDB Zaragoza	(Spain)
SF	6	Tening Diata	29 – 7 February 1986	1.83 m (6 ft 0 in)	DUC	(Senegal)
PG	7	Fatou Dieng	32 – 18 August 1983	1.67 m (5 ft 6 in)	CB Al-Qázeres	(Spain)
F	8	Mame Diodio Diouf	30 – 15 December 1984	1.70 m (5 ft 7 in)	Reus Deportiu	(Spain)
G	9	Ndèye Sène	27 – 18 January 1988	1.61 m (5 ft 3 in)	Saint Louis BC	(Senegal)
PF	10	Astou Traoré	34 – 30 April 1981	1.85 m (6 ft 1 in)	Saint-Amand	(France)
C	11	Maimouna Diarra	24 – 30 January 1991	1.98 m (6 ft 6 in)	Primeiro de Agosto	(Angola)
PF	12	Mame Marie Sy	30 – 25 March 1985	1.85 m (6 ft 1 in)
PF	13	Oumou Touré	27 – 18 February 1988	1.89 m (6 ft 2 in)	Saint-Amand	(France)
C	14	Ramata Daou	27 – 23 March 1988	2.02 m (6 ft 8 in)	Saint Louis BC	(Senegal)
C	15	Bineta Diouf	36 – 13 November 1978	1.84 m (6 ft 0 in)	Saumur Loire	(France)

Head coach

- (Senegal) Mamadou Gaye

Assistant coach

- (Senegal) Papa Courbary
- (Senegal) Elhadji Diop

Legend

- (C) Team captain
- Club field describes current club

== South Africa ==
South Africa women's national basketball team – 2015 AfroBasket – 12th place roster
Players
Coaches

Pos.	No.	Name	Age – Date of birth	Height	Club	Ctr.
SF	4	Modiegi Mokoka	23 – 4 July 1992	1.69 m (5 ft 7 in)	Wits University	(South Africa)
SG	5	Veranique Samuels	27 – 19 September 1988	1.71 m (5 ft 7 in)	Cape University	(South Africa)
SG	6	Zanele Ndaba	23 – 8 January 1992	1.61 m (5 ft 3 in)	Vaal University	(South Africa)
SF	7	Fortunate Bosega	22 – 3 September 1993	1.72 m (5 ft 8 in)	Wits University	(South Africa)
SF	8	Takalani Mfamadi	26 – 26 October 1988	1.77 m (5 ft 10 in)
G	9	Lungile Mtsweni	30 – 26 June 1985	1.76 m (5 ft 9 in)	Galaxy	(South Africa)
PG	10	Ellen Moutlwatse	29 – 27 February 1986		Soweto Raptors	(South Africa)
F	11	Lindiwe Shabangu	20 – 6 April 1995		Vaal University	(South Africa)
G	12	Nosipho Njokweni	34 – 25 March 1981		V& J	(South Africa)
G	13	Philadelphia Khoabane	28 – 16 August 1987	1.79 m (5 ft 10 in)	Qwaqwa Hawks	(South Africa)
C	14	Sophi Ngobene	24 – 6 January 1991	1.85 m (6 ft 1 in)	Cape University	(South Africa)
G	15	Buiyswa Gwangwa	20 – 5 December 1994	1.59 m (5 ft 3 in)	Cape University	(South Africa)

Head coach

- (South Africa) Kimathi Toboti

Assistant coach

- (South Africa) Asnath Digamela
- (South Africa) Nomalanga Hlophe

Legend

- (C) Team captain
- Club field describes current club

== Uganda ==
Uganda women's national basketball team – 2015 AfroBasket - 11th place roster
Players
Coaches

Pos.	No.	Name	Age – Date of birth	Height	Club	Ctr.
PG	4	Flavia Oketcho	29 – 16 July 1986	1.70 m (5 ft 7 in)	KCCA Leopards	(Uganda)
SF	5	Monica Siima	39 – 29 July 1976	1.73 m (5 ft 8 in)	KCCA Leopards	(Uganda)
SG	6	Judith Nansobya	28 – 10 October 1986	1.70 m (5 ft 7 in)	Uganda Univ.	(Uganda)
PG	7	Sylvia Nakazibwe	20 – 2 April 1995	1.78 m (5 ft 10 in)	A1 Challenge	(Uganda)
	8	Lisa de Ruijter	27 – 27 September 1988		Amazone AUB	(Uganda)
SG	9	Rebecca Akulo	32 – 28 May 1983	1.78 m (5 ft 10 in)	KCCA Leopards	(Uganda)
SG	10	Moreen Amoding	25 – 21 September 1990	1.70 m (5 ft 7 in)	A1 Challenge	(Uganda)
C	11	Proscovia Peace	25 – 1 November 1989	1.93 m (6 ft 4 in)	KCCA Leopards	(Uganda)
PF	12	Sharon Karungi	25 – 16 September 1990		free agent
SF	13	Vicky Nassolo	31 – 2 August 1984	1.80 m (5 ft 11 in)	A1 Challenge	(Uganda)
PF	14	Muhayimina Namuwaya	27 – 1 January 1988	1.83 m (6 ft 0 in)	KCCA Leopards
C	15	Martha Soigi	28 – 18 December 1986	1.85 m (6 ft 1 in)	KCCA Leopards	(Uganda)

Head coach

- (Uganda) Ayeet Odeke

Assistant coach

- (Uganda) Zumrati Mavita

Legend

- (C) Team captain
- Club field describes current club

== See also ==
- 2015 FIBA Africa Women's Clubs Champions Cup squads
