= 2015 FIBA Women's AfroBasket =

22nd FIBA Women's African Basketball Championship

Tournament details
- Host country: Cameroon
- City: Yaoundé
- Dates: 24 September – 3 October
- Teams: 12 (from 53 federations)
- Venue(s): 1 (in 1 host city)

Final positions
- Champions: Senegal (11th title)

Tournament statistics
- MVP: (Senegal) Aya Traoré
- Top scorer: (Gabon) Robert (20.4)
- Top rebounds: (Uganda) Peace (12.7)
- Top assists: (Mozambique) Ngulela (4.9)
- PPG (Team): Nigeria (76.0)
- RPG (Team): Nigeria (48.9)
- APG (Team): Nigeria; Senegal (17.1)

Official website
- www.fiba.basketball/history

The 2015 FIBA Women's AfroBasket was the 22nd AfroBasket Women, played under the rules of FIBA, the world governing body for basketball, and FIBA Africa. The tournament was hosted by Cameroon from 24 September to 3 October 2015, with games played in Yaoundé. The winners qualified for the 2016 Summer Olympics.

Senegal won the title for the eleventh time by defeating hosts Cameroon in the final, 81–66.

== Draw ==
Group A	Group B
Cameroon; Mozambique; South Africa; Gabon; Uganda; Mali	Angola; Senegal; Guinea; Egypt; Algeria; Nigeria

== Preliminary round ==
The draw was held on 9 May 2015.

All times are local (UTC+1).

=== Group A ===
Pos	Team	Pld	W	L	PF	PA	PD	Pts	Qualification
1	Cameroon	5	5	0	343	238	+105	10	Advanced to knockout stage
2	Mali	5	4	1	313	241	+72	9	Advanced to knockout stage
3	Mozambique	5	3	2	344	267	+77	8	Advanced to knockout stage
4	Gabon	5	2	3	309	298	+11	7	Advanced to knockout stage
5	Uganda	5	1	4	233	345	−112	6	Advanced to classification round
6	South Africa	5	0	5	206	359	−153	5	Advanced to classification round

Source: FIBA
Rules for classification: 1) Points; 2) Head-to-head results; 3) Points difference; 4) Points scored.

24 September 2015
09:30

Boxscore

Gabon	70–39	Uganda
Scoring by quarter: 18–9, 11–16, 20–8, 21–6
Pts: Mbaikoua 20; Rebs: Robert 17; Asts: Angue 4		Pts: Oketcho, Peace 9 Rebs: Soigi 11; Asts: Soigi 2

Yaoundé
Referees: Annie Muchenu (ZIM), Ndeye Diagne (SEN), Samuel Shofoluwe (NGR)

24 September 2015
14:00

Boxscore

South Africa	27–69	Mali
Scoring by quarter: 6–18, 7–17, 8–19, 6–15
Pts: Njonkou, Shabangu 8 Rebs: Bosega 6 Asts: Khoabane 3		Pts: K. Coulibaly 11; Rebs: Diakité 8 Asts: Tirera 4

Yaoundé
Referees: Wael Abdel Hay (EGY), Antonio Bernardo (ANG), Nadjet Zenagui (ALG)

24 September 2015
18:30

Boxscore

Cameroon	68–54	Mozambique
Scoring by quarter: 17–13, 10–17, 15–11, 26–13
Pts: Lonlack, Mbiandja 12; Rebs: Lonlack 7 Asts: Lonlack 5		Pts: Ngulela 19; Rebs: Mucauro 8 Asts: four players 1

Yaoundé
Referees: Maripier Malo (CAN), Jelena Tomić (CRO), Nadege Zouzou (CIV)

25 September 2015
09:30

Boxscore

Mozambique	73–50	Uganda
Scoring by quarter: 20–11, 13–19, 24–9, 16–11
Pts: Micato 15; Rebs: Mafanela 9 Asts: three players 3		Pts: Amoding, Soigi 12; Rebs: Namuwaya 13; Asts: Oketcho, Soigi 3

Yaoundé
Referees: Wael Abdel Hay (EGY), Antonio Bernardo (ANG), Ndeye Diagne (SEN)

25 September 2015
14:00

Boxscore

South Africa	42–71	Gabon
Scoring by quarter: 12–19, 10–17, 9–18, 11–17
Pts: Shabangu 15; Rebs: Ngobeni 8 Asts: Moutlwatse 3		Pts: Mbaikoua 22; Rebs: Robert 23; Asts: Robert 7

Yaoundé
Referees: Nadege Zouzou (CIV), Samuel Shofoluwe (NGR), Nadjet Zenagui (ALG)

25 September 2015
18:30

Boxscore

Cameroon	44–43	Mali
Scoring by quarter: 9–11, 14–11, 12–11, 9–10
Pts: Lonlack 12; Rebs: Njonkou 9 Asts: Lonlack 5		Pts: Bagayoko, F. Traoré 9 Rebs: N. Coulibaly 10; Asts: Bagayoko 2

Yaoundé
Referees: Chahinaz Bousseta (MAR), Jasmina Juras (SRB), Sarty Nghixulifwa (NAM)

26 September 2015
09:30

Boxscore

Mozambique	86–43	South Africa
Scoring by quarter: 20–13, 11–11, 32–4, 23–15
Pts: Gimo 19; Rebs: Gimo 10; Asts: Mutombene 6		Pts: Mtsweni, Shabangu 11; Rebs: Shabangu 5 Asts: Moutlwatse 5

Yaoundé

26 September 2015
18:30

Boxscore

Uganda	34–86	Cameroon
Scoring by quarter: 6–16, 8–22, 6–25, 14–23
Pts: Amoding 10; Rebs: Peace 11; Asts: Nakazibwe 2		Pts: Lonlack 15; Rebs: Ade 7 Asts: Mbiandja 4

Yaoundé

26 September 2015
20:45

Boxscore

Mali	71–63	Gabon
Scoring by quarter: 15–17, 29–16, 19–12, 8–18
Pts: K. Coulibaly 18; Rebs: K. Coulibaly 8 Asts: Tirera 5		Pts: Robert 25; Rebs: Robert 7 Asts: Robert 5

Yaoundé

28 September 2015
11:45

Boxscore

Uganda	55–43	South Africa
Scoring by quarter: 11–9, 15–10, 17–14, 12–10
Pts: Amoding, Nansobya 12; Rebs: Peace 12; Asts: Oketcho 5		Pts: Mfamadi 14; Rebs: Ngobeni 11; Asts: Bosega 6

Yaoundé

28 September 2015
16:15

Boxscore

Mali	57–52	Mozambique
Scoring by quarter: 11–15, 21–11, 15–12, 10–14
Pts: K. Coulibaly 16; Rebs: N. Coulibaly 18; Asts: N. Coulibaly 3		Pts: Ngulela 16; Rebs: Gimo 7 Asts: Ngulela 3

Yaoundé

28 September 2015
18:30

Boxscore

Cameroon	67–56	Gabon
Scoring by quarter: 11–18, 26–3, 14–28, 16–7
Pts: Lonlack 13; Rebs: Njonkou 11; Asts: Lonlack 4		Pts: Robert 20; Rebs: Robert 9 Asts: Robert 5

Yaoundé

29 September 2015
09:30

Boxscore

Uganda	55–73	Mali
Scoring by quarter: 16–22, 6–17, 14–15, 19–19
Pts: Oketcho 16; Rebs: Peace 12; Asts: Oketcho 4		Pts: K. Coulibaly 19; Rebs: Diakité 13; Asts: Bagayoko 5

Yaoundé

29 September 2015
18:30

Boxscore

South Africa	51–78	Cameroon
Scoring by quarter: 7–19, 5–20, 15–25, 20–25
Pts: Moutlwatse 13; Rebs: Ngobeni 8 Asts: Moutlwatse 4		Pts: Lonlack 18; Rebs: Njonkou 8 Asts: Gano 5

Yaoundé

29 September 2015
20:45

Boxscore

Gabon	49–79	Mozambique
Scoring by quarter: 10–19, 14–17, 8–22, 17–21
Pts: Robert 18; Rebs: Robert 7 Asts: Robert 6		Pts: Mafanela 23; Rebs: Covane 6 Asts: Mucauro 6

Yaoundé

=== Group B ===
Pos	Team	Pld	W	L	PF	PA	PD	Pts	Qualification
1	Angola	5	4	1	319	250	+69	9 (Note: Angola–Nigeria 57–51)	Advanced to knockout stage
2	Nigeria	5	4	1	402	285	+117	9	Advanced to knockout stage
3	Senegal	5	3	2	366	303	+63	8 (Note: Egypt–Senegal 72–84)	Advanced to knockout stage
4	Egypt	5	3	2	370	361	+9	8	Advanced to knockout stage
5	Guinea	5	1	4	278	438	−160	6	Advanced to classification round
6	Algeria	5	0	5	285	383	−98	5	Advanced to classification round

Source: FIBA
Rules for classification: 1) Points; 2) Head-to-head results; 3) Points difference; 4) Points scored.
Notes:

24 September 2015
11:45

Boxscore

Egypt	96–55	Algeria
Scoring by quarter: 27–14, 25–8, 17–21, 27–12
Pts: Mohamed 22; Rebs: Aly, Awad 10; Asts: Masoud 7		Pts: Boussaid 14; Rebs: Boussaid 6 Asts: Nemmouchi 4

Yaoundé
Referees: Artur de Castro (MOZ), Sassi Camara (MLI), Natascha Wiese (RSA)

24 September 2015
20:45

Boxscore

Angola	50–46	Senegal
Scoring by quarter: 18–19, 7–10, 15–14, 10–3
Pts: Jorge, Maurício 11; Rebs: Manuel 11; Asts: Eusébio 3		Pts: As. Traoré 15; Rebs: Ay. Traoré 7 Asts: Dieng 5

Yaoundé
Referees: Marko Juras (SRB), Sarty Nghixulifwa (NAM), Ingrid Nzame (GAB)

25 September 2015
11:45

Boxscore

Guinea	73–81	Egypt
Scoring by quarter: 19–23, 15–25, 23–21, 16–12
Pts: Peruch Niang 20; Rebs: Mepouyi Sylla 9 Asts: Sylla 4		Pts: El-Gedawy 19; Rebs: El-Gedawy 17; Asts: Masoud 5

Yaoundé
Referees: Annie Muchenu (ZIM), Sassi Camara (MLI), Ingrid Nzame (GAB)

25 September 2015
16:15

Boxscore

Senegal	70–62	Algeria
Scoring by quarter: 17–12, 19–17, 20–13, 14–20
Pts: three players 12; Rebs: Diarra 11; Asts: Sy 5		Pts: Mahsas 19; Rebs: Boushaki 6 Asts: Boussaid 3

Yaoundé
Referees: Artur de Castro (MOZ), Peter Kirabo (UGA), Natascha Wiese (RSA)

25 September 2015
20:45

Boxscore

Angola	57–51	Nigeria
Scoring by quarter: 11–12, 13–9, 17–18, 16–12
Pts: Guadalupe 15; Rebs: Filipe 10; Asts: Eusébio, Francisco 4		Pts: Sanni 12; Rebs: Madu 13; Asts: Ogunjimi 4

Yaoundé
Referees: Maripier Malo (CAN), Laurie Meboung (CMR), Jelena Tomić (CRO)

26 September 2015
11:45

Boxscore

Nigeria	97–68	Egypt
Scoring by quarter: 29–12, 32–16, 17–23, 19–17
Pts: Elonu 20; Rebs: Edeferioka 11; Asts: Ogoke 7		Pts: Awad 20; Rebs: Awad, El-Gedawy 10; Asts: Nady 3

Yaoundé

26 September 2015
14:00

Boxscore

Senegal	102–44	Guinea
Scoring by quarter: 30–14, 23–10, 27–7, 22–13
Pts: As. Traoré 24; Rebs: O. Touré 8 Asts: Dieng 8		Pts: Peruch Niang 11; Rebs: Bérété 6 Asts: Peruch Niang 3

Yaoundé

26 September 2015
16:15

Boxscore

Algeria	53–71	Angola
Scoring by quarter: 9–16, 12–24, 15–13, 17–18
Pts: Mahsas 18; Rebs: Mahsas, Nemmouchi 6 Asts: Boussaid, Nemmouchi 4		Pts: Tomás 13; Rebs: Tomás 9 Asts: Francisco, Maurício 3

Yaoundé

27 September 2015
15:00

Boxscore

Guinea	47–100	Nigeria
Scoring by quarter: 9–25, 19–18, 12–30, 7–27
Pts: Peruch Niang 17; Rebs: Peruch Niang 7 Asts: Mbaye 4		Pts: Ogunjimi 19; Rebs: Edeferioka 10; Asts: Ogoke 12

Yaoundé

28 September 2015
09:30

Boxscore

Algeria	66–67	Guinea
Scoring by quarter: 24–18, 17–20, 18–14, 7–15
Pts: Mahsas 20; Rebs: Regani 7 Asts: Nemmouchi 6		Pts: M. Touré 19; Rebs: M. Touré 7 Asts: Sylla 3

Yaoundé

28 September 2015
14:00

Boxscore

Angola	52–53	Egypt
Scoring by quarter: 16–16, 11–11, 11–15, 14–11
Pts: three players 9 Rebs: Manuel 11; Asts: Francisco 3		Pts: Awad 16; Rebs: Awad 10; Asts: Mohamed 5

Yaoundé

28 September 2015
20:45

Boxscore

Nigeria	75–64	Senegal
Scoring by quarter: 13–11, 27–18, 20–20, 15–16
Pts: Ogoke 18; Rebs: Sanni, Udeaja 9 Asts: Ogoke 4		Pts: Sy 15; Rebs: Diarra 13; Asts: Dieng 6

Yaoundé

29 September 2015
11:45

Boxscore

Egypt	72–84	Senegal
Scoring by quarter: 17–25, 12–20, 18–28, 25–11
Pts: Osama 25; Rebs: El-Gedawy 7 Asts: Masoud 4		Pts: As. Traoré 22; Rebs: Diarra 11; Asts: As. Traoré 6

Yaoundé

29 September 2015
14:00

Boxscore

Algeria	49–79	Nigeria
Scoring by quarter: 13–15, 8–15, 8–24, 20–25
Pts: Nemmouchi 13; Rebs: Taïbi 9 Asts: Boushaki 3		Pts: Akashili, Elonu 15; Rebs: Madu 11; Asts: Ekworomadu 4

Yaoundé

29 September 2015
16:15

Boxscore

Guinea	47–89	Angola
Scoring by quarter: 7–19, 5–20, 15–25, 20–25
Pts: Peruch Niang 13; Rebs: Keita, Touré 4 Asts: Mbaye 4		Pts: Manuel 21; Rebs: Muxiri 10; Asts: three players 3

Yaoundé

== Knockout stage ==
=== Bracket ===
Quarter-finals
1 October
Egypt	54
Cameroon	76
1 October
Mozambique	66
Nigeria	71
1 October
Gabon	44
Angola	57
1 October
Senegal	57
Mali	38

Semi-finals
2 October
Cameroon	71
Nigeria	70
2 October
Angola	54
Senegal	56

Final
3 October
Cameroon	66
Senegal	81
Third place
3 October
Nigeria	65
Angola	55

5th place bracket

5–8th place semifinals
2 October
Egypt	76
Mozambique	99
2 October
Gabon	52
Mali	71

Fifth place
3 October
Mozambique	68
Mali	69
Seventh place
3 October
Egypt	67
Gabon	71

9th place bracket

9–12th place semifinals
1 October
Algeria	73
Uganda	75
1 October
South Africa	57
Guinea	61

Ninth place
2 October
Uganda	52
Guinea	53
Eleventh place
2 October
Algeria	87
South Africa	49

=== Quarterfinals ===
1 October 2015
14:30

Boxscore

Mozambique	66–71	Nigeria
Scoring by quarter: 13–20, 23–21, 18–12, 12–18
Pts: Mafanela 18; Rebs: Mafanela 11; Asts: Mucauro, Ngulela 4		Pts: Ekworomadu 20; Rebs: Madu 13; Asts: Ogunjimi 4

Yaoundé

1 October 2015
16:45

Boxscore

Senegal	57–38	Mali
Scoring by quarter: 14–18, 14–8, 15–0, 14–12
Pts: As. Traoré 20; Rebs: Diarra, O. Touré 9 Asts: Dieng, Sy 3		Pts: Tirera 11; Rebs: N. Coulibaly 9 Asts: Tirera 4

Yaoundé

1 October 2015
19:00

Boxscore

Egypt	54–76	Cameroon
Scoring by quarter: 14–25, 7–20, 17–14, 16–17
Pts: Mohamed 12; Rebs: Aly 7 Asts: Deghady 3		Pts: Lonlack 20; Rebs: Senken Jamen 7 Asts: Mbiandja 8

Yaoundé

1 October 2015
21:15

Boxscore

Gabon	44–57	Angola
Scoring by quarter: 15–12, 6–16, 7–17, 16–12
Pts: Robert 14; Rebs: Robert 13; Asts: Robert 5		Pts: Mauricio 12; Rebs: Mauricio 8 Asts: Francisco 2

Yaoundé

=== 9–12 place semifinals ===
1 October 2015
10:00

Boxscore

Algeria	73–75	Uganda
Scoring by quarter: 16–19, 15–11, 20–14, 22–31
Pts: Mahsas 29; Rebs: Nemmouchi, Regani 7 Asts: Mahsas 5		Pts: Oketcho 23; Rebs: Namuwaya, Peace 15; Asts: Oketcho 5

Yaoundé

1 October 2015
12:15

Boxscore

South Africa	57–61	Guinea
Scoring by quarter: 6–21, 16–8, 20–13, 15–19
Pts: Mfamadi 21; Rebs: Ngobeni 12; Asts: Gwangwa 4		Pts: M. Touré 19; Rebs: Keita 10; Asts: Mbaye 4

Yaoundé

=== 5–8th place semifinals ===
2 October 2015
14:30

Boxscore

Egypt	76–99	Mozambique
Scoring by quarter: 23–24, 16–27, 29–20, 8–28
Pts: Awad 20; Rebs: Aly 9 Asts: Masoud 3		Pts: Ngulela 32; Rebs: Mafanela 13; Asts: Ngulela 12

Yaoundé

2 October 2015
16:45

Boxscore

Gabon	52–71	Mali
Scoring by quarter: 13–17, 15–16, 8–20, 16–18
Pts: Robert 18; Rebs: Robert 9 Asts: three players 2		Pts: N. Coulibaly 15; Rebs: N. Coulibaly 7 Asts: Bagayoko 6

Yaoundé

=== Semifinals ===
2 October 2015
19:00

Boxscore

Cameroon	71–70	Nigeria
Scoring by quarter: 15–23, 21–13, 13–15, 22–19
Pts: Lonlack 20; Rebs: Njonkou 16; Asts: Blackshear, Mbiandja 3		Pts: Elonu 17; Rebs: Madu 9 Asts: Elonu 7

Yaoundé

2 October 2015
21:15

Boxscore

Angola	54–56	Senegal
Scoring by quarter: 15–19, 9–16, 10–10, 20–11
Pts: Manuel 19; Rebs: Manuel 10; Asts: Francisco 4		Pts: As. Traoré 17; Rebs: Sy 8 Asts: three players 4

Yaoundé

=== Eleventh place match ===
2 October 2015
11:00

Boxscore

Algeria	87–49	South Africa
Scoring by quarter: 19-14, 15-15, 28-7, 25-13
Pts: Boussaid 20; Rebs: Taïbi 7 Asts: Mahsas 6		Pts: Ngobeni 11; Rebs: Bosega 7 Asts: Bosega 5

Yaoundé

=== Ninth place match ===
2 October 2015
13:15

Boxscore

Uganda	52–53	Guinea
Scoring by quarter: 16–12, 10–13, 13–9, 13–19
Pts: Peace 18; Rebs: Peace 21; Asts: Nakazibwe 4		Pts: M. Touré 14; Rebs: Bah 7 Asts: Bah 4

Yaoundé

=== Seventh place match ===
3 October 2015
11:00

Boxscore

Egypt	67–71	Gabon
Scoring by quarter: 21–12, 16–14, 9–20, 21–25
Pts: El-Gedawy 16; Rebs: El-Gedawy 10; Asts: Deghady 7		Pts: Robert 29; Rebs: Robert 15; Asts: Mbaikoua, Robert 5

Yaoundé

=== Fifth place match ===
3 October 2015
13:15

Boxscore

Mozambique	68–69	Mali
Scoring by quarter: 11–18, 21–8, 20–25, 16–18
Pts: Ngulela 20; Rebs: Mafanela 6 Asts: Ngulela 9		Pts: N. Coulibaly 17; Rebs: N. Coulibaly 13; Asts: Bagayoko 3

Yaoundé

=== Bronze medal match ===
3 October 2015
15:30

Boxscore

Nigeria	65–55	Angola
Scoring by quarter: 14–11, 17–20, 14–24, 20–0
Pts: Ekworomadu 15; Rebs: Elonu, Madu 8 Asts: three players 2		Pts: Guadalupe 13; Rebs: Gonçalves 9 Asts: Eusébio 6

Yaoundé

=== Final ===
3 October 2015
18:00

Boxscore

Cameroon	66–81	Senegal
Scoring by quarter: 17–20, 14–20, 19–17, 16–24
Pts: Lonlack 14; Rebs: Njonkou 8 Asts: Mbiandja 6		Pts: As. Traoré 17; Rebs: Diarra 11; Asts: Dieng 5

Yaoundé

== Final standings ==
Qualified for the Olympics
Qualified for the Final Qualifying Tournaments

#	Team	W–L
1st place, gold medalist(s)	Senegal	6–2
2nd place, silver medalist(s)	Cameroon	7–1
3rd place, bronze medalist(s)	Nigeria	6–2
4	Angola	5–3
5	Mali	6–2
6	Mozambique	4–4
7	Gabon	3–5
8	Egypt	3–5
9	Guinea	3–4
10	Uganda	2–5
11	Algeria	1–6
12	South Africa	0–7

== Awards ==
2015 African champions

Senegal
Eleventh title

- Most Valuable Player: (Senegal) Aya Traoré
- All-Star Team:
  - PG – (Mozambique) Deolinda Ngulela
  - SG – (Senegal) Aya Traoré
  - SF – (Cameroon) Ramses Lonlack
  - PF – (Gabon) Geraldine Robert
  - C – (Nigeria) Adaora Elonu

== Statistical leaders ==
Points

Name	PPG
(Gabon) Geraldine Robert	20.4
(Mozambique) Deolinda Ngulela	16.4
(Gabon) Grace Mbaikoua	16.0
(Cameroon) Ramses Lonlack	15.5
(Algeria) Lina Mahsas	15.3

Rebounds

Name	RPG
(Uganda) Proscovia Peace	12.7
(Gabon) Geraldine Robert	12.5
(Nigeria) Ndidi Madu	9.5
(Mali) Naignouma Coulibaly	9.1
(Uganda) Muhayimina Namuwaya	9.0

Assists

Name	APG
(Mozambique) Deolinda Ngulela	4.9
(Gabon) Geraldine Robert	4.6
(Senegal) Fatou Dieng	4.4
(Nigeria) Sarah Ogoke	4.0
(Cameroon) Priscilla Udeaja	3.9

Blocks

Name	BPG
(Angola) Nadir Manuel	1.9
(South Africa) Sophy Ngobeni	1.7
(Senegal) Maimouna Diarra	1.4
(Cameroon) Béatrice Bofia	1.1
(Gabon) Geraldine Robert	1.1
(Senegal) Oumou Touré	1.1

Steals

Name	SPG
(Mozambique) Ingvild Mucauro	4.1
(Gabon) Geraldine Robert	3.9
(Guinea) Mariama Touré	2.8
(Cameroon) Ramses Lonlack	2.5
(Gabon) Grace Mbaikoua	2.5
