= Basketball at the 2015 African Games – Women's tournament =

Basketball at the 2015 African Games women's tournament
Tournament details
- Host country: Republic of the Congo
- Dates: September 9–18, 2015
- Teams: 10 (from 10 federations)
- Venue(s): 1 (in Brazzaville host cities)

Final positions
- Champions: Mali (1st title)

Official website
- African Games: Tournament for Men 2015

The 2015 edition of the women's basketball tournament of the African Games was the 11th, organized by FIBA Africa and played under the auspices of FIBA, the basketball sport governing body. The tournament was held from 9 to 18 September 2015 at the Gymnase Makélékélé in Brazzaville, Republic of Congo, contested by 10 national teams and won by Mali.

== Format ==
- The 10 teams were divided into two groups (Groups A+B) for the preliminary round.
- Round robin for the preliminary round; the top two teams of each group advanced to the quarterfinals.
- From there on a knockout system was used until the final.

== Draw ==
| Group A | Group B |
|---|---|
| Cameroon; Congo; Mali; Mozambique; Nigeria | Algeria; Angola; Gabon; Ivory Coast; Senegal |

== Group stage ==
Times given below are in UTC+1.

=== Group A ===
| Qualified for the quarter-finals |

| Team | Pld | W | L | PF | PA | PD | Pts |
|---|---|---|---|---|---|---|---|
| Nigeria | 4 | 4 | 0 | 327 | 218 | +109 | 8 |
| Mali | 4 | 3 | 1 | 313 | 196 | +117 | 7 |
| Cameroon | 4 | 2 | 2 | 276 | 219 | +57 | 6 |
| Mozambique | 4 | 1 | 3 | 291 | 235 | +56 | 5 |
| Congo | 4 | 0 | 4 | 102 | 441 | -339 | 4 |

9 September 2015
12:00

Boxscore

| Congo | 28–98 | Cameroon |
Scoring by quarter: 15-23, 5-22, 3-26, 5-27
| Pts: Bakoueth 13; Rebs: Mongo 7 Asts: Kandolo 1 | | Pts: Lonlack 24; Rebs: Jamen 9 Asts: three players 2 |

Gymnase Makélékélé, Brazzaville
Referees: Hamid Kaddour (ALG), Annie Muchenu (ZIM), Domingos Manuel (ANG)

14:00

Boxscore

| Mali | 70–48 | Mozambique |
Scoring by quarter: 19-13, 15-14, 23-13, 13-8
| Pts: Traoré 12; Rebs: N.Coulibaly 7 Asts: four players 1 | | Pts: Gimo 8 Rebs: Mucauro, Chambe 4 Asts: two players 2 |

Gymnase Makélékélé, Brazzaville
Referees: Clésio Ramos (ANG), Aissatou Diagne (SEN), Hassan Kamate (CIV)

10 September 2015
10:00

Boxscore

| Cameroon | 60–49 | Mozambique |
Scoring by quarter: 25-21, 12-9, 11-11, 12-8
| Pts: Astride Njogap 15; Rebs: Mbiandja 8 Asts: Mbiandja 1 | | Pts: Ngulela 13; Rebs: Chambe 6 Asts: Ngulela 2 |

Gymnase Makélékélé, Brazzaville
Referees: Hassan Kamate (CIV), Hamid Kaddour (ALG), Aissatou Diagne (SEN)

16:30

Boxscore

| Nigeria | 70–69 | Mali |
Scoring by quarter: 19-21, 13-14, 21-7, 17-27
| Pts: Ogoke 20; Rebs: Udeaja 7 Asts: Udeaja 2 | | Pts: Tirera 19; Rebs: N.Coulibaly 11; Asts: four players 1 |

Gymnase Makélékélé, Brazzaville
Referees: Paterne N'Ziengui (GAB), Sammy Wakaba (KEN), Didier Gaga (RWA)

12 September 2015
12:00

Boxscore

| Congo | 24–109 | Mali |
Scoring by quarter: 5-34, 3-29, 10-26, 6-20
| Pts: Kandolo 6 Rebs: Ikounga 4 Asts: 0 | | Pts: Traoré 23; Rebs: Traoré, N.Coulibaly 5 Asts: N'Diaye 4 |

Gymnase Makélékélé, Brazzaville
Referees: Aissatou Diagne (SEN), Renato Bindy (CAF), Dorothy Okatch (BOT)

16:00

Boxscore

| Mozambique | 62–78 | Nigeria |
Scoring by quarter: 17-20, 20-21, 14-15, 11-22
| Pts: Ngulela 17; Rebs: Chambe 10; Asts: Chambe 2 | | Pts: Ekworomadu 15; Rebs: Sanni 9 Asts: Ekworomadu 5 |

Gymnase Makélékélé, Brazzaville
Referees: Annie Muchenu (ZIM), Ambrose Mbalu (KEN), Sandra Essia (GAB)

13 September 2015
12:00

Boxscore

| Mozambique | 132–27 | Congo |
Scoring by quarter: 37-4, 35-6, 39-8, 21-9
| Pts: Ngulela, Mucauro 19; Rebs: Mafanela 8 Asts: Ngulela 8 | | Pts: Ndandou 8 Rebs: Mongo 9 Asts: Bakoueth 2 |

Gymnase Makélékélé, Brazzaville
Referees: Toussaint Niamien (CIV), Renato Bindy (CAF), Aissatou Diagne (SEN)

September 2015
18:00

Boxscore

| Cameroon | 64–77 | Nigeria |
Scoring by quarter: 10-19, 13-22, 21-16, 20-20
| Pts: Njogap 18; Rebs: Ade 6 Asts: Mbiandja 4 | | Pts: Elonu, Udeaja 16; Rebs: Elonu 7 Asts: Ogoke, Ogunjimi 3 |

Gymnase Makélékélé, Brazzaville
Referees: Banza Tonton (COD), Annie Muchenu (ZIM), Hesham Metwaly (EGY)

14 September 2015
12:00

Boxscore

| Nigeria | 102–23 | Congo |
Scoring by quarter: 31-14, 19-6, 29-3, 23-0
| Pts: Ekworomadu, Elonu 18; Rebs: Udeaja 8 Asts: Ogunjimi 5 | | Pts: Eyongo 9 Rebs: Mpolo 6 Asts: Kandolo, Ikounga 1 |

Gymnase Makélékélé, Brazzaville
Referees: Youssouf Maiga (MLI), Dorothy Okatch (BOT), Renato Bindy (CAF)

14:00

Boxscore

| Mali | 65–54 | Cameroon |
Scoring by quarter: 21-16, 23-10, 9-16, 12-12
| Pts: N'Diaye 12; Rebs: Diakite 9 Asts: Tireira 3 | | Pts: Jamen 10; Rebs: Mbiandja 10; Asts: Ayangma 3 |

Gymnase Makélékélé, Brazzaville
Referees: Sammy Wakaba (KEN), Hamid Kaddour (ALG), Annie Muchenu (ZIM)

=== Group B ===
| Qualified for the quarter-finals |

| Team | Pld | W | L | PF | PA | PD | Pts |
|---|---|---|---|---|---|---|---|
| Senegal | 4 | 4 | 0 | 307 | 194 | +113 | 8 |
| Angola | 4 | 3 | 1 | 222 | 209 | +13 | 7 |
| Ivory Coast | 4 | 2 | 2 | 242 | 237 | +5 | 6 |
| Gabon | 4 | 1 | 3 | 205 | 271 | -66 | 5 |
| Algeria | 4 | 0 | 4 | 225 | 290 | -65 | 4 |

9 September 2015
10:00

Boxscore

| Algeria | 51–61 | Angola |
Scoring by quarter: 9-6, 14-22, 14-18, 14-15
| Pts: Boushaki 15; Rebs: Boushaki, Isli 4 Asts: 0 | | Pts: Ana 14; Rebs: Isabel 5 Asts: 0 |

Gymnase Makélékélé, Brazzaville
Referees: Armand Okoua (CGO), Guy Sani (CMR), Dorothy Okatch (BOT)

September 2015
16:00

Boxscore

| Senegal | 87–26 | Gabon |
Scoring by quarter: 20-3, 21-11, 21-3, 25-9
| Pts: Touré 18; Rebs: Touré 9 Asts: four players 1 | | Pts: Pamba 11; Rebs: Folake 6 Asts: 0 |

Gymnase Makélékélé, Brazzaville
Referees: Sélio Chiau (MOZ), Olayinka Famogbiyele (NGR), Bob Ossouala (CGO)

10 September 2015
12:00

Boxscore

| Ivory Coast | 72–56 | Algeria |
Scoring by quarter: 22-9, 14-17, 14-13, 22-17
| Pts: Cisse 19; Rebs: Djedjemel 7 Asts: fofana 4 | | Pts: Mahsas 25; Rebs: Mahsas, Regani 5 Asts: Isli, Boudjerima 2 |

Gymnase Makélékélé, Brazzaville
Referees: Ambrose Mbalu (KEN), Hesham Metwaly (EGY), Dorothy Okatch (BOT)

18:30

Boxscore

| Gabon | 47–60 | Angola |
Scoring by quarter: 20-15, 10-15, 4-12, 13-18
| Pts: Robert 14; Rebs: Robert 5 Asts: Robert, Ngoua 1 | | Pts: Felizarda 14; Rebs: Luísa 6 Asts: Felizarda, Isabel 3 |

Gymnase Makélékélé, Brazzaville
Referees: Muwezhi Munatamba (ZAM), Toussaint Niamien (CIV), Olusegun Adekanmbi (NGR)

11 September 2015
14:00

Boxscore

| Angola | 49–48 | Ivory Coast |
Scoring by quarter: 6-12, 19-7, 15-16, 9-13
| Pts: Ngiendula 9 Rebs: Nacissela, Fineza 7 Asts: Felizarda 4 | | Pts: Cisse 13; Rebs: fofana 8 Asts: four players 2 |

Gymnase Makélékélé, Brazzaville
Referees: Sammy Wakaba (KEN), Sassi Camara (MLI), Dorothy Okatch (BOT)

20:00

Boxscore

| Senegal | 88–61 | Algeria |
Scoring by quarter: 32-20, 23-11, 15-15, 18-15
| Pts: Dieng 15; Rebs: Ay.Traoré 6 Asts: Thiam 4 | | Pts: Mahsas 16; Rebs: chenaf 6 Asts: Isli 3 |

Gymnase Makélékélé, Brazzaville
Referees: Annie Muchenu (ZIM), Toussaint Niamien (CIV), Olusegun Adekanmbi (NGR)

13 September 2015
10:00

Boxscore

| Gabon | 63–67 | Ivory Coast |
Scoring by quarter: 15-17, 15-23, 12-11, 21-16
| Pts: Robert 24; Rebs: Robert 10; Asts: Robert 4 | | Pts: Cisse 15; Rebs: fofana 7 Asts: Berté 5 |

Gymnase Makélékélé, Brazzaville
Referees: Ambrose Mbalu (KEN), Dorothy Okatch (BOT), Olayinka Famogbiyele (NGR)

14:00

Boxscore

| Angola | 52–63 | Senegal |
Scoring by quarter: 15-17, 13-8, 13-19, 11-19
| Pts: three players 8 Rebs: Nadir 6 Asts: Fineza 3 | | Pts: Ay.Traoré 19; Rebs: Ay.Traoré 10; Asts: Marie Sy 3 |

Gymnase Makélékélé, Brazzaville
Referees: Sassi Camara (MLI), Didier Gaga (RWA), Sandra Essia (GAB)

14 September 2015
10:00

Boxscore

| Algeria | 57–69 | Gabon |
Scoring by quarter: 18-16, 5-23, 13-11, 21-19
| Pts: Mahsas 12; Rebs: Regani 11; Asts: Boushaki, Isli 2 | | Pts: Mbaikoua 21; Rebs: Robert 24; Asts: Robert 4 |

Gymnase Makélékélé, Brazzaville
Referees: Abreu Muhimua (MOZ), Aissatou Diagne (SEN), Olusegun Adekanmbi (NGR)

18:00

Boxscore

| Ivory Coast | 55–69 | Senegal |
Scoring by quarter: 21-17, 10-15, 20-20, 4-17
| Pts: Cisse, Kouyate 13; Rebs: K.Traoré 7 Asts: Kouyate, Berté 3 | | Pts: Sene 12; Rebs: Marie Sy 6 Asts: Marie Sy, Dieng 3 |

Gymnase Makélékélé, Brazzaville
Referees: Guy Sani (CMR), Sélio Chiau (MOZ), Sandra Essia (GAB)

== Knockout stage ==
All matches were played at the: Gymnase Makélékélé, in Brazzaville

=== 9th place match ===
15 September 2015
10:00

Boxscore

| Congo | 42–64 | Algeria |
Scoring by quarter: 4-21, 10-18, 14-11, 14-14
| Pts: Kandolo 23; Rebs: Mongo 11; Asts: Kandolo, Ikounga 2 | | Pts: Tlemsani 18; Rebs: Isli, Taibi 6 Asts: Refes 4 |

Gymnase Makélékélé, Brazzaville
Referees: Sassi Camara (MLI), Renato Bindy (CAF), Olusegun Adekanmbi (NGR)

=== Quarterfinals ===
Quarter-finals
15 September 2015
Gabon | 65
Nigeria | 73
15 September 2015
Cameroon | 51
Angola | 58
15 September 2015
Ivory Coast | 45
Mali | 73
15 September 2015
Mozambique | 46
Senegal | 65

Semi-finals
17 September 2015
Nigeria | 61
Angola | 59
17 September 2015
Senegal | 62
Mali | 70

Final
18 September 2015
Nigeria | 57
Mali | 73
Third place
18 September 2015
Angola | 53
Senegal | 42

Semi-finals
16 September 2015 - 14:00
Gabon | 46
Cameroon | 54
16 September 2015 - 16:00
Mozambique | 90
Ivory Coast | 56

5th place
15 September 2015 - 14:00
Cameroon | 70
Mozambique | 69
7th place
17 September 2015 - 12:00
Gabon | 44
Ivory Coast | 56

15 September 2015
14:00

Boxscore

| Gabon | 65–73 | Nigeria |
Scoring by quarter: 19-20, 15-15, 16-18, 15-20
| Pts: Robert 25; Rebs: Mbaikoua, Folake 4 Asts: Robert, Mbaikoua 3 | | Pts: Elonu 22; Rebs: Udeaja 10; Asts: Elonu, Ogoke 3 |

Gymnase Makélékélé, Brazzaville
Referees: Guy Sani (CMR), Didier Gaga (RWA), Aissatou Diagne (SEN)

16:00

Boxscore

| Cameroon | 51–58 | Angola |
Scoring by quarter: 15-10, 12-17, 9-17, 15-14
| Pts: Njogap 15; Rebs: Lonlack 7 Asts: Lonlack 2 | | Pts: Ngiendula 14; Rebs: Ngiendula, Luísa 6 Asts: Nadir 2 |

Gymnase Makélékélé, Brazzaville
Referees: Hamid Kaddour (ALG), Sélio Chiau (MOZ), Sandra Essia (GAB)

18:00

Boxscore

| Ivory Coast | 45–73 | Mali |
Scoring by quarter: 9-15, 11-21, 7-15, 18-22
| Pts: fofana 9 Rebs: fofana, Berté 4 Asts: Kone 2 | | Pts: Diakite 11; Rebs: Diakite 11; Asts: Tirera 2 |

Gymnase Makélékélé, Brazzaville
Referees: Domingos Manuel (ANG), Ambrose Mbalu (KEN), Dorothy Okatch (BOT)

20:00

Boxscore

| Mozambique | 46–65 | Senegal |
Scoring by quarter: 15-20, 14-15, 8-11, 9-19
| Pts: Ngulela 13; Rebs: Chambe 8 Asts: Ngulela 4 | | Pts: Marie Sy 16; Rebs: Marie Sy 11; Asts: Diouf 7 |

Gymnase Makélékélé, Brazzaville
Referees: Bob Ossouala (CGO), Annie Muchenu (ZIM), Toussaint Niamien (CIV)

=== 5–8th place ===
16 September 2015
14:00

Boxscore

| Gabon | 46–54 | Cameroon |
Scoring by quarter: 16-8, 3-26, 19-9, 8-11
| Pts: Robert 15; Rebs: Robert 12; Asts: Robert, Folake 2 | | Pts: Jamen 17; Rebs: Ade 10; Asts: Lonlack, Ayangma 2 |

Gymnase Makélékélé, Brazzaville
Referees: Armand Okoua (CGO), Annie Muchenu (ZIM), Aissatou Diagne (SEN)

16:00

Boxscore

| Mozambique | 90–56 | Ivory Coast |
Scoring by quarter: 21-13, 24-8, 21-22, 24-13
| Pts: Chambe 18; Rebs: Chambe, Mafanela 9 Asts: Mafanela 6 | | Pts: Kouyate 21; Rebs: fofana 8 Asts: Kouyate 3 |

Gymnase Makélékélé, Brazzaville
Referees: Renato Bindy (CAF), Dorothy Okatch (BOT), Sandra Essia (GAB)

=== 7th place match ===
17 September 2015
12:00

Boxscore

| Gabon | 44–56 | Ivory Coast |
Scoring by quarter: 12-20, 14-12, 11-16, 7-8
| Pts: Robert 18; Rebs: Robert 8 Asts: five players 1 | | Pts: fofana 16; Rebs: fofana 14; Asts: Kouyate, Camara 4 |

Gymnase Makélékélé, Brazzaville
Referees: Bob Ossouala (CGO), Hamid Kaddour (ALG), Dorothy Okatch (BOT)

=== 5th place match ===
15 September 2015
14:00

Boxscore

| Cameroon | 70–69 | Mozambique |
Scoring by quarter: 17-12, 15-22, 17-15, 21-20
| Pts: Jamen 33; Rebs: Jamen 9 Asts: Mbiandja 4 | | Pts: Mucauro 22; Rebs: Mafanela 14; Asts: Ngulela 4 |

Gymnase Makélékélé, Brazzaville
Referees: Didier Gaga (RWA), Olusegun Adekanmbi (NGR), Sandra Essia (GAB)

=== Semifinals ===
17 September 2015
16:00

Boxscore

| Nigeria | 61–59 | Angola |
Scoring by quarter: 22-20, 12-16, 10-13, 17-10
| Pts: three players 14; Rebs: Udeaja, Sanni 7 Asts: Ekworomadu 3 | | Pts: Fineza 17; Rebs: Fineza, Rosa 8 Asts: Nacissela 3 |

Gymnase Makélékélé, Brazzaville
Referees: Sassi Camara (MLI), Toussaint Niamien (CIV), Aissatou Diagne (SEN)

September 2015
18:00

Boxscore

| Senegal | 62–70 | Mali |
Scoring by quarter: 11-20, 20-19, 14-19, 17-12
| Pts: Marie Sy 16; Rebs: Diarra 6 Asts: three players 2 | | Pts: N.Coulibaly 18; Rebs: N.Coulibaly, K.Coulibaly 7 Asts: Gandega 7 |

Gymnase Makélékélé, Brazzaville
Referees: Domingos Manuel (ANG), Guy Sani (CMR), Annie Muchenu (ZIM)

=== Bronze medal match ===
18 September 2015
12:00

Boxscore

| Angola | 53–42 | Senegal |
Scoring by quarter: 18-10, 16-9, 14-8, 5-15
| Pts: Nadir, Ngiendula 10; Rebs: Ana 6 Asts: Fineza 4 | | Pts: Touré 15; Rebs: Diatta 7 Asts: Sene 3 |

Gymnase Makélékélé, Brazzaville
Referees: Ambrose Mbalu (KEN), Sélio Chiau (MOZ), Dorothy Okatch (BOT)

=== Gold medal match ===
18 September 2015
16:00

Boxscore

| Nigeria | 57–73 | Mali |
Scoring by quarter: 10-17, 16-13, 17-21, 14-22
| Pts: Elonu 15; Rebs: Elonu 10; Asts: Ekworomadu 3 | | Pts: N.Coulibaly 21; Rebs: N.Coulibaly 16; Asts: Tirera 4 |

Gymnase Makélékélé, Brazzaville
Referees: Annie Muchenu (ZIM), Aissatou Diagne (SEN), Sandra Essia (GAB)

== Final standings ==
| Rank | Team | Record |
|---|---|---|
| Gold medal | Mali | 6-1 |
| Silver medal | Nigeria | 6-1 |
| Bronze medal | Angola | 5-2 |
| 4 | Senegal | 5-2 |
| 5 | Cameroon | 4-3 |
| 6 | Mozambique | 2-5 |
| 7 | Ivory Coast | 3-4 |
| 8 | Gabon | 1-6 |
| 9 | Algeria | 1-4 |
| 10 | Congo | 0-5 |

== Awards ==
2015 African Games Women's Basketball winner

Mali
First title

== See also ==
AfroBasket Women 2015
