= Senegal at the 2015 African Games =

Senegal at the 2015 All-Africa Games
- IOC code: SEN
- NOC: Comité National Olympique et Sportif Sénégalais

in Brazzaville
- Competitors: 287 in 20 sports
- Medals Ranked 10th: Gold 3 Silver 4 Bronze 10 Total 17

All-Africa Games appearances (overview)
- 1965; 1973; 1978; 1987; 1991; 1995; 1999; 2003; 2007; 2011; 2015; 2019; 2023

Senegal, participated at the 2015 African Games held in the city of Brazzaville, Republic of the Congo. It participated with 287 athletes in 20 sports.

== Basketball ==
=== Women ===
==== Group B ====
| Qualified for the quarter-finals |

| Team | Pld | W | L | PF | PA | PD | Pts |
|---|---|---|---|---|---|---|---|
| Senegal | 4 | 4 | 0 | 307 | 194 | +113 | 8 |
| Angola | 4 | 3 | 1 | 222 | 209 | +13 | 7 |
| Ivory Coast | 4 | 2 | 2 | 242 | 237 | +5 | 6 |
| Gabon | 4 | 1 | 3 | 205 | 271 | -66 | 5 |
| Algeria | 4 | 0 | 4 | 225 | 290 | -65 | 4 |

September 2015
16:00

Boxscore

| Senegal | 87–26 | Gabon |
Scoring by quarter: 20-3, 21-11, 21-3, 25-9
| Pts: Touré 18; Rebs: Touré 9 Asts: four players 1 | | Pts: Pamba 11; Rebs: Folake 6 Asts: 0 |

Gymnase Makélékélé, Brazzaville
Referees: Sélio Chiau (MOZ), Olayinka Famogbiyele (NGR), Bob Ossouala (CGO)

20:00

Boxscore

| Senegal | 88–61 | Algeria |
Scoring by quarter: 32-20, 23-11, 15-15, 18-15
| Pts: Dieng 15; Rebs: Ay.Traoré 6 Asts: Thiam 4 | | Pts: Mahsas 16; Rebs: chenaf 6 Asts: Isli 3 |

Gymnase Makélékélé, Brazzaville
Referees: Annie Muchenu (ZIM), Toussaint Niamien (CIV), Olusegun Adekanmbi (NGR)

14:00

Boxscore

| Angola | 52–63 | Senegal |
Scoring by quarter: 15-17, 13-8, 13-19, 11-19
| Pts: three players 8 Rebs: Nadir 6 Asts: Fineza 3 | | Pts: Ay.Traoré 19; Rebs: Ay.Traoré 10; Asts: Marie Sy 3 |

Gymnase Makélékélé, Brazzaville
Referees: Sassi Camara (MLI), Didier Gaga (RWA), Sandra Essia (GAB)

18:00

Boxscore

| Ivory Coast | 55–69 | Senegal |
Scoring by quarter: 21-17, 10-15, 20-20, 4-17
| Pts: Cisse, Kouyate 13; Rebs: K.Traoré 7 Asts: Kouyate, Berté 3 | | Pts: Sene 12; Rebs: Marie Sy 6 Asts: Marie Sy, Dieng 3 |

Gymnase Makélékélé, Brazzaville
Referees: Guy Sani (CMR), Sélio Chiau (MOZ), Sandra Essia (GAB)

== Knockout stage ==
All matches were played at the: Gymnase Makélékélé, in Brazzaville

=== Quarter-finals ===
20:00

Boxscore

| Mozambique | 46–65 | Senegal |
Scoring by quarter: 15-20, 14-15, 8-11, 9-19
| Pts: Ngulela 13; Rebs: Chambe 8 Asts: Ngulela 4 | | Pts: Marie Sy 16; Rebs: Marie Sy 11; Asts: Diouf 7 |

Gymnase Makélékélé, Brazzaville
Referees: Bob Ossouala (CGO), Annie Muchenu (ZIM), Toussaint Niamien (CIV)

=== Semifinals ===
September 2015
18:00

Boxscore

| Senegal | 62–70 | Mali |
Scoring by quarter: 11-20, 20-19, 14-19, 17-12
| Pts: Marie Sy 16; Rebs: Diarra 6 Asts: three players 2 | | Pts: N.Coulibaly 18; Rebs: N.Coulibaly, K.Coulibaly 7 Asts: Gandega 7 |

Gymnase Makélékélé, Brazzaville
Referees: Domingos Manuel (ANG), Guy Sani (CMR), Annie Muchenu (ZIM)

=== Bronze medal match ===
18 September 2015
12:00

Boxscore

| Angola | 53–42 | Senegal |
Scoring by quarter: 18-10, 16-9, 14-8, 5-15
| Pts: Nadir, Ngiendula 10; Rebs: Ana 6 Asts: Fineza 4 | | Pts: Touré 15; Rebs: Diatta 7 Asts: Sene 3 |

Gymnase Makélékélé, Brazzaville
Referees: Ambrose Mbalu (KEN), Sélio Chiau (MOZ), Dorothy Okatch (BOT)

== Football ==
=== Squad ===
| No. | Pos. | Player | Date of birth (age) | Club |
|---|---|---|---|---|
| 1 | GK | Pape Seydou Ndiaye | 11 February 1993 (aged 22) | |
| 2 | MF | Ousseynou Thioune | 16 November 1993 (aged 21) | |
| 3 | MF | Nestor Mendy | 26 February 1995 (aged 20) | |
| 4 | DF | Ibrahima Diedhiou | 13 October 1994 (aged 20) | |
| 5 | DF | Daouda Diop | 10 January 1993 (aged 22) | |
| 6 | DF | Arial Benabent Mendy | 7 November 1994 (aged 20) | |
| 7 | MF | Sylvain Badji | 28 June 1994 (aged 21) | |
| 8 | FW | Samba Ndiaye | 12 January 1994 (aged 21) | |
| 9 | FW | Ibrahima Keita | 16 June 1994 (aged 21) | |
| 10 | MF | Abdoulaye Ba | 12 October 1993 (aged 21) | |
| 11 | FW | Dominique Mendy | 10 January 1994 (aged 21) | |
| 12 | MF | Roger Gomis | 20 March 1995 (aged 20) | |
| 13 | MF | Boubacar Cissokho | 6 December 1994 (aged 20) | |
| 14 | DF | Adama Mbengue | 1 December 1993 (aged 21) | |
| 15 | DF | Elhadji Pape Djibril Diaw | 31 December 1994 (aged 20) | |
| 16 | GK | Pape Abdoulaye Dieng | 10 November 1994 (aged 20) | |
| 17 | MF | Mouhamed Gueye | 5 December 1993 (aged 21) | |
| 18 | FW | Moussa Seydi | 21 August 1996 (aged 19) | |
| 19 | DF | Moussa Wague | 4 October 1998 (aged 16) | |
| 20 | FW | Cheikhou Dieng | 23 November 1993 (aged 21) | |

=== Men ===
==== Group B ====
| Pos | Team | Pld | W | D | L | GF | GA | GD | Pts | Qualification |
|---|---|---|---|---|---|---|---|---|---|---|
| 1 | Nigeria | 2 | 1 | 1 | 0 | 3 | 1 | +2 | 4 | Knockout stage |
| 2 | Senegal | 2 | 0 | 2 | 0 | 1 | 1 | 0 | 2 | Knockout stage |
| 3 | Ghana | 2 | 0 | 1 | 1 | 0 | 2 | −2 | 1 | |
| 4 | Egypt | 0 | 0 | 0 | 0 | 0 | 0 | 0 | 0 | Withdrew |

Source: CAF
6 September 2015
14:00

| Ghana | 0–0 | Senegal |
|---|---|---|
| | Report |

Stade Alphonse Massemba-Débat, Brazzaville
Referee: Lazard Tsiba (Congo)

9 September 2015
14:00

| Senegal | Cancelled | Egypt |
|---|---|---|
| | Report |

Stade Alphonse Massemba-Débat, Brazzaville

12 September 2015
14:00

| Senegal | 1–1 | Nigeria |
|---|---|---|
| Keita 82' | Report | Abdullahi 90' |

Stade Municipal de Kintélé, Brazzaville
Referee: Mahmoud Ashor (Egypt)

=== Semifinals ===
15 September 2015
15:00

| Congo | 1–3 | Senegal |
|---|---|---|
| Ndockyt 54' | Report | Dieng 16'; Keita 36', 82' |

Stade Alphonse Massemba-Débat, Brazzaville
Referee: Pacifique Ndabihawenimana (Burundi)

=== Gold medal match ===
18 September 2015
18:30

| Senegal | 1–0 | Burkina Faso |
|---|---|---|
| Seydi 2' | Report |

Stade Alphonse Massemba-Débat, Brazzaville
Referee: Aurélien Juenkou (Cameroon)

== Tennis ==
Senegal entered two tennis players into the African Games.

Men

| Athlete | Event | Round of 64 | Round of 32 | Round of 16 | Quarterfinals | Semifinals | Final / BM | |
| Athlete | Event | Opposition Score | Opposition Score | Opposition Score | Opposition Score | Opposition Score | Opposition Score | Rank |
|---|---|---|---|---|---|---|---|---|
| Yannick Languina | Men's singles | H-G Lhebath (CGO); W 6–3, 6–3 | K Cheruiyot (KEN); L 4–6, 2–6 | did not advance | | | | |
| Omar Kâ | Men's singles | P Ogombe (GAB); W 6–0, 6–3 | C Paul (NGR); L 3–6, 2–6 | did not advance | | | | |
| Omar Kâ; Yannick Languina | Men's doubles | — | W Lebendje / DV Lossangoye (GAB); W 6–3 6–7^{(2–7)}, [10–8] | AS Ahmed / M Sereche (ETH); W w/o | M Michael / C Paul (NGR); W 6–3 6–3 | D Indondo / S Nkulufa (COD); L 3–6 2–6 | Did not advance | 3rd place, bronze medalist(s) |

== Volleyball ==
=== Women ===
==== Group A ====
| Pos | Team | Pld | W | L | Pts | SW | SL | SR | SPW | SPL | SPR | Qualification |
|---|---|---|---|---|---|---|---|---|---|---|---|---|
| 1 | Egypt | 5 | 5 | 0 | 15 | 15 | 0 | MAX | 382 | 245 | 1.559 | Semifinals |
| 2 | Seychelles | 5 | 4 | 1 | 11 | 12 | 7 | 1.714 | 440 | 365 | 1.205 | Semifinals |
| 3 | Botswana | 5 | 3 | 2 | 7 | 10 | 8 | 1.250 | 414 | 399 | 1.038 | |
| 4 | Senegal | 5 | 2 | 3 | 7 | 10 | 10 | 1.000 | 420 | 429 | 0.979 | |
| 5 | Ghana | 5 | 1 | 4 | 3 | 5 | 12 | 0.417 | 345 | 396 | 0.871 | |
| 6 | Congo | 5 | 0 | 5 | 0 | 0 | 15 | 0.000 | 208 | 375 | 0.555 | |

| Date | | Score | | Set 1 | Set 2 | Set 3 | Set 4 | Set 5 | Total |
|---|---|---|---|---|---|---|---|---|---|
| 3 Sep | Senegal | 2–3 | Seychelles | 17–25 | 19–25 | 25–23 | 25–22 | 16–18 | 102–113 |
| 5 Sep | Senegal | 3–1 | Ghana | 25–16 | 18–25 | 25–21 | 25–23 | | 93–85 |
| 7 Sep | Egypt | 3–0 | Senegal | 25–15 | 25–16 | 25–16 | | | 75–46 |
| 9 Sep | Senegal | 2–3 | Botswana | 17–25 | 25–20 | 21–25 | 25–23 | 15–17 | 103–110 |
| 11 Sep | Senegal | 3–0 | Congo | 25–19 | 25–13 | 25–14 | | | 75–46 |
