= FIBA Women's AfroBasket All-Tournament Team =

The AfroBasket Women All-Tournament Team is a FIBA award given every two years, awarded to the five strongest competitors throughout the tournament.

== Honourees ==
Year	Player	Position	Team	Ref.
2007	Carla da Silva	Guard	Mozambique	
2007	Aya Traoré	Forward	Senegal	
2007	Hamchétou Maïga	Forward	Mali	
2007	Crispina Correia	Center	Cape Verde	
2007	Diéné Diawara	Center	Mali	
2009	Fatou Dieng	Guard	Senegal	
2009	Aya Traoré (2)	Forward	Senegal	
2009	Nacissela Maurício	Forward	Angola	
2009	Naîgnouma Coulibaly	Center	Mali	
2009	Aminata Nar Diop	Center	Senegal	
2011	Mame Diodio Diouf	Guard	Senegal	
2011	Aya Traoré (3)	Forward	Senegal	
2011	Nacissela Maurício (2)	Forward	Angola	
2011	Sónia Ndoniema	Forward	Angola	
2011	Djénébou Sissoko	Center	Mali	
2013	Deolinda Ngulela	Guard	Mozambique	
2013	Ramses Lonlack	Guard	Cameroon	
2013	Leia Dongue	Forward	Mozambique	
2013	Astou Traoré	Forward	Senegal	
2013	Nacissela Maurício (3)	Forward	Angola	
2015	Deolinda Ngulela (2)	Guard	Mozambique	
2015	Ramses Lonlack (2)	Guard	Cameroon	
2015	Aya Traoré (4)	Forward	Senegal	
2015	Geraldine Robert	Forward	Gabon	
2015	Adaora Elonu	Forward	Nigeria	
2017	Italee Lucas	Guard	Angola	
2017	Leia Dongue (2)	Forward	Mozambique	
2017	Astou Traoré (2)	Forward	Senegal	
2017	Evelyn Akhator	Forward	Nigeria	
2017	Naîgnouma Coulibaly (2)	Center	Mali	
2019	Touty Gandega	Guard	Mali	
2019	Ezinne Kalu	Guard	Nigeria	
2019	Leia Dongue (3)	Forward	Mozambique	
2019	Astou Traoré (3)	Forward	Senegal	
2019	Evelyn Akhator (2)	Forward	Nigeria	
2021	Ezinne Kalu (2)	Guard	Nigeria	
2021	Marina Ewodo	Forward	Cameroon	
2021	Adaora Elonu (2)	Forward	Nigeria	
2021	Yacine Diop	Forward	Senegal	
2021	Mariam Coulibaly	Center	Mali	
2023	Cierra Dillard	Guard	Senegal	
2023	Jannon Jaye Otto	Guard	Uganda	
2023	Amy Okonkwo	Forward	Nigeria	
2023	Sika Koné	Forward	Mali	
2023	Tamara Seda	Forward	Mozambique	
2025	Cierra Dillard	Guard	Senegal	
2025	Delicia Washington	Guard	South Sudan	
2025	Amy Okonkwo	Forward	Nigeria	
2025	Jane Asinde	Forward	Uganda	
2025	Sika Koné	Forward	Mali	

== See also ==
- FIBA AfroBasket Women Most Valuable Player
- FIBA Women's Basketball World Cup Most Valuable Player
- FIBA Women's Basketball World Cup All-Tournament Team
- FIBA Awards
