= Elo Edeferioka =

Nigerian basketball player

No. 12 – CB Vigo
- Position: Center
- League: LFB

Personal information
- Born: 10 April 1993 (age 33) Warri, Nigeria
- Listed height: 1.91 m (6 ft 3 in)
- Listed weight: 90 kg (198 lb)

Career information
- High school: Life Center Academy (Burlington County, New Jersey)
- College: Hofstra (2013–15); Georgia Tech (2015–18)
- WNBA draft: 2018: undrafted

Elo Edema Edeferioka (born 10 April 1993) is a Nigerian basketball player for Celta de Vigo Baloncesto and the Nigerian national team.

She participated at the 2018 FIBA Women's Basketball World Cup.

== Hofstra statistics ==
Legend
GP	Games played	GS	Games started	MPG	Minutes per game
FG%	Field goal percentage	3P%	3-point field goal percentage	FT%	Free throw percentage
RPG	Rebounds per game	APG	Assists per game	SPG	Steals per game
BPG	Blocks per game	PPG	Points per game	**Bold**	Career high

Year	Team	GP	Points	FG%	3P%	FT%	RPG	APG	SPG	BPG	PPG
2013-14	Hofstra	29	182	44.1%	0.0%	63.5%	7.4	0.9	0.3	0.9	6.3
2014-15	Hofstra	33	**302**	**47.4%**	0.0%	62.0%	**8.7**	1.0	0.5	**1.0**	**9.2**
2015-16	Georgia Tech	**Sat due to NCAA transfer rules**									
2016-17	Georgia Tech	**37**	246	42.8%	**50.0%**	70.1%	6.0	0.5	0.6	0.9	6.6
2017-18	Georgia Tech	30	230	46.7%	**50.0%**	**73.8%**	6.5	**1.0**	**0.6**	0.5	7.7
Career		129	960	45.4%	50.0%	66.7%	7.1	0.8	0.5	0.8	7.4
