= Chineze Nwagbo =

Nigerian-American basketball player

Personal information
- Born: November 28, 1982 (age 43) Iowa City, Iowa, U.S.
Medals
Women's basketball
Representing Nigeria
African Games
Silver medal – second place	2015 Brazzaville	Team
AfroBasket
Gold medal – first place	2017 Mali

Chineze Uzoamaka Nwagbo (born November 28, 1982, in Iowa City) is a Nigerian-American who played on Syracuse University’s women's basketball team from 2000 - 2005, and played professional basketball internationally for a 11 years worldwide. Her most recent role was serving as the Director of Player Programs and Engagement with the National Football League Players Association.

== Early life and education ==
Chineze was born in Iowa City, Iowa to the family of Samuel and Cordelia Nwagbo. She studied Biology at Syracuse University obtaining her Bachelor of Science degree, and later pursued an 11-year International Professional Basketball career in sports after her graduation.
