= Muhayimina Namuwaya =

Ugandan netball player (born 1988)

Personal information
- Born: January 1, 1988 (age 37) Luwero, Uganda
- Occupation: netball player
- Height: 1.80 m (5 ft 11 in)

Netball career
- Playing position: goal keeper

Muhayimina Namuwaya (born 1 January 1988) is an Ugandan netball player who represents Uganda internationally and plays in the position of goal keeper. She has represented Uganda at the 2018 Commonwealth Games and at the 2019 Netball World Cup.
