= Flavia Oketcho =

Ugandan basketball player

Personal information
- Born: 16 July 1986 (age 38); Kampala, Uganda
- Education: Kitante Hill Secondary School; Makerere College School; Uganda Christian University
- Height: 170 cm 5 ft 7 in

Sport
- Country: Uganda
- Sport: Basketball
- Team: Uganda women's national basketball team Gazelles

Flavia Oketcho (born 16 July 1986) is a Ugandan female basketball player, who plays for Uganda women's national basketball team.

== Background and education ==
She was born in the Central Region of Uganda on 16 July 1986 and grew up there.

In 1992, Oketcho joined Nakasero Primary School but later changed to Kitante Primary School, where she studied from 1993 to 1998.

In 1999–2002, she attended Kitante Hill Secondary School for O' level education. in 2001, while at Kitante Hill, she played her first league match with the Lady Bucks. In 2003–2004, she joined Makerere College School for her S5 but later joined Najja High School where she sat her A'level exams.

Oketcho attended Uganda Christian University in 2007 for a degree in Mass Communications. In 2008 she helped the UCU basketball team, the Lady Cannons, to win the league title and was awarded the MVP.

== Career and awards ==
She played her first league match in 2001 with the Lady Bucks. In 2004 she was voted MVP in the East Africa Club Championship, which she helped to win two league titles.

in 2005, she represented Uganda in the Zone V Nations Tournament.
