= Fatma Aly =

Egyptian basketball player (born 1997)

Personal information
- Born: 3 February 1997 (age 29) Alexandria, Egypt
- Listed height: 6 ft 7 in (2.01 m)

Career information
- NBA draft: 2019: undrafted
- Position: Center

Fatma Aly (born February 3, 1997, in Alexandria) is an Egyptian basketball player who is playing center for Al Ittihad and Egypt women's national basketball team.

== Career history ==
Fatma Aly first represented Egypt in 2013 when she was called to the national youth team to play FIBA U16 women's African Championship. She was part of the national youth team that plays 2014 FIBA U17 women's African championship, 2014 Afrobasket U18 women and 2015 FIBA U19 women's world championship. She was again called to the senior national team in 2015 during 2015 women's Afrobasket, 2019 FIBA women's Afrobasket, 2023 FIBA women's Afrobasket-Qualifiers and 2023 women's Afrobasket.
