= Vilma Covane =

American-Mozambican basketball player

No. 42 – University of the Cumberlands Patriots
- Position: Center

Personal information
- Born: October 10, 1996 (age 30) Maputo, Mozambique
- Listed height: 6 ft 3 in (1.91 m)

Career information
- College: University of the Cumberlands
- NBA draft: 2021(undrafted): undrafted

Vilma Palmira Afonso Covane (born October 10, 1996) is a Mozambican basketball player. She plays for her college team, University of the Cumberlands Patriots, and also the Mozambique women's national basketball team.

== High school ==
Covane played under Lionel Manhique in Mozambique. She averaged 16 points, 11 rebounds and 2 assists per game.

== College ==
In Seward County Community College Covane averaged 8.3 points per game, 4.5 rebounds and 1.1 assists. In her sophomore year she attended Jones County Junior College and only spent a season there. And later moved to the University of The Cumberlands. In her junior year, she played in 26 games, starting in 16 and averaged 12.5 points per game and 7.2 rebounds per game. As a senior Covane played in 19 games, while starting 14 and recorded 207 points, 102 rebounds, 19 steals, team-high 15 blocks, and six assists.

== National Team Career ==
Covane participated in the 2011 Afrobasket U16 Championship for Women and averaged 4 points, 0 rebounds, 0 assists. And also the 2014 Afrobasket U18 Women, she averaged 6.6 points, 10.9 rebounds, and 0.3 assist. She recently participated in the 2021 FIBA Women's Afrobasket where she averaged 2.2 points, 2 rebounds and 0.3 assists.
