= Shahnez Boushaki =

Shahnez Boushaki ( Arabic : شاهيناز بوسحاقي ; born 22 October 1985 in Algiers ) is an Algerian basketball player .

== Career ==
Boushaki has played for GS Pétroliers since 2002. She began her professional career in 2010 with GS Pétroliers in the Algerian Women's Cup . She won the 2015 Algerian Cup, beating rivals OC Alger 73–55 in the final

She participated with the GS Pétroliers in several Arab competitions including:

- 2013 FIBA Africa Championship for Women in Egypt,
- 2016 Arab Women's 3x3 Club Championship in Sharjah

as well as several African club competitions including:

- 2016 African Cup of Champions in Mozambique
- 2017 African Cup of Champions Clubs in Angola

Boushaki has been a member of the Algerian national basketball team since 2010. She has participated in various continental competitions:

- 2013 FIBA Africa Championship for Women in Mozambique
- AfroBasket Women 2015 in Cameroon
- 2011 African Games in Mozambique
- 2015 African Games in the Republic of Congo.
