= Ndidi Madu =

American-born Nigerian basketball player

No. 12 – Broni
- Position: Forward
- League: Serie A1

Personal information
- Born: March 17, 1989 (age 37) Nashville, Tennessee, U.S.
- Listed height: 6 ft 2 in (1.88 m)

Career information
- College: Florida
Medals
Women's basketball
Representing Nigeria
African Games
Silver medal – second place	2015 Brazzaville	Team
AfroBasket
Gold medal – first place	2017 Mali

Ndidi Madu (born March 17, 1989) is an American-born Nigerian basketball player who last played basketball for Broni and the Nigerian national team.

== Florida statistics ==
Legend
GP	Games played	GS	Games started	MPG	Minutes per game
FG%	Field goal percentage	3P%	3-point field goal percentage	FT%	Free throw percentage
RPG	Rebounds per game	APG	Assists per game	SPG	Steals per game
BPG	Blocks per game	PPG	Points per game	**Bold**	Career high

Year	Team	GP	Points	FG%	3P%	FT%	RPG	APG	SPG	BPG	PPG
2007-08	Florida	1	3	50.0%	0.0%	50.0%	3.0	-	-	-	3.0
2008-09	Florida	26	62	**51.0%**	0.0%	50.0%	1.8	0.3	0.3	0.3	2.4
2009-10	Florida	32	121	35.0%	0.0%	59.5%	2.9	0.5	0.5	0.3	3.8
2010-11	Florida	**35**	**251**	45.4%	0.0%	**76.7%**	**5.0**	0.5	0.5	**0.4**	**7.2**
2011-12	Florida	33	165	39.7%	**28.0%**	61.5%	4.3	**1.2**	**0.6**	0.3	5.0
Career		127	481	41.9%	28.0%	62.5%	3.6	0.6	0.5	0.3	3.8

== International career ==
She participated at the 2017 Women's Afrobasket. she averaged 3.9 pts, 3.9 RBG and 1.6 APG during the tournament.

=== FIBA stats ===
During the FIBA Africa championship for women in 2013, she averaged 9.3 points per game. During the 2014 FIBA Africa cup for women's club final round, she averaged 10pts, 3.3RPG, 0.8APG. During the 2015 Afrobasket for women; final round she averaged 8.1pts, 9.5 RPG and 0.6 APG. In the 2015 FIBA champions cup for women, she averaged 9pts, 5.8RPG, 1.1APG. During the 2016 FIBA women's Olympic qualifying tournament, she averaged 7pts, 6.5RPG, 1APG. At the 2017 Afrobasket for women she averaged 3.9pts, 3.9 RPG and 1.4 APG. She also averaged 7.2pts, 7RPG and 1.6 APG at the 2017 FIBA champions cup for women in which she played for interclube of Angola.

== Retirement ==
On June 25, 2018, Madu announced her retirement via social media from Professional basketball ahead of the 2018 FIBA Women's World cup in Spain. She stated her retirement will help her focus on her life after Basketball which is Coaching and her foundation the Team Madu Foundation which centers on youth development.
