= Ramata Diakité (basketball) =

Malian basketball player (born 1991)

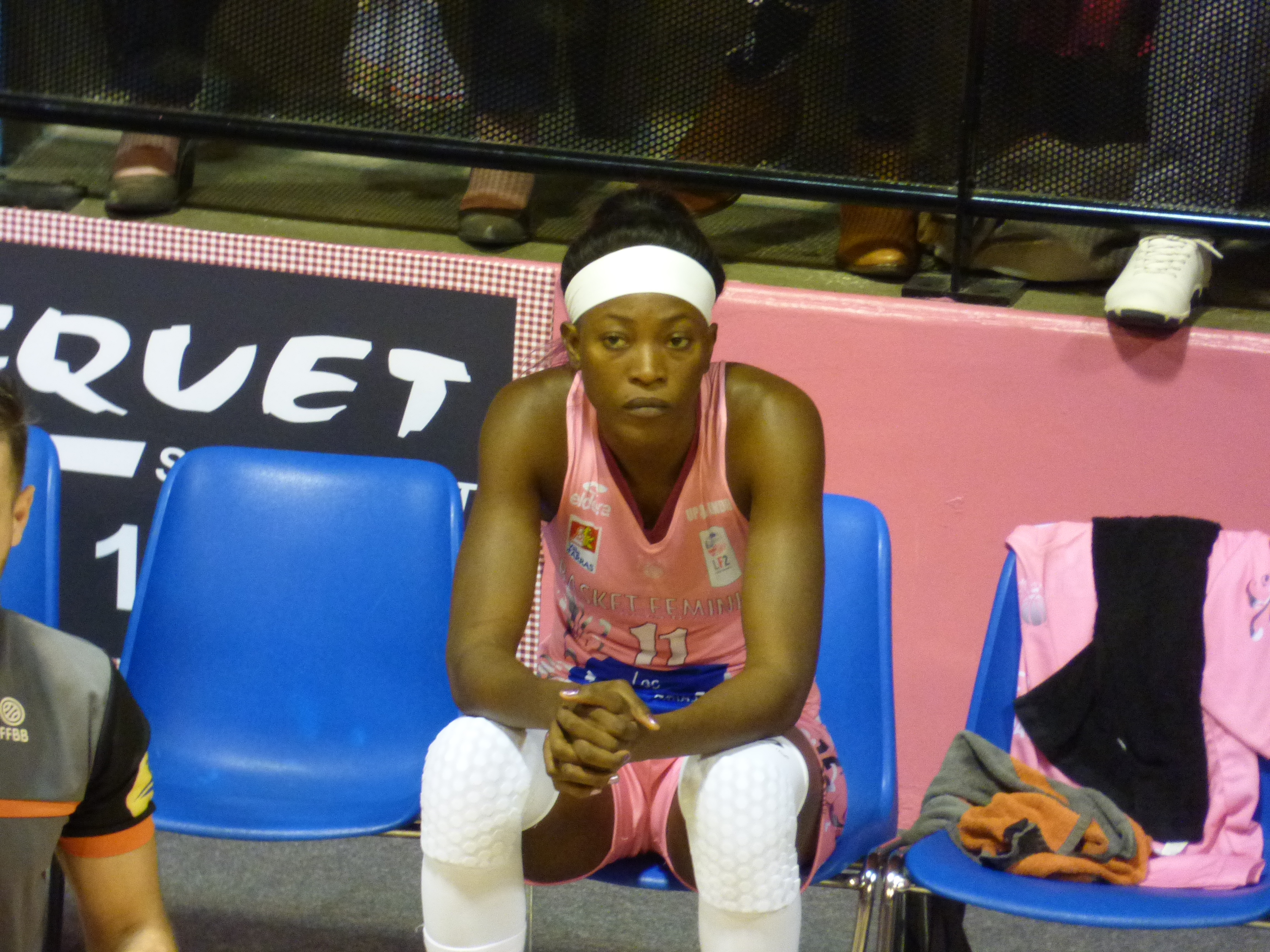

No. 11 – ASPTT Arras
- Position: Power forward
- League: LFB

Personal information
- Born: 17 September 1991 (age 35) Kati, Mali
- Listed height: 6 ft 2 in (1.88 m)
Medals
Women's basketball
Representing Mali
African Games
Gold medal – first place	2015 Brazzaville	Team
AfroBasket
Bronze medal – third place	2017 Mali

Ramata Diakité (born 17 September 1991) is a Malian basketball player for ASPTT Arras and the Malian national team.

She participated at the 2017 Women's Afrobasket.
