= Olayinka Sanni =

Nigerian-American basketball player (born 1986)

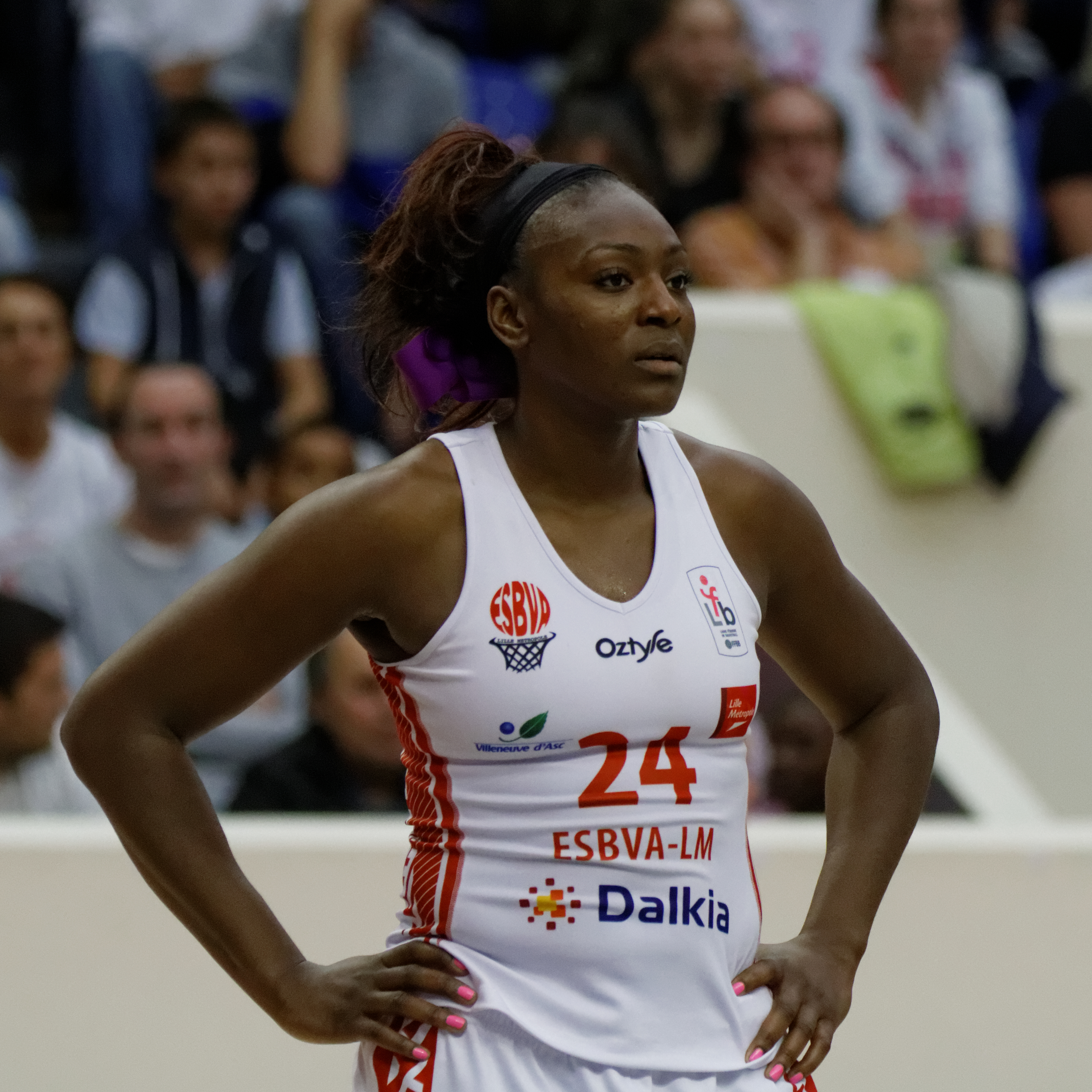

Personal information
- Born: August 21, 1986 (age 40) Chicago Heights, Illinois, U.S.
- Listed height: 6 ft 2 in (1.88 m)
- Listed weight: 200 lb (91 kg)

Career information
- High school: Homewood-Flossmoor (Flossmoor, Illinois)
- College: West Virginia (2004–2008)
- WNBA draft: 2008: 2nd round, 18th overall pick
- Drafted by: Detroit Shock
- Playing career: 2008–present
- Position: Center

Career history
- 2008–2009: Detroit Shock
- 2011: Phoenix Mercury

Career highlights
- WNBA Champion (2008); 2× First-team All-Big East (2007, 2008)
- Stats at WNBA.com
- Stats at Basketball Reference
Medals
Women's basketball
Representing Nigeria
African Games (All-Africa Games)
Silver medal – second place	2015 Brazzaville	Team
Silver medal – second place	2007 Algiers	Team
Bronze medal – third place	2011 Maputo	Team

Olayinka Ajike Sanni (born August 21, 1986) is a Nigerian-American professional basketball player. Born in Chicago Heights, Illinois, she most recently played the center / power forward position for the Phoenix Mercury in the WNBA and also for Charleville-Méz in France – LFB.

== College career ==
In her senior year at West Virginia, Sanni averaged career highs in points per game (16.2) and rebounds per game (7.1).

== WNBA career ==
Sanni was drafted 18th overall in the 2008 WNBA draft by the Detroit Shock. Out of the 31 games she played in her rookie season, she started 9. She shot exactly 50% from the floor (41–82) while averaging just a little over 10 minutes per game.

She is playing for Calais in France during the 2008–09 WNBA off-season.

She is currently playing for ESB Villeneuve-d'Ascq in France during the 2009–10 WNBA off-season.

== Career statistics ==
Legend
GP	Games played	GS	Games started	MPG	Minutes per game
FG%	Field goal percentage	3P%	3-point field goal percentage	FT%	Free throw percentage
RPG	Rebounds per game	APG	Assists per game	SPG	Steals per game
BPG	Blocks per game	PPG	Points per game	**Bold**	Career high

=== College ===
Legend
GP	Games played	GS	Games started	MPG	Minutes per game
FG%	Field goal percentage	3P%	3-point field goal percentage	FT%	Free throw percentage
RPG	Rebounds per game	APG	Assists per game	SPG	Steals per game
BPG	Blocks per game	PPG	Points per game	**Bold**	Career high

Year	Team	GP	Points	FG%	3P%	FT%	RPG	APG	SPG	BPG	PPG
2004–05	West Virginia	**33**	236	46.8	–	51.8	4.9	0.4	0.9	0.6	7.2
2005–06	West Virginia	31	384	58.3	–	50.8	5.3	0.5	1.2	0.6	12.4
2006–07	West Virginia	32	449	55.3	–	**65.0**	6.7	0.5	**1.7**	**0.9**	14.0
2007–08	West Virginia	**33**	**533**	**58.8**	–	58.5	**7.1**	**1.0**	1.5	0.4	**16.2**
Career	West Virginia	129	1602	55.7	–	57.4	6.0	0.6	1.3	0.6	12.4

=== WNBA ===
==== Regular season ====
Year	Team	GP	GS	MPG	FG%	3P%	FT%	RPG	APG	SPG	BPG	TO	PPG
2008	Detroit	**31**	**9**	**10.5**	.500	.000	.649	**2.1**	0.2	0.4	**0.2**	1.3	3.4
2009	Detroit	**31**	1	9.6	.480	.000	**.694**	1.8	**0.5**	**0.4**	**0.2**	1.0	**3.8**
2011	Phoenix	14	0	5.2	**.667**	.000	.333	0.7	0.0	0.2	0.1	**0.9**	1.6
Career		76	10	9.2	.503	.000	.646	1.7	0.3	0.3	0.2	1.1	3.3

==== Playoffs ====
Year	Team	GP	GS	MPG	FG%	3P%	FT%	RPG	APG	SPG	BPG	TO	PPG
2008	Detroit	**9**	0	**7.3**	.438	–	**.500**	**1.8**	**0.3**	**0.3**	0.0	0.4	1.8
2009	Detroit	3	0	4.3	**.625**	–	–	1.0	0.0	0.0	**1.0**	**0.0**	**3.3**
Career		12	0	6.6	.500	–	.500	1.6	0.3	0.3	0.3	0.3	2.3

== Philanthropy ==
Olayinka Sanni oversees the Olayinka Sanni Foundation, a not-for-profit that caters to the development of boys and girls through leadership and basketball camps. In 2017, she hosted a basketball camp for teenage boys and girls in Lagos, Nigeria.
