= Oumoul Thiam =

Senegalese basketball player

No. 15 – CB Islas Canarias
- Position: Guard
- League: LFB

Personal information
- Born: 3 February 1990 (age 36) Galoya, Senegal
- Listed height: 5 ft 10 in (1.78 m)
- Listed weight: 150 lb (68 kg)

Career information
- College: Southern Nazarene (2012)
- WNBA draft: 2012: undrafted

Oumoul Khairy Thiam (born 3 February 1990) is a Senegalese basketball player. She represented Senegal in the basketball competition at the 2016 Summer Olympics.
