= Astou Traoré =

Senegalese basketball player

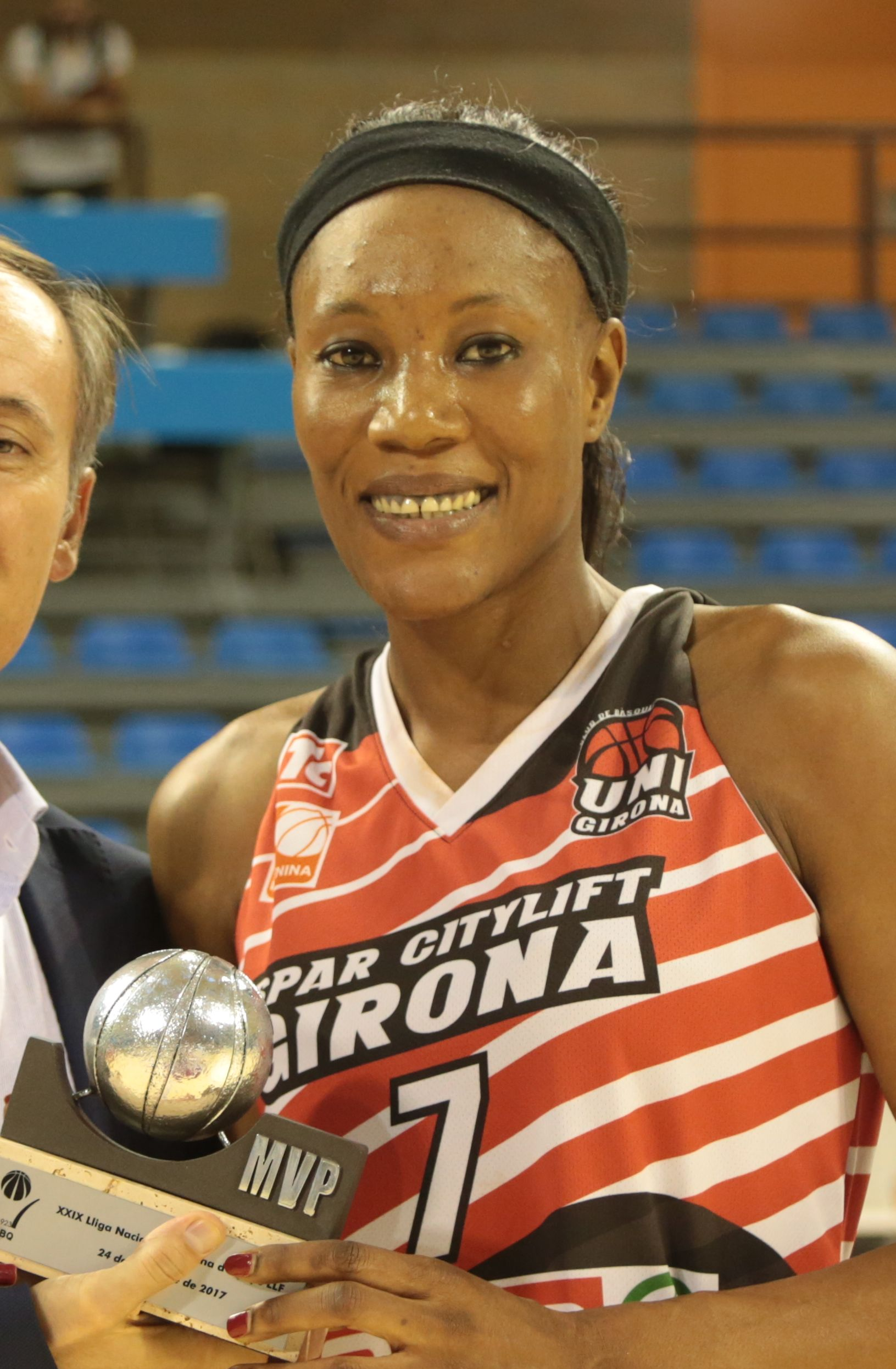

No. 10 – Uni Girona CB
- Position: Forward
- League: LFB

Personal information
- Born: 30 April 1981 (age 45) M'Bour, Senegal
- Listed height: 1.82 m (6 ft 0 in)
- Listed weight: 75 kg (165 lb)

Career information
- WNBA draft: 2003: undrafted

Astou Traoré (born 30 April 1981) is a Senegalese women's basketball player. She is also a regular on the Senegalese women's national basketball team. She signed for Spanish team Uni Girona CB. She played previously with Rivas Futura of the Spanish Liga Femenina de Baloncesto.

She competed for Senegal at the 2016 Summer Olympics.
