= Sarah Ogoke =

Nigerian-American basketball player

No. 8 – Ferroviário de Maputo
- Position: Shooting guard
- League: FIBAACCW

Personal information
- Born: 25 June 1990 (age 36) The Bronx, New York, U.S.
- Listed height: 1.75 m (5 ft 9 in)

Career information
- College: Southern Polytechnic State (2014)
- WNBA draft: 2014: undrafted
Medals
Women's basketball
Representing Nigeria
AfroBasket
Gold medal – first place	2017 Mali
Gold medal – first place	2019 Senegal
Gold medal – first place	2021 Cameroon
Gold medal – first place	2023 Rwanda
Gold medal – first place	2025 Ivory Coast
African Games (All-Africa Games)
Silver medal – second place	2015 Brazzaville	Team
Bronze medal – third place	2011 Maputo	Team

Sarah Ogoke (born 25 June 1990) is a Nigerian-American basketball player for Ferroviário de Maputo and the Nigerian national team.

She participated at the 2017 Women's Afrobasket and 2019 Women's Afrobasket. Ogoke was also a member of Nigeria's female basketball team, D'tigress, at the 2018 FIBA Women's Basketball World Cup in Tenerife, Canary Islands, Spain.

== Personal life ==
Ogoke was born in New York to Nigerian parents, Bentley Ogoke and Edith Ogure-Ogoke. She obtained her Bachelor of Science degree in Biology/Premedicine from the Southern Polytechnic State University, Georgia.

== College career statistics ==
Legend
GP	Games played	GS	Games started	MPG	Minutes per game	RPG	Rebounds per game
APG	Assists per game	SPG	Steals per game	BPG	Blocks per game	PPG	Points per game
TO	Turnovers per game	FG%	Field-goal percentage	3P%	3-point field-goal percentage	FT%	Free-throw percentage
**Bold**	Career best	°	League leader

=== College ===
Year	Team	GP	GS	MPG	FG%	3P%	FT%	RPG	APG	SPG	BPG	TO	PPG
2008–09	Pittsburgh	22	-	-	**33.3**	**30.0**	**60.0**	0.6	0.4	0.2	0.0	**0.4**	**1.4**
2009–10	Pittsburgh	**28**	2	9.7	22.0	12.5	33.3	**1.4**	**0.8**	**0.4**	0.0	1.2	1.0
**Career**		50	2	8.2	26.5	19.2	47.4	1.0	0.6	0.3	0.0	0.8	1.2
Statistics retrieved from Sports-Reference.
