= Ramses Lonlack =

Cameroonian basketball player

Ramses Lonlack (born 20 January 1989) is a Cameroonian women's basketball guard. She has played internationally with the Cameroon women's national basketball team and at the collegiate level with the Memphis Tigers women's basketball team in Tennessee, United States.

Lonlack was born in Belabo, Cameroon and is a native of Bertoua. She moved to the United States in 2006 at the age of 17. Lonlack was a star player while attending Stoneleigh-Burnham School in Massachusetts, USA. During her senior season (2011-12) at Memphis, Lonlack was named the Conference USA Defensive Player of the Year. She was also named to the C-USA All-Defensive Team following her sophomore and junior seasons.

== Memphis statistics ==
Legend
GP	Games played	GS	Games started	MPG	Minutes per game
FG%	Field goal percentage	3P%	3-point field goal percentage	FT%	Free throw percentage
RPG	Rebounds per game	APG	Assists per game	SPG	Steals per game
BPG	Blocks per game	PPG	Points per game	**Bold**	Career high

Year	Team	GP	Points	FG%	3P%	FT%	RPG	APG	SPG	BPG	PPG
2008-09	Memphis	30	263	36.8%	19.4%	70.0%	**5.4**	1.8	2.2	0.0	8.8
2009-10	Memphis	**34**	287	39.4%	0.0%	**70.5%**	5.0	1.1	**2.8**	0.1	8.4
2010-11	Memphis	**34**	**327**	38.0%	18.8%	62.0%	4.7	1.6	2.3	0.0	**9.6**
2011-12	Memphis	31	289	**42.1%**	**31.6%**	62.2%	4.8	**2.5**	2.0	**0.3**	9.3
Career		129	1166	39.0%	20.0%	65.9%	4.9	1.7	2.3	0.1	9.0
