= Geraldine Robert =

Gabonese-French basketball player

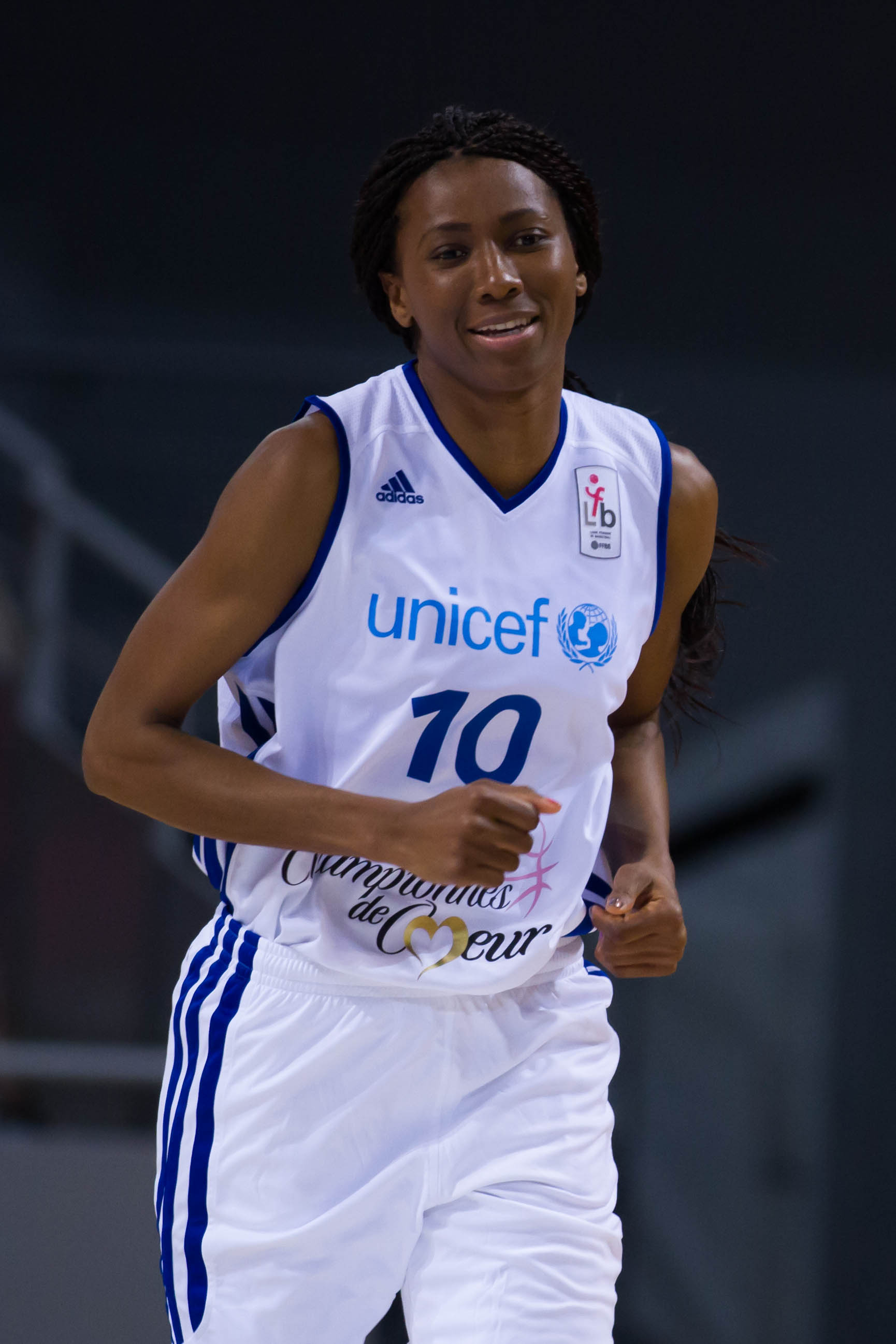
- Geraldine Robert

Personal information
- Born: 26 June 1980 (age 46) Port-Gentil, Gabon
- Listed height: 1.84 m (6 ft 0 in)

Career information
- Playing career: 1998–present
- Position: Small forward

Career history
- 1998–1999: Besançon Basket Comté Doubs
- 2003–2004: London Sting
- 2004–2005: Rhondda Rebels
- 2005–2006: Strasbourg Alsace Basket Club
- 2006–2009: ESB Villeneuve-d'Ascq
- 2009–2010: Club Atletico Faenza Pallacanestro
- 2010–2011: PF Umbertide
- 2011–2012: Lotos VBW Clima Gdynia
- 2012–2014: Basket Lattes
- 2014–: ESB Villeneuve-d'Ascq

Geraldine Robert (born 26 June 1980) is a Gabonese-French female professional basketball player.
