= Maimouna Diarra =

Senegalese basketball player

No. 11 – Club Deportivo Promete
- Position: Center
- League: La Liga Feminina

Personal information
- Born: 30 January 1991 (age 35) Saint-Louis, Senegal
- Listed height: 1.98 m (6 ft 6 in)
- Listed weight: 90 kg (198 lb)

Career information
- WNBA draft: 2013: undrafted
- Playing career: 2015–present

Career history
- 2015–2016: Primeiro d'Agosto
- 2017: Los Angeles Sparks
- 2018: Ciudad de Los Adelantados
- Stats at Basketball Reference
Medals
Women's basketball
Representing Senegal
AfroBasket
Gold medal – first place	2015 Cameroon
Silver medal – second place	2019 Senegal
Bronze medal – third place	2013 Mozambique
African Games
Bronze medal – third place	2015 Brazzaville	Team

Maimouna Diarra (born 30 January 1991) is a Senegalese basketball player for Club Deportivo Promete of La Liga Feminina.

She represented Senegal in the basketball competition at the 2016 Summer Olympics.

Diarra played one season in the WNBA for the 2017 Los Angeles Sparks, becoming the second Senegalese player in the league, after Astou Ndiaye-Diatta. Los Angeles waived her prior to the following year's training camp.

== Career statistics ==
Legend
GP	Games played	GS	Games started	MPG	Minutes per game	RPG	Rebounds per game
APG	Assists per game	SPG	Steals per game	BPG	Blocks per game	PPG	Points per game
TO	Turnovers per game	FG%	Field-goal percentage	3P%	3-point field-goal percentage	FT%	Free-throw percentage
**Bold**	Career best	°	League leader

=== WNBA ===
WNBA regular season statistics
Year	Team	GP	GS	MPG	FG%	3P%	FT%	RPG	APG	SPG	BPG	TO	PPG
2017	Los Angeles	10	0	2.0	.200	—	.500	1.1	0.1	0.2	0.0	0.3	0.3
**Career**	1 year, 1 team	10	0	2.0	.200	—	.500	1.1	0.1	0.2	0.0	0.3	0.3
