= Oumou Touré =

Senegalese basketball player

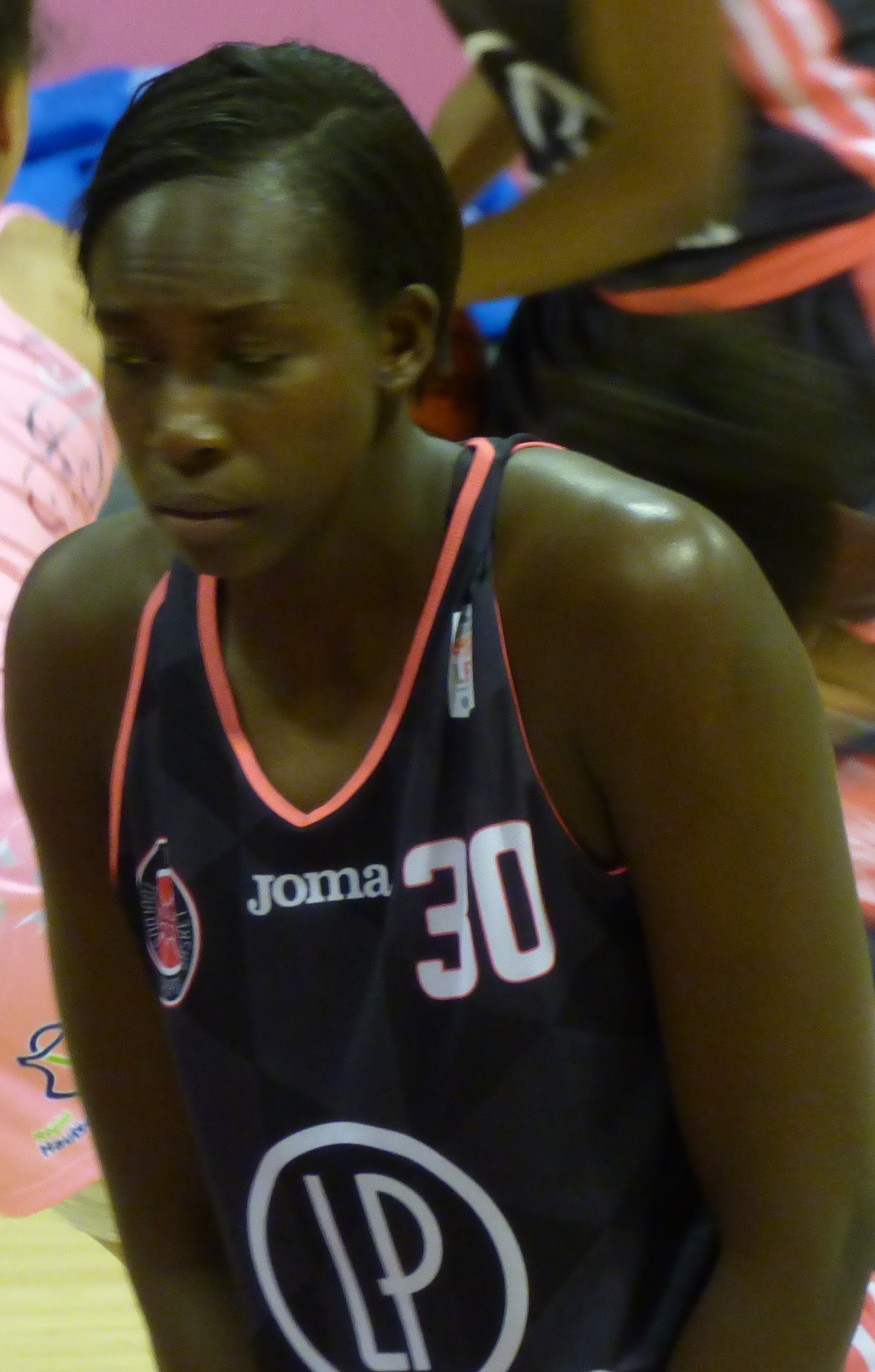

Personal information
- Born: February 18, 1988 (age 38)
- Listed height: 6 ft 2 in (1.88 m)

Career information
- Playing career: 2006–present
- Position: Center

Career history
- 2006–2007: Charnay-Lès-Mâcon
- 2007–2008: Beaune
- 2008–2009: Chalon-sur-Saône BC
- 2009–2011: Basket Catalan Perpignan
- 2011–2013: Léon Trégor Basket 29
- 2013–2014: USO Mondeville
- 2014–2015: Saint-Amand Hainaut Basket
- 2015–2016: Landerneau Bretagne Basket
- 2016–2018: Toulouse Métropole Basket
- 2018: Club Santa Maria Machala
- 2018–2019: BC Saint Paul Reze
- 2019: Elitzur Ramla
- 2019–2020: Roche Vendée Basket Club
- 2020–2021: Zagłębie Sosnowiec
- 2021: ESB Villeneuve-d'Ascq
- 2021: Elazığ İl Özel İdarespor

Oumou Kalsoum Touré (born February 18, 1988) is a Senegalese basketball player. She represented Senegal in the basketball competition at the 2016 Summer Olympics.
