= Gabon women's national basketball team =

Gabon
- FIBA ranking: 116 ▼2 (9 February 2025)
- Joined FIBA: 1965
- FIBA zone: FIBA Africa
- National federation: Fédération Gabonaise de Basket-Ball
- Coach: Servais Allogho

AfroBasket
- Appearances: 2
Home	Away

Gabon women's national basketball team is the nationally basketball team representing Gabon at world basketball competitions for women.

== History ==
The Gabonese played in July 2021 in Kinshasa a pivotal match against the DR Congo national team at the 2021 Women's Afrobasket qualification under head coach Raymond Lasseny.

At that time, the Gabonese had always beaten the RDC.

== Afrobasket record ==
- 2005 – 9th
- 2015 – 7th

== See also ==
- Gabon women's national under-16 basketball team
