= Ana Gonçalves =

Angolan basketball player (born 1993)

No. 14 – Primeiro de Agosto
- Position: Power forward
- League: Angolan League; Africa Club Champions Cup

Personal information
- Born: 3 January 1993 (age 33) Benguela, Angola
- Listed height: 183 cm (6 ft 0 in)
- Listed weight: 79 kg (174 lb)

Career history
- 2012: Interclube Benguela
- 2012–present: Primeiro de Agosto

Ana Cláudia da Costa Gonçalves (born 3 January 1993) is an Angolan basketball player. At the 2012 Summer Olympics, she competed for the Angola women's national basketball team in the women's event. She is 6 ft 0 inches tall.
