= Kankou Coulibaly =

Malian basketball player (born 1990)

No. 10 – Universitario Dakar
- Position: Forward
- League: SWBL

Personal information
- Born: 11 April 1990 (age 36) Bamako, Mali
- Listed height: 6 ft 2 in (1.88 m)
Medals
Women's basketball
Representing Mali
African Games
Gold medal – first place	2015 Brazzaville	Team
AfroBasket
Silver medal – second place	2021 Cameroon
Bronze medal – third place	2017 Mali
Bronze medal – third place	2023 Rwanda

Kankou Coulibaly (born 11 April 1990) is a Malian basketball player for Universitario Dakar and the Malian national team.

She participated at the 2017 Women's Afrobasket. and 2022 FIBA Women's Basketball World Cup.
