= Mame-Marie Sy =

Senegalese basketball player (born 1985)

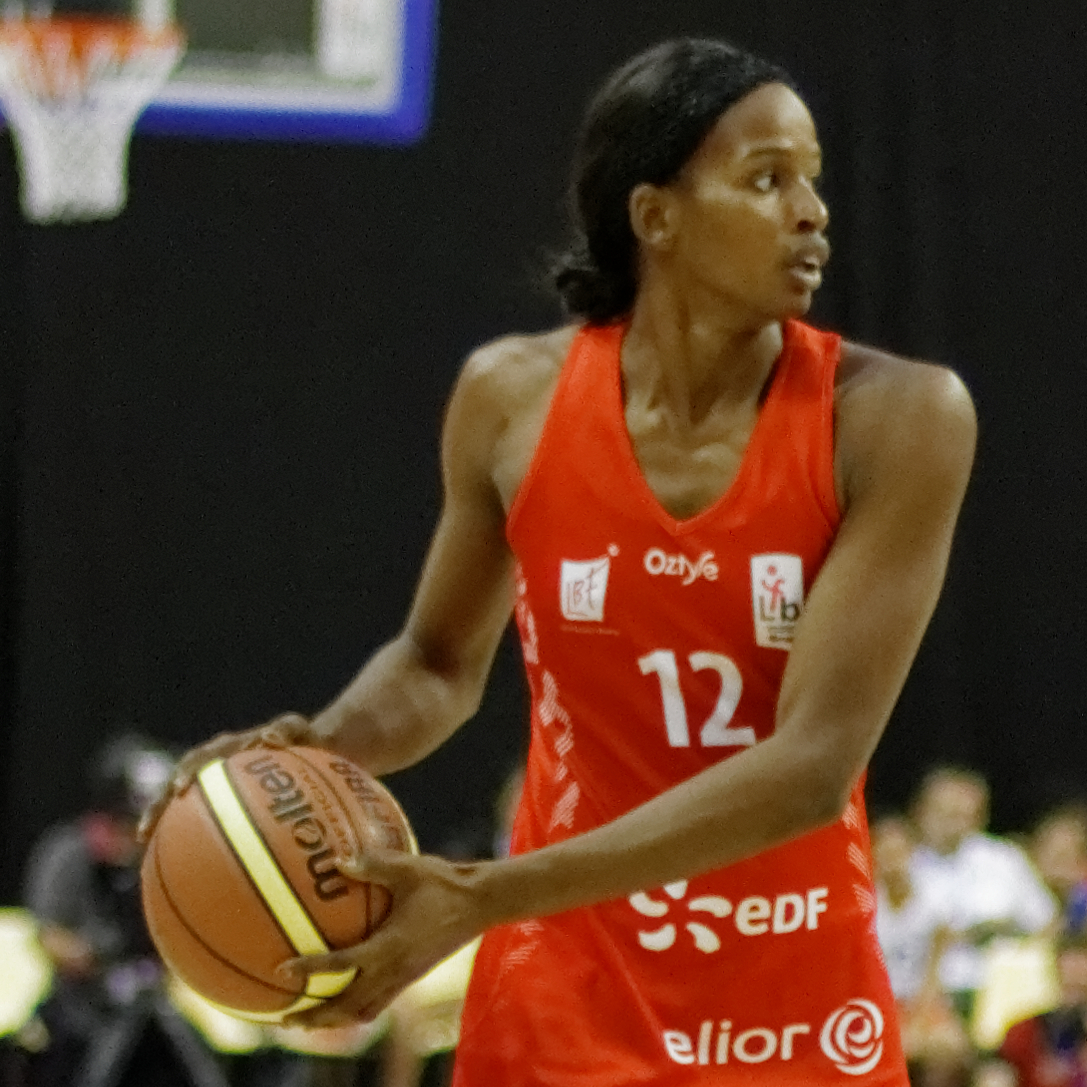

No. 12 – ESB Villeneuve-d'Ascq
- Position: Power forward / center
- League: LFB

Personal information
- Born: 25 March 1985 (age 41) Dakar, Senegal
- Listed height: 1.82 m (6 ft 0 in)
- Listed weight: 82 kg (181 lb)

Career information
- WNBA draft: 2007: undrafted

Mame-Marie Sy-Diop (born 25 March 1985) is a Senegalese basketball player. In 2009 she was a member of the Senegal team when they won the FIBA Africa Championship for Women that year. She was a member of the Senegal women's national basketball team at the 2016 Summer Olympics.
