= Fatou Dieng (basketball) =

Senegalese basketball player (born 1983)

CB Al-Qázeres
- Position: Point guard
- League: LFB

Personal information
- Born: 18 August 1983 (age 43) Kayar, Senegal
- Listed height: 1.67 m (5 ft 6 in)
- Listed weight: 59 kg (130 lb)

Career information
- Playing career: 2002–present

Career history
- 2002–2003: CJM Bourges Basket
- 2003–2004: Valenciennes
- 2004–2005: Pays d'Aix Basket 13
- 2005–2009: CB Puig d'en Valls
- 2010–2014: Perpignan
- 2014–: Al-Qazeres

There is another Senegalese division 1 basketball player of this name, born in 1982.

Fatou Dieng (born 18 August 1983) is a Senegalese female basketball player. She is also a French citizen.
