= Naîgnouma Coulibaly =

Malian basketball player (born 1989)

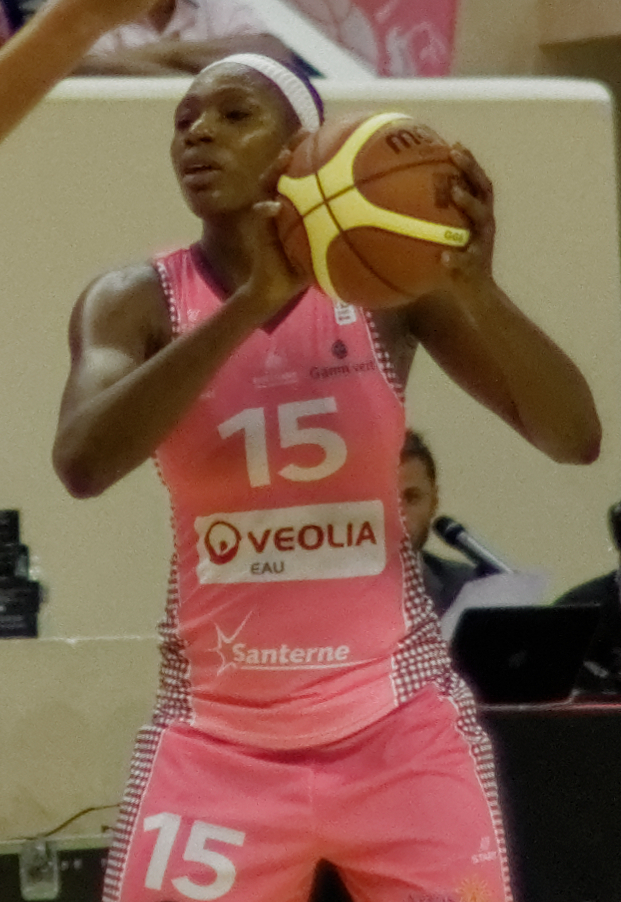
- Coulibaly in 2013

Cavigal Nice Basket
- Position: Center
- League: LFB

Personal information
- Born: 31 May 1989 (age 37) Bamako, Mali
- Listed height: 1.91 m (6 ft 3 in)
Medals
Women's basketball
Representing Mali
African Games
Gold medal – first place	2015 Brazzaville	Team
AfroBasket
Bronze medal – third place	2017 Mali

Naîgnouma Coulibaly (born 31 May 1989) is a Malian women's basketball player with Cavigal Nice Basket of the Ligue Féminine de Basketball and the Mali women's national basketball team. After winning the FIBA Africa Championship for Women 2007, Coulibaly represented Mali at the 2008 Summer Olympics.

After a long period in France, she joined in early September 2014 the Hungarian club DVTK Miskolc, which competes in the Eurocoupe. After spending the 2015–2016 season in Spain with Girona for 9.4 points and 8.6 rebounds in the championship and 8.5 points and 7.2 rebounds in the Euroleague, she commits to the Turkish club Canik. After three abroad, she returned to the LFB for 2017–2018 with Nice.

In January 2022, after leaving the Russian club Syktyvkar, she made her return to France with the Flammes Carolo.
