= Deolinda Ngulela =

Mozambican basketball player

Desportivo de Maputo
- Position: Shooting guard

Personal information
- Born: 18 April 1981 (age 45) Maputo, Mozambique
- Listed height: 1.70 m (5 ft 7 in)

Career information
- Playing career: 2011–present

Career history
- 2011–present: Desportivo de Maputo

Deolinda Ngulela (born 18 April 1981) is a Mozambican female professional basketball player.
