= 2005 FIBA Africa Championship for Women squads =

This article displays the rosters for the participating teams at the 2005 FIBA Africa Championship for Women.

== Group A ==
=== Cape Verde ===
Cape Verde women's national basketball team – 2005 FIBA Africa Championship – 7th place roster
Players
Coaches

Pos.	No.	Name	Age – Date of birth	Height	Club	Ctr.
	4	Jade Leitão	22 – 13 July 1983	1.80 m (5 ft 11 in)
C	5	Crispina Correia	30 – 5 November 1975	1.91 m (6 ft 3 in)
	6	Louisa da Conceição	31 – 7 December 1974
	7	Rosângela Lopes	26 – 14 March 1979
	8	Carla Sousa	29 – 26 October 1976
	9	Tatianne Cabral	26 – 9 January 1979
	10	Letícia Oliveira	29 – 21 November 1976
	11	Rosângela Lagos	25 – 9 May 1980
	12	Denise Fonseca	25 – 12 May 1980
	13	Débora Gonçalves	20 – 19 February 1985
	14	Maria da Costa	36 – 24 March 1969
	15	Sofia Silva	29 – 21 November 1976

Head coach

Assistant coach

Legend

- (C) Team captain
- Club field describes current club

=== Mali ===
Mali women's national basketball team – 2005 FIBA Africa Championship – 5th place roster
Players
Coaches

Pos.	No.	Name	Age – Date of birth	Height	Club	Ctr.
G	4	Kadia Touré	22 – 18 January 1983	1.80 m (5 ft 11 in)
	5	Kadiatou Kanoute	27 – 11 June 1978	1.78 m (5 ft 10 in)
	6	Fatoumata Dia	20 – 26 January 1985
	7	Oumou Kone	26 – 3 July 1979
G	8	Aminata Seremé	21 – 1 January 1984	1.68 m (5 ft 6 in)
	9	Hamchétou Maïga	27 – 25 April 1978	1.84 m (6 ft 0 in)
	10	Fanta Toure	16 – 18 February 1989
	11	Kadiatou Drame	26 – 25 December 1979
C	12	Djene Diawara	20 – 29 January 1985	1.92 m (6 ft 4 in)
	13	Meiya Tirera	19 – 15 April 1986	1.87 m (6 ft 2 in)
C	14	Aminata Sininta	20 – 23 December 1985	1.88 m (6 ft 2 in)
C	15	Naignouma Coulibaly	16 – 31 May 1989	1.92 m (6 ft 4 in)

Head coach

Assistant coach

Legend

- (C) Team captain
- Club field describes current club

=== Nigeria ===
Nigeria women's national basketball team – 2005 FIBA Africa Championship – Gold medal roster
Players
Coaches

Pos.	No.	Name	Age – Date of birth	Height	Club	Ctr.
	4	Nwamaka Adibeli	20 – 10 March 1985
	5	Patricia Chukwuma	20 – 18 March 1985
G	6	Mobolaji Akiode	23 – 12 May 1982	1.90 m (6 ft 3 in)
	7	Oluchi Okorie	24 – 28 August 1981
	8	Funmilayo Ojelabi	20 – 25 January 1985
F	9	Aisha Mohammed	20 – 21 October 1985	1.93 m (6 ft 4 in)
	10	Mary Apiafi	27 – 16 May 1978
F	11	Mfon Udoka	29 – 16 June 1976	1.90 m (6 ft 3 in)
F	12	Rashidat Sadiq	24 – 3 January 1981	1.88 m (6 ft 2 in)
G	13	Mactabene Amachree	27 – 30 January 1978	1.90 m (6 ft 3 in)
	14	Priscilla Udeaja	21 – 29 June 1984
C	15	Ugo Oha	23 – 18 July 1982	1.93 m (6 ft 4 in)

Head coach

- (United States) Sam Vincent

Assistant coach

Legend

- (C) Team captain
- Club field describes current club

=== Senegal ===
Senegal women's national basketball team – 2005 FIBA Africa Championship – Silver Medal roster
Players
Coaches

Pos.	No.	Name	Age – Date of birth	Height	Club	Ctr.
	4	Aminata Nar Diop	23 – 21 July 1982
G	5	Ndialou Paye	31 – 29 January 1974	1.70 m (5 ft 7 in)
	6	Oumou Dia	25 – 9 August 1980
F	7	Awa Gueye	27 – 31 August 1978	1.82 m (6 ft 0 in)
F	8	Mame Diodio Diouf	21 – 15 December 1984	1.75 m (5 ft 9 in)
PF	9	Salimata Diatta	24 – 14 April 1981	1.84 m (6 ft 0 in)
PF	10	Astou Traore	24 – 30 April 1981	1.81 m (5 ft 11 in)
	11	Anta Sy	30 – 14 May 1975
F	12	Awa Doumbia	26 – 8 August 1979	1.82 m (6 ft 0 in)
	13	Fama Fall	31 – 27 January 1974
C	14	Astou Ndiaye	32 – 5 November 1973	1.89 m (6 ft 2 in)
C	15	Ndeye Ndiaye	26 – 2 May 1979	1.89 m (6 ft 2 in)

Head coach

Assistant coach

Legend

- (C) Team captain
- Club field describes current club

=== Togo ===
Togo women's national basketball team – 2005 FIBA Africa Championship – 10th place roster
Players
Coaches

Pos.	No.	Name	Age – Date of birth	Height	Club	Ctr.
	4	Amah Adjoussi	21 – 8 December 1984
	5	Yendoumban Kpangou	21 – 19 December 1984
	6	Akossiwa Layibo	18 – 1 January 1987
	7	Abra Agossa	18 – 12 November 1987
	8	Rafia Coubadja	30 – 18 August 1975
	9	Rachidatou Salami	22 – 5 May 1983
	10	Sockewoé Atohoun	20 – 23 March 1985
	11	Massan Kpogo	21 – 24 December 1984
	12	Bayi Adekambi	25 – 14 October 1980
	13	Anna Koagni	19 – 14 September 1986
	14	Adjovi Afanwoubo	18 – 21 December 1987
	15	Lamandou Bodjona	24 – 4 July 1981

Head coach

Assistant coach

Legend

- (C) Team captain
- Club field describes current club

== Group B ==
=== Angola ===
Angola women's national basketball team – 2005 FIBA Africa Championship – 6th place roster
Players
Coaches

Pos.	No.	Name	Age – Date of birth	Height	Club	Ctr.
G	4	Catarina Camufal	25 – 30 March 1980	1.67 m (5 ft 6 in)	Interclube	(Angola)
	5	Luísa Miguel	30 – 13 June 1975			(Angola)
PG	6	Domitila Ventura	27 – 28 November 1978	1.63 m (5 ft 4 in)	Primeiro de Agosto	(Angola)
SF	7	Ângela Cardoso	26 – 9 April 1979	1.80 m (5 ft 11 in)	Primeiro de Agosto	(Angola)
	8	Isabel Francisco	25 – 21 July 1980	1.66 m (5 ft 5 in)	Primeiro de Agosto	(Angola)
	9	Bárbara Guimarães	25 – 14 September 1980		Primeiro de Agosto	(Angola)
PF	10	Irene Guerreiro	35 – 10 September 1970	1.72 m (5 ft 8 in)	Interclube	(Angola)
C	11	Luísa Tomás	22 – 24 March 1983	1.93 m (6 ft 4 in)		(Angola)
SG	12	Astrida Vicente	27 – 6 October 1978	1.73 m (5 ft 8 in)	Primeiro de Agosto	(Angola)
	13	Fátima Quinzele	28 – 2 March 1977			(Angola)
PF	14	Ernestina Neto	26 – 6 November 1979	1.85 m (6 ft 1 in)	Primeiro de Agosto	(Angola)
SF	15	Ngiendula Filipe	23 – 20 May 1982	1.78 m (5 ft 10 in)	Interclube	(Angola)

Head coach

- (Angola) Aníbal Moreira

Assistant coach

Legend

- (C) Team captain
- Club field describes current club

=== DR Congo ===
DR Congo women's national basketball team – 2005 FIBA Africa Championship – 4th place roster
Players
Coaches

Pos.	No.	Name	Age – Date of birth	Height	Club	Ctr.
	4	Mwadi Mabika	29 – 22 July 1976
	5	Tangama-Tshuina	28 – 30 June 1977
G	6	Armelie Kalonda	17 – 30 March 1988	1.72 m (5 ft 8 in)
	7	Kankengwa Pikinini	34 – 29 June 1971
	8	Kikwiki Munono	26 – 30 July 1979
	9	Mbudi-Nkoko	23 – 1 July 1982
	10	Musau Kalundu	28 – 30 November 1977
C	11	Marie Kitoko	19 – 8 April 1986	1.83 m (6 ft 0 in)
	12	Felekeni Bamati	26 – 25 December 1979
	13	Irene Nyama	36 – 28 November 1969
C	14	Chanelle Modiri	17 – 13 October 1988	1.90 m (6 ft 3 in)
	15	Pauline Nsimbo	23 – 9 January 1982

Head coach

Assistant coach

Legend

- (C) Team captain
- Club field describes current club

=== Gabon ===
Gabon women's national basketball team – 2005 FIBA Africa Championship – 9th place roster
Players
Coaches

Pos.	No.	Name	Age – Date of birth	Height	Club	Ctr.
	4	Karine Mebyame	26 – 4 June 1987
	5	Cynthia Onangah	28 – 10 April 1985
	6	Ghislaine Aboghe	32 – 14 May 1981
	7	Moulika Moussonda	28 – 22 July 1984
	8	Emilienne Nziengue	29 – 5 July 1984
	9	Nelly Leyama	38 – 28 January 1975
	10	Aline Etoubé	35 – 20 October 1977
	11	Marie Yeno	39 – 29 December 1973
	12	Bertille Adogue	43 – 16 August 1969
	13	Clarisse Sila	35 – 2 June 1978
	14	Julie NKoma	32 – 2 June 1981
	15	Yabale Kopia	36 – 31 August 1976

Head coach

Assistant coach

Legend

- (C) Team captain
- Club field describes current club

=== Niger ===
Niger women's national basketball team – 2005 FIBA Africa Championship – 8th place roster
Players
Coaches

Pos.	No.	Name	Age – Date of birth	Height	Club	Ctr.
	4	Fati Hassane	21 – 23 October 1984
	5	Ramatou Harouna	20 – 22 April 1985
	6	Kafui Vouti	31 – 31 January 1974
	7	Jamila Djibo	21 – 21 March 1984
	8	Zelika Eloga	23 – 1 January 1982
	9	Reynatou Tchirgny	25 – 14 August 1980
	10	Aïchatou Karimou	25 – 7 August 1980
	11	Fanna Mamani	20 – 21 October 1985
	12	Hindatou Zakari	20 – 20 March 1985
	13	Amina Mamani	23 – 14 April 1982
	14	Hassiatou Adamou	21 – 7 October 1984
	15	Aïssa Gourouza	20 – 11 March 1985

Head coach

Assistant coach

Legend

- (C) Team captain
- Club field describes current club

=== Mozambique ===
Mozambique women's national basketball team – 2005 FIBA Africa Championship – Bronze medal roster
Players
Coaches

Pos.	No.	Name	Age – Date of birth	Height	Club	Ctr.
	4	Valerdina Manhonga	25 – 26 December 1980	1.68 m (5 ft 6 in)
	5	Tânia Wachena	20 – 15 December 1985
	6	Ondina Nhampossa	26 – 18 June 1979	1.84 m (6 ft 0 in)
	7	Anabela Cossa	19 – 7 April 1986	1.72 m (5 ft 8 in)
	8	Amélia Macamo	20 – 23 September 1985
	9	Nádia Rodrigues	25 – 8 April 1980
	10	Nica Gemo	23 – 2 December 1982
	11	Aleia Rachide	20 – 23 January 1985
	12	Rute Muianga	22 – 6 April 1983
	13	Eduarda Chongo	22 – 3 September 1983
	14	Iracema Ndauane	25 – 19 October 1980
C	15	Deolinda Gimo	18 – 15 August 1987	1.90 m (6 ft 3 in)

Head coach

- (United States) Nelson Isley

Assistant coach

Legend

- (C) Team captain
- Club field describes current club

== See also ==
- 2005 FIBA Africa Women's Clubs Champions Cup squads
