= 2005 FIBA Africa Championship for Women =

2005 FIBA Women's AfroBasket
17th FIBA Women's African Basketball Championship

Tournament details
- Host country: Nigeria
- Dates: December 20–28
- Teams: 10
- Venue: 1 (in 1 host city)

Final positions
- Champions: Nigeria (2nd title)

Tournament statistics
- MVP: (Nigeria) Mfon Udoka
- Top scorer: (Nigeria) Udoka 15.5
- Top rebounds: (Niger) Eloga 11
- Top assists: (Nigeria) Ojelabi 3.2
- PPG (Team): Nigeria 75.7
- RPG (Team): Nigeria 52.3
- APG (Team): Nigeria 14

Official website
- 2005 FIBA Africa Championship for Women

The 2005 FIBA Africa Championship for Women was the 17th FIBA Africa Championship for Women, played under the rules of FIBA, the world governing body for basketball, and the FIBA Africa thereof. The tournament was hosted by Nigeria from December 20 to 28, with the games played at the Indoor Sports Hall in Abuja.

Nigeria defeated Senegal 64–57 in the final to win their first title with both teams securing a spot at the 2006 FIBA Women's World Cup.

== Draw ==
Group A	Group B
Cape Verde; Mali; Nigeria; Senegal; Togo	Angola; DR Congo; Gabon; Niger; Mozambique

== Preliminary round ==
Times given below are in UTC.

=== Group A ===
Qualified for the semi-finals

Team	Pts.	W	L	PF	PA	Diff
Senegal	8	4	0	267	169	+98
Nigeria	7	3	1	312	170	+142
Mali	6	2	2	259	202	+57
Cape Verde	5	1	3	209	298	-89
Togo	4	0	4	127	335	-208

December 21
11:00

Boxscore

Mali	41–51	Senegal
Scoring by quarter: 10-8, 11-18, 17-12, 3-13
Pts: Maïga Ba 16; Rebs: Maïga Ba 9 Asts: Dia 3		Pts: Ndeye Ndiaye 19; Rebs: Ndeye Ndiaye 11; Asts: A.Ndiaye 3

Indoor Sports Hall, Abuja

December 21
19:00

Boxscore

Cape Verde	38–96	Nigeria
Scoring by quarter: 11-21, 15-25, 5-28, 7-22
Pts: Jade, Louisa 9 Rebs: Crispina 7 Asts: R.Lagos 3		Pts: Udoka, Okorie 16; Rebs: Udoka 14; Asts: Ojelabi 7

Indoor Sports Hall, Abuja

December 22
16:30

Boxscore

Cape Verde	76–44	Togo
Scoring by quarter: 16-11, 17-11, 19-5, 24-17
Pts: Jade 17; Rebs: Crispina 17; Asts: Jade, Letícia 4		Pts: Adjoussi 11; Rebs: Afanwoubo 11; Asts: Koagni 2

Indoor Sports Hall, Abuja

December 22
19:00

Boxscore

Nigeria	55–65 (OT)	Senegal
Scoring by quarter: 9-8, 13-11, 18-19, 14-16, Overtime: 1-11
Pts: Sadiq 12; Rebs: Udoka 9 Asts: Udoka 4		Pts: Gueye 17; Rebs: N.Ndiaye 7 Asts: D.Diouf 6

Indoor Sports Hall, Abuja

December 23
16:30

Boxscore

Cape Verde	56–81	Mali
Scoring by quarter: 12-25, 7-17, 14-24, 23-15
Pts: Crispina, Jade 13; Rebs: Crispina, R.Lopes 5 Asts: Jade 3		Pts: Maïga Ba 23; Rebs: Sininta 16; Asts: Dia, Drame 4

Indoor Sports Hall, Abuja

December 23
19:00

Boxscore

Nigeria	92–23	Togo
Scoring by quarter: 25-5, 25-7, 22-9, 20-2
Pts: Amachree 18; Rebs: Apiafi 11; Asts: Ojelabi 5		Pts: Adjoussi 6 Rebs: Koagni 7 Asts: four players 1

Indoor Sports Hall, Abuja

December 24
16:30

Boxscore

Togo	26–93	Mali
Scoring by quarter: 8-19, 8-25, 6-30, 4-19
Pts: Salami 6 Rebs: Afanwoubo 8 Asts: Salami 2		Pts: Kanoute 18; Rebs: Diawara, Coulibaly 9 Asts: F.Toure, Drame 3

Indoor Sports Hall, Abuja

December 24
19:00

Boxscore

Senegal	77–39	Cape Verde
Scoring by quarter: 21-11, 20-8, 15-8, 21-12
Pts: As.Traoré 20; Rebs: As.Traoré 6 Asts: Ndialou Paye 6		Pts: Crispina 14; Rebs: Crispina, Tatianne 10; Asts: Letícia 3

Indoor Sports Hall, Abuja

December 26
16:30

Boxscore

Togo	34–74	Senegal
Scoring by quarter: 11-23, 5-20, 9-15, 9-16
Pts: Salami 14; Rebs: Salami 8 Asts: Salami 3		Pts: Diop 14; Rebs: As.Traoré 9 Asts: A.Ndiaye 5

Indoor Sports Hall, Abuja

December 26
19:00

Boxscore

Nigeria	69–44	Mali
Scoring by quarter: 19-15, 24-8, 14-11, 12-10
Pts: Udoka 24; Rebs: Mohammed 10; Asts: Adibeli 3		Pts: Maïga Ba 9 Rebs: Maïga Ba 8 Asts: Sininta 2

Indoor Sports Hall, Abuja

=== Group B ===
Qualified for the semi-finals

Team	Pts.	W	L	PF	PA	Diff
DR Congo	8	4	0	276	176	+100
Mozambique	7	3	1	228	190	+38
Angola	6	2	2	245	167	+78
Niger	5	1	3	165	280	-115
Gabon	4	0	4	145	246	-101

December 21
13:00

Boxscore

DR Congo	60–46	Mozambique
Scoring by quarter: 19-9, 12-11, 20-14, 9-12
Pts: Nsimbo 26; Rebs: Nsimbo 15; Asts: Kalonda 6		Pts: Wachena 9 Rebs: Iracema 6 Asts: Rute 4

Indoor Sports Hall, Abuja

December 22
16:30

Boxscore

Mozambique	52–51	Angola
Scoring by quarter: 19-13, 8-14, 10-8, 15-16
Pts: Iracema 10; Rebs: Iracema 13; Asts: Valerdina, Aleia 2		Pts: Irene 16; Rebs: Bárbara, Luísa 6 Asts: Domitila 4

Indoor Sports Hall, Abuja

December 22
19:00

Boxscore

DR Congo	75–38	Gabon
Scoring by quarter: 31-10, 12-7, 13-9, 19-12
Pts: Mabika 17; Rebs: Nyama 13; Asts: Tshuina 3		Pts: Cynthia Onangah 8 Rebs: Kopia 8 Asts: four players 1

Indoor Sports Hall, Abuja

December 23
16:30

Boxscore

DR Congo	88–40	Niger
Scoring by quarter: 15-14, 17-12, 28-10, 28-4
Pts: Nkoko 15; Rebs: Munono 8 Asts: Tshuina, Pikinini 4		Pts: Karimou 12; Rebs: Adamou, Zakari 7 Asts: Karimou 3

Indoor Sports Hall, Abuja

December 23
19:00

Boxscore

Mozambique	55–33	Gabon
Scoring by quarter: 15-5, 14-14, 17-11, 9-3
Pts: Rute 17; Rebs: Rute 6 Asts: Rute 5		Pts: Kopia 16; Rebs: Kopia 11; Asts: Moussonda 2

Indoor Sports Hall, Abuja

December 24
16:30

Boxscore

Gabon	38–53	Niger
Scoring by quarter: 14-15, 6-15, 10-12, 8-11
Pts: Mebyame 9 Rebs: Kopia 8 Asts: Moussonda 3		Pts: Adamou 14; Rebs: Eloga 13; Asts: Karimou 3

Indoor Sports Hall, Abuja

December 24
19:00

Boxscore

Angola	52–53	DR Congo
Scoring by quarter: 15-9, 13-16, 8-14, 16-14
Pts: Ernestina 19; Rebs: Ernestina 13; Asts: Domitila 3		Pts: Mabika 18; Rebs: Nsimbo 13; Asts: Mabika 3

Indoor Sports Hall, Abuja

December 25
16:30

Boxscore

Niger	26–79	Angola
Scoring by quarter: 3-20, 6-22, 13-11, 4-26
Pts: Eloga 10; Rebs: Eloga 16; Asts: 0		Pts: Astrida 23; Rebs: Ernestina, Ângela 9 Asts: Bárbara 3

Indoor Sports Hall, Abuja

December 26
16:30

Boxscore

Mozambique	75–46	Niger
Scoring by quarter: 21-11, 31-10, 13-9, 10-16
Pts: Nádia 15; Rebs: Iracema 13; Asts: four players 2		Pts: Adamou 14; Rebs: Eloga, Hassane 7 Asts: Zakari 3

Indoor Sports Hall, Abuja

December 26
19:00

Boxscore

Gabon	36–63	Angola
Scoring by quarter: 14-17, 4-26, 16-8, 2-12
Pts: Aboghe 14; Rebs: Kopia 7 Asts: 0		Pts: Irene, Bárbara 13; Rebs: Catarina, Ngiendula 6 Asts: Irene 5

Indoor Sports Hall, Abuja

== Knockout stage ==
=== 9th place match ===
December 27
11:00

Boxscore

Gabon	47–36	Togo
Scoring by quarter: 12-6, 10-8, 16-8, 9-14
Pts: Ongadia 13; Rebs: Kopia 14; Asts: Nziengue 2		Pts: Salami 11; Rebs: Afanwoubo 7 Asts: Salami 3

Indoor Sports Hall, Abuja

=== 7th place match ===
December 27
13:30

Boxscore

Niger	51–56	Cape Verde
Scoring by quarter: 6-14, 20-16, 20-5, 5-21
Pts: Karimou 21; Rebs: Eloga 16; Asts: Harouna 3		Pts: Crispina 16; Rebs: Crispina 14; Asts: R.Lagos 7

Indoor Sports Hall, Abuja

=== 5th place match ===
December 28
11:00

Boxscore

Angola	50–55	Mali
Scoring by quarter: 10-12, 6-15, 18-16, 16-12
Pts: Irene 19; Rebs: Luísa 8 Asts: Bárbara 4		Pts: Maïga Ba 14; Rebs: Sininta 12; Asts: Sininta 5

Indoor Sports Hall, Abuja

=== Semifinals bracket ===
Semi-finals
December 27 - 16:30
Senegal	66
Mozambique	37
December 27 - 19:00
DR Congo	66
Nigeria	78

Final
December 28 - 19:00
Senegal	57
Nigeria	64
Third place
December 28 - 16:30
DR Congo	51
Mozambique	59

=== Semifinals ===
December 27
16:30

Boxscore

Senegal	66–37	Mozambique
Scoring by quarter: 12-16, 20-3, 21-10, 13-8
Pts: As.Traoré 25; Rebs: As.Traoré 11; Asts: D.Diouf 3		Pts: Rute 9 Rebs: three players 5 Asts: five players 1

Indoor Sports Hall, Abuja

December 27
19:00

Boxscore

DR Congo	66–78	Nigeria
Scoring by quarter: 16-27, 17-15, 25-16, 8-20
Pts: Mabika 18; Rebs: three players 8 Asts: Tshuina 2		Pts: Amachree 23; Rebs: Udoka 13; Asts: Amachree 4

Indoor Sports Hall, Abuja

=== Bronze medal match ===
December 28
16:30

Boxscore

DR Congo	51–59	Mozambique
Scoring by quarter: 18-12, 13-8, 10-17, 10-22
Pts: Pikinini 16; Rebs: Nsimbo 8 Asts: Tshuina 3		Pts: Rute 19; Rebs: Gimo 12; Asts: five players 1

Indoor Sports Hall, Abuja

=== Final ===
December 28
19:00

Boxscore

Senegal	57–64	Nigeria
Scoring by quarter: 18-22, 17-13, 16-14, 6-15
Pts: Gueye 16; Rebs: A.Ndiaye 8 Asts: Gueye, Anta Sy 2		Pts: Amachree 16; Rebs: Mohammed 12; Asts: Ojelabi 4

Indoor Sports Hall, Abuja

== Final standings ==
Qualified for the 2006 FIBA Women's World Cup

Rank	Team	Record
1st place, gold medalist(s)	Nigeria	5–1
2nd place, silver medalist(s)	Senegal	5–1
3rd place, bronze medalist(s)	Mozambique	4–2
4	DR Congo	4–2
5	Mali	3–2
6	Angola	2–3
7	Cape Verde	2–3
8	Niger	1–4
9	Gabon	1–4
10	Togo	0–5

Nigeria roster
Aisha Mohammed, Funmilayo Ojelabi, Mactabene Amachree, Mary Apiafi, Mfon Udoka, Mobolaji Akiode, Nwamaka Adibeli, Oluchi Okorie, Patricia Chukwuma, Priscilla Udeaja, Rashidat Sadiq, Ugo Oha, Coach: Scott Nnaji

== Awards ==
2005 FIBA Africa Championship for Women winners

Nigeria
Second title

Most Valuable Player
(Nigeria) Mfon Udoka

== Statistical Leaders ==
=== Individual Tournament Highs ===
Points

Rank	Name	G	Pts	PPG
1	(Nigeria) Mfon Udoka	6	93	15.5
2	(Mali) Hamchétou Maïga	5	73	14.6
3	(Democratic Republic of the Congo) Mwadi Mabika	5	72	14.4
4	(Nigeria) Makbule Amachree	6	85	14.2
5	(Senegal) Astou Traoré	6	80	13.3
6	(Angola) Irene Guerreiro	5	63	12.6
7	(Cape Verde) Crispina Correia	5	62	12.4
8	(Cape Verde) Jade Leitão	5	61	12.2
9	(Democratic Republic of the Congo) Pauline Nsimbo	6	69	11.5
10	(Mozambique) Rute Muianga	6	65	10.8

Rebounds

Rank	Name	G	Rbs	RPG
1	(Niger) Zelika Eloga	5	55	11
2	(Cape Verde) Crispina Correia	5	53	10.6
3	(Gabon) Yabale Kopia	5	48	9.6
4	(Nigeria) Mfon Udoka	6	57	9.5
5	(Niger) Hassiatou Adamou	5	47	9.4
5	(Democratic Republic of the Congo) Pauline Nsimbo	6	50	8.3
7	(Mozambique) Iracema Ndauane	6	48	8
8	(Mali) Aminata Sininta	5	40	8
9	(Mali) Hamchétou Maïga	5	39	7.8
10	(Nigeria) Aisha Mohammed	6	44	7.3

Assists

Rank	Name	G	Ast	APG
1	(Nigeria) Funmilayo Ojelabi	6	19	3.2
2	(Cape Verde) Letícia Oliveira	5	15	3
3	(Senegal) Mame Diodio Diouf	6	17	2.8
4	(Democratic Republic of the Congo) Tangama-Tshuina	6	15	2.5
5	(Mali) Fatoumata Dia	5	12	2.4
5	(Cape Verde) Jade Leitão	5	12	2.4
7	(Nigeria) Nwamaka Adibeli	6	14	2.3
7	(Democratic Republic of the Congo) Armelie Kalonda	6	14	2.3
9	(Nigeria) Makbule Amachree	6	13	2.2
10	(Mali) Aminata Sininta	5	11	2.2

Steals

Rank	Name	G	Stl	SPG
1	(Angola) Astrida Vicente	5	13	2.6
2	(Democratic Republic of the Congo) Armelie Kalonda	6	15	2.5
2	(Senegal) Ndialou Paye	6	15	2.5
4	(Mozambique) Rute Muianga	6	12	2
5	(Niger) Hassiatou Adamou	5	10	2
5	(Mali) Fatoumata Dia	5	10	2
5	(Gabon) Yabale Kopia	5	10	2
8	(Angola) Catarina Camufal	4	8	2
9	(Nigeria) Makbule Amachree	6	11	1.8
9	(Senegal) Awa Gueye	6	11	1.8

Blocks

Rank	Name	G	Blk	BPG
1	(Democratic Republic of the Congo) Chanelle Modiri	6	13	2.2
2	(Senegal) Astou Ndiaye	6	9	1.5
3	(Cape Verde) Crispina Correia	5	7	1.4
3	(Niger) Zelika Eloga	5	7	1.4
3	(Senegal) Ndeye Ndiaye	5	7	1.4
3	(Mali) Aminata Sininta	5	7	1.4
7	(Democratic Republic of the Congo) Pauline Nsimbo	6	7	1.2
8	(Nigeria) Mary Apiafi	3	3	1
9	(Mozambique) Nica Gemo	6	5	0.8
10	(Mali) Djene Diawara	5	4	0.8

Fouls

Rank	Name	G	Min	FPG
1	(Niger) Zelika Eloga	5	18	3.6
2	(Democratic Republic of the Congo) Mwadi Mabika	5	17	3.4
3	(Democratic Republic of the Congo) Pauline Nsimbo	6	19	3.2
4	(Gabon) Moulika Moussonda	5	16	3.2
4	(Cape Verde) Letícia Oliveira	5	16	3.2
4	(Angola) Ernestina Neto	5	16	3.2
7	(Senegal) Anta Sy	6	18	3
8	(Gabon) Yabale Kopia	5	15	3
8	(Mali) Hamchétou Maïga	5	15	3
10	(Cape Verde) Crispina Correia	5	14	2.8

=== Individual Game Highs ===
Department	Name	Total	Opponent
Points	(Democratic Republic of the Congo) Pauline Nsimbo	26	Mozambique
Rebounds	(Cape Verde) Crispina Correia	17	Togo
Assists	(Nigeria) Funmilayo Ojelabi (Cape Verde) Letícia Oliveira	7	Cape Verde; Niger
Steals	(Senegal) Ndialou Paye	7	Cape Verde
Blocks	(Senegal) Astou Ndiaye	7	Cape Verde
2-point field goal percentage	(Mali) Hamchétou Maïga	100% (9/9)	Cape Verde
3-point field goal percentage	(Nigeria) Mfon Udoka	100% (3/3)	Mali
Free throw percentage	(Nigeria) Mfon Udoka (Nigeria) Ugo Oha	100% (6/6)	Senegal; Cape Verde
Turnovers	(Togo) Amah Adjoussi	10	Nigeria

=== Team Tournament Highs ===
Points

Pos.	Name	PPG
1	Nigeria	75.7
2	DR Congo	65.5
3	Senegal	65
4	Mali	62.8
5	Angola	59
6	Mozambique	54
7	Cape Verde	53
8	Niger	43.2
9	Gabon	38.4
10	Togo	32.6

Rebounds

Pos.	Name	RPG
1	Nigeria	52.3
2	Mali	46.6
3	Niger	44.4
4	DR Congo	42.2
5	Angola	38.6
6	Mozambique	38.5
7	Senegal	37.3
8	Gabon	36.8
9	Cape Verde	36.6
10	Togo	36

Assists

Pos.	Name	APG
1	Nigeria	14
2	Senegal	13.8
3	Mali	13
4	Cape Verde	11.8
5	Angola	10.8
6	DR Congo	10.3
7	Mozambique	8
8	Niger	6
9	Togo	4.8
10	Gabon	4.2

Steals

Pos.	Name	SPG
1	Senegal	14.2
2	Mali	12.6
3	Mozambique	11.7
4	Nigeria	10.8
5	Angola	10.8
6	Cape Verde	10
7	DR Congo	9.7
8	Gabon	9.4
9	Niger	7.8
10	Togo	5.6

Blocks

Pos.	Name	BPG
1	DR Congo	4.2
2	Senegal	3.2
3	Mali	3.2
3	Niger	3.2
5	Nigeria	2.5
6	Mozambique	2.2
7	Angola	1.8
7	Cape Verde	1.8
9	Togo	1.6
10	Gabon	0.8

Fouls

Pos.	Name	FPG
1	Mali	19.8
2	DR Congo	19.3
3	Cape Verde	18.8
4	Mozambique	18.5
5	Togo	18.4
6	Gabon	18
7	Niger	17.6
8	Nigeria	16.7
9	Angola	16.4
10	Senegal	16.3

2-point field goal percentage

Pos.	Name	%
1	Senegal	46.8
2	Nigeria	44.3
3	Mali	43.3
4	DR Congo	43.3
5	Angola	36
6	Mozambique	33.8
7	Cape Verde	33
8	Niger	31.2
9	Togo	25.3
10	Gabon	20.2

3-point field goal percentage

Pos.	Name	%
1	Nigeria	33.7
2	DR Congo	30.7
3	Angola	26.6
4	Cape Verde	24.2
5	Niger	20.9
6	Mozambique	20.5
7	Senegal	19.8
8	Mali	15.2
9	Togo	14.7
10	Gabon	12.5

Free throw percentage

Pos.	Name	%
1	Angola	61.4
2	Gabon	60.5
3	Senegal	57.7
4	DR Congo	57.1
5	Mali	56.3
6	Nigeria	55.5
7	Niger	52.9
8	Mozambique	52.3
9	Cape Verde	45.1
10	Togo	39.3

=== Team Game highs ===
Department	Name	Total	Opponent
Points	Nigeria	96	Cape Verde
Rebounds	Mali	74	Cape Verde
Assists	Senegal	23	Togo
Steals	Senegal	27	Cape Verde
Blocks	Senegal	9	Cape Verde
2-point field goal percentage	Senegal	56.2% (27/48)	Togo
3-point field goal percentage	Nigeria	75% (6/8)	Togo
Free throw percentage	Togo	100% (3/3)	Senegal
Turnovers	Cape Verde	42	Senegal

== See also ==
- 2005 FIBA Africa Women's Clubs Champions Cup
