= 2005 FIBA Africa Women's Clubs Champions Cup squads =

This article displays the rosters for the participating teams at the 2005 FIBA Africa Club Championship for Women.

== (Ivory Coast) Abidjan Basket Club ==
Abidjan Basket Club – 2005 FIBA Africa Women's Clubs Champions Cup – 7th place roster
Players							Coaches
Pos	#	Nat	Name	Height	Weight	Age	Head Coach
	4	(Ivory Coast)	Mariame Fofana			8 October 1983 (aged 22)	[[]]
	5	(Ivory Coast)	Ramatou Kone			8 June 1981 (aged 24)
	6	(Ivory Coast)	Mariame Gbané			16 April 1982 (aged 23)	Assistant coach(es)
	7	(Ivory Coast)	Agnès Kam Ini			31 July 1981 (aged 24)
G	8	(Ivory Coast)	Aïchata Diomande	1.69 m (5 ft 6 1/2 in)		17 July 1984 (aged 21)
	9	(Ivory Coast)	Masouratou Youssouf			11 November 1984 (aged 20)
	10	(Ivory Coast)	Louise Ngoy Muadi			26 November 1985 (aged 19)
	11	(Ivory Coast)	Hadjaratou Diarra			31 August 1983 (aged 22)
	12	(Ivory Coast)	Adjheï Abbady			17 June 1987 (aged 18)
	13	(Ivory Coast)	Mariame Sylla			20 March 1986 (aged 19)
	14	(Ivory Coast)	Brou N'Goran			4 May 1987 (aged 18)
	15	(Ivory Coast)	Akoubo Enan			10 July 1982 (aged 23)

== (Democratic Republic of the Congo) Arc-en-Ciel ==
Arc-en-Ciel – 2005 FIBA Africa Women's Clubs Champions Cup – 5th place roster
Players							Coaches
Pos	#	Nat	Name	Height	Weight	Age	Head Coach
	4	(Democratic Republic of the Congo)	Rukonkish Kamin			25 December 1979 (aged 25)	[[]]
	5	(Democratic Republic of the Congo)	Tangama-Tshuina			30 June 1977 (aged 28)
	6	(Democratic Republic of the Congo)	Puati Ndandu			17 January 1984 (aged 21)	Assistant coach(es)
F	7	(Democratic Republic of the Congo)	Ginette Taka	1.78 m (5 ft 10 in)		26 July 1986 (aged 19)
	8	(Democratic Republic of the Congo)	Ilanga Tshitshi			14 April 1977 (aged 28)
	9	(Democratic Republic of the Congo)	Mbudi-Nkoko			1 July 1982 (aged 23)
C	10	(Democratic Republic of the Congo)	Marie Kitoko	1.83 m (6 ft 0 in)		8 April 1986 (aged 19)
	11	(Democratic Republic of the Congo)	Tshibwabwa Katshabala			20 December 1982 (aged 22)
	12	(Democratic Republic of the Congo)	Musau Katalayi			24 February 1982 (aged 23)
	13	(Democratic Republic of the Congo)	Irene Nyama			28 November 1969 (aged 35)
	14	(Democratic Republic of the Congo)	Nelly Bopoli			16 July 1979 (aged 26)
	15	(Democratic Republic of the Congo)	Micheline Ngobe			18 September 1978 (aged 27)

== (Mali) Djoliba ==
Djoliba – 2005 FIBA Africa Women's Clubs Champions Cup – Gold medal roster
Players							Coaches
Pos	#	Nat	Name	Height	Weight	Age	Head Coach
G	4	(Mali)	Kadiatou Touré	1.74 m (5 ft 8 1/2 in)		18 January 1983 (aged 22)	[[]]
G	5	(Mali)	Djénébou Damba	1.67 m (5 ft 5 1/2 in)		11 July 1985 (aged 20)
	6	(Mali)	Fatoumata Dia			26 January 1985 (aged 20)	Assistant coach(es)
	7	(Mali)	Fatoumata Sanfo			24 February 1986 (aged 19)
G	8	(Mali)	Aminata Seremé	1.68 m (5 ft 6 in)		1 January 1984 (aged 21)
	9	(Mali)	Mariama Camara			19 September 1984 (aged 21)
	10	(Mali)	Fanta Toure			18 February 1989 (aged 16)
	11	(Mali)	Kadidiatou Drame			25 December 1979 (aged 25)
	12	(Mali)	Djeneba Samake			22 August 1985 (aged 20)
	13	(Mali)	Meiya Tirera			15 April 1986 (aged 19)
C	14	(Mali)	Aminata Sininta	1.85 m (6 ft 1 in)		23 December 1985 (aged 19)
	15	(Mali)	Fatoumata Konate			10 April 1986 (aged 19)

== (Nigeria) First Bank ==
First Bank – 2005 FIBA Africa Women's Clubs Champions Cup – Bronze medal roster
Players							Coaches
Pos	#	Nat	Name	Height	Weight	Age	Head Coach
	4	(Nigeria)	Bintu Bhadmus			10 November 1985 (aged 19)	[[]]
G	5	(Nigeria) (United States)	Mobolaji Akiode	1.90 m (6 ft 3 in)	75 kg (165 lb)	12 May 1982 (aged 23)
F	6	(Nigeria) (United States)	Mfon Udoka	1.90 m (6 ft 3 in)	84 kg (185 lb)	16 June 1976 (aged 29)	Assistant coach(es)
	7	(Nigeria)	Mary Chinweokwu			10 October 1985 (aged 19)
	8	(Nigeria)	Funmilayo Ojelabi			25 January 1985 (aged 20)
F	9	(Nigeria)	Aisha Mohammed	1.93 m (6 ft 4 in)	80 kg (180 lb)	21 October 1985 (aged 19)
	10	(Nigeria)	Tayelolu Adeniyi			23 March 1980 (aged 25)
G	11	(Nigeria)	Nguveren Iyorhe	1.87 m (6 ft 1 1/2 in)		9 June 1981 (aged 24)
	12	(Nigeria)	Patricia Chukwuma			18 March 1985 (aged 20)
	13	(Nigeria)	Ezinne James			22 June 1985 (aged 20)
	14	(Nigeria)	Priscilla Udeaja			29 June 1984 (aged 21)
	15	(Nigeria)	Sandra German			20 July 1984 (aged 21)

== (Mozambique) ISPU ==
ISPU – 2005 FIBA Africa Women's Clubs Champions Cup – 4th place roster
Players							Coaches
Pos	#	Nat	Name	Height	Weight	Age	Head Coach
	4	(Mozambique)	Vânia Filipe			4 September 1983 (aged 22)	[[]]
	6	(Mozambique)	Tânia Wachena			15 December 1985 (aged 19)	Assistant coach(es)
	7	(Mozambique)	Amélia Cabral			16 October 1977 (aged 27)
	8	(Mozambique)	Vaneza Júnior			7 September 1986 (aged 19)
	9	(Mozambique)	Amélia Macamo			23 September 1985 (aged 20)
	10	(Mozambique)	Carla Silva			12 March 1978 (aged 27)
	11	(Mozambique)	Aleia Rachide			23 January 1985 (aged 20)
	12	(Mozambique)	Zinóbia Machanguana			4 March 1977 (aged 28)
	14	(Mozambique)	Iracema Ndauane			19 October 1980 (aged 24)
	15	(Mozambique)	Deolinda Gimo			15 August 1987 (aged 18)

== (Angola) Primeiro de Agosto ==
Primeiro de Agosto – 2005 FIBA Africa Women's Clubs Champions Cup – Silver medal roster
Players							Coaches
Pos	#	Nat	Name	Height	Weight	Age	Head Coach
	4	(Democratic Republic of the Congo)	Pauline Nsimbo			9 January 1982 (aged 23)	(Angola) Higino Garcia
	5	(Angola)	Luísa Miguel			13 June 1975 (aged 30)
	6	(Angola)	Domitila Ventura			28 November 1978 (aged 26)	Assistant coach(es)
	7	(Angola)	Ângela Cardoso			9 April 1979 (aged 26)
	8	(Angola)	Isabel Francisco			21 July 1980 (aged 25)
	9	(Angola)	Bárbara Guimarães			14 September 1980 (aged 25)
	10	(Angola)	Irene Guerreiro			10 September 1970 (aged 35)
	11	(Angola)	Luísa Tomás			24 March 1983 (aged 22)
	12	(Angola)	Astrida Vicente			6 October 1978 (aged 27)
	13	(Angola)	Sónia Guadalupe			15 September 1985 (aged 20)
	14	(Angola)	Ernestina Neto			6 November 1979 (aged 25)
	15	(Angola)	Jaquelina Francisco			16 March 1978 (aged 27)

== (Democratic Republic of the Congo) Radi ==
Radi – 2005 FIBA Africa Women's Clubs Champions Cup – 6th place roster
Players							Coaches
Pos	#	Nat	Name	Height	Weight	Age	Head Coach
G	4	(Democratic Republic of the Congo)	Flavie Ngono	1.69 m (5 ft 6 1/2 in)		4 July 1986 (aged 19)	[[]]
	5	(Democratic Republic of the Congo)	Ukete Lukokesha			24 April 1981 (aged 24)
	6	(Democratic Republic of the Congo)	Ilashi Vale			29 May 1981 (aged 24)	Assistant coach(es)
	7	(Democratic Republic of the Congo)	Monique Kanku			25 December 1982 (aged 22)
	8	(Democratic Republic of the Congo)	Lisa Kakolu			16 February 1983 (aged 22)
	9	(Democratic Republic of the Congo)	Mwange Kibenge			14 August 1975 (aged 30)
	10	(Democratic Republic of the Congo)	Mboya Mulanda			3 March 1974 (aged 31)
	11	(Democratic Republic of the Congo)	Kalenga Ngoy			22 February 1982 (aged 23)
	12	(Democratic Republic of the Congo)	Felekeni Bamati			25 December 1979 (aged 25)
	13	(Democratic Republic of the Congo)	Laurence Odimba			4 April 1973 (aged 32)
	14	(Democratic Republic of the Congo)	Musau Kalundu			30 November 1977 (aged 27)
	15	(Democratic Republic of the Congo)	Ngusu Mafuta			23 February 1989 (aged 16)

== (Gabon) Somo BB ==
Somo BB – 2005 FIBA Africa Women's Clubs Champions Cup – 8th place roster
Players							Coaches
Pos	#	Nat	Name	Height	Weight	Age	Head Coach
	4	(Gabon)	Aline Etoubé			20 October 1977 (aged 27)	[[]]
	5	(Gabon)	Bernice Ngoua			20 March 1984 (aged 21)
	6	(Gabon)	Synthia Benga			18 November 1978 (aged 26)	Assistant coach(es)
	7	(Gabon)	Elsie Ambouroue			24 April 1987 (aged 18)
	8	(Gabon)	Karine Mebyame			4 June 1987 (aged 18)
	9	(Gabon)	Prudence Fomboula			7 August 1981 (aged 24)
	10	(Gabon)	Ginette Olendé			28 December 1984 (aged 20)
	11	(Democratic Republic of the Congo)	Lifayafi Otono			31 December 1982 (aged 22)
	12	(Gabon)	Mathilde Okome			20 December 1979 (aged 25)
	13	(Gabon)	Emilienne Nziengue			5 July 1984 (aged 21)
	14	(Gabon)	Cynthia Mainza			15 September 1987 (aged 18)
	15	(Gabon)	Yabale Kopia			31 August 1976 (aged 29)
