= 2005 FIBA Africa Women's Clubs Champions Cup =

2005 FIBA Africa Champions Cup for Women
11th FIBA Africa Champions Cup for Women

Tournament details
- Host country: Mali
- Dates: October 2 – 9
- Teams: 8 (from 53 federations)
- Venue: 1 (in 1 host city)

Final positions
- Champions: Mali (Djoliba AC's 1st title; Mali's 1st title)

Tournament statistics
- MVP: (Democratic Republic of the Congo) Pauline Akonga-Nsimbo
- Top scorer: (Democratic Republic of the Congo) Nsimbo 21
- Top rebounds: (Nigeria) Udoka 11
- Top assists: (Mali) Sininta 3.6
- PPG (Team): (Mali) Djoliba AC 75.2
- RPG (Team): (Nigeria) First Bank 39.8
- APG (Team): (Mali) Djoliba AC 10.2

Official website
- 2005 FIBA Africa Women's Clubs Champions Cup

The 2005 FIBA Africa Women's Clubs Champions Cup (11th edition), was an international basketball tournament held in Bamako, Mali, from October 2 to 9, 2005. The tournament, organized by FIBA Africa and hosted by Djoliba AC, was contested by 8 clubs split into 2 groups, all of which qualifying for the knock-out stage (quarter, semis and final).

The tournament was won by home team Djoliba AC which qualified for the 2007 FIBA Women's World League.

== Draw ==
Group A	Group B
(Ivory Coast) Abidjan Basket Club (Mali) Djoliba AC (Democratic Republic of the Congo) Radi (Gabon) Somo BB	(Democratic Republic of the Congo) Arc-en-Ciel (Mozambique) ISPU (Nigeria) First Bank (Angola) Primeiro de Agosto

== Preliminary rounds ==
Times given below are local UTC.

=== Group A ===
Qualified for the quarter-finals

	Teams	M	W	L	PF	PA	Diff	P
1.	(Mali) Djoliba AC	3	3	0	184	80	+104	6
2.	(Gabon) Somo BB	3	2	1	108	135	-27	5
3.	(Ivory Coast) Abidjan Basket Club	3	1	2	139	174	-35	4
3.	(Democratic Republic of the Congo) Radi	3	0	3	56	98	-42	3

2 October 2005

Boxscore

Abidjan BC (Ivory Coast)	38–72	(Mali) Djoliba
Scoring by quarter: 5-16, 15-18, 8-27, 10-11
Pts: Abbady 10; Rebs: Abbady, Youssouf 4 Asts: Youssouf, Diomande 2		Pts: Drame 16; Rebs: Sininta 9 Asts: Sininta 4

3 October 2005

Somo BB (Gabon)	20–0	(Democratic Republic of the Congo) Radi
Scoring by quarter: n/a, n/a
Pts: n/a Rebs: n/a		Pts: n/a Rebs: n/a]

4 October 2005
15:00

Boxscore

Abidjan BC (Ivory Coast)	43–46	(Gabon) Somo BB
Pts: Enan 12; Rebs: Youssouf 8 Asts: Youssouf 2		Pts: Kopia 15; Rebs: Kopia 7 Asts: Nziengue 2

4 October 2005

Djoliba (Mali)	20–0	(Democratic Republic of the Congo) Radi
Scoring by quarter: n/a, n/a
Pts: n/a Rebs: n/a		Pts: n/a Rebs: n/a]

5 October 2005
17:00

Boxscore

Djoliba (Mali)	92–42	(Gabon) Somo BB
Pts: Seremé 25; Rebs: Sininta 14; Asts: Seremé 4		Pts: Mebyame 10; Rebs: Kopia 12; Asts: Benga 1

5 October 2005
19:00

Boxscore

Radi (Democratic Republic of the Congo)	56–58	(Ivory Coast) Abidjan BC
Pts: Kalundu 14; Rebs: Kalundu 10; Asts: Kakolu, Bamati 2		Pts: Youssouf 24; Rebs: Youssouf 18; Asts: Youssouf 5

=== Group B ===
Qualified for the quarter-finals

	Teams	M	W	L	PF	PA	Diff	P
1.	(Angola) Primeiro de Agosto	3	3	0	156	116	+40	6
2.	(Nigeria) First Bank	3	2	1	223	205	+18	5
3.	(Mozambique) ISPU	3	1	2	143	147	-4	4
4.	(Democratic Republic of the Congo) Arc-en-Ciel	3	0	3	68	122	-54	3

3 October 2005
15:00

Arc-en-Ciel (Democratic Republic of the Congo)	0–20	(Mozambique) ISPU
Scoring by quarter: n/a, n/a
Pts: n/a Rebs: n/a		Pts: n/a Rebs: n/a

3 October 2005
17:00

Boxscore

1º de Agosto (Angola)	66–64	(Nigeria) First Bank
Scoring by quarter: 17-24, 20-13, 15-17, 14-10
Pts: Nsimbo 22; Rebs: Nsimbo 10; Asts: Domitila 4		Pts: Mohammed 12; Rebs: Udoka 10; Asts: Iyorhe 2

4 October 2005
17:00

Boxscore

First Bank (Nigeria)	77–71	(Mozambique) ISPU
Pts: Akiode 21; Rebs: Udoka 20; Asts: Ojelabi 3		Pts: C.Silva, Amélia 22; Rebs: C.Silva 6 Asts: C.Silva 3

4 October 2005
21:00

1º de Agosto	20–0	(Democratic Republic of the Congo) Arc-en-Ciel
Scoring by quarter: n/a, n/a
Pts: n/a Rebs: n/a		Pts: n/a Rebs: n/a

5 October 2005
15:00

Boxscore

ISPU (Mozambique)	52–70	(Angola) 1º de Agosto
Pts: C.Silva 13; Rebs: Aleia 9 Asts: C.Silva 2		Pts: Nsimbo 26; Rebs: Nsimbo 18; Asts: Domitila 5

5 October 2005
21:00

Boxscore

First Bank (Nigeria)	82–68	(Democratic Republic of the Congo) Arc-en-Ciel
Pts: Akiode 18; Rebs: Mohammed 7 Asts: three players 2		Pts: Bopoli 27; Rebs: Bopoli 9 Asts: Nyama, Tshitshi 1

== Knockout stage ==
Quarter-finals
October 7, 15:00
(Ivory Coast) Abidjan BC	36
(Nigeria) First Bank	76
October 7, 17:00
(Democratic Republic of the Congo) Radi	56
(Angola) 1º de Agosto	80
October 7, 19:00
(Democratic Republic of the Congo) Arc-en-Ciel	63
(Mali) Djoliba	72
October 7, 21:00
(Mozambique) ISPU	89
(Gabon) Somo BB	43

5th-8th Place
October 8, 15:00
(Democratic Republic of the Congo) Arc-en-Ciel	55
(Ivory Coast) Abidjan BC	36
October 8, 21:00
(Democratic Republic of the Congo) Radi	75
(Gabon) Somo BB	54

5th place
October 9, 11:30
(Democratic Republic of the Congo) Arc-en-Ciel	71
(Democratic Republic of the Congo) Radi	45
7th place
October 9, 09:30
(Ivory Coast) Abidjan BC	60
(Gabon) Somo BB	56

Quarter-finals
October 7, 15:00
(Ivory Coast) Abidjan BC	36
(Nigeria) First Bank	76
October 7, 17:00
(Democratic Republic of the Congo) Radi	56
(Angola) 1º de Agosto	80
October 7, 19:00
(Democratic Republic of the Congo) Arc-en-Ciel	63
(Mali) Djoliba	72
October 7, 21:00
(Mozambique) ISPU	89
(Gabon) Somo BB	43

Semi-finals
October 8, 17:00
(Angola) 1º de Agosto	81
(Mozambique) ISPU	60
October 8, 19:00
(Mali) Djoliba	67
(Nigeria) First Bank	58

Final
October 9, 15:30
(Angola) 1º de Agosto	64
(Mali) Djoliba	73
Third place
October 9, 13:30
(Mozambique) ISPU	73
(Nigeria) First Bank	83

=== Quarter-finals ===
7 October 2005
15:00

Boxscore

Abidjan BC (Ivory Coast)	36–76	(Nigeria) First Bank
Pts: Youssouf, Diomande 8 Rebs: Youssouf 8 Asts: Youssouf 3		Pts: Ojelabi 21; Rebs: Mohammed 13; Asts: Iyorhe 4

7 October 2005
17:00

Boxscore

Radi (Democratic Republic of the Congo)	56–80	(Angola) 1º de Agosto
Pts: Bamati 13; Rebs: Kalundu 9 Asts: five players 1		Pts: Nsimbo 24; Rebs: Nsimbo 9 Asts: Domitila 4

7 October 2005
19:00

Boxscore

Arc-en-Ciel (Democratic Republic of the Congo)	63–72	(Mali) Djoliba
Pts: Nyama 26; Rebs: Nyama 17; Asts: Tshuina, Ndandu 2		Pts: Sininta 15; Rebs: Sininta 13; Asts: Drame 4

7 October 2005
21:00

Boxscore

ISPU (Mozambique)	89–43	(Gabon) Somo BB
Pts: Zinóbia 16; Rebs: Iracema 10; Asts: Zinóbia 4		Pts: Okome 13; Rebs: Okome 11; Asts: three players 1

=== 5th-8th place ===
8 October 2005
15:00

Boxscore

Arc-en-Ciel (Democratic Republic of the Congo)	55–36	(Ivory Coast) Abidjan BC
Pts: Bopoli, Kamin 11; Rebs: Nyama 10; Asts: Tshuina 3		Pts: Kone 16; Rebs: Abbady 9 Asts: Diomande 4

2 October 2005
21:00

Boxscore

Radi (Democratic Republic of the Congo)	75–54	(Gabon) Somo BB
Pts: Odimba 17; Rebs: Kalundu 10; Asts: Kalundu, Bamati 1		Pts: Mebyame 17; Rebs: Kopia 9 Asts: Nziengue, Ambouroue 1

=== Semifinals ===
8 October 2005
17:00

Boxscore

1º de Agosto (Angola)	81–60	(Mozambique) ISPU
Pts: Bárbara 21; Rebs: Nsimbo 14; Asts: Irene 3		Pts: Amélia 13; Rebs: Aleia 8 Asts: Tânia 1

8 October 2005
19:00

Boxscore

Djoliba (Mali)	67–58	(Nigeria) First Bank
Pts: K.Touré 13; Rebs: Sininta 11; Asts: F.Toure 4		Pts: Chukwuma 16; Rebs: Udoka 17; Asts: Iyorhe 4

=== 7th place ===
9 October 2005
09:30

Boxscore

Abidjan BC (Ivory Coast)	60–56	(Gabon) Somo BB
Pts: Kone 19; Rebs: Enan 15; Asts: four players 1		Pts: Mebyame 14; Rebs: Kopia 13; Asts: Mebyame 2

=== 5th place ===
9 October 2005
11:30

Boxscore

Arc-en-Ciel (Democratic Republic of the Congo)	71–45	(Democratic Republic of the Congo) Radi
Pts: Bopoli 21; Rebs: Nyama 8 Asts: Tshuina 2		Pts: Kalundu 14; Rebs: Kalundu 10; Asts: Bamati, Odimba 1

=== Bronze medal game ===
9 October 2005
13:30

Boxscore

ISPU (Mozambique)	73–83	(Nigeria) First Bank
Pts: C.Silva 19; Rebs: Gimo 7 Asts: Tânia 2		Pts: Ojelabi 21; Rebs: Mohammed 18; Asts: Chukwuma 3

=== Gold medal game ===
9 October 2005
15:30

Boxscore

1º de Agosto (Angola)	64–73	Djoliba
Scoring by quarter: 13-23, 22-16, 16-14, 13-20
Pts: Nsimbo 14; Rebs: Nsimbo 9 Asts: three players 1		Pts: Seremé 22; Rebs: Sininta 11; Asts: Sininta 6

== Final standings ==
Qualified for the 2007 FIBA Women's World League

Rank	Team	Record
Gold medal	(Mali) Djoliba AC	6–0
Silver medal	(Angola) Primeiro de Agosto	5–1
Bronze medal	(Nigeria) First Bank	3–3
4.	(Mozambique) ISPU	3–3
5.	(Democratic Republic of the Congo) Arc-en-Ciel	4–2
6.	(Democratic Republic of the Congo) Radi	2–4
7.	(Ivory Coast) Abidjan Basket Club	1–5
8.	(Gabon) Somo BB	0–6

Djoliba AC roster
Aminata Seremé, Aminata Sininta, Djenaba Samake, Djénébou Damba, Fanta Toure, Fatoumata Dia, Fatoumata Konate, Fatoumata Sanfo, Kadiatou Touré, Kadidiatou Drame, Mariama Camara, Meiya Tirera Coach: Mohamed Maïga

== All Tournament Team ==
2005 FIBA Africa Women's Clubs Champions Cup

Djoliba AC
1st Title

Most Valuable Player
(Democratic Republic of the Congo) Pauline Akonga-Nsimbo

== See also ==
- 2005 FIBA Africa Championship for Women
