= Mariame =

Mariame is a given name. Notable people with the name include:

- Mariame Clément (born 1974), French opera director
- Mariame Gbané (born 1982), Ivorian basketball player
- Mariame Kaba, American activist
- Mariame Kolga (born 1983), Ivorian basketball player
- Mariame Sylla (born 1986), Ivorian basketball player
