= 2006 FIBA Africa Women's Clubs Champions Cup squads =

This article displays the rosters for the participating teams at the 2006 FIBA Africa Club Championship for Women.

== (Ivory Coast) Abidjan Basket Club ==
Abidjan Basket Club – 2006 FIBA Africa Women's Clubs Champions Cup – 11th place roster
Players							Coaches
Pos	#	Nat	Name	Height	Weight	Age	Head Coach
	4	(Ivory Coast)	Maïmouna Coulibaly			29 July 1987 (aged 19)
	5	(Ivory Coast)	Brou N'Goran			4 May 1987 (aged 19)
	6	(Ivory Coast)	Mariam Gbane			16 April 1982 (aged 24)	Assistant coach(es)
	7	(Ivory Coast)	Adjheï Abbady			17 June 1987 (aged 19)
	9	(Ivory Coast)	Masouratou Youssouf			11 November 1984 (aged 21)
	10	(Ivory Coast)	Louise Ngoy Muadi			26 November 1985 (aged 20)
G	12	(Ivory Coast)	Aïchata Diomande	1.69		17 July 1984 (aged 22)
	13	(Ivory Coast)	Adjoua Kouadio			13 October 1981 (aged 25)
	14	(Ivory Coast)	Minata Fofana			22 March 1986 (aged 20)
	15	(Ivory Coast)	Mariame Sylla			20 March 1986 (aged 20)

== (Democratic Republic of the Congo) Arc-en-Ciel ==
Arc-en-Ciel – 2006 FIBA Africa Women's Clubs Champions Cup – 9th place roster
Players							Coaches
Pos	#	Nat	Name	Height	Weight	Age	Head Coach
	4	(Democratic Republic of the Congo)	Rukonkish Kamin			25 December 1979 (aged 26)
	5	(Democratic Republic of the Congo)	Tangama-Tshuina			30 June 1977 (aged 29)
	6	(Democratic Republic of the Congo)	Jeanine Kalombo			16 February 1984 (aged 22)	Assistant coach(es)
	7	(Democratic Republic of the Congo)	Wivine Lelo			8 November 1975 (aged 30)
	8	(Democratic Republic of the Congo)	Ilanga Tshitshi			14 April 1977 (aged 29)
	9	(Democratic Republic of the Congo)	Mbudi-Nkoko			1 July 1982 (aged 24)
	10	(Democratic Republic of the Congo)	Emilie Mozengo			23 June 1973 (aged 33)
	11	(Democratic Republic of the Congo)	Kalenga Ngoy			22 February 1982 (aged 24)
	12	(Democratic Republic of the Congo)	Laurence Odimba			4 April 1973 (aged 33)
	13	(Democratic Republic of the Congo)	Irene Nyama			28 November 1969 (aged 36)
	14	(Democratic Republic of the Congo)	Musau Kalundu			30 November 1977 (aged 28)
	15	(Democratic Republic of the Congo)	Micheline Ngobe			18 September 1978 (aged 28)

== (Mali) Djoliba ==
Djoliba – 2006 FIBA Africa Women's Clubs Champions Cup – 8th place roster
Players							Coaches
Pos	#	Nat	Name	Height	Weight	Age	Head Coach
	4	(Mali)	Nassira Traore			28 October 1988 (aged 18)
	5	(Mali)	Adja Ba			9 August 1975 (aged 31)
	6	(Mali)	Fatoumata Dia			26 January 1985 (aged 21)	Assistant coach(es)
	7	(Mali)	Kama Dembélé			8 October 1988 (aged 18)
G	8	(Mali)	Aminata Seremé	1.68 m (5 ft 6 in)		1 January 1984 (aged 22)
	9	(Mali)	Aminata Seck			2 April 1984 (aged 22)
	10	(Mali)	Fanta Toure			18 February 1989 (aged 17)
	11	(Mali)	Fanta Toure			18 February 1989 (aged 17)
	12	(Mali)	Djenaba Samake			22 August 1985 (aged 21)
	13	(Mali)	Aïssata Bore			12 June 1989 (aged 17)
	14	(Mali)	Aminata Diedhiou			5 May 1975 (aged 31)
	15	(Mali)	Minata Keita			15 March 1989 (aged 17)

== (Nigeria) Dolphins ==
Dolphins – 2006 FIBA Africa Women's Clubs Champions Cup – 12th place roster
Players							Coaches
Pos	#	Nat	Name	Height	Weight	Age	Head Coach
	4	(Nigeria)	Nkechi Akashili			22 February 1990 (aged 16)
	5	(Nigeria)	Ochunko Okworogun			3 July 1985 (aged 21)
	6	(Nigeria)	Juliet Ejogo			12 June 1990 (aged 16)	Assistant coach(es)
	7	(Nigeria)	Nkoyo George			30 April 1989 (aged 17)
	8	(Nigeria)	Esther Igben			1 April 1988 (aged 18)
	9	(Nigeria)	Shade Ogunsemoyin			10 October 1990 (aged 16)
	10	(Nigeria)	Chioma Nwoye			13 March 1988 (aged 18)
	11	(Nigeria)	Tinuke Arowosafe			25 September 1990 (aged 16)
	12	(Nigeria)	Peace Aliyu			22 November 1986 (aged 19)
	13	(Nigeria)	Julie Onyelugo			30 September 1987 (aged 19)
	14	(Nigeria)	Juliana Fuludu			26 April 1988 (aged 18)
	15	(Nigeria)	Temitope Ogunbodede			25 October 1989 (aged 17)

== (Mozambique) Ferroviário de Maputo ==
Ferroviário de Maputo – 2006 FIBA Africa Women's Clubs Champions Cup – Silver medal roster
Players							Coaches
Pos	#	Nat	Name	Height	Weight	Age	Head Coach
	4	(Mozambique)	Ana Azinheira			8 February 1977 (aged 29)
	5	(Mozambique)	Kátia Machai			16 November 1982 (aged 23)
	6	(Mozambique)	Zinóbia Machanguana			4 March 1977 (aged 29)	Assistant coach(es)
	7	(Mozambique)	Rute Muianga			6 April 1983 (aged 23)
	8	(Mozambique)	Janet Monteiro			2 February 1987 (aged 19)
	9	(Mozambique)	Nádia Rodrigues			8 April 1980 (aged 26)
	10	(Mozambique)	Nica Gemo			2 December 1982 (aged 23)
	11	(Mozambique)	Júlia Machalela			15 December 1975 (aged 30)
	12	(Mozambique)	Márcia Langa			3 December 1981 (aged 24)
	13	(Mozambique)	Deolinda Gimo			15 August 1987 (aged 19)
	15	(Mozambique)	Ondina Nhampossa			18 June 1979 (aged 27)

== (Nigeria) First Bank ==
First Bank – 2006 FIBA Africa Women's Clubs Champions Cup – Bronze medal roster
Players							Coaches
Pos	#	Nat	Name	Height	Weight	Age	Head Coach
	4	(Nigeria)	Bintu Bhadmus			10 November 1985 (aged 20)
	5	(Nigeria)	Nwamaka Adibeli			10 March 1985 (aged 21)
	6	(Nigeria)	Tamunomiete Whyte			28 May 1988 (aged 18)	Assistant coach(es)
	7	(Nigeria)	Oluchi Okorie			28 August 1981 (aged 25)
	8	(Nigeria)	Bianca Brown			3 November 1982 (aged 23)
	9	(Nigeria)	Catherine Nzekwe			14 August 1986 (aged 20)
	10	(Nigeria)	Tayelolu Adeniyi			23 March 1980 (aged 26)
G	11	(Nigeria) (United States)	Mobolaji Akiode	1.90 m (6 ft 3 in)	75 kg (165 lb)	12 May 1982 (aged 24)
	12	(Nigeria)	Martha Imoh			21 December 1989 (aged 16)
	13	(Nigeria)	Adeola Olanrewaju			12 January 1982 (aged 24)
	14	(Nigeria)	Priscilla Udeaja			29 June 1984 (aged 22)
	15	(Nigeria)	Ezinne James			22 June 1985 (aged 21)

== (Democratic Republic of the Congo) Hatari ==
Hatari – 2006 FIBA Africa Women's Clubs Champions Cup – 6th place roster
Players							Coaches
Pos	#	Nat	Name	Height	Weight	Age	Head Coach
	4	(Democratic Republic of the Congo)	Pierrette Mboyo-Ipema			5 July 1980 (aged 26)
	5	(Democratic Republic of the Congo)	Puati Ndandu			17 January 1984 (aged 22)
	6	(Democratic Republic of the Congo)	Olga Kaziama-Sengu			10 June 1980 (aged 26)	Assistant coach(es)
	7	(Democratic Republic of the Congo)	Kibinda Ndangi			26 March 1978 (aged 28)
F	8	(Democratic Republic of the Congo)	Cecile Nyoka	1.77 m (5 ft 9 1/2 in)		18 September 1986 (aged 20)
	9	(Democratic Republic of the Congo)	Aisha Ntumba			2 February 1987 (aged 19)
	10	(Democratic Republic of the Congo)	Kikwiki Munono			30 July 1979 (aged 27)
	11	(Democratic Republic of the Congo)	Youyou Mpinda-Ngolela			13 March 1984 (aged 22)
F	12	(Democratic Republic of the Congo)	Lisette Eyenga	1.78 m (5 ft 10 in)		6 September 1987 (aged 19)
	13	(Democratic Republic of the Congo)	Rachel Salima			30 March 1986 (aged 20)
	14	(Democratic Republic of the Congo)	Jolie Olingende			6 March 1980 (aged 26)
	15	(Democratic Republic of the Congo)	Mokaleba Manteka			13 November 1968 (aged 37)

== (Angola) Interclube ==
Interclube – 2006 FIBA Africa Women's Clubs Champions Cup – 4th place roster
Players							Coaches
Pos	#	Nat	Name	Height	Weight	Age	Head Coach
PG	4	(Angola)	Catarina Camufal	1.68 m (5 ft 6 in)	67 kg (148 lb)	30 March 1980 (aged 26)	(Angola) Apolinário Paquete
SF	5	(Angola)	Judith Queta	1.86 m (6 ft 1 in)		29 August 1985 (aged 21)
	6	(Angola)	Teresa Gonçalves			10 May 1981 (aged 25)	Assistant coach(es)
	7	(Angola)	Neusa Afonso			14 July 1982 (aged 24)
	8	(Angola)	Nádia Guimarães			8 January 1984 (aged 22)
	9	(Democratic Republic of the Congo)	Nelly Bopoli			16 July 1979 (aged 27)
	10	(Angola)	Celina da Conceição			5 April 1980 (aged 26)
	11	(Angola)	Irene Guerreiro			10 September 1970 (aged 36)
	12	(Angola)	Ana Machado			18 October 1976 (aged 30)
	13	(Democratic Republic of the Congo)	Rosada Ida			29 August 1981 (aged 25)
	14	(Angola)	Luísa Mouzinho			18 October 1980 (aged 26)
PF	15	(Angola)	Ngiendula Filipe	1.80 m (5 ft 11 in)	72 kg (159 lb)	20 May 1982 (aged 24)

== (Mozambique) ISPU ==
ISPU – 2006 FIBA Africa Women's Clubs Champions Cup – 7th place roster
Players							Coaches
Pos	#	Nat	Name	Height	Weight	Age	Head Coach
	4	(Mozambique)	Marta Gange			27 May 1984 (aged 22)
	5	(Mozambique)	Eduarda Chongo			3 September 1983 (aged 23)
	6	(Mozambique)	Tânia Wachena			15 December 1985 (aged 20)	Assistant coach(es)
	7	(Mozambique)	Ana Branquinho			2 February 1980 (aged 26)
	9	(Mozambique)	Amélia Macamo			23 September 1985 (aged 21)
	11	(Mozambique)	Aleia Rachide			23 January 1985 (aged 21)
	12	(Mozambique)	Vânia Filipe			4 September 1983 (aged 23)
	13	(Mozambique)	Vaneza Júnior			7 September 1986 (aged 20)
	14	(Mozambique)	Iracema Ndauane			19 October 1980 (aged 26)
	15	(Mozambique)	Nália Simão			22 May 1979 (aged 27)

== Kenya Ports Authority ==
Kenya Ports Authority – 2006 FIBA Africa Women's Clubs Champions Cup – 10th place roster
Players							Coaches
Pos	#	Nat	Name	Height	Weight	Age	Head Coach
	4	(Kenya)	Susan Anyango Okech			29 December 1982 (aged 23)
	5	(Kenya)	Mwajuma Makau			26 June 1980 (aged 26)
	6	(Kenya)	Carolyne Aratoh			25 October 1973 (aged 33)	Assistant coach(es)
	7	(Kenya)	Gladys Wanyama			3 April 1984 (aged 22)
	8	(Kenya)	Everlyne Olang			2 April 1987 (aged 19)
	9	(Kenya)	Fadya Said			13 September 1980 (aged 26)
	10	(Kenya)	Irene Murambi			24 January 1978 (aged 28)
	11	(Kenya)	Dorcas Anyango			26 May 1978 (aged 28)
	12	(Kenya)	Yvonne Odhiambo			26 February 1988 (aged 18)
	13	(Kenya)	Ethel Mdachi			29 July 1978 (aged 28)
	14	(Kenya)	Agnes Anyango			13 January 1978 (aged 28)
	15	(Kenya)	Miriam Obwong			6 October 1978 (aged 28)

== (Angola) Primeiro de Agosto ==
Primeiro de Agosto – 2006 FIBA Africa Women's Clubs Champions Cup – Gold medal roster
Players							Coaches
Pos	#	Nat	Name	Height	Weight	Age	Head Coach
	4	(Angola)	Sónia Guadalupe			15 September 1985 (aged 21)	(Angola) Higino Garcia
	5	(Angola)	Luísa Miguel	1.78 m (5 ft 10 in)		13 June 1975 (aged 31)
	6	(Angola)	Domitila Ventura			28 November 1978 (aged 27)	Assistant coach(es)
	7	(Angola)	Ângela Cardoso			9 April 1979 (aged 27)	(Angola) Eva Garcia
	8	(Angola)	Isabel Francisco			21 July 1980 (aged 26)
	9	(Angola)	Bárbara Guimarães			14 September 1980 (aged 26)
	10	(Angola)	Mariana Rafael			20 September 1981 (aged 25)
	11	(Angola)	Luísa Tomás			24 March 1983 (aged 23)
	12	(Angola)	Astrida Vicente			6 October 1978 (aged 28)
	13	(Democratic Republic of the Congo)	Bokomba Masela			27 September 1969 (aged 37)
	14	(Angola)	Ernestina Neto			6 November 1979 (aged 26)
	15	(Angola)	Jaquelina Francisco			16 March 1978 (aged 28)

== (Gabon) Somo BB ==
Somo BB – 2006 FIBA Africa Women's Clubs Champions Cup – 5th place roster
Players							Coaches
Pos	#	Nat	Name	Height	Weight	Age	Head Coach
	4	(Gabon)	Aline Etoubé			20 October 1977 (aged 29)
	5	(Gabon)	Bernice Ngoua			20 March 1984 (aged 22)
	6	(Gabon)	Synthia Benga			18 November 1978 (aged 27)	Assistant coach(es)
	7	(Gabon)	Ginette Olendé			28 December 1984 (aged 21)
	8	(Gabon)	Karine Mebyame			4 June 1987 (aged 19)
	9	(Democratic Republic of the Congo)	Jose Kanasi			22 April 1977 (aged 29)
	10	(Democratic Republic of the Congo)	Pauline Nsimbo			9 January 1982 (aged 24)
	11	(Gabon)	Marlène Fouty-Obasi			30 March 1982 (aged 24)
	12	(Gabon)	Lyla Sombo			2 February 1982 (aged 24)
	13	(Gabon)	Emilienne Nziengue			5 July 1984 (aged 22)
	14	(Gabon)	Julie Nkoma			2 June 1981 (aged 25)
	15	(Gabon)	Nelly Leyama			28 January 1975 (aged 31)
