= 2006 FIBA Africa Women's Clubs Champions Cup =

2006 FIBA Africa Champions Cup for Women
12th FIBA Africa Champions Cup for Women

Tournament details
- Host country: Gabon
- Dates: October 21 – 29
- Teams: 12 (from 53 federations)
- Venue: 1 (in 1 host city)

Final positions
- Champions: Angola (1º de Agosto's 1st title; Angola's 1st title)

Tournament statistics
- MVP: (Angola) Domitila Ventura
- Top scorer: (Democratic Republic of the Congo) Nsimbo 19.75
- Top rebounds: (Democratic Republic of the Congo) Nsimbo 8.25
- Top assists: (Nigeria) Aliyu 4.71
- PPG (Team): (Nigeria) First Bank 72.3
- RPG (Team): (Nigeria) First Bank 39.9
- APG (Team): (Mozambique) Ferroviário 15.4

Official website
- 2006 FIBA Africa Women's Clubs Champions Cup

The 2006 FIBA Africa Women's Clubs Champions Cup (12th edition), was an international basketball tournament held in Libreville, Gabon, from October 21 to 29, 2006. The tournament, organized by FIBA Africa and hosted by Somo BB, was contested by 12 clubs split into 2 groups of 6, the first four of which qualifying for the knock-out stage.

The tournament was won by Primeiro de Agosto from Angola.

== Draw ==
Group A	Group B
(Democratic Republic of the Congo) Arc-en-Ciel (Nigeria) First Bank (Angola) Interclube (Mozambique) ISPU; Kenya Ports Authority (Gabon) Somo BB	(Ivory Coast) Abidjan Basket Club (Mali) Djoliba (Nigeria) Dolphins (Mozambique) Ferroviário de Maputo (Democratic Republic of the Congo) Hatari (Angola) Primeiro de Agosto

== Preliminary rounds ==
Times given below are in UTC+1.

=== Group A ===
Qualified for the quarter-finals

	Team	M	W	L	PF	PA	Diff	P
1.	(Nigeria) First Bank	5	5	0	362	275	+87	10
2.	(Angola) Interclube	5	4	1	365	308	+57	9
3.	(Mozambique) ISPU	5	2	3	325	333	-8	7
4.	(Gabon) Somo BB	5	2	3	327	339	-12	7
5.	Kenya Ports Authority	5	2	3	287	330	−43	7
6.	(Democratic Republic of the Congo) Arc-en-Ciel	5	0	5	309	390	−81	5

21 October 2006
15:00

Boxscore

Interclube (Angola)	53–57	(Nigeria) First Bank
Scoring by quarter: 17-13, 11-13, 16-16, 9-15
Pts: Bopoli 12; Rebs: Bopoli, Ngiendula 9 Asts: Irene, Catarina 4		Pts: Akiode, James 10; Rebs: Udeaja 16; Asts: Bhadmus 3

21 October 2006
18:00

Boxscore

Somo BB (Gabon)	59–48	(Kenya) KPA
Scoring by quarter: 22-15, 11-8, 5-13, 21-12
Pts: Nsimbo 20; Rebs: Nsimbo 11; Asts: Mebyame 3		Pts: Aratoh 17; Rebs: Wanyama 12; Asts: Mdachi 4

22 October 2006
20:00

Boxscore

Arc-en-Ciel (Democratic Republic of the Congo)	60–74	(Mozambique) ISPU
Scoring by quarter: 25-24, 14-19, 9-18, 12-13
Pts: Odimba 12; Rebs: Nyama 7 Asts: Ngoy 3		Pts: Amélia 26; Rebs: Iracema 12; Asts: Branquinho 4

23 October 2006
10:00

Boxscore

KPA (Kenya)	62–57	(Mozambique) ISPU
Scoring by quarter: 6-8, 22-21, 16-9, 18-19
Pts: Obwong 26; Rebs: Wanyama 13; Asts: Anyango 5		Pts: Amélia 22; Rebs: Nália 11; Asts: Amélia, Branquinho 4

23 October 2006
14:00

Boxscore

Interclube (Angola)	73–61	(Democratic Republic of the Congo) Arc-en-Ciel
Scoring by quarter: 21-12, 11-21, 20-16, 21-12
Pts: Ngiendula 15; Rebs: Bopoli 9 Asts: Catarina, T.Gonçalves 3		Pts: Kalundu 22; Rebs: Lelo 7 Asts: Tshuina 5

23 October 2006
18:00

Boxscore

First Bank (Nigeria)	68–64	(Gabon) Somo BB
Scoring by quarter: 17-19, 19-16, 19-13, 13-16
Pts: Udeaja 10; Rebs: three players 10; Asts: Brown 6		Pts: Nsimbo 29; Rebs: Nsimbo 9 Asts: Kanasi 5

24 October 2006
16:00

Boxscore

KPA (Kenya)	63–84	(Angola) Interclube
Scoring by quarter: 19-21, 17-20, 13-26, 14-17
Pts: Aratoh 17; Rebs: Wanyama 8 Asts: Said 3		Pts: T.Gonçalves 19; Rebs: Bopoli 14; Asts: T.Gonçalves 6

24 October 2006
18:00

Boxscore

Somo BB (Gabon)	62–71	(Mozambique) ISPU
Scoring by quarter: 18-22, 13-14, 12-19, 19-16
Pts: Sombo 21; Rebs: Sombo 10; Asts: Nsimbo 4		Pts: Branquinho 16; Rebs: Tânia, Iracema 6 Asts: Tânia 5

24 October 2006
20:00

Boxscore

First Bank (Nigeria)	94–55	(Democratic Republic of the Congo) Arc-en-Ciel
Scoring by quarter: 20-12, 33-6, 13-21, 28-16
Pts: Akiode 20; Rebs: Udeaja 13; Asts: Whyte 5		Pts: Nkoko 15; Rebs: Nyama, Kalundu 5 Asts: Ngobe, Ngoy 2

25 October 2006
12:00

Boxscore

First Bank (Nigeria)	70–42	(Kenya) KPA
Scoring by quarter: 14-10, 13-7, 27-10, 16-15
Pts: Akiode 18; Rebs: Olanrewaju 9 Asts: Brown, Whyte 4		Pts: Obwong 12; Rebs: Wanyama 14; Asts: Obwong 5

25 October 2006
16:00

Boxscore

ISPU (Mozambique)	62–76	(Angola) Interclube
Scoring by quarter: 15-16, 18-14, 12-21, 17-25
Pts: Amélia 29; Rebs: Iracema 10; Asts: Amélia 3		Pts: Ilda 13; Rebs: Bopoli 13; Asts: Catarina 5

25 October 2006
18:00

Boxscore

Arc-en-Ciel (Democratic Republic of the Congo)	73–77	(Gabon) Somo BB
Scoring by quarter: 14-14, 21-22, 22-20, 16-21
Pts: Tshuina 23; Rebs: Nyama 10; Asts: Tshuina 6		Pts: Kanasi 21; Rebs: Nsimbo 16; Asts: Kanasi 4

26 October 2006
10:00

Boxscore

ISPU (Mozambique)	61–73	(Nigeria) First Bank
Scoring by quarter: 18-26, 11-20, 19-15, 13-12
Pts: Amélia 17; Rebs: Amélia, Iracema 7 Asts: Amélia 4		Pts: Akiode 18; Rebs: Udeaja, Olanrewaju 13; Asts: Brown 5

26 October 2006
12:00

Boxscore

Arc-en-Ciel (Democratic Republic of the Congo)	60–72	(Kenya) KPA
Scoring by quarter: 19-27, 12-11, 13-13, 16-21
Pts: Kamin 17; Rebs: Nyama, Kalundu 7 Asts: Nkoko 3		Pts: Murambi 15; Rebs: Obwong 8 Asts: Obwong, Makau 3

26 October 2006
18:00

Boxscore

Somo BB (Gabon)	65–79	(Angola) Interclube
Scoring by quarter: 13-25, 16-20, 17-17, 19-17
Pts: Kanasi 28; Rebs: Nsimbo 12; Asts: Mebyame 4		Pts: Bopoli 18; Rebs: Bopoli 11; Asts: Catarina 4

=== Group B ===
Qualified for the quarter-finals

	Team	M	W	L	PF	PA	Diff	P
1.	(Angola) Primeiro de Agosto	5	5	0	288	249	+39	10
2.	(Mozambique) Ferroviário de Maputo	5	4	1	340	269	+71	9
3.	(Mali) Djoliba	5	2	3	290	313	-23	7
4.	(Democratic Republic of the Congo) ASB Hatari	5	2	3	274	276	-2	7
5.	(Ivory Coast) Abidjan Basket Club	5	2	3	230	257	-27	7
6.	(Nigeria) Dolphins	5	0	5	303	361	-58	5

21 October 2006
15:00

Boxscore

Djoliba (Mali)	47–56	(Ivory Coast) Abidjan BC
Scoring by quarter: 15-16, 13-13, 11-15, 8-12
Pts: Dia 16; Rebs: Toure, Keita 6 Asts: Toure 5		Pts: Muadi 18; Rebs: Youssouf, Abbady 10; Asts: Youssouf

22 October 2006
16:00

Boxscore

1º de Agosto (Angola)	61–53	(Nigeria) Dolphins
Scoring by quarter: 14-12, 15-14, 15-14, 17-13
Pts: Domitila 14; Rebs: L.Tomás 9 Asts: Domitila 4		Pts: Okworogun 11; Rebs: Onyelugo 10; Asts: Aliyu 5

22 October 2006
18:00

Boxscore

ASB Hatari (Democratic Republic of the Congo)	47–59	(Mozambique) Fer Maputo
Scoring by quarter: 11-22, 12-11, 12-18, 12-8
Pts: Munono 13; Rebs: Olingende 10; Asts: Ntumba 5		Pts: Gimo 9 Rebs: Zinóbia 6 Asts: Ntumba 5

23 October 2006
12:00

Boxscore

Djoliba (Mali)	76–74	(Nigeria) Dolphins
Scoring by quarter: 21-13, 16-22, 15-18, 24-21
Pts: Toure, Dia 19; Rebs: Keita 10; Asts: Ba 4		Pts: Ejogo 15; Rebs: Arowosafe 6 Asts: Aliyu 8

23 October 2006
16:00

Boxscore

Abidjan BC	38–55	(Mozambique) Fer Maputo
Scoring by quarter: 4-10, 13-15, 8-21, 13-9
Pts: Diomande 9 Rebs: Abbady, N'Goran 6 Asts: Youssouf 3		Pts: Nica 12; Rebs: Nica 13; Asts: Márcia 4

23 October 2006
20:00

Boxscore

1º de Agosto (Angola)	59–57	(Democratic Republic of the Congo) ASB Hatari
Scoring by quarter: 16-15, 14-7, 16-19, 13-16
Pts: Domitila 17; Rebs: Astrida 6 Asts: Domitila 3		Pts: Olingende 11; Rebs: Olingende 8 Asts: Eyenga 5

24 October 2006
10:00

Boxscore

Djoliba (Mali)	55–71	(Mozambique) Fer Maputo
Scoring by quarter: 16-18, 6-14, 17-17, 16-22
Pts: Dia 12; Rebs: Bore 5 Asts: Dia, Toure 3		Pts: Azinheira 20; Rebs: Nica 14; Asts: Zinóbia 5

24 October 2006
12:00

Boxscore

Abidjan BC (Ivory Coast)	43–48	(Angola) 1º de Agosto
Scoring by quarter: 7-5, 8-8, 14-18, 14-17
Pts: Diomande 15; Rebs: Abbady 10; Asts: Gbane 2		Pts: three players 10; Rebs: Bárbara 7 Asts: Bárbara 3

24 October 2006
14:00

Boxscore

Dolphins (Nigeria)	56–62	(Democratic Republic of the Congo) ASB Hatari
Scoring by quarter: 13-10, 14-15, 14-21, 15-16
Pts: Arowosafe, Nwoye 8 Rebs: Fuludu 7 Asts: Okworogun 3		Pts: Munono 19; Rebs: Olingende 17; Asts: Nyoka 3

25 October 2006
10:00

Boxscore

Dolphins (Nigeria)	57–66	(Ivory Coast) Abidjan BC
Scoring by quarter: 14-15, 16-19, 9-18, 18-14
Pts: Arowosafe 14; Rebs: Arowosafe 9 Asts: Aliyu 3		Pts: Youssouf 20; Rebs: Youssouf 12; Asts: Diomande 4

25 October 2006
14:00

Boxscore

Fer Maputo (Mozambique)	59–66	(Angola) 1º de Agosto
Scoring by quarter: 10-16, 7-10, 17-10, 25-30
Pts: Azinheira 20; Rebs: Gimo 9 Asts: Janet, Zinóbia 3		Pts: Astrida 22; Rebs: L.Miguel, Jaquelina 7 Asts: Domitila 5

25 October 2006
20:00

Boxscore

ASB Hatari (Democratic Republic of the Congo)	58–75	(Mali) Djoliba
Scoring by quarter: 19-19, 18-23, 17-14, 4-19
Pts: Munono 19; Rebs: Munono 10; Asts: Ipema 5		Pts: Dia 23; Rebs: Samake 6 Asts: Ba 5

26 October 2006
14:00

Boxscore

Fer Maputo (Mozambique)	96–63	(Nigeria) Dolphins
Scoring by quarter: 22-8, 27-11, 21-17, 26-27
Pts: Azinheira 32; Rebs: Nica 11; Asts: Nádia 7		Pts: Nwoye 15; Rebs: Onyelugo 7 Asts: Aliyu 7

26 October 2006
16:00

Boxscore

ASB Hatari (Democratic Republic of the Congo)	50–27	(Ivory Coast) Abidjan BC
Scoring by quarter: 9-4, 10-5, 18-11, 13-7
Pts: Munono 18; Rebs: Munono 13; Asts: Olingende 4		Pts: Muadi 8 Rebs: Abbady 8 Asts: Muadi 2

26 October 2006
20:00

Boxscore

Djoliba (Mali)	37–54	(Angola) 1º de Agosto
Scoring by quarter: 10-18, 8-8, 7-19, 12-9
Pts: Dia 12; Rebs: Keita 5 Asts: Dia 2		Pts: Ernestina 14; Rebs: Jaquelina 10; Asts: three players 2

9th-12th Place
October 27 - 10:00
(Nigeria) Dolphins	81
(Kenya) KPA	91
October 27 - 12:00
(Democratic Republic of the Congo) Arc-en-Ciel	52
(Ivory Coast) Abidjan BC	45

9th place
October 28 - 12:00
(Kenya) KPA	66
(Democratic Republic of the Congo) Arc-en-Ciel	73
11th place
October 28 - 10:00
(Nigeria) Dolphins	61
(Ivory Coast) Abidjan BC	77

Quarter-finals
October 27 - 14:00
(Democratic Republic of the Congo) ASB Hatari	39
(Nigeria) First Bank	65
October 27 - 16:00
(Gabon) SOMO BB	45
(Angola) 1º de Agosto	63
October 27 - 18:00
(Mali) Djoliba	44
(Angola) Interclube	66
October 27 - 20:00
(Mozambique) ISPU	68
(Mozambique) Fer Maputo	73

5th-8th Place
October 27 - 14:00
(Democratic Republic of the Congo) Hatari	49
(Mozambique) ISPU	42
October 28 - 16:00
(Gabon) SOMO BB	71
(Mali) Djoliba	64

5th place
November 29
(Democratic Republic of the Congo) Hatari	61
(Gabon) SOMO BB	72
7th place
November 29
(Mozambique) ISPU	65
(Mali) Djoliba	59

Quarter-finals
October 27 - 14:00
(Democratic Republic of the Congo) ASB Hatari	39
(Nigeria) First Bank	65
October 27 - 16:00
(Gabon) SOMO BB	45
(Angola) 1º de Agosto	63
October 27 - 18:00
(Mali) Djoliba	44
(Angola) Interclube	66
October 27 - 20:00
(Mozambique) ISPU	68
(Mozambique) Fer Maputo	73

Semi-finals
October 28 - 18:00
(Nigeria) First Bank	65
(Mozambique) Fer Maputo	73
October 28 - 20:00
(Angola) 1º de Agosto	83
(Angola) Interclube	44

Final
October 29 - 19:00
(Mozambique) Fer Maputo	74
(Angola) 1º de Agosto	86
Third place
October 29 - 17:00
(Nigeria) First Bank	86
(Angola) Interclube	81

=== 9th-12th place ===
27 October 2006
10:00

Boxscore

Dolphins (Nigeria)	81–91	(Kenya) KPA
Scoring by quarter: 17-23, 16-30, 20-18, 28-20
Pts: Ejogo 19; Rebs: Onyelugo 6 Asts: Aliyu 6		Pts: Wanyama 29; Rebs: Wanyama 8 Asts: Anyango 5

27 October 2006
12:00

Boxscore

Arc-en-Ciel (Democratic Republic of the Congo)	52–45	(Ivory Coast) Abidjan BC
Scoring by quarter: 10-8, 15-12, 15-7, 12-18
Pts: Kamin 15; Rebs: Nyama 11; Asts: Lelo 5		Pts: three players 9 Rebs: Youssouf 8 Asts: Gbane 5

=== Quarter finals ===
27 October 2006
14:00

Boxscore

ASB Hatari (Democratic Republic of the Congo)	39–65	(Nigeria) First Bank
Scoring by quarter: 8-19, 11-14, 7-15, 13-17
Pts: Munono 11; Rebs: Manteka 7 Asts: Ndandu 2		Pts: Akiode 11; Rebs: Olanrewaju 8 Asts: Adibeli 5

27 October 2006
16:00

Boxscore

SOMO BB (Gabon)	45–63	(Angola) 1º de Agosto
Scoring by quarter: 8-16, 15-18, 10-16, 12-13
Pts: Kanasi 17; Rebs: Sombo 18; Asts: Nsimbo, Ngoua 2		Pts: Bárbara 17; Rebs: Ângela 8 Asts: Bárbara, I.Francisco 4

27 October 2006
18:00

Boxscore

Djoliba (Mali)	44–66	(Angola) Interclube
Scoring by quarter: 13-14, 6-17, 9-18, 16-17
Pts: Seremé 10; Rebs: four players 5 Asts: Seremé 2		Pts: Bopoli 14; Rebs: Ngiendula 10; Asts: Catarina, Ilda 3

27 October 2006
20:00

Boxscore

ISPU (Mozambique)	68–73	Fer Maputo
Scoring by quarter: 10-22, 19-17, 22-14, 17-20
Pts: Amélia, Tânia 19; Rebs: Iracema 8 Asts: Aleia, Branquinho 3		Pts: Gimo 22; Rebs: Gimo 12; Asts: Zinóbia 6

=== 11th place ===
28 October 2006
10:00

Boxscore

Dolphins (Nigeria)	61–77	(Ivory Coast) Abidjan BC
Scoring by quarter: 14-16, 18-23, 8-20, 21-18
Pts: Ejogo 21; Rebs: Ogunbodede 8 Asts: Igben 3		Pts: Diomande 22; Rebs: Youssouf 8 Asts: Youssouf 7

=== 9th place ===
28 October 2006
12:00

Boxscore

KPA (Kenya)	66–73 (OT)	(Democratic Republic of the Congo) Arc-en-Ciel
Scoring by quarter: 16-14, 11-12, 19-13, 11-18, Overtime: 9-16
Pts: Wanyama 26; Rebs: Aratoh 8 Asts: Anyango 4		Pts: Tshuina 27; Rebs: Kalundu 9 Asts: four players 1

=== 5th-8th place ===
28 October 2006
14:00

Boxscore

Hatari (Democratic Republic of the Congo)	49–42	(Mozambique) ISPU
Scoring by quarter: 6-8, 13-6, 7-15, 23-13
Pts: Munono 23; Rebs: Munono 11; Asts: Eyenga 4		Pts: Aleia 13; Rebs: Aleia 4 Asts: Branquinho 4

27 October 2006
16:00

Boxscore

SOMO BB (Gabon)	71–64	(Mali) Djoliba
Scoring by quarter: 22-10, 16-18, 16-10, 17-26
Pts: Nsimbo 25; Rebs: Sombo 20; Asts: Ngoua 5		Pts: Dia 23; Rebs: Bore, Keita 6 Asts: Bore, Ba 2

=== Semifinals ===
28 October 2006
18:00

Boxscore

First Bank (Nigeria)	65–73	(Mozambique) Fer Maputo
Scoring by quarter: 19-26, 16-15, 17-15, 13-17
Pts: Olanrewaju 22; Rebs: Olanrewaju 7 Asts: four players 1		Pts: Azinheira 17; Rebs: Gimo 14; Asts: Zinóbia 6

28 October 2006
20:00

Boxscore

1º de Agosto (Angola)	83–44	(Angola) Interclube
Scoring by quarter: 19-11, 17-7, 28-8, 19-18
Pts: Domitila 21; Rebs: Jaquelina 8 Asts: Domitila 4		Pts: Catarina, Ilda 10; Rebs: Irene 6 Asts: Irene 3

=== 7th place ===
29 October 2006
13:00

Boxscore

ISPU (Mozambique)	65–59	(Mali) Djoliba
Scoring by quarter: 18-26, 12-11, 16-11, 19-11
Pts: Iracema 16; Rebs: Aleia 11; Asts: Tânia, Branquinho 4		Pts: Sacko 10; Rebs: Samake 7 Asts: Dia 4

=== 5th place ===
29 October 2006
15:00

Boxscore

ASB Hatari (Democratic Republic of the Congo)	61–72	(Gabon) SOMO BB
Scoring by quarter: 9-16, 18-14, 17-21, 17-21
Pts: Eyenga 22; Rebs: Munono 16; Asts: Eyenga, Sengu 4		Pts: Nsimbo 23; Rebs: Sombo 12; Asts: Kanasi 3

=== Bronze medal game ===
29 October 2006
17:00

Boxscore

First Bank (Nigeria)	86–81	(Angola) Interclube
Scoring by quarter: 22-24, 16-17, 29-12, 19-28
Pts: Olanrewaju 27; Rebs: Olanrewaju 10; Asts: Brown 5		Pts: three players 14; Rebs: Judith 9 Asts: Ilda 9

=== Gold medal game ===
29 October 2006
19:00

Boxscore

Fer Maputo (Mozambique)	74–86 (OT)	(Angola) 1º de Agosto
Scoring by quarter: 9-15, 23-17, 15-13, 21-23, Overtime: 6-18
Pts: Gimo, Machalela 18; Rebs: Gimo 10; Asts: Janet, Zinóbia 5		Pts: Astrida 19; Rebs: Astrida, L.Tomás 6 Asts: Domitila 5

== Final standings ==
Rank	Team	Record
Gold medal	(Angola) Primeiro de Agosto	8–0
Silver medal	(Mozambique) Ferroviário de Maputo	7–1
Bronze medal	(Nigeria) First Bank	7–1
4	(Angola) Interclube	5–3
5	(Gabon) Somo BB	4–4
6	(Democratic Republic of the Congo) ASB Hatari	3–5
7	(Mozambique) ISPU	3–5
8	(Mali) Djoliba AC	2–6
9	(Democratic Republic of the Congo) Arc-en-Ciel	2–5
10	Kenya Ports Authority	3–4
11	(Ivory Coast) Abidjan Basket Club	3–4
12	(Nigeria) Dolphins	0–7

Primeiro de Agosto roster
Ângela Cardoso, Astrida Vicente, Bárbara Guimarães, Bokomba Masela, Domitila Ventura, Ernestina Neto, Isabel Francisco, Jaquelina Francisco, Luísa Miguel, Luísa Tomás, Mariana Rafael, Sónia Guadalupe, Coach: Higino Garcia

== All Tournament Team ==
2006 FIBA Africa Women's Clubs Champions Cup

Clube Desportivo Primeiro de Agosto
1st Title

Most Valuable Player
(Angola) Domitila Ventura

== See also ==
- 2007 FIBA Africa Championship for Women
