= Moroccan League =

Moroccan League may refer to:

- Botola, Morocco's top-tier professional football league
- Botola 2, Morocco's second-tier football league
- Amateur National Championship (Moroccan football), Morocco's third-tier football league
- Division Excellence, men's basketball league

== See also ==
- Sport in Morocco
- Moroccan football league system
- Moroccan football league 1922–1956
- Royal Moroccan Football Federation 1957–
- Moroccan Royal Basketball Federation
