= 2004 FIBA Africa Under-18 Championship for Women squads =

2004 FIBA Africa U-18 Championship for Women squads

This article displays the rosters for the participating teams at the 2004 FIBA Africa Under-18 Championship for Women.

== Angola ==
Angola women's national U18 basketball team – 2004 FIBA Africa Championship – 4th place roster
Players
Coaches

| Pos. | No. | Name | Age – Date of birth | Height | Club | Ctr. |
|---|---|---|---|---|---|---|
| | 4 | Eva Silva | 18 – 22 December 1986 |
| | 5 | Catarina Eusébio | 16 – 11 September 1988 |
| | 6 | Vera João | 18 – 7 November 1986 |
| | 7 | Marta Perestrelo | 18 – 28 January 1986 |
| | 8 | Marisa Nsiame | 18 – 9 September 1986 |
| | 9 | Samba Eduardo | 17 – 26 January 1987 |
| | 10 | Solange Bumba | 18 – 7 September 1986 |
| | 11 | Nadir Manuel | 18 – 30 November 1986 |
| | 12 | Vera Miguel | 18 – 17 April 1986 |
| | 13 | Guiomar Mizalaque | 17 – 14 October 1987 |
| | 14 | Angelina Golome | 16 – 23 March 1988 |
| | 15 | Cláudia António | 18 – 27 May 1986 |

Head coach

Assistant coach

Legend

- (C) Team captain
- nat field describes country

== Central African Republic ==
Central African Republic women's national U18 basketball team – 2004 FIBA Africa Championship – 7th place roster
Players
Coaches

| Pos. | No. | Name | Age – Date of birth | Height | Club | Ctr. |
|---|---|---|---|---|---|---|
| | 4 | Flavie Komokoli | 15 – 12 September 1989 |
| | 5 | Jasmine Ngallo | 16 – 17 August 1988 |
| | 6 | Maureene Kotta | 14 – 16 December 1990 |
| | 7 | Princesse Ndack | 16 – 25 June 1988 |
| | 8 | Romy Balcilia | 16 – 27 April 1988 |
| | 9 | Lisa Madozein | 15 – 22 June 1989 |
| | 10 | Claudie Kokito | 16 – 11 November 1988 |
| | 11 | Marie Kengoua | 17 – 26 October 1987 |
| | 13 | Abety Imbangueret | 15 – 22 January 1989 |
| | 15 | Kodjo Eloumta | 16 – 22 February 1988 |

Head coach

Assistant coach

Legend

- (C) Team captain
- Club field describes current club

== (Democratic Republic of the Congo) DR Congo ==
DR Congo women's national U18 basketball team – 2004 FIBA Africa Championship – Silver Medal roster
Players
Coaches

| Pos. | No. | Name | Age – Date of birth | Height | Club | Ctr. |
|---|---|---|---|---|---|---|
| G | 4 | Flavie Ngono | 18 – 4 July 1986 | 1.69 m (5 ft 7 in) |
| G | 5 | Armelie Kalonda | 16 – 30 March 1988 | 1.72 m (5 ft 8 in) |
| | 6 | Ngoma Nzau | 16 – 8 October 1988 |
| F | 7 | Diane Mabibi | 16 – 28 November 1988 | 1.77 m (5 ft 10 in) |
| C | 8 | Chanelle Modiri | 16 – 13 October 1988 | 1.90 m (6 ft 3 in) |
| F | 9 | Lisette Eyenga | 17 – 6 September 1987 | 1.78 m (5 ft 10 in) |
| | 10 | Matuka Makambo | 16 – 27 August 1988 |
| C | 11 | Marie Kitoko | 18 – 8 April 1986 | 1.83 m (6 ft 0 in) |
| C | 12 | Betty Tshiniangu | 17 – 5 January 1987 | 1.84 m (6 ft 0 in) |
| F | 13 | Sandra Ileki | 17 – 27 May 1987 | 1.79 m (5 ft 10 in) |
| C | 14 | Mireille Tshiyoyo | 16 – 25 November 1988 | 1.84 m (6 ft 0 in) |
| | 15 | Nadine Mikemo | 16 – 30 October 1988 |

Head coach

Assistant coach

Legend

- (C) Team captain
- Club field describes current club

== Mali ==
Mali women's national U18 basketball team – 2004 FIBA Africa Championship – 6th place roster
Players
Coaches

| Pos. | No. | Name | Age – Date of birth | Height | Club | Ctr. |
|---|---|---|---|---|---|---|
| | 4 | Kama Dembélé | 16 – 8 October 1988 |
| | 5 | Kadia Sacko | 16 – 25 April 1988 |
| | 6 | Haoua Kane | 17 – 13 November 1987 |
| | 7 | Fatoumata Sanfo | 18 – 24 February 1986 |
| | 8 | Malado Bore | 17 – 8 November 1987 |
| | 9 | Fatoumata Bagayoko | 16 – 23 May 1988 | 1.70 m (5 ft 7 in) |
| | 10 | Fanta Toure | 15 – 18 February 1989 |
| | 11 | Djénébou Sidibe | 16 – 20 May 1988 |
| | 12 | Fatoumata Konate | 18 – 10 April 1986 |
| | 13 | Aïssata Bore | 15 – 12 June 1989 |
| | 14 | Meiya Tireira | 18 – 15 April 1986 | 1.87 m (6 ft 2 in) |
| | 15 | Hawa Coulibaly | 16 – 15 July 1988 |

Head coach

Assistant coach

Legend

- (C) Team captain
- Club field describes current club

== Mozambique ==
Mozambique women's national U18 basketball team – 2004 FIBA Africa Championship – Bronze Medal roster
Players
Coaches

| Pos. | No. | Name | Age – Date of birth | Height | Club | Ctr. |
|---|---|---|---|---|---|---|
| | 4 | Filomena Micato | 18 – 26 January 1986 | 1.68 m (5 ft 6 in) |
| | 5 | Jossefina Jafar | 18 – 26 September 1986 |
| | 6 | Didian Suela | 18 – 7 December 1986 |
| | 7 | Nádia Zucule | 17 – 15 February 1987 |
| | 8 | Janet Monteiro | 17 – 2 February 1987 |
| | 9 | Anabela Cossa | 18 – 7 April 1986 | 1.72 m (5 ft 8 in) |
| | 10 | Vaneza Júnior | 18 – 7 September 1986 |
| | 11 | Iyara Manhique | 18 – 10 July 1986 |
| | 12 | Ilda Chambe | 17 – 19 April 1987 |
| | 13 | Cláudia Chembene | 18 – 1 August 1986 |
| | 14 | Nádia Rosário | 18 – 14 May 1986 |
| | 15 | Deolinda Gimo | 17 – 15 August 1987 | 1.90 m (6 ft 3 in) |

Head coach

Assistant coach

Legend

- (C) Team captain
- Club field describes current club

== South Africa ==
South Africa women's national U18 basketball team – 2004 FIBA Africa Championship – 5th place roster
Players
Coaches

| Pos. | No. | Name | Age – Date of birth | Height | Club | Ctr. |
|---|---|---|---|---|---|---|
| | 4 | Sherri McIntosh | 18 – 29 September 1986 |
| | 5 | Kgaugelo Phiri | 17 – 11 May 1987 |
| | 6 | Nathaly September | 18 – 3 February 1986 |
| | 7 | Adele Johnson | 18 – 1 March 1986 |
| | 8 | Gontse Molantoa | 18 – 20 April 1986 |
| | 9 | Phuti Mosehlana | 15 – 31 May 1989 |
| | 10 | Ellen Moutlwatse | 18 – 27 February 1986 |
| | 11 | Khanyisile Zondi | 18 – 20 March 1986 |
| | 12 | Margaret Ntoi | 16 – 20 January 1988 |
| | 13 | Itumeleng Khoabane | 17 – 16 August 1987 |
| | 14 | Bervelly Mabuya | 17 – 14 June 1987 |
| | 15 | Gabisile Ndlangamandla | 17 – 21 February 1987 |

Head coach

Assistant coach

Legend

- (C) Team captain
- Club field describes current club

== Tunisia ==
Tunisia women's national U18 basketball team – 2004 FIBA Africa Championship - Gold Medal roster
Players
Coaches

| Pos. | No. | Name | Age – Date of birth | Height | Club | Ctr. |
|---|---|---|---|---|---|---|
| G | 4 | Olfa Ouerghi | 18 – 26 January 1986 | 1.76 m (5 ft 9 in) |
| F | 5 | Samah Grioui | 16 – 28 January 1988 | 1.78 m (5 ft 10 in) |
| G | 6 | Nedra Dhouibi | 17 – 3 September 1987 | 1.72 m (5 ft 8 in) |
| C | 7 | Mariem Ouertani | 17 – 10 November 1987 | 1.88 m (6 ft 2 in) |
| F | 8 | Hajer Hafsi | 17 – 29 January 1987 | 1.77 m (5 ft 10 in) |
| G | 9 | Saousen Jebali | 18 – 12 January 1986 | 1.69 m (5 ft 7 in) |
| F | 10 | Mouna Ghalleb | 17 – 14 January 1987 | 1.70 m (5 ft 7 in) |
| C | 11 | Fatma Mahmoud | 17 – 30 January 1987 | 1.80 m (5 ft 11 in) |
| F | 12 | Maroua Boumenjel | 16 – 12 June 1988 | 1.77 m (5 ft 10 in) |
| F | 13 | Emna Jlida | 16 – 25 March 1988 | 1.75 m (5 ft 9 in) |
| C | 14 | Selma M'Nasria | 18 – 11 October 1986 | 1.90 m (6 ft 3 in) |
| C | 15 | Fatma Jouini | 17 – 28 February 1987 | 1.83 m (6 ft 0 in) |

Head coach

Assistant coach

Legend

- (C) Team captain
- Club field describes current club

== See also ==
- 2005 FIBA Africa Championship for Women squads
