= Rosângela =

Rosângela is a female given name of Portuguese origin. It is a compound name formed by combining Rosa ("rose") and Ângela ("angel"). Notable people with the name include:

- Rosângela Conceição (born 1973), Brazilian wrestling, judo and jiu-jitsu practitioner
- Rosângela Gomes (born 1966), Brazilian politician
- Rosângela Lagos (born 1980), Cape Verdean basketball player
- Rosângela Matheus (born 1963), Brazilian politician
- Rosângela Rennó (born 1962), Brazilian artist
- Rosângela Santos (born 1990), Brazilian sprinter
- Rosângela Lula da Silva (born 1966), First Lady of Brazil since 2023

== See also ==
- Rosangela, orthographic variant or Italian and Spanish spelling
