= Gbané =

Gbané is a surname. Notable people with the surname include:

- Mariame Gbané (born 1982), Ivorian basketball player
- Roman Mory Gbane (born 2000), Ivorian footballer
- Seydou Gbané (born 1992), Ivorian taekwondo practitioner
