= Morocco women's national basketball team =

Morocco
- FIBA ranking: NR (14 September 2026)
- Joined FIBA: 1936
- FIBA zone: FIBA Africa
- National federation: Moroccan Royal Basketball Federation

AfroBasket
- Appearances: 1

The Morocco women's national basketball team represents the Morocco in international competitions. It is administered by the Moroccan Royal Basketball Federation.

== AfroBasket record ==
- 2000 – 4th place
