= Rosangela =

Rosangela is a female given name of Italian and Spanish origin, or an orthographic variation of the Portuguese female given name Rosângela. The name is compounded by combining Rosa ("rose") and Angela ("angel"). Notable people with the name include:

- Rosangela Bessi (born 1972), Italian model and TV personality
- Rosangela Abreu Crespo (born 1983), Puerto Rican singer
- Rosangela Moro (born 1974), Brazilian politician

== See also ==
- Rosângela, a Portuguese variant spelling
