= 1999 FIBA Africa Under-18 Championship for Women =

1999 FIBA U18 Women's AfroBasket
5th FIBA Under-18 Women's African Basketball Championship

Tournament details
- Host country: Senegal
- City: Dakar
- Dates: 15–22 August 1999
- Teams: 7 (from 1 confederation)
- Venue: 1 (in 1 host city)

Final positions
- Champions: Angola (1st title)

Tournament statistics
- MVP: (Angola) Teresa Gonçalves

Official website
- 1999 FIBA Africa Under-18 Championship for Women

The 1998 FIBA Africa Under-18 Championship for Women was the 5th FIBA Africa Under-18 Championship for Women, played under the rules of FIBA, the world governing body for basketball, and the FIBA Africa thereof. The tournament was hosted by Senegal from August 15 to 22, 1999.

Angola ended the double round-robin tournament with a 6–0 unbeaten record to win their first title.

== Participating teams ==
Angola
Egypt
Mali
Senegal

== Schedule ==
| P | Team | M | W | L | PF | PA | Diff | Pts. |
|---|---|---|---|---|---|---|---|---|
| 1 | Angola | 6 | 6 | 0 | 281 | 232 | +49 | 12 |
| 2 | Senegal | 6 | 4 | 2 | 293 | 212 | +27 | 11 |
| 3 | Egypt | 6 | 1 | 5 | 253 | 319 | -66 | 10 |
| 4 | Mali | 6 | 1 | 5 | 149 | 213 | -64 | 9 |

August 16

Boxscore

| Angola | 38–36 | Senegal |
Scoring by half: 22-17, 16-19

Dakar

August 16

| Mali | 0–20 | Egypt |

Dakar

August 15

Boxscore

| Senegal | 94–51 | Egypt |
Scoring by half: 42-26, 52-25

Dakar

August 18

| Mali | 0–20 | Angola |

Dakar

August 17

Boxscore

| Egypt | 57–75 | Angola |
Scoring by half: 26-42, 31-33

Dakar

August 17

Boxscore

| Senegal | 46–44 | Mali |
Scoring by half: 24-23, 22-21

Dakar

August 19

Boxscore

| Senegal | 43–45 | Angola |
Scoring by half: 24-19, 19-26

Dakar

August 21

Boxscore

| Egypt | 49–51 | Mali |
Scoring by half: 26-11, 23-40

Dakar

August 20

Boxscore

| Egypt | 34–54 | Senegal |
Scoring by half: 22-24, 12-30

Dakar

August 20

Boxscore

| Angola | 58–54 | Mali |
Scoring by half: 22-26, 36-28

Dakar

August 22

Boxscore

| Angola | 45–42 | Egypt |
Scoring by half: 24-24, 21-18

Dakar

August

| Mali | 0–20 | Senegal |

Dakar

== Final standings ==
| Rank | Team | Record |
|---|---|---|
| Gold medal | Angola | 6–0 |
| Silver medal | Senegal | 4–2 |
| Bronze medal | Egypt | 1–5 |
| 4 | Mali | 1–5 |

== Awards ==
1998 FIBA Africa Under-18 Championship for Women winner

Angola
First title

Most Valuable Player
(Angola) Teresa Gonçalves

== See also ==
- 2000 FIBA Africa Championship for Women
