= Moroccan Royal Basketball Federation =

Moroccan Royal Basketball Federation Fédération Royale Marocaine de basketball (FRMBB)
- Sport: Basketball
- Founded: 1956
- CEO: Aourach Mostafa
- No. of teams: 164 clubs
- Country: Morocco
- Continent: Africa
- Website: Site web officiel de la FRMBB

The Moroccan Royal Basketball Federation (Arabic: الجامعة الملكية المغربية لكرة السلة; Standard Moroccan Tamazight: ⵜⴰⵙⴷⴰⵡⵉⵜ ⵜⴰⴳⵍⴷⴰⵏⵜ ⵜⴰⵎⵖⵔⴰⴱⵉⵜ ⵏ ⵜⵡⵊⵊⴰ ⵏ ⵜⵙⴽⵏⵉⵜ) (FRMBB) is the governing body of basketball in Morocco. that was Formed in 1956, based in the capital city Rabat. The FRMBB is a full member of the International Basketball Federation (FIBA) and also it is one of the FIBA Africa member. The current president of the federation is Aourach Mostafa.

== History ==
On 21 April 2025, the federation has temporarily suspended all national basketball league competitions, across all divisions, effective immediately due to financial crisis.

== Current Governors Bureau ==
Role	Member
President	Aourach Mostafa
vice-president	Tamditi Abdelhak
vice-president	El Medrej Neigra
General secretary	Baddi Brahim
General secretary Assistant	Tounsi Mohammed
General treasurer	Jaraf Ahmed
General treasurer Assistant	Abdouh Kamal
Adviser	Labib Lamyae
Adviser	Aziz Daif
Adviser	El Yamani Said
Adviser	Chemlal Hassan
Adviser	Beloubad Noureddine
Adviser	Jdaini Mostafa
Adviser	Lamdaouar Mohamed Oussama
Adviser	Froud Sellam

== Presidents ==
- Mohamed Smirès
- Mohamed Alami
- Hamid Skalli
- Thami Bennis
- Mohammed Ibrahimi
- Hammouda Yousri
- Noureddine Benabdenbi
- khalid tajeddine
- Khalid Taje-eddine

== See also ==
- Morocco national basketball team
- Morocco women's national basketball team
- Morocco national under-19 basketball team
- Morocco national under-17 basketball team
- Morocco women's national under-19 basketball team
- Morocco women's national under-17 basketball team
- Morocco national 3x3 team
- Morocco women's national 3x3 team
- Morocco Division I Basketball League
- Morocco Basketball Cup
