= Niger women's national basketball team =

Team representing Niger

Niger
- FIBA ranking: NR (9 February 2025)
- Joined FIBA: 1963
- FIBA zone: FIBA Africa
- National federation: Fédération Nigérienne de Basket-Ball

AfroBasket
- Appearances: 2
light	dark

The Niger women's national basketball team represents Niger in international competitions. It is administered by the Fédération Nigérienne de Basket-Ball.

== AfroBasket record ==
- 2000 – 10th place
- 2005 – 8th place
