= Mariame Kolga =

Ivorian basketball player

Personal information
- Born: May 31, 1983 (age 43) Treichville, Ivory Coast
- Listed height: 1.68 m (5 ft 6 in)
- Position: Point guard / shooting guard

Career history
- 2007–2012: CS d'Abidjan

Mariame Kolga (born May 31, 1983) is an Ivorian female professional basketball player. She was named to the 2007 national team.
