= Nguveren Iyorhe =

Nigerian basketball player

Nguveren Iyorhe (born 9 June 1981) is a Nigerian basketball player who competed in the 2004 Summer Olympics.
