= Tatianne Cabral =

Cape Verdean basketball player

Personal information
- Born: January 9, 1979 (age 47) Guinea-Bissau

Tatianne Ingrid Pires Cabral (born January 9, 1979) is a former Cape Verdean female basketball player.
