= Kadiatou Touré =

Malian basketball player (born 1983)

Kadiatou Touré (born January 18, 1983) is a Malian women's basketball player. Toure competed for Mali at the 2008 Summer Olympics, where she scored 17 points in 5 games. She was born in Markala, Ségou Region on the Niger River.
