= Awa Guèye =

Senegalese basketball player

Personal information
- Born: 31 August 1978 (age 48) Dakar, Senegal

Awa Guèye (born 31 August 1978 in Dakar) is a Senegalese former basketball player for the Senegal women's national basketball team who competed in the 2000 Summer Olympics. She also competed with Senegal at the 2006 and 2010 FIBA World Championships for Women as well as at the 2008 World Qualifying Tournament for the Summer Olympics.
