= Ndialou Paye =

Senegalese basketball player

Ndialou Paye (born 29 January 1974 in Dakar) is a Senegalese former basketball player who competed in the 2000 Summer Olympics.
