= Adeola Olanrewaju =

Nigerian basketball player

- Born: 12 January 1982 (age 44); Lagos State, Nigeria
- Occupation: Basketball Player
- Height: 192 cm (6 ft 4 in)

Adeola Olanrewaju (born 12 January 1982) is a Nigerian basketball player.

== Early life ==
Adeola Olanrewaju was born on 12 January 1982 in Lagos State, Nigeria.

== Education ==
She attended Bishop Loughlin High school and Xavier college where she graduated in the year 2005 after which she started her career.

== Career ==
She played in Nigeria women's national basketball team known as D'Tigeress as Number 14 in the year 2006 where she competed in the FIBA world championships, and in 2009 she tried to qualify for the world championships. Her position is Center. She joined the Ceyphan team (Turkey) in the year 2010 and her agency is SIG.
