= Mariame Sylla =

Ivorian basketball player

Personal information
- Born: March 20, 1986 (age 40)

Career history
- 2007: Abidjan Basket Club

Mariame Sylla (born March 20, 1986) is an Ivorian female professional basketball player.
