= Rosângela Lagos =

Cape Verdean basketball player (born 1980)

Personal information
- Born: May 9, 1980 (age 46) Praia, Cape Verde

Rosângela Teress Semedo Lagos (born May 9, 1980) is a Cape Verdean female basketball player.
