= Mariame Gbané =

Ivorian basketball player

Personal information
- Born: April 16, 1982 (age 44)

Career history
- ?: Abidjan Basket Club

Mariame Gbané (born April 16, 1982) is an Ivorian female professional basketball player. She was a member of the 2007 Ivory Coast national basketball team.
