= Mfon Udoka =

Nigerian-American basketball player and coach (born 1976)

Personal information
- Born: June 16, 1976 (age 50) Portland, Oregon, U.S.
- Listed height: 6 ft 0 in (1.83 m)
- Listed weight: 187 lb (85 kg)

Career information
- High school: Benson (Portland, Oregon)
- College: DePaul (1994–1998)
- WNBA draft: 1998: undrafted
- Position: Forward

Career history
- 1998: Detroit Shock
- 2003: Houston Comets
- 2004: Los Angeles Sparks

Career highlights
- First-team All-CUSA (1997, 1998)
- Stats at Basketball Reference

Mfon Sunday Udoka (born June 16, 1976) is a Nigerian-American former professional basketball player who is an assistant coach for the Nigeria women's national basketball team, the D'Tigress. Born in Portland, Oregon, Udoka graduated from Benson Polytechnic High School (1994) in Portland before attending DePaul University in Chicago, Illinois from 1994 to 1998. She is the older sister of coach and former NBA player Ime Udoka.

== 1998-2003 ==
After leaving DePaul in 1998, Udoka signed with the Detroit Shock of the WNBA. With Detroit, she appeared in three games. Udoka left the U.S. following the 1998 season, moving to Portugal for the 1998–99 season. She returned to school to complete her degree in Communications in 2000, and also rehabilitated her ACL injury she suffered in the summer of 1999. In 2001, she slowly resumed her basketball career with the Birmingham Power of the National Women's Basketball League. Following the end of the 2001 NWBL season, Udoka again left the U.S., moving to Israel, where she played briefly with Electra Ramat HaSharon before moving to compete with Harbin in China for the 2002 season. For the 2003 season, Udoka went back to Harbin before playing with the Chicago Blaze, again of the NWBL. In 2003, she was invited to the Houston Comets training camp and made the roster as a free agent.

== 2003-2004 ==
Taking several years away from the WNBA, Udoka returned in 2003 with the Houston Comets. With the Comets, she played in 25 games and started 3 of them, averaging 3.2 points per game in 10 minutes. Udoka signed with the Los Angeles Sparks for the short remainder of the 2004 WNBA season, after competing for Nigeria in the Athens Olympics, but played in only 3 games.

== 2004-2007 ==
After leaving Los Angeles, Udoka moved to Spain (2004), then the Athens Summer Olympics and Russia (2005). She played in Mersin, Turkey for the second half of the 2006 season and spent a short time with Tarbes Gespe Bigorre of France's Ligue Féminine de Basketball in 2007.

== International competitions ==
Udoka led the Nigeria women's national basketball team to the 2004 Summer Olympics. At the Olympics, she was second in the tournament in scoring and rebounding but Nigeria finished 11th out of 12 teams. They became the first African team to ever win a game at the Olympics. Udoka also led Nigeria at the 2006 FIBA World Championship for Women, where Nigeria finished in last (16th) place.

== Coaching ==
In May 2011, Udoka was named as the new Assistant Coach for the Nigeria women's national basketball team D'Tigress as they prepare for the African Nations Cup in Mali and the All Africa Games.

Udoka began her college coaching career for the 2024–25 season as the women's basketball head coach at Beacon College in Leesburg, Florida.

== Career playing statistics ==
Legend
GP	Games played	GS	Games started	MPG	Minutes per game	RPG	Rebounds per game
APG	Assists per game	SPG	Steals per game	BPG	Blocks per game	PPG	Points per game
TO	Turnovers per game	FG%	Field-goal percentage	3P%	3-point field-goal percentage	FT%	Free-throw percentage
**Bold**	Career best	°	League leader

=== WNBA ===
==== Regular season ====
Year	Team	GP	GS	MPG	FG%	3P%	FT%	RPG	APG	SPG	BPG	TO	PPG
1998	Detroit	3	0	8.3	.167	–	.500	1.0	.0	.0	.0	**.3**	1.3
2003	Houston	**25**	**3**	**10.0**	**.500**	.000	**.696**	**2.0**	**.2**	**.2**	**.1**	.8	**3.2**
2004	Los Angeles	3	0	6.3	.000	–	.250	1.0	.0	.0	.0	**.3**	.3
Career	3 years, 3 teams	31	3	9.5	.458	.000	.613	1.8	.1	.1	.1	.7	2.7

==== Playoffs ====
Year	Team	GP	GS	MPG	FG%	3P%	FT%	RPG	APG	SPG	BPG	TO	PPG
2003	Houston	1	0	6.0	–	–	.500	1.0	.0	.0	.0	2.0	1.0

== Head coaching record ==
Season	Team	Overall	Conference	Standing	Postseason
2024–25	Beacon College	5–6	USCAA Division I (New South Athletic Conference)	1st	NSAC Champions
2025–26	Beacon College	3–11	USCAA Division I (New South Athletic Conference)	3rd	
Total	2 Seasons	8–17 (.320)			
