= Aisha Mohammed (basketball) =

Nigerian basketball player

No. 9 – Bursas BSB
- Position: Forward
- League: TKBL

Personal information
- Born: 21 October 1985 (age 41) Lagos, Nigeria
- Listed height: 1.93 m (6 ft 4 in)
- Listed weight: 80 kg (176 lb)

Career information
- College: Virginia (2009)
- WNBA draft: 2009: undrafted
Medals
Women's basketball
Representing Nigeria
African Games (All-Africa Games)
| Gold medal – first place | 2003 Abuja | Team |
| Bronze medal – third place | 2011 Maputo | Team |
AfroBasket
| Gold medal – first place | 2003 Mozambique |
| Gold medal – first place | 2005 Nigeria |
| Gold medal – first place | 2017 Mali |
| Gold medal – first place | 2019 Senegal |

Aisha Mohammed (born 21 October 1985) is a Nigerian basketball player for Bursas BSB and the Nigerian national team.

== Early life and education ==
Aisha was born in Ikeja, Lagos cantonment, to a northern father. Her mother was from Edo state. She grew up in the military barracks. She left with her family at eight years when her father was transferred to Keffi. They moved again to Birnin Kebbi and then to Port Harcourt. Her dad was an Imam. Aisha stands tall at 193 cm (6 ft 4 in)

== Career ==
Aisha is a member of the 'Elephant Girls' Basketball Team. The team won over the FAP side 69–66 in the semi-finals which earned them a place at the Maxaquene Stadium. She scored 23 points and got the seven rebounds that enabled the 'Elephant Girls' to win the game.

Aisha played at the FIBA Women's World Cup in Brasil 2006 and Spain 2019; she helped them qualify to the Quarter-Finals. That was the first time an African side qualified to the quarter-final FIBA Women's World Cup in history. Aisha helped the Nigeria women's national basketball team to the 2004 Summer Olympics. At the Olympics Athen 2004, she was the third-best scorer and rebounder in the team with double double; however, Nigeria finished 11th out of 12 teams. They became the first African team ever to win a game at the Olympics. And also she Participated in Tokyo 2020 Olympics in July 2021. Aisha played at the First Bank side. In 2019 after the FIBA Women’s Afrobasket, Aisha announced that she would not play at the biennial championship again. She stopped playing basketball after the 2020 Tokyo Olympics as she said she needed to raise a family where her children will take over with playing basketball.

== Achievements ==
- FIBA Women's AfroBasket 2017
- four titles winner with the African Champions: 2003, 2005, 2017 and 2019
- D’Tigress captain
