= Mobolaji Akiode =

Basketball player

Mobolaji Iyabode Akiode
Personal information
- Born: May 12, 1982 (age 44) New Jersey, U.S.

Career information
- High school: Columbia High School (Maplewood, New Jersey)
- College: Fordham University (1999–2004)

Career highlights
- Fordham University Basketball Hall of Fame (2014)

Mobolaji Iyabode Akiode (born May 12, 1982) is an American-born former Nigerian women's basketball player.

== Early life ==
Born in New Jersey, her family relocated to Nigeria shortly thereafter. Akiode moved back to the United States when she was nine and was raised in Maplewood, New Jersey. She was bullied for her height, but excelled academically and athletically and led Columbia High School to the 1998 state championship before graduating in 1999. Akiode earned a scholarship to play college basketball at Fordham University. At Fordham, Akiode won all-conference honors in her senior year and was the eighth Fordham player to record 1,000 points and 500 rebounds in her career. She also earned a tryout with the WNBA's Detroit Shock following her collegiate career.

== Education ==
Akiode studied Accounting at Gabelli School of business, Fordham University, she graduated in 2004. She obtained her Masters of Business Administration from the New York University Stern School of Business in 2014.

== College career ==
Akiode earned a scholarship to play college basketball at Fordham University. At Fordham, Akiode won all-conference honors in her senior year and was the eighth Fordham player to record 1,000 points and 500 rebounds in her career. She also earned a tryout with the WNBA's Detroit Shock following her collegiate career. She was inducted into the Fordhams University basketball Hall of fame in 2014.

=== Fordham statistics ===
Legend
GP	Games played	GS	Games started	MPG	Minutes per game
FG%	Field goal percentage	3P%	3-point field goal percentage	FT%	Free throw percentage
RPG	Rebounds per game	APG	Assists per game	SPG	Steals per game
BPG	Blocks per game	PPG	Points per game	**Bold**	Career high

Year	Team	GP	Points	FG%	3P%	FT%	RPG	APG	SPG	BPG	PPG
1999-00	Forham	27	162	42.5%	0.0%	60.3%	5.0	0.8	1.0	**0.8**	6.0
2000-01	Forham	26	233	**45.5%**	0.0%	72.4%	**5.5**	1.1	0.8	0.6	9.0
2001-02	Forham	29	277	39.0%	**32.4%**	71.6%	4.0	1.2	1.3	0.3	9.6
2002-03	Forham	**30**	**495**	40.1%	30.6%	**77.0%**	5.4	**1.9**	**1.4**	0.5	**16.5**
Career		112	1167	41.1%	30.4%	71.9%	4.9	1.3	1.2	0.5	10.4

== International career ==
Akiode was member of the Nigeria women's national basketball team at the 2004 Summer Olympics and 2006 Commonwealth Games. She graduated from Fordham with a degree in accounting. After graduation, she landed a job to work for ESPN. She moved back to Nigeria in 2010 to start a basketball camp. In 2014, she was named one of ESPNW's Impact 25.

=== Basketball camp ===
Akiode organizes an annual basketball camp called the Hope for Girls basketball camp which seeks to develop and mentor girls in the knowledge of basketball. She has created opportunities for women to play basketball and study outside of Nigeria.
