= FIBA Women's AfroBasket Most Valuable Player =

The AfroBasket Women Most Valuable Player Award is a FIBA award given every two years, to the Most Outstanding player throughout the tournament.

== Winners ==
| | Denotes player whose team won that years tournament |
| | Denotes player inducted into the FIBA Hall of Fame |
| | Denotes player who is still active |
| Player (X) | Denotes the number of times the player had been named MVP at that time |
| Team (X) | Denotes the number of times a player from this team had won at that time |

| Year | Player | Position | Team | Ref. |
|---|---|---|---|---|
| 1966 | Ndeye Salla Kane | – | Senegal | |
| 1974 | Rokhaya Pouye | – | Senegal | |
| 1977 | Kankou Koulibaly | – | Senegal | |
| 1981 | Fatou Kiné N'Diaye | Forward | Senegal | |
| 1983 | Longanza Kamimbaya | – | Zaire | |
| 1984 | Aminata Diagne | – | Senegal | |
| 1986 | Kasala Kamanga | Guard | Zaire | |
| 1990 | Anne Marie Dioh | Forward | Senegal | |
| 1993 | Mame Maty Mbengue | Center | Senegal | |
| 1994 | Mwadi Mabika | Guard | Zaire | |
| 1997 | Mame Maty Mbengue (2) | Center | Senegal | |
| 2000 | Mame Maty Mbengue (3) | Center | Senegal | |
| 2003 | Deolinda Ngulela | Guard | Mozambique | |
| 2005 | Mfon Udoka | Forward | Nigeria | |
| 2007 | Hamchétou Maïga | Forward | Mali | |
| 2009 | Aya Traoré | Forward | Senegal | |
| 2011 | Nacissela Maurício | Forward | Angola | |
| 2013 | Nacissela Maurício (2) | Forward | Angola | |
| 2015 | Aya Traoré (2) | Forward | Senegal | |
| 2017 | Astou Traoré | Forward | Senegal | |
| 2019 | Ezinne Kalu | Guard | Nigeria | |
| 2021 | Adaora Elonu | Forward | Nigeria | |
| 2023 | Amy Okonkwo | Forward | Nigeria | |
| 2025 | Amy Okonkwo | Forward | Nigeria | |

== See also ==
- FIBA AfroBasket Women All-Tournament Team
- FIBA Women's Basketball World Cup Most Valuable Player
- FIBA Women's Basketball World Cup All-Tournament Team
- FIBA Awards
