= Basketball at the 2004 Summer Olympics – Women's qualification =

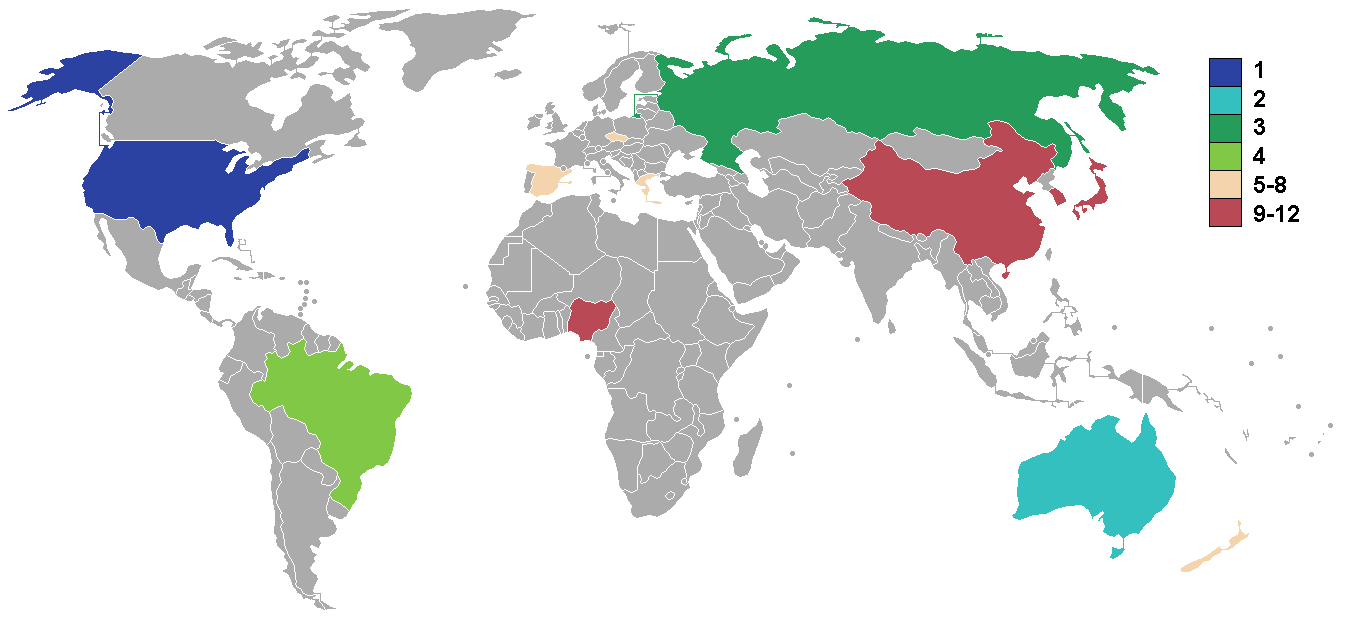
2004 women's teams.

The women's qualification for the 2004 Olympic women's basketball tournament occurred from 2002–2003; all five FIBA (International Basketball Federation) zones sent in teams.

The first qualifying tournament was the 2002 FIBA World Championship for Women in which the champion was guaranteed a place in the Olympics. Throughout the next two years, several regional tournaments served as qualification for the zonal tournaments, which doubles as intercontinental championships, to determine which teams were to participate in the 2004 Athens Summer Olympics.

== Qualification ==
A total of 12 teams took part in the Olympics, with each NOC sending in one team.

The host nation (Greece) qualified automatically as hosts.

United States qualified automatically by winning at the 2002 FIBA World Championship for Women.

The other 10 teams were determined by five zonal tournaments (doubling as continental championships), held in 2003. Each zone was allocated with the following qualifying berths:

- FIBA Africa: 1 team (Champion)
- FIBA Americas: 1 teams (Champion)
- FIBA Asia: 3 teams (Champion, runner-up and third place)
- FIBA Europe: 3 teams (Champion, runner-up and third place)
- FIBA Oceania: 2 teams (Champion and runner-up)

== Summary ==
Qualified for the Olympics outright
Qualified automatically

These are the final standings of the different Olympic qualifying tournaments. The venues are as follows:

- 2002 FIBA World Championship for Women: Nanjing (China)
- FIBA Africa Championship 2003: Maputo (Mozambique)
- FIBA Americas Championship for Women 2003: Culiacan (Mexico)
- FIBA Asia Championship for Women 2003: Sendai (Japan)
- EuroBasket Women 2003: Patras (Greece)
- FIBA Oceania Championship 2003: Launceston, Davenport (Australia)

Rank	World	Africa	Americas	Asia	Europe	Oceania
1st	United States	Nigeria	Brazil	China	Russia	Australia
2nd	Russia	Mozambique	Cuba	Japan	Czech Republic	New Zealand
3rd	Australia	Senegal	Canada	South Korea	Spain	
4th	South Korea	Angola	Mexico	Chinese Taipei	Poland	
5th	Spain	Mali	Argentina	Thailand	France	
6th	China	Tunisia	Chile	Malaysia	Belgium	
7th	Brazil	DR Congo	Dominican Republic	India	Slovakia	
8th	France	Cambodia		Philippines	Serbia and Montenegro	
9th	Cuba	South Africa		Hong Kong	Greece	
10th	Argentina	Algeria			Hungary	
11th	Lithuania				Ukraine	
12th	Yugoslavia				Israel	
13th	Japan					
14th	Chinese Taipei					
15th	Senegal					
16th	Tunisia					
