= Angola women's national basketball team =

Angola
- FIBA ranking: 46 ▼4 (9 February 2025)
- Joined FIBA: 1979
- FIBA zone: FIBA Africa
- National federation: Federação Angolana de Basquetebol
- Coach: Paulo Macedo

Olympic Games
- Appearances: 1

World Cup
- Appearances: 1

AfroBasket
- Appearances: 21
- Medals: (2011, 2013) (1981, 1986, 1994, 2007, 2009)
Home	Away

Angola women's national basketball team is the basketball team which represents Angolan women internationally. In 2011 FIBA Africa Championship for Women They won their first Continental African title and they qualified for the first time to 2012 Summer Olympics. They have made their only appearance so far in the FIBA Women's Basketball World Cup in 2014, where they finished last among 16 teams.

== History ==
=== FIBA Africa Championship for Women 2007 ===
The squad traveled to Senegal for the FIBA Africa Championship for Women 2007 in September 2007. It went 4–1 in the first round of the competition, losing only to the Democratic Republic of the Congo once they had clinched advancement to the next round. In the round of single elimination, Angola beat Côte d'Ivoire 44–42, before losing to eventual champion Mali by 9. In the third place game, Angola beat Mozambique by 15 to clinch a spot in the qualifying tournament for the 2008 Summer Olympics.

=== FIBA Africa Championship for Women 2011 ===
Angola won its first African title at the 2011 FIBA Africa Championship for Women in Bamako, Mali. It finished with a 7–1 record with Small forward Nacissela Maurício being named the tournament's MVP. Moreover, Power forward Sónia Guadalupe was named to the All-Tournament team. With this win, Angola secured a spot at the 2012 Summer Olympics.

== Results ==
=== Olympic Games ===
Year	Reached	Position	GP	W	L	GS	GA	GD
(United Kingdom) London 2012	Group stage	12th	5	0	5	243	395	−152
Total	1/1	0 titles	5	0	5	243	395	−152

=== World Cup ===
Year	Reached	Position	GP	W	L	GS	GA	GD
(Turkey) Istanbul/Ankara 2014	Group stage	16th	3	0	3	125	286	−161
Total	1/1	0 titles	3	0	3	125	186	−161

=== African Games ===
Year	Reached	Position	GP	W	L	GS	GA	GD
(Kenya) Nairobi 1987	Final	2nd	5	2	3	243	278	−35
(Egypt) Cairo 1991	Did not participate							
(Zimbabwe) Harare 1995	Qualifiers	–	1	0	1	45	46	−1
(South Africa) Jo'burg 1999
(Nigeria) Abuja 2003	round robin	4th	5	3	2	323	312	+11
(Algeria) Algiers 2007	Semi-finals	3rd	7	5	2	384	362	+22
(Mozambique) Maputo 2011	Final	2nd	8	7	1	494	347	+147
(Republic of the Congo) Brazzaville 2015	Semi-finals	3rd	7	5	2	392	361	+31
Total	5/8	0 titles	27	20	7	1,836	1,660	+176

=== AfroBasket ===
Year	Reached	Position	GP	W	L	GS	GA	GD
(Senegal) Dakar 1981	Semi-finals	3rd	5	3	2	366	325	+41
(Angola) Luanda 1983	Quarter-finals	6th	5	1	4	277	350	−73
(Senegal) Dakar 1984	Quarter-finals	7th	4	1	3	255	255	0
(Mozambique) Maputo 1986	Semi-finals	3rd	4	2	2	307	246	+61
(Tunisia) Tunis 1990	Quarter-finals	5th	4	2	2	268	233	+35
(Senegal) Dakar 1993	Quarter-finals	6th	5	2	3	321	312	+9
(South Africa) Jo'burg 1994	Semi-finals	3rd	5	3	2	310	236	+74
(Kenya) Nairobi 1997	Quarter-finals	5th	5	3	2	316	252	+64
(Tunisia) Tunis 2000	Quarter-finals	5th	5	3	2	438	293	+145
(Mozambique) Maputo 2003	Semi-finals	4th	6	4	2	387	320	+67
(Nigeria) Abuja 2005	Quarter-finals	6th	5	2	3	295	222	+73
(Senegal) Dakar 2007	Semi-finals	3rd	8	6	2	463	396	+67
(Madagascar) Antananarivo 2009	Semi-finals	3rd	8	6	2	508	436	+72
(Mali) Bamako 2011	Final	1st	8	7	1	495	432	+63
(Mozambique) Maputo 2013	Final	1st	8	8	0	490	399	+91
(Cameroon) Yaoundé 2015	Semi-finals	4th	8	5	3	485	415	+70
(Mali) Bamako 2017	Quarter-finals	6th	8	6	2	543	466	+77
(Senegal) Dakar 2019	Quarter-finals	5th	6	4	2	286	239	+47
(Cameroon) Yaoundé 2021	Quarter-finals	8th	6	2	4	403	429	−26
(Rwanda) Kigali 2023	Qualification to quarterfinals	9th	3	0	3	212	211	−25
(Ivory Coast) Abidjan 2025	Qualification to quarterfinals	10th	3	0	3	192	237	−45
Total	21/28	2 titles	119	70	49	7617	6704	+887

== Angola all-time record against all nations ==
Against	Pld	Wn	Lst	GF	GA	GD	Details
Algeria	5	5	0	356	237	+119	Extended content 71–53 2015 AB PR (26 Sep 2015) Yaoundé 61–51 2015 AG PR (9 Sep 2015) Brazzaville 85–39 2011 AG QF (10 Sep 2011) Maputo 53–42 2007 AG PR (17 Jul 2007) Algiers 86–52 1981 AB PR (5 Sep 1981) Dakar
Botswana	1	1	0	116	35	+81	Extended content 116–35 2003 AG QL (3 May 2003) Maputo
Cameroon	10	9	1	705	519	+186	Extended content 66–54 2017 AB 5–8 (26 Aug 2017) Bamako 78–56 2017 AB PR (18 Aug 2017) Bamako 58–51 2015 AG QF (15 Sep 2015) Brazzaville 48–44 2013 AB PR (24 Sep 2013) Maputo 66–45 2011 AB PR (26 Sep 2011) Bamako 69–41 2011 AG PR (6 Sep 2011) Maputo 63–38 2007 AB PR (24 Sep 2007) Thiès 77–44 2003 AB PR (23 Dec 2003) Maputo 112–68 1986 AB R2 (20 Dec 1986) Maputo 68–78 1983 AB R5 (8 Apr 1983) Luanda
Cape Verde	2	2	0	142	92	+50	Extended content 76–51 2013 AB PR (21 Sep 2013) Maputo 66–41 2007 AB PR (23 Sep 2007) Thiès
Central African Republic	1	1	0	96	58	+38	Extended content 96–58 2017 AB PR (23 Aug 2017) Bamako
China	2	0	2	91	141	−50	Extended content 39–65 2014 WC PR (28 Sep 2014) Istanbul 52–76 2012 OL PR (1 Aug 2012) London
Congo	1	1	0	101	63	+38	Extended content 101–63 1993 AB PR (19 Dec 1993) Dakar
Croatia	1	0	1	56	75	−19	Extended content 56–75 2012 OL PR (3 Aug 2012) London
Czech Republic	1	0	1	47	82	−35	Extended content 47–82 2012 OL PR (5 Aug 2012) London
DR Congo	14	0	14	831	1.070	−239	Extended content 42–52 2007 AB PR (26 Sep 2007) Thiès 58–74 2007 AG PR (12 Jul 2007) Algiers 52–53 2005 AB PR (24 Dec 2005) Abuja 63–74 2003 AG R3 (7 Oct 2003) Abuja 85–86 2000 AB PR (10 Nov 2000) Tunis 56–69 1997 AB PR (12 Dec 1997) Nairobi 46–60 1994 AB PR (13 Dec 1994) Johannesburg 51–71 1993 AB PR (18 Dec 1993) Dakar 49–64 1990 AB PR (20 Mar 1990) Tunis 45–88 1987 AG F (12 Aug 1987) Nairobi 64–72 1987 AG PR (4 Aug 1987) Nairobi 68–76 1986 AB R1 (18 Dec 1986) Maputo 33–92 1984 AB PR (26 Dec 1984) Dakar 57–71 1983 AB R4 (7 Apr 1983) Luanda 62–68 1981 AB PR (8 Sep 1981) Dakar
Egypt	4	4	0	289	214	+75	Extended content 53–52 2015 AB PR (28 Sep 2015) Yaoundé 84–49 2013 AB QF (27 Sep 2013) Maputo 80–72 2000 AB PR (7 Nov 2000) Tunis 72–41 1990 AB PR (18 Mar 1990) Tunis
Gabon	3	3	0	227	132	+95	Extended content 104–49 2015 AB QF (1 Oct 2015) Yaoundé 60–47 2015 AG PR (10 Sep 2015) Brazzaville 63–36 2005 AB PR (26 Dec 2005) Abuja
Guinea	3	3	0	268	140	+128	Extended content 89–47 2015 AB PR (29 Sep 2015) Yaoundé 63–49 2011 AB PR (28 Sep 2011) Bamako 116–44 1984 AB 7P (29 Dec 1984) Dakar
Ivory Coast	13	10	3	821	686	+135	Extended content 56–61 2017 AB 5P (27 Aug 2017) Bamako 70–62 2017 AB PR (22 Aug 2017) Bamako 49–48 2015 AG PR (11 Sep 2015) Brazzaville 72–51 2011 AB QF (30 Sep 2011) Bamako 59–34 2011 AG PR (7 Sep 2011) Maputo 76–57 2009 AB 3P (18 Oct 2009) Antananarivo 65–55 2009 AB PR (11 Oct 2009) Antananarivo 44–42 2007 AB QF (28 Sep 2007) Dakar 51–39 2007 AG PR (13 Jul 2007) Algiers 75–49 2003 AG R5 (10 Oct 2003) Abuja 56–67 1993 AB 5P (28 Dec 1993) Dakar 93–62 1990 AB 5P (23 Mar 1990) Tunis 55–59 1983 AB R3 (6 Apr 1983) Luanda
Kenya	5	4	1	331	272	+59	Extended content 45–39 2013 AB PR (23 Sep 2013) Maputo 62–44 2007 AB PR (21 Sep 2007) Thiès 74–72 2003 AG R4 (9 Oct 2003) Abuja 70–71 1987 AG PR (4 Aug 1987) Nairobi 80–46 1986 AB R4 (23 Dec 1986) Maputo
Mali	11	7	4	672	655	+17	Extended content 68–59 2017 AB PR (19 Aug 2017) Bamako 67–66 2013 AB PR (25 Sep 2013) Maputo 56–51 2011 AB SF (1 Oct 2011) Bamako 45–38 2011 AG PR (4 Sep 2011) Maputo 70–60 2009 AB SF (17 Oct 2009) Bamako 51–63 2009 AB PR (13 Oct 2009) Antananarivo 60–69 2007 AB SF (29 Sep 2007) Dakar 50–55 2005 AB 5P (28 Dec 2005) Abuja 65–57 1997 AB 5P (19 Dec 1997) Nairobi 57–66 1984 AB PR (23 Dec 1984) Dakar 83–71 1981 AB 3P (11 Sep 1981) Dakar
Mozambique	17	12	5	983	886	+97	Extended content 47–61 2017 AB QF (25 Aug 2017) Bamako 64–61 2013 AB F (29 Sep 2013) Maputo 68–36 2009 AB QF (16 Oct 2009) Antananarivo 73–58 2007 AB 3P (30 Sep 2007) Dakar 53–43 2007 AG 3P (21 Jul 2007) Algiers 48–46 2007 AG PR (14 Jul 2007) Algiers 51–52 2005 AB PR (22 Dec 2005) Abuja 73–66 2003 AB PR (20 Dec 2003) Maputo 61–60 2003 AG QL (2 May 2003) Maputo 68–62 2000 AB 5P (12 Nov 2000) Tunis 45–46 1995 AG QL (25 Mar 1995) Maputo 53–29 1994 AB 3P (17 Dec 1994) Johannesburg 60–54 1993 AB PR (22 Dec 1993) Dakar 64–47 1987 AG SF (8 Aug 1987) Nairobi 47–56 1986 AB R3 (22 Dec 1986) Maputo 49–53 1984 AB PR (24 Dec 1984) Dakar 59–56 1983 AB R2 (4 Apr 1983) Luanda
Niger	2	2	0	233	46	+187	Extended content 79–26 2005 AB PR (25 Dec 2005) Abuja 154–20 2000 AB PR (9 Nov 2000) Tunis
Nigeria	12	8	4	678	624	+54	Extended content 55–65 2015 AB 3P (3 Oct 2015) Yaoundé 57–51 2015 AB PR (25 Sep 2015) Yaoundé 59–61 2015 AG SF (17 Sep 2015) Brazzaville 60–46 2013 AB PR (20 Sep 2013) Maputo 67–60 2011 AB PR (27 Sep 2011) Bamako 70–55 2011 AG SF (11 Sep 2011) Maputo 60–45 2009 AB PR (14 Oct 2009) Antananarivo 53–42 2007 AB PR (22 Sep 2007) Thiès 61–64 2003 AB SF (26 Dec 2003) Maputo 59–55 2003 AG R2 (6 Oct 2003) Abuja 77–80 1997 AB PR (15 Dec 1997) Nairobi 00–00 1987 AG PR (6 Aug 1987) Nairobi
Rwanda	3	3	0	186	135	+51	Extended content 67–59 2011 AB PR (25 Sep 2011) Bamako 53–22 2011 AG PR (5 Sep 2011) Maputo 66–54 2009 AB PR (9 Oct 2009) Antananarivo
Senegal	16	6	10	824	959	−135	Extended content 54–56 2015 AB SF (2 Oct 2015) Yaoundé 50–46 2015 AB PR (24 Sep 2015) Yaoundé 53–42 2015 AG 3P (18 Sep 2015) Brazzaville 52–63 2015 AG PR (13 Sep 2015) Brazzaville 46–43 2013 AB SF (28 Sep 2013) Maputo 62–54 2011 AB F (2 Oct 2011) Bamako 63–42 2011 AB PR (24 Sep 2011) Bamako 57–64 2011 AG F (12 Sep 2011) Maputo 56–52 2011 AG PR (2 Sep 2011) Maputo 49–71 2007 AG SF (20 Jul 2007) Algiers 47–61 2003 AB 3P (28 Dec 2003) Maputo 52–62 2003 AG R1 (5 Oct 2003) Abuja 52–63 1994 AB SF (15 Dec 1994) Johannesburg 54–66 1990 AB PR (21 Mar 1990) Tunis 38–86 1983 AB R1 (3 Apr 1983) Luanda 39–88 1981 AB SF (10 Sep 1981) Dakar
Serbia	1	0	1	42	102	−60	Extended content 42–102 2014 WC PR (27 Sep 2014) Istanbul
South Africa	4	3	1	264	166	+98	Extended content 73–31 2003 AB PR (22 Dec 2003) Maputo 60–31 2003 AG QL (1 May 2003) Maputo 78–47 1994 AB PR (11 Dec 1994) Johannesburg 53–57 1993 AB PR (21 Dec 1993) Dakar
Tanzania	1	1	0	118	46	+72	Extended content 118–46 1997 AB PR (13 Dec 1997) Nairobi
Tunisia	6	5	1	399	311	+88	Extended content 62–55 2017 AB PR (20 Aug 2017) Bamako 62–56 2009 AB PR (10 Oct 2009) Antananarivo 72–47 2007 AG QF (19 Jul 2007) Algiers 56–54 2003 AB PR (18 Dec 2003) Maputo 51–53 2000 AB PR (8 Nov 2000) Tunis 96–46 1981 AB PR (6 Sep 1981) Dakar
United States	2	0	2	82	209	−127	Extended content 44–119 2014 WC PR (30 Sep 2014) Istanbul 38–90 2012 OL PR (30 Jul 2012) London
Zambia	1	1	0	94	36	+58	Extended content 94–36 2003 AG QL (4 May 2003) Maputo
Zimbabwe	1	1	0	81	37	+44	Extended content 81–37 1994 AB PR (10 Dec 1994) Johannesburg

== Team ==
=== Current roster ===
Roster for the 2025 Women's Afrobasket.

Angola women's national basketball team roster
Players
Coaches

Pos.	No.	Name	Age – Date of birth	Height	Club	Ctr.
SG	1	Italee Lucas	36 – 12 January 1989	1.72 m (5 ft 8 in)	APR WBBC	(Rwanda)
PF	5	Joana António	28 – 11 June 1997	1.90 m (6 ft 3 in)	MTÜ Tallinn	(Estonia)
G	6	Isabel Fernando	25 – 5 June 2000	1.68 m (5 ft 6 in)	Sporting Clube de Luanda	(Angola)
SF	8	Sara Caetano	21 – 9 September 2003	1.72 m (5 ft 8 in)	CRC Quinta dos Lombos	(Portugal)
PG	9	Denise Pascoal	25 – 8 September 1999	1.73 m (5 ft 8 in)	Primeiro de Agosto	(Angola)
G	12	Nelma Cunha	23 – 27 February 2002	1.78 m (5 ft 10 in)	Primeiro de Agosto	(Angola)
SF	13	Cristiana Correia	27 – 30 September 1997	1.85 m (6 ft 1 in)	Sporting Clube de Luanda	(Angola)
PF	14	Angelina Golome	37 – 23 March 1988	1.90 m (6 ft 3 in)	Formigas do Cazenga	(Angola)
G	16	Alexia Dizeko	24 – 12 March 2001	1.83 m (6 ft 0 in)
C	18	Avelina Peso	27 – 15 June 1998	1.87 m (6 ft 2 in)	Primeiro de Agosto	(Angola)
C	20	Cristina Matiquite	33 – 12 March 1992	1.91 m (6 ft 3 in)	Primeiro de Agosto	(Angola)
PG	24	Domilda Lussati	29 – 8 March 1996	1.65 m (5 ft 5 in)	Interclube	(Angola)

Head coach

- (Angola) Paulo Macedo

Assistant coach(es)

- (Angola) Fernando Figueiredo
- (Angola) Jaquelina Francisco

Legend

- Club – describes last
  club before the tournament
- Age – describes age
  on 26 July 2025

=== Head coach position ===
- (Angola) Aníbal Moreira – Sep 2009 – Oct 2014
- (Angola) Jaime Covilhã – Jun 2015 – Aug 2017

== See also ==
- Angola women's national basketball team U-20
- Angola women's national basketball team U-18
- Angola women's national basketball team U-16
