= Ivory Coast women's national basketball team =

National women's basketball team

Ivory Coast
- FIBA ranking: 53 ▼3 (18 March 2026)
- Joined FIBA: 1961
- FIBA zone: FIBA Africa
- National federation: Fédération Ivoirienne de Basket-Ball
- Coach: Stéphane Leite

AfroBasket
- Appearances: 16
Home	Away

The Ivory Coast women's national basketball team is the national team representing Ivory Coast in basketball competitions for women. It is administered by the Fédération Ivoirienne de Basket-Ball.

== AfroBasket Women ==
AfroBasket record
Year	Round	Position	GP	W	L	GS	GA	GD
(Guinea) 1966	did not enter							
(United Arab Republic) 1968	did not enter							
(Tunisia) 1970	did not enter							
(Tunisia) 1974	did not enter							
(Senegal) 1977	Fourth place	4th	6	3	3	252	359	+9
(Somalia) 1979	did not enter							
(Senegal) 1981	Group stage	5th	4	2	2	205	231	−26
(Senegal) 1983	Group Stage	5th	5	1	4	285	372	−203
(Senegal) 1984	did not enter							
(Mozambique) 1986	did not enter							
(Tunisia) 1990	Group stage	6th	3	1	2	211	225	−14
(Senegal) 1993	Group stage	5th	3	1	2	144	223	−79
(South Africa) 1994	Group stage	5th	4	2	2	177	192	−15
(Kenya) 1997	did not enter							
(Senegal) 2000	Group stage	8th	5	1	4	217	249	−32
(Mozambique) 2003	did not enter							
(Nigeria) 2005	did not enter							
(Senegal) 2007	did not enter							
(Madagascar) 2009	Fourth place	4th	8	5	3	453	463	+25
(Mali) 2011	Quarter-finals	8th	8	2	6	501	454	−20
(Mozambique) 2013	Quarter-finals	7th	8	4	4	432	425	−15
(Cameroon) 2015	did not enter							
(Mali) 2017	Quarter-finals	5th	8	4	4	503	507	+256
(Senegal) 2019	Quarter-finals	8th	6	2	4	337	370	−67
(Cameroon) 2021	Quarter-finals	7th	6	3	3	388	363	−78
(Rwanda) 2023	Group stage	11th	3	1	3	245	203	−45
(Ivory Coast) 2025	Quarter-finals	7th	5	3	2	363	357	+6
Total	16/29	0 titles	82	45	48	4713	4993	+90

== Current roster ==
Roster for the 2025 Women's Afrobasket.

Ivory Coast women's national basketball team roster
Players
Coaches
1 z

Pos.	No.	Name	Age – Date of birth	Height	Club	Ctr.
PG	0	Molly Kaiser	23 – 23 July 2002	1.72 m (5 ft 8 in)	New Mexico State Aggies	(United States)
PG	5	Hanna Amani	29 – 11 April 1996	1.66 m (5 ft 5 in)	C.N.S.S.	(Democratic Republic of the Congo)
PF	6	Amma Ouraga	25 – 6 December 1999	1.89 m (6 ft 2 in)	Friend's Basketball Association	(Ivory Coast)
F	7	Djefarina Diawara	30 – 13 September 1994	1.80 m (5 ft 11 in)	Porte du Hainaut	(France)
C	8	Aminata Savadogo	26 – 22 September 1998	1.80 m (5 ft 11 in)	Friend's Basketball Association	(Ivory Coast)
SG	10	Aminata Dosso	26 – 16 January 1999	1.75 m (5 ft 9 in)	COB Calais	(France)
SF	11	Laëtitia Sahie	25 – 26 June 2000	1.89 m (6 ft 2 in)	Le Havre	(France)
PF	13	Fatou Diakite	21 – 13 January 2004	1.90 m (6 ft 3 in)	South Florida Bulls	(United States)
PG	14	Ameryst Alston	31 – 20 January 1994	1.75 m (5 ft 9 in)	Angers Basket	(France)
PF	15	Grace Tolo	24 – 3 January 2001	1.91 m (6 ft 3 in)	Friend's Basketball Association	(Ivory Coast)
F	17	Bougouha Ble	20 – 26 September 2004	1.96 m (6 ft 5 in)	ESB Villeneuve-d'Ascq	(France)
C	22	Kariata Diaby	30 – 29 June 1995	1.93 m (6 ft 4 in)	Tango Bourges Basket	(France)

Head coach

- (France) Stéphane Leite

Assistant coach(es)

- (Ivory Coast) Dénaïmou N'Garsanet
- (Ivory Coast) Sidibé Ousmane

Legend

- Club – describes last
  club before the tournament
- Age – describes age
  on 26 July 2025

== See also ==
- Ivory Coast women's national under-19 basketball team
- Ivory Coast women's national under-16 basketball team
