= 3x3 Basketball at the 2010 Summer Youth Olympics – Girls' tournament =

Basketball at the 2010 Summer Youth Olympics took place at the *scape Youth Space in Singapore.

== Participating teams ==
Group A

- Canada
- Ivory Coast
- South Korea
- Russia
- Vanuatu

Group B

- Angola
- Belarus
- Germany
- Singapore
- United States

Group C

- Brazil
- China
- Czech Republic
- Mali
- Thailand

Group D

- Australia
- Chile
- France
- Italy
- Japan

=== Preliminary round ===
Team advances to Quarterfinals
Team competes in 9th-16th placement matches
Team competes in 17th-20th placement matches

==== Group A ====
Team	Pld	W	L	PF	PA	PD	Pts
Canada	4	4	0	90	45	+45	8
South Korea	4	3	1	83	61	+22	7
Russia	4	2	2	82	51	+31	6
Ivory Coast	4	1	3	55	82	−27	5
Vanuatu	4	0	4	44	115	−71	4

August 15
9:00

Report

Vanuatu	12–27	Canada
Scoring by quarter: 7–16, 5–11
Pts: Izono 10; Rebs: Edgell 6		Pts: Kilpatrick 11; Rebs: Kilpatrick 5 Asts: D Whyte 6

*scape Youth Space, Singapore

August 15
11:00

Report

Russia	16–6	Ivory Coast
Scoring by quarter: 4–4, 12–2
Pts: Antonenko 10; Rebs: Antonenko 7 Asts: Buykina, Mamedova 2		Pts: Boni, Ouattara, Bamba 2 Rebs: Boni, Ouattara 5 Asts: Ouattara 1

*scape Youth Space, Singapore

August 16
9:00

Report

South Korea	22–18	Russia
Scoring by quarter: 8–14, 14–4
Pts: Jeong 14; Rebs: Lee 4 Asts: Kang, Jeong, Cha 1		Pts: Antonenko, Buykina 8 Rebs: Buykina, Kozochkina, Mamedova 4 Asts: Kozochkina 1

*scape Youth Space, Singapore

August 16
11:00

Report

Ivory Coast	22–19	Vanuatu
Scoring by quarter: 13–10, 9–9
Pts: Ouattara 16; Rebs: Boni 9		Pts: Maliliu 10; Rebs: Maliliu 9 Asts: Edgell 2

*scape Youth Space, Singapore

August 17
9:00

Canada	25–12	Ivory Coast
Scoring by quarter: 10–4, 15–8
Pts: D. Whyte 8 Rebs: T. Traore 8 Asts: K. Kilpatrick 1		Pts: F. Bamba 7 Rebs: F. Bamba, K. Quattara 4 Asts: F. Bamba 1

*scape Youth Space, Singapore

August 17
11:00

Vanuatu	8–33	South Korea
Scoring by quarter: 6–24, 2–9
Pts: P. Maliliu 4 Rebs: P. Maliliu 7 Asts: P. Maliliu, L. Edgell 1		Pts: Y. Jeong 12; Rebs: K. Kang 5 Asts: Y. Cha 4

*scape Youth Space, Singapore

August 18
9:00

Russia	33–5	Vanuatu
Scoring by quarter: 15-5, 18-0
Pts: K.Kozochkina 11; Rebs: A.Antonenko 9 Asts: E.Buykina 6		Pts: C.Izono 4 Rebs: P.Maliliu 6

*scape Youth Space, Singapore

August 18
11:00

South Korea	6–20	Canada
Scoring by quarter: 6-9, 0-11
Pts: R.Lee 4 Rebs: Y.Cha 7		Pts: T.Traore 7 Rebs: K.Halvorson, K.Kilpatrick 6 Asts: T.Traore 2

*scape Youth Space, Singapore

August 19
9:00

Ivory Coast	15–22	South Korea
Scoring by quarter: 9-12, 6-10
Pts: S.Boni 6 Rebs: S.Boni 7 Asts: F.Bamba 1		Pts: R.Lee 10; Rebs: Y.Cha 7 Asts: Y.Cha 2

*scape Youth Space, Singapore

August 19
11:00

Canada	18–15	Russia
Scoring by quarter: 6-7, 12-8
Pts: D.Whyte, T.Traore 7 Rebs: T.Traore 7		Pts: K.Kozochkina 5 Rebs: E. Antonenko 6

*scape Youth Space, Singapore

==== Group B ====
Team	Pld	W	L	PF	PA	PD	Pts
United States	4	4	0	130	30	+100	8
Germany	4	3	1	80	85	−5	7
Belarus	4	2	2	85	68	+17	6
Angola	4	1	3	56	105	−49	5
Singapore	4	0	4	56	119	−63	4

August 15
9:30

Report

Singapore	22–33	Germany
Scoring by quarter: 15–22, 7–11
Pts: Ng 7 Rebs: Eng 5 Asts: Eng 1		Pts: Hoffgen 20; Rebs: Hoffgen 8 Asts: Gohlisch 2

*scape Youth Space, Singapore

August 15
11:30

Report

Angola	8–30	United States
Scoring by quarter: 3–15, 5–15
Pts: Afonso 4 Rebs: Afonso 3		Pts: Stokes 11; Rebs: Canty 5 Asts: Canty 5

*scape Youth Space, Singapore

August 16
9:30

Report

Angola	11–35	Belarus
Scoring by quarter: 11–18, 0–17
Pts: Afonso 5 Rebs: Afonso, Gonçalves 4 Asts: Afonso 1		Pts: Baklaha 18; Rebs: Bohdan 10; Asts: Bohdan, Lipinskaya 2

*scape Youth Space, Singapore

August 16
11:30

Report

United States	34–11	Singapore
Scoring by quarter: 16-7, 18-4
Pts: Stokes; Rebs: Carter, Canty 2 Asts: Canty 5		Pts: Ng 9 Rebs: Ng, Eng 3 Asts: Eng 1

*scape Youth Space, Singapore

August 157
9:30

Germany	6–33	United States
Scoring by quarter: 4-26, 2-7
Pts: Grasshoff 5 Rebs: Gohlisch 4		Pts: Henson 14; Rebs: Carter 6 Asts: Canty 4

*scape Youth Space, Singapore

August 17
11:30

Singapore	9–32	Belarus
Scoring by quarter: 6-15, 3-18
Pts: Ng 5 Rebs: Tok 4 Asts: Eng 2		Pts: Bohdan 23; Rebs: Bohdan 11; Asts: Baklaha 2

*scape Youth Space, Singapore

August 18
9:30

Angola	20–14	Singapore
Scoring by quarter: 10-6, 10-8
Pts: Afonso 9 Rebs: Goncalves 6		Pts: Tok 6 Rebs: Eng 9 Asts: Tok, Ng 1

*scape Youth Space, Singapore

August 18
11:30

Belarus	13–15	Germany
Scoring by quarter: 10-5, 3-10
Pts: Baklaha 5 Rebs: Nialepka 4		Pts: Gohlisch 8 Rebs: Gohlisch 11; Asts: Gohlisch 1

*scape Youth Space, Singapore

August 19
9:30

United States	33–5	Belarus

August 19
11:30

Germany	26–17	Angola

==== Group C ====
Team	Pld	W	L	PF	PA	PD	Pts
China	4	4	0	127	68	+59	8
Brazil	4	3	1	119	77	+42	7
Czech Republic	4	2	2	106	97	+9	6
Mali	4	2	2	57	117	−60	5
Thailand	4	0	4	66	116	−50	4

August 15
10:00

Report

Thailand	13–34	China
Scoring by quarter: 12–16, 1–18
Pts: Buapa 6 Rebs: Buapa, Sawatong 3 Asts: Maihom 1		Pts: Ma 16; Rebs: Ma, Yang 7 Asts: Shen 9

*scape Youth Space, Singapore

August 15
12:00

Report

Mali	8–33	Czech Republic
Scoring by quarter: 3–17, 5–16
Pts: Toure 6 Rebs: Konate 4 Asts: Kanoute 1		Pts: Mervinska, Vackova 9 Rebs: Brhelova, Vojtkova 5 Asts: Vackova, Vojtkova 3

*scape Youth Space, Singapore

August 16
10:00

Report

Brazil	30–26	Czech Republic
Scoring by quarter: 15-12, 15-14
Pts: Coelho 13; Rebs: Macedo 4 Asts: Leite 2		Pts: Vojtkova 16; Rebs: Vackova 10; Asts: Brhelova, Vackova 2

*scape Youth Space, Singapore

August 16
12:00

Report

Mali	23–18	Thailand
Scoring by quarter: 8-8, 15-10
Pts: Konate 12; Rebs: Konate 9 Asts: Guindo 3		Pts: Maihom 9 Rebs: Buapa 4 Asts: Sawatong 2

*scape Youth Space, Singapore

August 17
10:00

China	32–12	Mali

August 17
12:00

Thailand	9–31	Brazil

August 18
10:00

Czech Republic	28–26	Thailand

August 18
12:00

Brazil	24–28	China

August 19
10:00

Mali	14–34	Brazil

August 19
12:00

China	33–19	Czech Republic

==== Group D ====
Team	Pld	W	L	PF	PA	PD	Pts	Co
Australia	4	3	1	78	56	+22	7	+7
Japan	4	3	1	92	73	+19	7	−2
Italy	4	3	1	88	65	+23	7	−5
France	4	1	3	76	96	−20	5	
Chile	4	0	4	49	93	−44	4	

August 15
10:30

Report

Australia	18–9	Chile
Scoring by quarter: 15-0, 3-9
Pts: Bontempelli 9 Rebs: Fadljevic 6		Pts: Vasquez 4 Rebs: Garcia 7 Asts: Vasquez 1

*scape Youth Space, Singapore

August 15
12:30

Report

Italy	26–11	France
Scoring by quarter: 14-4, 12-7
Pts: C Dotto 14; Rebs: F Dotto 3 Asts: F Dotto 3		Pts: Eduardo 4 Rebs: Sbahi 4 Asts: Sbahi 1

*scape Youth Space, Singapore

August 16
10:30

Report

Japan	17–26	Italy
Scoring by quarter: 15-18, 2-12
Pts: Nagaoka 12; Rebs: Nagaoka 9 Asts: Itaya 1		Pts: F Dotto 11; Rebs: F Dotto 8 Asts: Masoni 2

*scape Youth Space, Singapore

August 16
12:30

Report

France	15–21	Australia
Scoring by quarter: 7-8, 8-13
Pts: Sbahi 7 Rebs: Sbahi, Mataly, Eduardo 4 Asts: Sbahi 1		Pts: Bontempelli 12; Rebs: Donnelly, Fadljevic 5 Asts: Kaser 1

*scape Youth Space, Singapore

August 17
10:30

Chile	15–30	France

*scape Youth Space, Singapore

August 17
12:30

Australia	10–17	Japan

*scape Youth Space, Singapore

August 18
10:30

Italy	15–29	Australia

*scape Youth Space, Singapore

August 18
12:30

Japan	24–17	Chile

*scape Youth Space, Singapore

August 19
10:30

France	20–34	Japan

*scape Youth Space, Singapore

August 19
12:30

Chile	8–21	Italy

*scape Youth Space, Singapore

== Placement games ==
=== 17th–20th ===
This round will be contested by the 5th-place finishers of each group to compete for 17th to 20th positions.

Team	Pld	W	L	PF	PA	PD	Pts
Thailand	3	3	0	87	56	+31	6
Chile	3	2	1	46	52	–6	5
Singapore	3	1	2	69	55	+14	4
Vanuatu	3	0	3	38	76	–38	3

21 August

Vanuatu	10–26	Singapore

21 August

Thailand	24–13	Chile

22 August

Chile	17–13	Vanuatu

22 August

Singapore	28–29	Thailand

23 August

Vanuatu	15–33	Thailand

23 August

Chile	16–15	Singapore

=== 9th–16th ===
Quarter-finals
August 21
Russia	28
Angola	14
August 21
Czech Republic	24
France	29
August 21
Belarus	33
Ivory Coast	7
August 21
Italy	29
Mali	18

Semi-finals
August 22
Russia	12
France	22
August 22
Belarus	28
Italy	29

Final
August 23
France	18
Italy	26
Third place
August 23
Russia	21
Belarus	18

Semi-finals
August 22
Angola	15
Czech Republic	18
August 22
Ivory Coast	13
Mali	17

Thirteenth place
August 23
Czech Republic	32
Mali	12
Fifteenth place
August 23
Angola	13
Ivory Coast	15

21 August

Russia	28–14	Angola

21 August

Belarus	33–7	Ivory Coast

21 August

Czech Republic	24–29	France

21 August

Italy	29–18	Mali

==== 13th–16th ====
22 August

Angola	15–18	Czech Republic

22 August

Ivory Coast	13–17	Mali

===== 15th place playoff =====
23 August

Angola	13–15	Ivory Coast

===== 13th place playoff =====
23 August

Czech Republic	32–12	Mali

==== 9th–12th ====
22 August

Russia	12–22	France

22 August

Belarus	28–29	Italy

===== 11th place playoff =====
23 August

Russia	21–18	Belarus

===== 9th place playoff =====
23 August

France	18–26	Italy

== Final round ==
This stage will be contested by the top 2 teams from each group to compete for 1st to 8th positions.

Quarter-finals
August 21
Canada	33
Germany	15
August 21
China	26
Japan	23
August 21
United States	34
South Korea	10
August 21
Australia	23
Brazil	20

Semi-finals
August 22
Canada	21
China	28
August 22
United States	23
Australia	25

Final
August 23
China	33
Australia	29
Third place
August 23
Canada	16
United States	34

Semi-finals
August 22
Germany	18
Japan	28
August 22
South Korea	13
Brazil	28

Fifth place
August 23
Japan	32
Brazil	29
Seventh place
August 23
Germany	17
South Korea	18

=== Quarter-finals ===
21 August

Canada	33–15	Germany

21 August

United States	34–10	South Korea

21 August

China	26–23	Japan

21 August

Australia	23–20	Brazil

=== 5th–8th ===
22 August

Germany	18–28	Japan

22 August

South Korea	13–28	Brazil

==== 7th place playoff ====
23 August

Germany	17–18	South Korea

==== 5th place playoff ====
23 August

Japan	32–29	Brazil

=== Semifinals ===
22 August

Canada	21–28	China

22 August

United States	23–25	Australia

=== Bronze-medal game ===
23 August

Canada	16–34	United States

=== Final ===
23 August

China	33–29	Australia

== Final standings ==
Rank	Team
Gold medal	China
Silver medal	Australia
Bronze medal	United States
4	Canada
5	Japan
6	Brazil
7	South Korea
8	Germany
9	Italy
10	France
11	Russia
12	Belarus
13	Czech Republic
14	Mali
15	Ivory Coast
16	Angola
17	Thailand
18	Chile
19	Singapore
20	Vanuatu
