= 1996 FIBA Africa Under-18 Championship for Women =

1996 FIBA U18 Women's AfroBasket
4th FIBA Under-18 Women's African Basketball Championship

Tournament details
- Host country: Mozambique
- Dates: September 25–28, 1996
- Teams: 2 (from 53 federations)
- Venue: 1 (in 1 host city)

Final positions
- Champions: Mali (1st title)

Official website
- 1996 FIBA Africa Under-18 Championship for Women

The 1996 FIBA Africa Under-18 Championship for Women was the 4th FIBA Africa Under-18 Championship for Women, played under the rules of FIBA, the world governing body for basketball, and the FIBA Africa thereof. The tournament was hosted by Mozambique from September 25 to 28, 1996.

Out of the three teams that were to participate in the tournament, only Mali and Mozambique actually competed. The third team, Zaire, forfeited all their matches. A preliminary match was played by both teams followed by a final, both won by Mali.

As the winner, Mali qualified for the 1997 FIBA U19 Women's World Cup.

== Participating teams ==
Mali
Mozambique

== Preliminary round ==
P	Team	M	W	L	PF	PA	Diff	Pts.
1	Mali	1	1	0	67	59	+8	2
2	Mozambique	1	0	1	59	67	-8	1

September 25

Boxscore

Mali	67–59	Mozambique
Scoring by half: 39-30, 28-29

Maputo

== Final ==
September 28

Boxscore

Mali	80–69	Mozambique
Scoring by half: 37-27, 43-42

Maputo

== Final standings ==
Qualified for the 1997 FIBA U19 Women's World Cup

Rank	Team	Record
Gold medal	Mali	2–0
Silver medal	Mozambique	0–2

== Awards ==
1996 FIBA Africa Under-18 Championship for Women winner

Mali
First title

Most Valuable Player

== See also ==
- 1997 FIBA Africa Championship for Women
