= Fatou N'Diaye =

Fatou N'Diaye may refer to:

- Fatou N'Diaye (actress), Senegalese actress
- Fatou N'Diaye (basketball), French-Senegalese basketball player
- Fatou Ndiaye Sow, Senegalese poet, teacher and children's writer
