= Mauritian women's national basketball team =

The Mauritian women's national basketball team represents Mauritius in international women's basketball competitions. The team is managed by the Mauritius Basketball Federation and competes in international tournaments and friendly matches against other national teams. Their greatest achievement was finishing twelfth at the 2009 FIBA Africa Women's Championship. The national federation joined the international governing body, the International Basketball Federation (FIBA), in 1959. As of June 2014, the team was ranked 73rd in the Women's FIBA World Rankings.

== International competitions ==
=== Mauritius at World Championships ===
The team has not qualified for any Women's Basketball World Cup.

=== Mauritius at Olympic Games ===
The team has not qualified for any Olympic basketball competitions.

=== Mauritius at FIBA Africa Championships (AfroBasket) ===
The team's participation in the FIBA Africa Championship is as follows:

- Guinea: Did not qualify
- Egypt: Did not qualify
- Togo: Did not qualify
- Tunisia: Did not qualify
- Senegal: Did not qualify
- Somalia: Did not qualify
- Senegal: Did not qualify
- Angola: Did not qualify
- Senegal: Did not qualify
- Mozambique: Did not qualify
- Tunisia: Did not qualify
- Senegal: Did not qualify
- South Africa: Did not qualify
- Kenya: Did not qualify
- Tunisia: Did not qualify
- Mozambique: Did not qualify
- Nigeria: Did not qualify
- Senegal: Did not qualify
- Madagascar: 12th place
- Mali: Did not qualify
- Mozambique: Did not qualify
- Cameroon: Did not qualify
- Mali: Did not qualify
- Senegal: Did not qualify
- Cameroon: Did not qualify
- Rwanda: Did not qualify

=== Mauritius at the African Games ===
The Mauritian women's national basketball team has not yet appeared in the basketball tournaments at the African Games.
