= 2000 FIBA Africa Championship for Women =

2000 FIBA Women's AfroBasket
15th FIBA Women's African Basketball Championship

Tournament details
- Host country: Tunisia
- Dates: November 5–12
- Teams: 10 (from 53 federations)
- Venue: 1 (in 1 host city)

Final positions
- Champions: Senegal (9th title)

Tournament statistics
- MVP: (Senegal) Mame Maty Mbengue

Official website
- 2000 FIBA Africa Championship for Women

The 2000 FIBA Africa Championship for Women was the 15th FIBA Africa Championship for Women, played under the rules of FIBA, the world governing body for basketball, and the FIBA Africa thereof. The tournament was hosted by Tunisia from November 5 to 12, 2000.

Senegal defeated Tunisia 71–63 in the final to win their first title. with both winner and runner-up securing a spot at the 2002 FIBA World Cup.

== Draw ==
Group A	Group B
Angola; DR Congo; Egypt; Niger; Tunisia	Ivory Coast; Mali; Morocco; Mozambique; Senegal

== Preliminary round ==
=== Group A ===
Qualified for the semi-finals

Team	Pts.	W	L	PF	PA	Diff
Tunisia	8	4	0	318	217	+101
DR Congo	7	3	1	444	264	+180
Angola	6	2	2	370	231	+139
Egypt	5	1	3	319	301	-18
Niger	4	0	4	155	593	-438

November 5

Tunisia	131–42	Niger

Tunis

November 6

DR Congo	94–79	Egypt

Tunis

November 7

Tunisia	61–56	DR Congo

Tunis

Angola	80–72	Egypt

Tunis

November 8

Niger	39–208	DR Congo

Tunis

Angola	51–53	Tunisia

Tunis

November 9

Niger	20–154	Angola

Tunis

Egypt	68–73	Tunisia

Tunis

November 10

Egypt	100–54	Niger

Tunis

DR Congo	86–85	Angola

Tunis

=== Group B ===
Qualified for the semi-finals

Team	Pts.	W	L	PF	PA	Diff
Senegal	8	4	0	284	197	+87
Morocco	7	3	1	266	243	+23
Mozambique	6	2	2	209	233	-24
Ivory Coast	5	1	3	217	249	-32
Mali	4	0	4	228	282	-54

November 6

Senegal	67–55	Morocco

Tunis

Mali	39–60	Mozambique

Tunis

November 7

Ivory Coast	52–58	Mozambique

Tunis

Senegal	73–56	Mali

Tunis

November 8

Morocco	84–71	Mali

Tunis

Ivory Coast	47–63	Senegal

Tunis

November 9

Mozambique	39–81	Senegal

Tunis

Morocco	66–53	Ivory Coast

Tunis

November 10

Mozambique	52–61	Morocco

Tunis

Mali	62–65	Ivory Coast

Tunis

== Knockout stage ==
=== 9th place match ===
November 11

Mali	96–28	Niger

Tunis

=== 7th place match ===
November 11

Egypt	80–76	Ivory Coast

Tunis

=== 5th place match ===
November 12

Angola	68–62	Mozambique

Tunis

=== Semifinals bracket ===
Semi-finals
November 11
Senegal	85
DR Congo	72
November 11
Tunisia	56
Morocco	54

Final
November 12
Senegal	71
Tunisia	63
Third place
November 12
DR Congo	80
Morocco	79

=== Semifinals ===
November 11

Senegal	85–72	DR Congo

Tunis

Tunisia	56–54	Morocco

Tunis

=== Bronze medal match ===
November 12

DR Congo	80–79	Morocco

Tunis

=== Final ===
November 12

Senegal	71–63	Tunisia

Tunis

== Final standings ==
Qualified for the 2002 FIBA Women's World Cup

Rank	Team	Record
1st place, gold medalist(s)	Senegal	6–0
2nd place, silver medalist(s)	Tunisia	5–1
3rd place, bronze medalist(s)	DR Congo	4–2
4	Morocco	3–3
5	Angola	3–2
6	Mozambique	2–3
7	Egypt	2–3
8	Ivory Coast	1–4
9	Mali	1–4
10	Niger	0–5

== Awards ==
2000 FIBA Africa Championship for Women winners

Senegal
Ninth title

Most Valuable Player
(Senegal) Mame Maty Mbengue
