= 1990 FIBA Africa Championship for Women =

1990 FIBA Women's AfroBasket
11th FIBA Women's African Basketball Championship

Tournament details
- Host country: Tunisia
- Dates: March 17–24, 1990
- Teams: 8 (from 53 federations)
- Venue: 1 (in 1 host city)

Final positions
- Champions: Senegal (6th title)

Official website
- 1990 FIBA Africa Championship for Women

The 1990 FIBA Africa Championship for Women was the 11th FIBA Africa Championship for Women, played under the rules of FIBA, the world governing body for basketball, and the FIBA Africa thereof. The tournament was hosted by Tunisia from March 17 to 24, 1990.

Senegal defeated Zaire 70–68 in the final to win their sixth title with both winner and runner-up qualifying for the 1990 FIBA Women's World Cup.

== Draw ==
Group A	Group B
Algeria; Ivory Coast; Mozambique; Tunisia	Angola; Egypt; Senegal; Zaire

== Preliminary round ==
=== Group A ===
Qualified for the semi-finals

Team	Pts.	W	L	PF	PA	Diff
Tunisia	6	3	0	276	207	+69
Mozambique	5	2	1	236	178	+58
Ivory Coast	4	1	2	211	225	-14
Algeria	3	0	3	169	282	-113

March 17, 1990

Boxscore

Tunisia	109–68	Algeria
Scoring by half: 42-33, 67-35

Tunis

March 18, 1990

Boxscore

Mozambique	75–60	Ivory Coast
Scoring by half: 35-35, 40-25

Tunis

March 19, 1990

Boxscore

Ivory Coast	85–59	Algeria
Scoring by half: 48-24, 37-35

Tunis

March 20, 1990

Boxscore

Tunisia	76–73	Mozambique
Scoring by half: 43-39, 33-34

Tunis

March 21, 1990

Boxscore

Mozambique	88–42	Algeria
Scoring by half: 44-22, 44-20

Tunis

Boxscore

Tunisia	91–66	Ivory Coast
Scoring by half: 45-37, 46-29

Tunis

=== Group B ===
Qualified for the semi-finals

Team	Pts.	W	L	PF	PA	Diff
Zaire	6	3	0	215	152	+63
Senegal	5	2	1	186	167	+19
Angola	4	1	2	175	171	+4
Egypt	3	0	3	137	223	-86

March 17, 1990

Boxscore

Zaire	65–55	Senegal
Scoring by half: 32-28, 33-27

Tunis

March 18, 1990

Boxscore

Angola	72–41	Egypt
Scoring by half: 35-24, 37-17

Tunis

March 19, 1990

Boxscore

Senegal	65–48	Egypt
Scoring by half: 28-26, 37-22

Tunis

March 20, 1990

Boxscore

Zaire	64–49	Angola
Scoring by half: 37-27, 27-22

Tunis

March 21, 1990

Boxscore

Zaire	86–48	Egypt
Scoring by half: 40-23, 46-25

Tunis

Boxscore

Senegal	66–54	Angola
Scoring by half: 35-30, 31-24

Tunis

== Knockout stage ==
Semi-finals
March 22, 1990
Senegal	89
Tunisia	65
March 22, 1990
Zaire	91
Mozambique	59

Final
March 24, 1990
Senegal	70
Zaire	68
Third place
March 24, 1990
Mozambique	86
Tunisia	75

=== Semifinals ===
March 22, 1990

Boxscore

Zaire	91–59	Mozambique
Scoring by half: 37-35, 54-24

Tunis

March 22, 1990

Boxscore

Senegal	89–65	Tunisia
Scoring by half: 40-39, 49-26

Tunis

=== 7th place match ===
March 23, 1990

Boxscore

Egypt	64–58	Algeria
Scoring by half: 36-32, 28-26

Tunis

=== 5th place match ===
March 23, 1990

Boxscore

Angola	93–62	Ivory Coast
Scoring by half: 55-23, 38-39

Tunis

=== Bronze medal match ===
March 24, 1990

Boxscore

Mozambique	86–75	Tunisia
Scoring by half: 43-38, 43-37

Tunis

=== Final ===
March 24, 1990

Boxscore

Senegal	70–68	Zaire
Scoring by half: 34-30, 36-38

Tunis

== Final standings ==
Qualified for the 1990 FIBA Women's World Cup and Pre-Olympic Basketball

Rank	Team	Record
Gold medal	Senegal	4–1
Silver medal	Zaire	4–1
Bronze medal	Mozambique	3–2
4	Tunisia	3–2
5	Angola	2–2
6	Ivory Coast	1–3
7	Egypt	1–3
8	Algeria	0–4

== Awards ==
1990 FIBA Africa Championship for Women winners

Senegal
Sixth title

Most Valuable Player
