= Madagascar women's national basketball team =

Madagascar
- FIBA ranking: NR (14 September 2026)
- Joined FIBA: 1963
- FIBA zone: FIBA Africa
- National federation: Madagascar Basketball Federation

World Cup
- Appearances: 1

AfroBasket
- Appearances: 3
- Medals: (1970)
Home	Away

The Madagascar women's national basketball team is the nationally controlled basketball team representing Madagascar at international basketball competitions for women. The squad won the African championship in 1970.

It is administered by the Fédération Malagasy de Basket-Ball.

== Results ==
=== World Cup ===
- 1971 – 12th place

=== AfroBasket ===
- 1970 – 1st place
- 2007 – 10th place
- 2009 – 8th place

== See also ==
- Madagascar women's national under-16 basketball team
