= 1981 FIBA Africa Championship for Women =

1981 FIBA Women's AfroBasket
7th FIBA Women's African Basketball Championship

Tournament details
- Host country: Senegal
- Dates: September 5–12, 1981
- Teams: 8 (from 53 federations)
- Venue: 1 (in 1 host city)

Final positions
- Champions: Senegal (4th title)

Tournament statistics
- MVP: (Angola) Adriana Sebastião
- Top scorer: (Zaire) Longanza Kamimbaya 26

Official website
- 1981 FIBA Africa Championship for Women

The 1981 FIBA Africa Championship for Women was the 7th FIBA Africa Championship for Women. It was played under the rules of FIBA, the world governing body for basketball, and the FIBA Africa thereof. The tournament was hosted in 1981 by Senegal from September 5 to 12.

Senegal defeated Zaire 83–76 in the final.

== Draw ==
Group A	Group B
Ivory Coast; Mali; Nigeria; Senegal	Algeria; Angola; Tunisia; Zaire

== Preliminary round ==
=== Group A ===
Qualified for the semi-finals

Team	Pts.	W	L	PF	PA	Diff
Senegal	6	3	0	279	162	+117
Mali	5	2	1	203	208	-5
Ivory Coast	4	1	2	205	231	-26
Nigeria	3	0	3	162	248	-86

September 5, 1981

Boxscore

Senegal	104–55	Nigeria
Scoring by half: 52-30, 52-25

Dakar

Boxscore

Mali	80–77	Ivory Coast
Scoring by half: 30-40, 50-37

Dakar

September 6, 1981

Boxscore

Senegal	97–62	Ivory Coast
Scoring by half: 33-25, 64-37

Dakar

Boxscore

Mali	78–53	Nigeria
Scoring by half: 34-29, 44-24

Dakar

September 8, 1981

Boxscore

Ivory Coast	66–54	Nigeria
Scoring by half: 27-32, 39-22

Dakar

Boxscore

Senegal	78–45	Mali
Scoring by half: 36-27, 42-18

Dakar

=== Group B ===
Qualified for the semi-finals

Team	Pts.	W	L	PF	PA	Diff
Zaire	6	3	0	259	191	+68
Angola	5	2	1	244	166	+78
Tunisia	4	1	2	157	227	-70
Algeria	3	0	3	171	247	-76

September 5, 1981

Boxscore

Angola	86–52	Algeria
Scoring by half: 46-30, 40-22

Dakar

Boxscore

Zaire	81–60	Tunisia
Scoring by half: 47-19, 34-41

Dakar

September 6, 1981

Boxscore

Angola	96–46	Tunisia
Scoring by half: 47-25, 49-21

Dakar

Boxscore

Zaire	110–69	Algeria
Scoring by half: 58-27, 52-42

Dakar

September 8, 1981

Boxscore

Tunisia	51–50	Algeria
Scoring by half: 24-29, 27-21

Dakar

Boxscore

Zaire	68–62	Angola
Scoring by half: 34-37, 34-25

Dakar

== Knockout stage ==
Semi-finals
September 12, 1981
Senegal	88
Angola	39
September 12, 1981
Zaire	76
Mali	74

Final
September 12, 1981
Senegal	83
Zaire	76
Third place
September 11, 1981
Angola	83
Mali	71

=== Semifinals ===
September 10, 1981

Boxscore

Senegal	88–39	Angola
Scoring by half: 47-18, 41-21

Dakar

Boxscore

Zaire	76–74	Mali
Scoring by half: 40-31, 36-43

Dakar

=== 7th place match ===
September 11, 1981

Boxscore

Nigeria	53–32	Algeria
Scoring by half: 19-16, 34-16

Dakar

=== 5th place match ===
September 11, 1981

Boxscore

Ivory Coast	93–70	Tunisia
Scoring by half: 35-34, 58-36

Dakar

=== Bronze medal match ===
September 11, 1981

Boxscore

Angola	83–71	Mali
Scoring by half: 43-26, 40-45

Dakar

=== Final ===
September 12, 1981

Boxscore

Senegal	83–76	Zaire
Scoring by half: 41-43, 42-33

Dakar

== Final standings ==
Rank	Team	Record
Gold medal	Senegal	5–0
Silver medal	Zaire	4–1
Bronze medal	Angola	3–2
4	Mali	2–3
5	Ivory Coast	2–2
6	Tunisia	1–3
7	Nigeria	1–3
8	Algeria	0–4

== Awards ==
1981 FIBA Africa Championship for Women winners

Senegal
Fourth title

Most Valuable Player
(Angola) Adriana Sebastião
