= Somalia women's national basketball team =

Somalia
- FIBA ranking: NR (14 September 2026)
- Joined FIBA: 1960
- FIBA zone: FIBA Africa
- National federation: Somali Basketball Federation
- Coach: Mohamed Sheekh

AfroBasket
- Appearances: 2
- Medals: Silver: 1979
Home	Away

The Somalia women's national basketball team represents Somalia in international competitions. It is administered by the Somali Basketball Federation.

== History ==
In 2006, the Somali Islamic Courts Union (ICU) which briefly ruled Somalia imposed a ban on women's sports.

=== 2011 Pan Arab Games ===
On 8 December 2011, the Somalia women's national basketball team had a 90–24 loss to the Egypt women's national basketball team in the Pan Arab Games at Doha. The Somali team trained at the Mogadishu Police Academy. Despite being the second most popular sport in Somalia, women's participation in basketball was opposed by some. The women had to travel to their training in burkas, playing their games in tracksuits with towels covering their heads. The team received death threats from Islamic extremist group Al-Shaabab.

On 12 December 2011, Somalia won against hosts Qatar 67–57, in what CNN called a "hotly contested match". Others noted that the victory had put Somali women "on par with football" in opposing the suppression of sports for both men and women.

== AfroBasket record ==
- 1968 – 5th place
- 1979 – 2nd place

== Key players ==
Player Manal Cali received an award at an event in London organised by the Somali Federation of Sports Associations for her role in the team.
