= 1983 FIBA Africa Championship for Women =

1983 FIBA Women's AfroBasket
8th FIBA Women's African Basketball Championship

Tournament details
- Host country: Angola
- Dates: April 3–8, 1983
- Teams: 6 (from 53 federations)
- Venue: 1 (in 1 host city)

Final positions
- Champions: Zaire (1st title)

Official website
- 1983 FIBA Africa Championship for Women

The 1983 FIBA Africa Championship for Women was the 8th FIBA Africa Championship for Women, played under the rules of FIBA, the world governing body for basketball, and the FIBA Africa thereof. The tournament was hosted by Angola from April 3 to 8, 1983, with the games played at the Pavilhão da Cidadela in Luanda.

Zaire ended the round-robin tournament with a 5–0 unbeaten record to win their first title and qualify for the 1983 FIBA Women's World Championship.

== Participating teams ==
Angola
Cameroon
Ivory Coast
Mozambique
Senegal
Zaire

== Schedule ==
P	Team	M	W	L	PF	PA	Diff	Pts.
1	Zaire	5	5	0	374	280	+150	8
2	Senegal	5	4	1	412	267	+45	7
3	Cameroon	5	3	2	338	358	+61	6
4	Mozambique	5	1	4	301	360	-53	5
5	Ivory Coast	5	1	4	285	372	-203	4
6	Angola	5	1	4	277	350	-203	4

3 April 1983

Boxscore

Zaire	73–53	Ivory Coast
Scoring by half: 31-26, 42-27

Pavilhão da Cidadela, Luanda

Boxscore

Cameroon	71–58	Mozambique
Scoring by half: 36-25, 35-33

Pavilhão da Cidadela, Luanda

Boxscore

Senegal	86–38	Angola
Scoring by half: 49-16, 37-22

Pavilhão da Cidadela, Luanda

4 April 1983

Boxscore

Angola	59–56	Mozambique
Scoring by half: 31-25, 28-31

Pavilhão da Cidadela, Luanda

Boxscore

Senegal	85–42	Ivory Coast
Scoring by half: 41-20, 44-22

Pavilhão da Cidadela, Luanda

Boxscore

Zaire	82–47	Cameroon
Scoring by half: 50-15, 32-32

Pavilhão da Cidadela, Luanda

6 April 1983

Boxscore

Zaire	76–55	Mozambique
Scoring by half: 43-28, 33-27

Pavilhão da Cidadela, Luanda

Boxscore

Ivory Coast	59–55	Angola
Scoring by half: 32-27, 27-28

Pavilhão da Cidadela, Luanda

Boxscore

Senegal	83–51	Cameroon
Scoring by half: 41-34, 42-17

Pavilhão da Cidadela, Luanda

7 April 1983

Boxscore

Cameroon	91–67	Ivory Coast
Scoring by half: 35-20, 56-47

Pavilhão da Cidadela, Luanda

Boxscore

Senegal	90–64	Mozambique
Scoring by half: 45-28, 45-36

Pavilhão da Cidadela, Luanda

Boxscore

Zaire	71–57	Angola
Scoring by half: 31-24, 40-33

Pavilhão da Cidadela, Luanda

8 April 1983

Boxscore

Cameroon	78–68	Angola
Scoring by half: 42-31, 36-37

Pavilhão da Cidadela, Luanda

Boxscore

Mozambique	68–64	Ivory Coast
Scoring by half: 43-28, 25-36

Pavilhão da Cidadela, Luanda

Boxscore

Zaire	72–68	Senegal
Scoring by half: 37-30, 37-38

Pavilhão da Cidadela, Luanda

== Final standings ==
Qualified for the 1983 FIBA Women's World Cup

Rank	Team	Record
Gold medal	Zaire	5–0
Silver medal	Senegal	4–1
Bronze medal	Cameroon	3–2
4	Mozambique	1–4
5	Ivory Coast	1–4
6	Angola	1–4

Zaire roster
Bompoco Lomboto, Evoluko Bokele, Kamanga Kasala, Komichelo Kayumba, Lingenda Liyoko, Longanza Kamimbaya, Nguya Nakwete, Coach: Ngoie wa Ngoie

== Awards ==
1983 FIBA Africa Championship for Women winners

Zaire
First title

Most Valuable Player
