= 1993 FIBA Africa Championship for Women =

1993 FIBA Women's AfroBasket
12th FIBA Women's African Basketball Championship

Tournament details
- Host country: Senegal
- Dates: December 18–28, 1993
- Teams: 9 (from 53 federations)
- Venue: 1 (in 1 host city)

Final positions
- Champions: Senegal (7th title)

Official website
- 1993 FIBA Africa Championship for Women

The 1993 FIBA Africa Championship for Women was the 12th FIBA Africa Championship for Women, played under the rules of FIBA, the world governing body for basketball, and the FIBA Africa thereof. The tournament was hosted by Senegal from December 18 to 28, 1993.

Senegal defeated Kenya 89–43 in the final to win their seventh title with both winner and runner-up qualifying for the 1994 FIBA Women's World Cup. Senegal later withdrew.

== Draw ==
Group A	Group B
Ivory Coast; Kenya; Mali; Senegal	Angola; Congo; Mozambique; South Africa; Zaire

== Preliminary round ==
=== Group A ===
Qualified for the semi-finals

Team	Pts.	W	L	PF	PA	Diff
Senegal	6	3	0	233	113	+120
Kenya	5	2	1	165	154	+11
Ivory Coast	4	1	2	144	223	-79
Mali	3	0	3	147	199	-52

December 18, 1993

Boxscore

Senegal	65–37	Kenya
Scoring by half: 38-21, 27-16

Dakar

December 19, 1993

Boxscore

Kenya	68–45	Ivory Coast
Scoring by half: 24-20, 44-25

Dakar

December 20, 1993

Boxscore

Senegal	75–41	Mali
Scoring by half: 31-24, 44-17

Dakar

December 21, 1993

Boxscore

Ivory Coast	64–62	Mali
Scoring by half: 31-24, 33-38

Dakar

December 22, 1993

Boxscore

Senegal	93–35	Ivory Coast
Scoring by half: 47-16, 46-19

Dakar

Boxscore

Kenya	60–44	Mali
Scoring by half: 33-27, 27-17

Dakar

=== Group B ===
Qualified for the semi-finals

Team	Pts.	W	L	PF	PA	Diff
Zaire	8	4	0	288	175	+113
Mozambique	6	2	2	293	251	+42
Angola	6	2	2	265	245	+20
South Africa	6	2	2	237	277	-40
Congo	4	0	4	198	333	-135

December 18, 1993

Boxscore

Zaire	71–51	Angola
Scoring by half: 27-18, 44-33

Dakar

Boxscore

Mozambique	94–47	Congo
Scoring by half: 58-22, 36-25

Dakar

December 19, 1993

Boxscore

Angola	101–63	Congo
Scoring by half: 51-31, 50-32

Dakar

Boxscore

Zaire	73–42	South Africa
Scoring by half: 39-16, 34-26

Dakar

December 20, 1993

Boxscore

Mozambique	96–79	South Africa
Scoring by half: 44-21, 52-58

Dakar

Boxscore

Zaire	79–33	Congo
Scoring by half: 42-17, 37-16

Dakar

December 21, 1993

Boxscore

South Africa	57–53	Angola
Scoring by half: 27-24, 30-29

Dakar

Boxscore

Zaire	65–49	Mozambique
Scoring by half: 28-27, 37-22

Dakar

December 22, 1993

Boxscore

Angola	60–54	Mozambique
Scoring by half: 25-29, 35-25

Dakar

Boxscore

South Africa	59–55	Congo
Scoring by half: 21-28, 38-27

Dakar

== Knockout stage ==
Semi-finals
December 26, 1993
Senegal	72
Mozambique	36
December 26, 1993
Kenya	64
Zaire	53

Final
December 28, 1993
Senegal	89
Kenya	43
Third place
December 28, 1993
Mozambique	63
Zaire	57

=== Semifinals ===
December 26, 1993

Boxscore

Senegal	72–36	Mozambique
Scoring by half: 33-18, 39-18

Dakar

Boxscore

Kenya	64–53	Zaire
Scoring by half: 31-29, 33-24

Dakar

=== 7th place match ===
December 27, 1993

Boxscore

Mali	77–62	South Africa
Scoring by half: 40-31, 37-31

Dakar

=== 5th place match ===
December 27, 1993

Boxscore

Ivory Coast	67–56	Angola
Scoring by half: 24-31, 43-25

Dakar

=== Bronze medal match ===
December 28, 1993

[ Boxscore]

Mozambique	63–57	Zaire
Scoring by half: 22-25, 41-32

Dakar

=== Final ===
December 28, 1993

Boxscore

Senegal	89–43	Kenya
Scoring by half: 44-24, 45-19

Dakar

== Final standings ==
Qualified for the 1994 FIBA Women's World Cup

Rank	Team	Record
Gold medal	Senegal	5–0
Silver medal	Kenya	3–2
Bronze medal	Mozambique	3–3
4	Zaire	4–2
5	Ivory Coast	2–2
6	Angola	2–3
7	Mali	1–3
8	South Africa	2–3
9	Congo	0–4

== Awards ==
1993 FIBA Africa Championship for Women winners

Senegal
Seventh title

Most Valuable Player
