= 1968 FIBA Africa Championship for Women =

1968 FIBA Women's AfroBasket
2nd FIBA Women's African Basketball Championship

Tournament details
- Host country: United Arab Republic
- Dates: September 9–15, 1968
- Teams: 5 (from 53 confederations)
- Venue: 1 (in 1 host city)

Final positions
- Champions: United Arab Republic (2nd title)

Official website
- 1968 FIBA Africa Championship for Women

The 1968 FIBA Africa Championship for Women was the 2nd FIBA Africa Championship for Women, played under the rules of FIBA, the world governing body for basketball, and the FIBA Africa thereof. The tournament was hosted by the United Arab Republic from September 9 to 15, 1968.

The United Arab Republic ended the round-robin tournament with a 4–0 unbeaten record to win their second title.

== Participating teams ==
Algeria
Mali
Senegal
Somalia
United Arab Republic

== Schedule ==
P	Team	M	W	L	PF	PA	Diff	Pts.
1	United Arab Republic	4	4	0	272	91	+181	8
2	Senegal	4	3	1	224	99	+125	7
3	Mali	4	2	2	150	157	-7	6
4	Algeria	4	1	3	111	204	-93	5
5	Somalia	4	0	4	48	254	-206	4

September 9, 1968

Boxscore

Algeria	44–15	Somalia
Scoring by half: 13-8, 31-7

Cairo

Boxscore

United Arab Repub.	57–20	Mali
Scoring by half: 32-4, 25-16

Cairo

September 11, 1968

Boxscore

Senegal	52–32	Mali
Scoring by half: 18-19, 34-13

Cairo

Boxscore

United Arab Repub.	91–11	Somalia
Scoring by half: 46-0, 45-11

Cairo

September 12, 1968

Boxscore

United Arab Repub.	77–21	Algeria
Scoring by half: 39-10, 38-11

Cairo

Boxscore

Senegal	77–9	Somalia
Scoring by half: 34-3, 43-6

Cairo

September 13, 1968

Boxscore

Mali	42–13	Somalia
Scoring by half: 21-9, 21-4

Cairo

Boxscore

Senegal	56–11	Algeria
Scoring by half: 24-10, 32-1

Cairo

September 15, 1968

Boxscore

United Arab Repub.	47–39	Senegal
Scoring by half: 17-21, 30-18

Cairo

Boxscore

Mali	56–35	Algeria
Scoring by half: 27-18, 29-17

Cairo

== Final standings ==
Rank	Team	Record
Gold medal	United Arab Republic	4–0
Silver medal	Senegal	3–1
Bronze medal	Mali	2–2
4	Algeria	1–3
5	Somalia	0–4

== Awards ==
1968 FIBA Africa Championship for Women winners

United Arab Republic
Second title

Most Valuable Player
