= 1970 FIBA Africa Championship for Women =

1970 FIBA Women's AfroBasket
3rd FIBA Women's African Basketball Championship

Tournament details
- Host country: Togo
- Dates: March 28–April 4, 1970
- Teams: 7 (from 53 confederations)
- Venue: 1 (in 1 host city)

Final positions
- Champions: Madagascar (1st title)

Official website
- 1970 FIBA Africa Championship for Women

The 1970 FIBA Africa Championship for Women was the 3rd FIBA Africa Championship for Women, played under the rules of FIBA, the world governing body for basketball, and the FIBA Africa thereof. The tournament was hosted by Togo from March 28 to April 4, 1970.

Madagascar defeated the United Arab Republic 44–36 in the final to win their first title and qualify for the 1971 FIBA Women's World Championship.

== Draw ==
| Group A | Group B |
|---|---|
| Congo; Egypt; Guinea; Madagascar | Mali; Senegal; Togo |

== Preliminary round ==
=== Group A ===
| Qualified for the semi-finals |

| Team | Pts. | W | L | PF | PA | Diff |
|---|---|---|---|---|---|---|
| Madagascar | 6 | 3 | 0 | 164 | 88 | +76 |
| Egypt | 5 | 2 | 1 | 140 | 90 | +50 |
| Guinea | 4 | 1 | 2 | 110 | 106 | +4 |
| Congo | 3 | 0 | 3 | 72 | 202 | -130 |

March 28, 1970

Boxscore

| Madagascar | 36–16 | Guinea |
Scoring by half: 19-8, 17-8

Lome

Boxscore

| Congo | 15–55 | Egypt |
Scoring by half: 7-18, 8-37

Lome

March 29, 1970

Boxscore

| Madagascar | 81–27 | Congo |
Scoring by half: 39-11, 42-16

Lome

Boxscore

| Guinea | 28–40 | Egypt |
Scoring by half: 10-19, 18-21

Lome

March 31, 1970

Boxscore

| Guinea | 66–30 | Congo |
Scoring by half: 29-9, 37-21

Lome

Boxscore

| Egypt | 45–47 | Madagascar |
Scoring by half: 13-25, 32-22

Lome

=== Group B ===
| Qualified for the semi-finals |

| Team | Pts. | W | L | PF | PA | Diff |
|---|---|---|---|---|---|---|
| Senegal | 4 | 2 | 0 | 98 | 52 | +46 |
| Mali | 3 | 1 | 1 | 112 | 102 | +100 |
| Togo | 2 | 0 | 2 | 69 | 125 | -56 |

March 28, 1970

Boxscore

| Togo | 51–78 | Mali |
Scoring by half: 25-21, 26-57

Lome

March 29, 1970

Boxscore

| Senegal | 51–34 | Mali |
Scoring by half: 22-13, 29-21

Lome

March 30, 1970

Boxscore

| Senegal | 47–18 | Togo |
Scoring by half: 22-7, 25-11

Lome

== Knockout stage ==
Semi-finals
April 2, 1970
Madagascar | 63
Mali | 54
April 2, 1970
Senegal | 31
Egypt | 47

Final
April 4, 1970
Madagascar | 44
Egypt | 36
Third place
April 4, 1970
Mali | 27
Senegal | 50

=== Semifinals ===
April 2, 1970

Boxscore

| Madagascar | 63–54 | Mali |
Scoring by half: 27-26, 36-28

Lome

Boxscore

| Senegal | 31–47 | Egypt |
Scoring by half: 15-20, 16-27

Lome

=== 5th place match ===
April 3, 1970

Boxscore

| Togo | 35–39 | Guinea |
Scoring by half: 20-25, 15-14

Lome

=== Bronze medal match ===
April 4, 1970

Boxscore

| Mali | 27–50 | Senegal |
Scoring by half: 11-31, 16-19

Lome

=== Final ===
April 4, 1970

Boxscore

| Madagascar | 44–36 | Egypt |
Scoring by half: 16-8, 28-28

Lome

== Final standings ==
| Qualified for the 1971 FIBA Women's World Cup |

| Rank | Team | Record |
|---|---|---|
| Gold medal | Madagascar | 5–0 |
| Silver medal | Egypt | 3–2 |
| Bronze medal | Senegal | 3–1 |
| 4 | Mali | 1–3 |
| 5 | Guinea | 2–2 |
| 6 | Togo | 0–3 |
| 7 | Congo | 0–3 |

== Awards ==
1970 FIBA Africa Championship for Women winners

Madagascar
First title

Most Valuable Player
