= 1979 FIBA Africa Championship for Women =

Feminine basketball competition

1979 FIBA Women's AfroBasket
6th FIBA Women's African Basketball Championship

Tournament details
- Host country: Somalia
- Dates: December 31, 1978 – January 2, 1979
- Teams: 3 (from 53 federations)
- Venue: 1 (in 1 host city)

Final positions
- Champions: Senegal (3rd title)

Official website
- 1979 FIBA Africa Championship for Women

The 1979 FIBA Africa Championship for Women was the 6th FIBA Africa Championship for Women, played under the rules of FIBA, the world governing body for basketball, and the FIBA Africa thereof. The tournament was hosted by Somalia from December 31, 1978 to January 2, 1979.

Senegal ended the round-robin tournament with a 2–0 unbeaten record to win their third title and qualify for the 1979 FIBA Women's World Championship.

== Participating teams ==
Ghana
Senegal
Somalia

== Schedule ==
| P | Team | M | W | L | PF | PA | Diff | Pts. |
|---|---|---|---|---|---|---|---|---|
| 1 | Senegal | 2 | 2 | 0 | 146 | 57 | +89 | 4 |
| 2 | Somalia | 2 | 1 | 1 | 98 | 138 | -40 | 3 |
| 3 | Ghana | 2 | 0 | 2 | 101 | 150 | -49 | 2 |

December 31, 1978

Boxscore

| Senegal | 77–32 | Ghana |
Scoring by half: 32-16, 45-16

Mogadishu

January 1, 1979

Boxscore

| Somalia | 73–69 | Ghana |
Scoring by half: 40-36, 33-33

Mogadishu

January 2, 1979

Boxscore

| Senegal | 69–25 | Somalia |
Scoring by half: 31-11, 38-14

Mogadishu

== Final standings ==
| Qualified for the 1979 FIBA Women's World Cup |

| Rank | Team | Record |
|---|---|---|
| Gold medal | Senegal | 2–0 |
| Silver medal | Somalia | 1–1 |
| Bronze medal | Ghana | 0–2 |

== Awards ==
1979 FIBA Africa Championship for Women winners

Senegal
Third title

Most Valuable Player
