= 1994 FIBA Africa Championship for Women =

Women's basketball tournament

1994 FIBA Women's AfroBasket
13th FIBA Women's African Basketball Championship

Tournament details
- Host country: South Africa
- Dates: 10–17 December 1994
- Teams: 8 (from 53 federations)
- Venue: 1 (in 1 host city)

Final positions
- Champions: Zaire (3rd title)

Official website
- 1994 FIBA Africa Championship for Women

The 1994 FIBA Africa Championship for Women was the 13th FIBA Africa Championship for Women, played under the rules of FIBA, the world governing body for basketball, and the FIBA Africa thereof. The tournament was hosted by South Africa from 10 to 17 December 1994.

Zaire defeated Senegal 68–48 in the final to win their third title and secure a berth at the 1996 Summer Olympics.

== Draw ==
Group A	Group B
Guinea; Ivory Coast; Mozambique; Senegal	Angola; South Africa; Zaire; Zimbabwe

== Preliminary round ==
=== Group A ===
Qualified for the semi-finals

Team	Pts.	W	L	PF	PA	Diff
Senegal	6	3	0	227	117	+110
Mozambique	5	2	1	186	157	+29
Ivory Coast	4	1	2	177	192	-15
Guinea	3	0	3	121	245	-124

10 December 1994

Boxscore

Ivory Coast	81–40	Guinea
Scoring by half: 25-18, 56-22

Johannesburg

Boxscore

Senegal	52–45	Mozambique
Scoring by half: 19-21, 33-24

Johannesburg

12 December 1994

Boxscore

Senegal	84–36	Guinea
Scoring by half: 42-13, 42-23

Johannesburg

14 December 1994

Boxscore

Mozambique	61–60	Ivory Coast
Scoring by half: 31-22, 30-38

Johannesburg

12 December 1994

Boxscore

Mozambique	80–45	Guinea
Scoring by half: 35-21, 45-24

Johannesburg

14 December 1994

Boxscore

Senegal	91–36	Ivory Coast
Scoring by half: 42-16, 49-20

Johannesburg

=== Group B ===
Qualified for the semi-finals

Team	Pts.	W	L	PF	PA	Diff
Zaire	6	3	0	280	124	+156
Angola	5	2	1	205	144	+61
South Africa	4	1	2	151	228	-77
Zimbabwe	3	0	3	124	264	-140

10 December 1994

Boxscore

South Africa	67–46	Zimbabwe
Scoring by half: 29-22, 38-24

Johannesburg

13 December 1994

Boxscore

Zaire	60–46	Angola
Scoring by half: 20-19, 40-27

Johannesburg

11 December 1994

Boxscore

Angola	78–47	South Africa
Scoring by half: 40-22, 38-25

Johannesburg

11 December 1994

Boxscore

Zaire	116–41	Zimbabwe
Scoring by half: 55-23, 61-18

Johannesburg

Boxscore

Angola	81–37	Zimbabwe
Scoring by half: 45-19, 36-18

Johannesburg

10 December 1994

Boxscore

Zaire	104–37	South Africa
Scoring by half: 56-24, 48-13

Johannesburg

== Knockout stage ==
Semi-finals
15 December 1994
Senegal	63
Angola	52
15 December 1994
Zaire	62
Mozambique	52

Final
17 December 1994
Zaire	68
Senegal	48
Third place
17 December 1994
Angola	53
Mozambique	29

=== Semifinals ===
15 December 1994

Boxscore

Senegal	63–52	Angola
Scoring by half: 30-26, 33-26

Johannesburg

[ Boxscore]

Zaire	62–52	Mozambique
Scoring by half: 29-24, 33-28

Johannesburg

=== 7th place match ===
16 December 1994

Boxscore

Zimbabwe	54–42	Guinea
Scoring by half: 20-30, 34-12

Johannesburg

=== 5th place match ===
16 December 1994

Boxscore

Ivory Coast	63–60	South Africa
Scoring by half: 30-34, 33-26

Johannesburg

=== Bronze medal match ===
17 December 1994

Boxscore

Angola	53–29	Mozambique
Scoring by half: 24-13, 29-16

Johannesburg

=== Final ===
17 December 1994

Boxscore

Zaire	68–48	Senegal
Scoring by half: 27-25, 41-23

Johannesburg

== Final standings ==
Qualified for the 1996 Summer Olympics

Rank	Team	Record
Gold medal	Zaire	5–0
Silver medal	Senegal	4–1
Bronze medal	Angola	3–2
4	Mozambique	2–3
5	Ivory Coast	2–2
6	South Africa	1–3
7	Zimbabwe	1–3
8	Guinea	0–4

== Awards ==
1994 FIBA Africa Championship for Women winners

Zaire
Third title

Most Valuable Player
