= 2003 FIBA Africa Championship for Women =

2003 FIBA Women's AfroBasket
16th FIBA Women's African Basketball Championship

Tournament details
- Host country: Mozambique
- Dates: December 18–28
- Teams: 10 (from 53 federations)
- Venues: 2 (in 2 host cities)

Final positions
- Champions: Nigeria (1st title)

Tournament statistics
- MVP: (Mozambique) Deolinda Ngulela

Official website
- 2003 FIBA Africa Championship for Women

The 2003 FIBA Africa Championship for Women was the 16th FIBA Africa Championship for Women, played under the rules of FIBA, the world governing body for basketball, and the FIBA Africa thereof. The tournament was hosted by Mozambique from December 18 to 28, with the games played at the Pavilhão do Maxaquene in Maputo and in Nampula.

Nigeria defeated Mozambique 69–63 in the final to win their first title. and securing a spot at the 2004 Summer Olympics.

== Draw ==
Group A	Group B
Angola; Cameroon; Mozambique; South Africa; Tunisia	Algeria; DR Congo; Mali; Nigeria; Senegal

== Preliminary round ==
Times given below are in UTC+2.

=== Group A ===
Qualified for the semi-finals

Team	Pts.	W	L	PF	PA	Diff
Angola	8	4	0	279	195	+84
Mozambique	7	3	1	298	222	+76
Tunisia	6	2	2	251	244	+7
Cameroon	5	1	3	216	251	-35
South Africa	4	0	4	163	295	-132

18 December 2003

Tunisia	54–56	Angola

Pavilhão do Maxaquene, Maputo

Mozambique	69–51	South Africa

Pavilhão do Maxaquene, Maputo

20 December 2003

South Africa	44–67	Cameroon

Pavilhão do Maxaquene, Maputo

Angola	73–66	Mozambique

Pavilhão do Maxaquene, Maputo

21 December 2003

Mozambique	70–47	Cameroon

Pavilhão do Maxaquene, Maputo

South Africa	37–86	Tunisia

Pavilhão do Maxaquene, Maputo

22 December 2003

Angola	73–31	South Africa

Pavilhão do Maxaquene, Maputo

Cameroon	58–60	Tunisia

Pavilhão do Maxaquene, Maputo

23 December 2003

Cameroon	44–77	Angola

Pavilhão do Maxaquene, Maputo

Mozambique	93–51	Tunisia

Pavilhão do Maxaquene, Maputo

=== Group B ===
Qualified for the semi-finals

Team	Pts.	W	L	PF	PA	Diff
Senegal	7	3	1	283	208	+75
Nigeria	7	3	1	253	204	+49
Mali	7	3	1	255	254	+1
DR Congo	5	1	3	235	266	-31
Algeria	4	0	4	188	282	-94

19 December 2003

Senegal	55–63	Nigeria

Pavilhão do Ferroviário, Nampula

DR Congo	66–79	Mali

Pavilhão do Ferroviário, Nampula

20 December 2003

Mali	57–85	Senegal

Pavilhão do Ferroviário, Nampula

DR Congo	66–49	Algeria

Pavilhão do Ferroviário, Nampula

21 December 2003

Mali	67–57	Algeria

Pavilhão do Ferroviário, Nampula

Nigeria	69–55	DR Congo

Pavilhão do Ferroviário, Nampula

22 December 2003

Algeria	40–74	Senegal

Pavilhão do Ferroviário, Nampula

Mali	52–46	Nigeria

Pavilhão do Ferroviário, Nampula

24 December 2003

Senegal	69–48	DR Congo

Pavilhão do Ferroviário, Nampula

Algeria	42–75	Nigeria

Pavilhão do Ferroviário, Nampula

== Knockout stage ==
=== 9th place match ===
27 December 2003

South Africa	57–48	Algeria

Pavilhão do Maxaquene, Maputo

=== 7th place match ===
27 December 2003

Cameroon	64–72	DR Congo

Pavilhão do Maxaquene, Maputo

=== 5th place match ===
27 December 2003

Tunisia	65–71	Mali

Pavilhão do Maxaquene, Maputo

=== Semifinals bracket ===
Semi-finals
December 26
Nigeria	64
Angola	61
December 26
Mozambique	63
Senegal	62

Final
December 28
Nigeria	69
Mozambique	63
Third place
December 28
Angola	47
Senegal	61

=== Semifinals ===
26 December 2003

Angola	61–64	Nigeria

Pavilhão do Maxaquene, Maputo

26 December 2003

Senegal	62–63	Mozambique

Pavilhão do Maxaquene, Maputo

=== Bronze medal match ===
28 December 2003

Angola	47–61	Senegal

Pavilhão do Maxaquene, Maputo

=== Final ===
28 December 2003

Nigeria	69–63	Mozambique
Pts: Udoka 28		Pts: Clarisse 21

Pavilhão do Maxaquene, Maputo

== Final standings ==
Qualified for the 2004 Summer Olympics

Rank	Team	Record
1st place, gold medalist(s)	Nigeria	5–1
2nd place, silver medalist(s)	Mozambique	4–2
3rd place, bronze medalist(s)	Senegal	4–2
4	Angola	4–2
5	Mali	4–1
6	Tunisia	2–3
7	DR Congo	2–3
8	Cameroon	1–4
9	South Africa	1–4
10	Algeria	0–5

Nigeria roster
Aisha Mohammed, Funmilayo Ojelabi, Linda Ogugua, Mfon Udoka, Mactabene Amachree, Nguveren Iyorhe, Nwamaka Adibeli, Patricia Chukwuma, Rashidat Sadiq, Coach: Sam Vincent

== Awards ==
2003 FIBA Africa Championship for Women winners

Nigeria
First title

Most Valuable Player
(Mozambique) Deolinda Ngulela

== See also ==
- 2003 FIBA Africa Women's Clubs Champions Cup
