= 1984 FIBA Africa Championship for Women =

1984 FIBA Women's AfroBasket
9th FIBA Women's African Basketball Championship

Tournament details
- Host country: Senegal
- Dates: December 22–30, 1984
- Teams: 8 (from 53 federations)
- Venue: 1 (in 1 host city)

Final positions
- Champions: Senegal (5th title)

Official website
- 1984 FIBA Africa Championship for Women

The 1984 FIBA Africa Championship for Women was the 9th FIBA Africa Championship for Women, played under the rules of FIBA, the world governing body for basketball, and the FIBA Africa thereof. The tournament was hosted by Senegal from December 22 to 30, 1984.

Senegal defeated Zaire 2–0 in a walkover win.

== Draw ==
Group A	Group B
Cameroon; Egypt; Guinea; Senegal	Angola; Mali; Mozambique; Zaire

== Preliminary round ==
=== Group A ===
Qualified for the semi-finals

Team	Pts.	W	L	PF	PA	Diff
Senegal	6	3	0	269	146	+123
Cameroon	5	2	1	188	142	+46
Egypt	4	1	2	183	220	-37
Guinea	3	0	3	128	260	-132

December 22, 1984

Boxscore

Senegal	97–38	Guinea
Scoring by half: 49-18, 48-20

Dakar

December 23, 1984

Boxscore

Cameroon	61–39	Egypt
Scoring by half: 29-25, 32-14

Dakar

December 24, 1984

Boxscore

Senegal	100–60	Egypt
Scoring by half: 45-29, 55-31

Dakar

December 25, 1984

Boxscore

Cameroon	79–31	Guinea
Scoring by half: 44-9, 35-22

Dakar

December 26, 1984

Boxscore

Egypt	84–59	Guinea
Scoring by half: 32-28, 52-31

Dakar

December 27, 1984

Boxscore

Senegal	72–48	Cameroon
Scoring by half: 30-25, 42-23

Dakar

=== Group B ===
Qualified for the semi-finals

Team	Pts.	W	L	PF	PA	Diff
Zaire	6	3	0	274	164	+110
Mali	5	2	1	206	210	-4
Mozambique	4	1	2	218	252	-34
Angola	3	0	3	139	211	-72

December 22, 1984

Boxscore

Zaire	111–83	Mozambique
Scoring by half: 51-37, 60-46

Dakar

December 23, 1984

Boxscore

Mali	66–57	Angola
Scoring by half: 24-29, 42-28

Dakar

December 24, 1984

Boxscore

Mozambique	53–49	Angola
Scoring by half: 28-21, 25-28

Dakar

December 25, 1984

Boxscore

Zaire	71–48	Mali
Scoring by half: 33-18, 38-30

Dakar

December 26, 1984

Boxscore

Zaire	92–33	Angola
Scoring by half: 44-19, 48-14

Dakar

December 27, 1984

Boxscore

Mali	92–82	Mozambique
Scoring by half: 44-45, 48-37

Dakar

== Knockout stage ==
Semi-finals
December 28, 1984
Senegal	93
Mali	81
December 28, 1984
Zaire	116
Cameroon	86

Final
December 30, 1984
Senegal	2
Zaire	0
Third place
December 30, 1984
Cameroon	83
Mali	70

=== Semifinals ===
December 28, 1984

Boxscore

Senegal	93–81	Mali
Scoring by half: 45-44, 48-37

Dakar

December 28, 1984

Boxscore

Zaire	116–86	Cameroon
Scoring by half: 54-45, 62-41

Dakar

=== 7th place match ===
December 29, 1984

Boxscore

Angola	116–44	Guinea
Scoring by half: 71-23, 45-21

Dakar

=== 5th place match ===
December 29, 1984

Boxscore

Mozambique	93–51	Egypt
Scoring by half: 57-27, 36-24

Dakar

=== Bronze medal match ===
December 30, 1984

Boxscore

Cameroon	83–70	Mali
Scoring by half: 50-26, 33-44

Dakar

=== Final ===
December 30, 1984

Senegal	2–0	Zaire

Dakar

== Final standings ==
Rank	Team	Record
Gold medal	Senegal	5–0
Silver medal	Zaire	4–1
Bronze medal	Cameroon	3–2
4	Mali	2–3
5	Mozambique	2–2
6	Egypt	1–3
7	Angola	1–3
8	Guinea	0–4

== Awards ==
1984 FIBA Africa Championship for Women winners

Senegal
Fifth title

Most Valuable Player
