= Guinea women's national basketball team =

Guinea
- FIBA ranking: 96 ▼1 (14 September 2026)
- Joined FIBA: 1962
- FIBA zone: FIBA Africa
- National federation: Fédération Guinéenne de Basket-Ball
- Coach: Malick Kone

AfroBasket
- Appearances: 11
- Medals: (silver) (1966)

Guinea women's national basketball team is the nationally basketball team representing Guinea at world basketball competitions for women.

== African Championship record ==
- 1966 – 2nd
- 1970 – 5th
- 1974 – 7th
- 1984 – 8th
- 1994 – 8th
- 2011 – 11th
- 2015 – 9th
- 2017 – 10th
- 2021 – 12th
- 2023 – 8th
- 2025 – 12th

== Current roster ==
Roster for the 2025 Women's Afrobasket.

Guinea men's national basketball team roster
Players
Coaches

Pos.	No.	Name	Age – Date of birth	Height	Club	Ctr.
SG	1	Fatoumata Jallow	28 – 16 April 1997	1.70 m (5 ft 7 in)	Alviks BK	(Sweden)
SG	2	Nana Souman	19 – 11 September 2005	1.75 m (5 ft 9 in)	Centre Fédéral	(Guinea)
G	4	Catherine Keita	22 – 13 June 2003	1.74 m (5 ft 9 in)	Free agent
PF	5	Masseny Kaba	26 – 15 December 1998	1.91 m (6 ft 3 in)	UF Angers	(France)
SG	7	Aicha Mara	29 – 24 January 1996	1.80 m (5 ft 11 in)	AS Monaco	(France)
F	8	Fatima Sacko	27 – 19 April 1998	1.75 m (5 ft 9 in)
F	10	Salematou Sylla	22 – 16 February 2003	1.80 m (5 ft 11 in)
PF	11	Batouly Camara	28 – 2 November 1996	1.88 m (6 ft 2 in)	CP Bembibre	(Spain)
C	14	Nafisatou Diack	20 – 11 November 2004	1.80 m (5 ft 11 in)	Centre Fédéral	(Guinea)
C	22	Fanta Sidibe	19 – 2 April 2006	1.75 m (5 ft 9 in)	Panthers BC	(Guinea)
C	23	Saran Tohonamou	18 – 2 January 2007	1.90 m (6 ft 3 in)	Seed Academy	(Senegal)

Head coach

- (Guinea) Malick Kone

Assistant coach(es)

- (Guinea) Ibrahima Touré
- (France) Rany Rubio

Legend

- Club – describes last
  club before the tournament
- Age – describes age
  on 26 July 2025
