= Mame Maty Mbengue =

Senegalese basketball player (born 1968)

Personal information
- Born: 13 April 1968 (age 58) Dakar, Senegal
- Listed height: 187 cm (6 ft 2 in)
- Listed weight: 82 kg (181 lb)
- Position: Center

Career highlights
- 4× FIBA AfroBasket Women MVP (1993, 1997, 1999, 2000)

Mame Maty Mbengue (born 13 April 1968 in Dakar) is a Senegalese women's basketball player. She competed at the 2000 Summer Olympics with the Senegal women's national basketball team, where she scored 35 points over 6 games.
