= 1986 FIBA Africa Championship for Women =

1986 FIBA Women's AfroBasket
10th FIBA Women's African Basketball Championship

Tournament details
- Host country: Mozambique
- Dates: December 17–27, 1986
- Teams: 5 (from 53 federations)
- Venue: 1 (in 1 host city)

Final positions
- Champions: Zaire (2nd title)

Official website
- 1986 FIBA Africa Championship for Women

The 1986 FIBA Africa Championship for Women was the 10th FIBA Africa Championship for Women, played under the rules of FIBA, the world governing body for basketball, and the FIBA Africa thereof. The tournament was hosted by Mozambique from December 17 to 27, 1986.

Zaire ended the round-robin tournament with a 4–0 unbeaten record to win their second title.

== Participating teams ==
Angola
Cameroon
Kenya
Mozambique
Zaire

== Schedule ==
P	Team	M	W	L	PF	PA	Diff	Pts.
1	Zaire	4	4	0	381	231	+150	8
2	Mozambique	4	3	1	297	252	+45	7
3	Angola	4	2	2	307	246	+61	6
4	Cameroon	4	1	3	294	347	-53	5
5	Kenya	4	0	4	228	431	-203	4

December 17, 1986

Boxscore

Mozambique	79–70	Cameroon
Scoring by half: 39-33, 40-37

Maputo

December 18, 1986

Boxscore

Zaire	76–68	Angola
Scoring by half: 39-30, 37-38

Maputo

December 19, 1986

Boxscore

Mozambique	98–67	Kenya
Scoring by half: 53-32, 45-35

Maputo

December 20, 1986

Boxscore

Angola	112–68	Cameroon
Scoring by half: 62-37, 50-31

Maputo

December 21, 1986

Boxscore

Zaire	150–46	Kenya
Scoring by half: 65-18, 85-28

Maputo

December 22, 1986

Boxscore

Mozambique	56–47	Angola
Scoring by half: 29-34, 27-13

Maputo

December 23, 1986

Boxscore

Angola	80–46	Kenya
Scoring by half: 37-23, 43-23

Maputo

December 24, 1986

Boxscore

Zaire	87–53	Cameroon
Scoring by half: 35-24, 52-29

Maputo

December 26, 1986

Boxscore

Cameroon	103–69	Kenya
Scoring by half: 51-24, 52-45

Maputo

December 27, 1986

Boxscore

Zaire	68–64	Mozambique
Scoring by half: 35-21, 33-43

Maputo

== Final standings ==
Rank	Team	Record
Gold medal	Zaire	4–0
Silver medal	Mozambique	3–1
Bronze medal	Angola	2–2
4	Cameroon	1–3
5	Kenya	0–4

== Awards ==
1986 FIBA Africa Championship for Women winners

Zaire
Second title

Most Valuable Player
