= Tanzania women's national basketball team =

Tanzania
- FIBA ranking: NR (14 September 2026)
- Joined FIBA: 1968
- FIBA zone: FIBA Africa
- National federation: Tanzania Basketball Federation (TBF)

AfroBasket
- Appearances: 1
Home	Away

The Tanzania women's national basketball team represents Tanzania in international competitions. It is administered by the Tanzania Basketball Federation (TBF).

== AfroBasket record ==
- 1997 – 8th place
