= Republic of the Congo women's national basketball team =

Republic of the Congo
- FIBA ranking: NR (18 March 2026)
- Joined FIBA: 1962
- FIBA zone: FIBA Africa

AfroBasket
- Appearances: 2
Home	Away

The Congo women's national basketball team is the women's national basketball team of the Republic of the Congo. It is administered by the Fédération Congolaise de Basketball.

== AfroBasket record ==
- 1970 – 7th place
- 1993 – 9th place

== See also ==
- Republic of the Congo women's national under-19 basketball team
- Republic of the Congo women's national under-17 basketball team
- Republic of the Congo women's national 3x3 team
