= 1997 FIBA Africa Championship for Women =

1997 FIBA Women's AfroBasket
14th FIBA Women's African Basketball Championship

Tournament details
- Host country: Kenya
- Dates: December 12–20
- Teams: 9 (from 53 federations)
- Venue: 1 (in 1 host city)

Final positions
- Champions: Senegal (8th title)

Tournament statistics
- MVP: (Senegal) Mame Maty Mbengue

Official website
- 1997 FIBA Africa Championship for Women

The 1997 FIBA Africa Championship for Women was the 14th FIBA Africa Championship for Women, played under the rules of FIBA, the world governing body for basketball, and the FIBA Africa thereof. The tournament was hosted by Kenya from December 12 to 20, 1997.

Senegal defeated DR Congo 73–59 in the final to win their eighth title with both winner and runner-up qualifying for the 1998 FIBA Women's World Cup and the 2000 Summer Olympics.

== Draw ==
| Group A | Group B |
|---|---|
| Cameroon; Kenya; Mali; Senegal; Uganda | Angola; DR Congo; Nigeria; Tanzania |

== Preliminary round ==
=== Group A ===
| Qualified for the semi-finals |

| Team | Pts. | W | L | PF | PA | Diff |
|---|---|---|---|---|---|---|
| Senegal | 8 | 4 | 0 | 441 | 211 | +230 |
| Kenya | 7 | 3 | 1 | 334 | 283 | +51 |
| Mali | 6 | 2 | 2 | 335 | 231 | +104 |
| Cameroon | 5 | 1 | 3 | 169 | 529 | -360 |
| Uganda | 4 | 0 | 4 | 155 | 593 | -438 |

December 12

Boxscore

| Kenya | 117–36 | Uganda |
Scoring by half: 65-13, 52-23

Nairobi

Boxscore

| Senegal | 68–50 | Mali |
Scoring by half: 37-21, 31-29

Nairobi

December 13

Boxscore

| Uganda | 31–140 | Mali |
Scoring by half: 12-75, 19-65

Nairobi

Boxscore

| Cameroon | 68–81 | Kenya |
Scoring by half: 32-45, 36-36

Nairobi

December 14

Boxscore

| Senegal | 118–56 | Cameroon |
Scoring by half: 60-25, 58-31

Nairobi

Boxscore

| Mali | 74–76 | Kenya |
Scoring by half: 41-35, 33-41

Nairobi

December 15

Boxscore

| Uganda | 45–150 | Senegal |
Scoring by half: 12-67, 33-83

Nairobi

Boxscore

| Mali | 71–56 | Cameroon |
Scoring by half: 34-33, 37-23

Nairobi

December 16

Boxscore

| Uganda | 57–122 | Cameroon |
Scoring by half: 29-67, 28-55

Nairobi

Boxscore

| Senegal | 105–60 | Kenya |
Scoring by half: 50-33, 55-27

Nairobi

=== Group B ===
| Qualified for the semi-finals |

| Team | Pts. | W | L | PF | PA | Diff |
|---|---|---|---|---|---|---|
| DR Congo | 6 | 3 | 0 | 288 | 164 | +124 |
| Nigeria | 5 | 2 | 1 | 252 | 174 | +78 |
| Angola | 3 | 1 | 2 | 251 | 195 | +56 |
| Tanzania | 3 | 0 | 3 | 126 | 384 | -258 |

December 12

Boxscore

| Nigeria | 115–29 | Tanzania |
Scoring by half: 52-18, 63-11

Nairobi

Boxscore

| DR Congo | 69–56 | Angola |
Scoring by half: 16-18, 53-38

Nairobi

December 13

Boxscore

| Tanzania | 46–118 | Angola |
Scoring by half: 25-55, 21-63

Nairobi

Boxscore

| DR Congo | 68–57 | Nigeria |
Scoring by half: 30-28, 38-29

Nairobi

December 15

Boxscore

| Nigeria | 80–77 | Angola |
Scoring by half: 42-37, 38-40

Nairobi

Boxscore

| DR Congo | 151–51 | Tanzania |
Scoring by half: 55-23, 96-28

Nairobi

== Knockout stage ==
Semi-finals
December 18
Senegal | 74
Nigeria | 56
December 18
DR Congo | 94
Kenya | 68

Final
December 20
Senegal | 73
DR Congo | 59
Third place
December 20
Kenya | 62
Nigeria | 90

=== Semifinals ===
December 18

Boxscore

| Senegal | 74–56 | Nigeria |
Scoring by half: 39-24, 35-32

Nairobi

December 18

Boxscore

| DR Congo | 94–68 | Kenya |
Scoring by half: 51-42, 43-26

Nairobi

=== 7th place match ===
December 19

Boxscore

| Cameroon | 90–56 | Tanzania |
Scoring by half: 49-26, 41-30

Nairobi

=== 5th place match ===
December 19

Boxscore

| Angola | 65–57 | Mali |
Scoring by half: 24-32, 41-25

Nairobi

=== Bronze medal match ===
December 20

Boxscore

| Kenya | 62–90 | Nigeria |
Scoring by half: 32-49, 30-41

Nairobi

=== Final ===
December 20

Boxscore

| Senegal | 73–59 | DR Congo |
Scoring by half: 38-33, 35-26

Nairobi

== Final standings ==
| Qualified for the 2000 Summer Olympics |
| Qualified for the 1998 FIBA Women's World Cup |

| Rank | Team | Record |
|---|---|---|
| 1st place, gold medalist(s) | Senegal | 6–0 |
| 2nd place, silver medalist(s) | DR Congo | 5–1 |
| 3rd place, bronze medalist(s) | Nigeria | 4–2 |
| 4 | Kenya | 3–3 |
| 5 | Angola | 3–2 |
| 6 | Mali | 2–3 |
| 7 | Cameroon | 2–3 |
| 8 | Tanzania | 1–4 |
| 9 | Uganda | 1–4 |

== Awards ==
1997 FIBA Africa Championship for Women winners

Senegal
Eighth title

Most Valuable Player
(Senegal) Mame Maty Mbengue
