= Fatou N'Diaye (basketball) =

French-Senegalese basketball player

Personal information
- Citizenship: French-Senegalese
- Born: June 23, 1962 (age 63) Dakar, Senegal
- Years active: 1986–1990

Sport
- Sport: Basketball
- Team: France women's national basketball team

Fatou N'Diaye (born 23 June 1962 in Dakar, Senegal) is a French-Senegalese basketball player. N'Diaye had 75 selections on the France women's national basketball team from 1986 to 1990.
