= Algeria women's national basketball team =

Algeria
- FIBA ranking: NR (18 March 2026)
- Joined FIBA: 1963
- FIBA zone: FIBA Africa
- National federation: Fédération Algérienne de Basket-Ball
- Coach: Azzedine Labouize

AfroBasket
- Appearances: 8
Home	Away

Algeria women's national basketball team is the nationally controlled basketball team representing Algeria at world basketball competitions for women.

== Results ==
=== African Championship ===
- 1968 – 4th
- 1974 – 9th
- 1977 – 8th
- 1981 – 8th
- 1990 – 8th
- 2003 – 10th
- 2013 – 11th
- 2015 – 11th

=== African Games ===
- 2007 – 6th

=== Mediterranean Games ===
- 2022 – 10th
