= South Africa women's national basketball team =

South Africa
- FIBA ranking: NR (9 February 2025)
- Joined FIBA: 1992
- FIBA zone: FIBA Africa
- National federation: BSA
- Coach: Kimathi Toboti

AfroBasket
- Appearances: 5
Home	Away

South Africa women's national basketball team is the national basketball team representing South Africa at world basketball competitions for women. The team is administered by Basketball South Africa.

== African Championship record ==
- 1993 – 8th
- 1994 – 6th
- 2003 – 9th
- 2009 – 11th
- 2015 – 12th

== See also ==
- South Africa women's national under-19 basketball team
- South Africa women's national under-17 basketball team
