= AfroBasket Women =

Women's basketball continental championship of Africa

- Most recent season or competition: 2027 FIBA Women's AfroBasket
- Sport: Basketball
- Founded: 1966; 60 years ago
- No. of teams: 12
- Country: FIBA Africa member nations
- Continent: FIBA Africa (Africa)
- Most recent champion: Nigeria (7th title)
- Most titles: Senegal (11 titles)
- Website: www.fiba.basketball/history

The AfroBasket Women (alternatively known as the FIBA Africa Championship for Women, FIBA Women's African Championship, or FIBA Women's AfroBasket) is the women's basketball continental championship of Africa, played biennially under the auspices of FIBA, the world governing body for basketball, and the African zone thereof.

The tournament also serves as the first round of qualifiers for the quadrennial FIBA Women's World Cup and Olympic Games. As for the World Cup, the top two teams from Women's AfroBasket qualify for the World Cup Final Qualifying Tournament. As for the Olympic Games, the Women's AfroBasket champions qualify directly for the Olympics; the teams placed 2nd–4th qualify for the Olympic Qualifying Tournaments.

== Results ==
=== Summaries ===
Year	Hosts	Final			Third place match		
Year	Hosts	Champions	Score	Runners-up	Third place	Score	Fourth place
1966; Details	Guinea	United Arab Republic	^{n/a}	Guinea	Central African Republic	^{n/a}	Senegal
1968; Details	UAR	United Arab Republic	^{n/a}	Senegal	Mali	^{n/a}	Algeria
1970; Details	Togo	Madagascar	44–36	United Arab Republic	Senegal	50–27	Mali
1974; Details	Tunisia	Senegal	47–44	Tunisia	Egypt	56–34	Togo
1977; Details	Senegal	Senegal	88–56	Egypt	Togo	70–35	Ivory Coast
1979; Details	Somalia	Senegal	^{n/a}	Somalia	Ghana	^{n/a}	
1981; Details	Senegal	Senegal	83–73	Zaire	Angola	83–71	Mali
1983; Details	Angola	Zaire	^{n/a}	Senegal	Cameroon	^{n/a}	Mozambique
1984; Details	Senegal	Senegal	2–0^{w/o}	Zaire	Cameroon	83–70	Mali
1986; Details	Mozambique	Zaire	^{n/a}	Mozambique	Angola	^{n/a}	Cameroon
1990; Details	Tunisia	Senegal	70–68	Zaire	Mozambique	86–75	Tunisia
1993; Details	Senegal	Senegal	89–43	Kenya	Mozambique	63–57	Zaire
1994; Details	South Africa	Zaire	68–48	Senegal	Angola	53–29	Mozambique
1997; Details	Kenya	Senegal	73–59	DR Congo	Nigeria	90–62	Kenya
2000; Details	Tunisia	Senegal	71–63	Tunisia	DR Congo	80–79	Morocco
2003; Details	Mozambique	Nigeria	69–63	Mozambique	Senegal	61–47	Angola
2005; Details	Nigeria	Nigeria	64–57	Senegal	Mozambique	59–51	DR Congo
2007; Details	Senegal	Mali	63–56	Senegal	Angola	73–58	Mozambique
2009; Details	Madagascar	Senegal	72–57	Mali	Angola	76–57	Ivory Coast
2011; Details	Mali	Angola	62–54	Senegal	Mali	71–62	Nigeria
2013; Details	Mozambique	Angola	64–61 (OT)	Mozambique	Senegal	56–53	Cameroon
2015; Details	Cameroon	Senegal	81–66	Cameroon	Nigeria	65–55	Angola
2017; Details	Mali	Nigeria	65–48	Senegal	Mali	75–52	Mozambique
2019; Details	Senegal	Nigeria	60–55	Senegal	Mali	66–54	Mozambique
2021; Details	Cameroon	Nigeria	70–59	Mali	Cameroon	53–49	Senegal
2023; Details	Rwanda	Nigeria	84–74	Senegal	Mali	89–51	Rwanda
2025; Details	Ivory Coast	Nigeria	78–64	Mali	South Sudan	66–65	Senegal
2027; Details	TBD		–			–	

^n/a A round-robin tournament determined the final standings.
^w/o Withdrew.

=== Medal table ===
Rank	Nation	Gold	Silver	Bronze	Total
1	Senegal	11	9	3	23
2	Nigeria	7	0	2	9
3	DR Congo	3	4	1	8
4	Egypt	2	2	1	5
5	Angola	2	0	5	7
6	Mali	1	3	5	9
7	Madagascar	1	0	0	1
8	Mozambique	0	3	3	6
9	Tunisia	0	2	0	2
10	Cameroon	0	1	3	4
11	Guinea	0	1	0	1
11	Kenya	0	1	0	1
11	Somalia	0	1	0	1
14	Central African Republic	0	0	1	1
14	Ghana	0	0	1	1
14	South Sudan	0	0	1	1
14	Togo	0	0	1	1
Totals (17 entries)		27	27	27	81

== Tournament awards ==
Most recent award winners (2025)

Year	Winner
2025	(Nigeria) Amy Okonkwo

Year	Player	Position	Team
2025	Cierra Dillard	Guard	Senegal
2025	Delicia Washington	Guard	South Sudan
2025	Amy Okonkwo	Forward	Nigeria
2025	Jane Asinde	Forward	Uganda
2025	Sika Koné	Forward	Mali

== Participating nations ==
Nation	(Guinea) 1966	(United Arab Republic) 1968	(Togo) 1970	(Tunisia) 1974	(Senegal) 1977	(Somalia) 1979	(Senegal) 1981	(Angola) 1983	(Senegal) 1984	(Mozambique) 1986	(Tunisia) 1990	(Senegal) 1993	(South Africa) 1994	(Kenya) 1997	(Tunisia) 2000	(Mozambique) 2003	(Nigeria) 2005	(Senegal) 2007	(Madagascar) 2009	(Mali) 2011	(Mozambique) 2013	(Cameroon) 2015	(Mali) 2017	(Senegal) 2019	(Cameroon) 2021	(Rwanda) 2023	(Ivory Coast) 2025	2027	Years
Algeria		4		9	8		8				8					10					11	11							8
Angola							1981	6	7	1986	5	6	1994	5	5	4	6	2007	2009	2011	2013	4	6	5	8	9	10		21
Cameroon								1983	1984	4				7		8		6	7	6	4	2015	8	10	2021	6	5		15
Cape Verde																	7	9			9			9	10				5
Central African Republic	1966			6	9																		12						4
Congo			7									9																	2
DR Congo							1981	1983	1984	1986	1990	4	1994	1997	2001	7	4	7		7			9	6		12			16
Egypt	1966	1968	1970	1974	1977				6		7				7						8	8	7	7	6	10	9		15
Gabon																	9					7							2
Ghana					6	1979														12									3
Guinea	1966		5	7					8				8							11		9	10		12	8	12		11
Ivory Coast					4		5	5			6	5	5		8			8	4	8	7		5	8	7	11	7		16
Kenya										5		1993		4				12			10			11	9				7
Madagascar			1970															10	8										3
Mali		1968	4	8	7		4		4			7		6	9	5	5	2007	2009	2011	5	5	2017	2019	2021	2023	2025	Q	22
Mauritius																			12										1
Morocco															4														1
Mozambique								4	5	1986	1990	1993	4		6	2003	2005	4	6	5	2013	6	4	4	5	5	6		19
Niger															10		8												2
Nigeria				5			7							1997		2003	2005	5	5	4	6	2015	2017	2019	2021	2023	2025	Q	16
Rwanda																			9	9						4	11		4
Senegal	4	1968	1970	1974	1977	1979	1981	1983	1984		1990	1993	1994	1997	2001	2003	2005	2007	2009	2011	2013	2015	2017	2019	4	2023	4	Q	27
Somalia		5				1979																							2
South Africa												8	6			9			11			12							5
South Sudan																											2025	Q	2
Tanzania														8															1
Togo			6	4	1977												10												4
Tunisia				1974	5		6				4				2001	6		11	10	10			11	12	11				12
Uganda														9								10				7	8		4
Zimbabwe													7								12								2
Teams	4	5	7	9	9	3	8	6	8	5	8	9	8	9	10	10	10	12	12	12	12	12	12	12	12	12	12	12	

== Debut of teams ==
A total of 30 national teams have appeared in at least one FIBA Women's AfroBasket in the history of the tournament through the 2025 competition. Each successive AfroBasket has had at least one team appearing for the first time. Countries competing in their first AfroBasket are listed below by year.

Year	Debutants	Number
1966	Central African Republic, Egypt, Guinea, Senegal	4
1968	Algeria, Mali, Somalia	7
1970	Congo, Madagascar, Togo	10
1974	Nigeria, Tunisia	12
1977	Ghana, Ivory Coast	14
1979	None	14
1981	Angola, DR Congo	16
1983	Cameroon, Mozambique	18
1984	None	18
1986	Kenya	19
1990	None	19
1993	South Africa	20
1994	Zimbabwe	21
1997	Tanzania, Uganda	23
2000	Morocco, Niger	25
2003	None	25
2005	Cape Verde, Gabon	27
2007	None	27
2009	Mauritius, Rwanda	29
2011	None	29
2013	None	29
2015	None	29
2017	None	29
2019	None	29
2021	None	29
2023	None	29
2025	South Sudan	30
2027	TBD	30
Total		30

== See also ==
- FIBA Africa Women's Clubs Champions Cup
- FIBA U18 Women's AfroBasket
- FIBA U16 Women's AfroBasket
