= DR Congo women's national basketball team =

Democratic Republic of the Congo
- FIBA ranking: 83 ▼3 (18 March 2026)
- Joined FIBA: 1963
- FIBA zone: FIBA Africa
- National federation: Febaco
- Coach: Bellarmin Tshibangu
- Nickname: Leopards

Olympic Games
- Appearances: 1

World Cup
- Appearances: 3

AfroBasket
- Appearances: 16
- Medals: (1983, 1986, 1994) (1981, 1984, 1990, 1997) (2000)
Home	Away

The DR Congo women's national basketball team (French: Équipe nationale féminine de basket-ball de la République démocratique du Congo) represents the Democratic Republic of the Congo in international basketball competitions. It is controlled by the Basketball Federation of Democratic Republic of Congo. (French: République démocratique du Congo Fédération de basket-ball)

The team was formerly known as the Zaire women's national basketball team (French: Équipe nationale féminine de basket-ball du Zaïre).

== African Championship record ==
- 1981 – 2nd
- 1983 – 1st
- 1984 – 2nd
- 1986 – 1st
- 1990 – 2nd
- 1993 – 4th
- 1994 – 1st
- 1997 – 2nd
- 2000 – 3rd
- 2003 – 7th
- 2005 – 4th
- 2007 – 7th
- 2011 – 7th
- 2017 – 9th
- 2019 – 6th
- 2023 – 12th

== Current roster ==
Roster for the 2023 Women's Afrobasket.

DR Congo women's national basketball team roster
Players
Coaches

Pos.	No.	Name	Age – Date of birth	Height	Club	Ctr.
	4	Liliane Ikete	18 – 22 March 2005		BC Flamurtari Vlorë	(Albania)
	5	Gracia Nguz	31 – 29 June 1992		ASB Makomeno	(Democratic Republic of the Congo)
PG	6	Tania Kokolo	22 – 17 September 2000	1.67 m (5 ft 6 in)	C.N.S.S.	(Democratic Republic of the Congo)
PG	7	Ketia Mbelu	22 – 18 April 2001	1.64 m (5 ft 5 in)	C.N.S.S.	(Democratic Republic of the Congo)
	8	Feza Ebengo	23 – 16 November 1999		REG BBC	(Rwanda)
PF	9	Deorah Kaba	23 – 29 June 2000	1.84 m (6 ft 0 in)	C.N.S.S.	(Democratic Republic of the Congo)
	10	Debarah Washini	24 – 17 May 1999	1.89 m (6 ft 2 in)	C.N.S.S.	(Democratic Republic of the Congo)
G	11	Cecile Nyoka	36 – 18 September 1986	1.77 m (5 ft 10 in)	C.N.S.S.	(Democratic Republic of the Congo)
	12	Mariana Muadi	26 – 4 December 1996		Almería	(Spain)
	13	Malu Irebu	25 – 5 January 1998		C.N.S.S.	(Democratic Republic of the Congo)
	14	Ruth mikemo	34 – 30 September 1988		V-Club	(Morocco)
PF	15	Ginette Mfutila	35 – 20 April 1988	1.88 m (6 ft 2 in)	Reims Basket Féminin	(France)

Head coach

- (Democratic Republic of the Congo) Bellarmin Tshibangu

Assistant coach(es)

- (Democratic Republic of the Congo) Ravane Mwimba

Legend

- Club – describes last
  club before the tournament
- Age – describes age
  on 28 July 2023

== See also ==
- DR Congo women's national under-19 basketball team
