= Senegal women's national basketball team =

National basketball team

Senegal
- FIBA ranking: 22 ▲3 (18 March 2026)
- Joined FIBA: 1962
- FIBA zone: FIBA Africa
- National federation: Fédération Sénégalaise de Basket-Ball
- Coach: Otis Hughley Jr.

Olympic Games
- Appearances: 2

World Cup
- Appearances: 8

AfroBasket
- Appearances: 26
- Medals: (1974, 1977, 1979, 1981, 1984, 1990, 1993, 1997, 2000, 2009, 2015) (1968, 1983, 1994, 2005, 2007, 2011, 2017, 2019, 2023) (1970, 2003, 2013)
Home	Away

The Senegal women's national basketball team is the national basketball team representing Senegal at world and continental basketball competitions for women. It is administered by the Fédération Sénégalaise de Basket-Ball.

The Senegalese squad won 11 continental championships, as many as all other competitors combined.

== History ==
The Senegalese women's national basketball team had won a medal at every FIBA Africa Championship for Women except for the initial one in 1966. This includes 10 gold medals between 1974 and 2000 (9 in 12 tournaments), though Senegal has managed to earn only 1 bronze and 2 silver medals in the 3 tournaments hence. The team has taken part in one Summer Olympics in 2000, where they finished in last place (12th). They finished 16th place at the 2010 FIBA World Championship for Women.

=== FIBA Africa Championship for Women 2007 ===
Senegal played host to the FIBA Africa Championship for Women 2007 qualifying tournament for the 2008 Summer Olympics in Beijing. The squad swept the first round with a 5–0 record and beat the Democratic Republic of the Congo and Mozambique before losing to Mali, despite beating Mali 48–37 just 4 days previously. Senegal qualified for the FIBA World Olympic Qualifying Tournament for Women 2008 in July 2008, in which 12 teams from across the globe competed for 5 spots in the Olympics. Angola also qualified through the FIBA Africa tournament as the third-place finisher. Aya Traore was nominated for the Competition best five.

=== FIBA Africa Championship for Women 2009 ===
Senegal came to the FIBA Africa Championship for Women 2009 at Madagascar for revenge against Mali. The Senegalese team swept the first round with a 5–0 record and beat Nigeria 89–45 and Ivory Coast (75–54 before beating Mali, 72–57. Aya Traore was the Most Valuable Player. Aya Traore, Fatou Dieng and Aminata Nar Diop was nominated for the Competition best five. Senegal qualified for the 2010 FIBA World Championship for Women, in which 16 teams from across the globe competed.

=== FIBA Africa Championship for Women 2011 ===
As the favorite of the 2011 FIBA Africa Championship for Women at Mali, Senegal lost the final after a 7–0 record (12 victories in a row), against the surprisingly Angolan women team, 62–57, despite beating Angola 63–42 just 6 days previously. The Senegalese team beat Rdcongo, 85–54, in the quarterfinal, and Nigeria, 89–63, in the semi-finals. Aya Traore and Mame Diodio Diouf was nominated for the Competition best five. Senegal qualified for the Basketball at the 2012 Summer Olympics – Women's qualification.

=== FIBA Africa Championship for Women 2013 ===
The Senegalese team lost the semi-final game to the champion Angola, 43–46, after winning all 7 matches at the 2013 FIBA Africa Championship for Women at Mozambique. After four finals in row (since 2005), the Senegalese team got third place after its victory against Cameroon, 56–53. Senegal beat Mali, 85–54, in the quarterfinal. Astou Traore was nominated for the Competition best five and got the title of the best scorer of the competition with 133 points.

=== FIBA Africa Championship for Women 2015 ===
Senegal came on the AfroBasket Women 2015 at Cameroon with 9 old players. The Senegalese team won the title after two losing games against Angola, 46–50, and Nigeria, 62–70, in the first round. The teammates of Aya Traore (21 points) opened their turbo in the quarterfinals when they beat the Basketball at the 2015 African Games Champion (10 days before), (57–38). In the semi-finals Astou Traore (17 points), Fatou Dieng (4 assists), Mame Marie Sy (8 rebounds) and their teammates beat the double champion and favorite Angola, 56–54, and got the final ticket for their 17th final and 21st participation. The host team Cameroon played its first final. However, Senegal beat Cameroon, 81–66, earning their twelfth title. Aya Traore got the MVP title for the second time after 2009. She was nominated for the Competition best five. Astou Traore beat the record of the best scorer of all time. Senegal qualified for the 2016 Summer Olympics, in which 12 teams from across the globe competed for the Olympic title.

== Results ==
=== Summer Olympics ===
- 2000 – 12th
- 2016 – 12th

=== World Championship ===
- 1975 – 13th
- 1979 – 12th
- 1990 – 14th
- 1998 – 14th
- 2002 – 15th
- 2006 – 15th
- 2010 – 16th
- 2018 – 12th

=== African Championship ===
- 1966 – 4th
- 1968 – 2nd
- 1970 – 3rd
- 1974 – 1st
- 1977 – 1st
- 1979 – 1st
- 1981 – 1st
- 1983 – 2nd
- 1984 – 1st
- 1990 – 1st
- 1993 – 1st
- 1994 – 2nd
- 1997 – 1st
- 2000 – 1st
- 2003 – 3rd
- 2005 – 2nd
- 2007 – 2nd
- 2009 – 1st
- 2011 – 2nd
- 2013 – 3rd
- 2015 – 1st
- 2017 – 2nd
- 2019 – 2nd
- 2021 – 4th
- 2023 – 2nd
- 2025 – 4th

== Current roster ==
Roster for the 2025 Women's Afrobasket.

Senegal women's national basketball team roster
Players
Coaches

Pos.	No.	Name	Age – Date of birth	Height	Club	Ctr.
PF	00	Nene Ndiaye	21 – 6 January 2004	1.84 m (6 ft 0 in)	Boston College Eagles	(United States)
PG	3	Victorine Thiaw	22 – 3 July 2003	1.67 m (5 ft 6 in)	BC Franconville	(France)
G	8	Cierra Dillard	29 – 8 May 1996	1.75 m (5 ft 9 in)	Hapoel Kfar Saba	(Israel)
C	20	Khadija Faye	22 – 5 November 2002	1.92 m (6 ft 4 in)	Pittsburgh Panthers	(United States)
F	22	Ndioma Kané	25 – 20 December 1999	1.90 m (6 ft 3 in)	Al Ahly	(Egypt)
F	23	Mathilde Diop	28 – 15 June 1997	1.84 m (6 ft 0 in)	St. Pauls BC	(Republic of Ireland)
F	24	Yacine Diop	29 – 8 October 1995	1.78 m (5 ft 10 in)	Yalova VIP	(Turkey)
F	32	Fatou Pouye	28 – 14 January 1997	1.84 m (6 ft 0 in)	ASC Ville de Dakar	(Senegal)
C	34	Khadidiatou Sarr	26 – 22 March 1999	1.90 m (6 ft 3 in)	Saint-Amand Hainaut	(France)
C	35	Madjiguene Sene	30 – 25 October 1994	1.97 m (6 ft 6 in)	Sporting Bkennaya	(Lebanon)
C	41	Sokhna Ndiaye	30 – 15 July 1995	1.90 m (6 ft 3 in)	AS Montferrandaise	(France)
SG	77	Lena Timera	30 – 28 August 1994	1.86 m (6 ft 1 in)	Cavigal Nice Basket	(France)

Head coach

- (United States) Otis Hughley Jr.

Assistant coach(es)

- (Senegal) Khardiata Diop
- (Senegal) Sidy Sali

Legend

- Club – describes last
  club before the tournament
- Age – describes age
  on 26 July 2025

== See also ==
- Senegal women's national under-19 basketball team
- Senegal women's national under-17 basketball team
