= Mali women's national basketball team =

Mali
- FIBA ranking: 18 (18 March 2026)
- Joined FIBA: 1961
- FIBA zone: FIBA Africa
- National federation: Fédération Malienne de Basketball
- Coach: Oumarou Sidiya

Olympic Games
- Appearances: 1

World Cup
- Appearances: 3

AfroBasket
- Appearances: 21
- Medals: (gold) (2007); (silver) (2009, 2021, 2025); (bronze) (1968, 2011, 2017, 2019, 2023)

The Mali women's national basketball team (French: Équipe nationale féminine de basketball du Mali) is the nationally controlled basketball team representing Mali at world basketball competitions for women. The Malian squad had one continental championship, which came in 2007 with a win over host Senegal.

== History ==
The Malian squad won a medal at only two continental tournaments with a bronze medal at the 1968 games and a gold at the 2007 games. The squad qualified for its first Olympic appearance with a win at the 2007 African championship. At the 2010 FIBA World Championship for Women they finished in 15th place.

=== FIBA Africa Championship for Women 2007 ===
Mali traveled to Senegal for the FIBA Africa Championship for Women 2007 qualifying tournament for the 2008 Summer Olympics in Beijing. The squad won the first round with a 4–1 record, losing only to host Senegal. Mali also had the highest positive point differential of any squad in the tournament. In the ensuing rounds, Mali beat Cameroon, followed by Angola. In the championship match, Mali beat Senegal 63–56, qualifying automatically for the 2008 Olympics for the first time. Captain Hamchétou Maïga was voted the MVP of the tournament, while teammate Diéné Diawara grabbed the most rebounds.

== Competitive record ==
=== FIBA World Cup ===
FIBA World Cup record
Year	Round	Pld	W	L
(Czech Republic) 2010	15th	5	1	4
(Australia) 2022	11th	5	0	5
(Germany) 2026	13th	3	1	2
(Japan) 2030	TBD			
Total		13	2	11

=== Summer Olympics ===
Olympic Games record
Year	Position	GP	W	L	GS	GA	GD
(China) 2008	12th	5	0	5	255	402	−147
Total		5	0	5	255	402	−147

=== African Championship ===
- 1968 – 3rd
- 1970 – 4th
- 1974 – 8th
- 1977 – 7th
- 1981 – 4th
- 1984 – 4th
- 1993 – 7th
- 1997 – 6th
- 2000 – 9th
- 2003 – 5th
- 2005 – 5th
- 2007 – 1st
- 2009 – 2nd
- 2011 – 3rd
- 2013 – 5th
- 2015 – 5th
- 2017 – 3rd
- 2019 – 3rd
- 2021 – 2nd
- 2023 – 3rd
- 2025 – 2nd

== Current roster ==
Roster for the 2026 FIBA Women's Basketball World Cup.

Mali women's national basketball team roster
Players
Coaches

Pos.	No.	Name	Age – Date of birth	Height	Club	Ctr.
PF	2	Aminata Sangaré	24 – 10 February 2002	1.85 m (6 ft 1 in)	Baloncesto Leganés	(Spain)
PG	4	Fatoumata Sanou	22 – 30 June 2004	1.55 m (5 ft 1 in)	l'ASFAS	(Mali)
G	9	Djénéba Sangaré	26 – 7 October 1999	1.78 m (5 ft 10 in)	Garonne Avenir Basket du Marmandais	(France)
PF	10	Maimouna Haidara	22 – 2 June 2004	1.87 m (6 ft 2 in)	CB Cidade de Lugo	(Spain)
PF	12	Alima Dembélé	26 – 20 January 2000	1.86 m (6 ft 1 in)	Azulmarino Palma	(Spain)
C	13	Mama Cissé	22 – 3 September 2004	1.83 m (6 ft 0 in)	Canet en Roussillon Basket Club	(France)
C	15	Naîgnouma Coulibaly	37 – 31 May 1989	1.91 m (6 ft 3 in)	AS Police	(Mali)
F	22	Kamita Dabou	21 – 9 November 2004	1.79 m (5 ft 10 in)	ASA Sceaux	(France)
PF	23	Sika Koné	24 – 13 July 2002	1.90 m (6 ft 3 in)	Atlanta Dream	(United States)
G	50	Djeneba N'Diaye (C)	29 – 8 July 1997	1.65 m (5 ft 5 in)	CB Islas Canarias	(Spain)
G	52	Rokia Doumbia	27 – 5 May 1999	1.75 m (5 ft 9 in)	California Golden Bears	(United States)
C	77	Diana Balayera	30 – 28 January 1996	1.91 m (6 ft 3 in)	DVTK Huntherm	(Hungary)

Head coach

- (Mali) Oumarou Sidiya

Assistant coach(es)

- (Mali) Diana Gandega
- (Mali) Kaba Kante

Legend

- (C) Team captain
- Club – describes last
  club before the tournament
- Age – describes age
  on 4 September 2026
