= Mozambique women's national basketball team =

Mozambique
- FIBA ranking: 34 ▼2 (18 March 2026)
- Joined FIBA: 1978
- FIBA zone: FIBA Africa
- National federation: Federação Moçambicana de Basquetebol
- Coach: Nasir Salé

World Cup
- Appearances: 1

AfroBasket
- Appearances: 19
- Medals: Silver (1986, 2003, 2013); Bronze (1990, 1993, 2005)

The Mozambique women's national basketball team is the official team representing Mozambique in international women's basketball competitions.

== Competition record ==
=== FIBA World Championship ===
- 2014 – 15th

=== FIBA Africa Championship ===
- 1983 – 4th
- 1984 – 5th
- 1986 – 2nd
- 1990 – 3rd
- 1993 – 3rd
- 1994 – 4th
- 2000 – 6th
- 2003 – 2nd
- 2005 – 3rd
- 2007 – 4th
- 2009 – 6th
- 2011 – 5th
- 2013 – 2nd
- 2015 – 6th
- 2017 – 4th
- 2019 – 4th
- 2021 – 5th
- 2023 – 5th
- 2025 – 6th

== Current roster ==
Roster for the 2025 Women's Afrobasket.

Mozambique women's national basketball team roster
Players
Coaches
1 1

Pos.	No.	Name	Age – Date of birth	Height	Club	Ctr.
PG	0	Bruna Argelio	25 – 24 December 1999	1.64 m (5 ft 5 in)	Ferroviário de Maputo	(Mozambique)
SG	1	Silvia Veloso	26 – 18 October 1998	1.72 m (5 ft 8 in)	Ferroviário de Maputo	(Mozambique)
PG	4	Delma Zita	27 – 27 March 1998	1.72 m (5 ft 8 in)	Ferroviário de Maputo	(Mozambique)
C	5	Nilza Chiziane	33 – 27 February 1992	1.88 m (6 ft 2 in)	Costa do Sol	(Mozambique)
F	6	Ingvild Mucauro	32 – 12 September 1992	1.78 m (5 ft 10 in)	Ferroviário de Maputo	(Mozambique)
F	10	Chanaya Pinto	25 – 26 June 2000	1.85 m (6 ft 1 in)
PF	11	Leia Dongue	34 – 24 May 1991	1.85 m (6 ft 1 in)	OBG Roma	(Italy)
C	15	Vilma Covane	28 – 10 October 1996	1.80 m (5 ft 11 in)	Costa do Sol	(Mozambique)
C	18	Carla Covane	26 – 23 June 1999	1.89 m (6 ft 2 in)	Ferroviário de Maputo	(Mozambique)
PF	23	Stefania Chiziane	28 – 26 December 1996	1.79 m (5 ft 10 in)	Ferroviário de Maputo	(Mozambique)
C	24	Hulda Joaquim	25 – 4 May 2000	1.83 m (6 ft 0 in)	Ferroviário de Maputo	(Mozambique)
PF	26	Iolanda Francisco	26 – 20 August 1998	1.83 m (6 ft 0 in)	Ferroviário da Beira	(Mozambique)

Head coach

- (Mozambique) Nasir Salé

Assistant coach(es)

- (Mozambique) Carlos Dezanove

Legend

- Club – describes last
  club before the tournament
- Age – describes age
  on 26 July 2025
