= 2023 FIBA Women's AfroBasket qualification =

The 2023 FIBA Women's AfroBasket qualification was played on various dates in 2023 to determine the seven teams who qualified for the 2023 FIBA Women's AfroBasket. Teams competed with other teams in their respective zones for a spot in the championship tournament. There were seven zones in total.

== Participating teams ==
Zone 1
Team	Pos

Zone 2
Team	Pos
Guinea	54

Zone 3
Team	Pos
Ivory Coast	54

Zone 4
Team	Pos
DR Congo	74
Gabon	82

Zone 5
Team	Pos
Egypt	42
Kenya	68
Rwanda	88
Uganda	89
South Sudan	113

Zone 6
Team	Pos
Angola	46
Mozambique	47
~~South Africa~~	102
Zimbabwe	105
Zambia	NR

Zone 7
Team	Pos

Did not enter
- Benin
- Botswana
- Burkina Faso
- Burundi
- Central African Republic
- Chad
- Congo
- Equatorial Guinea
- Eritrea
- Eswatini
- Ethiopia
- Ghana
- Lesotho
- Liberia
- Malawi
- Namibia
- Niger
- São Tomé and Príncipe
- Somalia
- Sudan
- Tanzania
- Togo
- Tunisia

== Zone 2 / Zone 3 ==
Two teams played to determine the qualified team from 30 June to 2 July 2023 in Abidjan, Ivory Coast. Originally, six teams entered the tournament.

=== Overview ===
Team 1	Agg.	Team 2	1st leg	2nd leg
Ivory Coast	179–101	Guinea	81–55	98–46

=== Games ===
30 June 2023	Ivory Coast	81–55	Guinea	Abidjan
13:00	Scoring by quarter: 12–13, 24–14, 23–14, 22–14
	Pts: Ouraga 14; Rebs: Sieza 10; Asts: three players 4	Boxscore	Pts: Kaba 26; Rebs: Kaba 10; Asts: Jallow, Kaba 3	Arena: Palais des Sports de Treichville

2 July 2023	Guinea	46–98	Ivory Coast	Abidjan, Ivory Coast
13:00	Scoring by quarter: 11–14, 11–30, 21–26, 3–28
	Pts: Kaba 19; Rebs: Diallo 8 Asts: Mbaye 4	Boxscore	Pts: Bognini 18; Rebs: Sieza 12; Asts: Kolga 6	Arena: Palais des Sports de Treichville

== Zone 4 ==
Two teams played a two-game series to determine the qualified team.

=== Overview ===
Team 1	Agg.	Team 2	1st leg	2nd leg
DR Congo	222–85	Gabon	121–32	101–53

=== Games ===
24 March 2023	DR Congo	121–32	Gabon	Yaoundé, Cameroon
13:00	Scoring by quarter: 26–10, 34–13, 31–0, 30–9
	Pts: Nyoka 25; Rebs: Kaba 14; Asts: Nyoka 8	Boxscore	Pts: Abagha, Angue 9 Rebs: Balowa, Oroki 5 Asts: Assengone 4	Arena: Yaoundé Multipurpose Sports Complex

25 March 2023	Gabon	53–101	DR Congo	Yaoundé, Cameroon
13:00	Scoring by quarter: 6–32, 10–22, 21–24, 16–23
	Pts: Assengone 14; Rebs: Assengone 12; Asts: Balowa 3	Boxscore	Pts: Ngobeleza 26; Rebs: Basiki 8 Asts: Kokolo 7	Arena: Yaoundé Multipurpose Sports Complex

== Zone 5 ==
Five teams played to finalize one teams who qualifies. The tournament was played in Kampala, Uganda from 14 to 19 February 2023.

=== Preliminary round ===
Pos	Team	Pld	W	L	PF	PA	PD	Pts	Qualification
1	Egypt	4	3	1	352	267	+85	7 (Note: Egypt 3 Pts, +24 PD; Uganda 3 Pts, −7 PD; Kenya 3 Pts, −17 PD)	Final
2	Uganda (H)	4	3	1	291	269	+22	7	Final
3	Kenya	4	3	1	267	244	+23	7	Third place game
4	South Sudan	4	1	3	226	277	−51	5	Third place game
5	Rwanda (Note: Rwanda as final tournament hosts, automatically qualified regardless of their results)	4	0	4	224	303	−79	4	

Source: FIBA
Rules for classification: 1) Points; 2) Head-to-head; 3) Points difference; 4) Points scored.
(H) Hosts
Notes:

14 February 2023	South Sudan	68–83	Egypt	Kampala
17:00	Scoring by quarter: 14–19, 19–26, 10–18, 25–20
	Pts: Bulgak 16; Rebs: Bulgak 20; Asts: Teny 5	Boxscore	Pts: El-Gedawy 23; Rebs: Aly 8 Asts: Deghady 6	Arena: MTN Arena Lugogo

14 February 2023	Uganda	53–61	Kenya	Kampala
20:00	Scoring by quarter: 7–16, 18–18, 17–9, 11–18
	Pts: Otto 11; Rebs: Akello 9 Asts: Nakiyingi 6	Boxscore	Pts: Wanyama 15; Rebs: Okot 20; Asts: Okot 3	Arena: MTN Arena Lugogo

15 February 2023	Rwanda	40–54	South Sudan	Kampala
17:00	Scoring by quarter: 13–8, 11–13, 12–18, 4–15
	Pts: Mwizerwa 8 Rebs: Uwizeye 9 Asts: Richardson 4	Boxscore	Pts: Teny 18; Rebs: Bulgak 12; Asts: Bulgak 5	Arena: MTN Arena Lugogo

15 February 2023	Egypt	85–86	Uganda	Kampala
20:00	Scoring by quarter: 28–22, 10–28, 23–22, 24–14
	Pts: El-Gedawy 22; Rebs: El-Gedawy 14; Asts: Moussa 10	Boxscore	Pts: Otto 27; Rebs: Otto 14; Asts: Ekone 5	Arena: MTN Arena Lugogo

16 February 2023	Kenya	69–58	Rwanda	Kampala
17:00	Scoring by quarter: 17–5, 12–20, 19–21, 21–12
	Pts: Wanyama 16; Rebs: Okot 10; Asts: Mwangale 7	Boxscore	Pts: Tetero 18; Rebs: Umugwaneza 15; Asts: Micomyiza, Tetero 3	Arena: MTN Arena Lugogo

16 February 2023	Uganda	74–53	South Sudan	Kampala
20:00	Scoring by quarter: 23–15, 14–16, 20–7, 17–15
	Pts: Akello 14; Rebs: Najjuma 18; Asts: Ekone 4	Boxscore	Pts: Macuei 15; Rebs: Macuei 17; Asts: Tac 2	Arena: MTN Arena Lugogo

17 February 2023	Rwanda	56–102	Egypt	Kampala
17:00	Scoring by quarter: 14–26, 14–24, 13–27, 15–25
	Pts: Uwizeye 15; Rebs: Uwizeye 7 Asts: Imanizabayo 7	Boxscore	Pts: Sherif 18; Rebs: Hussein 12; Asts: Deghady 6	Arena: MTN Arena Lugogo

17 February 2023	South Sudan	51–80	Kenya	Kampala
20:00	Scoring by quarter: 15–21, 10–15, 10–20, 16–24
	Pts: Bulgak 10; Rebs: Bulgak 16; Asts: Bulgak, Tac 3	Boxscore	Pts: Akinyi, Reynolds 17; Rebs: Okot 18; Asts: Otieno, Reynolds 4	Arena: MTN Arena Lugogo

18 February 2023	Egypt	82–57	Kenya	Kampala
15:00	Scoring by quarter: 21–16, 28–13, 14–10, 19–18
	Pts: El-Gedawy 23; Rebs: El-Gedawy 11; Asts: Moussa 7	Boxscore	Pts: Wanyama 13; Rebs: Akinyi 12; Asts: Mwangale 5	Arena: MTN Arena Lugogo

18 February 2023	Uganda	78–70	Rwanda	Kampala
18:00	Scoring by quarter: 23–9, 18–24, 17–17, 20–20
	Pts: Otto 22; Rebs: Otto 13; Asts: Akello, Otto 4	Boxscore	Pts: Uwizeye 19; Rebs: Uwizeye 11; Asts: Imanizabayo 5	Arena: MTN Arena Lugogo

=== Third place game ===
19 February 2023	Kenya	64–30	South Sudan	Kampala
15:00	Scoring by quarter: 12–11, 17–5, 17–8, 18–6
	Pts: Okot 18; Rebs: Okot 16; Asts: Otieno 7	Boxscore	Pts: Leime 10; Rebs: Leime 9 Asts: Wol 2	Arena: MTN Arena Lugogo

=== Final ===
19 February 2023	Egypt	74–65	Uganda	Kampala
18:00	Scoring by quarter: 20–19, 20–19, 19–15, 15–12
	Pts: El-Gedawy 19; Rebs: El-Gedawy 12; Asts: Moussa 6	Boxscore	Pts: Ekone 25; Rebs: Akello 13; Asts: Otto 4	Arena: MTN Arena Lugogo

== Zone 6 ==
Four teams played to determine the team who qualifies. The tournament was held in Bulawayo, Zimbabwe from 21 to 28 February 2023. South Africa withdrew before the tournament.

=== Preliminary round ===
Pos	Team	Pld	W	L	PF	PA	PD	Pts	Qualification
1	Mozambique	6	6	0	519	301	+218	12	Final
2	Angola	6	4	2	407	282	+125	10	Final
3	Zimbabwe (H)	6	2	4	258	390	−132	8	Third place game
4	Zambia	6	0	6	292	503	−211	6	Third place game

Source: FIBA
Rules for classification: 1) Points; 2) Head-to-head; 3) Points difference; 4) Points scored.
(H) Hosts

21 February 2023	Angola	52–74	Mozambique	Bulawayo
14:00	Scoring by quarter: 20–19, 17–22, 3–23, 12–10
	Pts: Matiquite 16; Rebs: Matiquite 6 Asts: Lucas 2	Boxscore	Pts: Mabjaia 17; Rebs: three players 2 Asts: three players 1	Arena: ZITF Hall 3

21 February 2023	Zambia	57–69	Zimbabwe	Bulawayo
18:00	Scoring by quarter: 11–17, 16–21, 13–15, 17–16
	Pts: Chella 12; Rebs: Kawagu 5 Asts: Kalala 3	Boxscore	Pts: Chamwarura 21; Rebs: Mabika 10; Asts: Mabika 7	Arena: ZITF Hall 3 Referees: Dorothy Okatch (BOT), Antonio Sitoe (MOZ), Carlota Churane (MOZ)

22 February 2023	Mozambique	87–51	Zambia	Bulawayo
14:00	Scoring by quarter: 24–6, 33–19, 17–16, 13–10
	Pts: Mafanela 13; Rebs: Rafael 10; Asts: Agostinho 4	Boxscore	Pts: Mwamba 9 Rebs: Maseko 5 Asts: Ziko 3	Arena: ZITF Hall 3

22 February 2023	Zimbabwe	41–105	Angola	Bulawayo
16:00	Scoring by quarter: 8–32, 15–23, 9–29, 9–21
	Pts: Mabika 19; Rebs: Mabika 7 Asts: Maroto 3	Boxscore	Pts: Matiquite 18; Rebs: Matiquite 10; Asts: Lucas 4	Arena: ZITF Hall 3

23 February 2023	Angola	92–61	Zambia	Bulawayo
14:00	Scoring by quarter: 36–13, 23–23, 15–12, 18–23
	Pts: Matiquite 23; Rebs: Matiquite 8 Asts: Lucas 4	Boxscore	Pts: Chella 24; Rebs: Chella 6 Asts: four players 2	Arena: ZITF Hall 3

23 February 2023	Mozambique	95–43	Zimbabwe	Bulawayo
16:00	Scoring by quarter: 19–7, 27–16, 29–9, 20–12
	Pts: Agostinho, Chiziane 14; Rebs: Chiziane, Rafael 7 Asts: Mutombene 5	Boxscore	Pts: Maroto 15; Rebs: Mabika 17; Asts: Katsatse 3	Arena: ZITF Hall 3

24 February 2023	Zambia	32–85	Angola	Bulawayo
14:00	Scoring by quarter: 5–19, 19–25, 11–16, 6–25
	Pts: Chella 13; Rebs: Chella 9 Asts: Ziko 2	Boxscore	Pts: Barbosa 16; Rebs: Peso 14; Asts: Gala 4	Arena: ZITF Hall 3

24 February 2023	Zimbabwe	38–86	Mozambique	Bulawayo
16:00	Scoring by quarter: 7–14, 13–30, 10–19, 8–23
	Pts: Chawayipira 18; Rebs: Mhembere 5 Asts: Katsatse 5	Boxscore	Pts: Rafael 16; Rebs: Covane 13; Asts: Veloso 4	Arena: ZITF Hall 3

25 February 2023	Zambia	44–103	Mozambique	Bulawayo
14:00	Scoring by quarter: 8–31, 16–33, 10–27, 10–12
	Pts: three players 7 Rebs: Kalala 5 Asts: Chella 2	Boxscore	Pts: Chiziane 20; Rebs: da Conceição, Veloso 9 Asts: Chiziane 5	Arena: ZITF Hall 3

25 February 2023	Angola	89–38	Zimbabwe	Bulawayo
16:00	Scoring by quarter: 22–11, 27–11, 17–8, 23–8
	Pts: Antonio 22; Rebs: Peso 11; Asts: Sindalawa 5	Boxscore	Pts: Mabika 13; Rebs: Mabika 6 Asts: Katsatse, Maroto 2	Arena: ZITF Hall 3

26 February 2023	Mozambique	74–73	Angola	Bulawayo
14:00	Scoring by quarter: 21–25, 24–18, 14–9, 15–21
	Pts: Agostinho 19; Rebs: Agostinho 8 Asts: four players 2	Boxscore	Pts: Lucas 24; Rebs: Manuel 11; Asts: Matiquite, Pascoal 2	Arena: ZITF Hall 3

26 February 2023	Zimbabwe	67–47	Zambia	Bulawayo
16:00	Scoring by quarter: 9–16, 13–10, 19–14, 26–7
	Pts: Mabika 20; Rebs: Mabika 11; Asts: Maroto 7	Boxscore	Pts: Kawagu, Mulambo 8 Rebs: Kawagu, Mulambo 11; Asts: Mwachambo 4	Arena: ZITF Hall 3

=== Third place game ===
28 February 2023	Zimbabwe	70–50	Zambia	Bulawayo
14:00	Scoring by quarter: 23–14, 17–14, 8–17, 22–5
	Pts: Chamwarura 26; Rebs: Mabika 12; Asts: Chamwarura 3	Boxscore	Pts: Chella, Mwachambo 8 Rebs: Kawagu 21; Asts: Samuwika 3	Arena: ZITF Hall 3

=== Final ===
28 February 2023	Mozambique	92–80	Angola	Bulawayo
16:00	Scoring by quarter: 27–24, 18–16, 20–30, 25–12
	Pts: Agostinho 32; Rebs: Agostinho 7 Asts: Chiziane 5	Boxscore	Pts: Matiquite 23; Rebs: Matiquite 12; Asts: Lucas, Pascoal 2	Arena: ZITF Hall 3

== Qualified teams ==
Country	Qualified as	Date of qualification	Last appearance	Best placement in tournament	WR
Rwanda	Host nation	25 May 2023	2011	Ninth place (2009, 2011)	88
Nigeria	2021 Women's AfroBasket semi-finalists	23 September 2021	2021	Champions (2003, 2005, 2017, 2019, 2021)	15
Senegal	2021 Women's AfroBasket semi-finalists	23 September 2021	2021	Champions (1974, 1977, 1979, 1981, 1984, 1990, 1993, 1997, 2000, 2009, 2015)	31
Cameroon	2021 Women's AfroBasket semi-finalists	23 September 2021	2021	Runners-up (2015)	50
Mali	2021 Women's AfroBasket semi-finalists	23 September 2021	2021	Champions (2007)	26
Egypt	Zone 5 winner	19 February 2023	2021	Champions (1966, 1968)	42
Mozambique	Zone 6 winner	28 February 2023	2021	Runners-up (1986, 2003, 2013)	47
DR Congo	Zone 4 winner	25 March 2023	2019	Champions (1983, 1986, 1994)	74
Angola	Wildcard	9 June 2023	2021	Champions (2011, 2013)	48
Uganda	Wildcard	9 June 2023	2015	Ninth place (1997)	80
Ivory Coast	Zone 2 / Zone 3 winner	2 July 2023	2021	Fourth place (1977, 2009)	54
Guinea	Wildcard	3 July 2023	2021	Runners-up (1966)	99

== Statistical leaders ==
=== Player averages ===
As of 28 February 2023

Category	Player	Team	Average
Points	Raneem El-Gedawy	Egypt	19.6
Rebounds	Madina Okot	Kenya	14.4
Assists	Reem Moussa	Egypt	6.8
Steals	Raneem El-Gedawy	Egypt	4.4
Blocks	Rose Macuei	South Sudan	2.0
Minutes	Jannon Jaye Otto	Uganda	37.1
Efficiency	Raneem El-Gedawy	Egypt	20.6

=== Team averages ===
Category	Team	Average
Points	Mozambique	87.0
Rebounds	Kenya	61.0
Assists	Egypt	19.6
Steals	Kenya	14.0
Blocks	South Sudan	4.0
Efficiency	Mozambique	103.4
