= 2025 FIBA Women's AfroBasket =

Women's basketball tournament in Ivory Coast

27th FIBA Women's African Basketball Championship

Tournament details
- Host country: Ivory Coast
- City: Abidjan
- Dates: 26 July – 3 August
- Teams: 12 (from 1 confederation)
- Venue: 1 (in 1 host city)

Final positions
- Champions: Nigeria (7th title)
- Runners-up: Mali
- Third place: South Sudan
- Fourth place: Senegal

Tournament statistics
- Games played: 28
- MVP: (Nigeria) Amy Okonkwo
- Top scorer: (Egypt) Raneem El-Gedawy (20.3 ppg)

Official website
- www.fiba.basketball

The 2025 FIBA Women's AfroBasket was the 27th edition of this biennial championship organized by FIBA Africa. The tournament was held in Abidjan, Ivory Coast from 26 July to 3 August 2025.

Nigeria were the four-time defending champions, and won the title again after a win over Mali in the final, 78–64. Nigeria's win means they have broken the record for the most championship titles consecutively with five, beating the previous record of held by Senegal who had four. The players in Nigeria's team have been offered $100,000 for their achievement.

South Sudan's third-place finish marks the best result by a debutant since Cameroon's third place in 1983.

As a result of winning, Nigeria qualified for the 2026 FIBA Women's Basketball World Cup, while Mali, South Sudan and Senegal qualified for the 2026 FIBA Women's Basketball World Cup Qualifying Tournaments as a result of placing in the top four.

== Host selection ==
- Ivory Coast

Ivory Coast won the hosting rights for the first time ever on 26 March 2024. Ivory Coast previously bid for 2021 before they withdraw which was eventually awarded to Cameroon.

== Qualification ==
Map of qualifiers for the 2025 FIBA Women's AfroBasket: Team qualified for the 2025 FIBA Women's AfroBasket Team failed to qualify Did not enter

Excluding the hosts and automatically qualified teams, nine teams entered regional qualification.

Games were played from August 2024 to February 2025, to determine the 12 nations who will qualify for the tournament.

Of the qualified teams, eleven appeared at the previous edition. Due to the lack of teams taking part, FIBA Africa awarded four wildcards rather than the usual two. Those teams were Egypt, Guinea, Mozambique and South Sudan.

After being given a wildcard South Sudan have qualified for the first time ever.

After appearing in 2023, DR Congo misses out.

Uganda will participate in their second consecutive appearance for the first time ever, while Egypt break their record for consecutive appearances with seven. Hosts Ivory Coast continue their record appearance streak to five.

=== Qualified teams ===
Team	Qualification method	Date of qualification	Appearance(s)				Previous best performance (Note: Bold text indicates they hosted that edition.)	WR (Note: World ranking at start of tournament.)
Team	Qualification method	Date of qualification	Total	First	Last	Streak	Previous best performance	WR
Ivory Coast	Host nation	26 March 2024	16th	1977	2023	5	Fourth place (1977, 2009)	48
Nigeria	2023 Women's AfroBasket semi-finalists	26 March 2024	15th	1974	2023	12	**Champions** (Six times) (Note: Nigeria have won in 2003, 2005, 2017, 2019, 2021 and 2023.)	12
Senegal	2023 Women's AfroBasket semi-finalists	26 March 2024	26th	1966	2023	17	**Champions** (Eleven times) (Note: Senegal have won in 1974, 1977, 1979, 1981, 1984, 1990, 1993, 1997, 2000, 2009 and 2015.)	25
Mali	2023 Women's AfroBasket semi-finalists	26 March 2024	21st	1968	2023	14	**Champions** (2007)	20
Rwanda	2023 Women's AfroBasket semi-finalists	26 March 2024	4th	2009	2023	2	Fourth place (**2023**)	74
Cameroon	Zone 4 winner	21 August 2024	15th	1983	2023	10	Runners-up (**2015**)	41
Angola	Zone 6 winner	4 February 2025	21st	1981	2023	21	**Champions** (2011, 2013)	46
Uganda	Zone 5 winner	8 February 2025	4th	1997	2023	2	Seventh place (2023)	55
Egypt	Wildcard	8 March 2025	15th	1966	2023	7	**Champions** (1966, **1968**)	37
Mozambique	Wildcard	8 March 2025	19th	1983	2023	13	Runners-up (1986, **2003**, **2013**)	32
South Sudan	Wildcard	25 March 2025	1st	Debut				86
Guinea	Wildcard	20 April 2025	11th	1966	2023	3	Runners-up (**1966**)	91

== Venue ==
Similar to the AfroBasket 2013 on the men's side, the Palais des Sports de Treichville will host the tournament.

2025 FIBA Women's AfroBasket is located in Ivory Coast	Abidjan
2025 FIBA Women's AfroBasket is located in Ivory Coast	Palais des Sports de Treichville
2025 FIBA Women's AfroBasket is located in Ivory Coast	Capacity: 3,500

== Final draw ==
External videos
- Draw

The final draw took place at 20:00 GMT on 23 April 2025 at the Hôtel des Armées in Abidjan, Ivory Coast. The final draw was hosted by television presenter, Mariam Coulibaly, and former basketball player, Malick Daho. The draw started with the teams in pot 1 being placed into their respective groups. Teams in pot 1 were then put into position 1 in each group. After that, pots 2 and 3 were drawn, with each team selected then allocated into the first available group alphabetically. The position for the teams in pots 2 and 3 within the group would then be drawn (for the purpose of the schedule). The only restriction was that only one team from Zone 5 and 6 can be in the same group.

=== Seeding ===
The seeding was revealed on 20 April 2025. The seeding was based on the FIBA World Rankings as of 9 February 2025.

Pot 1
Team	Pos
Ivory Coast	53
Nigeria	11
Senegal	27
Mali	24

Pot 2
Team	Pos
Egypt	37
Rwanda	65
South Sudan	86
Uganda	52

Pot 3
Team	Pos
Angola	46
Cameroon	42
Guinea	91
Mozambique	32

=== Draw ===
Group A
Pos	Team
A1	Ivory Coast
A2	Egypt
A3	Angola

Group B
Pos	Team
B1	Mali
B2	Cameroon
B3	South Sudan

Group C
Pos	Team
C1	Senegal
C2	Uganda
C3	Guinea

Group D
Pos	Team
D1	Nigeria
D2	Mozambique
D3	Rwanda

== Referees ==
The following 18 referees were selected for the tournament.

- (Algeria) Adlen Larouci
- (Algeria) Imene Tahmi
- (Angola) David Domingos
- (Benin) Silver Houngbedji
- (Botswana) Dorothy Okatch
- (Cameroon) Guy Sani
- (Egypt) Aya Ahmed
- (Estonia) Mihkel Männiste
- (Ethiopia) Walelign Gebeto
- (Ivory Coast) Nadege Zouzou
- (Kenya) Erick Otieno
- (Mali) Fanta Touré
- (Mali) Youssouf Maïga
- (Namibia) Sarty Nghixulifwa
- (Puerto Rico) Julirys Guzmán
- (Rwanda) Didier Gaga
- (Spain) Ariadna Chueca
- (Tunisia) Arbia Belghith

== Squads ==
Each nation has to submit a list of 12 players.

== Preliminary round ==
All times are local (UTC±0).

=== Group A ===
Pos	Team	Pld	W	L	PF	PA	PD	Pts	Qualification
1	Ivory Coast (H)	2	2	0	157	137	+20	4	Quarterfinals
2	Egypt	2	1	1	133	129	+4	3	Qualification to Quarterfinals
3	Angola	2	0	2	128	152	−24	2	Qualification to Quarterfinals

Source: FIBA
Rules for classification: 1) Points; 2) Head-to-head results; 3) Points difference; 4) Points scored.
(H) Hosts

26 July 2025
18:30

Boxscore

Ivory Coast	75–63	Egypt
Scoring by quarter: 21–12, 23–27, 17–7, 14–17
Pts: Sahie 23; Rebs: Diaby 10; Asts: Ouraga 4		Pts: El-Gedawy 18; Rebs: El-Gedawy 14; Asts: El-Shabrawy 4

Palais des Sports de Treichville, Abidjan
Attendance: 3,000
Referees: Julirys Guzmán (PUR), Adlen Larouci (ALG), Guy Sani (CMR)

27 July 2025
15:00

Boxscore

Egypt	70–54	Angola
Scoring by quarter: 16–14, 19–9, 20–11, 15–20
Pts: Abdelgawad 20; Rebs: El-Gedawy 10; Asts: Abouelghait, Ibrahim 3		Pts: Caetano 18; Rebs: Antonio, Caetano 7 Asts: Caetano, Dizeko 3

Palais des Sports de Treichville, Abidjan
Referees: Mihkel Männiste (EST), Silver Houngbedji (BEN), Didier Gaga (RWA)

28 July 2025
18:00

Boxscore

Angola	74–82	Ivory Coast
Scoring by quarter: 20–27, 19–19, 22–18, 13–18
Pts: Dizeko 21; Rebs: Dizeko 8 Asts: Lucas 4		Pts: Kaiser 21; Rebs: Diaby 9 Asts: Kaiser 11

Palais des Sports de Treichville, Abidjan
Referees: Ariadna Chueca (ESP), Sarty Nghixulifwa (NAM), Erick Otieno (KEN)

=== Group B ===
Pos	Team	Pld	W	L	PF	PA	PD	Pts	Qualification
1	Mali	2	2	0	130	102	+28	4	Quarterfinals
2	Cameroon	2	1	1	119	138	−19	3	Qualification to Quarterfinals
3	South Sudan	2	0	2	116	125	−9	2	Qualification to Quarterfinals

Source: FIBA
Rules for classification: 1) Points; 2) Head-to-head results; 3) Points difference; 4) Points scored.

26 July 2025
21:30

Boxscore

Mali	55–53	South Sudan
Scoring by quarter: 19–15, 11–15, 16–11, 9–12
Pts: Dembélé 18; Rebs: Dembélé, Koné 7 Asts: Doumbia 3		Pts: Diew, Washington 18; Rebs: Washington 12; Asts: Deng 3

Palais des Sports de Treichville, Abidjan
Referees: Ariadna Chueca (ESP), Arbia Belghith (TUN), Dorothy Okatch (BOT)

27 July 2025
21:00

Boxscore

South Sudan	63–70	Cameroon
Scoring by quarter: 16–17, 16–14, 11–19, 20–20
Pts: Bulgak, Diew 16; Rebs: Bulgak 10; Asts: Washington 8		Pts: Thomas 19; Rebs: Fankam 13; Asts: Thomas 5

Palais des Sports de Treichville, Abidjan
Referees: Ariadna Chueca (ESP), Erick Otieno (KEN), David Domingos (ANG)

28 July 2025
21:00

Boxscore

Cameroon	49–75	Mali
Scoring by quarter: 9–18, 11–17, 14–16, 15–24
Pts: Belleka 14; Rebs: Fankam 6 Asts: Thomas 4		Pts: Koné 15; Rebs: Koné 16; Asts: Sissoko 5

Palais des Sports de Treichville, Abidjan
Referees: Mihkel Männiste (EST), Adlen Larouci (ALG), Didier Gaga (RWA)

=== Group C ===
Pos	Team	Pld	W	L	PF	PA	PD	Pts	Qualification
1	Uganda	2	2	0	161	121	+40	4	Quarterfinals
2	Senegal	2	1	1	162	121	+41	3	Qualification to Quarterfinals
3	Guinea	2	0	2	99	180	−81	2	Qualification to Quarterfinals

Source: FIBA
Rules for classification: 1) Points; 2) Head-to-head results; 3) Points difference; 4) Points scored.

26 July 2025
11:30

Boxscore

Senegal	92–48	Guinea
Scoring by quarter: 23–15, 24–13, 13–14, 32–6
Pts: Kané 20; Rebs: Dillard 9 Asts: three players 5		Pts: Kaba 19; Rebs: Jallow 7 Asts: Jallow, Soumah 3

Palais des Sports de Treichville, Abidjan
Referees: Nadege Zouzou (CIV), Sarty Nghixulifwa (NAM), Aya Ahmed (EGY)

27 July 2025
12:00

Boxscore

Guinea	51–88	Uganda
Scoring by quarter: 19–24, 12–21, 12–28, 8–15
Pts: Kaba 18; Rebs: Kaba 11; Asts: Jallow, Mara 6		Pts: Akullu 26; Rebs: Akello, Akullu 7 Asts: Asinde, Nyamwenge 7

Palais des Sports de Treichville, Abidjan
Referees: Dorothy Okatch (BOT), Nadege Zouzou (CIV), Walelign Gebeto (ETH)

28 July 2025
12:00

Boxscore

Uganda	73–70 (OT)	Senegal
Scoring by quarter: 17–16, 20–12, 8–21, 16–12, Overtime: 12–9
Pts: Robinson 19; Rebs: Asinde 11; Asts: Asinde 7		Pts: Dillard 15; Rebs: Ndiaye 11; Asts: Dillard 6

Palais des Sports de Treichville, Abidjan
Referees: Guy Sani (CMR), Imene Tahmi (ALG), David Domingos (ANG)

=== Group D ===
Pos	Team	Pld	W	L	PF	PA	PD	Pts	Qualification
1	Nigeria	2	2	0	152	100	+52	4	Quarterfinals
2	Mozambique	2	1	1	127	115	+12	3	Qualification to Quarterfinals
3	Rwanda	2	0	2	100	164	−64	2	Qualification to Quarterfinals

Source: FIBA
Rules for classification: 1) Points; 2) Head-to-head results; 3) Points difference; 4) Points scored.

26 July 2025
14:30

Boxscore

Nigeria	92–45	Rwanda
Scoring by quarter: 17–8, 28–17, 26–12, 21–8
Pts: Balogun 18; Rebs: Kunaiyi-Akpannah 9 Asts: Amukamara 6		Pts: Philoxy 11; Rebs: Murekatete 9 Asts: Philoxy 5

Palais des Sports de Treichville, Abidjan
Referees: Mihkel Männiste (EST), Fanta Touré (MLI), Imene Tahmi (ALG)

27 July 2025
18:00

Boxscore

Rwanda	55–72	Mozambique
Scoring by quarter: 15–22, 16–20, 17–13, 7–17
Pts: Philoxy 15; Rebs: Murekatete 7 Asts: Philoxy 3		Pts: Covane 15; Rebs: Dongue 9 Asts: Zita 7

Palais des Sports de Treichville, Abidjan
Referees: Julirys Guzmán (PUR), Fanta Touré (MLI), Youssouf Maïga (MLI)

28 July 2025
15:00

Boxscore

Mozambique	55–60	Nigeria
Scoring by quarter: 13–9, 15–15, 15–18, 12–18
Pts: Mucauro 16; Rebs: Mucauro 8 Asts: Mucauro 4		Pts: Kalu 16; Rebs: Musa 12; Asts: Kalu 4

Palais des Sports de Treichville, Abidjan
Referees: Julirys Guzmán (PUR), Arbia Belghith (TUN), Aya Ahmed (EGY)

== Knockout stage ==
=== Bracket ===
Qualification to QF
30 July
Senegal	80
Rwanda	37
30 July
Cameroon	85
Angola	64
30 July
Mozambique	91
Guinea	38
30 July
Egypt	65
South Sudan	75

Quarterfinals
31 July
Ivory Coast	60
Senegal	66
31 July
Nigeria	83
Cameroon	47
31 July
Mali	86
Mozambique	68
31 July
Uganda	68
South Sudan	69

Semifinals
2 August
Senegal	68
Nigeria	75
2 August
Mali	76
South Sudan	50

Final
3 August
Nigeria	78
Mali	64
Third place game
3 August
Senegal	65
South Sudan	66

5th place bracket

5th–8th place semifinals
1 August
Ivory Coast	68
Cameroon	83
1 August
Mozambique	76
Uganda	58

Fifth place game
2 August
Cameroon	60
Mozambique	40
Seventh place game
2 August
Ivory Coast	78
Uganda	71

=== Qualification to Quarterfinals ===
30 July 2025
12:00

Boxscore

Mozambique	91–38	Guinea
Scoring by quarter: 27–9, 23–11, 28–10, 13–8
Pts: Dongue 17; Rebs: Dongue 9 Asts: Zita 5		Pts: Kaba 11; Rebs: Camara 8 Asts: three players 4

Palais des Sports de Treichville, Abidjan
Referees: Nadege Zouzou (CIV), Erick Otieno (KEN), Didier Gaga (RWA)

30 July 2025
15:00

Boxscore

Egypt	65–75	South Sudan
Scoring by quarter: 26–10, 18–20, 12–24, 9–21
Pts: El-Gedawy 25; Rebs: El-Gedawy 6 Asts: El-Shabrawy 6		Pts: Gakdeng 19; Rebs: Gakdeng 24; Asts: Washington 6

Palais des Sports de Treichville, Abidjan
Attendance: 1,000
Referees: Ariadna Chueca (ESP), Fanta Touré (MLI), Silver Houngbedji (BEN)

30 July 2025
18:00

Boxscore

Senegal	80–37	Rwanda
Scoring by quarter: 20–6, 20–11, 24–6, 16–11
Pts: Ndiaye 12; Rebs: Faye 9 Asts: Dillard 4		Pts: Hampton 11; Rebs: Hampton 8 Asts: Philoxy 4

Palais des Sports de Treichville, Abidjan
Referees: Julirys Guzmán (PUR), Sarty Nghixulifwa (NAM), Dorothy Okatch (BOT)

30 July 2025
21:00

Boxscore

Cameroon	85–64	Angola
Scoring by quarter: 27–20, 17–12, 24–16, 17–16
Pts: Thomas 19; Rebs: Silatsa 6 Asts: Belleka 8		Pts: Caetano 19; Rebs: Caetano 7 Asts: Lucas 7

Palais des Sports de Treichville, Abidjan
Referees: Mihkel Männiste (EST), Adlen Larouci (ALG), Walelign Gebeto (ETH)

=== Quarterfinals ===
31 July 2025
12:00

Boxscore

Uganda	68–69	South Sudan
Scoring by quarter: 25–20, 15–26, 20–13, 8–10
Pts: Nyamwenge 16; Rebs: Asinde 11; Asts: Asinde, Robinson 6		Pts: Washington 17; Rebs: Gakdeng 13; Asts: Washington 6

Palais des Sports de Treichville, Abidjan
Referees: Sarty Nghixulifwa (NAM), Dorothy Okatch (BOT), Imene Tahmi (ALG)

31 July 2025
15:00

Boxscore

Mali	86–68	Mozambique
Scoring by quarter: 23–11, 28–25, 15–18, 20–14
Pts: N'Diaye 18; Rebs: Dabou 12; Asts: Doumbia 8		Pts: S. Chiziane 17; Rebs: S. Chiziane, Dongue 5 Asts: Pinto, Zita 4

Palais des Sports de Treichville, Abidjan
Referees: Ariadna Chueca (ESP), Silver Houngbedji (BEN), Adlen Larouci (ALG)

31 July 2025
18:00

Boxscore

Ivory Coast	60–66	Senegal
Scoring by quarter: 19–11, 17–16, 7–15, 17–24
Pts: Diaby 14; Rebs: Diaby 12; Asts: Sahie 4		Pts: Dillard 16; Rebs: Y. Diop 8 Asts: Dillard, Y. Diop 4

Palais des Sports de Treichville, Abidjan
Referees: Mihkel Männiste (EST), Didier Gaga (RWA), Walelign Gebeto (ETH)

31 July 2025
21:00

Boxscore

Nigeria	83–47	Cameroon
Scoring by quarter: 21–9, 20–20, 25–2, 17–16
Pts: Okonkwo 18; Rebs: Musa, Okonkwo 6 Asts: Kalu 6		Pts: Thomas 11; Rebs: Thomas 8 Asts: Belleka, Thomas 4

Palais des Sports de Treichville, Abidjan
Referees: Julirys Guzmán (PUR), Youssouf Maïga (MLI), Fanta Touré (MLI)

=== 5th–8th place semifinals ===
1 August 2025
12:00

Boxscore

Mozambique	76–58	Uganda
Scoring by quarter: 21–14, 22–17, 18–18, 15–9
Pts: S. Chiziane 16; Rebs: Chiziane 9 Asts: Mucauro, Pinto 4		Pts: Akello 18; Rebs: Akullu 9 Asts: Nyamwenge, Robinson 5

Palais des Sports de Treichville, Abidjan
Referees: Fanta Touré (MLI), Adlen Larouci (ALG), Silver Houngbedji (BEN)

1 August 2025
15:00

Boxscore

Ivory Coast	68–83	Cameroon
Scoring by quarter: 14–23, 11–32, 18–15, 25–13
Pts: Alston 19; Rebs: Dosso 4 Asts: Alston 6		Pts: Thomas 24; Rebs: Fankam 10; Asts: Belleka 6

Palais des Sports de Treichville, Abidjan
Referees: Dorothy Okatch (BOT), Sarty Nghixulifwa (NAM), Aya Ahmed (EGY)

=== Semifinals ===
2 August 2025
18:00

Boxscore

Senegal	68–75	Nigeria
Scoring by quarter: 17–22, 20–21, 21–9, 10–23
Pts: Dillard 26; Rebs: Dillard 7 Asts: Kané 6		Pts: Kalu 19; Rebs: Kunaiyi-Akpannah 7 Asts: three players 3

Palais des Sports de Treichville, Abidjan
Referees: Ariadna Chueca (ESP), Nadege Zouzou (CIV), Aya Ahmed (EGY)

2 August 2025
21:00

Boxscore

Mali	76–50	South Sudan
Scoring by quarter: 29–8, 21–11, 20–17, 6–14
Pts: Thienou 14; Rebs: Sangaré 8 Asts: Sissoko 5		Pts: Washington 21; Rebs: Macuei 8 Asts: Washington 2

Palais des Sports de Treichville, Abidjan
Referees: Guy Sani (CMR), Julirys Guzmán (PUR), Adlen Larouci (ALG)

=== Seventh place game ===
2 August 2025
12:00

Boxscore

Ivory Coast	78–71	Uganda
Scoring by quarter: 22–19, 25–5, 18–27, 13–20
Pts: Diakite 15; Rebs: Diakite 7 Asts: Kaiser 6		Pts: Asinde 24; Rebs: Akullu 12; Asts: three players 3

Palais des Sports de Treichville, Abidjan
Referees: Youssouf Maïga (MLI), David Domingos (ANG), Arbia Belghith (TUN)

=== Fifth place game ===
2 August 2025
15:00

Boxscore

Cameroon	60–40	Mozambique
Scoring by quarter: 19–8, 18–11, 19–12, 4–9
Pts: Thomas 19; Rebs: Fankam 13; Asts: Thomas 4		Pts: Dongue 12; Rebs: Dongue 7 Asts: Verloso 4

Palais des Sports de Treichville, Abidjan
Referees: Mihkel Männiste (EST), Fanta Touré (MLI), Erick Otieno (KEN)

=== Third place game ===
3 August 2025
14:30

Boxscore

Senegal	65–66	South Sudan
Scoring by quarter: 10–26, 18–9, 20–15, 17–16
Pts: N. Ndiaye, Dillard 16; Rebs: Faye 5 Asts: Thiaw 4		Pts: Washington 22; Rebs: Bulgak, Gakdeng 13; Asts: Washington 8

Palais des Sports de Treichville, Abidjan
Referees: Dorothy Okatch (BOT), Ariadna Chueca (ESP), Imene Tahmi (ALG)

=== Final ===
3 August 2025
18:00

Boxscore

Nigeria	78–64	Mali
Scoring by quarter: 21–26, 20–15, 20–15, 17–8
Pts: Kalu 20; Rebs: Musa 12; Asts: Amukamara 11		Pts: Koné 16; Rebs: Koné 13; Asts: three players 3

Palais des Sports de Treichville, Abidjan
Referees: Julirys Guzmán (PUR), Nadege Zouzou (CIV), Aya Ahmed (EGY)

== Final standings ==
Rank	Team	Record
1st place, gold medalist(s)	Nigeria	5–0
2nd place, silver medalist(s)	Mali	4–1
3rd place, bronze medalist(s)	South Sudan	3–3
4	Senegal	3–3
5	Cameroon	4–2
6	Mozambique	3–2
7	Ivory Coast	3–2
8	Uganda	2–3
9	Egypt	1–2
10	Angola	0–3
11	Rwanda	0–3
12	Guinea	0–3

Qualified for the 2026 FIBA Women's Basketball World Cup
Qualified for the 2026 FIBA Women's Basketball World Cup Qualifying Tournaments

== Statistics and awards ==
=== Statistical leaders ===
==== Players ====
Points

Name	PPG
(Egypt) Raneem El-Gedawy	20.3
(South Sudan) Delicia Washington	18.2
(Cameroon) Jessica Thomas	17.5
(Angola) Sara Caetano	17.0
(Guinea) Masseny Kaba	16.0

Rebounds

Name	RPG
(South Sudan) Maria Gakdeng	11.7
(Mali) Sika Koné	11.0
(Egypt) Raneem El-Gedawy	10.0
(Uganda) Jane Asinde	8.8
(Cameroon) Dulcy Fankam	8.7

Assists

Name	APG
(South Sudan) Delicia Washington	5.3
(Uganda) Jane Asinde	5.2
(Nigeria) Promise Amukamara	5.0
(Ivory Coast) Molly Kaiser	4.6
(Cameroon) Jessica Thomas	4.5

Blocks

Name	BPG
(South Sudan) Maria Gakdeng	2.7
(Ivory Coast) Laetitia Sahie	1.8
(Nigeria) Victoria Macaulay	1.6
(Senegal) Ndioma Kané	1.3
(Guinea) Aicha Mara	1.3
(Rwanda) Keisha Hampton	1.3

Steals

Name	SPG
(Egypt) Raneem El-Ggedawy	4.0
(Senegal) Cierra Dillard	3.0
(Nigeria) Ezinne Kalu	2.8
(Mozambique) Ingvild Mucauro	2.8
(Senegal) Ndioma Kané	2.7
(Mozambique) Silvia Veloso	2.7

Efficiency

Name	EFFPG
(South Sudan) Maria Gakdeng	18.3
(Egypt) Raneem El-Gedawy	17.7
(Uganda) Jane Asinde	17.6
(Senegal) Cierra Dillard	16.8
(Cameroon) Dulcy Fankam	16.7

==== Teams ====
Points

Team	PPG
Nigeria	77.6
Senegal	73.5
Ivory Coast	72.6
Uganda	71.6
Mali	71.2

Rebounds

Team	RPG
South Sudan	47.8
Uganda	46.4
Mali	46.2
Mozambique	43.3
Senegal	42.0

Assists

Team	APG
Mali	20.8
Uganda	19.2
Nigeria	18.8
Cameroon	17.7
Ivory Coast	17.0

Blocks

Team	BPG
Nigeria	4.2
Ivory Coast	4.0
South Sudan	3.8
Uganda	3.6
Rwanda	3.3

Steals

Team	SPG
Senegal	15.5
Mozambique	13.3
Nigeria	12.8
Uganda	12.4
Egypt	11.0

Efficiency

Team	EFFPG
Nigeria	94.8
Mali	84.0
Senegal	79.2
Uganda	76.4
Ivory Coast	75.2

=== Awards ===
The awards were announced on 3 August 2025.

All-Tournament Team
Guards	Forwards
(Senegal) Cierra Dillard (South Sudan) Delicia Washington	(Nigeria) Amy Okonkwo (Uganda) Jane Asinde (Mali) Sika Koné
MVP: (Nigeria) Amy Okonkwo
