= 2026 FIBA Women's Basketball World Cup Qualifying Tournaments =

Tournament details
- Host country: China; France; Puerto Rico; Turkey
- Dates: 11–17 March
- Teams: 24 (from 5 federations)
- Venues: 4 (in 4 host cities)

The 2026 FIBA Women's Basketball World Cup Qualifying Tournaments determined the last eleven teams for the 2026 FIBA Women's Basketball World Cup. The tournaments were held from 11 to 17 March 2026.

== Format ==
The 24 teams, final tournament hosts Germany and 23 teams coming from the continental championships in 2025, were divided into four tournaments of six teams each, playing each other once in a single round-robin. Germany and the continental champions, all automatically qualified for the final tournament, still participated in the qualifying tournaments. With one continental champion in each tournament, three spots were contested in three tournaments, and two in the tournament containing Germany.

== Qualified teams ==
| Qualification | Hosts | Dates | Vacancies | Qualified |
|---|---|---|---|---|
| 2026 FIBA Women's Basketball World Cup hosts | —N/a | 28 April 2023 | 1 | Germany |
| 2026 FIBA Women's Basketball World Cup Pre-Qualifying Tournaments | Mexico City | 19–25 August 2024 | 1 | Czechia |
| 2026 FIBA Women's Basketball World Cup Pre-Qualifying Tournaments | (Rwanda) Kigali | 19–25 August 2024 | 1 | Hungary |
| EuroBasket Women 2025 | (Czech Republic) Brno (Germany) Hamburg (Greece) Piraeus (Italy) Bologna | 18–29 June 2025 | 5 | Belgium; Spain; Italy; France; Turkey |
| 2025 FIBA Women's AmeriCup | (Chile) Santiago | 28 June – 6 July 2025 | 6 | United States; Brazil; Canada; Argentina; Colombia; Puerto Rico |
| 2025 FIBA Women's Asia Cup | (China) Shenzhen | 13–20 July 2025 | 6 | Australia; Japan; China; South Korea; New Zealand; Philippines |
| 2025 FIBA Women's AfroBasket | (Ivory Coast) Abidjan | 26 July – 3 August 2025 | 4 | Nigeria; Mali; South Sudan; Senegal |
| Total | | | 24 | |

== Host selection ==
On 19 September 2025, FIBA announced the tournaments would be hosted by Istanbul, Turkey; Villeurbanne, France; San Juan, Puerto Rico; and Wuhan, China.

=== Overview of venues ===
- The Wuhan Sports Center Gymnasium in Wuhan hosted Group A. The facility previously organised the 2014 FIBA Asia Cup, 2015 FIBA Asia Championship for Women and was one of the host cities for the 2019 FIBA Basketball World Cup.
- The José Miguel Agrelot Coliseum in San Juan will host Group B. The venue has hosted the 2019 FIBA Women's AmeriCup and one of the 2024 FIBA Men's Olympic Qualifying Tournaments It is the biggest arena in the Caribbean.
- The Basketball Development Center was Istanbul's venue for Group C. Built in 2024 and owned by the Turkish Basketball Federation, the venue hosted the 2024 FIBA Under-17 Basketball World Cup and 2024 FIBA Europe SuperCup Women. Galatasaray S.K. and Anadolu Efes play their games here.
- Group D took place at the Astroballe in Villeurbanne. Housing 5,500 seats, the arena hosted the 2023 FIBA Europe SuperCup Women and is the home venue for ASVEL Basket.

| (Puerto Rico) San Juan | 2026 FIBA Women's Basketball World Cup Qualifying Tournaments (Earth) | Wuhan |
|---|---|---|
| José Miguel Agrelot Coliseum | 2026 FIBA Women's Basketball World Cup Qualifying Tournaments (Earth) | Wuhan Sports Center Gymnasium |
| Capacity: 17,024 | 2026 FIBA Women's Basketball World Cup Qualifying Tournaments (Earth) | Capacity: 14,300 |
| (Turkey) Istanbul | 2026 FIBA Women's Basketball World Cup Qualifying Tournaments (Earth) | (France) Villeurbanne |
| Basketball Development Center | 2026 FIBA Women's Basketball World Cup Qualifying Tournaments (Earth) | Astroballe |
| Capacity: 10,000 | 2026 FIBA Women's Basketball World Cup Qualifying Tournaments (Earth) | Capacity: 5,500 |

== Draw ==
The draw was held on 7 October 2025, at the FIBA headquarters in Mies, Switzerland, conducted by German player Marie Gülich and French former player Endéné Miyem. The draw started with the four hosts being placed into their respective groups and continued with, in order, pots 1, 2, 3, 4, 5 and 6 being drawn, with each team selected then allocated into the first available group alphabetically. The position for the team within the group would then be drawn (for the purpose of the schedule). Countries in bold text means they qualified.

=== Seeding ===
The seeding and principles were announced on 6 October 2025. The seeding was based on the 8 August 2025 FIBA Women's World Ranking.

In order to preserve geographic balance, the following restrictions applied in the draw:

- Each of the four continental champions, who were already directly qualified for the World Cup, were drawn into one tournament.
- A maximum of two European teams were drawn in each tournament, including World Cup hosts Germany.
- One or two teams from the Americas and from Asia and Oceania were drawn in each tournament.
- One of the four tournaments was drawn with two teams from Africa (excluding continental champions Nigeria), with two other tournaments drawing one African team each.
- South Sudan could not be drawn in the Puerto Rico tournament.

Pot 1
| Team | Pos |
|---|---|
| **United States** | 1 |
| **Australia** | 2 |
| **France** **(H)** | 3 |
| **China** **(H)** | 4 |

Pot 2
| Team | Pos |
|---|---|
| **Belgium** | 5 |
| **Spain** | 6 |
| Canada | 7 |
| **Nigeria** | 8 |

Pot 3
| Team | Pos |
|---|---|
| Brazil | 9 |
| **Japan** | 11 |
| **Germany** | 12 |
| **Puerto Rico** **(H)** | 13 |

Pot 4
| Team | Pos |
|---|---|
| **Italy** | 14 |
| **South Korea** | 15 |
| **Turkey** **(H)** | 16 |
| **Czechia** | 17 |

Pot 5
| Team | Pos |
|---|---|
| **Mali** | 18 |
| Colombia | 19 |
| **Hungary** | 20 |
| New Zealand | 21 |

Pot 6
| Team | Pos |
|---|---|
| Senegal | 25 |
| Argentina | 27 |
| Philippines | 39 |
| South Sudan | 55 |

=== Draw results ===
Tournament A
| Pos | Team |
|---|---|
| A1 | Mali |
| A2 | South Sudan |
| A3 | Brazil |
| A4 | Belgium |
| A5 | Czechia |
| A6 | China **(H)** |

Tournament B
| Pos | Team |
|---|---|
| B1 | New Zealand |
| B2 | Puerto Rico **(H)** |
| B3 | United States |
| B4 | Senegal |
| B5 | Italy |
| B6 | Spain |

Tournament C
| Pos | Team |
|---|---|
| C1 | Hungary |
| C2 | Turkey **(H)** |
| C3 | Argentina |
| C4 | Australia |
| C5 | Canada |
| C6 | Japan |

Tournament D
| Pos | Team |
|---|---|
| D1 | Colombia |
| D2 | Philippines |
| D3 | Germany |
| D4 | South Korea |
| D5 | France **(H)** |
| D6 | Nigeria |

== Tournaments ==
Tie-breaking criteria
The ranking of teams in each group is determined by their points total. If two or more teams are equal on points, the following criteria are used to determine the ranking:
1. Most points obtained in the games played between the teams concerned;
2. Higher game points difference in the games played between the teams concerned;
3. Higher number of game points scored in the games played between the teams concerned;
4. Higher game points difference in all games played in the group;
5. Higher number of game points scored in all games played in the group;

If at any level of these criteria one or more teams are already classified, the procedure shall be repeated from the start for all the remaining teams not classified.

The schedule was confirmed on 8 October 2025.

=== Tournament A ===
The tournament was held in Wuhan, China.

All times are local (UTC+8).

| Pos | Team | Pld | W | L | PF | PA | PD | Pts | Qualification |
|---|---|---|---|---|---|---|---|---|---|
| 1 | Belgium (Note: Belgium automatically qualified as EuroBasket Women 2025 champions.) | 5 | 5 | 0 | 455 | 299 | +156 | 10 | Final tournament |
| 2 | China (H) | 5 | 4 | 1 | 399 | 369 | +30 | 9 | Final tournament |
| 3 | Mali | 5 | 2 | 3 | 365 | 376 | −11 | 7 (Note: Head-to-head points: Mali 3, Czechia 3, Brazil 3; head-to-head point difference: Mali +10, Czechia +6, Brazil –16.) | Final tournament |
| 4 | Czechia | 5 | 2 | 3 | 361 | 371 | −10 | 7 | Final tournament |
| 5 | Brazil | 5 | 2 | 3 | 376 | 418 | −42 | 7 | |
| 6 | South Sudan | 5 | 0 | 5 | 345 | 468 | −123 | 5 | |

Source: FIBA
Rules for classification: Tiebreakers
(H) Hosts
Notes:

11 March 2026
13:30

Report

| Czechia | 89–52 | South Sudan |
Scoring by quarter: 20–15, 22–13, 31–16, 16–8
| Pts: Stoupalová 16; Rebs: Pospisilova 8 Asts: Pospisilova 7 | | Pts: Gakdeng 21; Rebs: Bulgak 12; Asts: Deng 4 |

Wuhan Sports Center Gymnasium, Wuhan
Attendance: 500
Referees: Ventsislav Velikov (BUL), Carlos Vélez (COL), Lee Kyoung-hwan (KOR)

11 March 2026
16:30

Report

| Brazil | 70–99 | Belgium |
Scoring by quarter: 12–23, 22–35, 21–23, 15–18
| Pts: Nascimento 16; Rebs: Dantas, Gonçalves 6 Asts: Costa 5 | | Pts: Linskens 17; Rebs: Ramette 6 Asts: Ramette 6 |

Wuhan Sports Center Gymnasium, Wuhan
Attendance: 2,000
Referees: Ruben Woolcock (AUS), Silvia Marziali (ITA), Edgard Ceccarelli (FRA)

11 March 2026
19:30

Report

| China | 81–68 | Mali |
Scoring by quarter: 20–20, 15–9, 22–19, 24–20
| Pts: Li 21; Rebs: Li 10; Asts: Yang 7 | | Pts: Dabou 15; Rebs: Haidara 9 Asts: Haidara 5 |

Wuhan Sports Center Gymnasium, Wuhan
Attendance: 4,932
Referees: Wojciech Liszka (POL), Elvis Binders-Čoders (LAT), Nataša Dragojević (MNE)

12 March 2026
13:30

Report

| South Sudan | 79–94 | Brazil |
Scoring by quarter: 16–22, 20–20, 18–24, 25–28
| Pts: Diew 19; Rebs: Bulgak, Deng 10; Asts: Deng 5 | | Pts: Dantas 25; Rebs: Cardoso 17; Asts: Oliveira 7 |

Wuhan Sports Center Gymnasium, Wuhan
Attendance: 538
Referees: Ruben Woolcock (AUS), Ivana Ivanović (SRB), Elvis Binders-Čoders (LAT)

12 March 2026
16:30

Report

| Mali | 77–64 | Czechia |
Scoring by quarter: 22–17, 27–12, 17–17, 11–18
| Pts: Haidara 24; Rebs: Koné 13; Asts: Doumbia 5 | | Pts: Holešínská 15; Rebs: Čechová, Holešínská 5 Asts: three players 3 |

Wuhan Sports Center Gymnasium, Wuhan
Attendance: 689
Referees: Ventsislav Velikov (BUL), Nataša Dragojević (MNE), Martin Davison (NZL)

12 March 2026
19:30

Report

| Belgium | 80–65 | China |
Scoring by quarter: 21–11, 21–17, 19–17, 19–20
| Pts: Delaere 27; Rebs: Allemand 8 Asts: three players 7 | | Pts: Zhang Z. 20; Rebs: Zhang Z. 11; Asts: Zhang M., Wang 5 |

Wuhan Sports Center Gymnasium, Wuhan
Attendance: 7,121
Referees: Wojciech Liszka (POL), Carlos Vélez (COL), Edgard Ceccarelli (FRA)

14 March 2026
13:30

Report

| Brazil | 65–84 | Czechia |
Scoring by quarter: 20–24, 26–18, 7–22, 12–20
| Pts: Dantas 30; Rebs: Dantas 12; Asts: Costa 5 | | Pts: Šotolová 17; Rebs: Hamzová 7 Asts: Hamzová 6 |

Wuhan Sports Center Gymnasium, Wuhan
Attendance: 538
Referees: Wojciech Liszka (POL), Martin Davison (NZL), Edgard Ceccarelli (FRA)

14 March 2026
16:30

Report

| Belgium | 81–50 | Mali |
Scoring by quarter: 26–17, 14–14, 24–12, 17–7
| Pts: Linskens 15; Rebs: Linskens 10; Asts: Meesseman 6 | | Pts: Koné, N'Diaye 10; Rebs: Koné 5 Asts: Doumbia 3 |

Wuhan Sports Center Gymnasium, Wuhan
Attendance: 634
Referees: Ruben Woolcock (AUS), Nataša Dragojević (MNE), Lee Kyoung-hwan (KOR)

14 March 2026
19:30

Report

| China | 86–76 | South Sudan |
Scoring by quarter: 22–15, 24–21, 24–15, 16–25
| Pts: Wang 17; Rebs: Han 8 Asts: Zhang 6 | | Pts: Bulgak 18; Rebs: Leime 7 Asts: Diew 4 |

Wuhan Sports Center Gymnasium, Wuhan
Attendance: 8,566
Referees: Ventsislav Velikov (BUL), Carlos Vélez (COL), Silvia Marziali (ITA)

15 March 2026
13:30

Report

| Mali | 73–76 | Brazil |
Scoring by quarter: 15–20, 22–15, 25–13, 11–28
| Pts: Koné 20; Rebs: Koné 12; Asts: Doumbia 6 | | Pts: Cardoso 17; Rebs: Dantas 12; Asts: Gonçalo 10 |

Wuhan Sports Center Gymnasium, Wuhan
Attendance: 100
Referees: Wojciech Liszka (POL), Nataša Dragojević (MNE), Elvis Binders-Čoders (LAT)

15 March 2026
16:30

Report

| South Sudan | 64–102 | Belgium |
Scoring by quarter: 16–21, 12–32, 11–33, 25–16
| Pts: Diew 20; Rebs: Macuei 7 Asts: Deng 3 | | Pts: Lisowa-Mbaka 18; Rebs: Lisowa-Mbaka 8 Asts: Lisowa-Mbaka 9 |

Wuhan Sports Center Gymnasium, Wuhan
Attendance: 483
Referees: Carlos Vélez (COL), Ivana Ivanović (SRB), Edgard Ceccarelli (FRA)

15 March 2026
19:30

Report

| Czechia | 74–84 | China |
Scoring by quarter: 12–17, 18–20, 23–22, 21–25
| Pts: Čechová 23; Rebs: Čechová 13; Asts: three players 4 | | Pts: Wang 14; Rebs: Chen M. 6 Asts: Yang 6 |

Wuhan Sports Center Gymnasium, Wuhan
Attendance: 8,568
Referees: Ruben Woolcock (AUS), Martin Davison (NZL), Silvia Marziali (ITA)

17 March 2026
13:30

Report

| South Sudan | 74–91 | Mali |
Scoring by quarter: 19–23, 17–19, 14–21, 24–34
| Pts: Leime 21; Rebs: Bulgak, Macuei 9 Asts: Deng 5 | | Pts: Dembélé 20; Rebs: Koné 7 Asts: three players 6 |

Wuhan Sports Center Gymnasium, Wuhan
Attendance: 257
Referees: Carlos Vélez (COL), Ivana Ivanović (SRB), Elvis Binders-Čoders (LAT)

17 March 2026
16:30

Report

| Belgium | 93–50 | Czechia |
Scoring by quarter: 18–17, 27–15, 26–9, 22–9
| Pts: Linskens 22; Rebs: Meesseman, Linskens 9 Asts: Meesseman, Vanloo 9 | | Pts: Voráčková 13; Rebs: Voráčková, Čechová 6 Asts: Voráčková 4 |

Wuhan Sports Center Gymnasium, Wuhan
Attendance: 488
Referees: Wojciech Liszka (POL), Ventsislav Velikov (BUL), Martin Davison (NZL)

17 March 2026
19:30

Report

| China | 83–71 | Brazil |
Scoring by quarter: 21–17, 25–25, 23–12, 14–17
| Pts: Han 22; Rebs: Han 8 Asts: Zhang M., Yang 7 | | Pts: Dantas 26; Rebs: Cardoso 11; Asts: Gonçalo 7 |

Wuhan Sports Center Gymnasium, Wuhan
Attendance: 8,355
Referees: Ruben Woolcock (AUS), Nataša Dragojević (MNE), Edgard Ceccarelli (FRA)

=== Tournament B ===
The tournament was held in San Juan, Puerto Rico.

All times are local (UTC−4).

| Pos | Team | Pld | W | L | PF | PA | PD | Pts | Qualification |
|---|---|---|---|---|---|---|---|---|---|
| 1 | United States (Note: The United States automatically qualified as 2025 FIBA Women's AmeriCup champions.) | 5 | 5 | 0 | 479 | 269 | +210 | 10 | Final tournament |
| 2 | Italy | 5 | 4 | 1 | 364 | 276 | +88 | 9 | Final tournament |
| 3 | Spain | 5 | 3 | 2 | 400 | 305 | +95 | 8 | Final tournament |
| 4 | Puerto Rico (H) | 5 | 2 | 3 | 274 | 368 | −94 | 7 | Final tournament |
| 5 | Senegal | 5 | 1 | 4 | 240 | 380 | −140 | 6 | |
| 6 | New Zealand | 5 | 0 | 5 | 253 | 412 | −159 | 5 | |

Source: FIBA
Rules for classification: Tiebreakers
(H) Hosts
Notes:

11 March 2026
14:00

Report

| Spain | 99–50 | New Zealand |
Scoring by quarter: 22–9, 25–13, 30–14, 22–14
| Pts: Gustafson 20; Rebs: Gustafson 6 Asts: three players 4 | | Pts: Tofaeono 14; Rebs: Pizzey, Tofaeono 7 Asts: Shearer 3 |

José Miguel Agrelot Coliseum, San Juan
Attendance: 32
Referees: Boris Krejić (SLO), Aline García (URU), Yann Davidson (MAD)

11 March 2026
17:00

Report

| United States | 110–46 | Senegal |
Scoring by quarter: 28–11, 31–8, 23–17, 28–10
| Pts: Howard 21; Rebs: Reese 8 Asts: Clark 12 | | Pts: N. Ndiaye 12; Rebs: Ndiaye, Y. Diop 6 Asts: Pouye 3 |

José Miguel Agrelot Coliseum, San Juan
Attendance: 1,041
Referees: James Griguol (AUS), Viola Györgyi (NOR), Kevin Lei (CAN)

11 March 2026
20:00

Report

| Italy | 78–41 | Puerto Rico |
Scoring by quarter: 28–14, 17–10, 16–9, 17–8
| Pts: Verona 16; Rebs: Cubaj 8 Asts: Cubaj 5 | | Pts: Gonzalez, Benitez 8 Rebs: McGee-Stafford 7 Asts: San Antonio 3 |

José Miguel Agrelot Coliseum, San Juan
Attendance: 1,500
Referees: Alan dos Santos (BRA), Çisil Güngör (TUR), Sun Jian (CHN)

12 March 2026
14:00

Report

| Senegal | 51–84 | Spain |
Scoring by quarter: 13–25, 8–17, 13–30, 17–12
| Pts: Kané 12; Rebs: Faye 10; Asts: Kané, N. Ndiaye 3 | | Pts: Martín 16; Rebs: Gustafson 10; Asts: Cazorla 8 |

José Miguel Agrelot Coliseum, San Juan
Attendance: 36
Referees: Mihkel Männiste (EST), Yann Davidson (MAD), Alan dos Santos (BRA)

12 March 2026
17:00

Report

| New Zealand | 51–74 | Italy |
Scoring by quarter: 12–26, 18–12, 14–21, 7–15
| Pts: Graham 9 Rebs: Shearer, Robati 6 Asts: Dalton 3 | | Pts: Zandalasini 18; Rebs: Verona 7 Asts: Verona 6 |

José Miguel Agrelot Coliseum, San Juan
Attendance: 1,680
Referees: James Griguol (AUS), Viola Györgyi (NOR), Çisil Güngör (TUR)

12 March 2026
20:00

Report

| Puerto Rico | 48–91 | United States |
Scoring by quarter: 7–24, 12–22, 14–20, 15–25
| Pts: McGee-Stafford 14; Rebs: McGee-Stafford 7 Asts: Gonzalez, San Antonio 3 | | Pts: Bueckers 16; Rebs: Reese 13; Asts: Gray 4 |

José Miguel Agrelot Coliseum, San Juan
Attendance: 5,568
Referees: Boris Krejić (SLO), Aline García (URU), Ritvars Helmšteins (LAT)

14 March 2026
14:00

Report

| Senegal | 61–45 | New Zealand |
Scoring by quarter: 14–10, 15–14, 23–9, 9–12
| Pts: Y. Diop 13; Rebs: S. Ndiaye 10; Asts: Gueye, Kané 4 | | Pts: Tofaeono 10; Rebs: Shearer 7 Asts: Graham 4 |

José Miguel Agrelot Coliseum, San Juan
Attendance: 131
Referees: Boris Krejić (SLO), Çisil Güngör (TUR), Sun Jian (CHN)

14 March 2026
17:00

Report

| United States | 93–59 | Italy |
Scoring by quarter: 28–11, 22–19, 19–15, 24–14
| Pts: Copper 15; Rebs: Hamby 9 Asts: Gray 8 | | Pts: three players 9 Rebs: Cubaj 7 Asts: Verona, Zandalasini 4 |

José Miguel Agrelot Coliseum, San Juan
Attendance: 2,615
Referees: Alan dos Santos (BRA), Mihkel Männiste (EST), Ritvars Helmšteins (LAT)

14 March 2026
20:00

Report

| Spain | 91–52 | Puerto Rico |
Scoring by quarter: 31–17, 22–6, 22–11, 16–18
| Pts: Gustafson 21; Rebs: Martín 7 Asts: Ortiz 6 | | Pts: San Antonio 11; Rebs: Satterfield 8 Asts: four players 2 |

José Miguel Agrelot Coliseum, San Juan
Attendance: 3,743
Referees: Viola Györgyi (NOR), Yann Davidson (MAD), Kevin Lei (CAN)

15 March 2026
14:00

Report

| New Zealand | 46–101 | United States |
Scoring by quarter: 12–27, 6–27, 21–24, 7–23
| Pts: Robati 11; Rebs: Robati, Pizzey 6 Asts: Dalton 4 | | Pts: Howard 18; Rebs: Iriafen 8 Asts: Clark 6 |

José Miguel Agrelot Coliseum, San Juan
Attendance: 754
Referees: Viola Györgyi (NOR), Yann Davidson (MAD), Kevin Lei (CAN)

15 March 2026
17:00

Report

| Italy | 68–56 | Spain |
Scoring by quarter: 15–13, 13–13, 19–17, 21–13
| Pts: Zandalasini 22; Rebs: Cubaj 8 Asts: Santucci 6 | | Pts: Gustafson 12; Rebs: Buenavida, Gustafson 6 Asts: Conde, Martín 4 |

José Miguel Agrelot Coliseum, San Juan
Attendance: 393
Referees: James Griguol (AUS), Aline García (URU), Sun Jian (CHN)

15 March 2026
20:00

Report

| Puerto Rico | 56–47 | Senegal |
Scoring by quarter: 17–5, 9–17, 16–10, 14–15
| Pts: Rosado, Guirantes 11; Rebs: McGee-Stafford 10; Asts: Guirantes 3 | | Pts: Faye 14; Rebs: Faye 12; Asts: Guèye 4 |

José Miguel Agrelot Coliseum, San Juan
Attendance: 985
Referees: Mihkel Männiste (EST), Alan dos Santos (BRA), Ritvars Helmšteins (LAT)

17 March 2026
14:00

Report

| Senegal | 35–85 | Italy |
Scoring by quarter: 7–26, 13–18, 4–25, 11–16
| Pts: N. Ndiaye, Timera 7 Rebs: Fall 9 Asts: Thiaw 3 | | Pts: Santucci 16; Rebs: Keys 6 Asts: three players 3 |

José Miguel Agrelot Coliseum, San Juan
Attendance: 104
Referees: Mihkel Männiste (EST), Çisil Güngör (TUR), Jian Sun (CHN)

17 March 2026
17:00

Report

| Spain | 70–84 | United States |
Scoring by quarter: 16–21, 16–23, 15–17, 23–23
| Pts: Carrera 15; Rebs: Fam 5 Asts: Martín 6 | | Pts: Copper 20; Rebs: Reese 8 Asts: Clark 7 |

José Miguel Agrelot Coliseum, San Juan
Attendance: 1,827
Referees: James Griguol (AUS), Ritvars Helmšteins (LAT), Yann Davidson (MAD)

17 March 2026
20:00

Report

| Puerto Rico | 77–61 | New Zealand |
Scoring by quarter: 12–21, 28–17, 20–16, 17–7
| Pts: Rosado 18; Rebs: McGee-Stafford 9 Asts: Guirantes 4 | | Pts: Tofaeono 17; Rebs: Robati 10; Asts: Robati 4 |

José Miguel Agrelot Coliseum, San Juan
Attendance: 3,679
Referees: Boris Krejić (SLO), Alan dos Santos (BRA), Aline García (URU)

=== Tournament C ===
The tournament was held in Istanbul, Turkey.

All times are local (UTC+3).

| Pos | Team | Pld | W | L | PF | PA | PD | Pts | Qualification |
|---|---|---|---|---|---|---|---|---|---|
| 1 | Australia (Note: Australia automatically qualified as 2025 FIBA Women's Asia Cup champions.) | 5 | 5 | 0 | 320 | 268 | +52 | 10 | Final tournament |
| 2 | Hungary | 5 | 3 | 2 | 369 | 366 | +3 | 8 | Final tournament |
| 3 | Turkey (H) | 5 | 2 | 3 | 349 | 361 | −12 | 7 (Note: Head-to-head points: Turkey 4, Japan 3, Canada 2.) | Final tournament |
| 4 | Japan | 5 | 2 | 3 | 352 | 334 | +18 | 7 | Final tournament |
| 5 | Canada | 5 | 2 | 3 | 281 | 231 | +50 | 7 | |
| 6 | Argentina | 5 | 1 | 4 | 285 | 396 | −111 | 6 | |

Source: FIBA
Rules for classification: Tiebreakers
(H) Hosts
Notes:

11 March 2026
14:30

Report

| Argentina | 65–91 | Australia |
Scoring by quarter: 21–26, 15–23, 15–17, 14–25
| Pts: Chagas, Mungo 17; Rebs: Gretter 6 Asts: Gretter 6 | | Pts: Borlase 19; Rebs: Magbegor, Smith 7 Asts: Smith 5 |

Basketball Development Center, Istanbul
Attendance: 58
Referees: Petar Pešić (SRB), Orlando Varela (HON), Gao Yijie (CHN)

11 March 2026
17:30

Report

| Japan | 65–77 | Hungary |
Scoring by quarter: 24–20, 7–16, 16–23, 18–18
| Pts: Yamamoto 15; Rebs: Miyazawa 8 Asts: Machida 5 | | Pts: Juhász 35; Rebs: Juhász 9 Asts: Lelik 8 |

Basketball Development Center, Istanbul
Attendance: 95
Referees: Ariadna Chueca (ESP), Yevgeniy Mikheyev (KAZ), Veronika Obertová (SVK)

11 March 2026
20:30

Report

| Canada | 69–71 | Turkey |
Scoring by quarter: 8–21, 16–18, 23–14, 22–18
| Pts: Carleton 24; Rebs: Ejim 8 Asts: Pellington 8 | | Pts: Burke 16; Rebs: Burke 11; Asts: Çakır, Onar 4 |

Basketball Development Center, Istanbul
Attendance: 1,585
Referees: Julio Anaya (PAN), Wissam Zein (SYR), Nicolas Zivieri (BRA)

12 March 2026
14:30

Report

| Australia | 81–71 | Japan |
Scoring by quarter: 25–18, 13–29, 20–20, 23–4
| Pts: Whitcomb 17; Rebs: Smith 9 Asts: Wilson 7 | | Pts: Tanaka 17; Rebs: Machida 6 Asts: Machida 10 |

Basketball Development Center, Istanbul
Attendance: 90
Referees: Ariadna Chueca (ESP), Wissam Zein (SYR), Yijie Gao (CHN)

12 March 2026
17:30

Report

| Hungary | 53–75 | Canada |
Scoring by quarter: 18–24, 12–12, 10–22, 13–17
| Pts: Juhász 13; Rebs: Juhász 9 Asts: Lelik 5 | | Pts: Pellington 16; Rebs: Alexander 12; Asts: Colley 5 |

Basketball Development Center, Istanbul
Attendance: 93
Referees: Julio Anaya (PAN), Orlando Varela (HON), Park Kyoung-jin (KOR)

12 March 2026
20:30

Report

| Turkey | 55–59 | Argentina |
Scoring by quarter: 12–12, 18–12, 20–20, 5–15
| Pts: Burke 14; Rebs: Burke 10; Asts: Uzun 4 | | Pts: Gretter 16; Rebs: Cabrera, Gretter 9 Asts: Gretter 6 |

Basketball Development Center, Istanbul
Attendance: 1,698
Referees: Petar Pešić (SRB), Yevgeniy Mikheyev (KAZ), Larissa Sales (BRA)

14 March 2026
14:30

Report

| Australia | 71–58 | Hungary |
Scoring by quarter: 13–14, 27–19, 17–10, 14–15
| Pts: Magbegor 14; Rebs: Aoukuso 9 Asts: Borlase 3 | | Pts: Takács-Kiss 10; Rebs: Juhász, Takács-Kiss 7 Asts: Aho 3 |

Basketball Development Center, Istanbul
Attendance: 134
Referees: Petar Pešić (SRB), Gao Yijie (CHN), Veronika Obertová (SVK)

14 March 2026
17:30

Report

| Argentina | 41–75 | Canada |
Scoring by quarter: 8–29, 14–16, 7–16, 12–14
| Pts: Mungo 12; Rebs: four players 3 Asts: Gretter 3 | | Pts: Colley 13; Rebs: Edwards 15; Asts: Colley 5 |

Basketball Development Center, Istanbul
Attendance: 166
Referees: Ariadna Chueca (ESP), Yevgeniy Mikheyev (KAZ), Orlando Varela (HON)

14 March 2026
20:30

Report

| Japan | 67–75 | Turkey |
Scoring by quarter: 20–16, 21–19, 13–20, 13–20
| Pts: Yamamoto 18; Rebs: Takada 6 Asts: Machida 5 | | Pts: Burke 25; Rebs: Burke 9 Asts: Çakır 6 |

Basketball Development Center, Istanbul
Attendance: 2,021
Referees: Julio Anaya (PAN), Park Kyoung-jin (KOR), Nicolas Zivieri (BRA)

15 March 2026
14:30

Report

| Hungary | 92–81 (OT) | Argentina |
Scoring by quarter: 13–16, 23–21, 18–20, 23–20, Overtime: 15–4
| Pts: Lelik 24; Rebs: Takács-Kiss 16; Asts: Lelik 7 | | Pts: Gretter 24; Rebs: Mungo 5 Asts: Gretter 7 |

Basketball Development Center, Istanbul
Attendance: 152
Referees: Julio Anaya (PAN), Wissam Zein (SYR), Nicolas Zivieri (BRA)

15 March 2026
17:30

Report

| Canada | 62–66 | Japan |
Scoring by quarter: 21–18, 18–21, 11–15, 12–12
| Pts: Edwards 22; Rebs: Edwards 15; Asts: Carleton 6 | | Pts: Yamamoto 16; Rebs: Miyazawa 6 Asts: Tanaka 5 |

Basketball Development Center, Istanbul
Attendance: 202
Referees: Petar Pešić (SRB), Orlando Varela (HON), Larissa Sales (BRA)

15 March 2026
20:30

Report

| Turkey | 74–77 | Australia |
Scoring by quarter: 24–19, 18–21, 12–18, 20–19
| Pts: Uzun 20; Rebs: Ural 8 Asts: Çakır 6 | | Pts: Smith 18; Rebs: Smith 10; Asts: three players 5 |

Basketball Development Center, Istanbul
Attendance: 2,116
Referees: Ariadna Chueca (ESP), Yevgeniy Mikheyev (KAZ), Veronika Obertová (SVK)

17 March 2026
14:30

Report

| Japan | 83–39 | Argentina |
Scoring by quarter: 23–7, 17–9, 29–11, 14–12
| Pts: Hirashita 17; Rebs: Takada, Hirashita 5 Asts: Yamamoto 7 | | Pts: Burani 7 Rebs: Gentinetta 8 Asts: four players 2 |

Basketball Development Center, Istanbul
Attendance: 65
Referees: Ariadna Chueca (ESP), Yevgeniy Mikheyev (KAZ), Larissa Sales (BRA)

17 March 2026
17:30

Report

| Australia | 82–76 | Canada |
Scoring by quarter: 20–15, 20–24, 26–20, 16–17
| Pts: Whitcomb 23; Rebs: Smith 8 Asts: Whitcomb 5 | | Pts: Alexander 26; Rebs: Alexander 13; Asts: Colley 10 |

Basketball Development Center, Istanbul
Attendance: 158
Referees: Petar Pešić (SRB), Kyoungjin Park (KOR), Yijie Gao (CHN)

17 March 2026
20:30

Report

| Turkey | 74–89 | Hungary |
Scoring by quarter: 25–25, 16–27, 11–14, 22–23
| Pts: Uzun 15; Rebs: Burke 6 Asts: Bayram 4 | | Pts: Juhász 24; Rebs: Juhász 9 Asts: Lelik 8 |

Basketball Development Center, Istanbul
Attendance: 2,251
Referees: Julio Anaya (PAN), Orlando Varela (HON), Nicolas Zivieri (BRA)

=== Tournament D ===
The tournament was held in Villeurbanne, France.

All times are local (UTC+1).

| Pos | Team | Pld | W | L | PF | PA | PD | Pts | Qualification |
|---|---|---|---|---|---|---|---|---|---|
| 1 | France (H) | 5 | 5 | 0 | 470 | 325 | +145 | 10 | Final tournament |
| 2 | Germany (Note: Germany automatically qualified as World Cup hosts.) | 5 | 4 | 1 | 411 | 344 | +67 | 9 | Final tournament |
| 3 | South Korea | 5 | 3 | 2 | 375 | 351 | +24 | 8 | Final tournament |
| 4 | Nigeria (Note: Nigeria automatically qualified as 2025 FIBA Women's AfroBasket champions.) | 5 | 2 | 3 | 390 | 372 | +18 | 7 | Final tournament |
| 5 | Philippines | 5 | 1 | 4 | 378 | 493 | −115 | 6 | |
| 6 | Colombia | 5 | 0 | 5 | 253 | 392 | −139 | 5 | |

Source: FIBA
Rules for classification: Tiebreakers
(H) Hosts
Notes:

11 March 2026
14:00

Report

| Nigeria | 70–37 | Colombia |
Scoring by quarter: 18–12, 16–17, 19–5, 17–3
| Pts: Macaulay 13; Rebs: Enabosi 11; Asts: Enabosi 5 | | Pts: Martínez, Muñoz 6 Rebs: three players 5 Asts: four players 2 |

Astroballe, Villeurbanne
Attendance: 768
Referees: Julirys Guzmán (PUR), Péter Praksch (HUN), Ioannis Agrafiotis (GRE)

11 March 2026
17:00

Report

| Germany | 76–49 | South Korea |
Scoring by quarter: 23–12, 17–8, 11–18, 25–11
| Pts: Bühner 21; Rebs: Sabally 11; Asts: Peterson 10 | | Pts: Kang L. 11; Rebs: Lee H., Park Ji-s. 5 Asts: Heo 6 |

Astroballe, Villeurbanne
Attendance: 1,142
Referees: Waseem Husainy (CAN), Jacquiline Dover (AUS), Arnold Moseya (RSA)

11 March 2026
20:30

Report

| France | 115–66 | Philippines |
Scoring by quarter: 24–9, 29–17, 33–12, 29–28
| Pts: Malonga 21; Rebs: Malonga 9 Asts: Lacan 9 | | Pts: Sugapong 13; Rebs: Bernardino 6 Asts: Berberabe 4 |

Astroballe, Villeurbanne
Attendance: 1,542
Referees: Maripier Malo (CAN), Jean Ruhamiriza (RWA), Paulina Gajdosz (POL)

12 March 2026
14:00

Report

| South Korea | 77–60 | Nigeria |
Scoring by quarter: 20–16, 16–16, 22–19, 19–9
| Pts: Park Ji-h. 22; Rebs: Park Ji-s. 10; Asts: Heo 8 | | Pts: Macaulay 22; Rebs: Macaulay 6 Asts: Kalu 5 |

Astroballe, Villeurbanne
Attendance: 741
Referees: Gatis Saliņš (LAT), Maripier Malo (CAN), Jacquiline Dover (AUS)

12 March 2026
17:00

Report

| Philippines | 80–113 | Germany |
Scoring by quarter: 25–33, 23–33, 21–29, 11–16
| Pts: Sugapong 21; Rebs: Bernardino 8 Asts: Sugapong 4 | | Pts: Bessoir 25; Rebs: Bessoir 13; Asts: Wilke 7 |

Astroballe, Villeurbanne
Attendance: 351
Referees: Julirys Guzmán (PUR), Jean Ruhamiriza (RWA), Paulina Gajdosz (POL)

12 March 2026
20:30

Report

| Colombia | 48–88 | France |
Scoring by quarter: 9–22, 13–21, 14–22, 12–23
| Pts: Muñoz 12; Rebs: Moscarella 5 Asts: López 5 | | Pts: Lacan, Touré 16; Rebs: Badiane 8 Asts: Johannès 5 |

Astroballe, Villeurbanne
Attendance: 1,723
Referees: Waseem Husainy (CAN), Péter Praksch (HUN), Cláudio Eiuba (ANG)

14 March 2026
14:00

Report

| Nigeria | 101–84 | Philippines |
Scoring by quarter: 21–26, 21–25, 34–21, 25–12
| Pts: Macaulay 16; Rebs: Enabosi, Musa 12; Asts: Musa 8 | | Pts: Pastrana, Pontejos 16; Rebs: Dela Rosa 7 Asts: Berberabe 8 |

Astroballe, Villeurbanne
Attendance: 1,078
Referees: Waseem Husainy (CAN), Péter Praksch (HUN), Arnold Moseya (RSA)

14 March 2026
17:00

Report

| South Korea | 82–52 | Colombia |
Scoring by quarter: 25–16, 19–10, 27–4, 11–22
| Pts: Kang L. 21; Rebs: Jin 7 Asts: Heo 6 | | Pts: Moscarella 17; Rebs: Moscarella 6 Asts: Rios 5 |

Astroballe, Villeurbanne
Attendance: 1,318
Referees: Maripier Malo (CAN), Paulina Gajdosz (POL), Ioannis Agrafiotis (GRE)

14 March 2026
20:30

Report

| Germany | 63–85 | France |
Scoring by quarter: 14–29, 21–18, 15–22, 13–16
| Pts: Peterson 13; Rebs: Eichmeyer, Hartmann 5 Asts: Sabally, Wilke 3 | | Pts: Salaün 18; Rebs: Salaün 6 Asts: three players 4 |

Astroballe, Villeurbanne
Attendance: 5,069
Referees: Gatis Saliņš (LAT), Julirys Guzmán (PUR), Cláudio Eiuba (ANG)

15 March 2026
12:30

Report

| Philippines | 74–105 | South Korea |
Scoring by quarter: 17–28, 16–27, 17–25, 24–25
| Pts: Dela Rosa 26; Rebs: Dela Rosa 9 Asts: Dignadice 5 | | Pts: Kang L. 24; Rebs: Park Ji-h., Park Ji-s. 9 Asts: An 6 |

Astroballe, Villeurbanne
Attendance: 778
Referees: Gatis Saliņš (LAT), Cláudio Eiuba (ANG), Ioannis Agrafiotis (GRE)

15 March 2026
15:30

Report

| Colombia | 57–78 | Germany |
Scoring by quarter: 16–23, 15–19, 15–18, 11–18
| Pts: Paz 17; Rebs: Moscarella 5 Asts: Rios 6 | | Pts: Hartmann 17; Rebs: Bessoir 11; Asts: Peterson 5 |

Astroballe, Villeurbanne
Attendance: 883
Referees: Péter Praksch (HUN), Jacquiline Dover (AUS), Arnold Moseya (RSA)

15 March 2026
19:00

Report

| France | 93–86 | Nigeria |
Scoring by quarter: 29–21, 28–24, 15–21, 21–20
| Pts: Salaün 19; Rebs: Badiane 7 Asts: Astier 6 | | Pts: Okonkwo 16; Rebs: Balogun 9 Asts: Amukamara 4 |

Astroballe, Villeurbanne
Attendance: 4,213
Referees: Maripier Malo (CAN), Jean Ruhamiriza (RWA), Paulina Gajdosz (POL)

17 March 2026
14:00

Report

| Philippines | 74–59 | Colombia |
Scoring by quarter: 14–14, 19–26, 18–7, 23–12
| Pts: Dela Rosa 25; Rebs: Dela Rosa 18; Asts: Berberabe 4 | | Pts: Muñoz 14; Rebs: Moscarella 12; Asts: Rios 4 |

Astroballe, Villeurbanne
Attendance: 942
Referees: Julirys Guzmán (PUR), Paulina Gajdosz (POL), Jean Ruhamiriza (RWA)

17 March 2026
17:00

Report

| Nigeria | 73–81 | Germany |
Scoring by quarter: 14–17, 17–18, 21–19, 21–27
| Pts: Balogun 15; Rebs: Macaulay 7 Asts: Kalu 5 | | Pts: Fiebich 15; Rebs: Sabally 8 Asts: Peterson, Fiebich 8 |

Astroballe, Villeurbanne
Attendance: 301
Referees: Gatis Saliņš (LAT), Maripier Malo (CAN), Ioannis Agrafiotis (GRE)

17 March 2026
20:30

Report

| South Korea | 62–89 | France |
Scoring by quarter: 16–19, 15–13, 14–21, 17–36
| Pts: Kang L. 17; Rebs: Park J.-h., Kang L. 5 Asts: Park J.-s. 7 | | Pts: Johannès 24; Rebs: Ayayi, Johannes 7 Asts: Ayayi 6 |

Astroballe, Villeurbanne
Attendance: 2,026
Referees: Waseem Husainy (CAN), Arnold Moseya (RSA), Jacquiline Dover (AUS)

== Most Valuable Player ==
| Tournament | Host | MVP | Source |
|---|---|---|---|
| Tournament A | Wuhan, China | Julie Allemand | |
| Tournament B | San Juan, Puerto Rico | Caitlin Clark | |
| Tournament C | Istanbul, Turkey | Sami Whitcomb | |
| Tournament D | Lyon-Villeurbanne, France | Janelle Salaün | |

== All Star Five ==
| Tournament | Host | | | | | | Source |
|---|---|---|---|---|---|---|---|
| Tournament A | Wuhan,China | Julie Allemand | Emma Meesseman | Yang Shuyu | Maimouna Haidara | Emma Čechová | |
| Tournament B | San Juan, Puerto Rico | Megan Gustafson | Cecilia Zandalasini | Caitlin Clark | Kelsey Plum | Imani McGee-Stafford | |
| Tournament C | Istanbul, Turkey | Sami Whitcomb | Kennedy Burke | Mai Yamamoto | Dorka Juhász | Aaliyah Edwards | |
| Tournament D | Lyon-Villeurbanne, France | Janelle Salaün | Marine Johannès | Victoria Macaulay | Frieda Bühner | Leeseul Kang | |
