= 2025 FIBA Women's AfroBasket qualification =

Basketball tournament qualification stage

Official website
- www.fiba.basketball

The 2025 FIBA Women's AfroBasket qualification was played on various dates in 2025 to determine the seven teams who qualify for the 2025 FIBA Women's AfroBasket. Teams competed with other teams in their respective zones for a spot in the championship tournament. There were seven zones in total.

== Zone 4 ==
Two teams played a two-game series to determine the qualified team.

=== Overview ===
Team 1	Agg.	Team 2	1st leg	2nd leg
DR Congo	99–142	Cameroon	49–75	50–67

=== Games ===
20 August 2024	DR Congo	49–75	Cameroon	Kinshasa, DR Congo
7:00	Scoring by quarter: 6–17, 20–26, 3–12, 20–20
	Pts: Pembe 15; Rebs: Kokolo 8 Asts: Kokolo 3	Boxscore	Pts: Fankam Mendjiadeu 16; Rebs: Silatsa 11; Asts: Akoa 6	Arena: Stadium des Martyrs

21 August 2024	Cameroon	67–50	DR Congo	Kinshasa, DR Congo
7:00	Scoring by quarter: 13–17, 21–7, 16–10, 17–16
	Pts: Akoa 15; Rebs: Effa 7 Asts: Akoa 5	Boxscore	Pts: Ikete 15; Rebs: Ikete 7 Asts: Kokolo 3	Arena: Stadium des Martyrs

== Zone 5 ==
Six teams were supposed to take part in the Zone 5 qualifier. However, Tanzania withdrew before the tournament due to lack of preparation.

=== Preliminary round ===
==== Standings ====
Pos	Team	Pld	W	L	PF	PA	PD	Pts	Qualification
1	Egypt (H)	4	4	0	336	228	+108	8	Final
2	Uganda	4	3	1	289	220	+69	7	Final
3	South Sudan	4	2	2	296	283	+13	6	Third place game
4	Kenya	4	1	3	274	301	−27	5	Third place game
5	Burundi	4	0	4	169	332	−163	4	

Source: FIBA
Rules for classification: 1) Points; 2) Head-to-head; 3) Points difference; 4) Points scored.
(H) Hosts

==== Results ====
3 February 2025	Kenya	56–78	Uganda	Cairo
15:30	Scoring by quarter: 11–23, 17–17, 9–17, 19–21
	Pts: Reynolds 13; Rebs: Wanyama 8 Asts: Reynolds 6	Boxscore	Pts: Asinde 24; Rebs: Asinde 9 Asts: Nanvubya 7	Arena: Hassan Moustafa Sports Hall

3 February 2025	Egypt	102–40	Burundi	Cairo
18:00	Scoring by quarter: 33–8, 24–15, 30–8, 15–9
	Pts: Mohamed 22; Rebs: El-Gedawy 8 Asts: Moussa 9	Boxscore	Pts: Irakoze 10; Rebs: Nezerwa 9 Asts: Uwineza 6	Arena: Hassan Moustafa Sports Hall

4 February 2025	South Sudan	86–69	Kenya	Cairo
15:30	Scoring by quarter: 14–19, 24–11, 23–15, 25–24
	Pts: Washington 26; Rebs: Macuei 11; Asts: Washington 7	Boxscore	Pts: Reynolds 19; Rebs: Reynolds 8 Asts: Reynolds 7	Arena: Hassan Moustafa Sports Hall

4 February 2025	Uganda	62–65	Egypt	Cairo
18:00	Scoring by quarter: 14–23, 18–10, 9–13, 21–19
	Pts: Robinson 24; Rebs: Asinde 14; Asts: Asinde 5	Boxscore	Pts: El-Gedawy 20; Rebs: El-Gedawy 10; Asts: Moussa 13	Arena: Hassan Moustafa Sports Hall

5 February 2025	Kenya	87–53	Burundi	Cairo
15:30	Scoring by quarter: 26–10, 8–15, 25–16, 28–12
	Pts: Reynolds 22; Rebs: Wanyama 7 Asts: Reynolds 7	Boxscore	Pts: Nezerwa 20; Rebs: Nezerwa 8 Asts: Kanyamuneza 4	Arena: Hassan Moustafa Sports Hall; Attendance: 5

5 February 2025	Uganda	83–69	South Sudan	Cairo
18:00	Scoring by quarter: 27–17, 23–14, 18–20, 13–13
	Pts: Asinde 28; Rebs: Akello, Asinde 9 Asts: Nanvubya, Robinson 4	Boxscore	Pts: Washington 24; Rebs: Macuei 10; Asts: Washington 5	Arena: Hassan Moustafa Sports Hall

6 February 2025	Burundi	30–66	Uganda	Cairo
15:30	Scoring by quarter: 17–14, 4–15, 5–17, 4–20
	Pts: Nezerwa 10; Rebs: Nezerwa 10; Asts: Kanyamuneza 5	Boxscore	Pts: Nansikombi 14; Rebs: Akullu 7 Asts: Asinde 8	Arena: Hassan Moustafa Sports Hall

6 February 2025	South Sudan	64–85	Egypt	Cairo
18:00	Scoring by quarter: 20–19, 16–25, 12–24, 16–17
	Pts: Teny 20; Rebs: Bulgak 10; Asts: Washington 6	Boxscore	Pts: El-Gedawy 20; Rebs: El-Gedawy 13; Asts: Bakr 8	Arena: Hassan Moustafa Sports Hall

7 February 2025	South Sudan	77–46	Burundi	Cairo
15:30	Scoring by quarter: 16–10, 25–14, 23–13, 13–9
	Pts: Bulgak 15; Rebs: Bulgak 13; Asts: Washington 12	Boxscore	Pts: Nezerwa 15; Rebs: Nsanzabaganwa, Nezerwa 6 Asts: Nsanzabaganwa, Uwineza 4	Arena: Hassan Moustafa Sports Hall; Attendance: 100

7 February 2025	Egypt	84–62	Kenya	Cairo
18:00	Scoring by quarter: 20–19, 15–13, 26–15, 23–15
	Pts: Sayed 27; Rebs: Sayed 10; Asts: Abdelnabi, Moussa 7	Boxscore	Pts: Reynolds 21; Rebs: Wanyama 16; Asts: Wanyama 5	Arena: Hassan Moustafa Sports Hall; Attendance: 100

=== Third place game ===
8 February 2025	South Sudan	80–63	Kenya	Cairo
15:30	Scoring by quarter: 32–13, 15–25, 18–12, 15–13
	Pts: Washington 25; Rebs: Macuei 19; Asts: Washington 7	Boxscore	Pts: Reynolds 21; Rebs: Omondi 7 Asts: Omondi 5	Arena: Hassan Moustafa Sports Hall; Attendance: 200

=== Final ===
8 February 2025	Egypt	63–74	Uganda	Cairo
18:30	Scoring by quarter: 18–19, 11–21, 16–21, 18–13
	Pts: El-Gedawy 19; Rebs: El-Gedawy 11; Asts: Moussa 7	Boxscore	Pts: Asinde 19; Rebs: Asinde 12; Asts: Asinde, Nanvubya 5	Arena: Hassan Moustafa Sports Hall; Attendance: 300

== Zone 6 ==
Two teams played a two-game series to determine the qualified team.

=== Overview ===
Team 1	Agg.	Team 2	1st leg	2nd leg
Angola	109–108	Mozambique	44–50	65–58

=== Games ===
3 February 2025	Angola	44–50	Mozambique	Luanda, Angola
18:00	Scoring by quarter: 10–9, 14–14, 10–16, 10–11
	Pts: Caetano 17; Rebs: Caetano 12; Asts: Lucas, Matiquite 3	Boxscore	Pts: Mucauro 12; Rebs: Veloso 10; Asts: Veloso 6	Arena: Pavilhão da Cidadela; Attendance: 1,123

4 February 2025	Mozambique	58–65	Angola	Luanda, Angola
18:00	Scoring by quarter: 12–25, 19–7, 15–21, 12–12
	Pts: Lucas 28; Rebs: Caetano 13; Asts: Caetano 7	Boxscore	Pts: Mucauro 18; Rebs: Covane, Veloso 7 Asts: Lhavanguane 3	Arena: Pavilhão da Cidadela; Attendance: 3,789

== Qualified teams ==
Team	Qualification method	Date of qualification	Appearance(s)				Previous best performance (Note: Bold text indicates they hosted that edition.)	WR (Note: World ranking at start of tournament.)
Team	Qualification method	Date of qualification	Total	First	Last	Streak	Previous best performance	WR
Ivory Coast	Host nation	26 March 2024	16th	1977	2023	5	Fourth place (1977, 2009)	48
Nigeria	2023 Women's AfroBasket semi-finalists	26 March 2024	15th	1974	2023	12	**Champions** (Six times) (Note: Nigeria have won in 2003, 2005, 2017, 2019, 2021 and 2023.)	12
Senegal	2023 Women's AfroBasket semi-finalists	26 March 2024	26th	1966	2023	17	**Champions** (Eleven times) (Note: Senegal have won in 1974, 1977, 1979, 1981, 1984, 1990, 1993, 1997, 2000, 2009 and 2015.)	25
Mali	2023 Women's AfroBasket semi-finalists	26 March 2024	21st	1968	2023	14	**Champions** (2007)	20
Rwanda	2023 Women's AfroBasket semi-finalists	26 March 2024	4th	2009	2023	2	Fourth place (**2023**)	74
Cameroon	Zone 4 winner	21 August 2024	15th	1983	2023	10	Runners-up (**2015**)	41
Angola	Zone 6 winner	4 February 2025	21st	1981	2023	21	**Champions** (2011, 2013)	46
Uganda	Zone 5 winner	8 February 2025	4th	1997	2023	2	Seventh place (2023)	55
Egypt	Wildcard	8 March 2025	15th	1966	2023	7	**Champions** (1966, **1968**)	37
Mozambique	Wildcard	8 March 2025	19th	1983	2023	13	Runners-up (1986, **2003**, **2013**)	32
South Sudan	Wildcard	25 March 2025	1st	Debut				86
Guinea	Wildcard	20 April 2025	11th	1966	2023	3	Runners-up (**1966**)	91
