= Adut =

Adut is an African feminine given name. Notable people with the name include:

- Adut Akech (born 1999), South Sudanese-Australian model
- Adut Bulgak (born 1992), South Sudanese-Canadian basketball player
