= New Hope Academy =

Coordinates: 38.944264°N 76.894943°W

Location
- 7009 Varnum Street; Hyattsville, Maryland 20784; United States

Information
- Type: Private School
- Established: 1990; 36 years ago
- Colors: Blue, Green, and Gold
- Website: www.newhopeacademy.org

New Hope Academy, which includes New Hope International High School, is an academically oriented pre-school through high school private school, founded in 1990, and located on a former public school 8-acre (32,000 m^{2}) campus in Landover Hills, Prince George's County, MD (near Washington, D.C.).

== Religious affiliation ==
The religious affiliation of the founders of the school, 12 mothers from the same church - is the Unification Church, but it is not a church school and no religion classes are offered. Nevertheless, the Unification Church (and its founder Sun Myung Moon) is controversial. The school was set up using a "community of religions" model of allowing expression of faith instead of banning them. Most of the students and even most of the faculty are not Unification Church members. Rather they represent a variety of religious beliefs and practices. The school is legally independent of the Unification Church, governed by a board of directors set up by the founding mothers, which consists of people who have varying current relationships to the Unification Church as well as members of other religions.

== Challenges ==
The aging building, a former public elementary school built in the 1940s, had a leaky roof until a second mortgage was taken out in 2003 to pay for $600,000 in renovations which included replacing the roof, various upgrades, automated library services, and a new science lab. Even so, not every physical aspect of the school was renovated, but the school as part of its mission to serve Prince George's County deliberately seeks to keep tuition costs low.

== Notable alumni ==
- Maria Gakdeng (2021), basketball player
