= Zambia women's national under-16 basketball team =

Zambia
- FIBA zone: FIBA Africa

World Championships
- Appearances: None

African Championships
- Appearances: None

The Zambia women's national under-16 basketball team is a national basketball team of Zambia, administered by the Zambia Basketball Association (ZBA).

It represents the country in international under-16 (under age 16) women's basketball competitions.

== History ==
It appeared at the 2015 FIBA Africa Under-16 Championship for Women qualification stage.

In December 2022, Zambia finished as silver medallists in the women's under-16 category at the AUSC Region 5 Games held in Lilongwe, Malawi. The team placed second behind Angola and ahead of the host nation, Malawi.

This result earned Zambia a wild-card qualification to the 2023 FIBA U16 Women's African Championship, scheduled to take place in Monastir, Tunisia from 13 to 23 July 2023.

However, the ZBF later confirmed that it had failed to raise the required K1.4 million (~USD 70,000) needed to send both the men's and women's under-16 teams to Tunisia. As a result, both teams withdrew from the tournament.

== Development and Future ==
In preparation for the 2025 AUSC Region 5 Games set to take place in Namibia, Zambia launched a nationwide talent identification program in April 2025. Trials were conducted across several provinces under the guidance of head coach Noah Mabutwe. Sixteen players were shortlisted, including promising athletes Amina Kayombo and Mwaka Kaloba.

During the 2023 withdrawal, ZBF official Danny Mwikisa emphasized the federation’s long-term youth development strategy, which includes plans to establish national youth championships and regional basketball “hubsites” across the country.

== See also ==
- Zambia women's national basketball team
- Zambia men's national under-16 basketball team
