= United Arab Republic women's national basketball team =

United Arab Republic
- Joined FIBA: 1958
- FIBA zone: FIBA Africa
- National federation: United Arab Republic Basketball Federation

AfroBasket
- Appearances: 3
- Medals: Gold: (1966, 1968)
Home	Away

The United Arab Republic women's national basketball team or in (Arabic: منتخب الجمهورية العربية المتحدة للسيدات لكرة السلة) was a historical women's national basketball team that existed between the year 1958–1971 that has represented the United Arab Republic which was a union between Egypt (including the occupied Gaza Strip) and Syria.

== History ==
The United Arab Republic women's national basketball team has since the foundation back in 1958 won two African Championships from 3 appearances but has no appearances of World Championship nor in the Olympics.

== Performance table ==
=== FIBA Africa Championship ===
Year	Position	Tournament	Hosts
1966	1st place, gold medalist(s)	1966 FIBA Africa Championship for Women	Guinea
1968	1st place, gold medalist(s)	1968 FIBA Africa Championship for Women	United Arab Republic
1970	2nd place, silver medalist(s)	1970 FIBA Africa Championship for Women	Togo

=== African Games ===
Year	Position	Tournament	Hosts
1965	3rd place, bronze medalist(s)	1965 All-Africa Games	Congo
