= Zambia men's national under-16 basketball team =

Zambia
- FIBA zone: FIBA Africa

World Championships
- Appearances: None

African Championships
- Appearances: None

The Zambia national under-16 basketball team is a national basketball team of Zambia, administered by the Zambia Basketball Association (ZBA).

It represents the country in international under-16 (under age 16) basketball competitions.

== Competition History ==
It appeared at the 2015 FIBA Africa Under-16 Championship qualification stage.

In 2023, the team qualified for the FIBA Under-16 African Championship (Afrobasket U16), held in Tunisia from 13 to 23 July. Zambia earned a wild card entry following a silver-medal finish at the qualifying tournament during the 2022 African Union Sports Council Region 5 Games in Lilongwe, Malawi.

The team joined other qualified nations such as Tunisia, Chad, and others at the tournament. The players were primarily selected from the Teulings Youth Sports Challenge, a development programme hosted at the Zambia Olympic Youth Development Centre, which has played a pivotal role in nurturing young basketball talent in the country.

== Funding and Preparation ==
Ahead of the 2023 Afrobasket U16 tournament, the ZBA announced it was seeking K1.4 million to fund the team's travel, accommodation, and competition expenses. The association called on government and private sector stakeholders to support the junior team’s participation, emphasizing the importance of international exposure for grassroots development.

== Players ==
Several members of the 2023 squad, including Patrick Chimanga, Mathews Musole, and Francis Mutale, were identified through domestic youth competitions and development programmes such as the Teulings games.

== See also ==
- Zambia men's national basketball team
- Zambia women's national under-16 basketball team
