= Joëlly Belleka =

French basketball player

Joelly Belleka (born 27 August 1995, in Orléans) is a French basketball player who plays for club Arras of the Ligue Féminine de Basketball the top league of basketball of women in France.
