= Assouma Uwizeye =

Rwandan Female basketballer

No. 11 – APR
- Position: Forward

Personal information
- Born: 6 April 1996 (age 30)
- Listed height: 6 ft 0 in (1.83 m)

Assouma Uwizeye (born 6 April 1996) is a Rwandan basketball player for the Rwanda Women's National Team.

== National Team career ==
Uwizeye represented Rwanda at the 2022 FIBA Africa Women's Champions Cup, where she averaged 9.3 points and 8.8 rebounds per game.

During the 2023 Fiba women's Zone V AfroBasket Qualifiers, Uwizeye was recognized as one of the top performers alongside, Odile Tetero and Marie Imanizabayo, who came off the bench for 15 points and averaged 5 rebounds. She also participated in the 2023 Women's Afrobasket where she scored 6 points and 2 rebounds in the first quarter of the game.
