= Maria Gakdeng =

South Sudanese-American basketball player

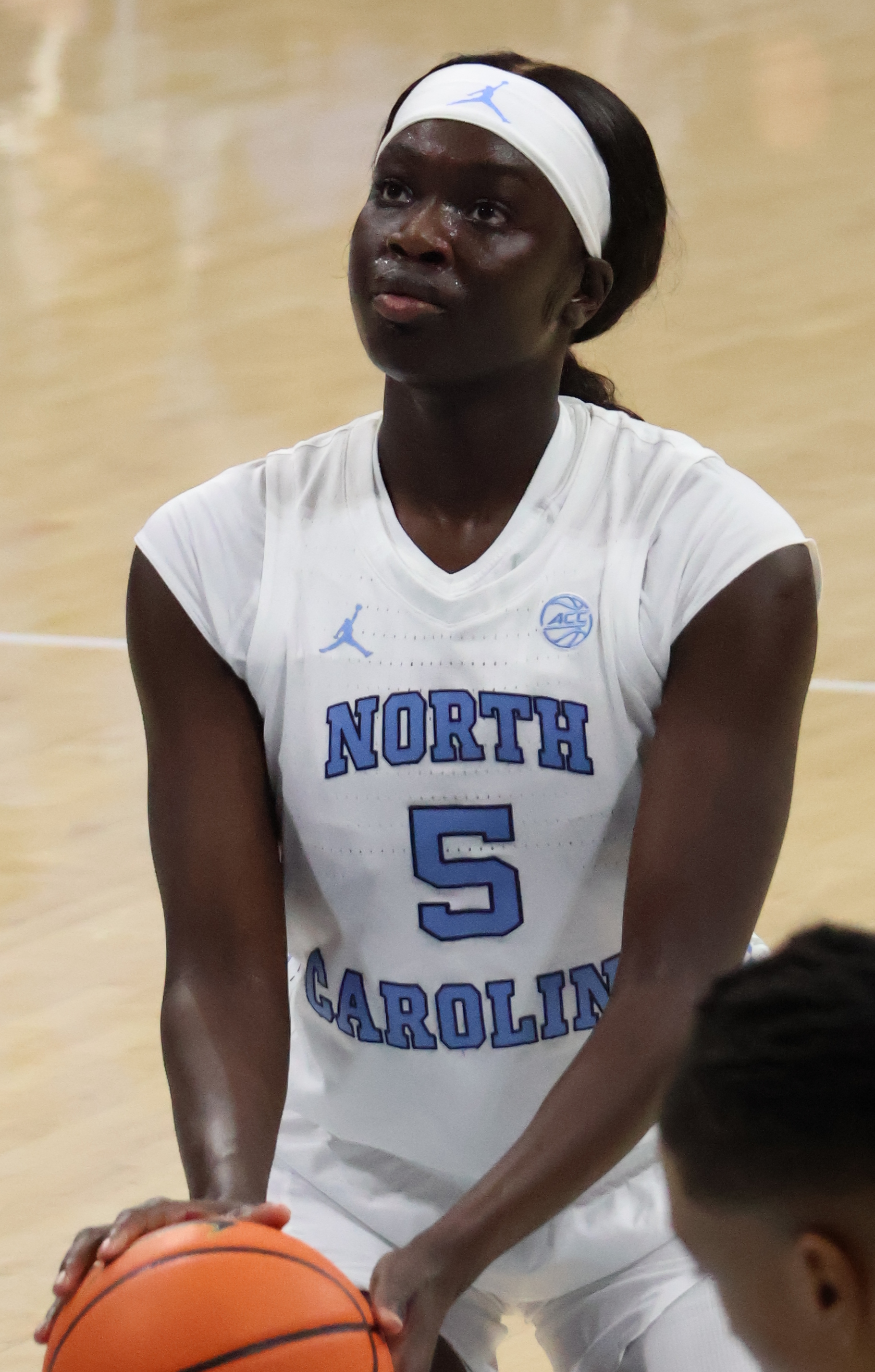
- Gakdeng with North Carolina in 2024

No. 6 – Toronto Tempo
- Position: Center
- League: WNBA

Personal information
- Born: June 9, 2003 (age 23) Atlanta, Georgia, U.S.
- Listed height: 6 ft 3 in (1.91 m)

Career information
- High school: Archbishop Carroll (Washington, D.C.); New Hope Academy (Hyattsville, Maryland)
- College: Boston College (2021–2023); North Carolina (2023–2025)
- WNBA draft: 2025: undrafted

Career highlights
- Second-team All-ACC (2025); ACC All-Freshman Team (2022)
- Stats at Basketball Reference

Maria Gakdeng (born June 9, 2003) is a South Sudanese-American professional basketball player for the Toronto Tempo of the Women's National Basketball Association (WNBA). KSC Szekszárd of the Hungarian A Division. She played college basketball for Boston College Eagles and the North Carolina Tar Heels.

== Early life and high school career ==
Gakdeng was born in Atlanta, Georgia, to South Sudanese parents who fled the civil war in 1999. Her family moved to Lanham, Maryland, in 2011. She attended Archbishop Carroll High School in Washington, D.C., and New Hope Academy in Hyattsville, Maryland, where she was named second-team All-WCAC in her senior season.

== College career ==
=== Boston College Eagles ===
Gakdeng debuted for the Boston College Eagles on November 9, 2021, starting in an 86–60 win against Harvard. On January 6, 2022, she scored a season-high 21 points in a 95–71 win against Syracuse. She scored 16 points and made a season-high 6 blocks in a 67–51 win against Duke on February 24. She appeared in all 33 games (32 starts) in her freshman season, finishing with a 8.9 points per game, grabbing a team-high 6.3 rebounds per game, and setting a program single-season record with 73 blocks.

Gakdeng set a new career high with 22 points in a 73–63 win against Wake Forest on February 26, 2023. She finished her sophomore season with team bests in cumulative scoring, rebounding, and blocking as she averaged 11.3 points, 6.5 rebounds, and 1.3 assist per game to go with 58 total blocks. After her sophomore season, she entered the NCAA transfer portal to join a team with championship potential, choosing North Carolina over other ACC options in Louisville and Notre Dame.

=== North Carolina Tar Heels ===
Gakdeng made her North Carolina debut on November 8, 2023, scoring 13 points in a 102–49 season-opening win against Gardner–Webb. She recorded her first double-double for North Carolina with 14 points and 13 rebounds in a 76–64 loss to UConn on December 10. She scored 17 points and grabbed 10 rebounds in a 59–56 win against Michigan State in the first round of the NCAA tournament, before falling to eventual champions South Carolina in the second round. She averaged 9.2 points, 5.9 rebounds, and 1.6 blocks per game in her junior season.

On March 2, 2025, Gakdeng set a new career high with 25 points in a 78–75 loss to Virginia. She helped North Carolina earn a three seed in the NCAA tournament, hosting tournament games at home for the first time in ten years, and they reached the third round. Gakdeng finished her senior season averaging 10.8 points, 7.6 rebounds, and 1.1 blocks per game, earning second-team All-ACC honors.

== Professional career ==
On April 15, 2025, the day after going unselected in the 2025 WNBA draft, Gakdeng received an invitation to training camp with the Atlanta Dream. On May 8, she was waived by the Dream.

On June 28, 2025, it was announced that Gakdeng had signed with Hungarian club KSC Szekszárd.

On May 11, 2026, it was announced that Gakdeng had join the Greensboro Groove of the UpShot League for their inaugural season.

On September 19, 2026, Gakdeng signed a developmental contract with the Toronto Tempo.

== National team career ==
Gakdeng was named to the South Sudan national team for the 2025 Women's Afrobasket.

== Career statistics ==
Legend
| GP | Games played | GS | Games started | MPG | Minutes per game | RPG | Rebounds per game |
| APG | Assists per game | SPG | Steals per game | BPG | Blocks per game | PPG | Points per game |
| TO | Turnovers per game | FG% | Field-goal percentage | 3P% | 3-point field-goal percentage | FT% | Free-throw percentage |
| **Bold** | Career best | ° | League leader |

=== College ===
| Year | Team | GP | GS | MPG | FG% | 3P% | FT% | RPG | APG | SPG | BPG | TO | PPG |
|---|---|---|---|---|---|---|---|---|---|---|---|---|---|
| 2021–22 | Boston College | 33 | 32 | 25.5 | 58.3 | 0.0 | 57.6 | 6.3 | 0.8 | **0.8** | **2.2** | 2.5 | 8.9 |
| 2022–23 | Boston College | 33 | **33** | **29.6** | 57.8 | 0.0 | 53.8 | 6.5 | **1.3** | 0.7 | 1.8 | 2.9 | **11.3** |
| 2023–24 | UNC | 33 | 32 | 23.9 | **62.6** | 0.0 | 62.0 | 5.9 | 0.5 | 0.5 | 1.5 | **1.5** | 9.2 |
| 2024–25 | UNC | 33 | **33** | 25.4 | 58.7 | 0.0 | **65.2** | **7.6** | 0.8 | **0.8** | 1.1 | 1.7 | 10.8 |
| **Career** | | 132 | 130 | 26.1 | 59.2 | 0.0 | 59.6 | 6.6 | 0.9 | 0.7 | 1.7 | 2.1 | 10.1 |
Statistics retrieved from Sports-Reference.
