= Astroballe =

Sports venue in Lyon

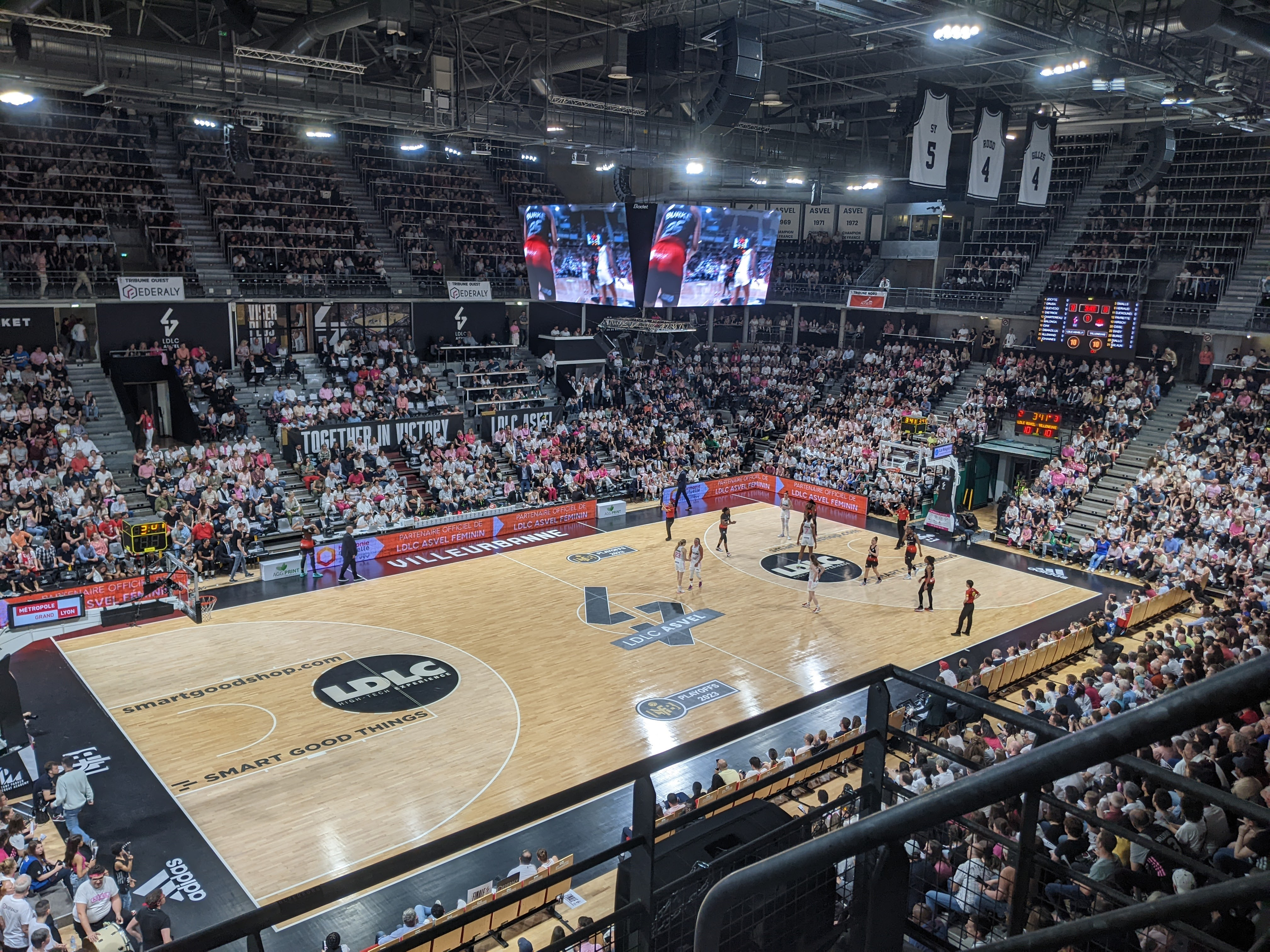
- Interior view of the Astroballe, 2023
- Interactive map of Astroballe
- Full name: L'Astroballe
- Location: 44 Avenue Marcel Cerdan 69100 Villeurbanne, Lyon, France
- Coordinates: 45°45′59″N 4°54′26″E
- Owner: City of Villeurbanne
- Capacity: Basketball: 5,556
- Surface: Parquet
- Public transit: Laurent Bonnevay–Astroballe

Construction
- Opened: 1995

Tenant
- ASVEL (1995–present)

Astroballe, or L'Astroballe is an indoor sports arena that is located in the Cusset neighborhood of Villeurbanne, Lyon, France. The arena is primarily used to host basketball games. The arena has a seating capacity of 5,556.

== History ==
The arena opened in the year 1995, and has been used as the home venue of the top-tier level French Pro A League club ASVEL.

== Access ==
The arena is accessible by the Laurent Bonnevay–Astroballe station, which is served by line A of the Lyon Metro and also by many bus and trolleybus lines.

== See also ==
- List of indoor arenas in France
