= Central African Republic women's national basketball team =

Central African Republic
- FIBA ranking: 109 ▼1 (9 February 2025)
- Joined FIBA: 1963
- FIBA zone: FIBA Africa
- National federation: Fédération Centrafricaine de Basketball
- Coach: Wilfried Gbongo

AfroBasket
- Appearances: 4
- Medals: Bronze: (1966)
| Home | Away |

The Central African Republic women's national basketball team represents the Central African Republic in international competitions. It is administered by the Fédération Centrafricaine de Basketball.

== AfroBasket record ==
- 1966 – 3rd place
- 1974 – 6th place
- 1977 – 9th place
- 2017 – 12th place

== See also ==
- Central African Republic women's national under-19 basketball team
- Central African Republic women's national under-17 basketball team
- Central African Republic women's national 3x3 team
