= Zambia women's national basketball team =

Zambia
- FIBA ranking: 112 ▼1 (9 February 2025)
- Joined FIBA: 1962
- FIBA zone: FIBA Africa
- National federation: Zambia Basketball Association (ZBA)
- Coach: ?

Olympic Games
- Appearances: None

World Cup
- Appearances: None

FIBA Africa Championship for Women
- Appearances: None
Home	Away

The Zambia women's national basketball team represents Zambia in international competitions. It is administered by the Zambia Basketball Association (ZBA).

They joined the 2011 Afrobasket for Women qualification.

== See also ==
- Zambia women's national under-19 basketball team
- Zambia women's national under-17 basketball team
- Zambia women's national 3x3 team
