= Brenda Ekone =

Ugandan basketball player

Just Kip Living Lady Dolphins (JKL Dolphins)
- League: FIBA Africa Women's Basketball League - Qualifiers (2023)

Personal information
- Listed height: 5 ft 0 in (1.52 m)

Career information
- High school: St. Mary's College; Tororo Girls School
- College: Nkumba University

Career highlights
- Real Stars sports Awards best of the year (2022)

Brenda Ekone (born 10 June 1996) is a Ugandan basketball player.

== Early life ==
Born on 10 January 1996 to Robert and Josephine Ekone in Kalaki, Kaberamaido.

Brenda started her elementary education at Nabumali Day Primary School, she proceeded to Jerisa Secondary School, then to Tororo Girls School, and Rock High School, Tororo where she completed her secondary school education.

She later proceeded to St. Mary's College, Wakiso District for her A-level where she studied History Literature, Divinity and ICT.

Brenda holds a bachelor's degree in Social Works And Social Administration (SWASA), a master's degree in Public Administration and Management from Nkumba University.

== Career ==
Brenda started her career at the age of 14. Since her basketball debut, she has played for Nkumba Lady Marines from 2014 to 2019 before she joined the JKL Lady Dolphins in 2020.

She has been named the MVP for three successive years (2017, 2018, 2019), she won her first championship in 2019.
