= Togo women's national basketball team =

Togo
- FIBA ranking: NR (8 August 2025)
- Joined FIBA: 1963
- FIBA zone: FIBA Africa
- National federation: Fédération Nationale de Basketball Togo (FTBB)

AfroBasket
- Appearances: 4
- Medals: Bronze: 1977
Home	Away

The Togo women's national basketball team represents Togo in international competitions. It is administered by the Fédération Nationale de Basketball Togo (FTBB).

== AfroBasket record ==
- 1970 – 6th place
- 1974 – 7th place
- 1977 – 3rd place
- 2003 – 10th place
