= Victoria Macaulay =

Nigerian-American basketball player (born 1990)

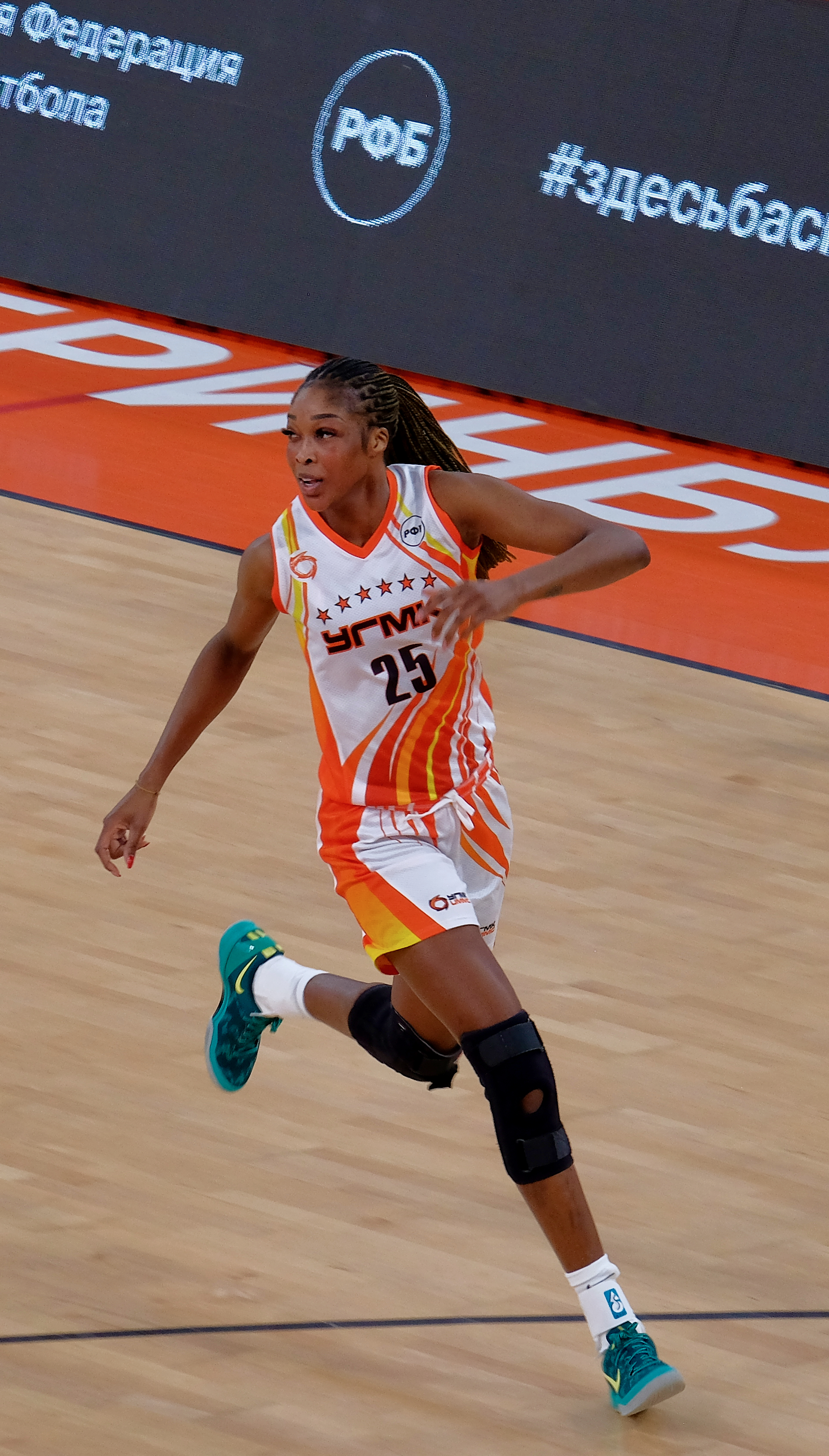
- Macaulay in 2024

Personal information
- Born: 7 August 1990 (age 36) Staten Island, New York, U.S
- Listed height: 1.93 m (6 ft 4 in)
- Listed weight: 75 kg (165 lb)

Career information
- High school: Curtis (Staten Island, New York)
- College: Temple (2009–2013)
- WNBA draft: 2013: undrafted
- Playing career: 2013–present
- Position: Center
- Number: 20

Career history
- 2013–2014: Lavezzini Parma
- 2014–2015: Saces Mapei Dike Napoli
- 2015: Chicago Sky
- 2015–2016: Energa Torun
- 2016–2017: Cavigal Nice Basket
- 2017: Shinhan Bank S-Birds Anshan
- 2017–2019: Olympiacos
- 2019: Chicago Sky
- 2019–2020: Galatasaray

Career highlights
- A-10 All-Defensive Team (2013)
- Stats at WNBA.com
- Stats at Basketball Reference

Victoria Ayo Macaulay (born 7 August 1990) is a Nigerian-American professional basketball player. In both 2015 and 2019 she played for Chicago Sky in the Women's National Basketball Association.

== College statistics ==
Legend
GP	Games played	GS	Games started	MPG	Minutes per game
FG%	Field goal percentage	3P%	3-point field goal percentage	FT%	Free throw percentage
RPG	Rebounds per game	APG	Assists per game	SPG	Steals per game
BPG	Blocks per game	PPG	Points per game	**Bold**	Career high

Year	Team	GP	Points	FG%	3P%	FT%	RPG	APG	SPG	BPG	PPG
2009–10	Temple	26	78	43.2	–	38.1	2.7	0.2	0.4	0.6	3.0
2010–11	Temple	**33**	152	40.7	–	40.8	4.5	0.4	0.5	1.6	4.6
2011–12	Temple	30	290	**51.0**	–	67.7	7.5	0.7	0.6	1.7	9.7
2012–13	Temple	32	**452**	42.9	**40.0**	**68.2**	**9.4**	**1.5**	**1.1**	**2.8**	**14.1**
Career	Temple	121	972	44.7	33.3	60.5	6.1	0.7	0.7	1.7	8.0

== Professional career ==
During her time at the French side Nice, she averaged 15.8 points, 8.6 rebounds and 0.8 rebounds.

== WNBA career statistics ==
Legend
GP	Games played	GS	Games started	MPG	Minutes per game	RPG	Rebounds per game
APG	Assists per game	SPG	Steals per game	BPG	Blocks per game	PPG	Points per game
TO	Turnovers per game	FG%	Field-goal percentage	3P%	3-point field-goal percentage	FT%	Free-throw percentage
**Bold**	Career best	°	League leader

=== Regular season ===
Year	Team	GP	GS	MPG	FG%	3P%	FT%	RPG	APG	SPG	BPG	TO	PPG
2015	Chicago	4	0	**6.3**	.286	.000	.000	**1.0**	0.0	**0.5**	**0.3**	**0.8**	1.0
2019	Chicago	**5**	0	4.4	**.400**	.000	**1.000**	0.8	0.0	0.4	0.2	0.0	**1.2**
Career	2 years, 1 team	9	0	5.2	.333	.000	1.000	0.9	0.0	0.4	0.2	0.3	1.1

== Nigerian National Team ==
Macaulay was called up and represented Nigeria at the 2019 FIBA Women's AfroBasket where the team won gold defeating the host Senegal in Dakar. She averaged 6.4 points, 3.4 rebounds and 1.2 assists during the tournament in Dakar. She also participated in the 2020 FIBA Women's Olympic Qualifying Tournaments in Belgrade.
