= South Sudan women's national basketball team =

Women's national basketball team representing South Sudan

South Sudan
- FIBA ranking: 42 ▲13 (18 March 2026)
- Joined FIBA: 2013
- FIBA zone: FIBA Africa
- National federation: SSBF
- Coach: Alberto Antuña
- Nickname: Bright Starlets

AfroBasket
- Appearances: 1
- Medals: (bronze) Bronze: (2025)
Home	Away

First international
- South Sudan 65–95 Egypt (Kigali, Rwanda; 12 July 2021)

Biggest win
- Rwanda 40–54 South Sudan (Kampala, Uganda; 16 February 2023)

Biggest defeat
- Belgium 102–64 South Sudan (Wuhan, China; 15 March 2026)

The South Sudan women's national basketball team represents South Sudan in international women's basketball competitions. South Sudan made their Women's AfroBasket debut in 2025.

== History ==
The FIBA Women's AfroBasket 2021 Zone 5 Qualifiers marked the first time South Sudan was represented in women's basketball at the international level since gaining independence in 2011 and becoming a FIBA member in 2013. the team was placed in Zone 5 Group A, with Egypt, Kenya, Rwanda. South Sudan played its first official international game on 12 July 2021, against the Egyptian team. They lost to Egypt by 30 points (65–95).

In 2023, South Sudan marked history by winning its first international game against Rwanda by a margin of 14 points. They qualified for the 2025 Women's Afrobasket by receiving a wildcard.

== Competitive record ==
=== Olympic Games ===
Olympic Games					Qualifying		
Year	Position	Pld	W	L	Pld	W	L
(Brazil) 2016	No national representative						
(Japan) 2020	No national representative						
(France) 2024	Did not enter				Did not enter		
(United States) 2028	To be determined				To be determined		
Total	0/1						

=== FIBA Women's World Cup ===
Women's World Cup					Qualification		
Year	Position	Pld	W	L	Pld	W	L
(Turkey) 2014	No national representative						
(Spain) 2018	No national representative						
(Australia) 2022	Did not enter				Did not enter		
(Germany) 2026	Did not qualify				5	0	5
(Japan) 2030	To be determined				To be determined		
Total	0/1						

=== AfroBasket Women ===
AfroBasket Women					Qualification		
Year	Position	Pld	W	L	Pld	W	L
(Mozambique) 2013	No national representative						
(Cameroon) 2015	No national representative						
(Mali) 2017	No national representative						
(Senegal) 2019	No national representative						
(Cameroon) 2021	Did not qualify				5	0	5
(Rwanda) 2023	Did not qualify				5	1	4
(Ivory Coast) 2025	3rd place, bronze medalist(s)	6	3	3	5	3	2
Total	1/3	6	3	3	15	4	11

== Current roster ==
Roster for the 2025 Women's Afrobasket.

South Sudan women's national basketball team roster
Players
Coaches

Pos.	No.	Name	Age – Date of birth	Height	Club	Ctr.
PG	00	Delicia Washington	28 – 11 May 1997	1.67 m (5 ft 6 in)	Fuerza Regia Femenil	(Mexico)
SG	0	Sarah Deng	20 – 14 September 2004	1.75 m (5 ft 9 in)	Florida Gators	(United States)
C	2	Adut Bulgak	32 – 20 December 1992	1.93 m (6 ft 4 in)	Fundación Asnimo	(Spain)
PG	3	Shanyce Makuei	25 – 6 January 2000	1.66 m (5 ft 5 in)	Sporting Clube Coimbrões	(Portugal)
G	4	Nyamuoch Teny	27 – 1 January 1998	1.67 m (5 ft 6 in)	COD Meknès	(Morocco)
C	5	Maria Gakdeng	22 – 9 June 2003	1.89 m (6 ft 2 in)	KSC Szekszárd	(Hungary)
SG	6	Anegor Wol	27 – 25 June 1998	1.69 m (5 ft 7 in)	Alberta Golden Bears and Pandas	(Canada)
F	7	Nyamer Diew	23 – 10 December 2001	1.72 m (5 ft 8 in)	Colorado Buffaloes	(United States)
F	8	Rose Macuei	25 – 24 April 2000	1.87 m (6 ft 2 in)	REG Women BBC	(Rwanda)
SG	11	Yar Mayen	26 – 25 September 1998	1.65 m (5 ft 5 in)	Lakeside Lightning	(Australia)
PG	21	Perina Leime	23 – 20 February 2002	1.65 m (5 ft 5 in)	Little Rock Trojans	(United States)
C	32	Piath Gabriel	33 – 2 August 1991	1.91 m (6 ft 3 in)	Valencia Basket Club SAD	(Spain)

Head coach

- (Spain) Alberto Antuña

Assistant coach(es)

- (Spain) Alberto Carrillo
- (South Sudan) Marcus Wong

Legend

- Club – describes last
  club before the tournament
- Age – describes age
  on 26 July 2025
