= 1977 FIBA Africa Championship for Women =

1977 FIBA Women's AfroBasket
5th FIBA Women's African Basketball Championship

Tournament details
- Host country: Senegal
- Dates: December 25, 1976 - January 4, 1977
- Teams: 9 (from 53 federations)
- Venue: 1 (in 1 host city)

Final positions
- Champions: Senegal (2nd title)

Official website
- 1977 FIBA Africa Championship for Women

The 1977 FIBA Africa Championship for Women was the 5th FIBA Africa Championship for Women, played under the rules of FIBA, the world governing body for basketball, and the FIBA Africa thereof. The tournament was hosted by Senegal from December 25, 1976, to January 4, 1977.

Senegal defeated Egypt 88–56 in the final.

== Draw ==
Group A	Group B
Algeria; Ghana; Ivory Coast; Senegal	Central African Empire; Egypt; Mali; Tunisia; Togo

== Preliminary round ==
=== Group A ===
Qualified for the semi-finals

Team	Pts.	W	L	PF	PA	Diff
Senegal	6	3	0	294	127	+167
Ivory Coast	5	2	1	171	223	-52
Ghana	4	1	2	153	194	-41
Algeria	3	0	3	148	222	-74

December 25, 1976

Boxscore

Senegal	89–37	Algeria
Scoring by half: 42-15, 47-22

Dakar

Boxscore

Ivory Coast	53–48	Ghana
Scoring by half: 20-28, 33-20

Dakar

December 26, 1976

Boxscore

Senegal	81–43	Ghana
Scoring by half: 33-22, 48-21

Dakar

December 28, 1976

Boxscore

Ivory Coast	71–51	Algeria
Scoring by half: 33-22, 38-29

Dakar

December 27, 1976

Boxscore

Senegal	124–47	Ivory Coast
Scoring by half: 60-20, 64-27

Dakar

Boxscore

Ghana	62–60	Algeria
Scoring by half: 28-34, 34-26

Dakar

=== Group B ===
Qualified for the semi-finals

Team	Pts.	W	L	PF	PA	Diff
Egypt	8	4	0	231	177	+54
Togo	6	2	2	189	176	+13
Tunisia	6	2	2	206	197	+9
Mali	6	2	2	189	225	-36
Central African Empire	4	0	4	212	252	-40

December 25, 1976

Boxscore

Tunisia	71–58	Central African Empire
Scoring by half: 36-30, 35-28

Dakar

Boxscore

Egypt	52–44	Togo
Scoring by half: 20-25, 32-19

Dakar

December 26, 1976

Boxscore

Egypt	78–53	Mali
Scoring by half: 39-29, 39-24

Dakar

Boxscore

Togo	67–62	Central African Empire
Scoring by half: 26-24, 41-38

Dakar

December 27, 1976

Boxscore

Togo	48–30	Tunisia
Scoring by half: 14-18, 34-12

Dakar

Boxscore

Mali	58–49	Central African Empire
Scoring by half: 26-30, 32-19

Dakar

December 28, 1976

Boxscore

Egypt	56–43	Central African Empire
Scoring by half: 27-24, 29-19

Dakar

Boxscore

Tunisia	68–46	Mali
Scoring by half: 31-21, 37-25

Dakar

December 29, 1976

Boxscore

Mali	32–30	Togo
Scoring by half: 13-16, 19-14

Dakar

Egypt	45–37	Tunisia
Scoring by half: n/a, n/a

Dakar

== Knockout stage ==
Semi-finals
January 2, 1977
Senegal	93
Togo	56
January 2, 1977
Egypt	66
Ivory Coast	46

Final
January 4, 1977
Senegal	88
Egypt	56
Third place
January 4, 1977
Togo	70
Ivory Coast	35

=== Semifinals ===
January 2, 1977

Boxscore

Egypt	66–46	Ivory Coast
Scoring by half: 28-26, 38-20

Dakar

Boxscore

Senegal	93–56	Togo
Scoring by half: 39-24, 54-32

Dakar

=== 7th place match ===
January 2, 1977

Boxscore

Mali	60–49	Algeria
Scoring by half: 27-21, 33-28

Dakar

=== 5th place match ===
January 2, 1977

Boxscore

Tunisia	72–56	Ghana
Scoring by half: 36-35, 36-21

Dakar

=== Bronze medal match ===
January 4, 1977

Boxscore

Togo	70–35	Ivory Coast
Scoring by half: 32-30, 38-15

Dakar

=== Final ===
January 4, 1977

Boxscore

Senegal	88–56	Egypt
Scoring by half: 38-22, 50-34

Dakar

== Final standings ==
Rank	Team	Record
Gold medal	Senegal	6–0
Silver medal	Egypt	5–1
Bronze medal	Togo	3–3
4	Ivory Coast	3–3
5	Tunisia	3–2
6	Ghana	2–3
7	Mali	3–2
8	Algeria	1–4
8	Central African Empire	0–4

== Awards ==
1977 FIBA Africa Championship for Women winners

Senegal
Second title

Most Valuable Player
