= 1966 FIBA Africa Championship for Women =

1966 FIBA Women's AfroBasket
1st FIBA Women's African Basketball Championship

Tournament details
- Host country: Guinea
- Dates: April 10–15, 1966
- Teams: 4 (from 53 confederations)
- Venue: 1 (in 1 host city)

Final positions
- Champions: United Arab Republic (1st title)

Official website
- 1966 FIBA Africa Championship for Women

The 1966 FIBA Africa Championship for Women was the 1st FIBA Africa Championship for Women, played under the rules of FIBA, the world governing body for basketball, and the FIBA Africa thereof. The tournament was hosted by the Guinea from April 10 to 15, 1966.

On day 3 of the competition the United Arab Republic had a 1-1 record while Guinea had a 2-0 record. The United Arab Republic won the match 35-23 with both teams finishing with a 2-1 record but the U.A.R. benefitting from the head-to-head advantage and thus becoming the first African women's basketball champion.

== Participating teams ==
Central African Republic
Guinea
Senegal
United Arab Republic

== Schedule ==
P	Team	M	W	L	PF	PA	Diff	Pts.
1	United Arab Rep.	3	2	1	98	67	+31	5
2	Guinea	3	2	1	75	76	-1	5
3	Central African Rep.	3	1	2	79	97	-18	4
4	Senegal	3	1	2	69	81	-12	4

April 10, 1966

Boxscore

United Arab Rep.	41–19	Central African Rep.
Scoring by half: 22-5, 19-14

Conakry

April 11, 1966

Boxscore

Guinea	21–19	Senegal
Scoring by half: 8-2, 13-17

Conakry

April 12, 1966

Boxscore

United Arab Rep.	22–25	Senegal
Scoring by half: 12-7, 10-18

Conakry

April 13, 1966

Boxscore

Central African Rep.	22–31	Guinea
Scoring by half: 15-20, 7-11

Conakry

April 14, 1966

Boxscore

Central African Rep.	38–25	Senegal
Scoring by half: 13-9, 25-16

Conakry

April 15, 1966

Boxscore

United Arab Rep.	35–23	Guinea
Scoring by half: 21-11, 14-12

Conakry

== Final standings ==
Rank	Team	Record
Gold medal	United Arab Rep.	2–1
Silver medal	Guinea	2–1
Bronze medal	Central African Rep.	1–2
4	Senegal	1–2

== Awards ==
1966 FIBA Africa Championship for Women winners

United Arab Republic
First title

Most Valuable Player
