= 1974 FIBA Africa Championship for Women =

Women basketball competition

1974 FIBA Women's AfroBasket
4th FIBA Women's African Basketball Championship

Tournament details
- Host country: Tunisia
- Dates: December 24–31, 1974
- Teams: 9 (from 53 federations)
- Venue: 1 (in 1 host city)

Final positions
- Champions: Senegal (1st title)

Official website
- 1974 FIBA Africa Championship for Women

The 1974 FIBA Africa Championship for Women was the 4th FIBA Africa Championship for Women, played under the rules of FIBA, the world governing body for basketball, and the FIBA Africa thereof. The tournament was hosted by Tunisia from December 24 to 31, 1974.

Senegal defeated Tunisia 47–44 in the final to win their first title and qualify for the 1975 FIBA Women's World Championship.

== Draw ==
Group A	Group B
Algeria; Central African Republic; Mali; Senegal; Tunisia	Egypt; Guinea; Nigeria; Togo

== Preliminary round ==
=== Group A ===
Qualified for the semi-finals

Team	Pts.	W	L	PF	PA	Diff
Senegal	8	4	0	286	192	+94
Tunisia	7	3	1	235	203	+32
Mali	6	2	2	242	250	-8
Central African Rep.	5	1	3	241	270	-29
Algeria	4	0	4	186	275	-89

December 1974

Boxscore

Senegal	72–32	Algeria
Scoring by half: 29-11, 43-21

Tunis

December 1974

Boxscore

Tunisia	58–38	Central African Rep.
Scoring by half: 36-17, 22-21

Tunis

December 1974

Boxscore

Senegal	77–64	Mali
Scoring by half: 38-36, 39-28

Tunis

December 1974

Boxscore

Tunisia	73–57	Algeria
Scoring by half: 44-27, 29-30

Tunis

December 1974

Boxscore

Mali	50–42	Algeria
Scoring by half: 20-13, 30-29

Tunis

December 1974

Boxscore

Senegal	79–58	Central African Rep.
Scoring by half: 44-29, 35-29

Tunis

December 1974

Boxscore

Mali	78–65	Central African Rep.
Scoring by half: 36-35, 42-30

Tunis

December 1974

Boxscore

Senegal	58–38	Tunisia
Scoring by half: 28-22, 30-16

Tunis

December 1974

Boxscore

Central African Rep.	80–55	Algeria
Scoring by half: 34-25, 46-30

Tunis

December 1974

Boxscore

Tunisia	66–50	Mali
Scoring by half: 24-23, 42-27

Tunis

=== Group B ===
Qualified for the semi-finals

Team	Pts.	W	L	PF	PA	Diff
Egypt	6	3	0	201	123	+78
Togo	5	2	1	131	138	-7
Nigeria	4	1	2	159	168	-9
Guinea	3	0	3	125	187	-62

December 1974

Boxscore

Nigeria	70–53	Guinea
Scoring by half: 32-15, 38-38

Tunis

December 1974

Boxscore

Egypt	59–41	Togo
Scoring by half: 24-22, 35-19

Tunis

December 1974

Boxscore

Togo	48–39	Guinea
Scoring by half: 24-18, 24-21

Tunis

December 1974

Boxscore

Egypt	73–49	Nigeria
Scoring by half: 43-29, 30-20

Tunis

December 1974

Boxscore

Togo	42–40	Nigeria
Scoring by half: 22-29, 20-11

Tunis

December 1974

Boxscore

Egypt	69–33	Guinea
Scoring by half: 39-21, 30-12

Tunis

== Knockout stage ==
5–8th classification
December 30, 1974
Nigeria	59
Guinea	47
December 30, 1974
Central African R.	2
Mali	0

5th place
December 31, 1974
Nigeria	60
Central African Rep.	30
7th place
December 31, 1974
Guinea	2
Mali	0

Semi-finals
December 30, 1974
Senegal	60
Togo	30
December 30, 1974
Egypt	46
Tunisia	47

Final
December 31, 1974
Senegal	47
Tunisia	44
Third place
December 31, 1974
Egypt	56
Togo	34

=== 5–8th classification ===
December 30, 1974

Central African Rep.	2–0	Mali

Tunis

December 30, 1974

Boxscore

Nigeria	59–47	Guinea
Scoring by half: 27-23, 32-24

Tunis

=== Semifinals ===
December 30, 1974

Boxscore

Senegal	60–30	Togo
Scoring by half: 27-12, 33-18

Tunis

December 30, 1974

Boxscore

Egypt	46–47	Tunisia
Scoring by half: 15-17, 31-30

Tunis

=== 7th place match ===
December 31, 1974

Guinea	2–0	Mali

Tunis

=== 5th place match ===
December 31, 1974

Boxscore

Nigeria	60–30	Central African Rep.
Scoring by half: 27-12, 33-18

Tunis

=== Bronze medal match ===
December 31, 1974

Boxscore

Egypt	56–34	Togo
Scoring by half: 27-23, 29-11

Tunis

=== Final ===
December 31, 1974

Boxscore

Senegal	47–44	Tunisia
Scoring by half: 22-18, 25-26

Tunis

== Final standings ==
Qualified for the 1975 FIBA Women's World Cup

Rank	Team	Record
Gold medal	Senegal	6–0
Silver medal	Tunisia	4–2
Bronze medal	Egypt	4–1
4	Togo	2–3
5	Nigeria	3–2
6	Central African Rep.	2–4
7	Guinea	1–4
8	Mali	2–4
9	Algeria	0–4

== Awards ==
1974 FIBA Africa Championship for Women winners

Senegal
First title

Most Valuable Player
