= Adut Bulgak =

Sudanese-Canadian basketball player (born 1992)

Jacksonville Waves
- Position: Center
- League: UpShot League

Personal information
- Born: December 20, 1992 (age 33) South Sudan
- Listed height: 6 ft 4 in (1.93 m)
- Listed weight: 168 lb (76 kg)

Career information
- High school: Archbishop O'Leary (Edmonton, Alberta)
- College: Florida State (2014–2016)
- WNBA draft: 2016: 1st round, 12th overall pick
- Drafted by: New York Liberty
- Playing career: 2016–2017

Career history
- 2016: New York Liberty
- 2017: Chicago Sky
- 2017–2018: Elitzur Ramla
- 2018–2020: Maccabi Ramat Gan
- 2020–2022: Maccabi Haifa
- 2023: Flammes
- 2024: Halcones
- 2024–2025: Elitzur Ramla
- 2026–present: Jacksonville Waves
- Stats at WNBA.com
- Stats at Basketball Reference

Adut Bulgak (born December 20, 1992) is a South Sudanese-Canadian former professional basketball player for the Jacksonville Waves and South Sudan women's national basketball team. She was drafted in 2016 to the New York Liberty of the Women's National Basketball Association (WNBA). Bulgak played JUCO ball at Trinity Valley Community College.

She has played in Spain, France, Israel, South Korea, Mexico, Russia and USA.

== Professional career ==
After a brief stint in the WNBA, Bulgak established most of her professional career overseas, playing across Europe, Asia, and Latin America. She began her international career in Spain before moving to Israel, where she became a key frontcourt player in the Israeli Women's Basketball Premier League. Bulgak played for clubs including Elitzur Ramla, Maccabi Ramat Gan, and Maccabi Haifa.

Bulgak later continued her career in Russia with Nadezhda Orenburg, and in France with Flammes Carolo Basket Ardennes in the Ligue Féminine de Basketball.

She also played professionally in South Korea and Mexico, expanding her international résumé across multiple continents. In Mexico, Bulgak joined Halcones.

In addition to her club career, Bulgak has represented the South Sudan women's national basketball team in FIBA Women's AfroBasket and World Cup qualifying competitions.

On May 11, 2026, the Jacksonville Waves of the UpShot League announced the addition of Bulgak to their inaugural roster.

== Statistics ==
=== College ===
Year	Team	GP	Points	FG%	3P%	FT%	RPG	APG	SPG	BPG	PPG
2014–15	Florida State	**35**	**432**	**49.2%**	33.3%	**75.5%**	**9.5**	0.4	**0.8**	**1.5**	12.3
2015–16	Florida State	33	419	48.1%	**35.4%**	70.3%	7.8	**1.2**	0.7	1.0	**12.7**
Career		68	851	48.7%	34.4%	72.9%	8.7	0.8	0.8	1.3	12.5

=== WNBA ===
Legend
GP	Games played	GS	Games started	MPG	Minutes per game	RPG	Rebounds per game
APG	Assists per game	SPG	Steals per game	BPG	Blocks per game	PPG	Points per game
TO	Turnovers per game	FG%	Field-goal percentage	3P%	3-point field-goal percentage	FT%	Free-throw percentage
**Bold**	Career best	°	League leader

Year	Team	GP	GS	MPG	FG%	3P%	FT%	RPG	APG	SPG	BPG	TO	PPG
2016	New York	**7**	0	3.3	**45.5**	**50.0**	**75.0**	1.3	—	—	—	**0.1**	2.0
2017	Chicago	5	0	**12.2**	40.9	33.3	60.0	**4.0**	—	**1.0**	**0.4**	0.6	**4.4**
Career	2 years, 2 teams	12	0	7.0	42.4	40.0	66.7	2.4	—	0.4	0.2	0.3	3.0
Statistics retrieved from Sports Reference.
