= 2019 FIBA Women's AfroBasket =

2019 Women's AfroBasket tournament

24th FIBA Women's African Basketball Championship

Tournament details
- Host country: Senegal
- City: Dakar
- Dates: 10–18 August
- Teams: 12 (from 1 confederation)
- Venue: 1 (in 1 host city)

Final positions
- Champions: Nigeria (4th title)
- Runners-up: Senegal
- Third place: Mali

Tournament statistics
- MVP: (Nigeria) Ezinne Kalu
- Top scorer: (Mozambique) Dongue (15.8)
- Top rebounds: (Mozambique) Seda (11.4)
- Top assists: (Senegal) Diémé (7.8)
- PPG (Team): Nigeria (79.8)
- RPG (Team): Kenya (51.0)
- APG (Team): Senegal (17.8)

Official website
- www.fiba.basketball/history

The 2019 FIBA Women's AfroBasket was held from 10 to 18 August 2019 in Dakar, Senegal. It was also the first step for the qualification for FIBA Africa for the women's basketball tournament at the 2020 Summer Olympics in Tokyo, Japan. The top six teams were qualified for the African pre-qualifying tournament.

Nigeria won their second consecutive and fourth overall title after beating Senegal in the final, 60–55.

== Qualification ==
Event	Date	Location	Vacancies	Qualified
Host Nation	7 June 2019	(Ivory Coast) Abidjan	1	Senegal
2017 Women's AfroBasket semi-finalists	18–27 August 2017	(Mali) Bamako	4	Nigeria; Mali; Mozambique
2019 Women's AfroBasket Qualification Zone 1	25 July 2019 (Cancelled)	(Tunisia) Tunis	1	Tunisia
2019 Women's AfroBasket Qualification Zone 2	17–19 May 2019	(Cape Verde) Praia	1	Cape Verde
2019 Women's AfroBasket Qualification Zone 3	N/A	Ivory Coast	1	Ivory Coast
2019 Women's AfroBasket Qualification Zone 4	4–5 May 2019	(Cameroon) Yaoundé	1	Cameroon
2019 Women's AfroBasket Qualification Zone 5	26 June – 1 July 2019	Uganda	1	Egypt
2019 Women's AfroBasket Qualification Zone 6	6–8 June 2019	(Zimbabwe) Harare	1	Angola
2019 Women's AfroBasket Qualification Wildcard		(Ivory Coast) Abidjan	2	DR Congo; Kenya
Total			12	

== Venue ==
Dakar	2019 FIBA Women's AfroBasket is located in Senegal
Dakar Arena	2019 FIBA Women's AfroBasket is located in Senegal
Capacity: 15,000	2019 FIBA Women's AfroBasket is located in Senegal

== Squads ==
Each team consisted of 12 players.

== Preliminary round ==
The draw took place on 29 July 2019.

All times are local (UTC±0).

=== Group A ===
Pos	Team	Pld	W	L	PF	PA	PD	Pts	Qualification
1	Senegal (H)	2	2	0	162	83	+79	4	Quarterfinals
2	Ivory Coast	2	1	1	107	144	−37	3	Playoffs
3	Egypt	2	0	2	114	156	−42	2	Playoffs

Source: FIBA
Rules for classification: 1) Points; 2) Head-to-head results; 3) Points difference; 4) Points scored.
(H) Hosts

10 August 2019
19:00

Boxscore

Senegal	77–36	Ivory Coast
Scoring by quarter: 15–18, 22–4, 28–12, 12–2
Pts: Traoré 19; Rebs: Diagne 9 Asts: Diémé 7		Pts: K. Kouyaté 9 Rebs: K. Kouyaté, Kouakou 6 Asts: K. Kouyaté 3

Dakar Arena, Dakar
Referees: Chahinaz Boussetta (MAR), Dorothy Okatch (BOT), Erick Otieno (KEN)

11 August 2019
16:30

Boxscore

Ivory Coast	71–67	Egypt
Scoring by quarter: 20–13, 11–21, 22–13, 18–20
Pts: Diawara 32; Rebs: K. Kouyaté 12; Asts: K. Kouyaté 5		Pts: Degheidy 21; Rebs: El-Gedawy 7 Asts: Moussa 5

Dakar Arena, Dakar
Referees: Walelign Gebeto (ETH), Artur De Castro (MOZ), Mbayi Ntela (COD)

13 August 2019
19:00

Boxscore

Egypt	47–85	Senegal
Scoring by quarter: 11–25, 14–16, 16–18, 6–26
Pts: Aly 17; Rebs: Aly 9 Asts: Awad 3		Pts: Séne 17; Rebs: Diarra 11; Asts: Diémé 9

Dakar Arena, Dakar
Referees: Walelign Gebeto (ETH), David Domingos (ANG), Erick Otieno (KEN)

=== Group B ===
Pos	Team	Pld	W	L	PF	PA	PD	Pts	Qualification
1	Nigeria	2	2	0	181	65	+116	4	Quarterfinals
2	Cameroon	2	1	1	134	159	−25	3	Playoffs
3	Tunisia	2	0	2	79	170	−91	2	Playoffs

Source: FIBA
Rules for classification: 1) Points; 2) Head-to-head results; 3) Points difference; 4) Points scored.

10 August 2019
10:00

Boxscore

Nigeria	75–26	Tunisia
Scoring by quarter: 14–5, 26–5, 17–5, 18–11
Pts: Akhator 13; Rebs: Akhator 10; Asts: Kalu 3		Pts: Laouini 5 Rebs: Laouini 8 Asts: Hamrouni, Msadek 2

Dakar Arena, Dakar
Referees: Walelign Gebeto (ETH), Mbayi Ntela (COD), Mohamed Diawara (MLI)

11 August 2019
14:00

Boxscore

Tunisia	53–95	Cameroon
Scoring by quarter: 5–23, 25–21, 10–25, 13–26
Pts: Hamrouni 14; Rebs: Baccar, Hamrouni 4 Asts: Baccar 4		Pts: Dimithe 15; Rebs: Njonkou 10; Asts: Green, Mukoko 4

Dakar Arena, Dakar
Referees: Chahinaz Boussetta (TUN), David Dimongos (ANG), Mohamed Diawara (MLI)

13 August 2019
16:30

Boxscore

Cameroon	39–106	Nigeria
Scoring by quarter: 7–21, 16–28, 10–23, 6–34
Pts: Njonkou 16; Rebs: Njonkou 8 Asts: Green, Mukoko 2		Pts: four players 14; Rebs: Elonu 8 Asts: Kalu 4

Dakar Arena, Dakar
Referees: Oskars Lucis (LAT), Artur De Castro (MOZ), Joyce Muchenu (ZIM)

=== Group C ===
Pos	Team	Pld	W	L	PF	PA	PD	Pts	Qualification
1	Mali	2	2	0	153	119	+34	4	Quarterfinals
2	Angola	2	1	1	132	120	+12	3	Playoffs
3	DR Congo	2	0	2	105	151	−46	2	Playoffs

Source: FIBA
Rules for classification: 1) Points; 2) Head-to-head results; 3) Points difference; 4) Points scored.

10 August 2019
15:00

Boxscore

Mali	71–63	Angola
Scoring by quarter: 16–16, 14–10, 21–24, 20–13
Pts: Tireira 16; Rebs: Tireira 12; Asts: Traoré 6		Pts: Dizeko 17; Rebs: Manuel 10; Asts: Lucas 7

Dakar Arena, Dakar
Referees: Oskars Lucis (LAT), Aya Ahmed (EGY), Arbia Belghith (TUN)

11 August 2019
19:00

Boxscore

Angola	69–49	DR Congo
Scoring by quarter: 25–17, 13–7, 17–13, 14–12
Pts: Lucas 18; Rebs: Eusébio, Manuel 8 Asts: Lucas 6		Pts: Akonga 14; Rebs: Makiese 13; Asts: four players 2

Dakar Arena, Dakar
Referees: Oskars Lucis (LAT), Ndeye Diagne (SEN), Aya Ahmed (EGY)

13 August 2019
14:00

Boxscore

DR Congo	56–82	Mali
Scoring by quarter: 16–13, 9–22, 13–30, 18–17
Pts: Ngobeleza 12; Rebs: Akonga 8 Asts: Muganza 4		Pts: Gandega 19; Rebs: three players 7 Asts: four players 3

Dakar Arena, Dakar
Referees: Chahinaz Boussetta (MAR), Dorothy Okatch (BOT), Opeyemi Ogunleye (NGA)

=== Group D ===
Pos	Team	Pld	W	L	PF	PA	PD	Pts	Qualification
1	Mozambique	2	2	0	115	90	+25	4	Quarterfinals
2	Cape Verde	2	1	1	115	117	−2	3	Playoffs
3	Kenya	2	0	2	96	119	−23	2	Playoffs

Source: FIBA
Rules for classification: 1) Points; 2) Head-to-head results; 3) Points difference; 4) Points scored.

10 August 2019
12:30

Boxscore

Mozambique	55–39	Kenya
Scoring by quarter: 18–11, 14–9, 9–8, 14–11
Pts: Seda 15; Rebs: Seda 10; Asts: Zita 8		Pts: Wanyama 9 Rebs: Wanyama 12; Asts: four players 1

Dakar Arena, Dakar
Referees: Ndeye Diagne (SEN), Aboulaye Kamagate (CIV), Opeyemi Ogunleye (NGA)

11 August 2019
11:30

Boxscore

Kenya	57–64	Cape Verde
Scoring by quarter: 12–16, 11–16, 14–21, 20–11
Pts: Owino 15; Rebs: Owino 11; Asts: Indasi 3		Pts: Barros 19; Rebs: Vaz 12; Asts: Leitão, Livramento 5

Dakar Arena, Dakar
Referees: Joyce Muchenu (ZIM), Dorothy Okatch (BOT), Arbia Belghith (TUN)

13 August 2019
11:30

Boxscore

Cape Verde	51–60	Mozambique
Scoring by quarter: 3–10, 18–17, 8–22, 22–11
Pts: Vaz 14; Rebs: Rocha 6 Asts: Barros, Livramento 2		Pts: Cossa 10; Rebs: Seda 14; Asts: Lhavanguane, Zita 3

Dakar Arena, Dakar
Referees: Aboulaye Kamagate (CIV), Aya Ahmed (EGY), Arbia Belghith (TUN)

== Knockout stage ==
=== Bracket ===
Playoffs
14 August
Angola	64
Kenya	51
14 August
Cameroon	63
Egypt	68
14 August
Cape Verde	46
DR Congo	78
14 August
Ivory Coast	74
Tunisia	50

Quarterfinals
15 August
Senegal	88
Angola	54
15 August
Mozambique	80
Egypt	66
15 August
Nigeria	79
DR Congo	46
15 August
Mali	60
Ivory Coast	51

Semifinals
16 August
Senegal	60
Mozambique	57
16 August
Nigeria	79
Mali	58

Final
18 August
Senegal	55
Nigeria	60
Third place game
18 August
Mozambique	54
Mali	66

5th place bracket

5th–8th place semifinals
16 August
Angola	68
Egypt	66
16 August
DR Congo	54
Ivory Coast	47

Fifth place game
17 August
Angola	68
DR Congo	48
Seventh place game
17 August
Egypt	62
Ivory Coast	58

=== Playoffs ===
14 August 2019
11:30

Boxscore

Angola	64–51	Kenya
Scoring by quarter: 15–12, 14–17, 23–10, 12–12
Pts: Daniel 15; Rebs: Macuto 9 Asts: three players 2		Pts: Okoth 12; Rebs: Wanyama 8 Asts: Obunga, Indasi 3

Dakar Arena, Dakar
Referees: Opeyemi Ogunleye (NGA), Arbia Belghith (TUN), Mbayi Ntela (COD)

14 August 2019
14:00

Boxscore

Cape Verde	46–78	DR Congo
Scoring by quarter: 13–24, 8–16, 15–17, 10–21
Pts: Vaz 21; Rebs: Vaz 8 Asts: Barros 5		Pts: Ngobeleza, Mokango 15; Rebs: Mokango 14; Asts: Mfutila, Akonga 4

Dakar Arena, Dakar
Referees: Joyce Muchenu (ZIM), Aboulaye Kamagate (CIV), Mohamed Diawara (MLI)

14 August 2019
16:30

Boxscore

Cameroon	63–68	Egypt
Scoring by quarter: 18–12, 16–16, 20–12, 9–28
Pts: Mfoula 12; Rebs: Njonkou 11; Asts: Nyinkeu 4		Pts: Degheidy 23; Rebs: three players 5 Asts: Moussa 8

Dakar Arena, Dakar
Referees: Walelign Gebeto (ETH), Dorothy Okatch (BOT), Ndeye Diagne (SEN)

14 August 2019
19:00

Boxscore

Ivory Coast	74–50	Tunisia
Scoring by quarter: 16–16, 14–9, 23–8, 21–17
Pts: Diawara 27; Rebs: three players 7 Asts: Diawara 3		Pts: Loubiri 10; Rebs: Laouini, Loubiri 6 Asts: three players 1

Dakar Arena, Dakar
Referees: Artur De Castro (MOZ), David Domingos (ANG), Aya Ahmed (EGY)

=== Quarterfinals ===
15 August 2019
11:30

Boxscore

Nigeria	79–46	DR Congo
Scoring by quarter: 22–9, 16–14, 23–9, 18–14
Pts: Kalu 17; Rebs: Imovbioh 5 Asts: Akhator, Amukamara 5		Pts: Mfutila 15; Rebs: Mokango 7 Asts: Muganza 3

Dakar Arena, Dakar
Referees: Artur De Castro (MOZ), Arbia Belghith (ALG), Erick Otieno (KEN)

15 August 2019
14:00

Boxscore

Mozambique	80–66	Egypt
Scoring by quarter: 26–9, 11–19, 16–14, 27–24
Pts: Dongue 25; Rebs: Seda 13; Asts: Sita 8		Pts: Degheidy 17; Rebs: El-Gedawy 6 Asts: Moussa 5

Dakar Arena, Dakar
Referees: Chahinaz Boussetta (MAR), Aboulaye Kamagate (CIV), Opeyemi Ogunleye (NGA)

15 August 2019
16:30

Boxscore

Mali	60–51	Ivory Coast
Scoring by quarter: 14–12, 15–10, 13–18, 18–11
Pts: Gandega 15; Rebs: Coulibaly 12; Asts: Traoré, Tireira 3		Pts: K. Kouyaté 15; Rebs: M. Kouyaté 8 Asts: M. Kouyaté 3

Dakar Arena, Dakar
Referees: Walelign Gebeto (ETH), Ndeye Diagne (SEN), David Domingos (ANG)

15 August 2019
19:00

Boxscore

Senegal	88–54	Angola
Scoring by quarter: 20–17, 21–9, 23–15, 24–13
Pts: Traoré 17; Rebs: Traoré 8 Asts: Diémé 12		Pts: Macuto 11; Rebs: Macuto 7 Asts: Lucas 2

Dakar Arena, Dakar
Referees: Oskars Lucis (LAT), Dorothy Okatch (BOT), Joyce Muchenu (ZIM)

=== 5th–8th place semifinals ===
16 August 2019
11:30

Boxscore

DR Congo	54–47	Ivory Coast
Scoring by quarter: 8–19, 16–12, 23–6, 7–10
Pts: Mokango, Muganza 11; Rebs: Mokango, Muganza 8 Asts: Mambengya 7		Pts: K. Kouyaté 13; Rebs: Gnanou 10; Asts: K. Kouyaté 3

Dakar Arena, Dakar
Referees: Artur De Castro (MOZ), Mohamed Diawara (MLI), Erick Otieno (KEN)

16 August 2019
14:00

Boxscore

Angola	68–66	Egypt
Scoring by quarter: 22–20, 12–19, 11–20, 23–7
Pts: Lucas 14; Rebs: Macuto 6 Asts: Lucas 6		Pts: El-Gedawy 20; Rebs: El-Gedawy 8 Asts: Moussa 3

Dakar Arena, Dakar
Referees: Ndeye Diagne (SEN), Opeyemi Ogunleye (NGA), Mbayi Ntela (COD)

=== Semifinals ===
16 August 2019
16:30

Boxscore

Nigeria	79–58	Mali
Scoring by quarter: 25–12, 17–16, 17–12, 20–18
Pts: Kalu 19; Rebs: Akhator 13; Asts: Kalu 5		Pts: Tireira 14; Rebs: Coulibaly 10; Asts: five players 2

Dakar Arena, Dakar
Referees: Walelign Gebeto (ETH), Arbia Belghith (TUN), Dorothy Okatch (BOT)

16 August 2019
19:00

Boxscore

Senegal	60–57	Mozambique
Scoring by quarter: 8–18, 11–17, 22–9, 19–13
Pts: Traoré 16; Rebs: Diagne, Traoré 9 Asts: Diémé 7		Pts: Dongue 18; Rebs: Seda 14; Asts: Mucauro 3

Dakar Arena, Dakar
Referees: Chahinaz Boussetta (MAR), Oskars Lucis (LAT), Aya Ahmed (EGY)

=== Seventh place game ===
17 August 2019
13:30

Boxscore

Egypt	62–58	Ivory Coast
Scoring by quarter: 25–13, 7–19, 18–14, 12–12
Pts: Awad 14; Rebs: El-Shaarawy 9 Asts: Moussa 6		Pts: three players 9 Rebs: Kouyaté, Gnanou 9 Asts: Kolga 3

Dakar Arena, Dakar
Referees: Artur De Castro (MOZ), Ndeye Diagne (SEN), David Domingos (ANG)

=== Fifth place game ===
17 August 2019
16:00

Boxscore

Angola	68–48	DR Congo
Scoring by quarter: 17–12, 4–12, 22–14, 25–10
Pts: Lucas 18; Rebs: Filipe 8 Asts: Lucas 4		Pts: Akonga 9 Rebs: Akonga, Kalanga 8 Asts: Muganza, Ngobeleza 2

Dakar Arena, Dakar
Referees: Joyce Muchenu (ZIM), Opeyemi Ogunleye (NGA), Arbia Belghith (TUN)

=== Third place game ===
18 August 2019
15:30

Boxscore

Mozambique	54–66	Mali
Scoring by quarter: 8–19, 17–14, 15–18, 14–15
Pts: Dongue 22; Rebs: Cossa, Seda 6 Asts: Cossa 4		Pts: Tireira 21; Rebs: Maiga 12; Asts: Gandega 6

Dakar Arena, Dakar

=== Final ===
18 August 2019
18:00

Boxscore

Senegal	55–60	Nigeria
Scoring by quarter: 10–14, 14–18, 13–16, 18–12
Pts: Traoré 13; Rebs: Traoré 6 Asts: Diémé 4		Pts: Akhator 14; Rebs: Akhator 9 Asts: Elonu, Nyingifa 3

Dakar Arena, Dakar
Attendance: 15,000

== Final standings ==
Qualified for Africa pre-qualifying tournaments

Rank	Team	Record
1st place, gold medalist(s)	Nigeria	5–0
2nd place, silver medalist(s)	Senegal	4–1
3rd place, bronze medalist(s)	Mali	4–1
4	Mozambique	3–2
5	Angola	4–2
6	DR Congo	2–4
7	Egypt	2–4
8	Ivory Coast	2–4
9	Cape Verde	1–2
10	Cameroon	1–2
11	Kenya	0–3
12	Tunisia	0–3

== Statistics and awards ==
=== Statistical leaders ===
Points

Name	PPG
(Mozambique) Leia Dongue	15.8
(Cape Verde) Joseana Vaz	15.3
(Senegal) Astou Traoré	15.2
(Egypt) Soraya Degheidy	14.2
(Mali) Meiya Tireira	14.2

Rebounds

Name	RPG
(Mozambique) Tamara Seda	11.4
(Cameroon) Amina Njonkou	9.7
(Kenya) Mercy Wanyama	9.0
(Mali) Mariam Coulibaly	8.8
(Democratic Republic of the Congo) Chanel Mokango	8.3

Assists

Name	APG
(Senegal) Bintou Diémé	7.8
(Mozambique) Delma Zita	4.6
(Egypt) Reem Moussa	4.5
(Angola) Italee Lucas	4.2
(Mali) Touty Gandega	3.2
(Mali) Nassira Traoré	3.2
(Nigeria) Ezinne Kalu	3.2

Blocks

Name	BPG
(Angola) Ngiendula Filipe	1.0
(Democratic Republic of the Congo) Chanel Mokango	1.0
(Kenya) Fatou Diagne	1.0
(Senegal) Maimouna Diarra	1.0
(Senegal) Belinda Okoth	1.0

Steals

Name	SPG
(Nigeria) Ezinne Kalu	3.0
(Egypt) Reem Moussa	2.7
(Mozambique) Delma Zita	2.6
(Ivory Coast) Kani Kouyaté	2.5
(Mozambique) Ingvild Mucauro	2.4
(Mozambique) Tamara Seda	2.4
(Nigeria) Evelyn Akhator	2.4
(Nigeria) Adaora Elonu	2.4

=== Awards ===
The all star-teams and MVP were announced on 18 August 2019.

All-Star Team
Guards	Forwards	Center
(Nigeria) Ezinne Kalu (Mali) Touty Gandega	(Senegal) Astou Traoré (Mozambique) Leia Dongue	(Nigeria) Evelyn Akhator
MVP: (Nigeria) Ezinne Kalu
