= 2021 FIBA Women's AfroBasket =

25th FIBA Women's African Basketball Championship

Tournament details
- Host country: Cameroon
- City: Yaoundé
- Dates: 18–26 September
- Teams: 12 (from 1 confederation)
- Venue(s): 1 (in 1 host city)

Final positions
- Champions: Nigeria (5th title)
- Runners-up: Mali
- Third place: Cameroon
- Fourth place: Senegal

Tournament statistics
- Games played: 28
- Attendance: 28,000 (1,000 per game)
- MVP: (Nigeria) Adaora Elonu
- Top scorer: (Egypt) Nadine Mohamed (16.8 points per game)

Official website
- www.fiba.basketball/history

The 2021 FIBA Women's AfroBasket was the 25th edition of the tournament and held from 18 to 26 September 2021 in Yaoundé, Cameroon. The top two teams qualified for one of the qualifying tournaments for the 2022 FIBA Women's Basketball World Cup.

Nigeria defended their title and won their fifth overall title after a finals win over Mali. Cameroon secured bronze on home soil by defeating Senegal.

== Host selection ==
Cameroon was awarded the hosting rights for the championship on 12 May 2021 after Ivory Coast withdrawn their bid. This marked the second time Cameroon hosted it having done so in 2015.

== Qualification ==
Event	Date	Location	Vacancies	Qualified
Host Nation	12 May 2021		1	Cameroon
2019 Women's AfroBasket semi-finalists	10–18 August 2019	(Senegal) Dakar	4	Nigeria; Senegal; Mali; Mozambique
Qualification Zone 1			1	Tunisia
Qualification Zone 2	27–28 June 2021	(Guinea) Conakry	1	Cape Verde
Qualification Zone 3			1	Ivory Coast
Qualification Zone 5	12–17 July 2021	(Rwanda) Kigali	2	Egypt; Kenya
Qualification Zone 6			1	Angola
Wild card			1	Guinea
Total			12	

== Draw ==
The draw was held on 31 July 2021.

== Preliminary round ==
All times are local (UTC±0).

=== Group A ===
Pos	Team	Pld	W	L	PF	PA	PD	Pts	Qualification
1	Cameroon (H)	2	2	0	145	90	+55	4	Quarterfinals
2	Kenya	2	1	1	111	132	−21	3	Qualification to quarterfinals
3	Cape Verde	2	0	2	98	132	−34	2	Qualification to quarterfinals

Source: FIBA
Rules for classification: 1) Points; 2) Head-to-head results; 3) Points difference; 4) Points scored.
(H) Hosts

18 September 2021
17:00

Boxscore

Cameroon	74–50	Kenya
Scoring by quarter: 21–17, 18–16, 26–6, 9–11
Pts: Ewodo 16; Rebs: Fankam 11; Asts: Green 6		Pts: Mwangale, Wanyama 12; Rebs: Wanyama 10; Asts: Mwangale, M. Otieno 3

Yaoundé Multipurpose Sports Complex, Yaoundé
Attendance: 1,000
Referees: Nadege Zouzou (CIV), Saber Rezgui (TUN), Haytham Ihaqaf (LBY)

19 September 2021
20:00

Boxscore

Kenya	61–58	Cape Verde
Scoring by quarter: 16–12, 12–21, 15–13, 18–12
Pts: Reynolds 17; Rebs: Wanyama 10; Asts: Mwangale 6		Pts: Jo. Vaz 18; Rebs: Jo. Vaz 12; Asts: Mendes, Jo. Vaz 3

Yaoundé Multipurpose Sports Complex, Yaoundé
Attendance: 1,000
Referees: Arbia Belghith (TUN), Nadege Zouzou (CIV), Nadjet Zenagui (ALG)

20 September 2021
17:00

Boxscore

Cape Verde	40–71	Cameroon
Scoring by quarter: 19–15, 6–15, 13–16, 2–25
Pts: Jo. Vaz 12; Rebs: Correia 7 Asts: Livramento 2		Pts: Nkoyock 17; Rebs: Guotué 10; Asts: Green 9

Yaoundé Multipurpose Sports Complex, Yaoundé
Attendance: 1,000
Referees: Aya Ahmed (EGY), Kouakou Niamien (CIV), Didier Gaga (RWA)

=== Group B ===
Pos	Team	Pld	W	L	PF	PA	PD	Pts	Qualification
1	Nigeria	2	2	0	152	115	+37	4	Quarterfinals
2	Angola	2	1	1	135	146	−11	3	Qualification to quarterfinals
3	Mozambique	2	0	2	111	137	−26	2	Qualification to quarterfinals

Source: FIBA
Rules for classification: 1) Points; 2) Head-to-head results; 3) Points difference; 4) Points scored.

18 September 2021
20:00

Boxscore

Nigeria	67–50	Mozambique
Scoring by quarter: 11–12, 18–21, 24–9, 14–8
Pts: Kalu 17; Rebs: Elonu 7 Asts: Kalu 5		Pts: Chiziane, Seda 12; Rebs: Mucauro 7 Asts: Cossa, Mucauro 3

Yaoundé Multipurpose Sports Complex, Yaoundé
Attendance: 1,000
Referees: Esperanza Mendoza (ESP), Sara El-Sharnouby (EGY), Walelign Gebeto (ETH)

19 September 2021
17:00

Boxscore

Mozambique	61–70	Angola
Scoring by quarter: 14–25, 14–14, 11–14, 22–17
Pts: Mucauro 16; Rebs: Seda 9 Asts: three players 3		Pts: Peso 17; Rebs: Peso 9 Asts: Matiquite 3

Yaoundé Multipurpose Sports Complex, Yaoundé
Attendance: 1,000
Referees: Kouakou Niemien (CIV), Andreia Silva (BRA), Aya Ahmed (EGY)

20 September 2021
20:00

Boxscore

Angola	65–85	Nigeria
Scoring by quarter: 18–31, 10–21, 19–15, 18–18
Pts: Matiquite 15; Rebs: Manuel 10; Asts: Lucas, Daniel 5		Pts: Kalu 12; Rebs: Ibekwe 8 Asts: Elonu 4

Yaoundé Multipurpose Sports Complex, Yaoundé
Attendance: 1,000
Referees: Sara El-Sharnouby (EGY), Arbia Belghith (TUN), Saber Rezgui (TUN)

=== Group C ===
Pos	Team	Pld	W	L	PF	PA	PD	Pts	Qualification
1	Senegal	2	2	0	178	94	+84	4	Quarterfinals
2	Egypt	2	1	1	165	136	+29	3	Qualification to quarterfinals
3	Guinea	2	0	2	89	202	−113	2	Qualification to quarterfinals

Source: FIBA
Rules for classification: 1) Points; 2) Head-to-head results; 3) Points difference; 4) Points scored.

18 September 2021
11:00

Boxscore

Senegal	100–31	Guinea
Scoring by quarter: 25–10, 23–9, 23–8, 29–4
Pts: Diop 19; Rebs: Diop 8 Asts: Diémé 8		Pts: Kaba 8 Rebs: Mara 4 Asts: Jallow, Mbaye 2

Yaoundé Multipurpose Sports Complex, Yaoundé
Attendance: 1,000
Referees: Monicca Nassuuna (UGA), Andreia Silva (BRA), Claudio Eiuba (ANG)

19 September 2021
11:00

Boxscore

Guinea	58–102	Egypt
Scoring by quarter: 18–20, 19–25, 9–33, 12–24
Pts: Mara 21; Rebs: Kaba 10; Asts: Mbaye 4		Pts: Mohamed 20; Rebs: Abdelalim 8 Asts: Moussa 7

Yaoundé Multipurpose Sports Complex, Yaoundé
Attendance: 1,000
Referees: Opeyemi Ogunleye (NGA), Dorothy Okatch (BOT), Jules Djopwouo (CMR)

20 September 2021
14:00

Boxscore

Egypt	63–78	Senegal
Scoring by quarter: 15–21, 10–18, 19–18, 19–21
Pts: Degheidy 16; Rebs: Amer, El-Gedawy 6 Asts: Degheidy 4		Pts: Diop, Niang 19; Rebs: Diarra 9 Asts: Diop 6

Yaoundé Multipurpose Sports Complex, Yaoundé
Attendance: 1,000
Referees: Walelign Gebeto (ETH), Opeyemi Ogunleye (NGA), Haytham Ihaqaf (LBY)

=== Group D ===
Pos	Team	Pld	W	L	PF	PA	PD	Pts	Qualification
1	Mali	2	2	0	177	102	+75	4	Quarterfinals
2	Ivory Coast	2	1	1	132	125	+7	3	Qualification to quarterfinals
3	Tunisia	2	0	2	88	170	−82	2	Qualification to quarterfinals

Source: FIBA
Rules for classification: 1) Points; 2) Head-to-head results; 3) Points difference; 4) Points scored.

18 September 2021
14:00

Boxscore

Mali	101–39	Tunisia
Scoring by quarter: 29–10, 24–10, 23–10, 25–9
Pts: N'Diaye 18; Rebs: Koné 11; Asts: K. Coulibaly 6		Pts: Loubiri 16; Rebs: Laouini 6 Asts: Shili 5

Yaoundé Multipurpose Sports Complex, Yaoundé
Attendance: 1,000
Referees: Dorothy Okatch (MLI), Yann Davidson (MAD), Jules Djopwouo (CMR)

19 September 2021
14:00

Boxscore

Tunisia	49–69	Ivory Coast
Scoring by quarter: 11–13, 13–22, 9–18, 16–16
Pts: Loubiri 17; Rebs: Shili 8 Asts: Baccar 3		Pts: Berté 20; Rebs: K. Kouyaté 17; Asts: K. Kouyaté, M. Kouyaté 3

Yaoundé Multipurpose Sports Complex, Yaoundé
Attendance: 1,000
Referees: Didier Gaga (RWA), Esperanza Mendoza (ESP), Monicca Nassuuna (UGA)

20 September 2021
11:00

Boxscore

Ivory Coast	63–76	Mali
Scoring by quarter: 20–24, 17–12, 17–15, 9–25
Pts: Loubiri 17; Rebs: Shili 8 Asts: Baccar 3		Pts: Berté 20; Rebs: K. Kouyaté 17; Asts: K. Kouyaté, M. Kouyaté 3

Yaoundé Multipurpose Sports Complex, Yaoundé
Attendance: 1,000
Referees: Didier Gaga (RWA), Esperanza Mendoza (ESP), Monicca Nassuuna (UGA)

== Knockout stage ==
=== Bracket ===
Qualification to QF
Egypt	85
Tunisia	36
Angola	82
Cape Verde	65
Ivory Coast	81
Guinea	50
Mozambique	72
Kenya	50

Quarterfinals
Cameroon	67
Egypt	61
Mali	74
Angola	53
Nigeria	72
Ivory Coast	56
Senegal	74
Mozambique	46

Semifinals
Cameroon	51
Mali	52
Nigeria	73
Senegal	62

Final
Mali	59
Nigeria	70
Third place game
Cameroon	53
Senegal	49

5th place bracket

5th–8th place semifinals
Egypt	82
Angola	76
Ivory Coast	57
Mozambique	59

Fifth place game
Egypt	62
Mozambique	69
Seventh place game
Angola	57
Ivory Coast	62

=== Qualification to quarterfinals ===
22 September 2021
11:00

Boxscore

Egypt	85–36	Tunisia
Scoring by quarter: 17–6, 20–17, 25–8, 22–5
Pts: Mohamed 20; Rebs: Amer 16; Asts: Moussa 6		Pts: Loubiri 11; Rebs: Hamrouni 10; Asts: Loubiri 2

Yaoundé Multipurpose Sports Complex, Yaoundé
Attendance: 1,000
Referees: Dorothy Okatch (BOT), Nadege Zouzou (CIV), Claudio Eiuba (ANG)

22 September 2021
14:00

Boxscore

Ivory Coast	81–50	Guinea
Scoring by quarter: 20–10, 22–15, 17–15, 22–10
Pts: Diawara 23; Rebs: Sieza 13; Asts: Amani 4		Pts: Jallow 12; Rebs: Diallo 8 Asts: three players 2

Yaoundé Multipurpose Sports Complex, Yaoundé
Attendance: 1,000
Referees: Aya Ahmed (EGY), Yann Davidson (MAD), Nadjet Zenagui (ALG)

22 September 2021
17:00

Boxscore

Kenya	50–72	Mozambique
Scoring by quarter: 12–24, 11–17, 10–16, 17–15
Pts: M. Otieno 10; Rebs: Akinyi 9 Asts: Mwangale 4		Pts: Mucauro 21; Rebs: Seda 9 Asts: Mucauro 7

Yaoundé Multipurpose Sports Complex, Yaoundé
Attendance: 1,000
Referees: Monicca Nassuuna (UGA), Esperanza Mendoza (ESP), Didier Gaga (RWA)

22 September 2021
20:00

Boxscore

Angola	82–65	Cape Verde
Scoring by quarter: 28–7, 16–24, 21–18, 17–16
Pts: Lucas 17; Rebs: Manuel 8 Asts: Lucas 7		Pts: Leitão 20; Rebs: Jo. Vaz 9 Asts: Jo. Vaz 5

Yaoundé Multipurpose Sports Complex, Yaoundé
Attendance: 1,000
Referees: Sara El-Sharnouby (EGY), Andreia Silva (BRA), Saber Rezgui (TUN)

=== Quarterfinals ===
23 September 2021
11:00

Boxscore

Nigeria	72–56	Ivory Coast
Scoring by quarter: 24–8, 19–13, 16–14, 13–21
Pts: Kalu 17; Rebs: Macaulay 7 Asts: Kalu 6		Pts: Berté 13; Rebs: Sieza 9 Asts: K. Kouyaté 3

Yaoundé Multipurpose Sports Complex, Yaoundé
Attendance: 1,000
Referees: Monicca Nassuuna (UGA), Didier Gaga (RWA), Aya Ahmed (EGY)

23 September 2021
14:00

Boxscore

Senegal	74–46	Mozambique
Scoring by quarter: 20–13, 17–9, 24–16, 13–8
Pts: Sy 17; Rebs: Diop 7 Asts: Diémé 7		Pts: Cossa 10; Rebs: Seda 10; Asts: Mucauro 3

Yaoundé Multipurpose Sports Complex, Yaoundé
Attendance: 1,000
Referees: Sara El-Sharnouby (EGY), Walelign Gebeto (ETH), Esperanza Mendoza (ESP)

23 September 2021
17:00

Boxscore

Cameroon	67–61	Egypt
Scoring by quarter: 20–25, 19–7, 11–14, 17–15
Pts: Effa 19; Rebs: Fankam 18; Asts: Green 7		Pts: El-Gedawy 19; Rebs: El-Gedawy 16; Asts: Moussa 6

Yaoundé Multipurpose Sports Complex, Yaoundé
Referees: Andreia Silva (BRA), Dorothy Okatch (BOT), Kouakou Niamien (CIV)

23 September 2021
20:00

Boxscore

Mali	74–53	Angola
Scoring by quarter: 20–7, 26–14, 18–9, 10–23
Pts: Koné, N'Diaye 14; Rebs: M. Coulibaly 14; Asts: Doumbia 4		Pts: Matiquite 15; Rebs: Peso 13; Asts: Daniel 3

Yaoundé Multipurpose Sports Complex, Yaoundé
Attendance: 1,000
Referees: Yann Davidson (MAD), Nadege Zouzou (CIV), Saber Rezgui (TUN)

=== 5th–8th place semifinals ===
24 September 2021
11:00

Boxscore

Ivory Coast	57–59	Mozambique
Scoring by quarter: 7–14, 19–19, 11–12, 20–14
Pts: Sahié 19; Rebs: Diawara 9 Asts: Sahié 3		Pts: Mucauro, Seda 13; Rebs: Mafanela 9 Asts: Mucauro 7

Yaoundé Multipurpose Sports Complex, Yaoundé
Attendance: 1,000
Referees: Saber Rezgui (TUN), Haytham Ihaqaf (LBY), Nadjet Zenagui (ALG)

24 September 2021
14:00

Boxscore

Egypt	82–76	Angola
Scoring by quarter: 17–13, 22–18, 18–22, 25–23
Pts: Mohamed 29; Rebs: El-Gedawy 10; Asts: Moussa 6		Pts: Matiquite 24; Rebs: Matiquite 10; Asts: three players 3

Yaoundé Multipurpose Sports Complex, Yaoundé
Attendance: 1,000
Referees: Jules Djopwouo (CMR), Kouakou Niamien (CIV), Didier Gaga (RWA)

=== Semifinals ===
24 September 2021
17:00

Boxscore

Cameroon	51–52	Mali
Scoring by quarter: 19–12, 7–11, 12–18, 13–11
Pts: Fankam 12; Rebs: Fankam 12; Asts: Green 3		Pts: N'Diaye 12; Rebs: K. Coulibaly 6 Asts: Koné 4

Yaoundé Multipurpose Sports Complex, Yaoundé
Attendance: 1,000
Referees: Monicca Nassuuna (UGA), Walelign Gebeto (ETH), Andreia Silva (BRA)

24 September 2021
20:00

Boxscore

Nigeria	73–62	Senegal
Scoring by quarter: 22–11, 23–20, 15–13, 13–19
Pts: Okonkwo 16; Rebs: Macaulay, Okonkwo 7 Asts: Kalu 5		Pts: Sy 18; Rebs: Diarra, Ndiaye 5 Asts: Diémé 5

Yaoundé Multipurpose Sports Complex, Yaoundé
Attendance: 1,000
Referees: Esperanza Mendoza (ESP), Nadege Zouzou (CIV), Sara El-Sharnouby (EGY)

=== Seventh place game ===
25 September 2021
13:00

Boxscore

Angola	57–62	Ivory Coast
Scoring by quarter: 13–18, 15–18, 17–11, 12–15
Pts: Peso 13; Rebs: Gala, Manuel 8 Asts: Pequeno 6		Pts: Berté 21; Rebs: K. Kouyaté, Sieza 7 Asts: three players 2

Yaoundé Multipurpose Sports Complex, Yaoundé
Attendance: 1,000
Referees: Aya Ahmed (EGY), Monicca Nassuuna (UGA), Didier Gaga (RWA)

=== Fifth place game ===
25 September 2021
16:00

Boxscore

Egypt	62–69	Mozambique
Scoring by quarter: 14–18, 8–20, 24–14, 16–17
Pts: Degheidy 24; Rebs: El-Gedawy 9 Asts: Degheidy 3		Pts: Mucauro 15; Rebs: Mafanela 18; Asts: Cossa 9

Yaoundé Multipurpose Sports Complex, Yaoundé
Attendance: 1,000
Referees: Opeyemi Ogunleye (NGA), Kouakou Niamien (CIV), Arbia Belghith (TUN)

=== Third place game ===
26 September 2021
15:00

Boxscore

Cameroon	53–49	Senegal
Scoring by quarter: 12–19, 10–8, 14–11, 17–11
Pts: Effa 15; Rebs: Fankam 6 Asts: three players 2		Pts: Diémé 12; Rebs: Diarra, Diémé 6 Asts: Diémé 5

Yaoundé Multipurpose Sports Complex, Yaoundé
Attendance: 1,000
Referees: Sara El-Sharnouby (EGY), Dorothy Okatch (BOT), Walelign Gebeto (ETH)

=== Final ===
26 September 2021
18:00

Boxscore

Mali	59–70	Nigeria
Scoring by quarter: 11–22, 13–9, 14–28, 21–11
Pts: M. Coulibaly 13; Rebs: Koné 11; Asts: N'Diaye 4		Pts: Macaulay 15; Rebs: Ibekwe 10; Asts: Kalu 4

Yaoundé Multipurpose Sports Complex, Yaoundé
Attendance: 1,000
Referees: Monicca Nassuuna (UGA), Nadege Zouzou (CIV), Andreia Silva (BRA)

== Final standings ==
Rank	Team	Record
1st place, gold medalist(s)	Nigeria	5–0
2nd place, silver medalist(s)	Mali	4–1
3rd place, bronze medalist(s)	Cameroon	4–1
4	Senegal	3–2
5	Mozambique	3–3
6	Egypt	3–3
7	Ivory Coast	3–3
8	Angola	2–4
9	Kenya	1–2
10	Cape Verde	0–3
11	Tunisia	0–3
12	Guinea	0–3

Qualified for the 2022 FIBA Women's Basketball World Cup Qualifying Tournament

== Statistics and awards ==
=== Statistical leaders ===
==== Players ====
Points

Name	PPG
(Egypt) Nadine Mohamed	16.8
(Cape Verde) Joseana Vaz	16.0
(Egypt) Soraya Degheidy	15.2
(Mali) Djeneba N'Diaye	15.2
(Ivory Coast) Laetitia Sahié	15.0

Rebounds

Name	RPG
(Cameroon) Dulcy Fankam	9.6
(Mali) Mariam Coulibaly	9.0
(Mozambique) Tamara Seda	8.7
(Mali) Sika Koné	8.6
(Egypt) Raneem El-Gedawy	8.2
(Mozambique) Odélia Mafanela	8.2

Assists

Name	APG
(Senegal) Bintou Diémé	5.8
(Cameroon) Alexandra Green	5.2
(Egypt) Reem Moussa	5.0
(Nigeria) Ezinne Kalu	4.6
(Kenya) Natalie Mwangale	4.3

Blocks

Name	BPG
(Egypt) Hala El-Shaarawy	1.8
(Nigeria) Victoria Macaulay	1.8
(Guinea) Masseny Kaba	1.7
(Kenya) Mercy Wanyama	1.7
(Senegal) Maimouna Diarra	1.6

Steals

Name	SPG
(Cape Verde) Joseana Vaz	3.7
(Ivory Coast) Kani Kouyaté	3.3
(Mozambique) Ingvild Mucauro	3.3
(Mali) Djeneba N'Diaye	3.2
(Guinea) Aicha Mara	2.7
(Kenya) Christine Akinyi	2.7

Efficiency

Name	EFFPG
(Mali) Mariam Coulibaly	18.6
(Cameroon) Dulcy Fankam	15.0
(Mozambique) Ingvild Mucauro	14.8
(Nigeria) Victoria Macaula	14.6
(Egypt) Raneem El-Gedawy	14.5
(Egypt) Nadine Mohamed	14.5

==== Teams ====
Points

Team	PPG
Egypt	75.8
Nigeria	73.4
Senegal	72.8
Mali	72.4
Angola	67.2

Rebounds

Team	RPG
Mali	53.4
Cameroon	48.0
Nigeria	46.0
Angola	45.3
Ivory Coast	45.2

Assists

Team	APG
Mali	19.2
Senegal	18.4
Nigeria	17.2
Mozambique	15.8
Egypt	15.5

Blocks

Team	BPG
Senegal	6.0
Nigeria	5.8
Egypt	4.0
Mali	3.4
Ivory Coast	3.3
Kenya	3.3

Steals

Team	SPG
Ivory Coast	14.2
Senegal	14.2
Kenya	12.0
Mozambique	11.2
Mali	10.6

Efficiency

Team	EFFPG
Senegal	85.8
Mali	79.8
Nigeria	78.2
Egypt	77.3
Cameroon	67.0

=== Awards ===
The awards were announced on 26 September 2021.

All-Star team
Guards	Forwards	Center
(Nigeria) Ezinne Kalu	(Cameroon) Marina Ewodo (Nigeria) Adaora Elonu (Senegal) Yacine Diop	(Mali) Mariam Coulibaly
MVP: (Nigeria) Adaora Elonu
