= 2021 FIBA Women's AfroBasket qualification =

The 2021 FIBA Women's AfroBasket qualification occurred on various dates in 2021 to determine which African national basketball teams would qualify for the 2021 FIBA Women's AfroBasket. Teams competed with other teams in their respective zones for a spot in the championship tournament.

== Zone 1 ==
Four teams were scheduled to compete, but Algeria, Morocco and Libya withdrew before the tournament, so the original host Tunisia qualified.

== Zone 2 ==
Two teams played a home-and away series to determine the qualified team.

=== Overview ===
| Team 1 | Agg. | Team 2 | 1st leg | 2nd leg |
|---|---|---|---|---|
| Guinea | 124–132 | Cape Verde | 65–64 | 59–68 |

=== Results ===
27 June 2021

| Guinea | 65–64 | Cape Verde |

Conakry

28 June 2021

| Cape Verde | 68–59 | Guinea |

Conakry, Guinea

== Zone 3 ==
Six teams were scheduled to compete, but Ghana, Togo, Benin, Niger and Burkina Faso did not register for the tournament, so Ivory Coast qualified.

== Zone 5 ==
Four teams played a round robin to determine the qualified team. It was held in Kigali, Rwanda between 14 and 17 July 2021. Kenya became the champions after defeating Egypt 99–83 in the final.

=== Preliminary round ===
| Pos | Team | Pld | W | L | PF | PA | PD | Pts | Qualification |
|---|---|---|---|---|---|---|---|---|---|
| 1 | Egypt | 3 | 3 | 0 | 273 | 230 | +43 | 6 | Semi Final 1 |
| 2 | Rwanda (H) | 3 | 2 | 1 | 201 | 168 | +33 | 5 | Semi Final 2 |
| 3 | Kenya | 3 | 1 | 2 | 217 | 232 | −15 | 4 | Semi Final 2 |
| 4 | South Sudan | 3 | 0 | 3 | 165 | 226 | −61 | 3 | Semi Final 1 |

Source: FIBA
Rules for classification: 1) Points; 2) Head-to-head; 3) Points difference; 4) Points scored.
(H) Hosts

| 12 July 2021 | South Sudan | 65–95 | Egypt | Kigali |
| 15:00 | Scoring by quarter: 19–36, 23–20, 14–24, 9–15 |
| | | Boxscore | | Arena: BK Arena |

| 12 July 2021 | Rwanda | 77–45 | Kenya | Kigali |
| 18:00 |
| | | Boxscore | | Arena: BK Arena |

| 13 July 2021 | Kenya | 66–48 | South Sudan | Kigali |
| 15:00 |
| | | Boxscore | | Arena: BK Arena |

| 13 July 2021 | Rwanda | 59–71 | Egypt | Kigali |
| 18:00 |
| | | Boxscore | | Arena: BK Arena |

| 14 July 2021 | Egypt | 107–106 | Kenya | Kigali |
| 15:00 |
| | | Boxscore | | Arena: BK Arena |

| 14 July 2021 | South Sudan | 52–65 | Rwanda | Kigali |
| 18:00 |
| | | Boxscore | | Arena: BK Arena |

=== Semi-finals ===
| 16 July 2021 | Egypt | 99–65 | South Sudan | Kigali |
| 15:00 |
| | | Boxscore | | Arena: BK Arena |

| 16 July 2021 | Rwanda | 52–79 | Kenya | Kigali |
| 18:00 |
| | | Boxscore | | Arena: BK Arena |

=== Third place game ===
| 17 July 2021 | South Sudan | 56–83 | Rwanda | Kigali |
| 15:00 |
| | | Boxscore | | Arena: BK Arena |

=== Final ===
| 17 July 2021 | Egypt | 83–99 | Kenya | Kigali |
| 18:00 |
| | | Boxscore | | Arena: BK Arena |

== Zone 6 ==
Three teams were scheduled to compete, but Botswana and Zimbabwe did not register for the tournament, so Angola qualified.
