= Basketball at the 2020 Summer Olympics – Women's qualification =

Twelve teams qualified for the women's basketball at the 2020 Summer Olympics tournament (postponed to 2021 due to the COVID-19 pandemic). The host nation and the 2018 World Cup winner qualified. Those two teams, however, had to play in the pre-qualifying and qualifying tournaments and took one of the qualifying spots from those tournaments. Thus, while two of the World Qualifying Tournaments provided quota spots to their three top teams, the other two tournaments provided quota spots only to the top two teams plus either the host nation or the World Cup winner.

Teams had to qualify for the Women's Olympic Qualifying Tournaments through Women's EuroBasket or Pre-Olympic Qualifying Tournaments (which themselves must be qualified for through Continental Cups).

== Qualification ==
The cities of Ostend, Bourges, Belgrade, and Foshan had been awarded the hosting rights of the four FIBA Women's Olympic Qualifying Tournaments, from 6 to 9 February 2020. However, the Foshan tournament was moved to Belgrade due to concerns over the COVID-19 pandemic.

Means of qualification	Date	Venue	Berths	Qualified
Host nation	—	—	1	Japan
2018 FIBA Women's Basketball World Cup	22–30 September 2018	Spain	1	United States
2020 FIBA Women's Olympic Qualifying Tournaments	6–9 February 2020	(Belgium) Ostend	2	Belgium
2020 FIBA Women's Olympic Qualifying Tournaments	6–9 February 2020	(Belgium) Ostend	2	Canada
2020 FIBA Women's Olympic Qualifying Tournaments	6–9 February 2020	(France) Bourges	3	Australia
2020 FIBA Women's Olympic Qualifying Tournaments	6–9 February 2020	(France) Bourges	3	France
2020 FIBA Women's Olympic Qualifying Tournaments	6–9 February 2020	(France) Bourges	3	Puerto Rico
2020 FIBA Women's Olympic Qualifying Tournaments	6–9 February 2020	(Serbia) Belgrade	2	Nigeria
2020 FIBA Women's Olympic Qualifying Tournaments	6–9 February 2020	(Serbia) Belgrade	2	Serbia
2020 FIBA Women's Olympic Qualifying Tournaments	6–9 February 2020	(Serbia) Belgrade	3	China
2020 FIBA Women's Olympic Qualifying Tournaments	6–9 February 2020	(Serbia) Belgrade	3	South Korea
2020 FIBA Women's Olympic Qualifying Tournaments	6–9 February 2020	(Serbia) Belgrade	3	Spain
Total			12	

== Pre-qualifying tournaments ==
=== Europe ===
==== EuroBasket ====
The top six teams in EuroBasket Women 2019 qualified directly to the WOQTs.

Rank	Team	Record
Gold medal	Spain	6–0
Silver medal	France	5–1
Bronze medal	Serbia	5–1
4th	Great Britain	4–3
Eliminated in the quarterfinals
5th	Belgium	3–3
6th	Sweden	3–3
7th	Hungary	2–3
8th	Russia	2–4
Eliminated in the qualification for quarterfinals
9th	Italy	2–2
10th	Slovenia	1–3
11th	Latvia	1–3
12th	Montenegro	1–3
Eliminated in the first round
13th	Belarus	1–2
14th	Turkey	1–2
15th	Czech Republic	1–2
16th	Ukraine	0–3

=== Africa ===
==== Africa pre-qualifying tournament ====
The top six teams from the 2019 Women's Afrobasket played in the Africa pre-qualifying tournament from 14 to 17 November 2019. The top two teams in the PQT advanced to the WOQTs. The tournament was held in Mozambique.

All times are local (UTC+2).

===== Preliminary round =====
The draw was held on 18 August 2019.

====== Group A ======
Pos	Team	Pld	W	L	PF	PA	PD	Pts	Qualification
1	Nigeria	1	1	0	57	48	+9	2	Semifinals
2	Mozambique (H)	1	0	1	48	57	−9	1	Semifinals
3	DR Congo (Note: DR Congo was disqualified after failing to show up to either of their games. All results were nullified.)	0	0	0	0	0	0	0	Disqualified

Source: FIBA
Rules for classification: 1) Points; 2) Head-to-head results; 3) Points difference; 4) Points scored.
(H) Hosts
Notes:

16 November 2019
18:00

Boxscore

Mozambique	48–57	Nigeria
Scoring by quarter: 8–21, 11–17, 16–8, 13–11
Pts: Dongue 26; Rebs: Dongue 6 Asts: Pereira 4		Pts: Elonu 12; Rebs: Akhator 12; Asts: Kalu 3

Pavilhão do Maxaquene, Maputo

====== Group B ======
Pos	Team	Pld	W	L	PF	PA	PD	Pts	Qualification
1	Senegal	2	2	0	133	124	+9	4	Semifinals
2	Mali	2	1	1	118	103	+15	3	Semifinals
3	Angola	2	0	2	116	140	−24	2	

Source: FIBA
Rules for classification: 1) Points; 2) Head-to-head results; 3) Points difference; 4) Points scored.

14 November 2019
18:00

Boxscore

Senegal	75–71	Angola
Scoring by quarter: 14–22, 20–16, 26–18, 15–15
Pts: Diémé 18; Rebs: Diémé 6 Asts: Diémé 6		Pts: Jorge 19; Rebs: Lucas 7 Asts: Jorge, Lucas 4

Pavilhão do Maxaquene, Maputo

15 November 2019
15:30

Boxscore

Angola	45–65	Mali
Scoring by quarter: 13–20, 5–9, 20–24, 7–12
Pts: Daniel 9 Rebs: Paulo 10; Asts: Lucas 3		Pts: M. Coulibaly 21; Rebs: K. Coulibaly, Maiga 6 Asts: three players 3

Pavilhão do Maxaquene, Maputo

16 November 2019
15:30

Boxscore

Mali	53–58	Senegal
Scoring by quarter: 9–15, 15–13, 15–19, 14–11
Pts: K. Coulibaly 14; Rebs: K. Coulibaly, M. Coulibaly 6 Asts: Gandega 4		Pts: Sy-Diop 16; Rebs: Diarra 8 Asts: Diémé 4

Pavilhão do Maxaquene, Maputo

====== Semifinals ======
There were no final played. The two winners of the semifinals advanced to the Olympic Qualifying tournament.

17 November 2019
15:30

Boxscore

Nigeria	74–59	Mali
Scoring by quarter: 14–11, 20–14, 25–14, 15–20
Pts: Kalu 15; Rebs: Kalu 7 Asts: Elonu 5		Pts: Tireira 20; Rebs: M. Coulibaly 12; Asts: Gandega 3

Pavilhão do Maxaquene, Maputo

17 November 2019
18:00

Boxscore

Senegal	49–56	Mozambique
Scoring by quarter: 10–9, 8–17, 14–8, 17–22
Pts: Sarr 15; Rebs: Sy 6 Asts: Diémé 5		Pts: Mucauro 12; Rebs: Henriques, Mucauro 7 Asts: Zita 5

Pavilhão do Maxaquene, Maputo

=== Americas ===
==== Americas pre-qualifying tournaments ====
The top eight teams in the 2019 FIBA Women's AmeriCup played in two Americas pre-qualifying tournaments, with four teams in each tournament. The top two teams in each PQT advanced to the WOQTs.

The draw was held on 30 September 2019. Canada and Argentina each hosted one tournament.

===== Group A =====
Pos	Team	Pld	W	L	PF	PA	PD	Pts	Qualification
1	Canada (H)	3	3	0	304	193	+111	6	2020 WOQT
2	Puerto Rico	3	2	1	271	223	+48	5	2020 WOQT
3	Cuba	3	1	2	204	261	−57	4	
4	Dominican Republic	3	0	3	186	288	−102	3	

Source: FIBA
Rules for classification: 1) Points; 2) Head-to-head results; 3) Points difference; 4) Points scored.
(H) Hosts

All times are local (UTC−7).

14 November 2019
17:00

Boxscore

Dominican Republic	58–108	Puerto Rico
Scoring by quarter: 9–35, 13–32, 15–18, 21–23
Pts: Marte 13; Rebs: Monsac, Reynoso 7 Asts: De los Ángeles, Evangelista 2		Pts: Quiñones 20; Rebs: Gibson, Quiñones 7 Asts: Rosado, Salamán 6

Edmonton Expo Centre, Edmonton
Referees: Marcos Benito (BRA), Juan Fernández (ARG), Fernando Leite (BRA)

14 November 2019
19:30

Boxscore

Canada	110–53	Cuba
Scoring by quarter: 28–15, 25–17, 33–7, 24–14
Pts: Nurse 28; Rebs: Achonwa 8 Asts: Pellington 7		Pts: Amargo, Galindo 12; Rebs: Becquer 7 Asts: Ávila, Martínez 3

Edmonton Expo Centre, Edmonton
Referees: Leandro Lezcano (ARG), Krishna Domínguez (MEX), Grant Todey (USA)

16 November 2019
14:30

Boxscore

Cuba	70–68	Dominican Republic
Scoring by quarter: 14–20, 16–13, 22–17, 18–18
Pts: Galindo 25; Rebs: Galindo 9 Asts: Amargo, Martínez 6		Pts: Monsac 25; Rebs: Monsac 8 Asts: Evangelista 3

Edmonton Expo Centre, Edmonton
Referees: Juan Fernández (ARG), Julio Anaya (PAN), Grant Todey (USA)

16 November 2019
17:00

Boxscore

Puerto Rico	80–84	Canada
Scoring by quarter: 15–16, 12–17, 30–26, 23–25
Pts: O'Neill 21; Rebs: Lozada-Cabbage 9 Asts: O'Neill 4		Pts: Raincock-Ekunwe 27; Rebs: Raincock-Ekunwe 11; Asts: Achonwa 4

Edmonton Expo Centre, Edmonton
Referees: Marcos Benito (BRA), Leandro Lezcano (ARG), Fernando Leite (BRA)

17 November 2019
13:30

Boxscore

Cuba	81–83	Puerto Rico
Scoring by quarter: 18–23, 21–16, 17–19, 25–25
Pts: Ávila, Galindo 23; Rebs: Ávila 12; Asts: three players 3		Pts: Rosado 17; Rebs: Lozada-Cabbage 14; Asts: O'Neill 5

Edmonton Expo Centre, Edmonton
Referees: Marcos Benito (BRA), Juan Fernández (ARG), Krishna Domínguez (MEX)

17 November 2019
16:00

Boxscore

Dominican Republic	60–110	Canada
Scoring by quarter: 15–31, 14–32, 13–30, 18–17
Pts: Hernández 23; Rebs: Marte 5 Asts: Frias 3		Pts: Hill 16; Rebs: Edwards 7 Asts: Raincock-Ekunwe 5

Edmonton Expo Centre, Edmonton
Referees: Leandro Lezcano (ARG), Julio Anaya (PAN), Fernando Leite (BRA)

===== Group B =====
Pos	Team	Pld	W	L	PF	PA	PD	Pts	Qualification
1	United States (Note: The USA were already qualified as the reigning World Champions.)	3	3	0	271	143	+128	6	
2	Brazil	3	2	1	199	164	+35	5	2020 WOQT
3	Colombia	3	1	2	148	228	−80	4	
4	Argentina (H)	3	0	3	152	235	−83	3	

Source: FIBA
Rules for classification: 1) Points; 2) Head-to-head results; 3) Points difference; 4) Points scored.
(H) Hosts
Notes:

All times are local (UTC−3).

14 November 2019
18:30

Boxscore

Brazil	61–76	United States
Scoring by quarter: 15–10, 16–23, 12–21, 18–22
Pts: Dantas, De Souza 11; Rebs: De Souza 12; Asts: Costa, Teixeira 5		Pts: Fowles, Gray 21; Rebs: Fowles 6 Asts: Gray 8

Dow Center, Bahía Blanca
Referees: Nathaniel Saunders (CAN), Daniel García (VEN), Sebastián Negrón (CHI)

14 November 2019
21:00

Boxscore

Colombia	67–63	Argentina
Scoring by quarter: 20–14, 18–14, 10–21, 19–14
Pts: Martínez 23; Rebs: Vente 9 Asts: Ríos 6		Pts: Burani 29; Rebs: Burani 10; Asts: González, Santana 6

Dow Center, Bahía Blanca
Referees: Daniel García (VEN), Alexis Mercado (PUR), Maripier Malo (CAN)

16 November 2019
18:30

Boxscore

Colombia	33–61	Brazil
Scoring by quarter: 4–13, 4–17, 15–14, 10–17
Pts: Ríos 15; Rebs: Ríos 6 Asts: Muñoz 2		Pts: Dantas, Teixeira 10; Rebs: Dos Santos 11; Asts: Costa 6

Dow Center, Bahía Blanca
Referees: Andrés Bartel (URU), Nathaniel Saunders (CAN), Alexis Mercado (PUR)

16 November 2019
21:00

Boxscore

United States	91–34	Argentina
Scoring by quarter: 19–9, 25–4, 26–8, 21–13
Pts: DeShields, Fowles 13; Rebs: Collier 12; Asts: Gray 6		Pts: Boquete 9 Rebs: Santana 6 Asts: De La Barba 4

Dow Center, Bahía Blanca
Referees: Maripier Malo (CAN), Daniel García (VEN), Carlos Peralta (ECU)

17 November 2019
18:30

Boxscore

United States	104–48	Colombia
Scoring by quarter: 20–14, 20–13, 26–9, 38–12
Pts: Wilson 23; Rebs: DeShields, Wilson 9 Asts: Diggins-Smith 9		Pts: Ríos 15; Rebs: Paz 6 Asts: Ríos 3

Dow Center, Bahía Blanca
Referees: Maripier Malo (CAN), Daniel García (VEN), Sebastián Negrón (CHI)

17 November 2019
21:00

Boxscore

Argentina	55–77	Brazil
Scoring by quarter: 17–17, 20–29, 4–14, 14–17
Pts: Boquete 13; Rebs: Boquete 5 Asts: Burani 4		Pts: Dantas 26; Rebs: Dantas 13; Asts: Costa 6

Dow Center, Bahía Blanca
Referees: Andrés Bartel (URU), Nathaniel Saunders (CAN), Carlos Peralta (ECU)

=== Asia/Oceania ===
==== Asia/Oceania pre-qualifying tournaments ====
The eight teams which took part in the 2019 FIBA Women's Asia Cup, including Olympic host Japan, played in two Asia/Oceania pre-qualifying tournaments, with four teams in each tournament. For the tournament in which Japan plays, Japan and the best other team advanced to the WOQTs. For the other tournament, the top two teams advanced.

The 2019 FIBA Women's Asia Cup was planned to have two divisions, Division A and B. Under the original set-up, only the top seven teams of Division A and the top team of Division B would have advanced to the Asia/Oceania qualifiers. However, Division B of was not held since there was no nation willing to host the tournament, and India which placed last in the FIBA Women's Asia Cup were given a slot in the Asia/Oceania qualifiers.

The draw was held on 28 September 2019. The tournaments were held in New Zealand and Malaysia.

===== Group A =====
Pos	Team	Pld	W	L	PF	PA	PD	Pts	Qualification
1	China	3	2	1	301	201	+100	5 (Note: China 3 Pts, +22 PD; South Korea 3 Pts, −3 PD; New Zealand 3 Pts, −19 PD)	2020 WOQT
2	South Korea	3	2	1	260	224	+36	5	2020 WOQT
3	New Zealand (H)	3	2	1	251	213	+38	5	
4	Philippines	3	0	3	178	352	−174	3	

Source: FIBA
Rules for classification: 1) Points; 2) Head-to-head results; 3) Points difference; 4) Points scored.
(H) Hosts
Notes:

All times are local (UTC+13).

14 November 2019
17:00

Boxscore

South Korea	81–80	China
Scoring by quarter: 25–17, 23–24, 18–15, 15–24
Pts: Park J. 23; Rebs: Park J. 8 Asts: Kim H., Kim J. 4		Pts: Li Yue. 15; Rebs: five players 6 Asts: Shao 7

The Trusts Arena, Auckland
Referees: Michael Aylen (AUS), Takaki Kato (JPN), Yevgeniy Mikheyev (KAZ)

14 November 2019
19:30

Boxscore

New Zealand	111–54	Philippines
Scoring by quarter: 24–17, 36–11, 23–19, 28–7
Pts: Boagni, Davidson 16; Rebs: Davidson 11; Asts: Boagni, Leger-Walker 7		Pts: Bernardino 17; Rebs: Danielle Animam 8 Asts: four players 2

The Trusts Arena, Auckland
Referees: Rabah Noujaim (LBN), Vaughan Mayberry (AUS), Watcharin Padungratchadakit (THA)

16 November 2019
15:10

Boxscore

Philippines	75–114	South Korea
Scoring by quarter: 12–34, 21–29, 15–28, 27–23
Pts: Bernardino 19; Rebs: Bernardino 8 Asts: Cabinbin, Hayes 4		Pts: Kang L. 16; Rebs: three players 9 Asts: Shin 5

The Trusts Arena, Auckland
Referees: Takaki Kato (JPN), Rabah Noujaim (LBN), Yevgeniy Mikheyev (KAZ)

16 November 2019
17:30

Boxscore

China	94–71	New Zealand
Scoring by quarter: 28–14, 22–15, 19–19, 25–23
Pts: Li M. 18; Rebs: Li Yue. 7 Asts: Li Yua. 6		Pts: Purcell 21; Rebs: Davidson 8 Asts: Cocks, Purcell 4

The Trusts Arena, Auckland
Referees: Vaughan Mayberry (AUS), Michael Aylen (AUS), Imran Ali Baig (IND)

17 November 2019
15:10

Boxscore

Philippines	49–127	China
Scoring by quarter: 10–36, 13–33, 11–34, 15–24
Pts: Pontejos 16; Rebs: three players 3 Asts: Castillo 3		Pts: Han 26; Rebs: Gao 14; Asts: Pan 8

The Trusts Arena, Auckland
Referees: Michael Aylen (AUS), Takaki Kato (JPN), Watcharin Padungratchadakit (THA)

17 November 2019
17:30

Boxscore

South Korea	65–69	New Zealand
Scoring by quarter: 8–21, 20–16, 22–18, 15–14
Pts: Kang L. 21; Rebs: Park J. 11; Asts: Park J. 6		Pts: Davidson 24; Rebs: Davidson 15; Asts: Purcell 6

The Trusts Arena, Auckland
Referees: Rabah Noujaim (LBN), Vaughan Mayberry (AUS), Imran Ali Baig (IND)

===== Group B =====
Pos	Team	Pld	W	L	PF	PA	PD	Pts	Qualification
1	Japan (Note: Japan was already qualified as the host nation of the 2020 Olympics.)	3	3	0	285	155	+130	6	
2	Australia	3	2	1	267	162	+105	5	2020 WOQT
3	Chinese Taipei	3	1	2	187	223	−36	4	
4	India	3	0	3	114	313	−199	3	

Source: FIBA
Rules for classification: 1) Points; 2) Head-to-head results; 3) Points difference; 4) Points scored.
Notes:

All times are local (UTC+8).

14 November 2019
17:00

Boxscore

Australia	84–51	Chinese Taipei
Scoring by quarter: 26–9, 22–13, 24–11, 12–18
Pts: Cambage 16; Rebs: George 9 Asts: O'Hea 6		Pts: three players 9 Rebs: Lin Y., Wang 4 Asts: Lin Y. 4

MABA Stadium, Kuala Lumpur
Referees: Hwang In-tae (KOR), Anton Kozlov (KAZ), Joenard Garcia (PHI)

14 November 2019
20:00

Boxscore

Japan	120–29	India
Scoring by quarter: 32–8, 39–8, 24–9, 25–4
Pts: Miyashita 21; Rebs: Umezawa 9 Asts: Yoshida 11		Pts: Nixon 8 Rebs: Kumari, Udayakumar 4 Asts: Jeena 3

MABA Stadium, Kuala Lumpur
Referees: Dallas Pickering (NZL), Yu Jung (TPE), Chan Owe Shiong (MAS)

16 November 2019
17:00

Boxscore

India	29–114	Australia
Scoring by quarter: 3–36, 8–21, 6–31, 12–26
Pts: Arvind 7 Rebs: Udayakumar 7 Asts: Geetha, Kumari 2		Pts: Allen 20; Rebs: Magbegor 9 Asts: Talbot 7

MABA Stadium, Kuala Lumpur
Referees: Yu Jung (TPE), Yuen Chun Yip (HKG), Joenard Garcia (PHI)

16 November 2019
20:00

Boxscore

Chinese Taipei	57–83	Japan
Scoring by quarter: 7–13, 11–21, 12–30, 27–19
Pts: Lin Y. 14; Rebs: Wang 9 Asts: three players 2		Pts: Tokashiki 17; Rebs: Miyazawa 11; Asts: Miyazawa 5

MABA Stadium, Kuala Lumpur
Referees: Dallas Pickering (NZL), Hwang In-tae (KOR), Chan Owe Shiong (MAS)

17 November 2019
15:00

Boxscore

Chinese Taipei	79–56	India
Scoring by quarter: 22–10, 25–19, 24–12, 8–15
Pts: Chen 20; Rebs: Tsai 11; Asts: Huang F. 6		Pts: Jeena 15; Rebs: Udayakumar 11; Asts: Limaye 6

MABA Stadium, Kuala Lumpur
Referees: Dallas Pickering (NZL), Joenard Garcia (PHI), Anton Kozlov (KAZ)

17 November 2019
18:00

Boxscore

Japan	82–69	Australia
Scoring by quarter: 30–16, 17–18, 17–19, 18–16
Pts: Motohashi 16; Rebs: Miyazawa 12; Asts: Motohashi 7		Pts: Cambage 17; Rebs: three players 6 Asts: O'Hea 7

MABA Stadium, Kuala Lumpur
Referees: Hwang In-tae (KOR), Yu Jung (TPE), Yuen Chun Yip (HKG)

== Olympic Qualifying Tournaments ==
=== Qualification for WOQTs ===
There was a pre-qualifying process for the WOQTs. European teams had to finish in the top six of EuroBasket, while teams from the Americas, Asia (including Oceania), and Africa played in pre-qualifying tournaments. 16 total teams qualified for the WOQTs. The Olympic host (Japan) and the World Cup winner (United States) automatically qualified for the WOQTs, each taking a spot from their respective continent.

Means of qualification	Date	Venue	Berths	Qualified
EuroBasket Women 2019	27 June–7 July 2019	Serbia; Latvia	6	Great Britain
EuroBasket Women 2019	27 June–7 July 2019	Serbia; Latvia	6	Spain
EuroBasket Women 2019	27 June–7 July 2019	Serbia; Latvia	6	France
EuroBasket Women 2019	27 June–7 July 2019	Serbia; Latvia	6	Serbia
EuroBasket Women 2019	27 June–7 July 2019	Serbia; Latvia	6	Belgium
EuroBasket Women 2019	27 June–7 July 2019	Serbia; Latvia	6	Sweden
Africa pre-qualifying tournament	14–17 November 2019	Mozambique	2	Nigeria
Africa pre-qualifying tournament	14–17 November 2019	Mozambique	2	Mozambique
Americas pre-qualifying tournaments	14–17 November 2019	Argentina	2	United States
Americas pre-qualifying tournaments	14–17 November 2019	Argentina	2	Brazil
Americas pre-qualifying tournaments	14–17 November 2019	Canada	2	Canada
Americas pre-qualifying tournaments	14–17 November 2019	Canada	2	Puerto Rico
Asia/Oceania Pre-qualifying tournaments	14–17 November 2019	Malaysia	2	Japan
Asia/Oceania Pre-qualifying tournaments	14–17 November 2019	Malaysia	2	Australia
Asia/Oceania Pre-qualifying tournaments	14–17 November 2019	New Zealand	2	China
Asia/Oceania Pre-qualifying tournaments	14–17 November 2019	New Zealand	2	South Korea
Total			16	
