= 2019 FIBA Women's AfroBasket qualification =

The 2019 FIBA Women's AfroBasket qualification occurred on various dates in 2019. It determined which African national basketball teams would qualify for the 2019 FIBA Women's AfroBasket. Teams competed against other teams in their respective zones for a spot in the Championship tournament.

== Qualified Teams ==
Five teams qualified for the tournament before the qualification round took place. Seven more teams claimed spots in the tournament through Zonal Qualifying.

| Event | Date | Location | Vacancies | Qualified |
|---|---|---|---|---|
| Host Nation | 7 June 2019 | (Ivory Coast) Abidjan | 1 | Senegal |
| 2017 Women's AfroBasket semi-finalists | 18–27 August 2017 | (Mali) Bamako | 3 | Nigeria; Mali; Mozambique |
| 2019 Women's AfroBasket Qualification Zone 1 | 25 July 2019 (Cancelled) | (Tunisia) Tunis | 1 | Tunisia |
| 2019 Women's AfroBasket Qualification Zone 2 | 17–19 May 2019 | (Cape Verde) Praia | 1 | Cape Verde |
| 2019 Women's AfroBasket Qualification Zone 3 | | N/A | 1 | Ivory Coast |
| 2019 Women's AfroBasket Qualification Zone 4 | 4–5 May 2019 | (Cameroon) Yaoundé | 1 | Cameroon |
| 2019 Women's AfroBasket Qualification Zone 5 | 26 June – 1 July 2019 | Uganda | 1 | Egypt |
| 2019 Women's AfroBasket Qualification Zone 6 | 6–8 June 2019 | (Zimbabwe) Harare | 1 | Angola |
| 2019 Women's AfroBasket Qualification Wildcard | | (Ivory Coast) Abidjan | 2 | DR Congo; Kenya |
| Total | | | 12 | |

== Zones ==
=== Zone 1 ===
- Tunisia

=== Zone 2 ===
A regional tournament was held from 17 to 19 May 2019 in Praia, Cape Verde. Despite losing the first game, Cape Verde qualified on aggregate 108–98.

17 May 2019

| Cape Verde | 48–50 | Guinea |
Scoring by quarter: 14–16, 13–8, 12–12, 9–14

Praia, Cape Verde

19 May 2019

| Guinea | 48–60 | Cape Verde |
Scoring by quarter: 10–15, 13–19, 16–12, 9–14

Praia, Cape Verde

=== Zone 3 ===
- Ivory Coast

=== Zone 4 ===
A regional tournament was held from 4 to 5 May 2019 in Yaoundé, Cameroon. After winning the two games against DR Congo, Cameroon earned its qualification for the 2019 FIBA Women's AfroBasket.

4 May 2019

| Cameroon | 91–46 | DR Congo |
Scoring by quarter: 25–9, 21–5, 20–15, 25–17

Yaoundé, Cameroon

5 May 2019

| DR Congo | 66–70 | Cameroon |
Scoring by quarter: 14–17, 27–9, 16–18, 9–26

Yaoundé, Cameroon

=== Zone 5 ===
A regional tournament was held from 26 June to 1 July 2019 in Kampala, Uganda. Uganda, Egypt, Kenya and Rwanda participated in this tournament. Egypt earned its qualification for the 2019 FIBA Women's AfroBasket.

==== Group phase ====
| Pos | Team | Pld | W | L | PF | PA | PD | Pts |
|---|---|---|---|---|---|---|---|---|
| 1 | Egypt | 3 | 3 | 0 | 214 | 193 | +21 | 6 |
| 2 | Uganda | 3 | 2 | 1 | 183 | 163 | +20 | 5 |
| 3 | Kenya | 3 | 1 | 2 | 220 | 232 | −12 | 4 |
| 4 | Rwanda | 3 | 0 | 3 | 189 | 218 | −29 | 3 |

Source: Standings

26 June 2019

| Egypt | 86–82 | Kenya |
Scoring by quarter: 20–17, 20–19, 22–24, 24–22

Kampala, Uganda

26 June 2019

| Uganda | 62–53 | Rwanda |
Scoring by quarter: 23–11, 5–19, 22–13, 12–10

Kampala, Uganda

27 June 2019

| Rwanda | 80–92 | Kenya |
Scoring by quarter: 16–17, 21–22, 16–28, 27–25

Kampala, Uganda

27 June 2019

| Egypt | 64–55 | Uganda |
Scoring by quarter: 8–20, 16–20, 26–9, 14–6

Kampala, Uganda

29 June 2019

| Rwanda | 56–64 | Egypt |
Scoring by quarter: 9–23, 10–14, 10–15, 27–12

Kampala, Uganda

29 June 2019

| Kenya | 46–66 | Uganda |
Scoring by quarter: 15–14, 10–18, 13–19, 8–15

Kampala, Uganda

==== Knockout phase ====
===== Semi-finals =====
30 June 2019

| Egypt | 78–73 | Rwanda |
Scoring by quarter: 17–12, 18–25, 21–22, 22–14

Kampala, Uganda

30 June 2019

| Uganda | 62–67 | Kenya |
Scoring by quarter: 15–17, 10–18, 20–20, 17–12

Kampala, Uganda

===== Third-place game =====
1 July 2019

| Rwanda | 61–97 | Uganda |
Scoring by quarter: 12–27, 13–27, 21–26, 15–17

Kampala, Uganda

===== Final =====
1 July 2019

| Egypt | 90–72 | Kenya |
Scoring by quarter: 18–22, 26–11, 28–20, 18–19

Kampala, Uganda

=== Zone 6 ===
A regional tournament was held on 8 June 2019 in Harare, Zimbabwe. After winning the two games against Zimbabwe, Angola earned its qualification for the 2019 FIBA Women's AfroBasket.

6 June 2019

| Zimbabwe | 53–99 | Angola |
Scoring by quarter: 14–28, 14–21, 10–22, 15–28

Harare, Zimbabwe

8 June 2019

| Angola | 90–64 | Zimbabwe |
Scoring by quarter: 20–14, 28–14, 19–19, 23–17

Harare, Zimbabwe

=== Wildcard ===
DR Congo and Kenya earned a spot for the Women's AfroBasket with a wildcard.
