= 2016 FIBA Africa Women's Clubs Champions Cup squads =

This article displays the rosters for the participating teams at the 2016 FIBA Africa Club Championship for Women.

== (Mozambique) A Politécnica ==
A politécnica – 2016 FIBA Africa Women's Clubs Champions Cup – 8th place roster
Players							Coaches
Pos	#	Nat	Name	Height	Weight	Age	Head Coach
PF	4	(Mozambique)	Yara Pembele	1.71 m (5 ft 7 1/2 in)		2 March 1994 (aged 22)	(Portugal) Hélio de Sousa
PG	5	(Mozambique)	Benezita Muchave	1.70 m (5 ft 7 in)		27 September 1992 (aged 24)
PG	6	(Mozambique)	Lina Samo	1.60 m (5 ft 3 in)		19 May 1994 (aged 22)	Assistant coach(es)
F	7	(Mozambique)	Isabel Mavamba	1.74 m (5 ft 8 1/2 in)		10 January 1992 (aged 24)
PF	8	(Mozambique)	Florentina Senete	1.70 m (5 ft 7 in)		4 February 1996 (aged 20)
SG	9	(Mozambique)	Yolanda Chiulala	1.68 m (5 ft 6 in)		18 April 1993 (aged 23)
C	10	(Mozambique)	Carmen Rezende	1.82 m (5 ft 11 1/2 in)		20 June 1994 (aged 22)
C	11	(Mozambique)	Ornela Mulhui	1.76 m (5 ft 9 1/2 in)		30 August 1989 (aged 27)
C	12	(Mozambique)	Joaquina Mussa	1.77 m (5 ft 9 1/2 in)		4 January 1990 (aged 26)
SG	13	(Mozambique)	Alice Timba	1.70 m (5 ft 7 in)		20 September 1992 (aged 24)
F	14	(Mozambique)	Laky Samo	1.76 m (5 ft 9 1/2 in)		14 March 1997 (aged 19)
C	15	(Mozambique)	Nilza Chiziane	1.88 m (6 ft 2 in)		27 February 1992 (aged 24)

== (Togo) Étoile Filante ==
Étoile Filante – 2016 FIBA Africa Women's Clubs Champions Cup – 10th place roster
Players							Coaches
Pos	#	Nat	Name	Height	Weight	Age	Head Coach
	4	(Togo)	Akossiwa Kamekpo			4 November 1984 (aged 32)	(Togo)
	5	(Togo)	Akpene Kodjo			2 December 1989 (aged 27)
	6	(Benin)	Christelle Houessou			12 April 1990 (aged 26)	Assistant coach(es)
	7	(Togo)	Aku Afetse			8 July 1992 (aged 24)
	8	(Togo)	Amah Adjoussi			8 December 1984 (aged 31)
	9	(Togo)	Nadiya Agbere			3 December 1993 (aged 23)
	10	(Togo)	Samiya Pindra			10 December 1994 (aged 21)
	11	(Togo)	Abra Agossa			12 November 1987 (aged 29)
	12	(Togo)	Mariama Akakpo			12 December 1985 (aged 30)
	13	(Togo)	Biguedenam Bouyo			18 April 1995 (aged 21)
	14	(Togo)	Confort Darlix			17 November 1995 (aged 21)

== (Cameroon) FAP Yaoundé ==
FAP Yaoundé – 2016 FIBA Africa Women's Clubs Champions Cup – 6th place roster
Players							Coaches
Pos	#	Nat	Name	Height	Weight	Age	Head Coach
PG	4	(Cameroon)	Bella Minna	1.66 m (5 ft 5 1/2 in)		6 June 1984 (aged 32)	(Cameroon) François Enyegue
G	5	(Cameroon)	Aïcha Njiké	1.71 m (5 ft 7 1/2 in)		18 April 1983 (aged 33)
SG	6	(Cameroon)	Astrid Njiogap	1.74 m (5 ft 8 1/2 in)		23 August 1988 (aged 28)	Assistant coach(es)
PG	7	(Cameroon)	Priscilla Mbiandja	1.73 m (5 ft 8 in)		22 February 1989 (aged 27)
G	8	(Cameroon)	Edith Tosom	1.72 m (5 ft 7 1/2 in)		29 October 1986 (aged 30)
PG	9	(Cameroon)	Marguerite Banbe	1.61 m (5 ft 3 1/2 in)		25 May 1988 (aged 28)
G	10	(Cameroon)	Rebecca Edimo	1.62 m (5 ft 4 in)		20 September 1989 (aged 27)
PF	11	(Cameroon)	Salomé Ndjana	1.77 m (5 ft 9 1/2 in)		2 August 1990 (aged 26)
PF	12	(Cameroon)	Duchelle Tiomo	1.84 m (6 ft 1/2 in)		2 March 1989 (aged 27)
PF	13	(Cameroon)	Marie Nkoumou	1.87 m (6 ft 1 1/2 in)		15 August 1990 (aged 26)
F	14	(Cameroon)	Clémence Ngayomba	1.80 m (5 ft 11 in)		19 March 1986 (aged 30)
C	15	(Cameroon)	Amandine Fabo	1.93 m (6 ft 4 in)		21 April 1992 (aged 24)

== (Mozambique) Ferroviário de Maputo ==
Ferroviário de Maputo – 2016 FIBA Africa Women's Clubs Champions Cup – Silver medal roster
Players							Coaches
Pos	#	Nat	Name	Height	Weight	Age	Head Coach
G	4	(Mozambique)	Elizabeth Pereira	1.72 m (5 ft 7 1/2 in)		8 November 1991 (aged 25)	(Mozambique) Leonel Manhique
F	5	(Mozambique)	Vilma Covane	1.80 m (5 ft 11 in)		10 October 1996 (aged 20)
SF	6	(Mozambique)	Ingvild Mucauro	1.78 m (5 ft 10 in)		12 September 1992 (aged 24)	Assistant coach(es)
F	7	(Mozambique)	Rute Muianga	1.75 m (5 ft 9 in)		6 April 1983 (aged 33)
SG	8	(Mozambique)	Ana Jaime	1.72 m (5 ft 7 1/2 in)		6 December 1990 (aged 25)
PG	9	(Mozambique)	Dulce Mahgaia	1.65 m (5 ft 5 in)		5 November 1988 (aged 28)
SG	10	(Mozambique)	Anabela Cossa	1.72 m (5 ft 7 1/2 in)		7 April 1986 (aged 30)
PG	11	(Mozambique)	Ornélia Mutombene	1.68 m (5 ft 6 in)		24 October 1990 (aged 26)
SF	12	(United States)	Brea Edwards	1.78 m (5 ft 10 in)		15 April 1993 (aged 23)
C	13	(United States)	Rachel Mitchell	2.01 m (6 ft 7 in)		7 February 1992 (aged 24)
PF	14	(Mozambique)	Odélia Mafanela	1.80 m (5 ft 11 in)		14 April 1989 (aged 27)
PF	15	(Mozambique)	Cecília Henriques	1.83 m (6 ft 0 in)		24 August 1990 (aged 26)

== (Nigeria) First Bank ==
First Bank – 2016 FIBA Africa Women's Clubs Champions Cup – Bronze medal roster
Players							Coaches
Pos	#	Nat	Name	Height	Weight	Age	Head Coach
	4	(Nigeria)	Bilqis Adekoya			17 May 1994 (aged 22)	(Nigeria) Peter Ahmedu
G	5	(Nigeria)	Upe Atosu	1.65 m (5 ft 5 in)		21 April 1993 (aged 23)
	6	(Nigeria)	Deborah Nwakamma			27 April 1997 (aged 19)	Assistant coach(es)
PG	7	(Mexico)	Brisa Rodriguez	1.68 m (5 ft 6 in)		7 March 1984 (aged 32)
	8	(Nigeria)	Nkechi Akashili	1.75 m (5 ft 9 in)		22 February 1990 (aged 26)
	9	(Nigeria)	Magdalene Ukato			12 February 1986 (aged 30)
	10	(Nigeria)	Olayinka Sanni	1.88 m (6 ft 2 in)		21 August 1986 (aged 30)
	11	(Ivory Coast)	Minata Fofana			22 March 1986 (aged 30)
	12	(Nigeria)	Nkem Akaraiwe	1.85 m (6 ft 1 in)		22 December 1996 (aged 19)
	13	(Nigeria)	Bukky Daniel			24 September 1998 (aged 18)
C	14	(Nigeria)	Priscilla Udeaja	1.90 m (6 ft 3 in)		29 June 1984 (aged 32)
	15	(Nigeria)	Odion Elawure			26 May 1995 (aged 21)

== (Algeria) GS Pétroliers ==
GS Pétroliers – 2016 FIBA Africa Women's Clubs Champions Cup – 5th place roster
Players							Coaches
Pos	#	Nat	Name	Height	Weight	Age	Head Coach
	4	(Algeria)	Badia Kellal			19 October 1997 (aged 19)	(Algeria) Sofiane Boulahia
	5	(Algeria)	Nesrine Taïbi	1.87 m (6 ft 1 1/2 in)		28 June 1988 (aged 28)
	6	(Algeria)	Ikbal Chenaf	1.80 m (5 ft 11 in)		21 September 1993 (aged 23)	Assistant coach(es)
	7	(Algeria)	Nesrine Boukerma			16 February 1994 (aged 22)
	8	(Algeria)	Rachida Belaidi			28 November 1979 (aged 37)
	9	(Algeria)	Nadia Isli	1.68 m (5 ft 6 in)		14 March 1983 (aged 33)
	10	(Algeria)	Lilia Refes	1.67 m (5 ft 5 1/2 in)		11 February 1995 (aged 21)
	11	(Algeria)	Samiya Boudjerima	1.69 m (5 ft 6 1/2 in)		26 April 1988 (aged 28)
	12	(Algeria)	Rania Albane			22 November 1996 (aged 20)
	13	(Algeria)	Shahnez Boushaki	1.75 m (5 ft 9 in)		22 October 1985 (aged 31)
	14	(Democratic Republic of the Congo)	Thethe Kazadi			13 September 1983 (aged 33)
	15	(Democratic Republic of the Congo)	Mireille Nyota			2 February 1990 (aged 26)

== (Angola) Interclube ==
G.D. Interclube – 2015 FIBA Africa Women's Clubs Champions Cup – Gold medal roster
Players							Coaches
Pos	#	Nat	Name	Height	Weight	Age	Head Coach
SG	6	(Angola) (United States)	Italee Lucas	1.73 m (5 ft 8 in)		12 January 1989 (aged 27)	(Angola) Apolinário Paquete
PG	7	(Angola)	Merciana Fernandes	1.69 m (5 ft 6 1/2 in)		2 April 1992 (aged 24)
SF	8	(Angola)	Rosemira Daniel	1.72 m (5 ft 7 1/2 in)		24 October 1993 (aged 23)	Assistant coach(es)
SF	9	(Angola)	Astrida Vicente	1.73 m (5 ft 8 in)		6 October 1978 (aged 38)	(Angola) Elisa Pires
G	10	(United States)	Sequoia Holmes	1.78 m (5 ft 10 in)	70 kg (150 lb)	13 June 1986 (aged 30)
PF	12	(Angola)	Nadir Manuel	1.88 m (6 ft 2 in)	79 kg (174 lb)	30 November 1986 (aged 30)
SF	13	(Angola)	Felizarda Jorge	1.72 m (5 ft 7 1/2 in)	78 kg (172 lb)	23 February 1985 (aged 31)
C	14	(Angola)	Angelina Golome	1.92 m (6 ft 3 1/2 in)		23 March 1988 (aged 28)
PF	15	(Angola)	Ngiendula Filipe (C)	1.80 m (5 ft 11 in)	72 kg (159 lb)	20 May 1982 (aged 34)
PG	17	(Angola)	Luzia Simão	1.65 m (5 ft 5 in)		20 February 1992 (aged 24)
C	18	(Democratic Republic of the Congo)	Pauline Nsimbo	1.86 m (6 ft 1 in)		9 January 1982 (aged 34)
SG	19	(Angola)	Emanuela Mateus	1.70 m (5 ft 7 in)		19 February 1997 (aged 19)

== Kenya Ports Authority ==
Kenya Ports Authority – 2016 FIBA Africa Women's Clubs Champions Cup – 7th place roster
Players							Coaches
Pos	#	Nat	Name	Height	Weight	Age	Head Coach
SG	4	(Kenya)	Hilda Luvandwa	1.67 m (5 ft 5 1/2 in)		18 May 1985 (aged 31)	(Kenya) Anthony Ojukwu
SG	5	(Kenya)	Helen Oketch	1.65 m (5 ft 5 in)		24 April 1992 (aged 24)
SG	6	(Kenya)	Betty Maithima	1.75 m (5 ft 9 in)		4 September 1992 (aged 24)	Assistant coach(es)
PG	7	(Kenya)	Betty Mjomba	1.67 m (5 ft 5 1/2 in)		30 August 1985 (aged 31)
SG	8	(Kenya)	Mandela Lumutu	1.75 m (5 ft 9 in)		4 July 1990 (aged 26)
SG	9	(Kenya)	Brenda Jumba	1.67 m (5 ft 5 1/2 in)		19 September 1986 (aged 30)
PG	10	(Kenya)	Natalie Mwangale	1.65 m (5 ft 5 in)		7 September 1993 (aged 23)
C	11	(Kenya)	Belinda Okoth	1.90 m (6 ft 3 in)		21 May 1987 (aged 29)
C	12	(Kenya)	Yvonne Odhiambo	1.87 m (6 ft 1 1/2 in)		26 February 1988 (aged 28)
C	13	(Kenya)	Mercy Wanyama	1.85 m (6 ft 1 in)		14 January 1992 (aged 24)
G	14	(Kenya)	Selina Okumu	1.54 m (5 ft 1/2 in)		11 August 1993 (aged 23)
C	15	(Kenya)	Felmas Koranga	1.82 m (5 ft 11 1/2 in)		1 February 1996 (aged 20)

== (Angola) Primeiro de Agosto ==
Primeiro de Agosto – 2016 FIBA Africa Women's Clubs Champions Cup – 4th place roster
Players							Coaches
Pos	#	Nat	Name	Height	Weight	Age	Head Coach
PF	6	(Mozambique)	Leia Dongue	1.85 m (6 ft 1 in)		24 May 1991 (aged 25)	(Angola) Jaime Covilhã
SG	7	(Angola)	Rosa Gala	1.73 m (5 ft 8 in)	62 kg (137 lb)	17 April 1995 (aged 21)
PG	8	(Angola)	Isabel Francisco	1.66 m (5 ft 5 1/2 in)	65 kg (143 lb)	Assistant coach(es)
SF	9	(Angola)	Helena Viegas			27 April 1995 (aged 21)	(Angola) Jaqueline Francisco
F	10	(Angola)	Sónia Guadalupe	1.88 m (6 ft 2 in)	77 kg (170 lb)	15 September 1985 (aged 31)
C	11	(Angola)	Luísa Tomás	1.92 m (6 ft 3 1/2 in)	82 kg (181 lb)	24 March 1983 (aged 33)
PF	13	(Angola)	Cristiana Correia	1.85 m (6 ft 1 in)		30 September 1997 (aged 19)
PF	14	(Angola)	Ana Gonçalves	1.82 m (5 ft 11 1/2 in)	79 kg (174 lb)	3 January 1993 (aged 23)
SF	15	(Angola)	Juda Quindanda	1.75 m (5 ft 9 in)		19 July 1998 (aged 18)
F	17	(Angola)	Joana Bende	1.78 m (5 ft 10 in)		4 May 1996 (aged 20)
C	20	(Angola)	Cristina Matiquite	1.91 m (6 ft 3 in)		12 March 1992 (aged 24)
PF	21	(United States)	Danielle McCray	1.78 m (5 ft 10 in)		8 October 1987 (aged 29)

== (Kenya) USIU Flames ==
USIU Flames – 2016 FIBA Africa Women's Clubs Champions Cup – 9th place roster
Players							Coaches
Pos	#	Nat	Name	Height	Weight	Age	Head Coach
	4	(Kenya)	Clarice Odhiambo	1.70 m (5 ft 7 in)		10 August 1993 (aged 23)	(Kenya) George Mayienga
	5	(Kenya)	Doreen Nyagah	1.70 m (5 ft 7 in)	54 kg (119 lb)	25 September 1993 (aged 23)
	6	(Kenya)	Esther Mwangi	1.68 m (5 ft 6 in)		4 August 1994 (aged 22)	Assistant coach(es)
	7	(Kenya)	Aurelia Achieng	1.72 m (5 ft 7 1/2 in)		3 October 1995 (aged 21)	(Kenya) Bonfas Salamo
	12	(Kenya)	Cynthia Irankunda	1.68 m (5 ft 6 in)	61 kg (134 lb)	19 September 1991 (aged 25)
	13	(Kenya)	Cylia Ochieng	1.82 m (5 ft 11 1/2 in)		11 August 1996 (aged 20)
	14	(Kenya)	Angela Okoth	1.84 m (6 ft 1/2 in)		8 August 1985 (aged 31)
	15	(Burundi)	Diane Nikuze	1.74 m (5 ft 8 1/2 in)		18 January 1989 (aged 27)
	18	(Kenya)	Melissa Otieno	1.76 m (5 ft 9 1/2 in)		3 July 1992 (aged 24)
	20	(Kenya)	Georgia Otieno	1.68 m (5 ft 6 in)	65 kg (143 lb)	12 June 1992 (aged 24)
	21	(Kenya)	Maureen Andalia	1.76 m (5 ft 9 1/2 in)		12 April 1987 (aged 29)

== See also ==
- 2015 FIBA Africa Championship for Women squads
