= Burkina Faso men's national under-16 basketball team =

Burkina Faso
- FIBA zone: FIBA Africa

World Championships
- Appearances: None

African Championships
- Appearances: None

The Burkina Faso national under-16 basketball team is a national basketball team of Burkina Faso, governed by the Fédération Burkinabe de Basketball. It represents the country in international under-16 (under age 16) basketball competitions.

Its last appearance was at the 2009 FIBA Africa Under-16 Championship qualification stage.

== See also ==
- Burkina Faso men's national basketball team
- Burkina Faso men's national under-18 basketball team
- Burkina Faso women's national basketball team
- Burkina Faso women's national under-18 basketball team
