= Raneem =

Raneem is a given name. Notable people with the name include:

- Raneem El-Gedawy (born 1997), Egyptian basketball player
- Raneem El Weleily (born 1989), Egyptian squash player

. Notable people with the name include:

Raneem El-Gedawy (born 1997), Egyptian basketball player Raneem El Weleily (born 1989), Egyptian squash player

This page or section lists people that share the same given name. If an internal link led you here, you may wish to change that link to point directly to the
