= Alexandra Green =

Alexandra Green may refer to:

- Alexandra Lisney, née Green, Australian rower and cyclist
- Alexandra Green (basketball), Cameroonian basketball player
