= Sarah Imovbioh =

Nigerian basketball player

No. 24 – PEAC-Pécs
- Position: Center
- League: NB I/A

Personal information
- Born: 24 May 1992 (age 34) Abuja, Nigeria
- Listed height: 1.85 m (6 ft 1 in)
- Listed weight: 77 kg (170 lb)

Career information
- High school: St. Anne's-Belfield School (Charlottesville, Virginia)
- College: University of Virginia (2013-2015) South Carolina (2016)
- WNBA draft: 2016: undrafted

Sarah Imovbioh (born 24 May 1992) is a Nigerian basketball player for PEAC-Pécs and the Nigerian national team.

== International career ==
She participated at the 2018 FIBA Women's Basketball World Cup. she also participated at 2019 Women's Afrobasket where she won gold with the Nigerian Female basketball team.
