= 2020 FIBA Women's Olympic Qualifying Tournaments =

2020 FIBA Olympic Qualifying Tournaments
For Women

Tournament details
- Host country: Belgium; China (canceled); France; Serbia
- Dates: 6–9 February
- Teams: 16 (from 4 federations)
- Venues: 3 (in 3 host cities)

The 2020 FIBA World Olympic Qualifying Tournaments for Women were the three women's basketball tournaments that were contested by 16 national teams, where the top teams earned a place in the 2020 Summer Olympics basketball tournament. It was held from 6 to 9 February 2020.

== Format ==
The 16 teams were divided into four groups (Groups A–D) for the qualifying tournaments.

== Hosts selection ==
The cities of Ostend, Bourges and Belgrade hosted the tournaments. Foshan was also selected, but due to concerns about the coronavirus pandemic it was relocated to Belgrade.

== Teams ==
Means of qualification	Date	Venue	Berths	Qualified
EuroBasket Women 2019	27 June–7 July 2019	Serbia; Latvia	6	Great Britain
EuroBasket Women 2019	27 June–7 July 2019	Serbia; Latvia	6	Spain
EuroBasket Women 2019	27 June–7 July 2019	Serbia; Latvia	6	France
EuroBasket Women 2019	27 June–7 July 2019	Serbia; Latvia	6	Serbia
EuroBasket Women 2019	27 June–7 July 2019	Serbia; Latvia	6	Belgium
EuroBasket Women 2019	27 June–7 July 2019	Serbia; Latvia	6	Sweden
Africa pre-qualifying tournament	14–17 November 2019	Mozambique	2	Nigeria
Africa pre-qualifying tournament	14–17 November 2019	Mozambique	2	Mozambique
Americas pre-qualifying tournaments	14–17 November 2019	Argentina	2	United States
Americas pre-qualifying tournaments	14–17 November 2019	Argentina	2	Brazil
Americas pre-qualifying tournaments	14–17 November 2019	Canada	2	Canada
Americas pre-qualifying tournaments	14–17 November 2019	Canada	2	Puerto Rico
Asia/Oceania Pre-qualifying tournaments	14–17 November 2019	Malaysia	2	Japan
Asia/Oceania Pre-qualifying tournaments	14–17 November 2019	Malaysia	2	Australia
Asia/Oceania Pre-qualifying tournaments	14–17 November 2019	New Zealand	2	China
Asia/Oceania Pre-qualifying tournaments	14–17 November 2019	New Zealand	2	South Korea
Total			16	

== Draw ==
The draw took place at The House of Basketball in Mies, Switzerland on 27 November 2019. There were four World Olympic Qualifying Tournaments. Each tournament featured four teams, three of whom qualified for the Olympic Games. However, because the host nation and the World Cup winner were playing in the qualifying tournaments, the tournaments in which they played each awarded only two additional spots.

=== Seeding ===
The latest ranking before the draw served as the basis to determine the pots for the draw (seeding in brackets).

Pot 1	Pot 2	Pot 3	Pot 4
United States (1); Australia (2); Spain (3); Canada (4)	France (5); Serbia (7); China (8); Belgium (9)	Japan (10); Brazil (15); Nigeria (16); Great Britain (18)	South Korea (19); Sweden (22); Puerto Rico (23); Mozambique (43)

The following restrictions apply:

- Spain could not be drawn in the group hosted by another European country (Ostend, Bourges and Belgrade)
- Australia could not be drawn in the group hosted by another Asian/Oceania country (Foshan)
- Japan could not be drawn in the group with the US, Australia or China
- Brazil could not be drawn in the group with the USA or Canada
- Mozambique had to be drawn in the group with Nigeria
- Sweden could not be drawn with two European teams

== Qualifying tournaments ==
=== Ostend ===
The tournament was held in Ostend, Belgium.

Pos	Team	Pld	W	L	PF	PA	PD	Pts	Qualification
1	Canada	3	3	0	211	174	+37	6	Summer Olympics
2	Belgium (H)	3	2	1	209	198	+11	5	Summer Olympics
3	Japan (Note: Japan has already qualified as the host nation.)	3	1	2	227	216	+11	4	
4	Sweden	3	0	3	157	216	−59	3	

Source: FIBA
Rules for classification: 1) Points; 2) Head-to-head results; 3) Points difference; 4) Points scored.
(H) Hosts

=== Bourges ===
The tournament was held in Bourges, France.

Pos	Team	Pld	W	L	PF	PA	PD	Pts	Qualification
1	France (H)	3	3	0	250	186	+64	6	Summer Olympics
2	Australia	3	2	1	249	218	+31	5	Summer Olympics
3	Puerto Rico	3	1	2	216	278	−62	4	Summer Olympics
4	Brazil	3	0	3	233	266	−33	3	

Source: FIBA
Rules for classification: 1) Points; 2) Head-to-head results; 3) Points difference; 4) Points scored.
(H) Hosts

=== Belgrade – Group A ===
The tournament was held in Belgrade, Serbia.

Pos	Team	Pld	W	L	PF	PA	PD	Pts	Qualification
1	United States (Note: The United States has already qualified as the World Cup winners.)	3	3	0	288	189	+99	6	
2	Serbia (H)	3	2	1	215	200	+15	5	Summer Olympics
3	Nigeria	3	1	2	220	197	+23	4	Summer Olympics
4	Mozambique	3	0	3	148	285	−137	3	

Source: FIBA
Rules for classification: 1) Points; 2) Head-to-head results; 3) Points difference; 4) Points scored.
(H) Hosts

=== Belgrade – Group B ===
The tournament was moved from Foshan, China to Belgrade, Serbia due to concerns about the coronavirus pandemic.

Pos	Team	Pld	W	L	PF	PA	PD	Pts	Qualification
1	China	3	3	0	250	198	+52	6	Summer Olympics
2	Spain	3	2	1	224	179	+45	5	Summer Olympics
3	South Korea	3	1	2	188	262	−74	4	Summer Olympics
4	Great Britain	3	0	3	224	247	−23	3	

Source: FIBA
Rules for classification: 1) Points; 2) Head-to-head results; 3) Points difference; 4) Points scored.

== See also ==
- 2020 FIBA Men's Olympic Qualifying Tournaments
- Basketball at the 2020 Summer Olympics
