= Tamara Seda =

American-Mozambican basketball player

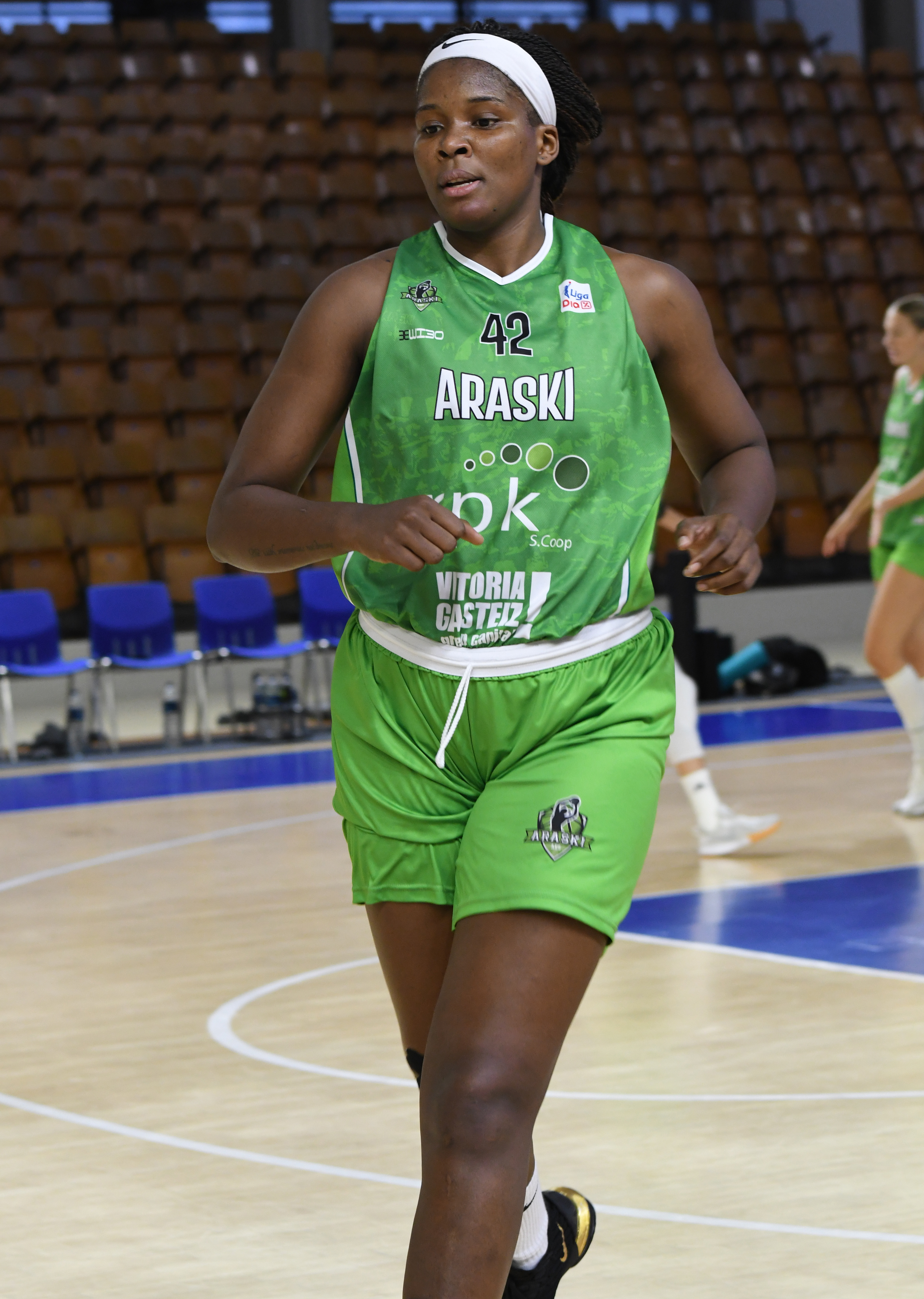

No. 42 – Kutaxabank Araski
- Position: Forward

Personal information
- Born: June 19, 1994 (age 32) Maputo, Mozambique
- Listed height: 6 ft 4 in (1.93 m)

Career information
- College: The University of Texas at El Paso
- Playing career: 2011–present

Tamara Seda (born Oct 18, 1998) is a Mozambican basketball player. She plays professionally for Kutxabank Araski and also Mozambique women's national basketball team

== College ==
Seda graduated from The University of Texas at El Paso, but prior to UTEP she was a student of Seward County Community College where she averaged 14.2 points per game, 9.8 rebounds per game and 26 assists.

In her sophomore year at UTEP, she appeared in 34 games, including two starts, she had 4.1 points per game and 4.4 rebounds per game. As a junior she averaged 9.6 points, 9.0 rebounds and 1.6 blocks. Also in her senior year she had 15 double-doubles, 14.9 points per game and 9.6 rebounds per game.

== National Team career ==
Seda participated in the 2017 FIBA Women's AfroBasket with Mozambique, averaging 9.3 points, 8.6 rebounds, and 0.3 assists per game. She also participated in the 2019 and 2021 editions of the tournament. She averaged 10.6 points, 11.4 rebounds, 1 assist per game and 8.8 points, 8.7 rebounds and 1.8 assists per game respectively.
