= Raneem El-Gedawy =

Egyptian basketball player

Personal information
- Born: February 24, 1997 (age 29) Alexandria, Egypt
- Listed height: 6 ft 4 in (1.93 m)

Career information
- College: Western Kentucky University
- NBA draft: 2022: undrafted
- Position: Forward
- Number: 15

Career history
- –2021: Alexandria Sporting Club
- 2021–present: Al Ahly

Raneem El-Gedawy (Arabic: رنيم الجداوي; born February 24, 1997), known also as Raneem Mohamed (رنيم محمد), is an Egyptian basketball player. She plays professionally for Al Ahly women's team and the Egypt women's national basketball team.

== College ==
El-Gedawy was a student of Western Kentucky University. During her freshman season, she averaged nine points and 7.1 rebounds with 42 total blocks and 30 steals. She became the first player to capture "C-USA Freshman of the Year honors". She was named "C-USA Freshman of the Week" four times while becoming the first WKU player to be honored as the "USBWA National Freshman of the Week".

As a sophomore El-Gedawy started all 35 games and finished the season with six double-double performances. As a junior, she averaged 17.6 points per game, a double-double with 11.0 rebounds per game. She made history by becoming the 41st Lady Topper in the 1,000 Point Club and ended the season with 1,346 career points which ranks as the 23rd.

In her senior year, El-Gedawy played in 16 games, scored in double figures in all games, and averaged 20.9 points per game, and 12.1 rebounds.

== International career ==
El-Gedawy represented Egyptian U16 national team at the 2013 Africa Championship, Egypt U17 during the 2014 World Championship, and Egypt U19 during the 2015 World Championship. She played for the Egyptian senior basketball team at the AfroBasket Women in 2015, 2019, 2021 and 2023.

Furthermore, she represented Egypt national 3x3 team, where she won the gold medal in the 2022 Africa Cup, and silver in 2023. She also featured in the 2023 FIBA 3x3 World Cup.
