= Alexia Barros =

Basketball Player (born 1994)

Alexia Barros (born October 27, 1994, in New Bedford) is a Cape Verdean basketball player representing the national women's basketball team. She plays as a guard and is 5 feet 8 inches (172 cm) tall. She attended Lethbridge College in 2015.

== Career statistics ==
In 2019, Barros played in three games for the 2019 FIBA Women's Afrobasket, as well as two games in the qualifiers. In the qualifiers, she averaged 11 points, 6 rebounds, 0.5 assists per game, and an efficiency rating of 7. In the finals, she averaged 11.7 points, 2.7 rebounds, and 3 assists per game, with an efficiency rating of 7.3. In 2021, she played one game in the 2021 FIBA Women's Afrobasket - Qualifiers, where she scored 12 points, with no recorded rebounds or assists, resulting in an efficiency rating of 7. The overall average for her performance across these events stands at 11.4 points, 3.7 rebounds, and 1 assist per game, with an efficiency rating of 7.
