= Reem Moussa =

American-Egyptian basketball player

No. 1 – Sporting Alexandria
- Position: Point guard

Personal information
- Born: January 23, 1994 (age 32) Cairo, Egypt
- Listed height: 5 ft 6 in (1.68 m)

Career information
- High school: Coppell
- College: Rice (2011–2014)

Career highlights
- FIBA Africa Women's Clubs Champions Cup (2022)

Reem Moussa (Arabic: ريم موسى; born 23 January 1994) is an Egyptian basketball player who currently plays for the Alexandria Sporting Club and the Egyptian national team.

== High school ==
She is a 2011 graduate of Coppell High School. A two-year starter and also averaged 10.2 points, 3.6 rebounds, and 6.7 assists in her senior year.

== College ==
She attended Rice University OWLS. In her junior year (2013-2014), she played in all 30 games, making 25 starts, averaged 3.8 points and 1.6 rebounds while playing 21.6 minutes per game.

As a senior, she played in 26 games, making 12 starts, averaged 4.7 points and 2.2 assists in 16.3 minutes per game. She was named the "Owls Most Improved Player" and also named to the "C-USA Commissioner's Honor Roll".

== Professional career ==
In 2022, Moussa played for Alexandria Sporting Club and won the 2022 FIBA Africa Women's Champions Cup title. She was named to the All-Tournament Team after the finals.

== National Team Career ==
She was a member of Egypt's National U19 squad that won a bronze medal at the 2012 FIBA Africa Under-18 Championship for Women in Senegal. She averaged 6.7 points, 2.8 rebounds and 2.5 assists in six games, making three starts.

She also played in the 2021 Women's Afrobasket where she averaged 3.3 points, 2.5 rebounds, and 5 assists.

== Career statistics ==
Legend
GP	Games played	GS	Games started	MPG	Minutes per game	RPG	Rebounds per game
APG	Assists per game	SPG	Steals per game	BPG	Blocks per game	PPG	Points per game
TO	Turnovers per game	FG%	Field-goal percentage	3P%	3-point field-goal percentage	FT%	Free-throw percentage
**Bold**	Career best	°	League leader

=== College ===
Year	Team	GP	GS	MPG	FG%	3P%	FT%	RPG	APG	SPG	BPG	TO	PPG
2011–12	Rice	18	0	5.7	**45.0**	33.3	50.0	0.6	0.8	0.1	0.0	**1.5**	1.1
2012–13	Rice	22	0	5.2	22.7	**50.0**	0.0	0.8	0.5	0.3	0.0	**1.5**	0.5
2013–14	Rice	**30**	**25**	**21.6**	33.6	27.0	55.3	**1.6**	**3.0**	**0.7**	0.0	2.9	3.8
2014–15	Rice	26	12	16.3	40.6	42.4	**77.8**	1.4	2.3	**0.7**	0.0	2.7	**4.7**
**Career**		96	37	13.4	36.3	34.7	61.4	1.2	1.8	0.5	0.0	2.3	2.8
Statistics retrieved from Sports-Reference.
