= Kadidia Maiga =

Malian basketball player (born 1997)

No. 8 – DUC Dakar
- Position: Forward
- League: SD1

Personal information
- Born: 6 April 1997 (age 29) Senou, Mali
- Listed height: 1.85 m (6 ft 1 in)
- Listed weight: 70 kg (154 lb)

Career information
- WNBA draft: 2019: undrafted

Kadidia Maiga (born 6 April 1997) is a Malian basketball player for DUC Dakar and the Malian national team.

She represented Mali at the 2019 Women's Afrobasket.
