= Burkina Faso women's national under-18 basketball team =

Burkina Faso
- FIBA zone: FIBA Africa

World Championships for Women
- Appearances: None

African Championships for Women
- Appearances: None

The Burkina Faso women's national under-18 basketball team is a national basketball team of Burkina Faso, governed by the Fédération Burkinabe de Basketball. It represents the country in international under-18 (under age 18) women's basketball competitions.

Its last appearance was at the 2014 FIBA Africa Under-18 Championship for Women qualification stage.

== See also ==
- Burkina Faso women's national basketball team
- Burkina Faso men's national under-18 basketball team
