= Delma Zita =

Mozambican basketball player (born 1998)

Delma Zita (born March 27, 1998) is a Mozambican basketball player representing the national women's basketball team. She attended high school at Escola Secundária Gwaza Muthini. She is 5 feet 8 inches (172 cm) tall and also plays as a Guard. She is from Maputo, Mozambique. She currently plays for Costa do Sol (a Mozambican club), after having played for Ferroviário de Maputo and also for, UTEP in the US.

== Career highlights ==
Zita's performance is outlined for both the Senior National Team, National Team Youth, and in league play across various events and years. In the 2023 FIBA Women's AfroBasket, she played six games, averaging 1.7 points per game (PPG), 0.8 rebounds per game (RPG), 1.8 assists per game (APG), and earning an efficiency (EFF) rating of 1.8. In the 2020 FIBA Women's Olympic Qualifying Tournaments in Belgrade, Serbia, Zita participated in three games, averaging 5 points, 1.7 rebounds, 0.7 assists, and an EFF rating of 3. Additionally, in the 2019 FIBA Women's Olympic Pre-Qualifying African Tournament, she played two games, averaging 3.5 points, 3 rebounds, 3 assists, and an EFF rating of 5.5. Moreover, during the 2019 FIBA Women's Afrobasket, she played five games, averaging 3.4 points, 2.8 rebounds, 4.6 assists, and an EFF rating of 7.6. Her total average across these senior team events stands at 3.4 points, 2.1 rebounds, 2.5 assists, and an EFF rating of 4.5.

In her performances for the National Team Youth, Zita participated in the 2016 Afrobasket U18 Women, playing six games with averages of 7.8 points, 3.3 rebounds, 2 assists, and an EFF rating of 0.2.

In league play for the 2019 FIBA Africa Champions Cup Women – Final Round and the 2018 FIBA Africa Women's Champions Cup with Club Ferroviario Maputo, Zita played multiple games with respective averages of 2.8 points, 2.7 rebounds, 2.3 assists, and an EFF rating of 7.3, and 4.8 points, 2.2 rebounds, 2.2 assists, and an EFF rating of 5. Her total average across these league games stands at 4.1 points, 2.4 rebounds, 2.2 assists, and an EFF rating of 5.8.
