= Touty Gandega =

French-Malian basketball player

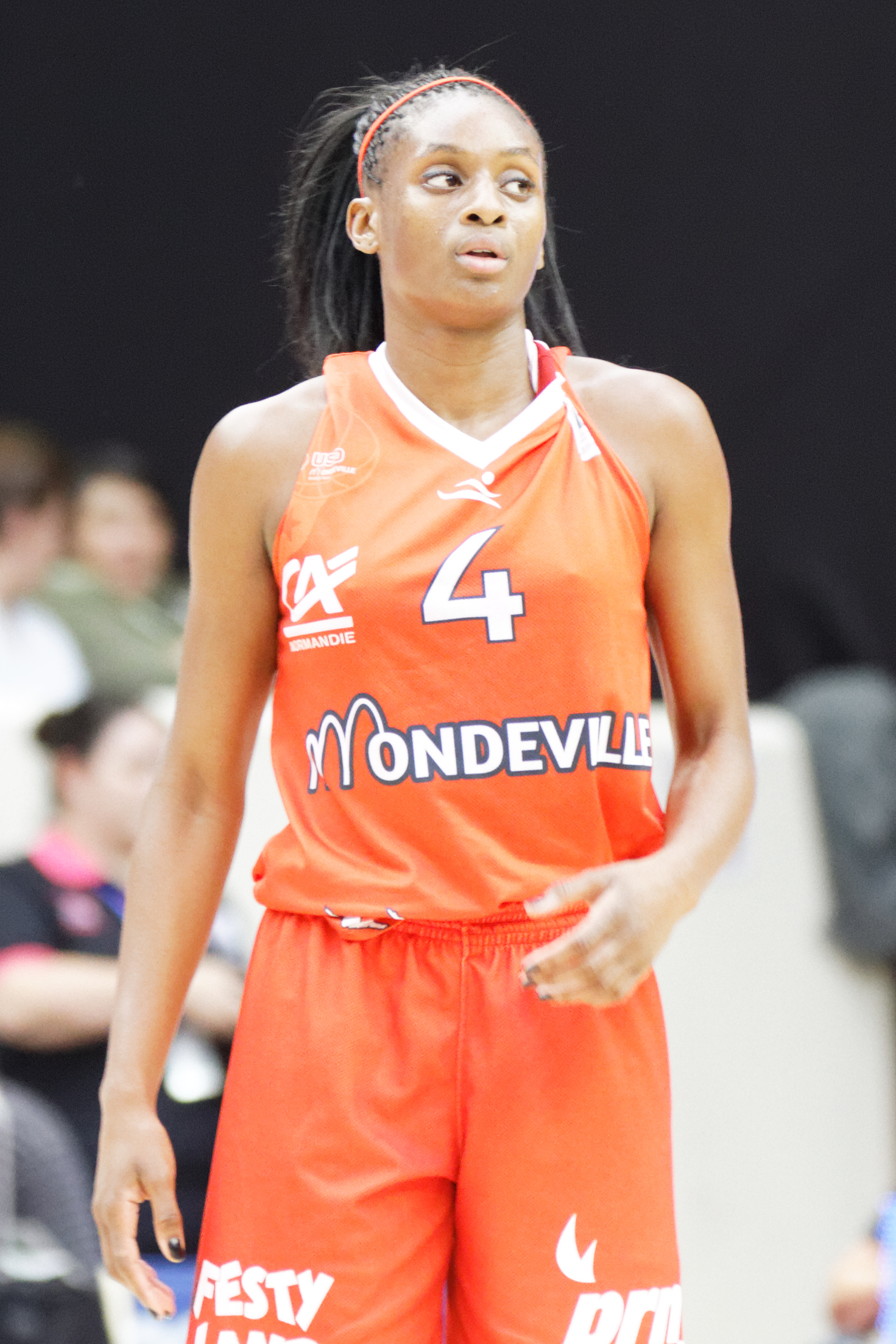

No. 8 – Angers Basket 49
- Position: Power forward
- League: LFB

Personal information
- Born: 20 June 1991 (age 35) Paris, France
- Listed height: 1.75 m (5 ft 9 in)
- Listed weight: 60 kg (132 lb)

Career information
- WNBA draft: 2013: undrafted
Medals
Women's basketball
Representing Mali
AfroBasket
Bronze medal – third place	2017 Mali
Bronze medal – third place	2019 Senegal

Touty Gandega (born 20 June 1991) is a French-Malian women's basketball player for Angers Basket 49. Touty is the Sister of Diana Gandega who also plays basketball.
