= Egypt women's national basketball team =

Egypt
- FIBA ranking: 45 ▼2 (18 March 2026)
- Joined FIBA: 1934
- FIBA zone: FIBA Africa
- National federation: Egyptian Basketball Federation
- Coach: Julián Martínez

AfroBasket
- Appearances: 15
- Medals: (1966, 1968) (1970, 1977) (1974)
Home	Away	Third
Fourth

The Egypt women's national basketball team is the nationally controlled basketball team representing Egypt at world basketball competitions for women.

== Results ==
=== African Championship ===
Egypt women's national basketball team won the FIBA Africa Championship for Women in 1966 and 1968 and came second in 1970 as the United Arab Republic. In the 1974 championship Egypt won third place and they were the runner up in 1977 championship. More recently they came seventh in 2000

- 1966 – 1st
- 1968 – 1st
- 1970 – 2nd
- 1974 – 3rd
- 1977 – 2nd
- 1984 – 6th
- 1990 – 7th
- 2000 – 7th
- 2013 – 8th
- 2015 – 8th
- 2017 – 7th
- 2019 – 7th
- 2021 – 6th
- 2023 – 10th
- 2025 – 9th

=== Pan-Arab games ===
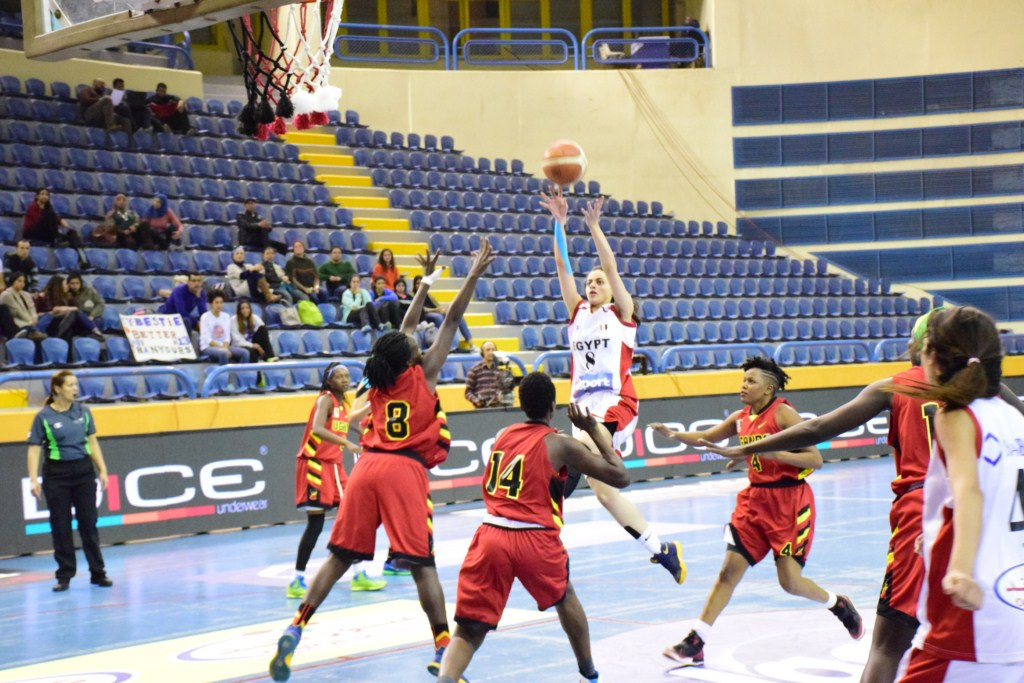
The Egypt women's national basketball team against Uganda

Egypt's team was the runner-up in 2011, winning four matches and losing only to Lebanon.

=== All Africa Games ===
Egypt women's team won three bronze medals in Basketball at the All-Africa Games.

== Current roster ==
Roster for the 2025 Women's Afrobasket.

Egypt women's national basketball team roster
Players
Coaches

Pos.	No.	Name	Age – Date of birth	Height	Club	Ctr.
SG	2	Laila Khalifa	21 – 12 July 2004	1.70 m (5 ft 7 in)	Al Zohour	(Egypt)
PG	3	Alia El-Shabrawy	23 – 1 October 2001	1.59 m (5 ft 3 in)	Heliopolis	(Egypt)
SF	4	Meral Abdelgawad	26 – 13 November 1998	1.81 m (5 ft 11 in)	Al Ahly	(Egypt)
PG	5	Radwa Oweis	25 – 14 November 1999	1.65 m (5 ft 5 in)	Al Ahly	(Egypt)
PG	6	Ingy Badawy	24 – 8 July 2001	1.73 m (5 ft 8 in)	Smouha SC	(Egypt)
C	7	Khadiga Abouelghait	18 – 1 March 2007	1.90 m (6 ft 3 in)	Gezira	(Egypt)
G	9	Asrar Bakr	26 – 10 August 1998	1.80 m (5 ft 11 in)	Alexandria	(Egypt)
SF	10	Norhan Amed	29 – 21 July 1996	1.79 m (5 ft 10 in)	Alexandria	(Egypt)
F	12	Farida Abdelnabi	29 – 23 July 1996	1.79 m (5 ft 10 in)	Al Ahly	(Egypt)
C	15	Raneem El-Gedawy	28 – 24 February 1997	1.86 m (6 ft 1 in)	Al Ahly	(Egypt)
F	23	Hala El-Shaarawy	32 – 18 January 1993	1.84 m (6 ft 0 in)	Alexandria	(Egypt)
F	33	Tamara Ibrahim	20 – 26 September 2004	1.84 m (6 ft 0 in)	Al Ahly	(Egypt)

Head coach

- (Spain) Julián Martínez

Assistant coach(es)

- (Egypt) Aliaa Gamal
- (Egypt) Ahmed Gomaa

Legend

- Club – describes last
  club before the tournament
- Age – describes age
  on 26 July 2025

== See also ==
- Egyptian Basketball Federation
- Egypt men's national basketball team
- Egypt women's national 3x3 team
- Egypt women's national under-19 basketball team
- Egypt women's national under-17 basketball team
