= Soraya Degheidy =

Egyptian basketball player

Egyptian FIBA AfroBasket Women's team Al Ahly Sporting Club
- Position: guard

Personal information
- Born: July 16, 1995

Soraya Degheidy (born July 16, 1995, in Cairo) is an Egyptian basketball athlete representing both the national women's basketball team and Al Ahly Sporting Club. She plays as a guard. She stands at a height of 5 feet 8 inches (172 cm).

== Career ==
=== National Team Senior ===
Sources:

- At the 2015 Afrobasket Women, she played 8 games, averaging 9.4 points, 1.1 rebounds, 2.5 assists, and an efficiency rating of 5.6.
- In the 2017 FIBA Women's Afrobasket, she played 12 games, averaging 15.3 points, 4.2 rebounds, 4.3 assists, and an efficiency rating of 13.5.
- During the 2019 FIBA Women's Afrobasket qualifiers, she participated in 5 games, averaging 12.2 points, 1.6 rebounds, 3 assists, and an efficiency rating of 9.
- In the 2019 FIBA Women's Afrobasket, she played 6 games, averaging 14.2 points, 3.3 rebounds, 1.7 assists, and an efficiency rating of 11.5.
- In the 2021 FIBA Women's Afrobasket – Qualifiers – Zone 5, she competed in 5 games, averaging 12.8 points, 0.8 rebounds, 3.6 assists, and an efficiency rating of 11.
- At the 2021 FIBA Women's AfroBasket, she played 6 games, averaging 15.2 points, 3.2 rebounds, 2.7 assists, and an efficiency rating of 13.8.
- During the 2023 FIBA Women's AfroBasket qualifiers, she participated in 5 games, averaging 13.6 points, 2.2 rebounds, 3.6 assists, and an efficiency rating of 11.8.
- In the 2023 FIBA Women's AfroBasket, she played 3 games, averaging 7 points, 2 rebounds, 2.7 assists, and an efficiency rating of 3.3.

- Overall, her cumulative averages for the national team senior level are 12.8 points, 2.3 rebounds, 3 assists, and an efficiency rating of 10.4.

=== National Team Youth ===
During the 2011 Afrobasket U16 Championship for Women, she played 7 games, averaging 18 points, with no rebounds, assists, or efficiency rating provided. Overall, her collective average for the national team youth level is 18 points, with no rebounds, assists, or efficiency rating provided.

=== Leagues ===
In the 2019 FIBA Africa Champions Cup Women – Final Round, playing for Al Ahly Sporting Club, she participated in 6 games, averaging 13 points, 2.2 rebounds, 2.7 assists, and an efficiency rating of 9.7. Overall, her total averages for league play are 13 points, 2.2 rebounds, 2.7 assists, and an efficiency rating of 9.7.
