= Cape Verde women's national basketball team =

Cape Verde
- FIBA ranking: 99 ▼1 (18 March 2026)
- Joined FIBA: 1988
- FIBA zone: FIBA Africa
- National federation: Cape Verde Basketball Federation
- Coach: Antonio Moreira

AfroBasket
- Appearances: 5
Home	Away

The Cape Verde women's national basketball team represents Cape Verde in international competitions. It is administered by the Federação Cabo-verdiana de Basquetebol.

== African Championship record ==
- 2005 – 7th
- 2007 – 9th
- 2013 – 9th
- 2019 – 9th
- 2021 – 10th

== Current roster ==
Roster for the 2021 Women's Afrobasket.

Cape Verde women's national basketball team roster
Players
Coaches

Pos.	No.	Name	Age – Date of birth	Height	Club	Ctr.
SG	4	Jade Leitão	38 – 13 July 1983	1.79 m (5 ft 10 in)
SG	5	Indira Evora	26 – 28 October 1994	1.74 m (5 ft 9 in)
F	6	Analeesia Fernandes	21 – 12 December 1999	1.78 m (5 ft 10 in)	Rhode Island College	(United States)
C	7	Joseana Vaz	21 – 2 March 2000	1.85 m (6 ft 1 in)	Gdessa Barreiro	(Portugal)
SF	8	Arlia Almeida	29 – 11 December 1991	1.72 m (5 ft 8 in)
PG	9	Monalisa Mendes	27 – 29 July 1994	1.72 m (5 ft 8 in)
SF	10	Jessica Vaz	18 – 6 December 2002	1.76 m (5 ft 9 in)
SG	11	Juvelina Bento	32 – 27 October 1988	1.75 m (5 ft 9 in)	Lady Rebels	(Cape Verde)
G	12	Vandell Andrade	28 – 20 April 1993	1.79 m (5 ft 10 in)	CDB Clarinos	(Spain)
F	13	Aylin Pires	32 – 8 June 1989	1.79 m (5 ft 10 in)	Lady Rebels	(Cape Verde)
PF	14	Ornela Livramento	31 – 15 April 1990	1.80 m (5 ft 11 in)	Rhode Island College	(United States)
C	15	Maria Correia	29 – 24 May 1992	1.84 m (6 ft 0 in)	Lady Rebels	(Cape Verde)

Head coach

- (Cape Verde) Antonio Moreira

Assistant coach(es)

- (Cape Verde) Edmilson Abreu
- (Cape Verde) Maria Costa

Legend

- Club – describes last
  club before the tournament
- Age – describes age
  on 18 September 2021
