= Kenya women's national basketball team =

Kenya
- FIBA ranking: 78 ▼10 (8 August 2025)
- Joined FIBA: 1965
- FIBA zone: FIBA Africa
- National federation: Kenya Basketball Association
- Coach: George Mayienga
- Nickname: Lionesses

World Cup
- Appearances: 1

AfroBasket Women
- Appearances: 7
- Medals: Silver: (1993)
Home	Away

The Kenya women's national basketball team represents Kenya in international competitions. Internationally they are known as the Kenyan Lionesses. It is administrated by the Kenya Basketball Federation (KBF).

== African Championship record ==
- 1986 – 5th
- 1993 – 2nd
- 1997 – 4th
- 2007 – 12th
- 2013 – 10th
- 2019 – 11th
- 2021 – 9th

== Team ==
=== Current roster ===
Roster for the 2021 Women's Afrobasket.

Kenya women's national basketball team roster
Players
Coaches

Pos.	No.	Name	Age – Date of birth	Height	Club	Ctr.
G	4	Jemimah Omondi	25 – 15 November 1995	1.68 m (5 ft 6 in)	Sprite Storms	(Kenya)
SG	5	Melissa Otieno	29 – 3 July 1992	1.76 m (5 ft 9 in)	Equity Bank	(Kenya)
PG	6	Natalie Mwangale	28 – 7 September 1993	1.65 m (5 ft 5 in)	Kenya Ports Authority	(Kenya)
G	7	Georgia Otieno	29 – 12 June 1992	1.70 m (5 ft 7 in)	Ubumwe BBC	(Rwanda)
PF	10	Christine Akinyi	23 – 20 October 1997	1.98 m (6 ft 6 in)	Zetech University	(United States)
SF	11	Selina Okumu	28 – 11 August 1993	1.73 m (5 ft 8 in)	Kenya Ports Authority	(Kenya)
SG	12	Rose Ouma	36 – 6 November 1984	1.78 m (5 ft 10 in)	Al-Nasr	(United Arab Emirates)
C	13	Mercy Wanyama	29 – 14 January 1992	1.85 m (6 ft 1 in)	A. D. Cortegada	(Spain)
PF	14	Vilma Owino	28 – 18 August 1993	1.90 m (6 ft 3 in)	Kenya Ports Authority	(Kenya)
PF	15	Ivy Opicho	22 – 15 July 1999	1.83 m (6 ft 0 in)	Strathmore University	(Kenya)
SF	30	Victoria Reynolds	23 – 27 November 1997	1.78 m (5 ft 10 in)	William & Mary Tribe	(United States)
PF	45	Brenda Wasuda	32 – 7 May 1989	1.83 m (6 ft 0 in)	Seattle Redhawks	(United States)

Head coach

- (Kenya) George Mayienga

Assistant coach(es)

- (Kenya) Jacob Opel

Legend

- Club – describes last
  club before the tournament
- Age – describes age
  on 18 September 2021

=== Head coach position ===
- (Kenya) George Mayienga – 2021–present

=== 2023 FIBA Women's AfroBasket Qualifiers ===
From 14 till 19 February the Kenyan women's team competed in the 2023 FIBA Women's AfroBaskt Qualifiers in Kampala, Uganda. The team finished with 4 wins and 1 loss, coming third in the tournament. Unfortunately they did not progress to the 2023 FIBA Women's AfroBasket, set to be held later this year in Kigali, Rwanda from 28 July till 6 August 2023.

== See also ==
- Kenya women's national under-19 basketball team
- Kenya women's national under-17 basketball team
- Kenya women's national 3x3 team
