= Burkina Faso women's national basketball team =

Burkina Faso
- FIBA ranking: ▲ (8 August 2025)
- Joined FIBA: 1964
- FIBA zone: FIBA Africa
- National federation: Fédération Burkinabe de Basketball

Olympic Games
- Appearances: None

World Cup
- Appearances: None

FIBA Africa Championship for Women
- Appearances: None
Home	Away

The Burkina Faso women's national basketball team is a national basketball team of Burkina Faso, governed by the Fédération Burkinabe de Basketball.

Its last appearance was at the 2013 FIBA Africa Championship for Women qualification stage.

== See also ==
- Burkina Faso women's national under-19 basketball team
- Burkina Faso women's national under-17 basketball team
