= Alexandra Green (basketball) =

French-Cameroonian basketball player

No. 0 – FAP Basketball
- Position: point guard

Personal information
- Born: June 16, 1992 (age 34) Dallas Texas, U.S.
- Listed height: 5 ft 6 in (1.68 m)

Career information
- High school: Bishop Lynch High School
- College: Stanford University
Medals
Women's basketball
Representing Cameroon
AfroBasket
Bronze medal – third place	2021 Cameroon

Alexander Green (born June 16, 1992) is a Cameroonian basketball player. She plays professionally for FAP Basketball and the Cameroon national basketball team.

== Club career ==
Green participated in the 2019 FIBA Africa Women's Clubs Champions Cup in Egypt, with the Cameroonian side FAP basketball, she averaged 14 points, 5 rebounds and 3 assists.

== High school ==
Green graduated from Bishop Lynch High School Dallas, Texas in 2011. She was the captain of the basketball team as a junior and a senior. She helped lead the team to three straight TAPPS 5A state titles from 2008 to 2010. Missed her senior season in November 2010 because she suffered a torn ACL.

== College ==
Green went to Stanford University and her position in the basketball team was a guard. As a sophomore she averaged 1.0 point over 28 appearances, including two starts.

In her junior year she missed the NCAA Tournament following an ACL tear in practicing for the tournament in March 2015. She also averaged 1.9 points, 0.8 rebounds and 0.8 assists while appearing in nine nonconference game as a junior.

In her senior year she missed the first seven games while rehabbing from an ACL tear suffered in practice, made her first appearance of the season at Texas (12/13). Played 59 total minutes in 17 games and scored five points, nine rebounds and handed out three assists.

== National team Career ==
Green participated in the 2019 Women's Afrobasket representing the Cameroon Women's National team. She averaged 6 points 2.7 rebounds and 3 assists. She won bronze medal with the team while participating in the 2021 Women's Afrobasket. She averaged 5.4 points, 4.4 rebounds and 5.2 assists.
