= Bintou Diémé =

French-Senegalese basketball player

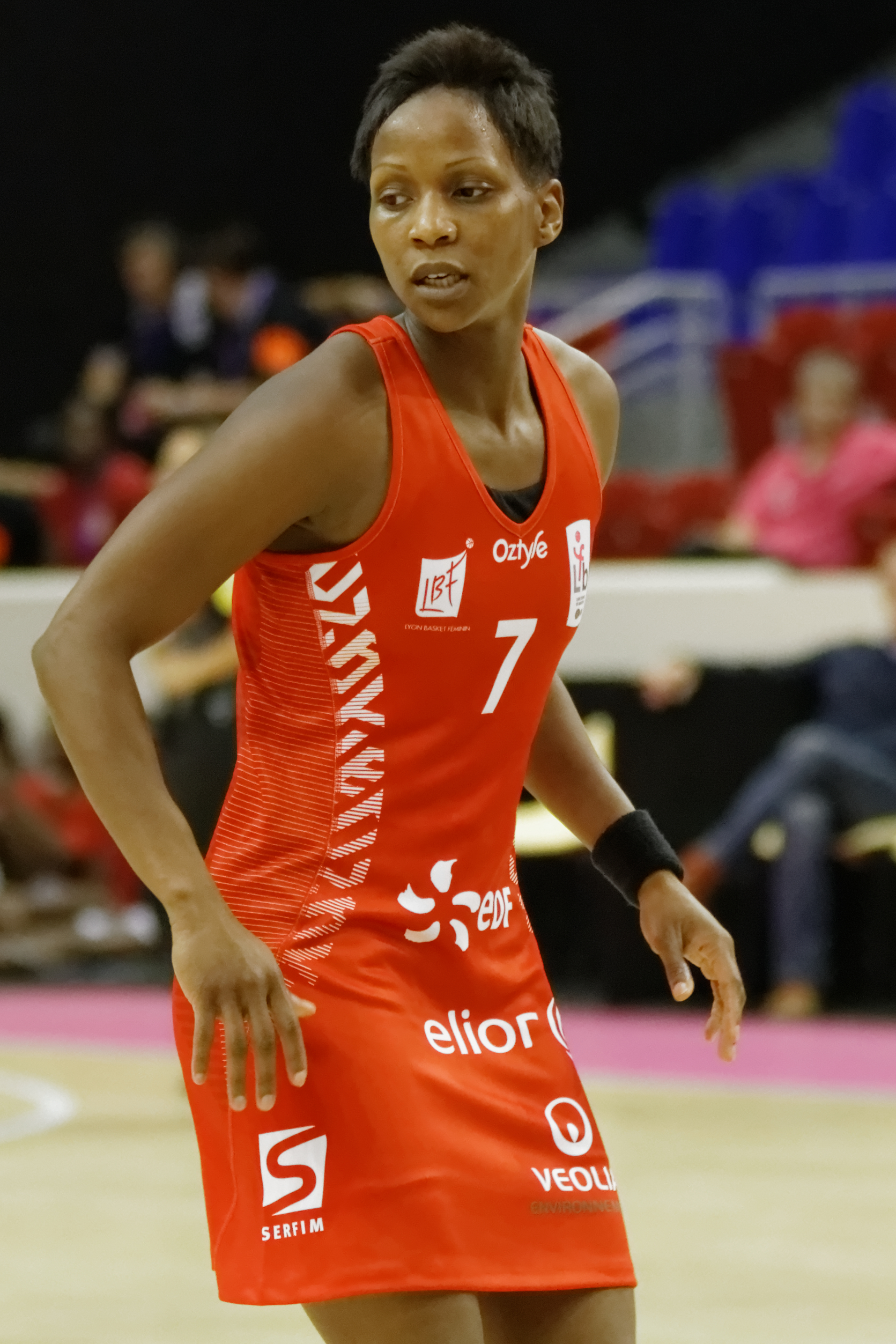

No. 7 – Hainaut
- Position: Point guard
- League: LFB

Personal information
- Born: 1 February 1984 (age 42) Évreux, France
- Listed height: 1.67 m (5 ft 6 in)
- Listed weight: 58 kg (128 lb)

Career information
- WNBA draft: 2006: undrafted

Biniou Diémé-Marizy (born 1 February 1984) is a French-Senegalese basketball player for Saint-Amand Hainaut Basket.
