= Mercy Wanyama =

Kenyan basketball player (born 1992)

Mercy Wanyama (born 14 January 1992) is a Kenyan basketball player. She currently plays professionally in Spain.

== Early years and education ==
Mercy Wanyama was born on 14 January 1992. She is a Langata High School alumnus and Shiners Girls in Nakuru . Mercy school at St.Peters in her lower-level classes

== Career ==
Wanyama represented Kenya Basketball Federation's Women premier league, and has played for the Equity Hawks from 2016 until 2018 where she won the MVP at the national league and the club qualifiers.She also played for a local club- MTM Storms. In 2018, she signed for ADBA Avilés, a Spanish team.Then later Moved to AD Cortegada LF2 team in Spain where she is currently. In the start if 22–23 season she won the special MVP award after bagging 23points and 12 rebound hitting a high Val of 43.

== Personal life ==
She is the younger sibling of Harambee stars captain Victor Wanyama, and ex-international McDonald Mariga; their father is a former AFC Leopard player.
