= 2018 FIBA Women's Basketball World Cup final =

2018 FIBA Women's Basketball World Cup Final
- Event: 2018 FIBA Women's Basketball World Cup
Australia	United States
(Australia)	(United States)
56	73
	1	2	3	4	Total
Australia	15	12	11	18	56
United States	20	15	26	12	73
- Date: 30 September 2018
- Venue: Tenerife Sports Pavilion Santiago Martin, San Cristóbal de La Laguna
- Coaches: Sandy Brondello (AUS); Dawn Staley (USA)
- Referees: Antonio Conde (ESP); Yu Jung (TPE); Yohan Rosso (FRA)
- Attendance: 3,715

The 2018 FIBA Women's Basketball World Cup Final was a basketball game which took place on 30 September 2018 at Tenerife Sports Pavilion Santiago Martin in San Cristóbal de La Laguna, Spain, to determine the winner of the 2018 FIBA Women's Basketball World Cup.

This was the first time the United States and Australia played against each other in a World Cup Final. Their last game against each other at World Cup level came in 2014, with the United States taking an 82–70 victory.

Team USA won again, this time 73–56, to win their third straight and tenth overall title.

== Road to the final ==
Australia
Round
United States
Opponent
Result
Group stage
Opponent
Result
Nigeria
86–68
Match 1
Senegal
87–67
Argentina
84–43
Match 2
China
100–88
Turkey
90–64
Match 3
Latvia
102–76

Pos	Team	Pld	W	L	PF	PA	PD	Pts	Qualification
1	Australia	3	3	0	260	175	+85	6	Quarterfinals
2	Nigeria	3	2	1	217	224	−7	5	Qualification round
3	Turkey	3	1	2	195	201	−6	4	Qualification round
4	Argentina	3	0	3	150	222	−72	3	

Source: FIBA
Rules for classification: 1) Points; 2) Head-to-head results; 3) Points difference; 4) Points scored.
Final standing

Pos	Team	Pld	W	L	PF	PA	PD	Pts	Qualification
1	United States	3	3	0	289	231	+58	6	Quarterfinals
2	China	3	2	1	227	227	0	5	Qualification round
3	Senegal	3	1	2	203	231	−28	4	Qualification round
4	Latvia	3	0	3	206	236	−30	3	

Source: FIBA
Rules for classification: 1) Points; 2) Head-to-head results; 3) Points difference; 4) Points scored.
Opponent
Result
Knockout stage
Opponent
Result
China
83–42
Quarter-finals
Nigeria
71–40
Spain
72–66
Semifinals
Belgium
93–77

=== Australia ===
Australia qualified by finishing second in the 2017 FIBA Asia Women's Cup. They were drawn into Group B with Argentina, Nigeria and Turkey.

=== United States ===
The Americans qualified by virtue of being the defending Olympic champions, after defeating Spain in the 2016 gold medal game. They were drawn into Group D with China, Latvia and Senegal.

== Match details ==
This was the eleventh meeting between Australia and the United States in the World Cup, with the USA leading the head-to-head 10–0. It was the first meeting between the two in a World Cup final.

The teams entered the game with an even deeper familiarity with one another due to extensive WNBA connections, which went beyond the fact that many USA and Australian players had played in the league's 2018 season. At match time, Australia head coach Sandy Brondello was also head coach of the Phoenix Mercury, then home to Australia's Stephanie Talbot and Americans Brittney Griner and Diana Taurasi. Rebecca Allen (Australia) and Tina Charles (USA) were New York Liberty teammates in that season. Five individuals who played significant roles in the Seattle Storm's victory in the 2018 WNBA Finals were involved in this game—American players Sue Bird, Jewell Loyd, and Breanna Stewart, Australian player Sami Whitcomb, and Storm head coach and USA assistant Dan Hughes.

30 September 2018
20:00

Boxscore

Australia	56–73	United States
Scoring by quarter: 15–20, 12–15, 11–26, 18–12
Pts: Smith 10; Rebs: Cambage 14; Asts: O'Hea 4		Pts: Griner 15; Rebs: Stewart 8 Asts: Bird 5

Tenerife Sports Pavilion Santiago Martin, San Cristóbal de La Laguna
Attendance: 3,715
Referees: Antonio Conde (ESP), Yu Jung (TPE), Yohan Rosso (FRA)

Australia
United States

Starters:			Pts.	Rebs.	Asts.
G	10	Katie-Rae Ebzery	6	2	1
G/F	6	Stephanie Talbot	4	3	0
F	9	Rebecca Allen	2	3	1
C	15	Cayla George	0	4	0
C	8	Liz Cambage	7	14	1
Reserves:
G/F	4	Jenna O'Hea	6	0	4
G	7	Tess Madgen	4	3	2
F	11	Alanna Smith	10	0	1
C	12	Alexandra Bunton	5	3	0
F	13	Eziyoda Magbegor	6	4	0
G	14	Tessa Lavey	3	1	0
G	32	Sami Whitcomb	3	6	3
Head coach:
(Australia) Sandy Brondello

Australia	Statistic	United States
18/45 (40.0%)	2-pt field goals	19/52 (36.5%)
4/22 (18.2%)	3-pt field goals	6/19 (31.6%)
8/12 (66.7%)	Free throws	17/23 (73.9%)
14	Offensive rebounds	14
35	Defensive rebounds	32
49	Total rebounds	46
13	Assists	18
19	Turnovers	12
4	Steals	7
8	Blocks	6
24	Fouls	16

Starters:			Pts.	Rebs.	Asts.
G	12	Diana Taurasi	13	3	4
G	6	Sue Bird	6	4	5
F	10	Breanna Stewart	10	8	2
C	14	Tina Charles	6	4	1
C	15	Brittney Griner	15	3	0
Reserves:
G	4	Jewell Loyd	9	3	3
G	5	Kelsey Plum	2	1	0
G	7	Layshia Clarendon	2	1	0
F	8	Morgan Tuck	2	0	0
F	9	A'ja Wilson	2	4	0
F	11	Elena Delle Donne	2	3	0
F	13	Nneka Ogwumike	4	3	3
Head coach:
(United States) Dawn Staley
