= 2018 FIBA Women's Basketball World Cup final round =

The final round of the 2018 FIBA Women's Basketball World Cup took place from 26 to 30 September 2018.

== Qualified teams ==
The group winners qualified for the quarterfinals while the runners-up and third placed teams advanced to the qualification round.

Group	Winners	Runners-up	Third place
A	Canada	France	Greece
B	Australia	Nigeria	Turkey
C	Belgium	Spain	Japan
D	United States	China	Senegal

== Bracket ==
Qualification round
26 September
Spain	63
Senegal	48
26 September
China	87
Japan	81
26 September
France	78
Turkey	61
26 September
Nigeria	57
Greece	56

Quarterfinals
28 September
Canada	53
Spain	68
28 September
Australia	83
China	42
28 September
Belgium	86
France	65
28 September
United States	71
Nigeria	40

Semifinals
29 September
Spain	66
Australia	72
29 September
Belgium	77
United States	93

Final
30 September
Australia	56
United States	73
Third place
30 September
Spain	67
Belgium	60

5–8th place

5–8th place semifinals
29 September
Canada	71
China	76
29 September
France	84
Nigeria	62

Fifth place
30 September
China	67
France	81
Seventh place
30 September
Canada	73
Nigeria	72

== Qualification round ==
=== China vs Japan ===
26 September 2018
11:30

Boxscore

China	87–81	Japan
Scoring by quarter: 19–25, 27–19, 21–13, 20–24
Pts: Shao, Yang 16; Rebs: Huang 9 Asts: Huang, Li Yua. 7		Pts: Motohashi 25; Rebs: Miyazawa 9 Asts: Motohashi 7

Palacio Municipal de Deportes, Santa Cruz de Tenerife
Attendance: 1,160
Referees: Yohan Rosso (FRA), Maj Forsberg (DEN), Georgios Poursanidis (GRE)

=== Nigeria vs Greece ===
26 September 2018
14:00

Boxscore

Nigeria	57–56	Greece
Scoring by quarter: 15–15, 16–11, 17–11, 9–19
Pts: Akhator, Kalu 14; Rebs: Akhator 13; Asts: Elonu, Kalu 4		Pts: Fasoula 18; Rebs: Fasoula 12; Asts: Kaltsidou 5

Palacio Municipal de Deportes, Santa Cruz de Tenerife
Attendance: 479
Referees: Omar Bermúdez (MEX), Daniel García (VEN), James Boyer (AUS)

=== France vs Turkey ===
26 September 2018
17:30

Boxscore

France	78–61	Turkey
Scoring by quarter: 19–10, 19–17, 20–20, 20–14
Pts: Gruda 20; Rebs: Gruda 7 Asts: Epoupa 8		Pts: Hollingsworth 19; Rebs: Hollingsworth 8 Asts: Alben 5

Tenerife Sports Pavilion Santiago Martin, San Cristóbal de La Laguna
Attendance: 832
Referees: Manuel Mazzoni (ITA), Maripier Malo (CAN), Takaki Kato (JPN)

=== Spain vs Senegal ===
26 September 2018
20:00

Boxscore

Spain	63–48	Senegal
Scoring by quarter: 17–18, 17–16, 12–6, 17–8
Pts: Ndour 14; Rebs: Nicholls 13; Asts: Palau 4		Pts: Thiam 10; Rebs: Diarra 7 Asts: Diouf 3

Tenerife Sports Pavilion Santiago Martin, San Cristóbal de La Laguna
Attendance: 3,142
Referees: Julio Anaya (PAN), Natalia Cuello (DOM), Yener Yılmaz (TUR)

== Quarterfinals ==
=== United States vs Nigeria ===
28 September 2018
11:30

Boxscore

United States	71–40	Nigeria
Scoring by quarter: 9–17, 18–6, 19–12, 25–5
Pts: Stewart 19; Rebs: Charles 15; Asts: Bird, Stewart 5		Pts: Akhator, Kalu 8 Rebs: Imovbioh 9 Asts: Kalu 7

Tenerife Sports Pavilion Santiago Martin, San Cristóbal de La Laguna
Attendance: 1,819
Referees: Georgios Poursanidis (GRE), Arnaud Kom Njilo (CMR), Ye Nan (CHN)

=== Australia vs China ===
28 September 2018
14:00

Boxscore

Australia	83–42	China
Scoring by quarter: 24–7, 18–11, 19–16, 22–8
Pts: Cambage 20; Rebs: Cambage 9 Asts: Talbot 5		Pts: Li Yue. 12; Rebs: Han, Li Yue. 6 Asts: Li Yua., Wang S. 3

Tenerife Sports Pavilion Santiago Martin, San Cristóbal de La Laguna
Attendance: 1,344
Referees: Amy Bonner (USA), Alexis Mercado (PUR), Daniel García (VEN)

=== Belgium vs France ===
28 September 2018
17:30

Boxscore

Belgium	86–65	France
Scoring by quarter: 20–17, 33–14, 14–17, 19–17
Pts: K. Mestdagh 23; Rebs: Meesseman 9 Asts: Allemand 13		Pts: Johannès 17; Rebs: Gruda 10; Asts: four players 3

Tenerife Sports Pavilion Santiago Martin, San Cristóbal de La Laguna
Attendance: 1,879
Referees: Antonio Conde (ESP), Julio Anaya (PAN), Takaki Kato (JPN)

=== Canada vs Spain ===
28 September 2018
20:00

Boxscore

Canada	53–68	Spain
Scoring by quarter: 16–13, 11–16, 23–18, 3–21
Pts: Nurse 15; Rebs: Gaucher 7 Asts: Gaucher 3		Pts: Ndour 16; Rebs: Nicholls, Torrens 7 Asts: Palau 5

Tenerife Sports Pavilion Santiago Martin, San Cristóbal de La Laguna
Attendance: 3,218
Referees: Yohan Rosso (FRA), Maj Forsbger (DEN), Omar Bermúdez (MEX)

== 5–8th place semifinals ==
=== France vs Nigeria ===
29 September 2018
11:30

Boxscore

France	84–62	Nigeria
Scoring by quarter: 18–20, 22–14, 23–10, 21–18
Pts: Ciak 16; Rebs: three players 5 Asts: Époupa 6		Pts: Elonu 15; Rebs: Akhator 6 Asts: Kalu 5

Tenerife Sports Pavilion Santiago Martin, San Cristóbal de La Laguna
Attendance: 549
Referees: Luis Castillo (ESP), Amy Bonner (USA), Andreia Silva (BRA)

=== Canada vs China ===
29 September 2018
14:00

Boxscore

Canada	71–76	China
Scoring by quarter: 19–16, 29–18, 14–24, 9–18
Pts: Nurse 18; Rebs: Achonwa, Plouffe 7 Asts: Langlois 4		Pts: Li M. 18; Rebs: Han 9 Asts: Li Yuan 6

Tenerife Sports Pavilion Santiago Martin, San Cristóbal de La Laguna
Attendance: 692
Referees: Yener Yılmaz (TUR), Jasmina Juras (SRB), James Boyer (AUS)

== Semifinals ==
=== Belgium vs United States ===
29 September 2018
17:30

Boxscore

Belgium	77–93	United States
Scoring by quarter: 26–21, 13–19, 18–33, 20–20
Pts: Meesseman 23; Rebs: Meesseman 6 Asts: Allemand 12		Pts: Taurasi 26; Rebs: Charles, Stewart 7 Asts: Bird 7

Tenerife Sports Pavilion Santiago Martin, San Cristóbal de La Laguna
Attendance: 2,595
Referees: Yohan Rosso (FRA), Yu Jung (TPE), Daniel García (VEN)

=== Spain vs Australia ===
29 September 2018
20:00

Boxscore

Spain	66–72	Australia
Scoring by quarter: 15–23, 20–11, 23–16, 8–22
Pts: Ndour 17; Rebs: three players 5 Asts: Palau 8		Pts: Cambage 33; Rebs: Cambage 15; Asts: Talbot 8

Tenerife Sports Pavilion Santiago Martin, San Cristóbal de La Laguna
Attendance: 3,976
Referees: Manuel Mazzoni (ITA), Natalia Cuello (DOM), Takaki Kato (JPN)

== Seventh place game ==
30 September 2018
11:30

Boxscore

Canada	73–72	Nigeria
Scoring by quarter: 21–17, 9–18, 19–19, 24–18
Pts: Nurse 17; Rebs: Raincock-Ekunwe 6 Asts: Nurse, Raincock-Ekunwe 3		Pts: Nyingifa 17; Rebs: Akhator 11; Asts: Nyingifa 5

Tenerife Sports Pavilion Santiago Martin, San Cristóbal de La Laguna
Attendance: 326
Referees: Georgios Poursanidis (GRE), Duan Zhu (CHN), Nicolas Fernandes (TAH)

== Fifth place game ==
30 September 2018
14:00

Boxscore

China	67–81	France
Scoring by quarter: 27–19, 9–18, 14–24, 17–20
Pts: Shao 16; Rebs: Sun 9 Asts: Li Yua. 6		Pts: Gruda 16; Rebs: Chartereau 6 Asts: Johannès, Michel 4

Tenerife Sports Pavilion Santiago Martin, San Cristóbal de La Laguna
Attendance: 653
Referees: Julio Anaya (PAN), Snehal Bendke (IND), Maripier Malo (CAN)

== Third place game ==
30 September 2018
17:30

Boxscore

Spain	67–60	Belgium
Scoring by quarter: 15–15, 17–12, 23–16, 12–17
Pts: Xargay 17; Rebs: Nicholls 10; Asts: Palau 5		Pts: Meesseman 24; Rebs: Meesseman 9 Asts: Allemand 8

Tenerife Sports Pavilion Santiago Martin, San Cristóbal de La Laguna
Attendance: 3,514
Referees: Omar Bermúdez (MEX), Maj Forsberg (DEN), Daniel García (VEN)

== Final ==
30 September 2018
20:00

Boxscore

Australia	56–73	United States
Scoring by quarter: 15–20, 12–15, 11–26, 18–12
Pts: Smith 10; Rebs: Cambage 14; Asts: O'Hea 4		Pts: Griner 15; Rebs: Stewart 8 Asts: Bird 5

Tenerife Sports Pavilion Santiago Martin, San Cristóbal de La Laguna
Attendance: 3,715
Referees: Antonio Conde (ESP), Yu Jung (TPE), Yohan Rosso (FRA)
