= 2020 FIBA Women's Olympic Qualifying Tournaments – Belgrade =

2020 FIBA World Olympic Qualifying Tournament for Women
Belgrade, Serbia

Tournament details
- Host country: Serbia
- Dates: 6–9 February
- Teams: 4 (from 3 federations)
- Venue: 1 (in 1 host city)

Final positions
- Champions: United States

Tournament statistics
- MVP: (United States) Nneka Ogwumike
- Top scorer: (Nigeria) Kalu (16.0)
- Top rebounds: (United States) Wilson (7.3)
- Top assists: (United States) Gray (7.3)
- PPG (Team): United States (96.0)
- RPG (Team): United States (44.7)
- APG (Team): United States (33.0)

Official website
- WOQT Serbia

The 2020 FIBA Women's Olympic Qualifying Tournament in Belgrade was one of four 2020 FIBA Women's Olympic Qualifying Tournaments. The tournament was held in Belgrade, Serbia, from 6 to 9 February 2020.

Serbia and Nigeria qualified for the Olympics, alongside the United States, who were pre-qualified as the 2018 FIBA World Cup winner.

== Teams ==
Team	Qualification	Date of qualification	FIBA World Ranking
Serbia	3rd at the EuroBasket Women 2019	4 July 2019	7th
United States	1st at the 2018 FIBA Women's Basketball World Cup	30 September 2018	1st
Nigeria	The two best teams at the Africa pre-qualifying tournament	17 November 2019	16th
Mozambique	The two best teams at the Africa pre-qualifying tournament	17 November 2019	43rd

== Venue ==
Belgrade	2020 FIBA Women's Olympic Qualifying Tournaments – Belgrade (Serbia)
Aleksandar Nikolić Hall	2020 FIBA Women's Olympic Qualifying Tournaments – Belgrade (Serbia)
Capacity: 8,000	2020 FIBA Women's Olympic Qualifying Tournaments – Belgrade (Serbia)

== Standings ==
Pos	Team	Pld	W	L	PF	PA	PD	Pts	Qualification
1	United States (Note: The United States has already qualified as the World Cup winners.)	3	3	0	288	189	+99	6	
2	Serbia (H)	3	2	1	215	200	+15	5	Summer Olympics
3	Nigeria	3	1	2	220	197	+23	4	Summer Olympics
4	Mozambique	3	0	3	148	285	−137	3	

Source: FIBA
Rules for classification: 1) Points; 2) Head-to-head results; 3) Points difference; 4) Points scored.
(H) Hosts

== Results ==
All times are local (UTC+1).

6 February 2020
17:00

Boxscore

Nigeria	85–51	Mozambique
Scoring by quarter: 18–19, 23–9, 25–13, 19–10
Pts: Amukamara 14; Rebs: Akhator 7 Asts: Kalu 5		Pts: Dongue 16; Rebs: Dongue 5 Asts: Mucauro 5

Aleksandar Nikolić Hall, Belgrade
Referees: Zdenko Tomašovič (SVK), Yevgeniy Mikheyev (KAZ), Viola Györgyi (NOR)

6 February 2020
20:00

Boxscore

United States	88–69	Serbia
Scoring by quarter: 20–14, 22–20, 28–13, 18–22
Pts: Wilson 16; Rebs: Wilson 7 Asts: Bird, Loyd 8		Pts: Brooks, Dabović 13; Rebs: Vasić 6 Asts: Bojović 6

Aleksandar Nikolić Hall, Belgrade
Referees: Andris Aunkrogers (LAT), Carsten Straube (GER), Duan Zhu (CHN)

8 February 2020
17:00

Boxscore

Serbia	70–64	Nigeria
Scoring by quarter: 21–22, 22–12, 16–12, 11–18
Pts: Vasić 21; Rebs: Jovanović, Vasić 7 Asts: Brooks 5		Pts: Kalu 20; Rebs: Elonu 6 Asts: Nyingifa 2

Aleksandar Nikolić Hall, Belgrade
Referees: Andris Aunkrogers (LAT), Yevgeniy Mikheyev (KAZ), Viola Györgyi (NOR)

8 February 2020
20:00

Boxscore

Mozambique	49–124	United States
Scoring by quarter: 10–36, 12–23, 12–33, 15–32
Pts: Dongue 10; Rebs: Dongue 9 Asts: four players 2		Pts: Ogwumike 24; Rebs: Griner, Ogwumike 9 Asts: Gray 12

Aleksandar Nikolić Hall, Belgrade
Referees: Zdenko Tomašovič (SVK), Carsten Straube (GER), Cherubin Leslie (MRI)

9 February 2020
17:00

Boxscore

Serbia	76–48	Mozambique
Scoring by quarter: 16–21, 18–7, 26–14, 16–6
Pts: Dabović 12; Rebs: Brooks 9 Asts: Dabović, Miljković 6		Pts: Cossa 21; Rebs: Seda 10; Asts: Mucauro 5

Aleksandar Nikolić Hall, Belgrade
Referees: Andris Aunkrogers (LAT), Carsten Straube (GER), Duan Zhu (CHN)

9 February 2020
20:00

Boxscore

Nigeria	71–76	United States
Scoring by quarter: 21–20, 19–6, 17–24, 14–26
Pts: Kalu 17; Rebs: Mohammed 9 Asts: Kalu 8		Pts: Griner 18; Rebs: Wilson 8 Asts: Gray 7

Aleksandar Nikolić Hall, Belgrade
Referees: Zdenko Tomašovič (SVK), Yevgeniy Mikheyev (KAZ), Cherubin Leslie (MRI)

== Statistics and awards ==
=== Statistical leaders ===
Players

Points

Name	PPG
(Nigeria) Ezinne Kalu	16.0
(United States) Brittney Griner	15.3
(United States) Nneka Ogwumike	13.7
(United States) A'ja Wilson	12.7
(Serbia) Jelena Brooks	12.0

Rebounds

Name	RPG
(United States) A'ja Wilson	7.3
(United States) Brittney Griner	6.3
(United States) Nneka Ogwumike	6.0
(Mozambique) Leia Dongue	5.3
(Nigeria) Evelyn Akhator	5.3
(Serbia) Sonja Vasić	5.3

Assists

Name	APG
(United States) Chelsea Gray	7.3
(United States) Sue Bird	7.0
(United States) Jewell Loyd	5.0
(Nigeria) Ezinne Kalu	4.3
(Mozambique) Ingvild Mucauro	4.0
(Serbia) Ana Dabović	4.0
(United States) Skylar Diggins	4.0

Blocks

Name	BPG
(Mozambique) Tamara Seda	1.7
(United States) Breanna Stewart	1.5
(United States) Brittney Griner	1.3
(United States) A'ja Wilson	1.3
(Nigeria) Evelyn Akhator	1.0
(Nigeria) Victoria Macaulay	1.0
(Serbia) Tina Krajišnik	1.0
(United States) Sylvia Fowles	1.0

Steals

Name	SPG
(Nigeria) Promise Amukamara	3.0
(Serbia) Nevena Jovanović	2.7
(Nigeria) Ezinne Kalu	2.3
(Serbia) Jelena Brooks	2.3
(Nigeria) Adaora Elonu	2.0
(Serbia) Ana Dabović	2.0

Teams

Points

Team	PPG
United States	96.0
Nigeria	73.3
Serbia	71.7
Mozambique	49.3

Rebounds

Name	RPG
United States	44.7
Serbia	39.3
Nigeria	36.7
Mozambique	28.3

Assists

Name	APG
United States	33.0
Serbia	20.0
Nigeria	14.3
Mozambique	12.3

Blocks

Name	BPG
United States	5.7
Nigeria	3.7
Serbia	3.3
Mozambique	2.3

Steals

Name	SPG
Nigeria	14.3
Serbia	11.7
Mozambique	7.0
United States	6.0

=== Awards ===
The all star-teams and MVP were announced on 9 February 2020.

All-Star Team
Guards	Forwards	Center
(Nigeria) Ezinne Kalu (Serbia) Ana Dabović	(Mozambique) Leia Dongue (United States) Nneka Ogwumike	(United States) A'ja Wilson
MVP: (United States) Nneka Ogwumike
