= 2018 FIBA Women's Basketball World Cup Group B =

Group B of the 2018 FIBA Women's Basketball World Cup took place from 22 to 25 September 2018. The group consisted of Argentina, Australia, Nigeria and Turkey.

The top team advanced to the quarterfinals while the second and third placed team played in a qualification round.

== Teams ==
| Team | Qualification | | Appearance | | | Best Performance | FIBA World Ranking | FIBA Zone Ranking |
| Team | Method | Date | Last | Total | Streak | Best Performance | FIBA World Ranking | FIBA Zone Ranking |
|---|---|---|---|---|---|---|---|---|
| Argentina | Women's AmeriCup | 12 August 2017 | 2010 | 9 | 1 | 6th Place (1953) | 16 | 5 |
| Australia | Women's Asia Cup | 27 July 2017 | 2014 | 15 | 14 | Champions (2006) | 4 | 1 |
| Nigeria | Women's Afrobasket | 26 August 2017 | 2006 | 2 | 1 | 16th Place (2006) | 42 | 4 |
| Turkey | EuroBasket Women | 24 June 2017 | 2014 | 2 | 2 | 4th Place (2014) | 7 | 4 |

== Standings ==
| Pos | Team | Pld | W | L | PF | PA | PD | Pts | Qualification |
|---|---|---|---|---|---|---|---|---|---|
| 1 | Australia | 3 | 3 | 0 | 260 | 175 | +85 | 6 | Quarterfinals |
| 2 | Nigeria | 3 | 2 | 1 | 217 | 224 | −7 | 5 | Qualification round |
| 3 | Turkey | 3 | 1 | 2 | 195 | 201 | −6 | 4 | Qualification round |
| 4 | Argentina | 3 | 0 | 3 | 150 | 222 | −72 | 3 | |

Source: FIBA
Rules for classification: 1) Points; 2) Head-to-head results; 3) Points difference; 4) Points scored.

== Matches ==
=== Australia vs Nigeria ===
22 September 2018
11:30

Boxscore

| Australia | 86–68 | Nigeria |
Scoring by quarter: 24–17, 18–14, 21–23, 23–14
| Pts: Cambage 34; Rebs: Cambage 12; Asts: George, Talbot 6 | | Pts: Akhator 21; Rebs: Elonu, Nyingifa 6 Asts: Amukamara 4 |

Tenerife Sports Pavilion Santiago Martin, San Cristóbal de La Laguna
Attendance: 422
Referees: Yener Yılmaz (TUR), Snehal Bendke (IND), Alexis Mercado (PUR)

=== Turkey vs Argentina ===
22 September 2018
14:00

Boxscore

| Turkey | 63–37 | Argentina |
Scoring by quarter: 19–11, 14–9, 18–4, 12–13
| Pts: Şenyürek 13; Rebs: Şenyürek 8 Asts: Cora 5 | | Pts: Rosset 12; Rebs: Burani 8 Asts: Gretter 4 |

Tenerife Sports Pavilion Santiago Martin, San Cristóbal de La Laguna
Attendance: 573
Referees: Omar Bermúdez (MEX), Maj Forsberg (DEN), Arnaud Kom Njilo (CMR)

=== Argentina vs Australia ===
23 September 2018
11:00

Boxscore

| Argentina | 43–84 | Australia |
Scoring by quarter: 5–21, 8–19, 11–28, 19–16
| Pts: Rosset 13; Rebs: Llorente 5 Asts: Boquete 3 | | Pts: Cambage 24; Rebs: Magbegor 8 Asts: Whitcomb 5 |

Palacio Municipal de Deportes, Santa Cruz de Tenerife
Attendance: 689
Referees: Takaki Kato (JPN), Yu Jung (TPE), Luis Castillo (ESP)

=== Nigeria vs Turkey ===
23 September 2018
20:30

Boxscore

| Nigeria | 74–68 | Turkey |
Scoring by quarter: 7–15, 22–17, 23–10, 22–26
| Pts: Ogoke 22; Rebs: Akhator 10; Asts: Kalu 5 | | Pts: Alben 15; Rebs: Hollingsworth, Şenyürek 6 Asts: Alben, Cora 3 |

Palacio Municipal de Deportes, Santa Cruz de Tenerife
Attendance: 643
Referees: James Boyer (AUS), Julio Anaya (PAN), Ye Nan (CHN)

=== Australia vs Turkey ===
25 September 2018
11:30

Boxscore

| Australia | 90–64 | Turkey |
Scoring by quarter: 32–19, 21–14, 22–16, 15–15
| Pts: Cambage 25; Rebs: Cambage, Bunton 7 Asts: Ebzery, George 5 | | Pts: Hollingsworth 11; Rebs: Hollingsworth 7 Asts: Alben 9 |

Tenerife Sports Pavilion Santiago Martin, San Cristóbal de La Laguna
Attendance: 1,805
Referees: Antonio Conde (ESP), Alexis Mercado (PUR), Daniel García (VEN)

=== Argentina vs Nigeria ===
25 September 2018
17:30

Boxscore

| Argentina | 70–75 | Nigeria |
Scoring by quarter: 13–19, 16–13, 19–19, 22–24
| Pts: Gretter 21; Rebs: Gretter, Llorente 7 Asts: four players 4 | | Pts: Amukamara 16; Rebs: Akhator 13; Asts: Kalu 4 |

Tenerife Sports Pavilion Santiago Martin, San Cristóbal de La Laguna
Attendance: 582
Referees: Natalia Cuello (DOM), Arnaud Kom Njilo (CMR), Andreia Silva (BRA)
