= 2018 FIBA Women's Basketball World Cup Group C =

Group C of the 2018 FIBA Women's Basketball World Cup took place from 22 to 25 September 2018. The group consisted of Belgium, Japan, Puerto Rico and Spain.

The top team advanced to the quarterfinals while the second and third placed team played in a qualification round.

== Teams ==
Team	Qualification		Appearance			Best Performance	FIBA World Ranking	FIBA Zone Ranking
Team	Method	Date	Last	Total	Streak	Best Performance	FIBA World Ranking	FIBA Zone Ranking
Belgium	EuroBasket Women	22 June 2017	—	1	1	Debut	78	23
Japan	Women's Asia Cup	27 July 2017	2014	13	3	Runners-up (1975)	13	2
Puerto Rico	Women's AmeriCup	13 August 2017	–	1	1	Debut	22	6
Spain	Host nation	16 December 2014	2014	7	7	Runners-up (2014)	2	1

== Standings ==
Pos	Team	Pld	W	L	PF	PA	PD	Pts	Qualification
1	Belgium	3	2	1	233	176	+57	5 (Note: Belgium 1–1, +7 PD; Spain 1–1, +4 PD; Japan 1–1, –11 PD)	Quarterfinals
2	Spain (H)	3	2	1	225	196	+29	5	Qualification round
3	Japan	3	2	1	217	220	−3	5	Qualification round
4	Puerto Rico	3	0	3	150	233	−83	3	

Source: FIBA
Rules for classification: 1) Points; 2) Head-to-head results; 3) Points difference; 4) Points scored.
(H) Hosts

== Matches ==
=== Japan vs Spain ===
22 September 2018
20:00

Boxscore

Japan	71–84	Spain
Scoring by quarter: 10–20, 11–19, 27–22, 23–23
Pts: Miyazawa 12; Rebs: Miyazawa 6 Asts: Motohashi 5		Pts: Xargay 15; Rebs: Nicholls 8 Asts: Palau 8

Tenerife Sports Pavilion Santiago Martin, San Cristóbal de La Laguna
Attendance: 4,146
Referees: Amy Bonner (USA), Natalia Cuello (DOM), James Boyer (AUS)

=== Puerto Rico vs Belgium ===
22 September 2018
20:30

Boxscore

Puerto Rico	36–86	Belgium
Scoring by quarter: 3–18, 3–30, 12–24, 18–14
Pts: O'Neill 12; Rebs: Gwathmey 7 Asts: Meléndez 2		Pts: Vanloo 17; Rebs: Meesseman 14; Asts: Carpréaux 7

Palacio Municipal de Deportes, Santa Cruz de Tenerife
Attendance: 619
Referees: Yohan Rosso (FRA), Harja Jaladri (INA), Duan Zhu (CHN)

=== Belgium vs Japan ===
23 September 2018
13:30

Boxscore

Belgium	75–77 (OT)	Japan
Scoring by quarter: 13–17, 19–18, 18–22, 18–11, Overtime: 7–9
Pts: Mestdagh 23; Rebs: Meesseman 18; Asts: Allemand 7		Pts: Takada 26; Rebs: Miyazawa, Takada 6 Asts: Fujioka 8

Palacio Municipal de Deportes, Santa Cruz de Tenerife
Attendance: 855
Referees: Omar Bermúdez (MEX), Maj Forsberg (DEN), Özlem Yalman (TUR)

=== Spain vs Puerto Rico ===
23 September 2018
20:00

Boxscore

Spain	78–53	Puerto Rico
Scoring by quarter: 8–15, 18–10, 22–10, 30–18
Pts: Ndour 22; Rebs: Gil 7 Asts: Palau 5		Pts: O'Neill 17; Rebs: Meléndez 8 Asts: three players 2

Tenerife Sports Pavilion Santiago Martin, San Cristóbal de La Laguna
Attendance: 3,157
Referees: Manuel Mazzoni (ITA), Snehal Bendke (IND), Daniel García (VEN)

=== Japan vs Puerto Rico ===
25 September 2018
11:00

Boxscore

Japan	69–61	Puerto Rico
Scoring by quarter: 23–15, 20–13, 10–17, 16–16
Pts: Miyazawa 15; Rebs: Miyazawa 14; Asts: Machida 7		Pts: Gwathmey 23; Rebs: O'Neill 9 Asts: Rosado 4

Palacio Municipal de Deportes, Santa Cruz de Tenerife
Attendance: 1,442
Referees: Georgios Poursanidis (GRE), Maripier Malo (CAN), Yener Yılmaz (TUR)

=== Belgium vs Spain ===
25 September 2018
20:00

Boxscore

Belgium	72–63	Spain
Scoring by quarter: 19–15, 20–17, 22–14, 11–17
Pts: Mestdagh 21; Rebs: Meesseman, Raman 8 Asts: Allemand 6		Pts: Torrens 16; Rebs: Nicholls 13; Asts: Palau 5

Tenerife Sports Pavilion Santiago Martin, San Cristóbal de La Laguna
Attendance: 3,416
Referees: Yohan Rosso (FRA), James Boyer (AUS), Nicolas Fernandes (TAH)
