= 2018 FIBA Women's Basketball World Cup Group D =

Group D of the 2018 FIBA Women's Basketball World Cup took place from 22 to 25 September 2018. The group consisted of China, Latvia, Senegal and the United States.

The top team advanced to the quarterfinals while the second and third placed team played in a qualification round.

== Teams ==
| Team | Qualification | | Appearance | | | Best Performance | FIBA World Ranking | FIBA Zone Ranking |
| Team | Method | Date | Last | Total | Streak | Best Performance | FIBA World Ranking | FIBA Zone Ranking |
|---|---|---|---|---|---|---|---|---|
| China | Women's Asia Cup | 27 July 2017 | 2014 | 10 | 10 | Runners-up (1994) | 10 | 1 |
| Latvia | EuroBasket Women | 24 June 2017 | — | 1 | 1 | Debut | 27 | 12 |
| Senegal | Women's Afrobasket | 26 August 2017 | 2010 | 8 | 1 | 12th Place (1979) | 17 | 1 |
| United States | Summer Olympic Games | 20 August 2016 | 2014 | 17 | 15 | Champions (1953, 1957, 1979, 1986, 1990, 1998, 2002, 2010, 2014) | 1 | 1 |

== Standings ==
| Pos | Team | Pld | W | L | PF | PA | PD | Pts | Qualification |
|---|---|---|---|---|---|---|---|---|---|
| 1 | United States | 3 | 3 | 0 | 289 | 231 | +58 | 6 | Quarterfinals |
| 2 | China | 3 | 2 | 1 | 227 | 227 | 0 | 5 | Qualification round |
| 3 | Senegal | 3 | 1 | 2 | 203 | 231 | −28 | 4 | Qualification round |
| 4 | Latvia | 3 | 0 | 3 | 206 | 236 | −30 | 3 | |

Source: FIBA
Rules for classification: 1) Points; 2) Head-to-head results; 3) Points difference; 4) Points scored.

== Matches ==
=== Latvia vs China ===
22 September 2018
11:00

Boxscore

| Latvia | 61–64 | China |
Scoring by quarter: 10–17, 20–14, 14–13, 17–20
| Pts: Šteinberga 16; Rebs: Šteinberga 11; Asts: Pulvere 5 | | Pts: Shao 15; Rebs: Han 10; Asts: Shao 5 |

Palacio Municipal de Deportes, Santa Cruz de Tenerife
Attendance: 700
Referees: Antonio Conde (ESP), Julio Anaya (PAN), Georgios Poursanidis (GRE)

=== United States vs Senegal ===
22 September 2018
18:00

Boxscore

| United States | 87–67 | Senegal |
Scoring by quarter: 18–17, 27–14, 20–17, 22–19
| Pts: Delle Donne 19; Rebs: three players 6 Asts: Taurasi 7 | | Pts: Sarr 18; Rebs: Sy 8 Asts: Diémé 4 |

Palacio Municipal de Deportes, Santa Cruz de Tenerife
Attendance: 1,450
Referees: Jasmina Juras (SRB), Yu Jung (TPE), Nicolas Fernandes (TAH)

=== Senegal vs Latvia ===
23 September 2018
14:00

Boxscore

| Senegal | 70–69 | Latvia |
Scoring by quarter: 15–19, 13–10, 22–23, 20–17
| Pts: Traoré 19; Rebs: Diarra 11; Asts: Traoré 4 | | Pts: Vītola 14; Rebs: Šteinberga 15; Asts: Dikaioulaku 5 |

Tenerife Sports Pavilion Santiago Martin, San Cristóbal de La Laguna
Attendance: 963
Referees: Georgios Poursanidis (GRE), Andreia Silva (BRA), Maripier Malo (CAN)

=== China vs United States ===
23 September 2018
18:00

Boxscore

| China | 88–100 | United States |
Scoring by quarter: 20–25, 19–23, 29–29, 20–23
| Pts: Han 20; Rebs: Sun 6 Asts: five players 3 | | Pts: Stewart 23; Rebs: three players 6 Asts: Clarendon, Taurasi 5 |

Palacio Municipal de Deportes, Santa Cruz de Tenerife
Attendance: 1,979
Referees: Yohan Rosso (FRA), Arnaud Kom Njilo (CMR), Yener Yılmaz (TUR)

=== Senegal vs China ===
25 September 2018
14:00

Boxscore

| Senegal | 66–75 | China |
Scoring by quarter: 8–10, 11–20, 28–22, 19–23
| Pts: Traoré 21; Rebs: Diop 7 Asts: Diémé 7 | | Pts: Li M. 15; Rebs: Li Yue. 11; Asts: Li Yua. 7 |

Tenerife Sports Pavilion Santiago Martin, San Cristóbal de La Laguna
Attendance: 808
Referees: Manuel Mazzoni (ITA), Harja Jaladri (INA), Maj Forsberg (DEN)

=== Latvia vs United States ===
25 September 2018
18:00

Boxscore

| Latvia | 76–102 | United States |
Scoring by quarter: 19–28, 23–24, 8–26, 26–24
| Pts: Šteinberga 30; Rebs: Vītola 10; Asts: Vītola 6 | | Pts: Charles 18; Rebs: Stewart 8 Asts: Clarendon 7 |

Palacio Municipal de Deportes, Santa Cruz de Tenerife
Attendance: 1,800
Referees: Yu Jung (TPE), Jasmina Juras (SRB), Julio Anaya (PAN)
