= 2018 FIBA Women's Basketball World Cup Group A =

Group A of the 2018 FIBA Women's Basketball World Cup took place from 22 to 25 September, 2018. The group consisted of Canada, France, Greece, and South Korea.

The top team advanced to the quarterfinals, while the second and third placed team played in a qualification round.

== Teams ==
Team	Qualification		Appearance			Best Performance	FIBA World Ranking	FIBA Zone Ranking
Team	Method	Date	Last	Total	Streak	Best Performance	FIBA World Ranking	FIBA Zone Ranking
Canada	Women's AmeriCup	12 August 2017	2014	11	4	3rd Place (1979, 1986)	6	2
France	EuroBasket Women	22 June 2017	2014	10	5	3rd Place (1953)	3	2
Greece	EuroBasket Women	22 June 2017	2010	2	1	11th Place (2010)	20	9
South Korea	Women's Asia Cup	27 July 2017	2014	15	15	Runners-up (1967, 1979)	15	3

== Standings ==
Pos	Team	Pld	W	L	PF	PA	PD	Pts	Qualification
1	Canada	3	3	0	234	173	+61	6	Quarterfinals
2	France	3	2	1	224	200	+24	5	Qualification round
3	Greece	3	1	2	179	204	−25	4	Qualification round
4	South Korea	3	0	3	169	229	−60	3	

Source: FIBA
Rules for classification: 1) Points; 2) Head-to-head results; 3) Points difference; 4) Points scored.

== Matches ==
=== South Korea vs France ===
22 September 2018
13:30

Boxscore

South Korea	58–89	France
Scoring by quarter: 23–18, 8–25, 12–23, 15–23
Pts: Park Ji-s. 15; Rebs: Park Ji-s. 8 Asts: Park Hy. 5		Pts: Johannès 19; Rebs: Ciak 19; Asts: Époupa, Miyem 4

Palacio Municipal de Deportes, Santa Cruz de Tenerife
Attendance: 479
Referees: Luis Castillo (ESP), Andreia Silva (BRA), Maripier Malo (CAN)

=== Greece vs Canada ===
22 September 2018
17:30

Boxscore

Greece	50–81	Canada
Scoring by quarter: 10–23, 15–28, 13–15, 12–15
Pts: Maltsi 14; Rebs: Spanou 6 Asts: Lymoura, Spanou 2		Pts: Gaucher 16; Rebs: Hamblin, Raincock-Ekunwe 8 Asts: Gaucher 5

Tenerife Sports Pavilion Santiago Martin, San Cristóbal de La Laguna
Attendance: 1,157
Referees: Manuel Mazzoni (ITA), Özlem Yalman (TUR), Takaki Kato (JPN)

=== Canada vs South Korea ===
23 September 2018
11:30

Boxscore

Canada	82–63	South Korea
Scoring by quarter: 18–10, 27–14, 16–16, 21–23
Pts: Nurse 29; Rebs: four players 6 Asts: Langlois 6		Pts: Park Ji-s. 23; Rebs: Park Ji-s. 9 Asts: Park H. 9

Tenerife Sports Pavilion Santiago Martin, San Cristóbal de La Laguna
Attendance: 589
Referees: Natalia Cuello (DOM), Harja Jaladri (INA), Nicolas Fernandes (TAH)

=== France vs Greece ===
23 September 2018
17:30

Boxscore

France	75–71	Greece
Scoring by quarter: 26–17, 12–19, 16–23, 21–12
Pts: Miyem 20; Rebs: Gruda 7 Asts: Johannès 6		Pts: Maltsi 28; Rebs: Kaltsidou, Spyridopoulou 5 Asts: Lymoura 4

Tenerife Sports Pavilion Santiago Martin, San Cristóbal de La Laguna
Attendance: 1,501
Referees: Antonio Conde (ESP), Amy Bonner (USA), Duan Zhu (CHN)

=== South Korea vs Greece ===
25 September 2018
13:30

Boxscore

South Korea	48–58	Greece
Scoring by quarter: 17–16, 11–9, 7–20, 13–13
Pts: Kang 10; Rebs: Park Ji-s. 9 Asts: Lim, Park Ji-s. 4		Pts: Spanou 13; Rebs: Spanou 12; Asts: Maltsi 5

Palacio Municipal de Deportes, Santa Cruz de Tenerife
Attendance: 508
Referees: Takaki Kato (JPN), Ye Nan (CHN), Luis Castillo

=== Canada vs France ===
25 September 2018
20:30

Boxscore

Canada	71–60	France
Scoring by quarter: 12–25, 14–11, 19–10, 26–14
Pts: Nurse 18; Rebs: Achonwa, Raincock-Ekunwe 10; Asts: Nurse 6		Pts: Gruda 14; Rebs: Gruda 8 Asts: Tchatchouang 5

Palacio Municipal de Deportes, Santa Cruz de Tenerife
Attendance: 1,215
Referees: Omar Bermúdez (MEX), Amy Bonner (USA), Duan Zhu (CHN)
