= AFA Sports =

Nigerian sports company

Coordinates: 45.5093°N 122.8299°W

- Company type: Private
- Industry: Athletic footwear and Apparel; Athletic and recreational products; Sports equipment
- Founded: November 30, 2016; 9 years ago
- Founder: Ugo Udezue
- Headquarters: Victoria Island, Lagos; Nigeria
- Products: Athletic footwear; Sports equipment
- Website: afasports.com

AFA Sports is a Nigerian company that is engaged in the design, development, manufacturing, marketing and sales of athletic and leisure footwear, apparel and accessories. It is a private company with its headquarters based in Victoria Island, Lagos, Nigeria.

== Origins and history ==
AFA means ‘Africa For Africa’. The company was started by Ugo Udezue, a former NBA Agent working with BDA Sports in United States. His original idea was to create a Basketball league that would cater for professional basketball players in Africa which lead to the establishment of the Continental Basketball League, CBL. What was actually unplanned was the birth of AFA Sports, which was borne out of the desire to meet the kit demand of the Continental Basketball League. However, the Nigerian National Basketball team D’Tigers had a major kitting challenge going into the Afro Basket 2017 competition and AFA became their jersey sponsors. This sponsorship was a major game changer for them.

== Sponsorship ==
=== Nigeria Male basketball Team (D’Tigers) ===
AFA sports was the jersey sponsor of the Nigeria Male basketball team, D’Tigers. On the 22nd of February 2018, AFA Sports officially released a new jersey for the Nigeria Senior Male basketball team, D’tigers as they prepared to take off for Bamako, Mali for the 2019 FIBA Africa World Cup qualification.

=== Nigeria Women’s Basketball Team (D’Tigress) ===
In 2018 ahead of the FIBA Women Worldcup, AFA Sports was confirmed as the official apparel sponsor of the Nigeria's Women Basketball team. This partnership made the organization the first African sports apparel manufacturer to feature in a major international tournament. On the 4th of August 2019, AFA unveiled a new jersey for the team. The notable change in the Jersey is the infusion of the Contemporary African Tribal print which is visible in the neck and tight region of the Jersey.

=== Nigeria Volleyball Federation ===
In 2017, AFA partnered with the Nigeria Volley Federation as the official jersey sponsor of the Female Volleyball team.

=== The Defenders ===
On March 6, 2019, it was officially announced that AFA Sports will be the Kit sponsor of the Defenders Basketball Team ahead of the African Basketball League tournament.

=== CBL Sponsorship ===
AFA Sports was the headline sponsor of the Continental Basketball League (CBL). As the headline sponsor, they kitted out all the five teams that competed in the tournament. The teams were Abidjan Raiders, Eko Kings, Lagos City Stars, Lagos Warriors, Yudunde Giants and Libreville Izobe Dragons.

=== Brand Ambassador ===
AFA Sports on 27 August 2019 announced Nigeria's point guard Ezinne Kalu as their brand ambassador. This came after the Nigeria Women's Basketball Team, won the FIBA 2019 Afro Basket Tournament for the 2nd time in a row and Ezinne was named the most valuable player of the tournament.

== Products ==
=== AFA CTG 1 ===
The CTG 1 is AFA's first sneaker. It is a basketball sneaker and is made of Contour Traction Grip technology. Its most notable feature is the Map of Africa embossed on the sole. The CTG1 was launched in 2017 and was first featured by the Nigerian's Women's basketball team at the 2017 Women Afro Basket Competition.

=== AFA L-IV ===
AFA sports named this tracksuit the L-IV as a representation of the concept of the 54 African countries. The tracksuit has the flag of the fifty-four African countries printed on it.

AFA has a range of other products such as basketballs, headbands, lifestyle sneakers, polo and hoodies.
