= Batouly Camara =

American-Guinean basketball player

Personal information
- Born: November 2, 1996 (age 30) New York City
- Listed height: 6 ft 2 in (1.88 m)

Career information
- High school: Blair Academy (Blairstown, New Jersey)
- College: Kentucky (2015–2017); UConn (2017–2020)
- Position: Forward

Career history
- 2020–2021: Bembibre

Batouly Camara (born November 2, 1996) is a Guinean-American basketball player. She played college basketball for Kentucky and UConn and later professionally in Liga Femenina de Baloncesto. As a member of the Guinea national team, she participated in the 2021 FIBA Women's Afrobasket.

== High School ==
Camara was a student of Blair Academy. She averaged 12.5 points and 12.0 rebounds per game. Coming out of high school she was rated the ninth-best player in the country by ESPN.com. She was also active off the court as she was elected vice chair of Blair Academy's student government council as a junior and was a representative on the student council as a sophomore.

== College ==
As a freshman at University of Kentucky, Camara appeared in 33 games with 14 starts, averaged 5.1 points and 4.3 rebounds per game. She got transferred to the University of Connecticut in her sophomore year and appeared in 23 games, averaging 4.8 minutes per game. As a junior she played in 25 games, averaged 1.2 points and 1.6 rebounds per game. In her senior year she appeared in 10 games, averaged 0.8 points and 0.3 rebounds per game.

== Professional career ==
Camara played for Embutidos Pajariel Bembibre PDM in the Spanish Liga Femenina de Baloncesto for the 2020–21 season.

== National Team career ==
Camara has been a member of the Guinea women's national basketball team and in 2021 participated in the FIBA Women's Afrobasket.

== Personal life ==
As of 2022, Camara is a college counselor and girls' basketball coach in Blair Academy. Camara is the founder of Women and Kids Academy (W.A.K.E) and also made it to Forbes list of 30 Under 30 - Sports (2021).
