= Fatima Sacko =

Guinean basketball player (born 1998)

Fatima Elisabeth Sacko (born 19 April 1998) is a Guinean basketball player. She played for Guinea women's national basketball team in 2017 Women's Afrobasket and 2023 Women's Afrobasket.
