= Aicha Mara =

Guinean basketball player (born 1996)

Personal information
- Born: 24 January 1996 (age 30) Evreux, France
- Listed height: 5 ft 11 in (1.80 m)

Career information
- WNBA draft: 2018: undrafted
- Playing career: 2018–present
- Position: Guard

Career history
- 2018-2019: Pays Voironnais
- 2020-2021: Monaco

Aicha Mara (born 24 January 1996) is a French-Guinean basketball player who plays as a guard for Guinea women's national basketball team and the Monaco team in the French basketball league.

== Career history ==
Mara played for Pays Voironnais basket club during the 2018–2019 season where she helped the team finish the season second in the league before being transferred to Monaco for the 2020–2021 season. She have fronted 95 opponents in her basketball career.

== Guinea national team ==
Mara first represented Guinea in 2017 when she was called up for 2017 Women's Afrobasket. She was also part of the Guinea women's national basketball squad that played in the 2021 and 2023 Women's Afrobasket. She ended the 2021 women's Afrobasket with 11 points per game, 3.3 rebounds per game, 1 assist per game, 2.7 steals per game and ended the 2023 women's Afrobasket with 5.7 points per game, 3.8 rebounds per game, 2.3 assist per game and 1.5 steals per game.
