= Aicha Sidibe =

Senegalese basketball player (1995-)

No. 84 – Ville de Dakar
- Position: Center
- League: SDI

Personal information
- Born: 3 December 1995 (age 30)
- Listed height: 6 ft 1 in (1.85 m)

Career information
- WNBA draft: 2017: undrafted
Medals
Women's basketball
Representing Senegal
AfroBasket
| Silver medal – second place | 2017 Mali |

Aicha Sidibe (born 3 December 1995) is a Senegalese center basketball player for the Senegalese national team.

She participated at the 2017 Women's Afrobasket.
