= 2017 FIBA Women's AfroBasket =

23rd FIBA Women's African Basketball Championship

Tournament details
- Host country: Mali
- City: Bamako
- Dates: 18–27 August
- Teams: 12 (from 1 confederation)
- Venue: 1 (in 1 host city)

Final positions
- Champions: Nigeria (3rd title)
- Runners-up: Senegal
- Third place: Mali

Tournament statistics
- MVP: (Senegal) Astou Traoré
- Top scorer: (Senegal) As. Traoré (21.6)
- Top rebounds: (Mali) N. Coulibaly (9.6)
- Top assists: (Mozambique) Cossa (5.0)
- PPG (Team): Nigeria (80.6)
- RPG (Team): Mali (54.3)
- APG (Team): Senegal (19.8)

Official website
- www.fiba.basketball/history

The 2017 FIBA Women's AfroBasket was the 23rd AfroBasket Women, played under the rules of FIBA, the world governing body for basketball, and FIBA Africa. The tournament was hosted by Mali from 18 to 27 August 2017, with games played in Bamako. The winners and runners-up qualified for the 2018 FIBA Women's Basketball World Cup.

Nigeria won their third title after defeating Senegal 65–48 in the final.

== Venue ==
Bamako	2017 FIBA Women's AfroBasket is located in Mali
Palais des Sports Salamatou Maïga	2017 FIBA Women's AfroBasket is located in Mali
Capacity: 5,000	2017 FIBA Women's AfroBasket is located in Mali

== Qualification ==
Event	Date	Location	Vacancies	Qualified
Host nation			1	Mali
2015 Women's AfroBasket semi-finalists	24 September – 3 October 2015	(Cameroon) Yaoundé	4	Senegal; Cameroon; Nigeria; Angola
2017 Women's AfroBasket Qualification Zone 1			1	Tunisia
2017 Women's AfroBasket Qualification Zone 2			1	Guinea
2017 Women's AfroBasket Qualification Zone 3	12–13 May 2017	(Ivory Coast) Abidjan	1	Ivory Coast
2017 Women's AfroBasket Qualification Zone 4	17–18 June 2017	(Democratic Republic of the Congo) Kinshasa	1	DR Congo
2017 Women's AfroBasket Qualification Zone 5	12–18 March 2017	(Egypt) Cairo	1	Egypt
2017 Women's AfroBasket Qualification Zone 6	9–10 March 2017	(Mozambique) Maputo	1	Mozambique
2017 Women's AfroBasket Qualification Wildcard	19 July 2017	(Ivory Coast) Abidjan	1	Central African Republic
Total			12	

== Preliminary round ==
The draw of the 2017 FIBA Women's AfroBasket took place on 27 May 2017 in Bamako, Mali.

All times are local (UTC±0).

=== Group A ===
Pos	Team	Pld	W	L	PF	PA	PD	Pts	Qualification
1	Angola	5	5	0	374	290	+84	10	Quarterfinals
2	Mali (H)	5	4	1	372	228	+144	9	Quarterfinals
3	Cameroon	5	2	3	303	295	+8	7 (Note: Cameroon 3 Pts, +12 PD; Ivory Coast 3 Pts, −2 PD; Tunisia 3 Pts, −10 PD)	Quarterfinals
4	Ivory Coast	5	2	3	326	311	+15	7	Quarterfinals
5	Tunisia	5	2	3	317	327	−10	7	9th–12th place semifinals
6	Central African Republic	5	0	5	246	487	−241	5	9th–12th place semifinals

Source: FIBA
Rules for classification: 1) Points; 2) Head-to-head results; 3) Points difference; 4) Points scored.
(H) Hosts
Notes:

18 August 2017
13:00

Boxscore

Ivory Coast	104–57	Central African Republic
Scoring by quarter: 34–10, 22–12, 21–19, 27–16
Pts: Koné 18; Rebs: Fofana, Kouyaté 8 Asts: Koné 8		Pts: Imbangueret 22; Rebs: Imbangueret 12; Asts: three players 1

Palais des Sports Salamatou Maïga, Bamako
Referees: Arbia Belghith (TUN), Sara El-Sharnouby (EGY), Mbayi Ntela (COD)

18 August 2017
15:15

Boxscore

Angola	78–56	Cameroon
Scoring by quarter: 24–15, 12–15, 14–11, 28–15
Pts: Lucas 28; Rebs: Lucas 6 Asts: Jorge 3		Pts: Weledji 10; Rebs: Ramey 9 Asts: Lonlack 4

Palais des Sports Salamatou Maïga, Bamako
Referees: Chahinaz Boussetta (MAR), Ndeye Diagne (SEN), Wojciech Liszka (POL)

18 August 2017
19:00

Boxscore

Mali	86–48	Tunisia
Scoring by quarter: 21–17, 20–12, 24–10, 21–9
Pts: N. Coulibaly 17; Rebs: K. Coulibaly 11; Asts: four players 3		Pts: Hamrouni 12; Rebs: Khlifa, Mnasria 4 Asts: Ben Ameur 4

Palais des Sports Salamatou Maïga, Bamako
Referees: Olusegun Adekanmbi (NGR), Natalia Cuello (DOM), Nadjet Zenagui (ALG)

19 August 2017
09:30

Boxscore

Central African Republic	51–96	Tunisia
Scoring by quarter: 6–23, 13–20, 13–34, 19–19
Pts: Imbangueret 30; Rebs: Imbangueret 8 Asts: four players 2		Pts: Hamrouni 19; Rebs: Hamrouni 10; Asts: three players 4

Palais des Sports Salamatou Maïga, Bamako

19 August 2017
14:00

Boxscore

Cameroon	54–57	Ivory Coast
Scoring by quarter: 14–11, 13–12, 9–21, 18–13
Pts: Ade 15; Rebs: Ade 8 Asts: Mbiandja 4		Pts: Diawara 18; Rebs: Diaby 9 Asts: Cissé 4

Palais des Sports Salamatou Maïga, Bamako

19 August 2017
18:30

Boxscore

Mali	59–68	Angola
Scoring by quarter: 20–11, 2–13, 22–21, 15–23
Pts: Tirera 21; Rebs: N. Coulibaly 15; Asts: Traoré 4		Pts: Lucas 21; Rebs: Gala 8 Asts: Gala 3

Palais des Sports Salamatou Maïga, Bamako

20 August 2017
14:00

Boxscore

Angola	62–55	Tunisia
Scoring by quarter: 18–13, 15–12, 15–17, 14–13
Pts: Lucas 15; Rebs: Tomás 10; Asts: three players 2		Pts: Hamrouni 14; Rebs: Mnasria 9 Asts: Khlifa 5

Palais des Sports Salamatou Maïga, Bamako

20 August 2017
18:30

Boxscore

Ivory Coast	39–61	Mali
Scoring by quarter: 13–17, 6–16, 12–9, 8–19
Pts: Diaby, Kouyaté 10; Rebs: four players 4 Asts: Cissé 3		Pts: Gandega, N. Coulibaly 12; Rebs: N. Coulibaly 13; Asts: Camara, Traoré 4

Palais des Sports Salamatou Maïga, Bamako

20 August 2017
20:45

Boxscore

Cameroon	94–42	Central African Republic
Scoring by quarter: 15–10, 21–10, 28–6, 30–16
Pts: Assena, Lonlack 15; Rebs: Ade 9 Asts: Mbiandja 6		Pts: Imbangueret 25; Rebs: Imbangueret 12; Asts: three players 1

Palais des Sports Salamatou Maïga, Bamako

22 August 2017
16:15

Boxscore

Tunisia	49–64	Cameroon
Scoring by quarter: 13–12, 14–12, 13–16, 9–24
Pts: Ben Mechlia, Loubiri 10; Rebs: Hamrouni, Mnasria 7 Asts: Ben Mechlia 5		Pts: Weledji 22; Rebs: Lonlack, Weledji 7 Asts: Mbiandja 3

Palais des Sports Salamatou Maïga, Bamako

22 August 2017
18:30

Boxscore

Central African Republic	38–97	Mali
Scoring by quarter: 8–31, 16–20, 7–32, 7–14
Pts: Yagba 13; Rebs: Guegbelet 9 Asts: Gaombalet, Guegbelet 2		Pts: Diakité 15; Rebs: Dabo 8 Asts: Gandega 7

Palais des Sports Salamatou Maïga, Bamako

22 August 2017
20:45

Boxscore

Ivory Coast	62–70	Angola
Scoring by quarter: 18–10, 13–16, 19–24, 12–20
Pts: Kouyaté 19; Rebs: Kouyaté 9 Asts: Koné 4		Pts: Lucas 27; Rebs: Lucas 8 Asts: Lucas 5

Palais des Sports Salamatou Maïga, Bamako

23 August 2017
14:00

Boxscore

Central African Republic	58–96	Angola
Scoring by quarter: 13–15, 15–29, 13–30, 17–20
Pts: Imbangueret 25; Rebs: Guegbelet 12; Asts: Gaombalet 4		Pts: Mpaka 16; Rebs: Ndoniema 8 Asts: Eusébio 5

Palais des Sports Salamatou Maïga, Bamako

23 August 2017
16:15

Boxscore

Tunisia	69–64	Ivory Coast
Scoring by quarter: 17–10, 10–14, 9–11, 14–15
Pts: Ben Mechlia, Mnasria 15; Rebs: Mnasria 11; Asts: Ben Mechlia 5		Pts: Kouyaté 26; Rebs: Kouyaté 14; Asts: Kouyaté 5

Palais des Sports Salamatou Maïga, Bamako

23 August 2017
18:30

Boxscore

Mali	69–35	Cameroon
Scoring by quarter: 19–7, 19–14, 13–6, 18–8
Pts: M. Coulibaly 19; Rebs: K. Coulibaly 11; Asts: Diakité 3		Pts: Lonlack 10; Rebs: Ade 6 Asts: Lonlack, Tchasi 2

Palais des Sports Salamatou Maïga, Bamako

=== Group B ===
Pos	Team	Pld	W	L	PF	PA	PD	Pts	Qualification
1	Nigeria	5	5	0	434	275	+159	10	Quarterfinals
2	Senegal	5	4	1	398	288	+110	9	Quarterfinals
3	Egypt	5	3	2	432	419	+13	8	Quarterfinals
4	Mozambique	5	2	3	346	336	+10	7	Quarterfinals
5	DR Congo	5	1	4	308	342	−34	6	9th–12th place semifinals
6	Guinea	5	0	5	234	492	−258	5	9th–12th place semifinals

Source: FIBA
Rules for classification: 1) Points; 2) Head-to-head results; 3) Points difference; 4) Points scored.

18 August 2017
10:30

Boxscore

Senegal	105–39	Guinea
Scoring by quarter: 27–5, 26–12, 28–5, 24–14
Pts: Ay. Traoré 26; Rebs: Daou, Sidibe 7 Asts: Diouf 8		Pts: Mbaye 9 Rebs: three players 3 Asts: Sacko 3

Palais des Sports Salamatou Maïga, Bamako
Referees: Aboulaye Kamagate (CIV), Clesio Ramos (ANG), Christine Vuong (CAN)

18 August 2017
10:45

Boxscore

DR Congo	72–99	Egypt
Scoring by quarter: 17–19, 10–26, 20–22, 25–32
Pts: Bilonda, Muganza 12; Rebs: Muganza 12; Asts: Mambengya 4		Pts: Deghady 33; Rebs: Helwa 13; Asts: El-Shaarawy 4

Palais des Sports Salamatou Maïga, Bamako
Referees: Renato Balezou (CAF), Sassi Camara (MLI), Ingrid Nzame (GAB)

18 August 2017
21:15

Boxscore

Mozambique	69–80	Nigeria
Scoring by quarter: 19–21, 13–20, 16–18, 21–21
Pts: Dongue 19; Rebs: Muianga 6 Asts: Cossa 6		Pts: Elonu 17; Rebs: Mohammed 7 Asts: Elonu 7

Palais des Sports Salamatou Maïga, Bamako
Referees: Aboulaye Kamagate (CIV), Laurie Meboung (CMR), Christine Vuong (CAN)

19 August 2017
11:45

Boxscore

Egypt	109–78	Guinea
Scoring by quarter: 21–11, 31–23, 24–19, 33–25
Pts: Awad 20; Rebs: Abdelalim 10; Asts: Deghady 6		Pts: Peruch 20; Rebs: Keita 14; Asts: Peruch 6

Palais des Sports Salamatou Maïga, Bamako

19 August 2017
16:15

Boxscore

Nigeria	84–47	DR Congo
Scoring by quarter: 23–8, 18–22, 11–8, 32–9
Pts: Nyingifa 13; Rebs: Akhator 9 Asts: Elonu 4		Pts: Mokango 10; Rebs: Mokango 8 Asts: Bilonda 2

Palais des Sports Salamatou Maïga, Bamako

19 August 2017
20:45

Boxscore

Senegal	76–67	Mozambique
Scoring by quarter: 21–7, 27–18, 9–21, 19–21
Pts: As. Traoré 29; Rebs: As. Traoré, Sy 6 Asts: Sarr 5		Pts: Cossa 16; Rebs: Dongue 11; Asts: Cossa, Dongue 2

Palais des Sports Salamatou Maïga, Bamako

20 August 2017
09:30

Boxscore

Nigeria	106–72	Egypt
Scoring by quarter: 20–15, 30–14, 29–20, 27–23
Pts: Akhator 24; Rebs: Akhator 13; Asts: Elonu 8		Pts: Deghady 15; Rebs: El-Shaarawy 7 Asts: Abdelgawad 7

Palais des Sports Salamatou Maïga, Bamako

20 August 2017
11:45

Boxscore

Mozambique	88–47	Guinea
Scoring by quarter: 22–5, 17–3, 29–24, 20–15
Pts: Dongue 18; Rebs: Seda 12; Asts: Cossa 5		Pts: Mara 18; Rebs: Keita 8 Asts: four players 2

Palais des Sports Salamatou Maïga, Bamako

20 August 2017
16:15

Boxscore

DR Congo	63–70	Senegal
Scoring by quarter: 24–20, 13–20, 13–18, 13–12
Pts: three players 12; Rebs: Muganza 8 Asts: Mambengya 10		Pts: As. Traoré 19; Rebs: As. Traoré 8 Asts: Thiam 7

Palais des Sports Salamatou Maïga, Bamako

22 August 2017
09:30

Boxscore

Egypt	61–93	Senegal
Scoring by quarter: 10–21, 12–22, 26–25, 13–25
Pts: Awad 13; Rebs: Helwa 6 Asts: El-Shaarawy, Helwa 3		Pts: As. Traoré 26; Rebs: Daou 12; Asts: Mame-Marie Sy 8

Palais des Sports Salamatou Maïga, Bamako

22 August 2017
11:45

Boxscore

Guinea	33–106	Nigeria
Scoring by quarter: 8–26, 4–22, 8–34, 13–24
Pts: Mara 11; Rebs: Keita, Soumah 3 Asts: Peruch 3		Pts: Akhator 24; Rebs: Akhator, Madu 7 Asts: Madu 5

Palais des Sports Salamatou Maïga, Bamako

22 August 2017
14:00

Boxscore

DR Congo	42–52	Mozambique
Scoring by quarter: 7–16, 15–11, 9–13, 11–12
Pts: Mukoso 13; Rebs: Mokango, Ngoyisa 6 Asts: Bombolo 6		Pts: Dongue 14; Rebs: Dongue 11; Asts: Cossa 8

Palais des Sports Salamatou Maïga, Bamako

23 August 2017
09:30

Boxscore

Guinea	37–84	DR Congo
Scoring by quarter: 13–19, 3–20, 11–23, 10–22
Pts: Soumah 10; Rebs: Keita 7 Asts: Mara 2		Pts: Mokango 22; Rebs: Kapinga, Mfutila 8 Asts: Mambengya 7

Palais des Sports Salamatou Maïga, Bamako

23 August 2017
11:45

Boxscore

Egypt	91–70	Mozambique
Scoring by quarter: 32–19, 12–19, 19–10, 28–22
Pts: Deghady, Osama 16; Rebs: El-Shaarawy 9 Asts: three players 3		Pts: Dongue 13; Rebs: Mafanela, Seda 8 Asts: Mucubaquine 4

Palais des Sports Salamatou Maïga, Bamako

23 August 2017
20:45

Boxscore

Senegal	54–58	Nigeria
Scoring by quarter: 13–14, 13–20, 15–14, 13–10
Pts: As. Traoré 13; Rebs: As. Traoré 8 Asts: five players 2		Pts: Akhator 15; Rebs: Akhator 13; Asts: Nyingifa 5

Palais des Sports Salamatou Maïga, Bamako

== Knockout stage ==
=== Bracket ===
Quarterfinals
25 August
Angola	47
Mozambique	61
25 August
Senegal	71
Cameroon	58
25 August
Mali	90
Egypt	50
25 August
Nigeria	98
Ivory Coast	43

Semifinals
26 August
Mozambique	52
Senegal	72
26 August
Mali	47
Nigeria	48

Final
27 August
Nigeria	65
Senegal	48
Third place game
27 August
Mozambique	52
Mali	75

5th place bracket

5th–8th place semifinals
26 August
Angola	66
Cameroon	54
26 August
Egypt	70
Ivory Coast	73

Fifth place game
27 August
Angola	56
Ivory Coast	61
Seventh place game
27 August
Cameroon	83
Egypt	86

9th place bracket

9th–12th place semifinals
25 August
Tunisia	56
Guinea	60
25 August
DR Congo	101
Central African Republic	40

Ninth place game
26 August
Guinea	38
DR Congo	69
Eleventh place game
26 August
Tunisia	73
Central African Republic	63

=== Quarterfinals ===
25 August 2017
14:00

Boxscore

Ivory Coast	43–98	Nigeria
Scoring by quarter: 13–23, 2–23, 17–25, 11–27
Pts: Bognini 11; Rebs: Kouyaté 9 Asts: Djedjemel, Kouyaté 3		Pts: Akhator 21; Rebs: Akhator 11; Asts: Kalu 8

Palais des Sports Salamatou Maïga, Bamako
Attendance: 400

25 August 2017
16:15

Boxscore

Mozambique	61–47	Angola
Scoring by quarter: 6–16, 17–4, 22–14, 16–13
Pts: Dongue 27; Rebs: Seda 15; Asts: Cossa 10		Pts: Lucas 18; Rebs: Lucas, Miguel 7 Asts: Jorge 2

Palais des Sports Salamatou Maïga, Bamako

25 August 2017
18:30

Boxscore

Egypt	50–90	Mali
Scoring by quarter: 15–19, 12–20, 8–26, 15–25
Pts: Abdelgawad 15; Rebs: Helwa 9 Asts: Helwa 4		Pts: N. Coulibaly 16; Rebs: K. Coulibaly, N. Coulibaly 12; Asts: Camara 7

Palais des Sports Salamatou Maïga, Bamako

25 August 2017
20:45

Boxscore

Cameroon	58–71	Senegal
Scoring by quarter: 11–13, 9–19, 17–23, 21–16
Pts: Lonlack 21; Rebs: Lonlack 9 Asts: Weledji 6		Pts: As. Traoré 21; Rebs: three players 5 Asts: three players 5

Palais des Sports Salamatou Maïga, Bamako

=== 9th–12th place semifinals ===
25 August 2017
09:30

Boxscore

Guinea	60–56	Tunisia
Scoring by quarter: 15–8, 16–19, 13–13, 16–16
Pts: Sylla 18; Rebs: Keita 12; Asts: Mbaye 4		Pts: Loubiri 14; Rebs: three players 5 Asts: Ben Mechlia 5

Palais des Sports Salamatou Maïga, Bamako

25 August 2017
11:45

Boxscore

Central African Republic	40–101	DR Congo
Scoring by quarter: 11–23, 10–31, 8–15, 11–32
Pts: Imbangueret 13; Rebs: Yagba 5 Asts: Gaombalet 3		Pts: Mfutila 25; Rebs: Kabobo 10; Asts: Mambengya 6

Palais des Sports Salamatou Maïga, Bamako

=== 5th–8th place semifinals ===
26 August 2017
14:00

Boxscore

Angola	66–54	Cameroon
Scoring by quarter: 10–6, 27–15, 7–18, 22–15
Pts: Tomás 16; Rebs: Filipe 8 Asts: Lucas 4		Pts: Lonlack 18; Rebs: Ade 6 Asts: Weledji 5

Palais des Sports Salamatou Maïga, Bamako

26 August 2017
16:15

Boxscore

Ivory Coast	73–70	Egypt
Scoring by quarter: 13–6, 18–6, 22–2, 20-2
Pts: Ciesse 19; Rebs: Diawara 9 Asts: Kouyaté 8		Pts: El-Shaarawy 19; Rebs: Helwa 9 Asts: Helwa 6

Palais des Sports Salamatou Maïga, Bamako

=== Semifinals ===
26 August 2017
18:30

Boxscore

Nigeria	48–47	Mali
Scoring by quarter: 10–7, 13–5, 16-17, 9-18
Pts: Nyingifa 11; Rebs: Akhator 10; Asts: Kalu 6		Pts: Tirera 15; Rebs: N. Coulibaly 17; Asts: Tirera 6

Palais des Sports Salamatou Maïga, Bamako

26 August 2017
20:45

Boxscore

Mozambique	52–72	Senegal
Scoring by quarter: 19–20, 11–24, 10–12, 12–16
Pts: Dongue 20; Rebs: Seda 14; Asts: Cossa 3		Pts: As. Traoré 22; Rebs: Sidibe 8 Asts: Ay. Traoré 4

Palais des Sports Salamatou Maïga, Bamako

=== Eleventh place game ===
26 August 2017
09:30

Boxscore

Tunisia	73–63	Central African Republic
Scoring by quarter: 18–11, 20–10, 17–20, 18–22
Pts: Hamrouni 14; Rebs: Ben Mahmoud 12; Asts: Loubiri 5		Pts: Imbangueret 23; Rebs: Guegbelet 14; Asts: Eyene 7

Palais des Sports Salamatou Maïga, Bamako

=== Ninth place game ===
26 August 2017
11:45

Boxscore

Guinea	38–69	DR Congo
Scoring by quarter: 7–14, 8–19, 12–19, 11−18
Pts: Mara 14; Rebs: Bah 6 Asts: Mara, Mbaye 2		Pts: Ngoyisa 13; Rebs: Ngoyisa 12; Asts: Bombolo 8

Palais des Sports Salamatou Maïga, Bamako

=== Seventh place game ===
27 August 2017
11:00

Boxscore

Cameroon	83–86	Egypt
Scoring by quarter: 11–28, 28–17, 16–20, 28–21
Pts: Lonlack 22; Rebs: Ebogo 16; Asts: Lonlack 8		Pts: Abdelgawad, El-Shaarawy 16; Rebs: Helwa 10; Asts: Deghady 5

Palais des Sports Salamatou Maïga, Bamako

=== Fifth place game ===
27 August 2017
13:15

Boxscore

Angola	56–61	Ivory Coast
Scoring by quarter: 8–18, 13–14, 18–13, 17–16
Pts: Filipe 13; Rebs: Filipe 10; Asts: Gala 3		Pts: Kouyaté 15; Rebs: Diaby 11; Asts: Kouyaté 4

Palais des Sports Salamatou Maïga, Bamako

=== Third place game ===
27 August 2017
15:30

Boxscore

Mozambique	52–75	Mali
Scoring by quarter: 12–21, 20–13, 12–21, 8–20
Pts: Dongue 10; Rebs: Seda 7 Asts: Cossa 5		Pts: Traoré 19; Rebs: three players 8 Asts: Tirera 4

Palais des Sports Salamatou Maïga, Bamako

=== Final ===
27 August 2017
18:00

Boxscore

Nigeria	65–48	Senegal
Scoring by quarter: 12–18, 21–10, 15–7, 17–13
Pts: Akhator 13; Rebs: Akhator, Mohammed 7 Asts: Elonu 4		Pts: As. Traoré 17; Rebs: As. Traoré 6 Asts: Diouf 4

Palais des Sports Salamatou Maïga, Bamako
Attendance: 4,500

== Final standings ==
Qualified for 2018 FIBA Women's Basketball World Cup

Rank	Team	Record
1st place, gold medalist(s)	Nigeria	8–0
2nd place, silver medalist(s)	Senegal	6–2
3rd place, bronze medalist(s)	Mali	6–2
4	Mozambique	3–5
5	Ivory Coast	4–4
6	Angola	6–2
7	Egypt	4–4
8	Cameroon	2–7
9	DR Congo	3–4
10	Guinea	1–6
11	Tunisia	3–4
12	Central African Republic	0–7

== Statistics and awards ==
=== Statistical leaders ===
Points

Name	PPG
(Senegal) Astou Traoré	21.6
(Central African Republic) Abety Imbangueret	21.6
(Mozambique) Leia Dongue	16.9
(Angola) Italee Lucas	15.4
(Nigeria) Evelyn Akhator	15.3

Rebounds

Name	RPG
(Mali) Naîgnouma Coulibaly	9.6
(Nigeria) Evelyn Akhator	9.5
(Central African Republic) Abety Imbangueret	9.1
(Central African Republic) Gabriella Guegbelet	8.7
(Mozambique) Tamara Seda	8.6

Assists

Name	APG
(Mozambique) Anabela Cossa	5.0
(Democratic Republic of the Congo) Natacha Mambengya	4.4
(Democratic Republic of the Congo) Naura Bombolo	4.0
(Nigeria) Adaora Elonu	3.9
(Tunisia) Monia Ben Mechlia	3.7

Blocks

Name	BPG
(Democratic Republic of the Congo) Chanel Mokango	1.7
(Senegal) Mame-Marie Sy	1.3
(Angola) Luísa Tomás	1.3
(Mali) Astan Dabo	1.1
(Guinea) Aicha Dallo	1.1
(Tunisia) Salma Mnasria

Steals

Name	SPG
(Cameroon) Ramses Lonlack	3.0
(Nigeria) Ezinne Kalu	2.4
(Mali) Touty Gandega	2.3
(Senegal) Astou Traoré	2.3
(Nigeria) Adaora Elonu	2.1
(Ivory Coast) Kani Kouyaté	2.1

=== Awards ===
2017 Women's AfroBasket champions

Nigeria
Third title

- Most Valuable Player: (Senegal) Astou Traoré
- All-Star Team:
  - PG – (Nigeria) Evelyn Akhator
  - SG – (Angola) Italee Lucas
  - SF – (Mozambique) Leia Dongue
  - PF – (Senegal) Astou Traoré
  - C – (Mali) Naîgnouma Coulibaly
