= 2017 FIBA Women's AfroBasket qualification =

The 2017 FIBA Women's AfroBasket qualification occurred on various dates in 2017. It determined which African national basketball teams would qualify for the 2017 FIBA Women's AfroBasket. Teams competed with other teams in their respective zones for a spot in the Championship tournament.

== Qualified Teams ==
Five teams qualified for the tournament before the qualification round took place. Seven more teams claimed spots in the tournament through Zonal Qualifying.

Event	Date	Location	Vacancies	Qualified
Host Nation			1	Mali
2015 Women's AfroBasket semi-finalists	24 September – 3 October 2015	(Cameroon) Yaoundé	4	Senegal; Cameroon; Nigeria; Angola
2017 Women's AfroBasket Qualification Zone 1			1	Tunisia
2017 Women's AfroBasket Qualification Zone 2			1	Guinea
2017 Women's AfroBasket Qualification Zone 3	12–13 May 2017	(Ivory Coast) Abidjan	1	Ivory Coast
2017 Women's AfroBasket Qualification Zone 4	17–18 June 2017	(Democratic Republic of the Congo) Kinshasa	1	DR Congo
2017 Women's AfroBasket Qualification Zone 5	12–18 March 2017	(Egypt) Cairo	1	Egypt
2017 Women's AfroBasket Qualification Zone 6	9–10 March 2017	(Mozambique) Maputo	1	Mozambique
2017 Women's AfroBasket Qualification Wildcard	19 July 2017		1	Central African Republic
Total			12	

== Zones ==
=== Zone 1 ===
- Tunisia: Tunisia and Morocco were supposed to compete for the only ticket on offer for FIBA Africa Zone 1 teams for the Final Round that was scheduled to be played April 7-9 in Tunisia. However Morocco pulled out of the regional qualifier.

=== Zone 2 ===
- Guinea: Guinea and Cape Verde were supposed to compete for the only ticket on offer for FIBA Africa Zone 2 teams for the Final Round. However Cape Verde pulled out the regional qualifier.

=== Zone 3 ===
A regional tournament was held from 12 to 13 May 2017 in Abidjan, Ivory Coast.

12 May 2017

Ivory Coast	83–45	Benin

Abidjan, Ivory Coast

13 May 2017

Benin	45–70	Ivory Coast

Abidjan, Ivory Coast

=== Zone 4 ===
A regional tournament was held from 17 to 18 June 2017 in Kinshasa, DR Congo.

17 June 2017

DR Congo	67–53	Central African Republic
Scoring by quarter: 18-14, 18-11, 19-12, 12-16

Kinshasa, DR Congo

18 June 2017

Central African Republic	52–50	DR Congo
Scoring by quarter: 14-12, 11-19, 12-9, 15-10

Kinshasa, DR Congo

=== Zone 5 ===
Pos	Team	Pld	W	L	PF	PA	PD	Pts	Qualification
1	Egypt (H)	4	4	0	345	262	+83	8	Qualified for the 2017 FIBA Women's AfroBasket
2	Kenya	4	1	3	267	271	−4	5	
3	Uganda	4	1	3	227	306	−79	5	

Source: www.fiba.com at the Wayback Machine
(H) Hosts

March 12

Egypt	85–56	Uganda

Cairo, Egypt

March 13

Uganda	41–70	Kenya

Cairo, Egypt

March 14

Kenya	62–87	Egypt

Cairo, Egypt

March 16

Kenya	59–62	Uganda

Cairo, Egypt

March 17

Egypt	81–76	Kenya

Cairo, Egypt

March 18

Uganda	68–92	Egypt

Cairo, Egypt

=== Zone 6 ===
March 9

Mozambique	88–30	Zimbabwe

Maputo, Mozambique

March 10

Zimbabwe	40–90	Mozambique

Maputo, Mozambique

=== Wildcard ===
On 19 July 2017, FIBA Africa awarded the wild card for 2017 FIBA Women's AfroBasket to the Central African Republic.
