= Kouta Camara =

Malian basketball player (born 1995)

No. 24 – ASA Sceaux
- Position: Small forward
- League: LFB

Personal information
- Born: June 8, 1995 (age 31)
- Listed height: 1.76 m (5 ft 9 in)

Career information
- WNBA draft: 2017: undrafted
Medals
Women's basketball
Representing Mali
AfroBasket
Bronze medal – third place	2017 Mali
Bronze medal – third place	2019 Senegal

Kouta Camara (born June 8, 1995) is a Malian basketball player for ASA Sceaux and the Malian national team.

She participated at the 2017 Women's Afrobasket.
