= 2018 FIBA Women's Basketball World Cup =

Copa Mundial de Baloncesto Femenino FIBA 2018

Tournament details
- Host country: Spain
- City: Tenerife
- Dates: 22–30 September
- Teams: 16 (from 4 confederations)
- Venues: 2 (in 1 host city)

Final positions
- Champions: United States (10th title)
- Runners-up: Australia
- Third place: Spain
- Fourth place: Belgium

Tournament statistics
- MVP: (United States) Breanna Stewart
- Top scorer: (Australia) Liz Cambage (23.8 points per game)

Official website
- www.fiba.basketball

The 2018 FIBA Women's Basketball World Cup, the 18th edition of the FIBA Women's World Championship, was held in Tenerife, Canary Islands, Spain from 22 to 30 September 2018. This was the first edition to use the name of FIBA Women's Basketball World Cup. After the last edition in 2014, FIBA changed the name of the competition from the FIBA World Championship for Women, in order to align its name with that of the corresponding men's competition.

The United States were the two-time defending champions. This tournament saw the World Cup debut of Belgium, Latvia and Puerto Rico.

The US Team won the final against Australia, to win their third straight and tenth overall title.

== Venues ==
San Cristóbal de La Laguna	Santa Cruz de Tenerife	2018 FIBA Women's Basketball World Cup is located in Canary Islands
Tenerife Sports Pavilion Santiago Martín	Palacio Municipal de Deportes	2018 FIBA Women's Basketball World Cup is located in Canary Islands
Group Phase, Qualification for Quarter-Finals, Final Phase	Group Phase, Qualification for Quarter-Finals	2018 FIBA Women's Basketball World Cup is located in Canary Islands
Capacity: 5,100	Capacity: 3,600	2018 FIBA Women's Basketball World Cup is located in Canary Islands

== Hosts selection ==
The whole bidding process started in October 2014. Bids from two nations were submitted. On 31 October 2014, it was confirmed that Spain and Israel were the bidders. On 16 December 2014, it was announced that Spain won the bid and would host the upcoming World Cup.

2018 FIBA Women's Basketball World Cup bidding results
Nation	Votes
Spain	18
Israel	5

== Qualification ==
Spain as the hosts automatically qualified for the tournament in December 2014. The United States were the next to qualify after winning Gold at the 2016 Summer Olympics.

The remaining teams were decided over June, July & August 2017 through the Women’s Continental Cups. The continental qualifiers vary in the number of teams; the European qualifiers featured 16 teams, Africa featured 12 teams, Americas featured 10 teams and Asia featured 8 teams. From the 46 teams competing for the final 14 spots, the field was completed by the top five teams from 2017 EuroBasket Women, the top three teams from the 2017 FIBA Women's AmeriCup, the two finalists from the 2017 Women's Afrobasket; as well as the top four teams from the 2017 FIBA Asia Women's Cup, which saw teams from Asia and Oceania compete together for the first time ever.

Team	Qualification		Appearance			Best Performance	FIBA World Ranking	FIBA Zone Ranking
Team	Method	Date	Last	Total	Streak	Best Performance	FIBA World Ranking	FIBA Zone Ranking
Spain	Host nation	16 December 2014	2014	7	7	Runners-up (2014)	2	1
United States	2016 Summer Olympics	20 August 2016	2014	17	15	Champions (1953, 1957, 1979, 1986, 1990, 1998, 2002, 2010, 2014)	1	1
Belgium	EuroBasket Women	22 June 2017	—	1	1	Debut	28	14
France	EuroBasket Women	22 June 2017	2014	10	5	3rd Place (1953)	3	2
Greece	EuroBasket Women	22 June 2017	2010	2	1	11th Place (2010)	20	9
Latvia	EuroBasket Women	24 June 2017	—	1	1	Debut	26	12
Turkey	EuroBasket Women	24 June 2017	2014	2	2	4th Place (2014)	7	4
South Korea	Women's Asia Cup	27 July 2017	2014	18	18	Runners-up (1967, 1979)	16	4
Australia	Women's Asia Cup	27 July 2017	2014	15	14	Champions (2006)	4	1
China	Women's Asia Cup	27 July 2017	2014	10	10	Runners-up (1994)	10	1
Japan	Women's Asia Cup	27 July 2017	2014	13	3	Runners-up (1975)	13	2
Canada	Women's AmeriCup	12 August 2017	2014	11	4	3rd Place (1979, 1986)	5	2
Argentina	Women's AmeriCup	12 August 2017	2010	9	1	6th Place (1953)	15	5
Puerto Rico	Women's AmeriCup	13 August 2017	–	1	1	Debut	22	6
Nigeria	Women's Afrobasket	26 August 2017	2006	2	1	16th Place (2006)	34	5
Senegal	Women's Afrobasket	26 August 2017	2010	8	1	12th Place (1979)	17	1

== Format ==
The tournament was played in two phases. In the first phase, the 16 qualified teams were sorted into four groups of four (A-D), each team in a group played each other once, 24 games were played in the first phase. The top team from each group directly advanced to the quarterfinals. The teams that placed fourth in the group stage were eliminated. The teams placed second and third from each group advanced to the quarterfinal qualifications, where the winners of the qualification round then progressed to the quarterfinals, losers were eliminated.

In the second phase, a knockout stage was used to determine the champion. In the quarterfinals the four winners progressed to the semifinals, the four losers played in classification games for 5–8th. In total, 40 games were played over a total of 8 days.

== Draw ==
The official draw ceremony took place on 6 February 2018, at San Cristóbal de la Laguna, Island of Tenerife, Canary Islands, Spain.

=== Seedings ===
Included are the respective FIBA World Rankings for women:

Pot 1	Pot 2	Pot 3	Pot 4
United States (1); Australia (4); Spain (2); France (3)	Belgium (28); Greece (20); Turkey (7); Latvia (26)	Canada (5); Argentina (15); Japan (13); China (10)	Puerto Rico (22); South Korea (16); Nigeria (34); Senegal (17)

== Preliminary round ==
=== Group A ===
Pos	Team	Pld	W	L	PF	PA	PD	Pts	Qualification
1	Canada	3	3	0	234	173	+61	6	Quarterfinals
2	France	3	2	1	224	200	+24	5	Qualification round
3	Greece	3	1	2	179	204	−25	4	Qualification round
4	South Korea	3	0	3	169	229	−60	3	

Source: FIBA
Rules for classification: 1) Points; 2) Head-to-head results; 3) Points difference; 4) Points scored.

22 September 2018
South Korea	58–89	France
Greece	50–81	Canada
23 September 2018
Canada	82–63	South Korea
France	75–71	Greece
25 September 2018
South Korea	48–58	Greece
Canada	71–60	France

=== Group B ===
Pos	Team	Pld	W	L	PF	PA	PD	Pts	Qualification
1	Australia	3	3	0	260	175	+85	6	Quarterfinals
2	Nigeria	3	2	1	217	224	−7	5	Qualification round
3	Turkey	3	1	2	195	201	−6	4	Qualification round
4	Argentina	3	0	3	150	222	−72	3	

Source: FIBA
Rules for classification: 1) Points; 2) Head-to-head results; 3) Points difference; 4) Points scored.

22 September 2018
Australia	86–68	Nigeria
Turkey	63–37	Argentina
23 September 2018
Argentina	43–84	Australia
Nigeria	74–68	Turkey
25 September 2018
Australia	90–64	Turkey
Argentina	70–75	Nigeria

=== Group C ===
Pos	Team	Pld	W	L	PF	PA	PD	Pts	Qualification
1	Belgium	3	2	1	233	176	+57	5 (Note: Belgium 1–1, +7 PD; Spain 1–1, +4 PD; Japan 1–1, –11 PD)	Quarterfinals
2	Spain (H)	3	2	1	225	196	+29	5	Qualification round
3	Japan	3	2	1	217	220	−3	5	Qualification round
4	Puerto Rico	3	0	3	150	233	−83	3	

Source: FIBA
Rules for classification: 1) Points; 2) Head-to-head results; 3) Points difference; 4) Points scored.
(H) Hosts
Notes:

22 September 2018
Japan	71–84	Spain
Puerto Rico	36–86	Belgium
23 September 2018
Belgium	75–77 (OT)	Japan
Spain	78–53	Puerto Rico
25 September 2018
Japan	69–61	Puerto Rico
Belgium	72–63	Spain

=== Group D ===
Pos	Team	Pld	W	L	PF	PA	PD	Pts	Qualification
1	United States	3	3	0	289	231	+58	6	Quarterfinals
2	China	3	2	1	227	227	0	5	Qualification round
3	Senegal	3	1	2	203	231	−28	4	Qualification round
4	Latvia	3	0	3	206	236	−30	3	

Source: FIBA
Rules for classification: 1) Points; 2) Head-to-head results; 3) Points difference; 4) Points scored.

22 September 2018
Latvia	61–64	China
United States	87–67	Senegal
23 September 2018
Senegal	70–69	Latvia
China	88–100	United States
25 September 2018
Senegal	66–75	China
Latvia	76–102	United States

== Final round ==
Qualification round
26 September
Spain	63
Senegal	48
26 September
China	87
Japan	81
26 September
France	78
Turkey	61
26 September
Nigeria	57
Greece	56

Quarterfinals
28 September
Canada	53
Spain	68
28 September
Australia	83
China	42
28 September
Belgium	86
France	65
28 September
United States	71
Nigeria	40

Semifinals
29 September
Spain	66
Australia	72
29 September
Belgium	77
United States	93

Final
30 September
Australia	56
United States	73
Third place
30 September
Spain	67
Belgium	60

5–8th place

5–8th place semifinals
29 September
Canada	71
China	76
29 September
France	84
Nigeria	62

Fifth place
30 September
China	67
France	81
Seventh place
30 September
Canada	73
Nigeria	72

=== Final ===
30 September 2018
20:00

Boxscore

Australia	56–73	United States
Scoring by quarter: 15–20, 12–15, 11–26, 18–12
Pts: Smith 10; Rebs: Cambage 14; Asts: O'Hea 4		Pts: Griner 15; Rebs: Stewart 8 Asts: Bird 5

Tenerife Sports Pavilion Santiago Martin, San Cristóbal de La Laguna
Attendance: 3,715
Referees: Antonio Conde (ESP), Yu Jung (TPE), Yohan Rosso (FRA)

== Final standings ==
#	Team	Pld	W	L	PF	PA	PD	Preliminary round				FIBA World Ranking		
#	Team	Pld	W	L	PF	PA	PD	Grp	Rank	W–L	GA	Old	New	+/−
1st place, gold medalist(s)	United States	6	6	0	526	404	+122	D	—N/a			1	1	Steady
2nd place, silver medalist(s)	Australia	6	5	1	471	356	+115	B	—N/a			4	3	▲1
3rd place, bronze medalist(s)	Spain	7	5	2	489	429	+60	C	—N/a			2	2	Steady
4th	Belgium	6	3	3	456	401	+55	C	—N/a			28	16	▲12
Eliminated at the quarterfinals
5th	France	7	5	2	532	476	+56	A	—N/a			3	4	▼1
6th	China	7	4	3	499	543	−44	D	—N/a			10	7	▲3
7th	Canada	6	4	2	431	389	+42	A	—N/a			5	5	Steady
8th	Nigeria	7	3	4	448	508	−60	B	—N/a			34	19	▲15
Eliminated at the qualification round
9th	Japan	4	2	2	298	307	−9	C	3rd	2–1	0.723	13	10	▲3
10th	Turkey	4	1	3	256	279	−23	B	3rd	1–2	0.650	7	6	▲1
11th	Greece	4	1	3	235	261	−26	A	3rd	1–2	0.597	20	23	▼3
12th	Senegal	4	1	3	251	294	−43	D	3rd	1–2	0.677	17	17	Steady
Eliminated at the preliminary round
13th	Latvia	3	0	3	206	236	−30	D	4th	0–3	0.687	26	24	▲2
14th	South Korea	3	0	3	169	229	−60	A	4th	0–3	0.563	16	18	▼2
15th	Argentina	3	0	3	150	222	−72	B	4th	0–3	0.500	15	15	Steady
16th	Puerto Rico	3	0	3	150	233	−83	C	4th	0–3	0.500	22	22	Steady

Qualified for the 2020 Summer Olympics

== Awards and statistics ==
=== Awards ===
The All-Star Five was revealed on 30 September 2018.

- MVP: (United States) Breanna Stewart
- (United States) Breanna Stewart
- (United States) Diana Taurasi
- (Spain) Astou Ndour
- (Belgium) Emma Meesseman
- (Australia) Liz Cambage

=== Statistics ===
==== Player tournament averages ====
Points

Name	PPG
(Australia) Liz Cambage	23.8
(Belgium) Emma Meesseman	18.5
(Canada) Kia Nurse	18.2
(United States) Breanna Stewart	16.3
(Belgium) Kim Mestdagh	16.2

Rebounds

Name	RPG
(Belgium) Emma Meesseman	10.7
(Australia) Liz Cambage	10.5
(Nigeria) Evelyn Akhator	9.0
(Spain) Laura Nicholls	8.9
(Japan) Yuki Miyazawa	8.8

Assists

Name	APG
(Belgium) Julie Allemand	8.2
(Japan) Nako Motohashi	5.8
(Spain) Laia Palau	5.7
(Turkey) Işıl Alben	5.3
(United States) Sue Bird	4.8

Blocks

Name	BPG
(Australia) Liz Cambage	2.8
(Belgium) Kyara Linskens	1.8
(United States) Brittney Griner	1.5
(Turkey) Quanitra Hollingsworth	1.5
(China) Han Xu	1.4
(Spain) Astou Ndour	1.4

Steals

Name	SPG
(Japan) Maki Takada	2.8
(Nigeria) Ezinne Kalu	2.4
(France) Sarah Michel	2.0
(Greece) Evanthia Maltsi	2.0
(Japan) Nako Motohashi	1.8

==== Team tournament averages ====
Points

Team	PPG
United States	87.7
Australia	78.5
France	76.0
Belgium	76.0
Japan	74.5

Rebounds

Team	RPG
Australia	48.0
United States	47.3
Nigeria	43.4
Canada	42.2
France	40.6

Assists

Team	APG
Belgium	23.8
United States	23.7
France	23.3
Australia	21.5
China	19.3

Blocks

Team	BPG
Australia	5.3
United States	4.2
Spain	3.9
Belgium	3.5
France	3.4

Steals

Team	SPG
Nigeria	9.9
Japan	9.3
Canada	9.2
Spain	9.0
France	8.6

==== Tournament game highs ====
Statistic	Player	Total	Opponent	Team	Total	Opponent
Points	(Australia) Liz Cambage	34	Nigeria (22 Sep)	United States	102	Latvia (25 Sep)
Rebounds	(Belgium) Emma Meesseman	18	Japan (23 Sep)	United States	62	Nigeria (28 Sep)
Assists	(Belgium) Julie Allemand	13	France (28 Sep)	France	30	Nigeria (29 Sep)
Steals	(Puerto Rico) Pamela Rosado (Nigeria) Ezinne Kalu	5	Spain (23 Sep); United States (28 Sep)	Nigeria	13	Greece (26 Sep); France (29 Sep)
Blocks	(Australia) Liz Cambage	5	United States (30 Sep)	Australia	8	Nigeria (22 Sep); United States (30 Sep)

== Marketing ==
The logo and branding identity was unveiled on 5 February 2018 at the La Laguna Gran Hotel in San Cristóbal de La Laguna, the logo is inspired by the treasures of the island of Tenerife, its coastlines and its heart of Spain.

The Mascot Tina the Turtle were also unveiled at the ceremony in the town hall of Santa Cruz de Tenerife on 7 August 2018, 6 Weeks before the Tournament kick off the mascot name is a short form of Tinerfina which means Coming from or Living from Tenerife, Both Logo and the Mascot were designed by a Tenerife Artist Raul Pena
