= Iréne Bognini =

Ivorian basketball player

Iréne Bognini (born April 5, 1997, in Ivory Coast) is an Ivorian basketball player representing the national women's basketball team. She went to college at Catholique Saint Jean Bosco. She is 5 feet 11 inches (180 cm) tall. She is from Treichville, Abidjan, Côte d'Ivoire.

In October 2023, Bognini signed with French club Réveil Bressuirais.

== National team history ==
Bognini's performance is outlined for both the Senior National Team and the National Team Youth across various events and years. In the 2023 FIBA Women's AfroBasket, she played three games, averaging 6 points per game (PPG), 4.3 rebounds per game (RPG), 0.7 assists per game (APG), and earning an efficiency (EFF) rating of 5. In the 2019 FIBA Women's Afrobasket, Bognini participated in two games, averaging 1 point, 3.5 rebounds, 0.5 assists, and an EFF rating of 0.5. Additionally, in the 2017 FIBA Women's Afrobasket, she played nine games, averaging 6.7 points, 1.7 rebounds, 0.8 assists, and an EFF rating of 4.7. Overall, her total average across these senior team events stands at 3.7 points, 3.3 rebounds, 0.6 assists, and an EFF rating of 2.7.

In her performances for the National Team Youth, Bognini participated in the 2014 Afrobasket U18 Women, playing seven games with averages of 6.6 points, 7.7 rebounds, 1.3 assists, and an EFF rating of 9.4. Furthermore, in the 2013 FIBA Africa U16 Championship for Women, she played six games, averaging 18.5 points, 6.3 rebounds, 0.3 assists, and an EFF rating of 13. Her total average across these youth team events stands at 12.6 points, 7 rebounds, 0.8 assists, and an EFF rating of 11.2.
