= Nako Motohashi =

Japanese basketball player

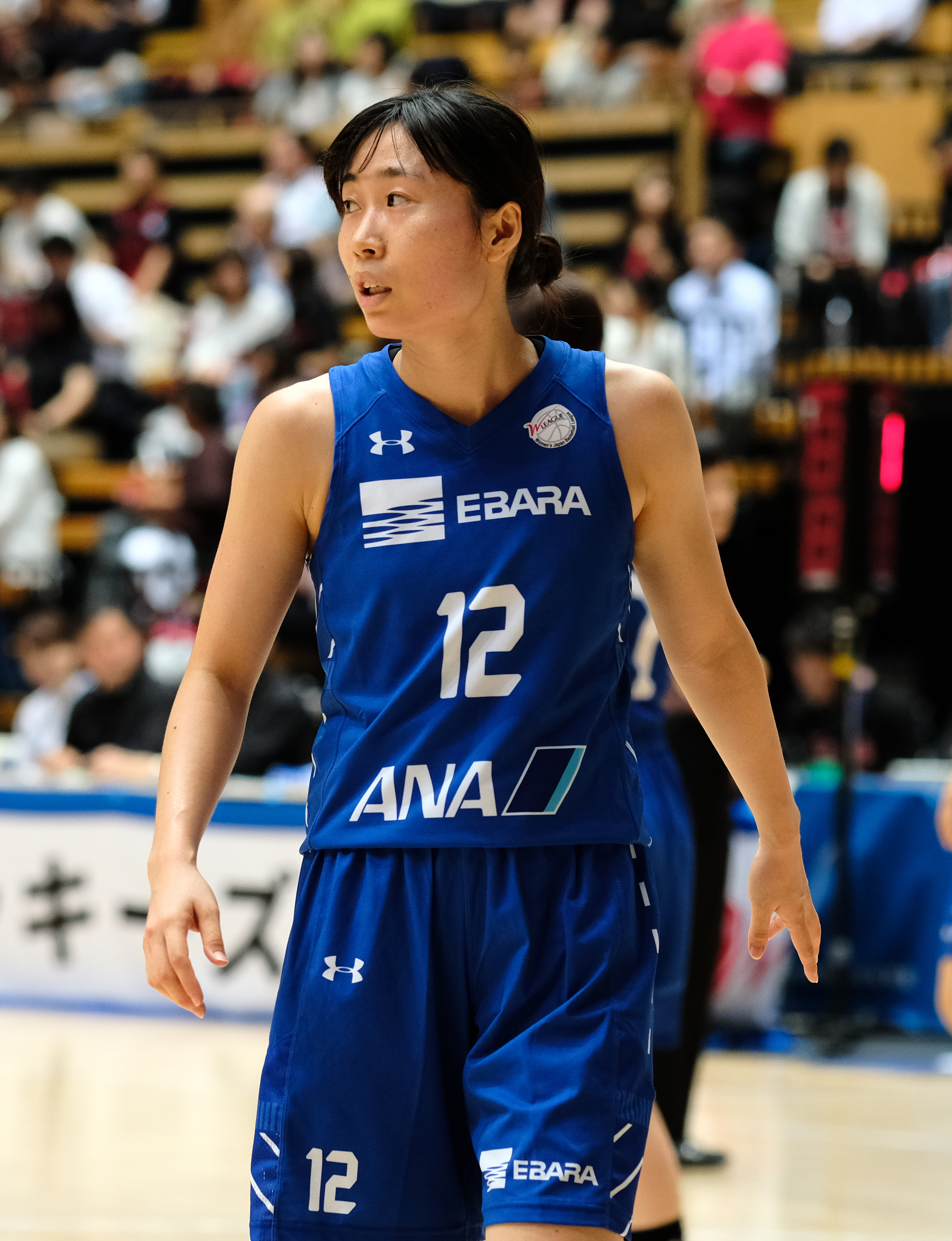
- Motohashi in 2019

No. 12 – Haneda Vickies
- Position: Point guard
- League: WJBL

Personal information
- Born: 10 October 1993 (age 33)
- Listed height: 5 ft 5 in (1.65 m)
- Listed weight: 121 lb (55 kg)

Career information
- WNBA draft: 2015: undrafted
Medals
Women's basketball
Representing Japan
Olympic Games
Silver medal – second place	2020 Tokyo	Team
FIBA Asia Cup
Gold medal – first place	2019 India
Silver medal – second place	2023 Australia
Asian Games
Silver medal – second place	2022 Hangzhou

Nako Motohashi (本橋 菜子, Motohashi Nako; born 10 October 1993) is a Japanese basketball player for Haneda Vickies and the Japanese national team. and at the 2020 Summer Olympics, winning a silver medal.

== Career ==
She graduated from Waseda University.

She participated at the 2018 FIBA Women's Basketball World Cup.
