= Ezinne Kalu =

Nigerian basketball player (born 1992)

No. 23 – Zhejiang Golden Bulls
- Position: Point guard
- League: WCBA

Personal information
- Born: 26 June 1992 (age 34) Newark, New Jersey, U.S.
- Listed height: 1.73 m (5 ft 8 in)
- Listed weight: 80 kg (176 lb)

Career information
- High school: Science Park Chargers
- College: Savannah State (2015)
- WNBA draft: 2015: undrafted
- Playing career: 2015–present

Career history
- 2015–2016: Clube Desportivo Torres
- 2016–2017: Olivais Coimbra
- 2017–2018: Vasas Akademia
- 2018–2019: Rutronik Stars Keltern
- 2019–2022: Landerneau Bretagne Basket
- 2022: Kayseri Basketbol
- 2022–2023: Dynamo Kursk
- 2023–2024: Oxygen Roma
- 2024: Atlanta Dream
- 2024–2025: Zhejiang Golden Bulls

Career highlights
- Most Valuable Player 2019 Women's Afrobasket; First-team All-MEAC (2015)
- Stats at Basketball Reference
Medals
Women's basketball
Representing Nigeria
AfroBasket
Gold medal – first place	2017 Mali
Gold medal – first place	2019 Senegal
Gold medal – first place	2021 Cameroon
Gold medal – first place	2025 Ivory Coast

Ezinne Kalu O.O.N. (born 26 June 1992) is a professional basketball player for the Zhejiang Golden Bulls of the Women's Chinese Basketball Association (WCBA). Born in the United States, she represents Nigeria at international level. In the 2017, 2019 and 2021 Afrobasket events, she represented D'Tigress, Africa's highest-ranked side and won three straight championship for them. She was named 2019 Women's Afrobasket Most Valuable Player (MVP).

== Early life ==
She was born in Newark, New Jersey to Gwendolyn Covington and Joseph Kalu. Her mother was born and raised in Greenville, SC. Her father is Nigerian.

Kalu attended Science Park High School in Newark, New Jersey. She was the first woman in the school's history to score over 2,000 points. Her jersey was retired in December 2017. After graduating in 2010, Kalu received a full scholarship to HBCU Savannah State University in Savannah, GA. Her team won their first MEAC Championship in 2015. She was also the first to score over 2,000 career points in the school. She graduated in May 2015 with a bachelor's degree in African Studies.

== Professional career ==
After graduating from Savannah State, Kalu spent two seasons in the Portuguese Championship. In 2015, she signed with Clube Desportivo Torres Novas (22.7 points, 6.0 rebounds and 5.1 assists). At the end of her first season in Portugal, she signed for Olivais Coimbra (21.5 points, 4.0 rebounds and 4.3 assists).

In 2017, Kalu signed with the Hungarian club Vasas Akademia for one season (17.0 points, 3.4 rebounds and 3.9 assists).

In November 2018, she signed with the German club Keltern. She helped Keltern qualify for the final of the German Championship (13.6 points and 2.5 assists).

In 2019, she joined the French side Landerneau BB, averaging 15.7 points, 3.4 rebounds and 3.2 assists in the 2019-2020 season.

- 2021 AfroBasket tournament champion
- 2020 Guard of the Year, France 1st Division
- 2020 1st Team, All-Imports France League
- 2020 1st Team, All-French Player
- 2020 Qualified for the Tokyo Olympics (July 2021)
- 2020 All-Star top 5 of the Olympic qualifying tournament in Serbia
- 2020 Voted Top 12 Best Player of Africa
- 2019 1st woman to be sponsored by AFA Sports
- 2019 AfroBasket tournament champion (5-0 record)
- 2019 MVP of AfroBasket tournament
- 2019 Top 5 player of AfroBasket tournament
- 2018 Co-Captain of the Nigeria women's national basketball team
- 2017 Defensive Player of the Year, Budapest 1st Division
- 2017 AfroBasket tournament champion (8-0 record)
- 2016-17 Captain of the Nigerian women's national team
- 2016 Guard of the Year, Portugal 1st Division

== International career ==
Kalu played for the Nigerian national team at the 2016 FIBA women's Olympic qualifying tournament. She participated in the 2017 Women's Afrobasket, where she averaged 12 pts and 3 assists per game. The team won the tournament. Kalu participated in the 2018 FIBA Women's Basketball World Cup in Spain for the Nigerian national basketball team. She averaged 10.6 points, 3 rebounds and 4.1 assists per game during the tournament.

Kalu then participated in the 2019 Women's Afrobasket, where she was named Most Valuable player of the tournament. She averaged 14 points and 3 assists during the tournament. She competed at 2020 FIBA Olympic qualifying tournament, averaging 16 points, 2.7 rebounds and 4.3 assists per game. She was named to the all Star five of the FIBA Olympic qualifying tournament held in Serbia

Kalu also participated in Tokyo 2020 Olympics in July 2021 and was part of the Nigerian team that narrowly lost to Team USA, leading the team with 16 points. In September 2021, she participated in the Afrobasket tournament emerging champion with Nigeria's D'Tigress averaging 12.4 points, 3 rebounds and 4.6 assists per game. She was named to the All Star team of the tournament.

== Career statistics ==
Legend
GP	Games played	GS	Games started	MPG	Minutes per game	RPG	Rebounds per game
APG	Assists per game	SPG	Steals per game	BPG	Blocks per game	PPG	Points per game
TO	Turnovers per game	FG%	Field-goal percentage	3P%	3-point field-goal percentage	FT%	Free-throw percentage
**Bold**	Career best	°	League leader

=== WNBA ===
==== Regular season ====
Stats current through end of 2024 season

WNBA regular season statistics
Year	Team	GP	GS	MPG	FG%	3P%	FT%	RPG	APG	SPG	BPG	TO	PPG
2024	Atlanta	1	0	13.0	.333	.000	.500	1.0	0.0	1.0	0.0	0.0	3.0
**Career**	1 year, 1 team	1	0	13.0	.333	.000	.500	1.0	0.0	1.0	0.0	0.0	3.0

==== Playoffs ====
WNBA playoff statistics
Year	Team	GP	GS	MPG	FG%	3P%	FT%	RPG	APG	SPG	BPG	TO	PPG
2024	Atlanta	1	0	15.0	.250	.000	.667	0.0	2.0	1.0	0.0	2.0	4.0
**Career**	1 year, 1 team	1	0	15.0	.250	.000	.667	0.0	2.0	1.0	0.0	2.0	4.0

=== College ===
NCAA statistics
Year	Team	GP	GS	MPG	FG%	3P%	FT%	RPG	APG	SPG	BPG	TO	PPG
2010–11	Savannah State	26	25	-	41.7	30.1	61.7	3.2	2.9	3.1	0.2	4.3	15.4
2011–12	Savannah State	30	28	-	32.0	21.9	71.7	4.0	2.8	2.7	0.2	5.2	**17.6**
2012–13	Savannah State	12	11	31.3	**52.6**	**40.7**	66.7	2.7	2.9	2.8	0.1	4.3	13.4
2013–14	Savannah State	**32**	23	29.9	40.0	25.9	66.8	3.8	**3.4**	2.7	0.1	**3.2**	16.1
2014–15	Savannah State	31	**31**	**35.0**	41.5	25.0	**73.9**	**4.4**	3.2	**3.3**	0.2	3.3	16.5
**Career**		131	118	32.3	39.1	26.1	68.6	3.8	3.1	2.9	0.2	4.0	16.2
