= Atonye Nyingifa =

Nigerian-American basketball player

No. 21 – Porta XI Ensino
- Position: Power forward
- League: LFB

Personal information
- Born: 8 December 1990 (age 35) Torrance, United States
- Listed height: 1.83 m (6 ft 0 in)

Career information
- High school: Redondo Union High School (Redondo Beach, California)
- College: UCLA (2014)
- WNBA draft: 2014: undrafted

Career highlights
- 2x All Pac-12 (2013, 2014); Pac-12 All-Freshman Team (2009)
Medals
Women's basketball
Representing Nigeria
AfroBasket
Gold medal – first place	2017 Mali
Gold medal – first place	2019 Senegal

Atonye Nyingifa (born 8 December 1990) is a Nigerian-American basketball player for Porta XI Ensino and the Nigerian national team.

She participated at the 2017 Women's Afrobasket.
