= Yuki Miyazawa =

Japanese basketball player (born 1993)

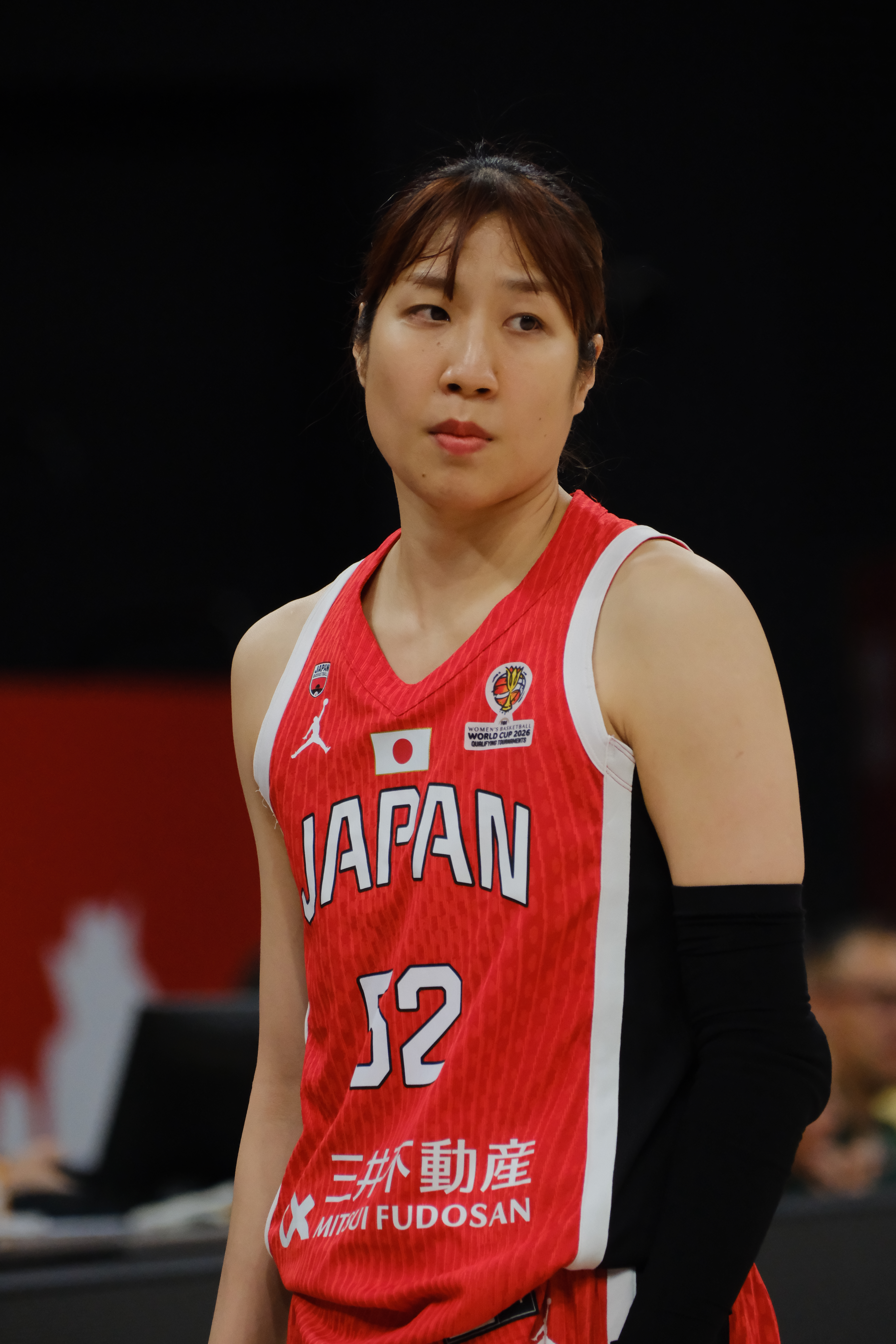
- Miyazawa in 2026

No. 52 – Fujitsu Red Wave
- Position: Power forward
- League: W LEAGUE

Personal information
- Born: 2 June 1993 (age 33) Izumi-ku, Yokohama, Kanagawa, Japan
- Listed height: 183 cm (6 ft 0 in)
- Listed weight: 73 kg (161 lb)

Career information
- High school: Kanazawa Comprehensive (Kanazawa-ku, Yokohama)
- WNBA draft: 2015: undrafted

Career history
- 2012-2021: ENEOS Sunflowers
- 2021-present: Fujitsu Red Wave
Medals
Women's basketball
Representing Japan
Olympic Games
Silver medal – second place	2020 Tokyo	Team
FIBA Asia Cup
Gold medal – first place	2013 Bangkok
Gold medal – first place	2015 Wuhan
Gold medal – first place	2017 India
Gold medal – first place	2019 India
Silver medal – second place	2025 China
FIBA Asia Under-16 Championship for Women
Silver medal – second place	2009 Pune	Japan U17
East Asian Games
Silver medal – second place	2013 Tianjin
Women's 3x3 basketball
FIBA 3x3 Under-18 World Cup
Bronze medal – third place	2011 Rimini	Japan 3x3 U18

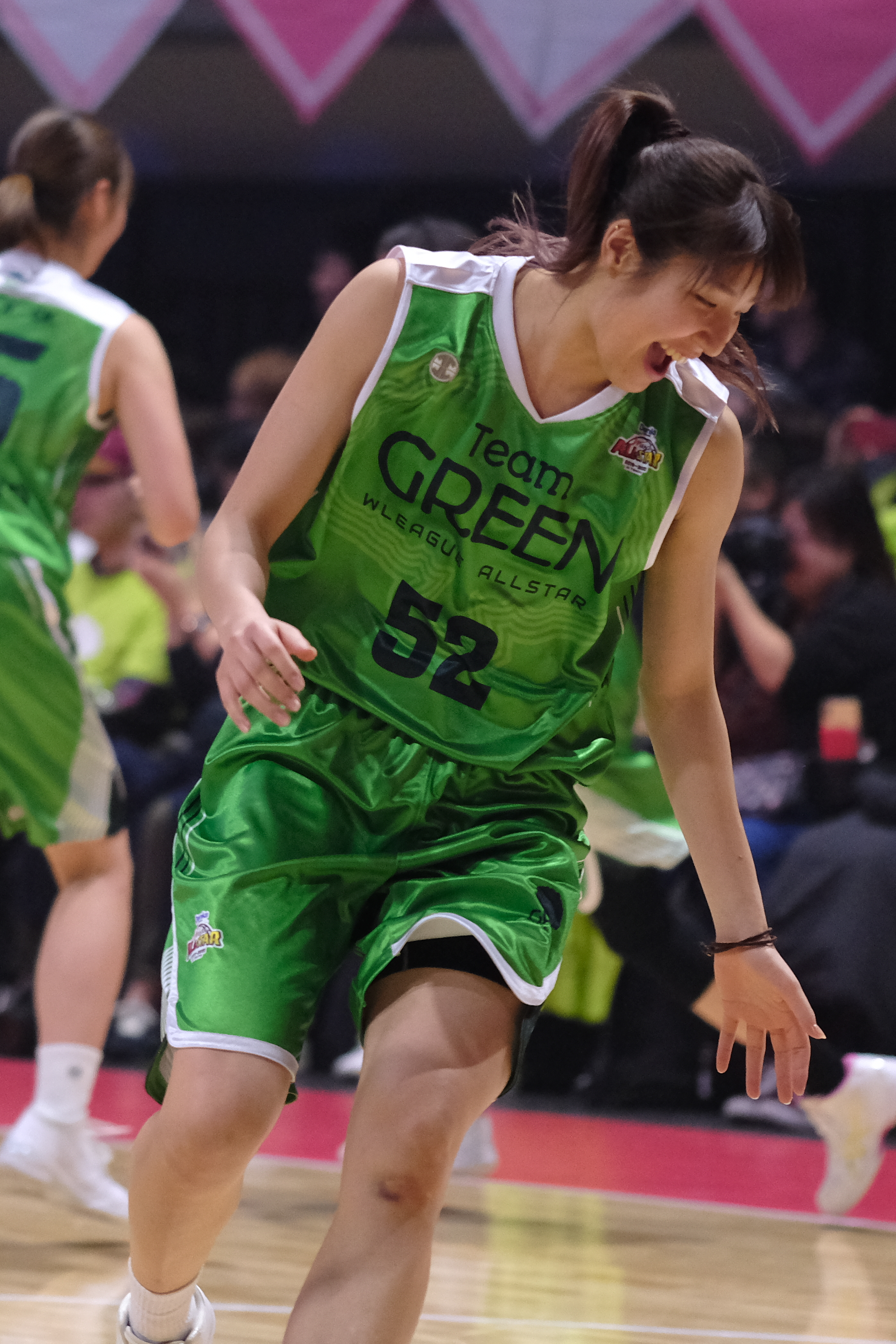
Miyazawa in 2020

Yuki Miyazawa (宮澤 夕貴, Miyazawa Yuki; born 2 June 1993) is a Japanese professional basketball player for the Fujitsu Red Wave of the Women's Japan Basketball League (WJBL). She represented Japan in the basketball competition at the 2016 Summer Olympics in Rio and won a silver medal with the Japanese national team at the 2020 Summer Olympics, held in Tokyo, Japan.

Her nickname is Earth (アース), referring to a high school teacher telling her that she wanted her to grow as big as the earth, and also taking the first and last characters of Amaterasu (Ōmikami), the Sun Goddess.

== History ==
Influenced by her older sister, Miyazawa started playing basketball during her first year of elementary school. Later, she joined the prestigious Kanazawa Comprehensive High School basketball team, where she became the team's leading scorer and was appointed captain at the start of her sophomore year.

After graduating high school, Miyazawa joined ENEOS Sunflowers (at the time known as JX and later as JX-ENEOS) in 2012 and played with them for 9 seasons, before joining Fujitsu Red Wave in 2021.

== Awards ==
- W LEAGUE Best 5 (Forward): 2015, 2017, 2018, 2019, 2020
- Playoff MVP: 2019
- Playoff Best 5 (Forward): 2019
- Empress Cup MVP: 2018, 2019
