= Evelyn Akhator =

Nigerian basketball player (born 1995)

No. 23 – Flammes Carolo Basketball
- Position: Power forward / center
- League: LFB

Personal information
- Born: 3 February 1995 (age 31) Lagos, Lagos State, Nigeria
- Listed height: 6 ft 3 in (1.91 m)
- Listed weight: 180 lb (82 kg)

Career information
- College: Chipola (2013–2015); Kentucky (2015–2017)
- WNBA draft: 2017: 1st round, 3rd overall pick
- Drafted by: Dallas Wings
- Playing career: 2017–present

Career history
- 2017–2018: Dallas Wings
- 2017–2018: WBC Dynamo Novosibirsk
- 2018–2019: Besiktas
- 2019: CB Avenida
- 2019–2022: Flammes Carolo
- 2022–2023: Basket Landes
- 2023–present: Landerneau Bretagne Basket
- Stats at Basketball Reference

Osaretin Evelyn Akhator (born 3 February 1995) is a Nigerian professional basketball forward/center for Landerneau Bretagne Basket of the Ligue Féminine de Basketball. She was drafted by the Dallas Wings of the Women's National Basketball Association (WNBA) as the 3rd overall pick in the 2017 WNBA draft.

== WNBA career ==
Evelyn was drafted as the 3rd overall pick in the 2017 WNBA draft by the Dallas Wings. She played 15 games in her rookie season for the Dallas side where she averaged 0.9 points per game, 0.2 blocks per game, 0.1 steal per game. She was waived by the Dallas Wings on 13 May 2018.

On 13 February 2019, Akhator returned to the WNBA by signing for the Chicago Sky on a training camp deal.

== International career ==
Evelyn Represents the Nigerian national basketball team. She made her first appearance for the team during the 2017 FIBA Afrobasket tournament in Mali. Evelyn averaged 15.3 points and 9.5 rebounds per game during the tournament and also made the top 5 players list. Evelyn was part of the Nigerian national basketball team at the 2018 FIBA Women's Basketball World Cup where she averaged 12.6 points,9 rebounds and 1.4 assists during the tournament.

== Overseas career ==
Akhator signed with the Russian side WBC Dynamo Novosibirsk in 2017. She averaged 12.4 points and 8.5 rebounds per game.

On 22 August 2018, Akhator signed with the Turkish Besiktas basketball team. She averaged 15 points and 11 rebounds per game in the Turkish league, and she averaged 15 points and 11 rebounds in the Eurocup tournament, having played more than 30 minutes per game in both competitions.

Ahkator signed with the Spanish side CB Avenida on 15 May 2019.

In November, 2019, Ahkator signed with the French side Flammes Carolo basketball team.

Akhator signed with Basket Landes for the 2022–2023 season.

In June 2023, she signed with Landerneau Bretagne Basket.

== Career statistics ==
Legend
GP	Games played	GS	Games started	MPG	Minutes per game	RPG	Rebounds per game
APG	Assists per game	SPG	Steals per game	BPG	Blocks per game	PPG	Points per game
TO	Turnovers per game	FG%	Field-goal percentage	3P%	3-point field-goal percentage	FT%	Free-throw percentage
**Bold**	Career best	°	League leader

=== College ===
Legend
GP	Games played	GS	Games started	MPG	Minutes per game
FG%	Field goal percentage	3P%	3-point field goal percentage	FT%	Free throw percentage
RPG	Rebounds per game	APG	Assists per game	SPG	Steals per game
BPG	Blocks per game	PPG	Points per game	**Bold**	Career high

Year	Team	GP	Points	FG%	3P%	FT%	RPG	APG	SPG	BPG	PPG
2015–16	Kentucky	**33**	380	51.0%	**100.0%**	57.8%	9.2	0.7	1.1	**1.0**	11.5
2016–17	Kentucky	**33**	**526**	**56.8%**	0.0%	**68.9%**	**10.8**	**1.0**	**1.4**	0.9	**15.9**
Career		66	906	54.1%	33.3%	64.5%	10.0	0.8	1.2	0.9	13.7

=== WNBA regular season ===
Year	Team	GP	GS	MPG	FG%	3P%	FT%	RPG	APG	SPG	BPG	TO	PPG
2017	Dallas	15	0	4.1	.250	—	.833	0.6	0.0	0.1	0.2	0.3	0.9
Career	1 year, 1 team	15	0	4.1	.250	—	.833	0.6	0.0	0.1	0.2	0.3	0.9

== Awards and recognition ==
In the 2018 Nigerian Sports Awards, Akhator won the Best Sportwoman award and the Basketball player award.

== Personal life ==
Akhator is from a family of three. Her parents and her older sibling reside in Nigeria. Her mother Benedicta died in a road accident.
