= Pabellón Insular Santiago Martín =

Indoor arena in Tenerife, Spain

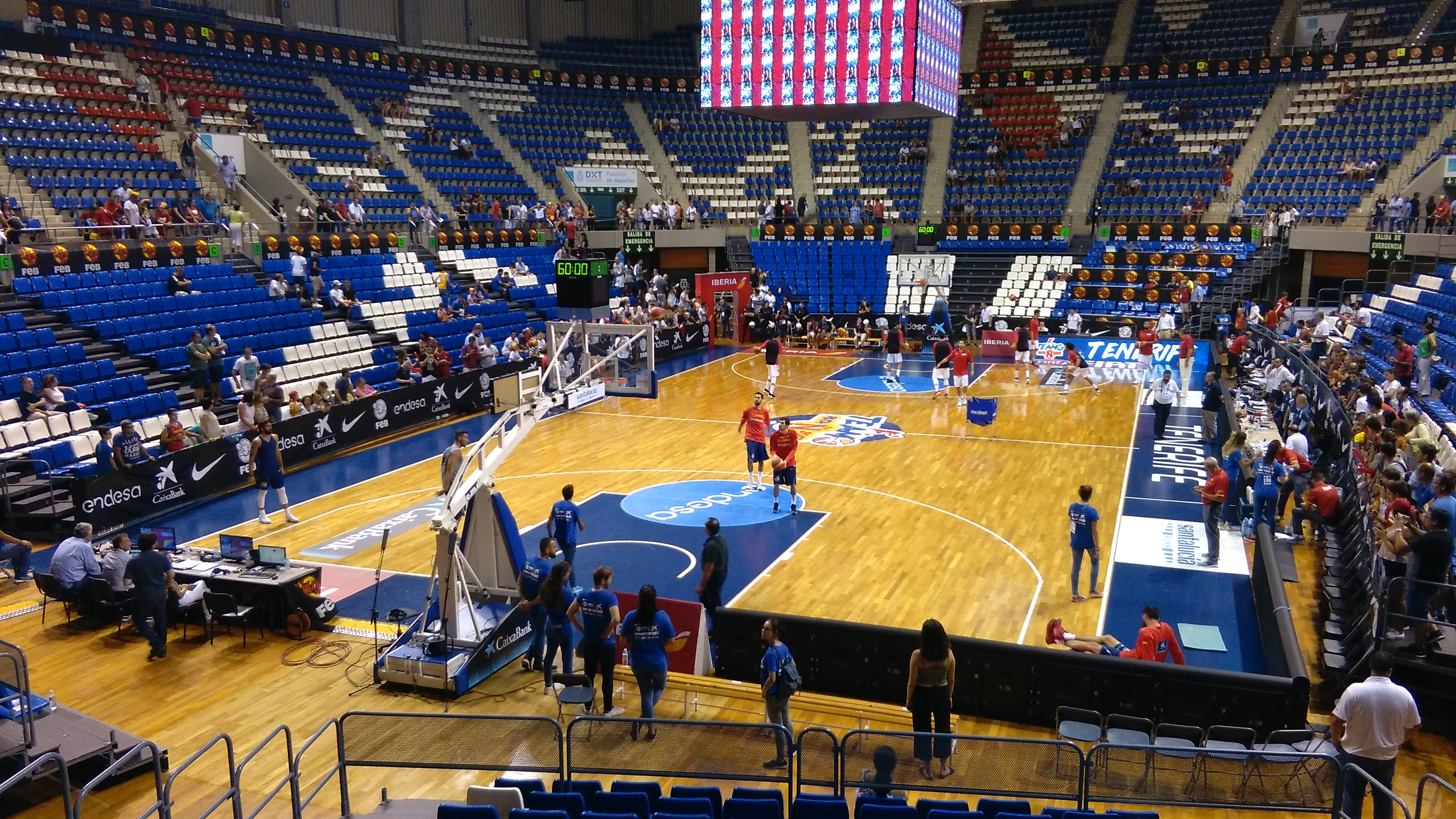
- The Santiago Martín in August 2017
- Interactive map of Pabellón Insular Santiago Martín
- Location: San Cristóbal de La Laguna, Tenerife, Spain
- Coordinates: 28°27′30″N 16°17′49″W
- Capacity: Basketball: 5,100
- Surface: Parquet floor

Construction
- Opened: 1999; 27 years ago

Tenants
- Tenerife CB (1996–2011); CB 1939 Canarias (2010–present)

Pabellón Insular Santiago Martín is an indoor arena that is located in San Cristóbal de La Laguna, Tenerife, Spain. It is primarily used for basketball games, and is the home arena of the Spanish professional basketball club, Iberostar Tenerife of the Liga ACB.

The venue is nicknamed La Hamburguesa (The Hamburger), as the exterior design resembles a hamburger bun.

== Structure and features ==
The Pabellón Insular Santiago Martín can hold 5,100 people for basketball games, and it offers 2,000 square meters of floor space. The facilities remain open all year long, without interruption.

The pavilion also provides the following facilities for athletic use: 5 large locker rooms and 4 "double" locker rooms. Additionally, a gymnasium, infirmary, video and press room are available as well as a rehab room for athletes.

== History ==
The arena was opened in 1999. Pabellón Insular Santiago Martín is the property of the Cabildo de Tenerife (the Island Council of Tenerife), and the Ayuntamiento de La Laguna (the La Laguna City Council). Through an agreement with the Comisión de Gobierno de la Corporación Insular, the management of the pavilion was ceded to the Gestión Insular para el Deporte, la Cultura y el Ocio (the Tenerife Sport, Culture and Leisure Management, also known as IDECO).

The arena hosted the 2017 Basketball Champions League Final Four, as Iberostar Tenerife hosted the tournament. Tenerife won its first Champions League title in the Santiago Martín. The arena also hosted the 2017 FIBA Intercontinental Cup final match between Tenerife and Guaros de Lara. The arena was also used a host venue of the 2018 FIBA Women's World Cup, and the 2020 FIBA Intercontinental Cup.

Events and tenants
| Preceded by Fraport Arena; Frankfurt | FIBA Intercontinental Cup; Final Venue; 2017 | Succeeded by Carioca Arena 1 Rio de Janeiro |
| Preceded by none | FIBA Champions League Final Four; Venue; 2017 | Succeeded by O.A.C.A. Olympic Indoor Hall; Athens |
| Preceded by Carioca Arena 1 Rio de Janeiro | FIBA Intercontinental Cup; Final Venue; 2020 | Succeeded by Estadio Obras Sanitarias; Buenos Aires |
