= Uruguay women's national under-17 basketball team =

Uruguay
- FIBA zone: FIBA Americas
- National federation: Federación Uruguaya de Básquetbol

U19 World Cup
- Appearances: None

U18 AmeriCup
- Appearances: None

U17 South American Championship
- Appearances: 10
- Medals: None

The Uruguay women's national under-17 basketball team is a national basketball team of Uruguay, administered by the Federación Uruguaya de Básquetbol - "FUBB". It represents the country in international under-17 women's basketball competitions.

== FIBA South America Under-17 Championship for Women participations ==
Year	Result
1976	5th
1987	6th
2011	6th
2013	8th
2015	8th
2017	8th
2019	5th
2022	4th
2023	8th
2025	8th

== See also ==
- Uruguay women's national basketball team
- Uruguay women's national under-15 basketball team
- Uruguay men's national under-19 basketball team
