= U19 basketball =

U19 basketball may refer to:

- FIBA Under-19 Basketball World Cup
- United States women's national under-19 basketball team
