= Peru women's national under-17 basketball team =

Peru
- FIBA zone: FIBA Americas
- National federation: Federación Deportiva Peruana de Basketball

U19 World Cup
- Appearances: None

U18 AmeriCup
- Appearances: None

U17 South American Championship
- Appearances: 12
- Medals: (bronze) Bronze: 1 (1986)

The Peru women's national under-17 basketball team is a national basketball team of Peru, administered by the Peru Basketball Federation (Spanish: Federación Deportiva Peruana de Basketball) (F.D.P.B.). It represents the country in international under-17 women's basketball competitions.

Currently, Peru is not a member of FIBA.

== FIBA South America Under-17 Championship for Women participations ==
Year	Result
1981	4th
1986	3rd place, bronze medalist(s)
1990	5th
1998	6th
2000	5th
2004	5th

Year	Result
2005	6th
2007	6th
2011	7th
2013	7th
2015	6th
2017	6th

== See also ==
- Peru women's national basketball team
- Peru women's national under-15 basketball team
- Peru men's national under-17 basketball team
