= FIBA U17 Women's South American Championship =

International youth basketball competition

- Most recent season or competition: 2025 FIBA U17 Women's South American Championship
- Formerly: FIBA South American Championship for Junior Women; FIBA South America Under-17 Championship for Women
- Sport: Basketball
- Founded: 1976
- Organizing body: FIBA Americas
- No. of teams: 10 max.
- Continent: South America
- Most recent champion: Argentina (5th title)
- Most titles: Brazil (13 titles)
- Qualification: FIBA Under-18 Women's AmeriCup
- Related competitions: FIBA U15 Women's South American Championship
- Website: www.fiba.basketball/history

The FIBA U17 Women's South American Championship is a basketball tournament held about every two years among the ten countries of South America and is organized in part by FIBA Americas. The tournament serves as a gateway to the FIBA Under-18 Women's AmeriCup. Originally, this competition was played in the under-18 age category, and since 2005 it has been played in the under-17 age category.

== Summaries ==
Year	Host	Gold	Silver	Bronze
1976	Paraguay (Asunción)	Brazil	Paraguay	Argentina
1981	Peru (Lima)	Brazil	Colombia	Argentina
1986	Colombia (Cúcuta)	Brazil	Colombia	Peru
1987	Argentina (Mar del Plata)	Argentina	Brazil	Chile
1990	Ecuador (Ibarra)	Brazil	Argentina	Ecuador
1992	Chile (Santiago)	Brazil	Argentina	Colombia
1995	Brazil (São Roque)	Colombia	Brazil	Argentina
1996	Ecuador (Quito)	Argentina	Brazil	Colombia
1998	Chile (Ancud)	Brazil	Argentina	Bolivia
2000	Venezuela (San Felipe)	Brazil	Argentina	Venezuela
2002	Chile (Santiago)	Ecuador	Chile	Paraguay
2004	Bolivia (Quillacollo)	Brazil	Argentina	Bolivia
2005	Paraguay (Asunción)	Argentina	Brazil	Paraguay
2007	Venezuela (Guanare)	Venezuela	Argentina	Brazil
2009	Chile (Santiago)	Brazil	Chile	Argentina
2011	Colombia (Pasto)	Colombia	Argentina	Brazil
2013	Ecuador (Portoviejo)	Brazil	Argentina	Chile
2015	Paraguay (Asunción)	Brazil	Venezuela	Argentina
2017	Bolivia (Sucre)	Argentina	Colombia	Chile
2019	Colombia (Barranquilla)	Colombia	Brazil	Argentina
2022	Argentina (Buenos Aires)	Brazil	Argentina	Colombia
2023	Colombia (Bucaramanga)	Brazil	Colombia	Argentina
2025	Paraguay (Asunción)	Argentina	Venezuela	Paraguay

== Medal table ==
Rank	Nation	Gold	Silver	Bronze	Total
1	Brazil	13	5	2	20
2	Argentina	5	9	7	21
3	Colombia	3	4	3	10
4	Venezuela	1	2	1	4
5	Ecuador	1	0	1	2
6	Chile	0	2	3	5
7	Paraguay	0	1	3	4
8	Bolivia	0	0	2	2
9	Peru	0	0	1	1
Totals (9 entries)		23	23	23	69

== Participation details ==
Team	(Paraguay); 1976	(Peru); 1981	(Colombia); 1986	(Argentina); 1987	(Ecuador); 1990	(Chile); 1992	(Brazil); 1995	(Ecuador); 1996	(Chile); 1998	(Venezuela); 2000	(Chile); 2002	(Bolivia); 2004	(Paraguay); 2005	(Venezuela); 2007	(Chile); 2009	(Colombia); 2011	(Ecuador); 2013	(Paraguay); 2015	(Bolivia); 2017	(Colombia); 2019	(Argentina); 2022	(Colombia); 2023	(Paraguay); 2025
Argentina	3rd	3rd	4th	1st	2nd	2nd	3rd	1st	2nd	2nd	—	2nd	1st	2nd	3rd	2nd	2nd	3rd	1st	3rd	2nd	3rd	1st
Bolivia	—	5th	—	—	—	7th	—	8th	3rd	8th	—	3rd	5th	—	—	—	—	—	7th	—	7th	7th	9th
Brazil	1st	1st	1st	2nd	1st	1st	2nd	2nd	1st	1st	—	1st	2nd	3rd	1st	3rd	1st	1st	—	2nd	1st	1st	4th
Chile	—	—	—	3rd	7th	4th	—	6th	5th	7th	2nd	—	4th	5th	2nd	4th	3rd	7th	3rd	7th	6th	9th	6th
Colombia	—	2nd	2nd	—	4th	3rd	1st	3rd	4th	4th	—	—	—	—	7th	1st	—	—	2nd	1st	3rd	2nd	5th
Ecuador	4th	—	5th	4th	3rd	—	—	4th	8th	6th	1st	—	8th	4th	4th	5th	4th	5th	5th	4th	5th	6th	7th
Paraguay	2nd	—	—	—	—	6th	—	7th	—	—	3rd	6th	3rd	—	6th	—	6th	4th	—	6th	9th	5th	3rd
Peru	—	4th	3rd	—	5th	—	—	—	6th	5th	—	5th	6th	6th	—	7th	7th	6th	6th	—	—	—	—
Uruguay	5th	—	—	6th	—	—	—	—	—	—	—	—	—	—	—	6th	8th	8th	8th	5th	4th	8th	8th
Venezuela	—	—	6th	5th	6th	5th	4th	5th	7th	3rd	—	4th	7th	1st	5th	—	5th	2nd	4th	8th	8th	4th	2nd

== See also ==
- FIBA U15 Women's South American Championship
- FIBA U15 South American Championship
- FIBA U17 South American Championship
- FIBA South America Under-21 Championship for Men (defunct)
