= Bolivia women's national under-17 and under-18 basketball team =

Bolivia
- FIBA zone: FIBA Americas
- National federation: Federación Boliviana de Básquetbol

U19 World Cup
- Appearances: None

U18 AmeriCup
- Appearances: 1
- Medals: None

U17 South American Championship
- Appearances: 11
- Medals: (bronze) Bronze: 2 (1998, 2004)

The Bolivia women's national under-17 and under-18 basketball team is a national basketball team of Bolivia, administered by the Federación Boliviana de Básquetbol (FBB). It represents the country in international under-17 and under-18 women's basketball competitions.

== FIBA South America Under-17 Championship for Women participations ==
Year	Result
1981	5th
1992	7th
1996	8th
1998	3rd place, bronze medalist(s)
2000	8th
2004	3rd place, bronze medalist(s)

Year	Result
2005	5th
2017	7th
2022	7th
2023	7th
2025	9th

== FIBA Under-18 Women's AmeriCup participations ==
Year	Result
2004	8th

== See also ==
- Bolivia women's national basketball team
- Bolivia women's national under-15 basketball team
- Bolivia men's national under-17 basketball team
