= 2025 FIBA U17 Women's South American Championship =

International youth basketball tournament

23rd FIBA Under-17 Women's South American Basketball Championship

Tournament details
- Host country: Paraguay
- City: Asunción
- Dates: 20–26 October 2025
- Teams: 9 (from 1 sub-confederation)
- Venue: 1 (in 1 host city)

Final positions
- Champions: Argentina (5th title)
- Runners-up: Venezuela
- Third place: Paraguay

Official website
- www.fiba.basketball

The 2025 FIBA U17 Women's South American Championship was the 23rd edition of the South American basketball championship for under-17 women's national teams. The tournament was played at the SND Arena in Asunción, Paraguay, from 20 to 26 October 2025.

Argentina won this competition for the fifth time, as they defeated Venezuela in the final, 67–46.

This tournament also served as a qualification for the 2026 FIBA U18 Women's AmeriCup, where the top three teams qualified.

== Participating teams ==
- Argentina
- Bolivia
- Brazil
- Chile
- Colombia
- Ecuador
- Paraguay
- Uruguay
- Venezuela

== First round ==
In the first round, the teams were drawn into two groups. The first two teams from each group advanced to the semifinals; the third- and fourth-placed teams advanced to the 5th–8th place playoffs; the fifth-placed team in Group A finished 9th overall.

All times are local (Paraguay Time; UTC-3).

=== Group A ===
Pos	Team	Pld	W	L	PF	PA	PD	Pts	Qualification
1	Argentina	4	4	0	290	199	+91	8	Semifinals
2	Brazil	4	3	1	262	205	+57	7	Semifinals
3	Uruguay	4	2	2	249	260	−11	6	5th–8th place playoffs
4	Ecuador	4	1	3	183	254	−71	5	5th–8th place playoffs
5	Bolivia	4	0	4	212	278	−66	4	

Source: FIBA

20 October 2025
16:30

Boxscore

Bolivia	56–69	Brazil
Scoring by quarter: 19–17, 14–16, 14–19, 9–17

UENO COP Arena, Asunción

20 October 2025
19:00

Boxscore

Argentina	75–66	Uruguay
Scoring by quarter: 22–24, 23–12, 22–13, 8–17

UENO COP Arena, Asunción

21 October 2025
16:30

Boxscore

Brazil	57–67	Argentina
Scoring by quarter: 21–24, 18–8, 8–15, 10–20

UENO COP Arena, Asunción

21 October 2025
19:00

Boxscore

Ecuador	60–59	Bolivia
Scoring by quarter: 13–17, 23–18, 14–10, 10–14

UENO COP Arena, Asunción

22 October 2025
15:00

Boxscore

Uruguay	49–74	Brazil
Scoring by quarter: 12–17, 13–21, 14–17, 10–19

UENO COP Arena, Asunción

22 October 2025
17:30

Boxscore

Argentina	65–35	Ecuador
Scoring by quarter: 11–4, 23–15, 12–5, 19–11

UENO COP Arena, Asunción

23 October 2025
12:30

Boxscore

Ecuador	55–68	Uruguay
Scoring by quarter: 11–13, 12–20, 7–15, 25–20

UENO COP Arena, Asunción

23 October 2025
15:00

Boxscore

Bolivia	41–83	Argentina
Scoring by quarter: 10–12, 13–28, 11–21, 7–22

UENO COP Arena, Asunción

24 October 2025
12:30

Boxscore

Brazil	62–33	Ecuador
Scoring by quarter: 17–5, 7–7, 20–5, 18–16

UENO COP Arena, Asunción

24 October 2025
15:00

Boxscore

Uruguay	66–56	Bolivia
Scoring by quarter: 18–14, 11–14, 23–10, 14–18

UENO COP Arena, Asunción

=== Group B ===
Pos	Team	Pld	W	L	PF	PA	PD	Pts	Qualification
1	Venezuela	3	3	0	170	160	+10	6	Semifinals
2	Paraguay (H)	3	2	1	193	180	+13	5	Semifinals
3	Colombia	3	1	2	157	160	−3	4	5th–8th place playoffs
4	Chile	3	0	3	159	179	−20	3	5th–8th place playoffs

Source: FIBA
(H) Hosts

22 October 2025
12:30

Boxscore

Venezuela	58–54	Chile
Scoring by quarter: 12–17, 15–18, 15–10, 16–9

UENO COP Arena, Asunción

22 October 2025
20:00

Boxscore

Paraguay	65–58	Colombia
Scoring by quarter: 22–17, 16–19, 19–14, 8–8

UENO COP Arena, Asunción

23 October 2025
17:30

Boxscore

Colombia	46–47	Venezuela
Scoring by quarter: 10–6, 15–14, 12–12, 9–15

UENO COP Arena, Asunción

23 October 2025
20:00

Boxscore

Chile	57–68	Paraguay
Scoring by quarter: 15–10, 14–22, 19–18, 9–18

UENO COP Arena, Asunción

24 October 2025
17:30

Boxscore

Chile	48–53	Colombia
Scoring by quarter: 11–13, 15–16, 16–11, 6–13

UENO COP Arena, Asunción

24 October 2025
20:00

Boxscore

Paraguay	60–65	Venezuela
Scoring by quarter: 20–16, 11–15, 12–18, 17–16

UENO COP Arena, Asunción

== 5th–8th place playoffs ==
5th–8th place semifinals
A3	Uruguay	62
B4	Chile	64
B3	Colombia	67
A4	Ecuador	38

5th place match
Chile	52
Colombia	63
7th place match
Uruguay	49
Ecuador	53

=== 5th–8th place semifinals ===
25 October 2025
12:30

Boxscore

Uruguay	62–64	Chile
Scoring by quarter: 13–25, 24–15, 18–12, 7–12

UENO COP Arena, Asunción

25 October 2025
15:00

Boxscore

Colombia	67–38	Ecuador
Scoring by quarter: 18–11, 10–11, 13–8, 26–8

UENO COP Arena, Asunción

=== 7th place match ===
26 October 2025
12:30

Boxscore

Uruguay	49–53	Ecuador
Scoring by quarter: 12–20, 17–18, 6–6, 14–9

UENO COP Arena, Asunción

=== 5th place match ===
26 October 2025
15:00

Boxscore

Chile	52–63	Colombia
Scoring by quarter: 8–13, 4–14, 25–16, 15–20

UENO COP Arena, Asunción

== Championship playoffs ==
Semifinals
A1	Argentina	71
B2	Paraguay	47
B1	Venezuela	67
A2	Brazil	52

Final
Argentina	67
Venezuela	46
3rd place match
Paraguay	49
Brazil	43

=== Semifinals ===
25 October 2025
17:30

Boxscore

Venezuela	67–52	Brazil
Scoring by quarter: 7–13, 26–12, 10–6, 24–21

UENO COP Arena, Asunción

25 October 2025
20:00

Boxscore

Argentina	71–47	Paraguay
Scoring by quarter: 17–14, 26–13, 7–13, 21–7

UENO COP Arena, Asunción

=== 3rd place match ===
26 October 2025
17:30

Boxscore

Paraguay	49–43	Brazil
Scoring by quarter: 15–16, 12–16, 10–5, 12–6

UENO COP Arena, Asunción

=== Final ===
26 October 2025
20:00

Boxscore

Argentina	67–46	Venezuela
Scoring by quarter: 28–6, 22–15, 7–9, 10–16

UENO COP Arena, Asunción

== Final standings ==
Rank	Team
1st place, gold medalist(s)	Argentina
2nd place, silver medalist(s)	Venezuela
3rd place, bronze medalist(s)	Paraguay
4	Brazil
5	Colombia
6	Chile
7	Ecuador
8	Uruguay
9	Bolivia

Qualified for the 2026 FIBA U18 Women's AmeriCup
