= Paraguay women's national under-17 and under-18 basketball team =

Paraguay
- FIBA zone: FIBA Americas
- National federation: Confederación Paraguaya de Basquetbol

U19 World Cup
- Appearances: None

U18 AmeriCup
- Appearances: 2
- Medals: None

U17 South American Championship
- Appearances: 13
- Medals: (silver) Silver: 1 (1976); (bronze) Bronze: 3 (2002, 2005, 2025)

The Paraguay women's national under-17 and under-18 basketball team is a national basketball team of Paraguay, administered by the Confederación Paraguaya de Basquetbol. It represents the country in international under-17 and under-18 women's basketball competitions.

== FIBA U17 Women's South American Championship participations ==
| Year | Result |
|---|---|
| 1976 | 2nd place, silver medalist(s) |
| 1992 | 6th |
| 1996 | 7th |
| 2002 | 3rd place, bronze medalist(s) |
| 2004 | 6th |
| 2005 | 3rd place, bronze medalist(s) |
| 2009 | 6th |

| Year | Result |
|---|---|
| 2013 | 6th |
| 2015 | 4th |
| 2019 | 6th |
| 2022 | 9th |
| 2023 | 5th |
| 2025 | 3rd place, bronze medalist(s) |

== FIBA Under-18 Women's AmeriCup participations ==
| Year | Result |
|---|---|
| 2006 | 5th |
| 2026 | 6th |

== See also ==
- Paraguay women's national basketball team
- Paraguay women's national under-15 basketball team
- Paraguay men's national under-17 basketball team
