= 2026 FIBA U18 Women's AmeriCup =

15th FIBA Under-18 Women's Americas Basketball Championship

Tournament details
- Host country: Mexico
- City: Irapuato
- Dates: 9–15 June 2026
- Teams: 8 (from 1 confederation)
- Venue: 1 (in 1 host city)

Final positions
- Champions: United States (13th title)
- Runners-up: Canada
- Third place: Argentina
- Fourth place: Venezuela

Tournament statistics
- MVP: (United States) Jordyn Palmer
- Top scorer: (United States) Kaleena Smith (19.8)
- Top rebounds: (United States) Bella Flemings (9.2)
- Top assists: (Canada) Gabriela Morash (6.6)
- PPG (Team): United States (111.0)
- RPG (Team): United States (63.4)
- APG (Team): United States (27.8)

Official website
- www.fiba.basketball

The 2026 FIBA U18 Women's AmeriCup was the 15th edition of the FIBA Under-18 Women's AmeriCup, a biennial international under-18 women's basketball competition. The tournament was held from 9 to 15 June 2026 in Irapuato, Mexico. It also served as the FIBA Americas' qualifier for the 2027 FIBA Under-19 Women's Basketball World Cup, where the top four teams qualified.

== Participating teams ==
- North America:
1. United States
2. Canada
- Central America–Caribbean: (Top three CAC teams in the FIBA Girls' World Ranking)
1. Puerto Rico
2. Mexico (Hosts)
3. Dominican Republic
- South America: (2025 FIBA U17 Women's South American Championship in Asunción, Paraguay, 20–26 October 2025)
1. Argentina
2. Venezuela
3. Paraguay

== Preliminary round ==
The draw was held on 4 May 2026 in FIBA Americas Headquarters in Miami, Florida.

All times are local (Zona Centro; UTC-6).

=== Group A ===
Pos	Team	Pld	W	L	PF	PA	PD	Pts	Qualification
1	Canada	3	3	0	304	149	+155	6	Semifinals
2	Venezuela	3	2	1	224	229	−5	5	Quarterfinals
3	Dominican Republic	3	1	2	186	245	−59	4	Quarterfinals
4	Puerto Rico	3	0	3	177	268	−91	3	5th–8th place classification

Source: FIBA
Rules for classification: 1) Points; 2) Head-to-head results; 3) Points difference; 4) Points scored.

9 June 2026
12:30

Boxscore

Venezuela	77–60	Dominican Republic
Scoring by quarter: 20–13, 12–17, 14–15, 31–15
Pts: Astrid Inojosa 33; Rebs: Alexandra Cabeza 11; Asts: Astrid Inojosa 6		Pts: Nathaly Santana 17; Rebs: Alanna Monte 16; Asts: two players 3

Inforum, Irapuato
Attendance: 348
Referees: Franco Anselmo (ARG), Kara Hunter (USA), Sarah Mikaela Rodriguez Ferrari (HON)

9 June 2026
15:00

Boxscore

Canada	104–40	Puerto Rico
Scoring by quarter: 37–9, 30–13, 19–9, 18–9
Pts: Savannah Swords 17; Rebs: Eunicia Salgado 7 Asts: Gabriela Morash 8		Pts: Andrea Alamo 12; Rebs: Jaely De Leon 4 Asts: Nyasia Caban 3

Inforum, Irapuato
Attendance: 230
Referees: Larissa Sales (BRA), Mariajesus Rocio Gonzalez Chaparro (CHI), Edna Vanessa Angel Fierros (MEX)

10 June 2026
12:30

Boxscore

Dominican Republic	46–96	Canada
Scoring by quarter: 21–26, 12–19, 4–25, 9–26
Pts: Yarianna Torres 9 Rebs: Robmariel Medrano 7 Asts: Natalia Valdez 3		Pts: Savannah Swords 19; Rebs: Savannah Swords 9 Asts: Gabriela Morash 7

Inforum, Irapuato
Attendance: 250
Referees: Aline García (URU), Kara Hunter (USA), Edna Vanessa Angel Fierros (MEX)

10 June 2026
15:00

Boxscore

Puerto Rico	65–84	Venezuela
Scoring by quarter: 9–20, 22–21, 14–23, 20–20
Pts: Lucianna Parrotta 14; Rebs: Lucianna Parrotta 7 Asts: Lucianna Parrotta 4		Pts: Mezharith Beleño 28; Rebs: Greidysmar Camacaro 10; Asts: Albanys Ramirez 7

Inforum, Irapuato
Attendance: 250
Referees: Franco Anselmo (ARG), Mariajesus Rocio Gonzalez Chaparro (CHI), Mirian Moraes (BRA)

12 June 2026
15:00

Boxscore

Canada	104–63	Venezuela
Scoring by quarter: 24–10, 30–17, 27–24, 23–12
Pts: Jordyn Wheeler 23; Rebs: Brooke McLeod 15; Asts: Gabriela Morash 8		Pts: Astrid Inojosa 20; Rebs: Jeiselys Figueroa 7 Asts: Mezharith Beleno 4

Inforum, Irapuato
Attendance: 1,000
Referees: Aline García (URU), Kara Hunter (USA), Edna Angel Fierros (MEX)

12 June 2026
17:30

Boxscore

Dominican Republic	80–72	Puerto Rico
Scoring by quarter: 13–14, 31–18, 23–21, 13–19
Pts: Nathaly Santana 21; Rebs: Nathaly Santana 10; Asts: Chantal Lopez 4		Pts: Valeria Medina 17; Rebs: Luciana Parrotta 12; Asts: two players 4

Inforum, Irapuato
Attendance: 600
Referees: Mariajesus Rocio Gonzalez Chaparro (CHI), Franco Anselmo (ARG), Mirian Moraes (BRA)

=== Group B ===
Pos	Team	Pld	W	L	PF	PA	PD	Pts	Qualification
1	United States	3	3	0	361	141	+220	6	Semifinals
2	Argentina	3	2	1	202	201	+1	5	Quarterfinals
3	Mexico (H)	3	1	2	186	263	−77	4	Quarterfinals
4	Paraguay	3	0	3	146	290	−144	3	5th–8th place classification

Source: FIBA
Rules for classification: 1) Points; 2) Head-to-head results; 3) Points difference; 4) Points scored.
(H) Hosts

9 June 2026
17:30

Boxscore

Argentina	47–113	United States
Scoring by quarter: 9–28, 8–24, 18–30, 12–31
Pts: Santina Cherot 14; Rebs: Sol Lemesoff 7 Asts: Santina Cherot 2		Pts: Jordyn Palmer 16; Rebs: Bella Flemings 10; Asts: Kaleena Smith 9

Inforum, Irapuato
Attendance: 200
Referees: Aline García (URU), Mirian Moraes (BRA), Eduard Riañe (VEN)

9 June 2026
20:00

Boxscore

Mexico	83–67	Paraguay
Scoring by quarter: 17–22, 25–16, 19–17, 22–12
Pts: Jimena Velazquez 22; Rebs: Aislin Tamez 9 Asts: Jimena Velazquez 9		Pts: Giovana Gonzalez 16; Rebs: Sofia Gomez 8 Asts: Gilda Duarte 8

Inforum, Irapuato
Attendance: 1100
Referees: Fei Xiang (CAN), Carlos Pallares (COL), Francisco Javier de Leon Ortega (PUR)

10 June 2026
17:30

Boxscore

Paraguay	38–84	Argentina
Scoring by quarter: 11–23, 6–20, 1–17, 20–24
Pts: Maria Franco 7 Rebs: Agustina Fernandez 7 Asts: Micaela Giminez 2		Pts: two players 17; Rebs: Renata Scordo 10; Asts: three players 3

Inforum, Irapuato
Attendance: 300
Referees: Fei Xiang (CAN), Carlos Pallares (COL), Francisco Javier de Leon Ortega (PUR)

10 June 2026
20:00

Boxscore

United States	125–53	Mexico
Scoring by quarter: 38–8, 33–13, 28–15, 26–17
Pts: Kaleena Smith 30; Rebs: two players 11; Asts: GG Banks 9		Pts: Aislin Tamez 9 Rebs: Renata Palma 6 Asts: Jimena Velazquez 3

Inforum, Irapuato
Attendance: 1500
Referees: Sarah Mikaela Rodriguez Ferrari (HON), Larissa Sales (BRA), Eduard Riañe (VEN)

12 June 2026
12:30

Boxscore

Paraguay	41–123	United States
Scoring by quarter: 10–40, 12–23, 16–35, 3–25
Pts: two players 8 Rebs: Agustina Fernandez 5 Asts: Giovana Gonzalez 3		Pts: Jordyn Palmer 21; Rebs: Miciah Fusilier 13; Asts: Kaleena Smith 9

Inforum, Irapuato
Attendance: 265
Referees: Larissa Rodrigues (BRA), Sarah Mikaela Rodriguez Ferrari (HON), RIAÑE, Eduard Riañe (VEN)

12 June 2026
20:00

Boxscore

Argentina	71–50	Mexico
Scoring by quarter: 17–17, 15–14, 16–15, 23–4
Pts: Renata Scordo 24; Rebs: Matilda Campo 12; Asts: Sofia Novoa 5		Pts: Yania Valverde 13; Rebs: Aislin Tamez 8 Asts: Aislin Tamez 4

Inforum, Irapuato
Attendance: 800
Referees: Fei Xiang (CAN), Carlos Pallares (COL), Francisco Javier de Leon Ortega (PUR)

== Knockout stage ==
=== Bracket ===
Fifth place game
B4	Paraguay	61
B3	Mexico	68
Seventh place game
A3	Dominican Republic	55
A4	Puerto Rico	56

5th–8th place semifinals
B4	Paraguay	69
A3	Dominican Republic	64
A4	Puerto Rico	64
B3	Mexico	84

Quarterfinals
B2	Argentina	86
A3	Dominican Republic	51
A2	Venezuela	80
B3	Mexico	69

Semifinals
A1	Canada	64
B2	Argentina	52
B1	United States	104
A2	Venezuela	51

Final
A1	Canada	72
B1	United States	90
Third place game
B2	Argentina	73
A2	Venezuela	49

=== Quarterfinals ===
13 June 2026
17:30

Boxscore

Argentina	86–51	Dominican Republic
Scoring by quarter: 28–15, 13–10, 23-15, 22-11
Pts: Sofia Lombardero 25; Rebs: Isabella Roldan 13; Asts: Sofia Novoa 8		Pts: Nathaly Santana 14; Rebs: Dignora Duval 8 Asts: Yarianna Torres 3

Inforum, Irapuato
Referees: Aline García (URU), Kara Hunter (USA), Larissa Rodrigues (BRA)

13 June 2026
20:00

Boxscore

Venezuela	80–69	Mexico
Scoring by quarter: 28–20, 15–12, 17–9, 20–28

Inforum, Irapuato
Referees: Fei Xiang (CAN), Mariajesus Rocia Gonzalez Chaparro (CHI), Mirian Moraes (BRA)

=== 5th–8th place semifinals ===
14 June 2026
12:30

Boxscore

Paraguay	69–64	Dominican Republic
Scoring by quarter: 18–24, 19–14, 13–8, 19–18
Pts: Bethsaida Ferreira 14; Rebs: Bethsaida Ferreira 7 Asts: three players 3		Pts: Natalia Valdez 18; Rebs: Alanna Monte 13; Asts: Nathaly Santana 4

Inforum, Irapuato
Attendance: 100
Referees: Franco Anselmo (ARG), Alin García (URU), Eduard Riañe (VEN)

14 June 2026
15:00

Boxscore

Puerto Rico	64–84	Mexico
Scoring by quarter: 15–19, 15–22, 24–27, 10–16
Pts: Lucianna Parrotta 14; Rebs: Amhaya Hernandez 8 Asts: Valeria Muñoz 3		Pts: Aislin Tamez 20; Rebs: Aislin Tamez 11; Asts: Aislin Tamez 10

Inforum, Irapuato
Attendance: 1000
Referees: Carlos Pallares (COL), Fei Xiang (CAN), Larissa Rodrigues (BRA)

=== Semifinals ===
14 June 2026
17:30

Boxscore

Canada	64–52	Argentina
Scoring by quarter: 15–14, 15–15, 19–5, 15–18
Pts: Savannah Swords 15; Rebs: two players 8 Asts: Savannah Swords 7		Pts: Santina Cherot 15; Rebs: three players 5 Asts: two players 2

Inforum, Irapuato
Attendance: 250
Referees: Roberto Fernandez (CRC), Mariajesus Rocio Gonzalez Chaparro (CHI), Francisco Javier de Leon Ortega (PUR)

14 June 2026
20:00

Boxscore

United States	104–51	Venezuela
Scoring by quarter: 32–4, 31–17, 22–15, 19–15
Pts: two players 18; Rebs: Kelsi Andrews 10; Asts: Bella Flemings 5		Pts: Albanys Ramirez 13; Rebs: Albanys Ramirez 9 Asts: two players 2

Inforum, Irapuato
Attendance: 1000
Referees: Mirian Moraes (BRA), Edna Vanessa Angel Fierros (MEX), Sarah Mikaela Rodriguez Ferrari (HON)

=== Seventh place game ===
15 June 2026
12:30

Boxscore

Dominican Republic	55–56	Puerto Rico
Scoring by quarter: 21-20, 12-13, 10-10, 12-13
Pts: Nathaly Santana 21; Rebs: Nathaly Santana 14; Asts: two players 4		Pts: Andrea Alamo 16; Rebs: Amahya Hernandez 7 Asts: Amahya Hernandez 6

Inforum, Irapuato
Attendance: 100
Referees: Aline García (URU), Larissa Rodrigues (BRA), Eduard Riañe (VEN)

=== Fifth place game ===
15 June 2026
15:00

Boxscore

Paraguay	61–68 (OT)	Mexico
Scoring by quarter: 16–9, 7–16, 16–16, 18–16, Overtime: 4–11
Pts: Maria Franco 16; Rebs: two players 8 Asts: Karin Caceres 5		Pts: Jimena Velazquez 19; Rebs: Aislin Tamez 13; Asts: Jimena Velazquez 6

Inforum, Irapuato
Attendance: 289
Referees: Carlos Pallares (COL), Kara Hunter (USA), Sarah Mikaela Rodriguez Ferrari (HON)

=== Third place game ===
15 June 2026
17:30

Boxscore

Argentina	73–49	Venezuela
Scoring by quarter: 24-10, 13-13, 17-13, 19-13
Pts: Renata Scordo 20; Rebs: Renata Scordo 18; Asts: three players 2		Pts: Astrid Inojosa 15; Rebs: Mezharith Beleño 9 Asts: two players 3

Inforum, Irapuato
Attendance: 1000
Referees: Fei Xiang (CAN), Francisco Javier de Leon Ortega (PUR), Edna Vanessa Angel Fierros (MEX)

=== Final ===
15 June 2026
20:00

Boxscore

Canada	72–90	United States
Scoring by quarter: 21–24, 15–28, 20–17, 16–21
Pts: Brooke McLeod 15; Rebs: Savannah Swords 12; Asts: Gabriela Morash 9		Pts: Kaleena Smith 26; Rebs: Jordyn Palmer 13; Asts: GG Banks 9

Inforum, Irapuato
Attendance: 1500
Referees: Franco Anselmo (ARG), Mariajesus Rocia Gonzalez Chaparro (CHI), Mirian Moraes (BRA)

== Statistics and awards ==
=== Awards ===
2026 FIBA U18 Women's AmeriCup winners

United States
13th title

Most Valuable Player
(United States) Jordyn Palmer

All Tournament Team

- (Venezuela) Astrid Inojosa
- (Argentina) Sofia Lombardero
- (United States) Jordyn Palmer
- (United States) Kaleena Smith
- (Canada) Savannah Swords

== Final standings ==
Rank	Team	Record
1st place, gold medalist(s)	United States	5–0
2nd place, silver medalist(s)	Canada	4–1
3rd place, bronze medalist(s)	Argentina	4–2
4	Venezuela	3–3
5	Mexico	3–3
6	Paraguay	1–4
7	Puerto Rico	1–4
8	Dominican Republic	1–5

Qualified for the 2027 FIBA Under-19 Women's Basketball World Cup
