= Ecuador women's national under-17 and under-18 basketball team =

Ecuador
- FIBA zone: FIBA Americas
- National federation: Federación Ecuatoriana de Básquetbol

U19 World Cup
- Appearances: None

U18 AmeriCup
- Appearances: 1
- Medals: None

U17 South American Championship
- Appearances: 19
- Medals: (gold) Gold: 1 (2002); (bronze) Bronze: 1 (1990)

The Ecuador women's national under-17 and under-18 basketball team is a national basketball team of Ecuador, administered by the Federación Ecuatoriana de Básquetbol. It represents the country in international under-17 and under-18 women's basketball competitions.

== FIBA South America Under-17 Championship for Women participations ==
Year	Result
1976	4th
1986	5th
1987	4th
1990	3rd place, bronze medalist(s)
1996	4th
1998	8th
2000	6th
2002	1st place, gold medalist(s)
2005	8th
2007	4th

Year	Result
2009	4th
2011	5th
2013	4th
2015	5th
2017	5th
2019	4th
2022	5th
2023	6th
2025	7th

== FIBA Under-18 Women's AmeriCup participations ==
Year	Result
1996	8th

== See also ==
- Ecuador women's national basketball team
- Ecuador women's national under-15 and under-16 basketball team
- Ecuador men's national under-17 and under-18 basketball team
