= Brazil women's national under-19 basketball team =

Brazil
- FIBA zone: FIBA Americas
- National federation: Confederação Brasileira de Basketball

U19 World Cup
- Appearances: 12
- Medals: (bronze) Bronze: 1 (2011)

U18 AmeriCup
- Appearances: 13
- Medals: (gold) Gold: 2 (1992, 1996); (silver) Silver: 3 (1988, 2010, 2012); (bronze) Bronze: 3 (2000, 2008, 2016)

U17 South American Championship
- Appearances: 21
- Medals: (gold) Gold: 13 (1976, 1981, 1986, 1990, 1992, 1998, 2000, 2004, 2009, 2013, 2015, 2022, 2023); (silver) Silver: 5 (1987, 1995, 1996, 2005, 2019); (bronze) Bronze: 2 (2007, 2011)
Home	Away

The Brazil women's national under-17, under-18 and under-19 basketball team is a national basketball team of Brazil, administered by the Brazilian Basketball Confederation (Portuguese: Confederação Brasileira de Basketball), abbreviated as CBB. It represents the country in international under-17, under-18 and under-19 women's basketball competitions.

== Results ==
=== FIBA Under-19 Women's Basketball World Cup ===
Year	Result
1989	8th
1993	5th
1997	4th
2001	7th
2007	10th
2009	9th

Year	Result
2011	3rd place, bronze medalist(s)
2013	6th
2015	10th
2021	16th
2023	14th
2025	14th

=== FIBA Under-18 Women's AmeriCup ===
Year	Result
1988	2nd place, silver medalist(s)
1992	1st place, gold medalist(s)
1996	1st place, gold medalist(s)
2000	3rd place, bronze medalist(s)
2004	4th
2006	4th
2008	3rd place, bronze medalist(s)

Year	Result
2010	2nd place, silver medalist(s)
2012	2nd place, silver medalist(s)
2014	4th
2016	3rd place, bronze medalist(s)
2022	4th
2024	4th

=== FIBA South America Under-17 Championship for Women ===
Year	Result
1976	1st place, gold medalist(s)
1981	1st place, gold medalist(s)
1986	1st place, gold medalist(s)
1987	2nd place, silver medalist(s)
1990	1st place, gold medalist(s)
1992	1st place, gold medalist(s)
1995	2nd place, silver medalist(s)
1996	2nd place, silver medalist(s)
1998	1st place, gold medalist(s)
2000	1st place, gold medalist(s)
2004	1st place, gold medalist(s)

Year	Result
2005	2nd place, silver medalist(s)
2007	3rd place, bronze medalist(s)
2009	1st place, gold medalist(s)
2011	3rd place, bronze medalist(s)
2013	1st place, gold medalist(s)
2015	1st place, gold medalist(s)
2019	2nd place, silver medalist(s)
2022	1st place, gold medalist(s)
2023	1st place, gold medalist(s)
2025	4th

== See also ==
- Brazil women's national basketball team
- Brazil women's national under-17 basketball team
- Brazil men's national under-19 basketball team
