= 2023 FIBA U17 Women's South American Championship =

International basketball competition

Tournament details
- Host country: Colombia
- City: Bucaramanga
- Dates: 26 November – 2 December 2023
- Teams: 9 (from 1 confederation)
- Venue: 1 (in 1 host city)

Final positions
- Champions: Brazil (13th title)
- Runners-up: Colombia
- Third place: Argentina

Official website
- www.fiba.basketball

The 2023 FIBA U17 Women's South American Championship was the 22nd edition of the South American basketball championship for under-17 women's national teams. The tournament was played in Bucaramanga, Colombia, from 26 November to 2 December 2023.

== Participating teams ==
- Argentina
- Bolivia
- Brazil
- Chile
- Colombia
- Ecuador
- Paraguay
- Uruguay
- Venezuela

== First round ==
In the first round, the teams were drawn into two groups. The first two teams from each group advanced to the semifinals; the third and fourth teams advanced to the 5th–8th place playoffs; the fifth-placed team in Group A finished 9th overall.

All times are local (Colombia Time – UTC-5).

=== Group A ===
Pos	Team	Pld	W	L	PF	PA	PD	Pts	Qualification
1	Colombia (H)	4	4	0	263	204	+59	8	Semifinals
2	Venezuela	4	3	1	245	253	−8	7	Semifinals
3	Ecuador	4	2	2	236	213	+23	6	5th–8th place playoffs
4	Bolivia	4	1	3	246	287	−41	5	5th–8th place playoffs
5	Chile	4	0	4	234	267	−33	4	

Source: FIBA
(H) Hosts

26 November 2023
18:00

Boxscore

Ecuador	58–44	Chile
Scoring by quarter: 9–17, 17–7, 14–12, 18–8

Coliseo Bicentenario, Bucaramanga

26 November 2023
20:30

Boxscore

Colombia	77–59	Bolivia
Scoring by quarter: 14–27, 19–7, 18–12, 26–13

Coliseo Bicentenario, Bucaramanga

27 November 2023
18:00

Boxscore

Bolivia	51–72	Ecuador
Scoring by quarter: 14–22, 14–16, 13–17, 10–17

Coliseo Bicentenario, Bucaramanga

27 November 2023
20:30

Boxscore

Venezuela	38–60	Colombia
Scoring by quarter: 16–15, 7–11, 9–17, 6–17

Coliseo Bicentenario, Bucaramanga

28 November 2023
18:00

Boxscore

Chile	64–68	Bolivia
Scoring by quarter: 19–17, 14–20, 7–16, 24–15

Coliseo Bicentenario, Bucaramanga

28 November 2023
20:30

Boxscore

Ecuador	56–60	Venezuela
Scoring by quarter: 17–19, 12–7, 13–21, 14–13

Coliseo Bicentenario, Bucaramanga

29 November 2023
18:00

Boxscore

Venezuela	73–69	Chile
Scoring by quarter: 21–25, 16–18, 12–14, 24–12

Coliseo Bicentenario, Bucaramanga

29 November 2023
20:30

Boxscore

Colombia	58–50	Ecuador
Scoring by quarter: 19–14, 8–12, 19–13, 12–11

Coliseo Bicentenario, Bucaramanga

30 November 2023
18:00

Boxscore

Bolivia	68–74	Venezuela
Scoring by quarter: 9–13, 20–17, 13–26, 26–18

Coliseo Bicentenario, Bucaramanga

30 November 2023
20:30

Boxscore

Chile	57–68	Colombia
Scoring by quarter: 11–13, 15–11, 13–26, 18–18

Coliseo Bicentenario, Bucaramanga

=== Group B ===
Pos	Team	Pld	W	L	PF	PA	PD	Pts	Qualification
1	Brazil	3	3	0	224	173	+51	6	Semifinals
2	Argentina	3	2	1	235	159	+76	5	Semifinals
3	Paraguay	3	1	2	182	188	−6	4	5th–8th place playoffs
4	Uruguay	3	0	3	115	236	−121	3	5th–8th place playoffs

Source: FIBA

27 November 2023
13:00

Boxscore

Argentina	78–54	Paraguay
Scoring by quarter: 21–15, 20–8, 20–15, 17–16

Coliseo Bicentenario, Bucaramanga

27 November 2023
15:30

Boxscore

Brazil	73–51	Uruguay
Scoring by quarter: 16–11, 16–10, 18–21, 23–9

Coliseo Bicentenario, Bucaramanga

29 November 2023
13:00

Boxscore

Paraguay	55–76	Brazil
Scoring by quarter: 10–18, 16–20, 13–19, 16–19

Coliseo Bicentenario, Bucaramanga

29 November 2023
15:30

Boxscore

Uruguay	30–90	Argentina
Scoring by quarter: 6–22, 8–20, 4–23, 12–25

Coliseo Bicentenario, Bucaramanga

30 November 2023
13:00

Boxscore

Paraguay	73–34	Uruguay
Scoring by quarter: 17–7, 20–13, 15–7, 21–7

Coliseo Bicentenario, Bucaramanga

30 November 2023
15:30

Boxscore

Brazil	75–67	Argentina
Scoring by quarter: 17–20, 19–21, 25–12, 14–14

Coliseo Bicentenario, Bucaramanga

== 5th–8th place playoffs ==
5th–8th place semifinals
A3	Ecuador	78
B4	Uruguay	48
B3	Paraguay	78
A4	Bolivia	74

5th place match
A3	Ecuador	47
B3	Paraguay	59
7th place match
B4	Uruguay	52
A4	Bolivia	73

=== 5th–8th place semifinals ===
1 December 2023
13:00

Boxscore

Ecuador	78–48	Uruguay
Scoring by quarter: 19–4, 23–15, 21–14, 15–15

Coliseo Bicentenario, Bucaramanga

1 December 2023
15:30

Boxscore

Paraguay	78–74	Bolivia
Scoring by quarter: 27–9, 19–31, 20–19, 12–15

Coliseo Bicentenario, Bucaramanga

=== 7th place match ===
2 December 2023
13:00

Boxscore

Uruguay	52–73	Bolivia
Scoring by quarter: 10–14, 8–17, 15–21, 19–21

Coliseo Bicentenario, Bucaramanga

=== 5th place match ===
2 December 2023
15:30

Boxscore

Ecuador	47–59	Paraguay
Scoring by quarter: 14–11, 11–13, 13–23, 9–12

Coliseo Bicentenario, Bucaramanga

== Championship playoffs ==
Semifinals
A1	Colombia	64
B2	Argentina	54
A2	Venezuela	61
B1	Brazil	71

Final
A1	Colombia	55
B1	Brazil	65
3rd place match
B2	Argentina	79
A2	Venezuela	71

=== Semifinals ===
1 December 2023
18:00

Boxscore

Venezuela	61–71	Brazil
Scoring by quarter: 9–16, 19–18, 18–17, 15–20

Coliseo Bicentenario, Bucaramanga

1 December 2023
20:30

Boxscore

Colombia	64–54	Argentina
Scoring by quarter: 14–16, 22–18, 18–7, 10–13

Coliseo Bicentenario, Bucaramanga

=== 3rd place match ===
2 December 2023
18:00

Boxscore

Argentina	79–71	Venezuela
Scoring by quarter: 18–13, 16–19, 19–21, 26–18

Coliseo Bicentenario, Bucaramanga

=== Final ===
2 December 2023
20:30

Boxscore

Colombia	55–65	Brazil
Scoring by quarter: 16–15, 12–19, 21–10, 6–21

Coliseo Bicentenario, Bucaramanga

== Final standings ==
Rank	Team
1st place, gold medalist(s)	Brazil
2nd place, silver medalist(s)	Colombia
3rd place, bronze medalist(s)	Argentina
4	Venezuela
5	Paraguay
6	Ecuador
7	Bolivia
8	Uruguay
9	Chile

Qualified for the 2024 FIBA U18 Women's AmeriCup
