= Chile women's national under-19 basketball team =

Chile
- FIBA zone: FIBA Americas
- National federation: Federación de Basquetbol de Chile

U19 World Cup
- Appearances: 1
- Medals: None

U18 AmeriCup
- Appearances: 5
- Medals: None

U17 South American Championship
- Appearances: 18
- Medals: (silver) Silver: 2 (2002, 2009); (bronze) Bronze: 3 (1987, 2013, 2017)
Home	Away

The Chile women's national under-17, under-18 and under-19 basketball team is a national basketball team of Chile, administered by the Federación de Basquetbol de Chile. It represents the country in international under-17, under-18 and under-19 women's basketball competitions.

== FIBA South America Under-17 Championship for Women participations ==
Year	Result
1987	3rd place, bronze medalist(s)
1990	7th
1992	4th
1996	6th
1998	5th
2000	7th
2002	2nd place, silver medalist(s)
2005	4th
2007	5th

Year	Result
2009	2nd place, silver medalist(s)
2011	4th
2013	3rd place, bronze medalist(s)
2015	7th
2017	3rd place, bronze medalist(s)
2019	7th
2022	6th
2023	9th
2025	6th

== FIBA Under-18 Women's AmeriCup participations ==
Year	Result
1988	7th
2010	4th
2014	6th
2016	6th
2018	6th

== FIBA Under-19 Women's Basketball World Cup participations ==
Year	Result
2011	12th

== See also ==
- Chile women's national basketball team
- Chile women's national under-15 and under-16 basketball team
- Chile men's national under-17 and under-18 basketball team
