= Argentina women's national under-19 basketball team =

Argentina
- FIBA zone: FIBA Americas
- National federation: CAB

U19 World Cup
- Appearances: 10
- Medals: (bronze) Bronze (2009)

U18 AmeriCup
- Appearances: 14
- Medals: (bronze) Bronze (1996, 2006, 2012, 2014, 2018, 2022, 2024, 2026)

U17 South American Championship
- Appearances: 22
- Medals: (gold) Gold (1987, 1996, 2005, 2017, 2025); (silver) Silver (1990, 1992, 1998, 2000, 2004, 2007, 2011, 2013, 2022); (bronze) Bronze (1976, 1981, 1995, 2009, 2015, 2019, 2023)
Home	Away

The Argentina women's national under-17, under-18 and under-19 basketball team is a national basketball team of Argentina, administered by the Argentine Basketball Confederation. It represents the country in international under-17, under-18 and under-19 women's basketball competitions.

== Results ==
=== Under-19 World Cup ===
Year	Result
1997	9th
2007	14th
2009	3rd place, bronze medalist(s)
2011	13th
2013	14th
2015	15th

Year	Result
2019	12th
2021	15th
2023	16th
2025	15th
2027	Qualified

=== Under-18 AmeriCup ===
Year	Result
1988	5th
1992	6th
1996	3rd place, bronze medalist(s)
2000	4th
2004	5th
2006	3rd place, bronze medalist(s)
2008	4th

Year	Result
2010	5th
2012	3rd place, bronze medalist(s)
2014	3rd place, bronze medalist(s)
2018	3rd place, bronze medalist(s)
2022	3rd place, bronze medalist(s)
2024	3rd place, bronze medalist(s)
2026	3rd place, bronze medalist(s)

=== U17 South American Championship ===
Year	Result
1976	3rd place, bronze medalist(s)
1981	3rd place, bronze medalist(s)
1986	4th
1987	1st place, gold medalist(s)
1990	2nd place, silver medalist(s)
1992	2nd place, silver medalist(s)
1995	3rd place, bronze medalist(s)
1996	1st place, gold medalist(s)
1998	2nd place, silver medalist(s)
2000	2nd place, silver medalist(s)
2004	2nd place, silver medalist(s)

Year	Result
2005	1st place, gold medalist(s)
2007	2nd place, silver medalist(s)
2009	3rd place, bronze medalist(s)
2011	2nd place, silver medalist(s)
2013	2nd place, silver medalist(s)
2015	3rd place, bronze medalist(s)
2017	1st place, gold medalist(s)
2019	3rd place, bronze medalist(s)
2022	2nd place, silver medalist(s)
2023	3rd place, bronze medalist(s)
2025	1st place, gold medalist(s)

== See also ==
- Argentina women's national basketball team
- Argentina women's national under-17 basketball team
- Argentina men's national under-19 basketball team
