= Colombia women's national under-19 basketball team =

Columbian sports

Colombia
- FIBA zone: FIBA Americas
- National federation: Federación Colombiana de Baloncesto

U19 World Cup
- Appearances: 1
- Medals: None

U18 AmeriCup
- Appearances: 5
- Medals: None

U17 South American Championship
- Appearances: 15
- Medals: (gold) Gold: 3 (1995, 2011, 2019); (silver) Silver: 4 (1981, 1986, 2017, 2023); (bronze) Bronze: 3 (1992, 1996, 2022)
Home	Away

The Colombia women's national under-17, under-18 and under-19 basketball team is a national basketball team of Colombia, administered by the Federación Colombiana de Baloncesto. It represents the country in international under-17, under-18 and under-19 women's basketball competitions.

== FIBA South America Under-17 Championship for Women participations ==
Year	Result
1981	2nd place, silver medalist(s)
1986	2nd place, silver medalist(s)
1990	4th
1992	3rd place, bronze medalist(s)
1995	1st place, gold medalist(s)
1996	3rd place, bronze medalist(s)
1998	4th
2000	4th

Year	Result
2009	7th
2011	1st place, gold medalist(s)
2017	2nd place, silver medalist(s)
2019	1st place, gold medalist(s)
2022	3rd place, bronze medalist(s)
2023	2nd place, silver medalist(s)
2025	5th

== FIBA Under-18 Women's AmeriCup participations ==
Year	Result
1992	8th
2012	6th
2018	4th
2022	6th
2024	6th

== FIBA Under-19 Women's Basketball World Cup participations ==
Year	Result
2019	11th

== See also ==
- Colombia women's national basketball team
- Colombia women's national under-17 basketball team
- Colombia men's national under-19 basketball team
