= Venezuela women's national under-17 and under-18 basketball team =

Venezuela
- FIBA zone: FIBA Americas
- National federation: Federación Venezolana de Baloncesto

U19 World Cup
- Appearances: 1 (2027)

U18 AmeriCup
- Appearances: 4
- Medals: None

U17 South American Championship
- Appearances: 19
- Medals: (gold) Gold: 1 (2007); (silver) Silver: 2 (2015, 2025); (bronze) Bronze: 1 (2000)

The Venezuela women's national under-17, under-18 and under-19 basketball team is a national basketball team of Venezuela, administered by the Federación Venezolana de Baloncesto. It represents the country in international under-17, under-18 and under-19 women's basketball competitions.

The team qualified for the 2027 World Cup, marking the first time in history that Venezuelan women's basketball players have participated in the Basketball World Cup in any age category.

== FIBA South America Under-17 Championship for Women participations ==
Year	Result
1986	6th
1987	5th
1990	6th
1992	5th
1995	4th
1996	5th
1998	7th
2000	3rd place, bronze medalist(s)
2004	4th
2005	7th

Year	Result
2007	1st place, gold medalist(s)
2009	5th
2013	5th
2015	2nd place, silver medalist(s)
2017	4th
2019	8th
2022	8th
2023	4th
2025	2nd place, silver medalist(s)

== FIBA Under-18 Women's AmeriCup participations ==
Year	Result
2000	6th
2008	5th
2016	7th
2026	4th

== FIBA Under-19 Women's Basketball World Cup participations ==
Year	Result
2027	Qualified

== See also ==
- Venezuela women's national basketball team
- Venezuela women's national under-15 and under-16 basketball team
- Venezuela men's national under-19 basketball team
