= Cuba women's national under-19 basketball team =

Cuba
- FIBA zone: FIBA Americas
- National federation: Federación Cubana de Baloncesto

U19 World Cup
- Appearances: 4
- Medals: None

U18 AmeriCup
- Appearances: 4
- Medals: (silver) Silver: 1 (2000); (bronze) Bronze: 2 (1988, 1992)

U17 Centrobasket
- Appearances: None

The Cuba women's national under-18 and under-19 basketball team is a national basketball team of Cuba, administered by the Federación Cubana de Baloncesto. It represents the country in international under-18 and under-19 women's basketball competitions.

== FIBA Under-18 Women's AmeriCup participations ==
| Year | Result |
|---|---|
| 1988 | 3rd place, bronze medalist(s) |
| 1992 | 3rd place, bronze medalist(s) |
| 1996 | 4th |
| 2000 | 2nd place, silver medalist(s) |

== FIBA Under-19 Women's Basketball World Cup participations ==
| Year | Result |
|---|---|
| 1985 | 9th |
| 1989 | 10th |
| 1997 | 11th |
| 2001 | 6th |

== See also ==
- Cuba women's national basketball team
- Cuba women's national under-15 and under-16 basketball team
- Cuba men's national under-19 basketball team
