= 2022 FIBA U18 Women's South American Championship =

International basketball competition

Tournament details
- Host country: Argentina
- City: Buenos Aires
- Dates: 3–9 April 2022
- Teams: 9 (from 1 confederation)
- Venue: 1 (in 1 host city)

Final positions
- Champions: Brazil (12th title)
- Runners-up: Argentina
- Third place: Colombia

Official website
- www.fiba.basketball

The 2022 FIBA U18 Women's South American Championship was the 21st edition of the South American basketball championship for under-17/18 women's national teams. It was played at Estadio Obras Sanitarias in Buenos Aires, Argentina, from 3 to 9 April 2022. Brazil won the tournament for the 12th time.

The tournament was postponed by one year due to the Covid-19 pandemic. Also, the age category was increased from U17 to U18.

== Participating teams ==
- Argentina
- Bolivia
- Brazil
- Chile
- Colombia
- Ecuador
- Paraguay
- Uruguay
- Venezuela

== First round ==
In the first round, the teams were drawn into two groups. The first two teams from each group advanced to the semifinals; the third and fourth teams advanced to the 5th–8th place playoffs; the fifth-placed team in Group A finished 9th overall.

All times are local (Argentina Time – UTC-3).

=== Group A ===
Pos	Team	Pld	W	L	PF	PA	PD	Pts	Qualification
1	Brazil	4	4	0	274	192	+82	8	Semifinals
2	Argentina (H)	4	3	1	243	204	+39	7	Semifinals
3	Ecuador	4	2	2	203	225	−22	6	5th–8th place playoffs
4	Bolivia	4	1	3	247	255	−8	5	5th–8th place playoffs
5	Paraguay	4	0	4	201	292	−91	4	

Source: FIBA
(H) Hosts

3 April 2022
16:00

Report

Bolivia	59–78	Brazil
Scoring by quarter: 13–19, 13–24, 20–23, 13–12
Pts: Sarahi Velazco Terraga 12		Pts: Giovanna Rocha da Silva 25

Estadio Obras Sanitarias, Buenos Aires
Referees:
Aline García
Enzo Piero Fernández Valenzuela
Alejandra Guerrero Álvarez

3 April 2022
19:00

Report

Ecuador	44–58	Argentina
Scoring by quarter: 9–6, 10–19, 13–14, 12–19
Pts: María Sarmiento 16		Pts: Malena Maggi 12

Estadio Obras Sanitarias, Buenos Aires
Referees:
Carol Sacramento García Ferro
Vivian Elizabeth Garcia Otermin
Leinel Katiuska Pino Montes

4 April 2022
17:30

Report

Paraguay	57–64	Ecuador
Scoring by quarter: 13–11, 9–20, 13–20, 22–13
Pts: Antonella Luraghi 19		Pts: Maria Sarmiento 16

Estadio Obras Sanitarias, Buenos Aires
Referees:
Aline García
Carol Sacramento García Ferro
Leinel Katiuska Pino Montes

4 April 2022
20:30

Report

Argentina	66–56	Bolivia
Scoring by quarter: 14–13, 15–15, 20–12, 17–16
Pts: Angelina Giacone 24		Pts: Daniela Leaño Carrasco 16

Estadio Obras Sanitarias, Buenos Aires
Referees:
Enzo Piero Fernández Valenzuela
Vivian Elizabeth Garcia Otermin
Alejandra Guerrero Álvarez

5 April 2022
14:30

Report

Bolivia	92–57	Paraguay
Scoring by quarter: 26–13, 21–11, 22–19, 23–14
Pts: Florencia del Pilar Araoz Marquez 18		Pts: Agostina Ochipinti 12

Estadio Obras Sanitarias, Buenos Aires
Referees:
Carol Sacramento García Ferro
Vivian Elizabeth Garcia Otermin
Leinel Katiuska Pino Montes

5 April 2022
17:30

Report

Brazil	56–53	Argentina
Scoring by quarter: 6–13, 13–11, 17–14, 20–15
Pts: Ana Beatriz Passos Alves Da Silva 14		Pts: Alma Bourgarel 15

Estadio Obras Sanitarias, Buenos Aires
Referees:
Aline García
Enzo Piero Fernández Valenzuela
Alejandra Guerrero Álvarez

6 April 2022
17:30

Report

Paraguay	39–70	Brazil
Scoring by quarter: 2–24, 10–14, 10–16, 17–16
Pts: Pamela Encina 7		Pts: Arianny Francisco De Oliveira 18

Estadio Obras Sanitarias, Buenos Aires
Referees:
Carol Sacramento García Ferro
Vivian Elizabeth Garcia Otermin
Alejandra Guerrero Álvarez

6 April 2022
20:30

Report

Ecuador	54–40	Bolivia
Scoring by quarter: 14–11, 7–10, 18–13, 15–6
Pts: Maria Sarmiento 17		Pts: Mary Blanca Candia Carrion 13

Estadio Obras Sanitarias, Buenos Aires
Referees:
Aline García
Enzo Piero Fernández Valenzuela
Leinel Katiuska Pino Montes

7 April 2022
14:30

Report

Brazil	70–41	Ecuador
Scoring by quarter: 22–11, 11–6, 18–11, 19–13
Pts: Taissa Nascimento Queiroz 15		Pts: Emily Germania González Cañar 6

Estadio Obras Sanitarias, Buenos Aires
Referees:
Carol Sacramento García Ferro
Enzo Piero Fernández Valenzuela
Leinel Katiuska Pino Montes

7 April 2022
17:30

Report

Argentina	66–48	Paraguay
Scoring by quarter: 10–13, 10–11, 20–14, 26–10
Pts: Nerea Lagowski 15		Pts: Constanza Lopez 11

Estadio Obras Sanitarias, Buenos Aires
Referees:
Aline García
Vivian Elizabeth Garcia Otermin
Alejandra Guerrero Álvarez

=== Group B ===
Pos	Team	Pld	W	L	PF	PA	PD	Pts	Qualification
1	Colombia	3	3	0	193	156	+37	6	Semifinals
2	Uruguay	3	2	1	173	153	+20	5	Semifinals
3	Chile	3	1	2	173	176	−3	4	5th–8th place playoffs
4	Venezuela	3	0	3	144	198	−54	3	5th–8th place playoffs

Source: FIBA

4 April 2022
11:30

Report

Venezuela	53–73	Chile
Scoring by quarter: 18–18, 12–19, 10–18, 13–18
Pts: Fabiana Garcia 10		Pts: Betsabe Pizarro 21

Estadio Obras Sanitarias, Buenos Aires
Referees:
Micaela Prado
Maria Alejandra González Sanabria
Jassmany Milton Choque Galarza

4 April 2022
14:30

Report

Uruguay	57–61	Colombia
Scoring by quarter: 14–17, 8–13, 21–9, 4–8
Pts: Lucia Auza 21		Pts: Valeria Rodriguez Hernandez 20

Estadio Obras Sanitarias, Buenos Aires
Referees:
Romina Belén Morales Ibarra
Larissa Sales Rodrigues
Yazmin Alejandra Michilena Valenzuela

5 April 2022
11:30

Report

Chile	47–59	Uruguay
Scoring by quarter: 12–15, 12–23, 14–12, 9–9
Pts: Martina Orellana 15		Pts: Sofia Herrera 16

Estadio Obras Sanitarias, Buenos Aires
Referees:
Micaela Prado
Larissa Sales Rodrigues
Jassmany Milton Choque Galarza

6 April 2022
11:30

Report

Uruguay	57–45	Venezuela
Scoring by quarter: 17–9, 12–7, 16–7, 12–22
Pts: Lucia Auza 19		Pts: Romina Mudarra 13

Estadio Obras Sanitarias, Buenos Aires
Referees:
Romina Belén Morales Ibarra
Larissa Sales Rodrigues
Yazmin Alejandra Michilena Valenzuela

6 April 2022
14:30

Report

Chile	53–64	Colombia
Scoring by quarter: 14–9, 12–21, 11–11, 16–23
Pts: Vania Vega 19		Pts: Silvia Juliana Suarez Hurtado 17

Estadio Obras Sanitarias, Buenos Aires
Referees:
Micaela Prado
Maria Alejandra González Sanabria
Jassmany Milton Choque Galarza

7 April 2022
11:30

Report

Colombia	68–46	Venezuela
Scoring by quarter: 16–5, 18–16, 16–14, 18–11
Pts: Marta Paulina Moscarella Contreras 15		Pts: Eduglatriz Castro 19

Estadio Obras Sanitarias, Buenos Aires
Referees:
Micaela Prado
Larissa Sales Rodrigues
Yazmin Alejandra Michilena Valenzuela

== 5th–8th place playoffs ==
5th–8th place semifinals
A3	Ecuador	69
B4	Venezuela	37
B3	Chile	68
A4	Bolivia	60

5th place match
A3	Ecuador	59
B3	Chile	28
7th place match
B4	Venezuela	57
A4	Bolivia	68

=== 5th–8th place semifinals ===
8 April 2022
11:30

Report

Ecuador	69–37	Venezuela
Scoring by quarter: 11–12, 17–8, 12–15, 28–2
Pts: Aixa Iudlissa Benalcazar Carranza 16		Pts: Eduglatriz Castro 9

Estadio Obras Sanitarias, Buenos Aires
Referees:
Carol Sacramento García Ferro
Maria Alejandra González Sanabria
Vivian Elizabeth Garcia Otermin

8 April 2022
14:30

Report

Chile	68–60	Bolivia
Scoring by quarter: 20–13, 16–18, 20–10, 12–19
Pts: Gabriela Ahumada 28		Pts: Camila Fresia Prado 19

Estadio Obras Sanitarias, Buenos Aires
Referees:
Micaela Prado
Yazmin Alejandra Michilena Valenzuela
Leinel Katiuska Pino Montes

=== 7th place match ===
9 April 2022
11:30

Report

Venezuela	57–68	Bolivia
Scoring by quarter: 11–19, 18–11, 15–17, 13–21
Pts: Georgina Correia 15		Pts: Florencia del Pilar Araoz Marquez 18

Estadio Obras Sanitarias, Buenos Aires
Referees:
Carol Sacramento García Ferro
Vivian Elizabeth Garcia Otermin
Yazmin Alejandra Michilena Valenzuela

=== 5th place match ===
9 April 2022
14:30

Report

Ecuador	59–28	Chile
Scoring by quarter: 12–3, 7–11, 15–11, 25–3
Pts: Nahomy Jaili Nazareno Caicedo 10		Pts: Martina Orellana 11

Estadio Obras Sanitarias, Buenos Aires
Referees:
Romina Belén Morales Ibarra
Alejandra Guerrero Álvarez
Leinel Katiuska Pino Montes

== Championship playoffs ==
Semifinals
A1	Brazil	59
B2	Uruguay	47
A2	Argentina	60
B1	Colombia	41

Final
A1	Brazil	49
A2	Argentina	46
3rd place match
B2	Uruguay	43
B1	Colombia	60

=== Semifinals ===
8 April 2022
17:30

Report

Brazil	59–47	Uruguay
Scoring by quarter: 19–19, 14–4, 15–11, 11–13
Pts: Stephany Gonçalves 14		Pts: Paula Fernandez 12

Estadio Obras Sanitarias, Buenos Aires
Referees:
Jassmany Milton Choque Galarza
Romina Belén Morales Ibarra
Alejandra Guerrero Álvarez

8 April 2022
20:30

Report

Argentina	60–41	Colombia
Scoring by quarter: 13–11, 22–14, 17–7, 8–9
Pts: Angelina Giacone 17		Pts: Maria Jose Salguedo Rincon 11

Estadio Obras Sanitarias, Buenos Aires
Referees:
Enzo Piero Fernández Valenzuela
Aline García
Larissa Sales Rodrigues

=== 3rd place match ===
9 April 2022
17:30

Report

Uruguay	43–60	Colombia
Scoring by quarter: 12–16, 15–7, 8–18, 8–19
Pts: Pierina Rossi 18		Pts: Juliana Gomez Esteban 15

Estadio Obras Sanitarias, Buenos Aires
Referees:
Micaela Prado
Larissa Sales Rodrigues
Maria Alejandra González Sanabria

=== Final ===
9 April 2022
20:30

Report

Brazil	49–46	Argentina
Scoring by quarter: 11–7, 8–12, 15–9, 15–18
Pts: Taissa Nascimento Queiroz 20		Pts: Alma Bourgarel 13

Estadio Obras Sanitarias, Buenos Aires
Referees:
Aline García
Enzo Piero Fernández Valenzuela
Jassmany Milton Choque Galarza

== Final standings ==
Rank	Team
1st place, gold medalist(s)	Brazil
2nd place, silver medalist(s)	Argentina
3rd place, bronze medalist(s)	Colombia
4	Uruguay
5	Ecuador
6	Chile
7	Bolivia
8	Venezuela
9	Paraguay

Qualified for the 2022 FIBA Under-18 Women's Americas Championship
