= 1997 FIBA Under-19 World Championship for Women =

1997 FIBA Under-19 Women's Basketball World Cup
Tournament details
- Host country: Brazil
- Dates: July 5–13
- Teams: 12 (from 5 federations)
- Venue: 1 (in 1 host city)

Final positions
- Champions: United States (1st title)

Tournament statistics
- Top scorer: (Japan) Miki (22.1)
- Top rebounds: (Cuba) Plutin (12.1)
- Top assists: (United States) Teasley (4.1)
- PPG (Team): (United States) (80.6)
- RPG (Team): (Russia) (41.3)
- APG (Team): (United States) (12.0)

The 1997 FIBA Under-19 World Championship for Women (Portuguese: Campeonato Mundial Feminino Sub-19 da Fiba 1997) took place in Brazil from 5 to 13 July 1997. It was co-organised by the International Basketball Federation (FIBA) and Brazilian Basketball Confederation.

Twelve national teams competed for the championship. United States came away with the Gold medal by defeating Australia 78–74 in the final.

== Venues ==
- Natal

== Competing nations ==
Except Brazil, which automatically qualified as the host nation, the 11 remaining countries qualified through their continents’ qualifying tournaments:

FIBA Africa (1)

- Mali

FIBA Asia (2)

- China
- Japan

FIBA Americas (4)

- Brazil (Host)
- Argentina
- Cuba
- United States

FIBA Oceania (1)

- Australia

FIBA Europe (4)

- Czech Republic
- Russia
- Slovakia
- Spain

== Preliminary round ==
Times given below are in UTC-03:00

=== Group A ===
Position	Team	Pld	W	L	PF	PA	PD	Pts	Tiebreak
1	Brazil	5	4	1	344	298	+46	9	1–0
2	Slovakia	5	4	1	336	277	+59	9	0–1
3	Czech Republic	5	3	2	308	277	+31	8	
4	China	5	2	3	327	311	+16	7	
5	Mali	5	1	4	216	321	−105	6	1–0
6	Argentina	5	1	4	276	323	−47	6	0–1

5 July 1997
10:00

Mali	37–60	Czech Republic

Natal

5 July 1997
14:00

Argentina	79–65	China

Natal

5 July 1997
19:15

Slovakia	73–75	Brazil

Natal

6 July 1997
11:30

China	66–37	Mali

Natal

6 July 1997
15:30

Czech Republic	59–63	Slovakia

Natal

6 July 1997
19:30

Brazil	73–48	Argentina

Natal

7 July 1997
12:00

Mali	56–48	Argentina

Natal

7 July 1997
16:00

Slovakia	60–55	China

Natal

7 July 1997
20:00

Czech Republic	53–61	Brazil

Natal

9 July 1997
12:00

Argentina	50–62	Slovakia

Natal

9 July 1997
16:00

China	65–69	Czech Republic

Natal

9 July 1997
20:00

Brazil	69–48	Mali

Natal

10 July 1997
12:00

Czech Republic	67–51	Argentina

Natal

10 July 1997
16:00

Slovakia	78–38	Mali

Natal

10 July 1997
20:00

China	76–66	Brazil

Natal

=== Group B ===
Position	Team	Pld	W	L	PF	PA	PD	Pts	Tiebreak
1	United States	5	4	1	393	335	+58	9	1–1 (+24)
2	Australia	5	4	1	380	300	+80	9	1–1 (+3)
3	Russia	5	4	1	351	343	+8	9	1–1 (−27)
4	Spain	5	2	3	284	287	−3	7	
5	Cuba	5	1	4	372	422	−50	6	
6	Japan	5	0	5	295	391	−96	5	

5 July 1997
12:00

Cuba	57–72	Spain

Natal

5 July 1997
16:00

United States	84–65	Japan

Natal

5 July 1997
21:00

Russia	66–63	Australia

Natal

6 July 1997
9:30

Japan	63–68	Cuba

Natal

6 July 1997
13:30

Spain	45–59	Russia

Natal

6 July 1997
17:30

Australia	80–74	United States

Natal

7 July 1997
10:00

Russia	76–58	Japan

Natal

7 July 1997
14:00

Spain	41–53	Australia

Natal

7 July 1997

Cuba	88–92	United States

Natal

9 July 1997
10:00

Australia	91–58	Cuba

Natal

9 July 1997
14:00

Japan	48–70	Spain

Natal

9 July 1997
18:00

United States	76–46	Russia

Natal

10 July 1997
10:00

Japan	61–93	Australia

Natal

10 July 1997
14:00

Spain	56–70	United States

Natal

10 July 1997
18:00

Russia	104–101	Cuba

Natal

== Knockout stage ==
=== Bracket ===
Semi-finals
12 July
United States	90
Slovakia	77
12 July
Brazil	60
Australia	71

First place
13 July
United States	78
Australia	74
Third place
13 July
Slovakia	45
Brazil	40

5th place bracket

Semi-finals
12 July
Russia	74
China	57
12 July
Czech Republic	57
Spain	54

Fifth place
13 July
Russia	68
Czech Republic	63
Seventh place
13 July
China	60
Spain	57

9th place bracket

Semi-finals
12 July
Cuba	59
Argentina	74
12 July
Mali	60
Japan	58

Ninth place
13 July
Argentina	70
Mali	60
Eleventh place
13 July
Cuba	67
Japan	63

=== Classification 9–12 ===
12 July 1997
10:00

Cuba	59–74	Argentina

Natal

12 July 1997
12:00

Mali	60–58	Japan

Natal

=== Classification 5–8 ===
12 July 1997
14:00

Russia	74–57	China

Natal

12 July 1997
16:00

Czech Republic	57–54	Spain

Natal

=== Semifinals ===
12 July 1997
18:00

Brazil	60–71	Australia

Natal

12 July 1997
20:00

United States	90–77	Slovakia

Natal

=== Eleventh place game ===
13 July 1997
9:30

Cuba	67–63	Japan

Natal

=== Ninth place game ===
13 July 1997
11:30

Argentina	70–60	Mali

Natal

=== Seventh place game ===
13 July 1997
13:30

China	60–57	Spain

Natal

=== Fifth place game ===
13 July 1997
15:30

Russia	68–63	Czech Republic

Natal

=== Third place game ===
13 July 1997
17:30

Slovakia	45–40	Brazil

Natal

=== Final ===
13 July 1997
19:30

United States	78–74	Australia

Natal

== Final standings ==
#	Team	W-L
	United States	6–1
	Australia	5–2
	Slovakia	5–2
4	Brazil	4–3
5	Russia	6–1
6	Czech Republic	4–3
7	China	3–4
8	Spain	2–5
9	Argentina	3–4
10	Mali	2–5
11	Cuba	2–5
12	Japan	0–7

== Awards ==
1997 FIBA Women's World Junior Championship winner

United States
First title
