= United States women's national under-19 basketball team =

United States
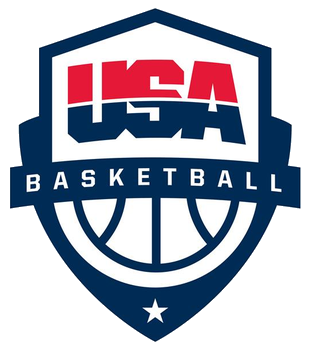
- FIBA ranking: 1st
- FIBA zone: FIBA Americas
- National federation: USA Basketball
- Coach: Suzie McConnell-Serio

FIBA Under-19 Women's World Cup
- Appearances: 16
- Medals: Gold: (1997, 2005, 2007, 2009, 2011, 2013, 2015, 2019, 2021, 2023, 2025); Silver: (2017); Bronze: (2001)

FIBA Under-18 Women's AmeriCup
- Appearances: 15
- Medals: Gold: (1988, 2000, 2004, 2006, 2008, 2010, 2012, 2014, 2016, 2018, 2022, 2024, 2026); Silver: (1992, 1996)
Medal record
FIBA Under-19 Women's World Cup
Gold medal – first place	1997 Brazil
Gold medal – first place	2005 Tunisia
Gold medal – first place	2007 Slovakia
Gold medal – first place	2009 Thailand
Gold medal – first place	2011 Chile
Gold medal – first place	2013 Lithuania
Gold medal – first place	2015 Russia
Gold medal – first place	2019 Thailand
Gold medal – first place	2021 Hungary
Gold medal – first place	2023 Spain
Gold medal – first place	2025 Czechia
Silver medal – second place	2017 Italy
Bronze medal – third place	2001 Czech Republic
FIBA Under-18 Women's AmeriCup
Gold medal – first place	1988 Brazil
Gold medal – first place	2000 Argentina
Gold medal – first place	2004 Puerto Rico
Gold medal – first place	2006 United States
Gold medal – first place	2008 Argentina
Gold medal – first place	2010 United States
Gold medal – first place	2012 Puerto Rico
Gold medal – first place	2014 United States
Gold medal – first place	2016 Chile
Gold medal – first place	2018 Mexico
Gold medal – first place	2022 Argentina
Gold medal – first place	2024 Colombia
Gold medal – first place	2026 Irapuato
Silver medal – second place	1992 Mexico
Silver medal – second place	1996 Mexico

The USA women's national under-19 basketball team is the women's basketball team, administered by USA Basketball, that represents the United States in international under-19 and under-18 (under age 19 and under age 18) women's basketball competitions, consisting mainly of the FIBA Americas Under-18 Championship for Women and FIBA Under-19 World Championship for Women. The events were originally referred to as the FIBA Americas Junior World Championship Qualifying Tournament and the FIBA Junior World Championship.

The usual sequence is for the U18 team to play in a regional championship in one year, with the top four qualifying teams being invited to the FIBA Under-19 World Championship in the following year, as the U19 team. The first Junior World Championship was held in 1985, without a qualifying tournament in the prior year. Starting in 1988, the events were on a four-year cycle, with the FIBA Americas Junior World Championship Qualifying Tournament in 1988, followed by the FIBA Junior World Championship in 1989. This continued until the format was changed in 2006. Now, the U18 team plays in the U18 Americas event every other year, and the U19 World event in subsequent years.

The U18 team becomes the U19 team, with largely the same players and coaches, although changes can occur. For example, while Debbie Ryan served as head coach for the 1988 U18 team, and again as head coach for the 1989 U19 team, the head coach for the 1992 U18 team was Nancy Wilson, but changed to Jim Foster for the 1993 U19 team. There are also changes in the playing roster, although many of the players on the U18 team go on to play on the U19 team.

== Competitive record ==
=== FIBA Under-19 Women's World Cup ===
Year	Result	Position	Pld	W	L	Ref
(United States) 1985	Fifth place	5th	6	4	2	
(Spain) 1989	Seventh place	7th	7	3	4	
(South Korea) 1993	Seventh place	7th	7	5	2	
(Brazil) 1997	Champions	1st	7	6	1	
(Czech Republic) 2001	Third place	3rd	7	6	1	
(Tunisia) 2005	Champions	1st	8	8	0	
(Slovakia) 2007	Champions	1st	9	9	0	
(Thailand) 2009	Champions	1st	9	8	1	
(Chile) 2011	Champions	1st	9	8	1	
(Lithuania) 2013	Champions	1st	9	9	0	
(Russia) 2015	Champions	1st	7	7	0	
(Italy) 2017	Runners-up	2nd	7	6	1	
(Thailand) 2019	Champions	1st	7	7	0	
(Hungary) 2021	Champions	1st	7	7	0	
(Spain) 2023	Champions	1st	7	7	0	
(Czech Republic) 2025	Champions	1st	7	7	0	
(China) 2027	Qualified					
Total	11 titles	16/17	120	107	13	—N/a

=== FIBA Under-18 Women's AmeriCup ===
Year	Result	Position	Pld	W	L	Ref
(Brazil) 1988	Champions	1st	6	6	0	
(Mexico) 1992	Runners-up	2nd	5	4	1	
(Mexico) 1996	Runners-up	2nd	5	4	1	
(Argentina) 2000	Champions	1st	5	5	0	
(Puerto Rico) 2004	Champions	1st	5	5	0	
(United States) 2006	Champions	1st	4	4	0	
(Argentina) 2008	Champions	1st	5	5	0	
(United States) 2010	Champions	1st	5	5	0	
(Puerto Rico) 2012	Champions	1st	5	5	0	
(United States) 2014	Champions	1st	5	5	0	
(Chile) 2016	Champions	1st	5	5	0	
(Mexico) 2018	Champions	1st	6	6	0	
(Argentina) 2022	Champions	1st	6	6	0	
(Colombia) 2024	Champions	1st	6	6	0	
(Mexico) 2026	Champions	1st	5	5	0	
Total	13 titles	15/15	78	76	2	—N/a

== 1993 ==
Jim Foster served as the head coach, with Rene Portland serving as an assistant coach at the FIBA Junior World Championship. The event was held in Seoul, South Korea August 1–8, 1993. The USA improved their record from the 1985 and 1989 events to 5–2, but that finish placed the team seventh overall.

== 1997 ==
In 1997, Portland became the head coach, with Marianna Freeman and Jim Lewis assistant coaches of the USA team competing in the Junior World Championship (now the U19 World Championship). That event was held in Natal, Brazil July 5–13, 1997. After beating Japan in the opening game, the USA played defending champion Australia in the second round. Despite having a 13-point lead at one time, the USA let the lead slip away and lost 80–74. However, the USA team then went on to win a four-point game against Cuba, and won easily against Russia and Spain to move to the medal rounds. In the semi-final the USA team faced Slovakia, and won 90–77 to move the team into their first ever finals for a FIBA Junior World team. The final was against Australia who had beaten the US in the second game. The USA team had a three-point lead with three seconds to go, but Australia hit a three-pointer to send the game to overtime. Australia scored first, the USA out scored the Australians 7–2 to take a small lead. The lead was down to two points with 30 seconds left in the game, but the USA hit free throws to win 78–74, notching the first ever gold medal for a Junior World Championship team from the USA.

== 2001 ==
Geno Auriemma was named as head coach, with Sherri Coale and Willette White assistant coaches of the USA team which would compete at the Junior World Championship in Brno, Czech Republic during July 2001. The team won their first five games, including a record setting win against Mali. The 97–27 final score represented the largest margin of victory by a USA team in Junior World Championship history. The preliminary round results qualified the team for the medal rounds, where they faced the host team, the Czech Republic. With a home crowd cheering them on, the Czech team held a nine-point lead with just over six minutes to go. The USA team cut the lead down to three points with seconds to go, and good defense gave the ball back to the USA. However, the USA was called for an offensive foul, and lost possession. The Czech Republic team won 92–88, and went on to beat Russia 82–80 to win the gold medal. The USA team beat Australia 77–72 to win the bronze medal. Diana Taurasi was the leading scorer for the US with 19.3 points per game, while Alana Beard was close behind with 18.0 points per game. Nicole Powell was the leading rebounder for the US, with seven rebounds per game.

== 2005 ==
Gail Goestenkors served as the head coach of the team representing the US at the 2005 FIBA Americas U19 Championship for Women in Tunis, Tunisia. Carol Ross and Felisha Legette-Jack served as assistant coaches. The USA team won all eight of their games, including the championship game against Serbia & Montenegro. Crystal Langhorne hit 77.5% of her field goal attempts, to lead the USA scorers with over 16 points per game. Candice Wiggins was close behind with almost 16 points per game. The USA team was dominant, winning every game by more than 20 points.

== 2006 U18 ==
The 2006, U18 competition was held in Colorado Springs, Colorado in June. The head coach was Doug Bruno, who was assisted by Jennifer Rizzotti and Carol Owens. The team emphasize defense, holding their opponent's to an average of about 51 points a game. The team won all four games, earning the gold-medal and a qualification for the 2007 U19 world championship. In the game against Paraguay, Tina Charles hit eight of her 10 field-goal attempts to set a tournament record while Khadijah Rushdan's nine assists in the game against Brazil was also a tournament record.

== 2007 U19 ==
The 2007, U19 competition was held in Bratislava, Slovakia in August. The head coach was Doug Bruno, who was assisted by Cynthia Cooper-Dyke and Carol Owens.

The USA team was dominant, winning all nine games at the event to earn the gold-medal. The margin of victory averaged almost 35 points, with only an eight-point victory in the first game against Spain in single digits. The USA reached the semi-finals unbeaten and faced Spain again, but this time led by 24 points from Maya Moore, the USA defeated Spain 69–46. The set up a match-up between the US and Sweden the only remaining undefeated teams. Five players for the USA scored double figures in the USA won the championship game 99–57.

== 2008 U18 ==
The U18 Americas Championship was held in July 2008. Players were eligible for the U18 and U19 teams in those years if they were born on January 1, 1990, or later. The USA won the gold, winning all five games. The result qualified the U19 team for the World Championships in July/August 2009 in Thailand, where the USA lost their opening game against Spain, but went on to win every subsequent game, including the gold medal rematch against Spain.

== 2009 USA U19 results ==
The 2009 competition was held in Bangkok, Thailand in August. The head coach was Carol Owens, who was assisted by Amanda Butler and Bill Fennelly.

In preparation for the tournament, the USA team played an exhibition game against France, and played a scrimmage with Australia. In the exhibition game, the USA team defeated France 86–46. In the opening game of the tournament, Spain defeated USA 90–86. After playing evenly for the first eight minutes, Spain pulled out to a 17-point lead in the first half, which the USA could only cut to 14 at halftime. In the second half the USA team tied the game at 58 all, then pulled to a 66–61 lead, but Spain tied the game again at 66, as part of a 21–1 run to take a commanding lead. The USA would fight back, but could not close the gap, losing by 4.

In the second game, USA defeated China 88–53, led by Nnemkadi Ogwumike with 18 points, and Kelsey Bone with 16. Kelsey Bone and Nnemkadi Ogwumike combined to score the first ten USA points, to help the USA jump out to a 10–2 lead. The game was never close again, with the USA winning 88–53. Skylar Diggins would score 13 points to join Bone and Ogwumike as double digit scorers. The USA would out rebound China 54–26 and held the Chinese team to under 30% shooting from the field. USA plays Mali July 25, 2009. In the following game, USA defeated Mali, 100–38, led by Kelly Faris with 13 points. Four other players had double digit scoring. Every available player scored, and the USA team held Mali to just over 20% shooting from the field. The USA team will have a day off Sunday, after the completion of the preliminary round and will return to action in the next round July 27, 2009.

After the day off, the USA defeated Canada 64–50. USA used an 11–0 run to take a commanding lead. Prahalis and Bone tied for the scoring lead with 14 points apiece; Ogwumike added a double-double with 11 points and 12 rebounds. In the following game, the USA team faced the undefeated team from Russia. The USA team led by six at the end of the first quarter, but, in the third quarter, Russia came back to retake the lead at 45–44. However, USA held Russia to 26% shooting from the field, and outrebounded 50–34 to earn the win. Russia had only 4 assists on 20 baskets, compared to eleven assists on 29 baskets for the Americans. The USA team won 75–56.

Then, the USA team defeated Japan 109–68, behind 15 points from Taber Spani, one of six players with double-digit scoring. The USA team shot 53% from beyond the three-point arc. Every player scored, every player played at least ten minutes and every player had at least one rebound. The USA used a 12–0 run early in the game to put themselves well ahead, and were never threatened again.

The USA team had beaten France in an unofficial exhibition game by 40 points eleven days earlier, but this game proved to be much different. France had a lead in much of the first half, as much as eight points at one time. The USA pulled ahead to a 14-point lead early in the second half, but France would pull to within two points early in the final period. The USA team then went on a 15–3 run to put the game out of reach, and won 88–75. Skyler Diggins and Nnemkadi Ogwumike each scored 16 points for the USA team. In the semi-final game, USA played Canada, after Canada beat Australia to reach the semi-final. The USA team held Canada to just over 30% shooting from the field, and won easily, 82–51. This win set up a replay with Spain, who beat the USA team in the opening match.

In the final game, a rematch with Spain, the USA team won 87–71 to win the gold. The USA team hit its first twelve shots, and were 15 for 18 in the first quarter, to open up a commanding lead. The USA would hit less than a third (19 of 59) of their field goals in the remainder of the game, but the opening quarter lead would prove sufficient. The USA held Spain to under 34% shooting for the game. The loss would be the first of the event for Spain.

== 2010 USA U18 results ==
The U18 competition was among teams in the Americas, and would determine which teams would be invited to the 2011 World Championships. Before the formal games started, the USA team played Canada in an exhibition game, winning 58–39. After starting out sluggishly, leading only 19–15 at the half, the team came together to outscore the Canadian team by 14 points in the second half. Chiney Ogwumike was the leading scorer with 155 points, and Bria Hartley had ten points, three assists and four steals.

In the first official game, the USA was matched up against Argentina. The USA team turned the ball over on each of their first three possessions, but then settled down and beat Argentina convincingly, 91–32. All USA players scored, while Bria Hartley, Kayla McBride, Chiney Ogwumike and Stefanie Dolson were all double-digit scorers. Head Coach Jennifer Rizzotti was pleased with the overall effort, other than the first minute of play. In the second game, the USA played the team from Brazil. Ogwumike again was the leading scorer with 15 points, all in the first half. Bria Hartley added 14 points, while Alexis Jones and Kayla McBride were also double-digit scorers. The USA team started out strong, with Hartley scoring eight points as part of a 13–2 run. The team was 15 of 17 from the free throw line, setting a USA FIBA Americas U18 Championship for Women record.

The next game was against Puerto Rico. The USA team was losing briefly, 3–2, before scoring 19 consecutive points to set the tone for the game. Diamond DeShields was the top scorer with 14 points, but seven other players were double-digit scorers. The team had 22 assists on their 35 baskets, as the team beat Puerto Rico 108–44. This win propelled the USA team into the semi-final match up against Chile. "The Beast of Twain" Ogwumike would again lead all scorers with 17, while Theresa Plaisance had 11 and Kayla McBride had 10. Reshanda Gray was the leading rebounder with 8. The game wasn't close after the opening minutes, with the USA team winning 98–28. This win set up the gold medal game, with a rematch against Brazil.

The USA team won the rematch with Brazil solidly, 81–38. Malina Howard, at sixteen years of age, was the second youngest on the team (only Diamond DeShields was younger), but led the entire tournament in field goal percentage, hitting 62.% of her attempts. Chiney Ogwumike led the USA team in scoring with 13.2 points per game, followed by Bria Hartley, with 10.6 per game. The head coach of the team was Jennifer Rizzotti of the University of Hartford.

== 2011 USA U19 results ==
After winning the gold in 2010, the USA team was one of the teams selected to play in the 2011 World's Championships. Prior to the formal start of the tournament, the USA team played an exhibition game against Brazil on June 5, 2011, winning the game 49–37. The team was finalized following the game, with twelve players identified to compete in the World Championships in Puerto Montt and Puerto Varas, Chile in July. The USA selection committee chose the team members to represent the USA. The twelve players selected were:

- Jordan Adams (Mater Dei H.S. / Irvine, Calif.)
- Cierra Burdick (Butler H.S. / Matthews, N.C.)
- Diamond DeShields (Norcross H.S. / Norcross, Ga.)
- Stefanie Dolson (Connecticut / Port Jervis, N.Y.)
- Bria Hartley (Connecticut / North Babylon, N.Y.)
- Alexis Jones (Irving MacArthur H.S. / Irving, Texas)
- Ariel Massengale (Bolingbrook H.S. / Bolingbrook, Ill.)
- Kaleena Mosqueda-Lewis (Mater Dei H.S. / Anaheim, Calif.)
- Imani Stafford (Winward H.S. / Los Angeles, Calif.)
- Breanna Stewart (Cicero-North Syracuse H.S. / North Syracuse, N.Y.)
- Morgan Tuck (Bolingbrook H.S. / Bolingbrook, Ill.)
- Elizabeth Williams (Princess Anne H.S. / Virginia Beach, Va.)

The opening game for the USA team was against Japan, who started out with a very early lead, 5–2. The USA team played with what head coach Jennifer Rizzotti called. "a lot of intensity". USA's Bria Hartley tied the game with a three-pointer, and the USA team went on a 20–2 run to take a large lead 22–7. However, Japan came back, and cut the lead to 27–22 in the second quarter. The lead was up to 17 points at halftime, but Japan took advantage of a "defensive lapse" in the second half, and cut the lead to eight points. The margin was still within single digits in the fourth quarter, when the USA team concentrated on defense, and went on a 10–3 run, leading to a final score of 85–63. Bria Hartley was the leading scorer with 18 points. Breanna Stewart had a double-double, with 13 points and 13 rebounds. Ariel Massengale was the assists leader, with five. The USA team shot 54% from the field, and held the Japanese team to a 28% shooting percentage. In the next game against Russia, the USA team never trailed, playing with better defensive intensity, according to Coach Rizzotti. The scoring started slowly, with the score tied at six apiece more than six minutes into the game. The USA team then went on a 12–1 run, and never relinquished the lead, finishing with a 76–53 win. Diamond DeShields was the top scorer for the USA team, with 16 points. The USA team held the Russian team to 26% shooting.

The third game typically determines which teams make it to the medal round, but that wasn't the case in this game. The Argentine team had been mathematically eliminated, and the USA team was certain to move on, win or lose. However, both teams played to win, and Argentina took an early lead 7–3. However, a balanced offense proved too much for the Argentine team. With eleven of the twelve USA players scoring between five and twelve points, led by Breanna Stewart on 3–3 shooting from the field, the USA team had too much offense and defense. The USA team held the opposition to under 30% shooting for the third consecutive game, allowing the Argentine team only a 27% shooting percentage. The USA team won the game 83–49, advancing them to the second round.

The USA team faced its toughest test to date in their match-up against China. The USA squad began the fourth quarter with a 12-point lead, but the team from China went on to score 31 points in the period. They started the period with a 12–2 run, cutting the lead to two points. It remained close, and was a tie game at 72 points apiece with 1:26 left to play. Kaleena Mosqueda-Lewis hit a three-pointer, one of five she hit during the game. After a score by China, Bria Hartley hit the three to extend the lead to four points. China responded with a three-pointer, cutting the lead back to a single point. With a half a minute to go in the game, Hartley passed underneath to Stefanie Dolson, who scored the final points of the game. China tried to tie the score with a three-pointer, but aggressive defense by Elizabeth Williams forced China to take an off-balance shot. Hartley rebounded the miss, and the USA team finished with an 80–77 win. Kaleena Mosqueda-Lewis led all scorers with 19 points, followed closely by Bria Hartley with 18. Stefanie Dolson had 12 points and eight rebounds, while Elizabeth Williams had a game-high nine rebounds. China shot 50% from beyond the arc, hitting 11 of their 22 three-point attempts.

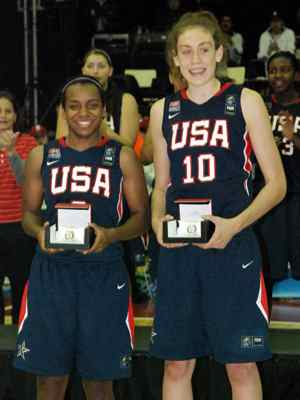
Ariel Massengale and Breanna Stewart, two of the five member named to the five-member All-FIBA U19 World Championship Team

In the next game, against Italy, the USA team started off strong, opening up a 31–13 lead early. Coach Rizzotti was happy with the team's intensity, that led to a 90–64 win over Italy. Cierra Burdick shot 5–7 from the field and hit 8 of 9 free throws to lead the team in scoring with 17 points. Her nine rebounds were a team high. The USA team shot well overall, hitting 55% of their shots. The USA team outrebounded their opponents 44–22. This win set up a match-up between the USA team and Canada, each coming into the game with spotless (5–0) records. Canada jumped out to an early 6–0 lead. Although the USA team closed the gap to 8–6, Canada extended the lead to double digits. The USA team was plagued by poor shooting, hitting only a third of their shots in the game, and ending up only marginally better, at 36%. Canada started out shooting well, over 60% in the first quarter, but would end up with a lower shooting percentage than the US at 35%. However, turnovers would be a key measure, as the USA team turned the ball over 24 times, the most of any game they played so far, leading to more shooting opportunities for the team from Canada. Ariel Massengale was the only USA player to score in double digits with 17 points. In contrast, Canada had three double-digit scorers, led by 24 points for Michelle Plouffe. Canada won the game 64–52. Both teams were still in medal contention.

The following game was against the team from France. The USA team started out slowly, hitting only one of their first six shots at the basket. France pulled out to a 14–5 early lead, hitting two-thirds of their shot attempts in the first quarter, and extended the lead to a 13-point margin during the first half. The USA team came back, but was still down 30–25 at halftime. The USA team cut into the lead in the third quarter, but with one quarter to go, France led 49–47. Kaleena Mosqueda-Lewis, who would score nine of her thirteen points in the final quarter, helped the USA take the lead, and the USA team pulled out to an eleven-point lead with just over six minutes to play. However, France hit consecutive three-pointers as part of a 9–0 run to bring the margin down to two points. With just over a minute to play, the score was even at 64 points apiece. Bria Hartley passed to Breanna Stewart, who was fouled going for the basket. She sank both free throws. After a turnover by France, Kaleena Mosqueda-Lewis scored with 23 seconds to go to give the USA a four-point lead. France did not score again, and the USA won the game 70–64.

The USA opponent in the semi-final game was Brazil. Each team had a single loss, with the USA losing to Canada, and Brazil losing to France. The teams traded leads early on, then Brazil moved out to a four-point margin 13–9. Bria Hartley hit back-to-back three-point attempts to put the USA back in a lead. Hartley ended up scoring 20 points in the first half, helping the team to a thirteen-point halftime lead. Brazil cut the lead to five points in the second half, but the USA built the lead back to double digits, was never seriously threatened again, and won the game 82–66. Hartley was the team's leading scorer with her 20 first-half points, while Ariel Massengale led the team with nine assists. Breanna Stewart and Cierra Burdick had nine rebounds apiece.

The USA team faced Spain in the gold medal game. In the opening minutes, the lead changed several times, until the USA team went on a 14–3 run to open up a 25–12 lead just before the end of the first quarter. The USA team extended the lead to 15 points by halftime. The USA team did not have great shooting, with under 40% for the game, but defensively held Spain to under 30%. USA's Stefanie Dolson said "Last year was an experience of a lifetime because that was qualifying for here. Then winning the world championship gold medal is so surreal. Getting up there, getting the gold around your neck, it's a moment you'll never forget". Dolson was one of the three high-scorers for the game, with 15 points, sharing the honors with Kaleena Mosqueda-Lewis, and Elizabeth Williams. The all-tournament team included two members of the USA squad, Ariel Massengale and Breanna Stewart.

== 2012 U18 results ==
The 2012 FIBA Americas U18 Championship was held in Gurabo, Puerto Rico August 15–19, 2012. The USA squad underwent training at the Walt Disney World Resort in Orlando, Florida between 28 May and June 1, then re-assembled at the U.S. Olympic Training Center in Colorado Springs, Colorado from the fourth through the twelfth of August. The training schedules overlapped with the U17 team locations and schedules, so they played a scrimmage against each other on May 31, 2012. The U17 team led the U18 team for most of the game, but Breanna Stewart took over in the fourth quarter, and the U18 team prevailed 73–66. The team then traveled to Puerto Rico for the Americas Championship.

=== Preliminary round ===
The twelve qualifying teams are separated into two groups, with four teams in each group.

Group A

- Argentina
- Columbia
- Dominican Republic
- USA

Group B

- Brazil
- Canada
- Mexico
- Puerto Rico

The first five rounds are played as a round-robin, in which each team plays all three of the other teams in their group. The preliminary rounds were scheduled for 15—17 August.

The first USA opponent was the Dominican Republic. Although the score was close in the first quarter, with only a two-point margin by the US at the end of the first quarter, the USA team overcame first-game jitters and scored 31 consecutive points in the second quarter to take an insurmountable lead. Every team player scored at least five points, with game high scoring honors going to Morgan Tuck. Michaela Mabrey set a U18 record for the US with ten assists. The final score was 99–26.

The USA team faced Argentina in their second game. The USA team held Argentina to single digit scoring in each of the four-quarters, to keep the point total for their opponents to 28. Although the USA team shot only 37% for the game, they hit 44% of their three-point shots. Breanna Stewart, with 17 points, was one of three double digit scorers, along with Morgan Tuck and Michaela Mowbrey. Lexie Brown had six blocks. The final score in favor of the USA was 68–28.

The USA team faced Columbia in the third and final match of the preliminary round. Michaela Mabrey hit five of six three-point attempts to tie a USA U18 record for three-point field goal percentage, set by Candice Wiggins in 2004. The team shooting was better in this game, with the team hitting 55% of their field goal attempts. The USA team won 87–36, to finish undefeated in preliminary play, and secure the top seed in the next round.

=== Medal round ===
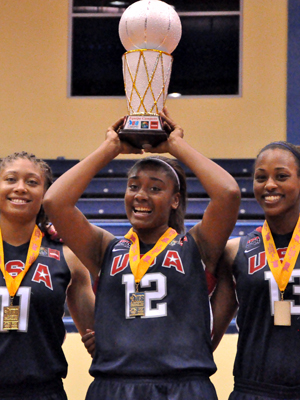
Morgan Tuck hoists the championship trophy at the award ceremonies in Gurabo, Puerto Rico

In their semi-final game, the USA team faced Canada. Although Canada managed an early 4–2 lead, the USA team quickly took over and led 24–8 at the end of the first quarter. Morgan Tuck hit nine of her 12 field goal attempts, leading to 22 points, while Breanna Stewart hit 8 of her 11 attempts, leading to 20 points. The USA won easily, 95–46, which puts the USA team in the gold medal game against undefeated Brazil.

The USA team had played 16 quarters leading to the gold medal game, and had not been out scored in any of them. That would change in the championship game. The team from Brazil scored the first six points, and held a 186–7 lead at the end of the first quarter. Brazil would score the opening two-point of the second period, but the USA team regained its bearings and took over the game. The USA team outscored Brazil 22–8 in the second period and 21–7 in the third to take a commanding lead. Four USA players scored in double digits, led by Morgan Tuck with 15. The final score of the championship was 71–47.

Breanna Stewart won the Tournament MVP award, while Morgan Tuck was the tournament's overall scoring leader at 17.8 points per game. The USA coach Katie Meier had praise for Stewart, Bashaara Graves, and Tuck, "Those three were workhorses down there".

== 2013 U19 results ==
The USA Basketball team invited 34 players to Colorado Springs for tryouts for the U19 team. Three coaches, Matt Corkery (American University), Bobbie Kelsey (Wisconsin) and Matilda Mossman (Tulsa) were chosen as court coaches to help the players on court at the tryouts and assist in the selection of the final team. The coaches who will travel with the team also participate in the training process. The head coach is Katie Meier (Miami), who will be assisted by Nikki Caldwell (Louisiana State University) and Kelly Graves (Gonzaga University). As a result of the tryout, the USA organization selected twelve players at the U19 World Championship in Klaipėda and Panevėžys, Lithuania as well as the preliminary event the Lanzarote International Invitational Title, held in the Canary Islands. The twelve players to represent the USA are:

- Candice Agee
- Nia Coffey
- Bashaara Graves
- Gabby Green
- Linnae Harper
- Moriah Jefferson
- Alexis Jones
- Kelsey Plum
- Breanna Stewart
- Morgan Tuck
- Brianna Turner
- A'ja Wilson

=== Lanzarote International Invitational Title ===
The opening game of the preliminary event was against Australia. The Aussies held a four-point lead at halftime 33–29, and extended the lead to seven points 40–33 part way through the third period. Morgan Tuck, who has scored only two points in the first half scored 11 of the USA's first 13 points in the second half to help cut into the lead, but at the beginning of the fourth quarter, the USA was still four points behind the Aussies. After swapping baskets, the USA scored twice to tie the game. Tuck scored a basket to give the USA the lead at 56–55, as part of an 8–2 run by the USA team. They extended the lead to seven points, and held on for the close 71–66 win.

In the second game, the USA team squared off against the host team, Spain. Unlike the previous game, the USA pulled out to an early lead and never relinquished it. Linnae Harper led all scorers with 15 points, en route to a 78–49 win by the USA. In the final game of the preliminary event, held July 14, the USA team opened up an early lead and held on to win 69–49 to capture the Lanzarote International Invitational title.

=== Lithuania preliminary rounds ===
The teams traveled from the Canary Islands to Lithuania for the remainder of the U19 championship. The USA team took on Lithuania in the first game of pool play in Group D. The other teams in Group D are China, with a 2–1 record in the preliminary round, and Mali who were 0–3 in the preliminary round. Lithuania was 1–2 in the preliminary round.

Four USA players scored in double digits in the game against Lithuania, including Nia Coffey with ten points, Bashaara Graves with 13 points and a tie for a team-high seven rebounds, Morgan Tuck with 18 points and a team high six assists. The leading scorer was Breanna Stewart, who played 20 minutes but scored 26 points. Stewart did not miss any of the six field goal attempts she took in the first quarter, and went on to score 19 points in the quarter. She ended 8 for 8 from the free throw line. The game was never close, with the USA up by 66 points at the end of the game, with a score of 112–47.

The USA team then faced China. The lead changed several times in the opening quarter, and the quarter ended with a five-point lead by the USA. China hit a three-pointer to open the second quarter, but then the USA team went on a 12–0 run to open up a larger lead. The USA held a 44–27 lead at the half. In the second half the USA put together a string of 17 consecutive points to give the USA a commanding lead. Six USA players scored in double digits, with Breanna Stewart scoring 20. A'ja Wilson had a double-double with 16 points and 10 rebounds, earning praise from head coach Katie Meier, who said, "A double-double in your second international game. That's very poised, very composed." The USA won the game 103–56. In the next game, the USA faced Mali. Although Mali held a very early 3–2 lead after the first minute, the game result was never in doubt, as the USA team scored 23 consecutive points and led 30–5 early. The team would go on win 103–26. The USA had advantages in experience as well as height, with a USA team averaging over six feet per player, while Mail averaged only five feet eight inches per player. Stewart again was the leading scorer with 17 points.

The USA entered the second round of preliminary play with a game against the Netherlands. The USA opened with a three-pointer, and never lost the lead. The team had two runs, one 8–0 and one 16–0 to open up large leads. The USA won, 102–42. The leading scorer was the youngest member of the team, Wilson, who had 20 points along with eight rebounds. Tuck, Jones, Graves and Stewart also scored in double digits.

The next game for the USA team was against Canada. The team from Canada scored first, and tied the game at three points apiece, but the USA opened up a lead they would never relinquish. In the second half, the USA opened up a 15-point lead, but Canada cut it back to ten, prompting a timeout. Shortly after, the USA team out together an 8–0 run to close the third quarter. The run continued in the fourth quarter when Stewart scored three consecutive goals, contributing to a run that extended to 19 points. Alexis Jones was the team's leading scorer, with 17 points.

The USA faced one of the other two remaining unbeaten teams, France, in their next match. France held a 15–11 lead late in the first quarter, when the USA scored the next eight points to take the lead. The USA extended the lead several times, but France fought back and kept the game close. The USA held a six-point lead at halftime. The third quarter was close, with the USA managing to outscore France by only two points in the period. Late in the game, the USA was up by twelve points, but France went on a 12–2 run, including six straight points to bring the margin back to two points with under a minute to play. Then Alexis Jones, who had missed all four of her three-point attempts, took another one and hit to give the USA five-point lead. France tried to respond with a three-point attempt of their own, but Jones blocked it to seal the win, and preserve the undefeated status of the USA. The USA team won 69–63 to advance to the quarterfinals.

=== Medal rounds ===
The USA played Japan in the quarterfinals. The USA had a height advantage, with USA's A'ja Wilson four inches taller than her counterpart. She took advantage of the mismatch, scoring a team high 19 points. The game was reasonable close in the opening minutes, with the USA leading 12–9, but the USA gradually extended the lead. At halftime, the score was 51–32. The USA used their height advantage on the boards, out-rebounding Japan 70–32, setting a new record for rebounds by a USA U19 team. The prior record of 68 was held by the 2007 squad. The final score was 108–67.

The semi-final match was against Australia, a team they had played in the Canary Islands as part of the Lanzarote International Invitational Title. The USA had won the game, but it was close up until the end of the game. In the semi-final game, the Aussies started strong. The score was tied on several occasions early, and the Australian team led the low-scoring game 20–17 with six minutes to go in the half. Then Breanna Stewart took over, scoring nine consecutive points herself to start a 21–0 run to end the half. At that time, the USA had pushed to a 28–20 lead. The Aussies did not quit, and played close to even in the third period, but they did not make up any ground. The final period was also close, with the USA team slightly outscoring the Aussies, but by the end of the game, the lead was 13 points and the USA won 77–54.

The championship game was a rematch against France, a team the USA had played in the preliminary round, winning by just six points. France scored first, and a few minutes into the game, the score was tied at six points each. However, the USA then went on an 11–2 run to open up a double-digit lead. The game was roughly even from then until the end of the half, with France cutting into the lead slightly. The USA led at halftime 27–20. Earlier in the day, Spain held a 14-point halftime lead over Australia in the bronze medal game, but could not hold on to the lead, so no one was thinking that a seven-point lead was safe. The second half was all USA. The USA started on a 10–0 run, and would end up surrendering only eight points in the second half. France ended up shooting under 22% from the field, and the USA would go on to win the game and the gold medal by a score of 61–28. Stewart was the high scorer for the team with 16 points, and also set a U19 all-time record for scoring with 152 points, which put her ahead of Maya Moore, who scored 147 in 2007. Alexis Jones had 29 assists during the tournament, tying an all-time U18 record established by Ariel Massengale. Stewart was named the MVP of the tournament and named to the all-tournament team.

== 2014 U18 results ==
The 2014 FIBA Americas U18 Championship was held in Colorado Springs, Colorado from August 6–10.

The USA team's opening game was against Mexico. The USA team started strong and had an early 14–2 lead. Mexico scored the next five points, but late in the first period, the USA started an 18–0 run that continued into the second period. All USA players scored in a 104–55 win. The second game was against El Salvador. The team from El Salvador held an early lead, 5–2, but from then on the USA was the dominant team. Eight of the USA team players recorded double-digit points, while the team hit 68% of their field goal attempts. The USA went on to win easily, 118–50. Game 3 was against undefeated Canada. The team from Canada pulled out to a narrow 23–21 lead at the end of the first quarter. The USA team took the lead in the second quarter and gradually extended the lead, finishing the game with a score of 107–76 Napheesa Collier was the leading scorer, recording a double-double with 22 points and 10 rebounds. Briana Turner scored 21 points and set a U18 record, hitting nine of eleven free throw attempts. The win secured a spot in the semi-final game against Argentina.

The semi-final match was against Argentina. The game was never close. The USA team held Argentina to 8 points in the first and second periods, while scoring 30 and 26 respectively. While Argentina out scored the US in the third quarter, the game was largely decided by that point. The USA finished with a win, 97–51, to advance to the gold medal game. The gold medal game was a re-match with Canada. Although Canada scored first and stayed close for a few minutes, with a score at 10–8 halfway through the first period, the USA went on a 12–0 run to take command. Canada got the margin back to eleven at one point, but the USA team extended the lead to 18 points by halftime. The USA won the game and the gold medal by a score of 104–75. A'ja Wilson was the leading scorer with 25 points, and led all rebounders with 11.

== 2015 U19 results ==
The 2015 FIBA Under-19 World Championship for Women was held in Chekhov, Russia from July 8 to 26, 2015.

In the opening game of the preliminary rounds the USA faced Spain. Both Napheesa Collier and A'ja Wilson recorded double doubles, with Collier scoring 13 points and a game-high 14 rebounds, while Wilson recorded a game-high 18 points along with 10 rebounds. Their performances help the team when the opening game 72–57. The following day, the USA play China. Wilson again recorded a double double with 17 points and 10 rebounds. Collier also scored 17 points, while Azurá Stevens and Shakayla Thomas contributed 16 points and 11 points respectively. The USA won the game 88–62. While there is one game remaining in preliminary play, the USA has already locked up the number one seed in group B. After a day off, the USA faced Egypt in the final game of the preliminary rounds. The USA started out slowly and were down 7–6 early in the game. The USA got untracked in the second quarter outscoring Egypt 38–9, to take a commanding lead. They went on to win easily 104 – 41. Every player on the USA's squad scored, with double digit results for Moore, Thomas, Wilson, Cox and Stevens.

In the round of 16 the USA faced Argentina. The game was never close. The USA had a 28–4 lead at the end of the first quarter, and coasted to win 89–39 when to advance to the quarterfinals. Wilson was the leading scorer with 18 points while Collier, Moore and Stevens each scored 11 points. Moore and Gabbi Ortiz share the lead for assist with six piece. After a day off, the USA played Canada in the quarterfinals. The USA scored the first 11 points of the game, and led 28–5 at the end of the first quarter. Every player on the team scored with game-high honors going to Collier and Moore each with 12 points. Cox led the team in rebounds with 10. The USA won 93–45 to advance to the semi-final game.

The USA played Spain in the semi-finals, a team they had beaten earlier in preliminary play. Collier and Wilson each recorded a double double. Collier scored 24 points on 10 of 13 shooting from the field. Wilson had 20 points and led the team in rebounds with 16. The USA team lead throughout the game and ended up with the win 80–65. The win advanced the team to the finals against the host team Russia. The gold-medal game matched up undefeated Russia (6–0) versus the US, who were also undefeated (6–0). The Russians started off strong, and opened up an eight-point lead at 27–19 in the second quarter. They led through most of the second quarter but late in the second quarter Stevens scored to give the US a lead 35–34 and Wilson had back to back buckets as part of a 9–0 run to take a 39–34 lead at halftime. In the second half, the USA led most of the way but Russia kept the game close and was within a basket at 68–65. The USA then went on a 7–0 run to open up a 10-point lead with under three minutes to go. Russia scored five quick points to cut the lead but Collier scored and Russia was unable to come back. The USA won 78–70 to win the gold-medal for the event. Wilson scored 30 points to set a USA record for a U19 game. That performance helped her earn the MVP award for the event. She along with teammate Collier were named to the five player all-tournament squad.

== 2016 U18 results ==
The 2016 FIBA Americas U18 Championship was held in Valdivia, Chile July 13–17, 2016. In May 2016, the USA Basketball organization selected 30 players to attend Team Trials at the Olympic Training Center in Colorado Springs, Colorado. After three days of trials, twelve players were selected to represent the US at the Americas championship.

The twelve players representing the USA were:

- Jeannie Boehm
- Rellah Boothe
- Chennedy Carter
- Sidney Cooks
- Lauren Cox
- Dana Evans
- Tyasha Harris
- Ruthy Hebard
- Valerie Higgins
- Amber Ramirez
- Megan Walker
- Evina Westbrook

The team members returned to the training center in July to continue training for the competition, including scrimmages against the Japan Women's U24 National Team.

The opening game was against Guatemala. The USA team took advantage of a 7-inch average height differential to overpower the Guatemala team. The USA team scored the first 14 points of the game and cruised to an easy 117–32 victory. The second game, against Brazil, was much more competitive especially at the beginning. USA was down 8–2 in the early minutes. The game was tied at 13 points apiece when the USA went on a run to take a nine-point lead at the end of the first quarter. The second half started like the first with Brazil scoring the first six points of the half in cutting the lead to six points before the USA expanded the lead. While the USA only scored 20 points in the final quarter their defense held Brazil to 16, leading to a final score in favor the US, 80–59.

The USA had a relatively easy time in the final preliminary match against Venezuela, more than doubling up the score, and winning 110–52. That victory place them into the semi-finals against Puerto Rico, and the results were even more lopsided. The USA one easily 104–36. That set up the gold-medal game against Canada. The USA had only a three-point margin at the end of the first quarter extended that in the second quarter but put the game away in the third quarter when they outscored Canada 33–14. The final score the championship game was 109–62.

Lauren Cox from Flower Mound, Texas was named the tournament MVP.

== Coaches and results ==
Head coaches, assistant coaches and managers for the U18 and U19 teams, through 2016.

USA basketball Coaching Staff—U18 and U19 teams
First	Last	Team	Position	Coached at	Year	W–L	Results
Sue	Rojcewicz	U19	Assistant coach	University of San Francisco (CA)	1985	4–2	5th place
Marianne	Stanley	U19	Head coach	Old Dominion University (VA)	1985	4–2	5th place
Sharon	Fanning	U18	Assistant coach	University of Kentucky	1988	6–0	Gold
Linda	Hargrove	U18	Manager	Cowley County Community College	1988	6–0	Gold
Debbie	Ryan	U18	Head coach	University of Virginia	1988	6–0	Gold
Jim	Foster	U19	Assistant coach	St. Joseph's University (PA)	1989	3–4	7th place
Linda	Hargrove	U19	Assistant coach	Wichita State University (KS)	1989	3–4	7th place
Debbie	Ryan	U19	Head coach	University of Virginia	1989	3–4	7th place
Jane	Albright-Dieterle	U18	Assistant coach	Northern Illinois University	1992	4–1	Silver
Trish	Roberts	U18	Assistant coach	University of Michigan	1992	4–1	Silver
Nancy	Wilson	U18	Head coach	University of South Carolina	1992	4–1	Silver
Ceal	Barry	U19	Assistant coach	University of Colorado	1993	5–2	7th place
Jim	Foster	U19	Head coach	Vanderbilt University (TN)	1993	5–2	7th place
Rene	Portland	U19	Assistant coach	Penn State University (PA)	1993	5–2	7th place
Marianna	Freeman	U18	Assistant coach	Syracuse University	1996	4–1	Silver
Kay	James	U18	Assistant coach	University of Southern Mississippi	1996	4–1	Silver
Rene	Portland	U18	Head coach	Penn State University	1996	4–1	Silver
Marianna	Freeman	U19	Assistant coach	Syracuse University (NY)	1997	6–1	Gold
Jim	Lewis	U19	Assistant coach	George Mason University (VA)	1997	6–1	Gold
Rene	Portland	U19	Head coach	Penn State University (PA)	1997	6–1	Gold
Geno	Auriemma	U18	Head coach	University of Connecticut	2000	5–0	Gold
Ed	Baldwin	U18	Assistant coach	University of North Carolina-Charlotte	2000	5–0	Gold
Deb	Patterson	U18	Assistant coach	Kansas State University	2000	5–0	Gold
Geno	Auriemma	U19	Head coach	University of Connecticut	2001	6–1	Bronze
Sherri	Coale	U19	Assistant coach	University of Oklahoma	2001	6–1	Bronze
Willette	White	U19	Assistant coach	Northeastern University (MA)	2001	6–1	Bronze
Ceal	Barry	U18	Head coach	University of Colorado	2004	5–0	Gold
Lea	Henry	U18	Assistant coach	Georgia State University	2004	5–0	Gold
Carolyn	Peck	U18	Assistant coach	University of Florida	2004	5–0	Gold
Gail	Goestenkors	U19	Head coach	Duke University (NC)	2005	8–0	Gold
Felisha	Legette-Jack	U19	Assistant coach	Hofstra University (NY)	2005	8–0	Gold
Carol	Ross	U19	Assistant coach	University of Mississippi	2005	8–0	Gold
Doug	Bruno	U18	Head coach	DePaul University	2006	4–0	Gold
Carol	Owens	U18	Assistant coach	Northern Illinois University	2006	4–0	Gold
Jennifer	Rizzotti	U18	Assistant coach	University of Hartford	2006	4–0	Gold
Doug	Bruno	U19	Head coach	DePaul University (IL)	2007	9–0	Gold
Cynthia	Cooper-Dyke	U19	Assistant coach	Prairie View A&M University (TX)	2007	9–0	Gold
Carol	Owens	U19	Assistant coach	Northern Illinois University	2007	9–0	Gold
Bill	Fennelly	U18	Assistant coach	Iowa State University	2008	5–0	Gold
Terri	Mitchell	U18	Assistant coach	Marquette University	2008	5–0	Gold
Carol	Owens	U18	Head coach	Northern Illinois University	2008	5–0	Gold
Bill	Fennelly	U19	Assistant coach	Iowa State University	2009	8–1	Gold
Amanda	Butler	U19	Assistant coach	University of Florida	2009	8–1	Gold
Carol	Owens	U19	Head coach	Northern Illinois University	2009	8–1	Gold
Jennifer	Rizzotti	U18	Head coach	University of Hartford	2010	5–0	Gold
Sue	Semrau	U18	Assistant coach	Florida State University	2010	5–0	Gold
Joi	Williams	U18	Assistant coach	University of Central Florida	2010	5–0	Gold
Jennifer	Rizzotti	U19	Head coach	University of Hartford	2011	8–1	Gold
Sue	Semrau	U19	Assistant coach	Florida State University	2011	8–1	Gold
Joi	Williams	U19	Assistant coach	University of Central Florida	2011	8–1	Gold
Summer	McKeehan	U19	Athletic Trainer	Duke University (NC)	2011	8–1	Gold
Katie	Meier	U18	Head coach	University of Miami	2012	5–0	Gold
Nikki	Caldwell	U18	Assistant coach	Louisiana State University	2012	5–0	Gold
Kelly	Graves	U18	Assistant coach	Gonzaga University	2012	5–0	Gold
Katie	Meier	U19	Head coach	University of Miami	2013	9–0	Gold
Nikki	Caldwell	U19	Assistant coach	Louisiana State University	2013	9–0	Gold
Kelly	Graves	U19	Assistant coach	Gonzaga University	2013	9–0	Gold
Dawn	Staley	U18	Head coach	University of South Carolina	2014	5–0	Gold
Kim	Barnes Arico	U18	Assistant coach	University of Michigan	2014	5–0	Gold
Jeff	Walz	U18	Assistant coach	University of Louisville	2014	5–0	Gold
Dawn	Staley	U19	Head coach	University of South Carolina	2015	9–0	Gold
Jeff	Walz	U19	Assistant coach	University of Louisville	2015	9–0	Gold
Kim Barnes	Arico	U19	Assistant coach	University of Michigan	2015	9–0	Gold
Dave	Walden	U19	Physician	USA Basketball, Colorado Springs, Colorado	2015	9–0	Gold
Summer	McKeehan	U19	Trainer	Duke University	2015	9–0	Gold
Suzie	McConnell-Serio	U18	Head coach	University of Pittsburgh	2016	5–0	Gold
Kamie	Ethridge	U18	Assistant coach	Northern Colorado University	2016	5–0	Gold
Charlotte	Smith	U18	Assistant coach	Elon University	2016	5–0	Gold
Ed	Ryan	U18	Athletic Trainer	USA Basketball, Colorado Springs, Colorado	2016	5–0	Gold
Jeff	Walz	U19	Head Coach	University of Louisville	2017	6–1	Silver
Natasha	Adair	U19	Assistant Coach	University of Delaware	2017	6–1	Silver
Cori	Close	U19	Assistant Coach	UCLA	2017	6–1	Silver
Jeff	Walz	U18	Head Coach	University of Louisville	2018	6–0	Gold
Natasha	Adair	U18	Assistant Coach	University of Delaware	2018	6–0	Gold
Cori	Close	U18	Assistant Coach	UCLA	2018	6–0	Gold
Jeff	Walz	U19	Head Coach	University of Louisville	2019	7–0	Gold
Natasha	Adair	U19	Assistant Coach	University of Delaware	2019	7–0	Gold
Cori	Close	U19	Assistant Coach	UCLA	2019	7–0	Gold
Cori	Close	U19	Head Coach	UCLA	2021	7–0	Gold
Aaron	Johnston	U19	Assistant Coach	South Dakota State University	2021	7–0	Gold
Joni	Taylor	U19	Assistant Coach	University of Georgia	2021	7–0	Gold
Joni	Taylor	U18	Head Coach	Texas A&M University	2022	6–0	Gold
Teri	Moren	U18	Assistant Coach	Indiana University	2022	6–0	Gold
Delisha	Milton-Jones	U18	Assistant Coach	Old Dominion University	2022	6–0	Gold
Joni	Taylor	U19	Head Coach	University of Georgia	2023	7–0	Gold
Delisha	Milton-Jones	U19	Assistant Coach	Old Dominion University	2023	7–0	Gold
Teri	Moren	U19	Assistant Coach	Indiana University	2023	7–0	Gold
Teri	Moren	U18	Head Coach	Indiana University	2024	6–0	Gold
Jose	Fernandez	U18	Assistant Coach	University of South Florida	2024	6–0	Gold
Niele	Ivey	U18	Assistant Coach	University of Notre Dame	2024	6–0	Gold

== Players ==
Players participating on U18 and U19 teams, 1985 through 2024.

USA basketball Players—U18 and U19 teams
First	Last	Team	Year	Played at
Jordan	Adams	U19	2011	Mater Dei H.S.
Candice	Agee	U19	2013	Penn State
Candice	Agee	U18	2014	Silverado H.S.
Bella	Alarie	U19	2017	Princeton
Jolene	Anderson	U19	2005	Wisconsin
Kristine	Anigwe	U19	2015	Desert Vista High School
Nicky	Anosike	U19	2005	Tennessee
Jayne	Appel	U18	2006	Stanford
Erika	Arriaran	U18	2004	Norco H.S. (CA)
Erika	Arriaran	U19	2005	Norco H.S.
Ariel	Atkins	U18	2014	Duncanville H.S.
Angela	Aycock	U18	1992	Kansas
Angela	Aycock	U19	1993	Kansas
LaSondra	Barrett	U19	2009	Louisiana State
Ashley	Battle	U18	2000	Linsly H.S. (WV)
Victoria	Baugh	U18	2006	Sacramento H.S. (CA)
Victoria	Baugh	U19	2007	Sacramento H.S.
Alana	Beard	U18	2000	Southwood H.S. (LA)
Alana	Beard	U19	2001	Duke
Sydney	Beasley	U19	1985	James Madison
Francesca	Belibi	U19	2019	Regit Jesuit H.S.
Lauren	Betts	U19	2021	Grandview H.S.
Sienna	Betts	U18	2024	Grandview H.S.
Tera	Bjorklund	U19	2001	Colorado
Angie	Bjorklund	U19	2007	University H.S.
Aijha	Blackwell	U18	2018	Whitfield School
Jeannie	Boehm	U18	2016	New Trier H.S.
Jeannie	Boehm	U19	2017	Hrvard
Mae Ola	Bolton	U19	1985	Auburn
Kelsey	Bone	U18	2008	Dulles H.S. (TX)
Kelsey	Bone	U19	2009	Dulles H.S. / #South Carolina
Madison	Booker	U19	2023	Germantown H.S. (MS) /Texas
Rellah	Boothe	U18	2016	IMG Academy
Sarah	Boothe	U18	2008	Warren Township H.S. (IL)
Barbara	Bootz	U19	1985	Georgia
Aliyah	Boston	U19	2019	Worcester Academy (MA)
Isuneh	Brady	U18	2022	Cathedral Catholic H.S.
Alyssia	Brewer	U18	2008	Sapulpa H.S. (OK)
Cameron	Brink	U19	2019	Southridge H.S.
Juana	Brown	U18	1996	Harding Academy (TN)
Keisha	Brown	U18	1996	Woodward Academy (GA)
Jenna	Brown	U18	2018	The Lovett School
Juana	Brown	U19	1997	Harding Academy
Lexie	Brown	U18	2012	North Gwinnett H.S.
Paige	Bueckers	U19	2019	Hopkins H.S.
Cierra	Burdick	U19	2011	Butler H.S. / #Tennessee
Kelley	Cain	U18	2006	St. Pius X H.S. (GA)
Desiree	Caldwell	U18	2018	Byron P. Steele II H.S.
Receé	Caldwell	U18	2014	Homeschooled
Chennedy	Carter	U18	2016	Timberview H.S.
Chennedy	Carter	U19	2017	Timberview H.S.
Essence	Carson	U18	2004	Paterson Eastside H.S. (NJ)
Essence	Carson	U19	2005	Rutgers
Tamika	Catchings	U18	1996	Duncanville H.S. (TX)
Tamika	Catchings	U19	1997	Duncanville H. S.
Tina	Charles	U18	2006	Connecticut
Dana	Chatman	U18	1988	Louisiana State
Shameka	Christon	U19	2001	Arkansas
Sonia	Citron	U19	2021	The Ursuline School
Layshia	Clarendon	U19	2009	Cajon H.S. / #California
Kristen	Clement	U19	1997	Cardinal O'Hara H. S.
Nia	Coffey	U19	2013	Hopkins H.S./*Northwestern
Marissa	Coleman	U18	2004	St. John's at Prospect Hall (DC)
Marissa	Coleman	U19	2005	St. Johns College H.S.
Napheesa	Collier	U18	2014	Incarnate Word Academy
Napheesa	Collier	U19	2015	Incarnate Word Academy
Sidney	Cooks	U18	2016	Saint Joseph Catholic Academy
Kendall	Cooper	U18	2012	St. Anthony H.S.
Ashley	Corral	U18	2008	Prairie H.S. (WA)
Caitlin	Clark	U19	2019	Dowling Catholic H.S.
Caitlin	Clark	U19	2021	Iowa
Lauren	Cox	U19	2015	Flower Mound High School
Lauren	Cox	U18	2016	Flower Mound High School
Breya	Cunningham	U19	2023	La Jolla County Day School/Arizona
Mara	Cunningham	U19	1993	Vanderbilt
Monique	Currie	U19	2001	The Bullis School
Crystal	Dangerfield	U19	2015	Blackman High School
Crystal	Dangerfield	U19	2017	Connecticut
Maori	Davenport	U18	2018	Charles Henderson H.S.
Jasmine	Davidson	U18	2024	Clackamas H.S.
Amari	DeBerry	U19	2021	Williamsville South H.S.
Karen	Deden	U18	1988	Washington
Karen	Deden	U19	1989	Washington
Allyssa	DeHaan	U19	2007	Michigan State
Aalyah	Del Rosario	U18	2022	The Webb School (Bell Buckle)
Diamond	DeShields	U18	2010	Norcross H.S.
Diamond	DeShields	U19	2011	Norcross H.S.
Skylar	Diggins	U18	2008	Washington H.S. (IN)
Skylar	Diggins	U19	2009	Washington H.S. / #Notre Dame
Stefanie	Dolson	U18	2010	Minisink Valley H.S./Connecticut
Stefanie	Dolson	U19	2011	Connecticut
Jadyn	Donovan	U19	2023	Sidwell Friends School/Duke
Kris	Durham	U18	1988	Tennessee
Joyce	Edwards	U19	2023	Camden H.S.
Joyce	Edwards	U18	2024	Camden H.S.
Queen	Egbo	U19	2019	Baylor
Kyra	Elzy	U19	1997	Tennessee
Dana	Evans	U18	2016	West Side Leadership Academy
Kelly	Faris	U18	2008	Heritage Christian (IN)
Kelly	Faris	U19	2009	Heritage Christian H.S. / #Conn.
Sania	Feagin	U19	2021	Forest Park H.S.
Stacey	Ford	U18	1988	Georgia
Madison	Francis	U18	2024	Lancaster Central H.S.
Azzi	Fudd	U19	2021	St. Johns College H.S. (D.C.)
Stephanie	Garner	U19	1985	Old Dominion
Nikitta	Gartrell	U18	2006	North Carolina State
Kailyn	Gilbert	U18	2022	IMG Academy
Stefanie	Gilbreath	U18	2006	Cinco Rancho H.S. (TX)
Bashaara	Graves	U18	2012	Clarksville H.S.
Bashaara	Graves	U19	2013	Tennessee
Reshanda	Gray	U18	2010	Washington Prep H.S.
Allisha	Gray	U18	2012	Washington County H.S
Gabby	Green	U19	2013	St. Mary's College H.S.
Vicki	Hall	U18	1988	Brebeuf Prep (IN)
Chavonne	Hammond	U18	1996	Arundel H.S. (MD)
Stacy	Hansmeyer	U18	1996	Norman H.S. (OK)
Cassie	Harberts	U18	2010	San Clemente H.S./USC
LeJuana	Hardmon	U19	1989	Georgia
Laura	Harper	U18	2004	Cheltenham H.S. (PA)
Linnae	Harper	U19	2013	Whitney Young H.S./*Kentucky
Tyasha	Harris	U18	2016	Heritage Christian
Tyasha	Harris	U19	2017	South Carolina
Bria	Hartley	U18	2010	North Babylon H.S./Connecticut
Bria	Hartley	U19	2011	Connecticut
Dena	Head	U19	1989	Tennessee
Ruthy	Hebard	U18	2016	West Valley H.S.
Ruthy	Hebard	U19	2017	Oregon
Kayeigh	Heckel	U18	2024	Long Island Lutheran H.S.
Rachel	Hemmer	U19	1993	Stanford
Sonja	Henning	U18	1988	Stanford
Sonja	Henning	U19	1989	Stanford
Hannah	Hidalgo	U19	2023	Paul VI/Notre Dame
Valerie	Higgins	U18	2016	Chaminade College Prep
Naz	Hillmon-Baker	U18	2018	Gilmour Academy
Naz	Hillmon-Baker	U19	2019	Michigan
Ebony	Hoffman	U18	2000	Narbonne H.S. (CA)
Carla	Holmes	U19	1989	Maryland
Joyner	Holmes	U19	2017	Oregon
Chardé	Houston	U18	2004	San Diego H.S. (CA)
Malina	Howard	U18	2010	Twinsburg H.S.
Rhyne	Howard	U18	2018	Bradley Central H.S.
Rhyne	Howard	U19	2019	Kentucky
Floretta	Jackson	U19	1985	James Madison
Tamicha	Jackson	U19	1997	Louisiana Tech
Amy	Jaeschke	U19	2007	New Trier H.S.
Moriah	Jefferson	U18	2012	Texas Home Educators Sports Association
Moriah	Jefferson	U19	2013	Connecticut
Ashley	Joens	U18	2018	Iowa City H.S.
Ashley	Joens	U19	2019	Iowa State
Dana	Johnson	U18	1992	Tennessee
Dana	Johnson	U19	1993	Tennessee
Diamond	Johnson	U19	2021	NC State
Niesa	Johnson	U18	1992	Alabama
Niesa	Johnson	U19	1993	Alabama
Shenise	Johnson	U19	2009	Miami (FL)
Zakiyah	Johnson	U18	2024	Sacred Heart H.S.
Alisha	Jones	U19	1985	Louisiana State
Curtycine	Jones	U19	1985	Texas
Chandi	Jones	U18	2000	Bay City H.S. (TX)
Alexis	Jones	U18	2010	MacArthur H.S.
Alexis	Jones	U19	2011	Irving MacArthur H.S.
Londynn	Jones	U18	2022	Corona Centennial H.S.
Londynn	Jones	U19	2023	UCLA
Alexis	Jones	U19	2013	Duke
MaChelle	Joseph	U19	1989	Purdue
Paris	Kea	U18	2014	Page H.S.
Lynetta	Kizer	U18	2008	Potomac H.S. (VA)
Laurie	Koehn	U18	2000	Moundridge H.S. (KS)
Chloe	Kitts	U18	2022	Faith Christian Academy
Chloe	Kitts	U19	2023	South Carolina
Betnijah	Laney	U19	2011	Smyrna H.S. / #Rutgers
Crystal	Langhorne	U19	2005	Maryland
Erlana	Larkins	U18	2004	North Palm Beach H.S. (FL)
Erlana	Larkins	U19	2005	North Carolina
Jantel	Lavender	U18	2006	Cleveland Central Catholic H.S.
Jantel	Lavender	U19	2007	Cleveland Central Catholic H.S.
Melissa	Lechlitner	U19	2007	Notre Dame
Jordan	Lee	U18	2024	St. Mary's of Stockton
Talana	Lepolo	U19	2023	Stanford
Lisa	Leslie	U19	1989	Morningside H. S.
Christine	Lesoravage	U18	1992	Virginia
Rebecca	Lobo	U18	1992	Connecticut
Rebecca	Lobo	U19	1993	Connecticut
Amy	Lofstedt	U19	1993	Virginia
Italee	Lucas	U18	2006	Centennial H.S. (NV)
Italee	Lucas	U19	2007	Centennial H.S.
Marina	Mabrey	U18	2014	Manasquan H.S.
Michaela	Mabrey	U18	2012	Manasquan H.S.
Katina	Mack	U19	1993	Penn State
Leah	Macy	U18	2024	Bethlehem H.S.
Ally	Malott	U18	2010	Madison H.S.
Michelle	Marciniak	U18	1992	Tennessee
Michelle	Marciniak	U19	1993	Tennessee
Dawn	Marsh	U19	1985	Tennessee
Maylana	Martin	U18	1996	Perris H.S. (CA)
Maylana	Martin	U19	1997	UCLA
Ariel	Massengale	U19	2011	Bolingbrook H.S. / #Tennessee
Etta	Maytubby	U18	1992	Oklahoma
Kayla	McBride	U18	2010	Villa Maria Academy/Notre Dame
Teaira	McCowan	U18	2014	Brenham H.S.
Alivia	McGill	U18	2024	Hopkins H.S.
Cotie	McMahon	U18	2022	Centerville H.S.
Cotie	McMahon	U19	2023	Ohio State
Diamond	Miller	U19	2019	Franklin H.S.
Beatrice	Mompremier	U18	2014	Miami H.S.
Penny	Moore	U19	1989	Long Beach State
Loree	Moore	U18	2000	Narbonne H.S. (CA)
Jessica	Moore	U19	2001	Connecticut
Loree	Moore	U19	2001	Narbonne H.S.
Mariya	Moore	U18	2014	Salesian H.S.
Mariya	Moore	U19	2015	Louisville
Maya	Moore	U18	2006	Collins Hill H.S. (GA)
Maya	Moore	U19	2007	Collins Hill H.S.
Carolyn	Moos	U18	1996	Blake H.S. (MN)
Carolyn	Moos	U19	1997	Blake H. S.
Kaleena	Mosqueda-Lewis	U19	2011	Mater Dei H.S. / #Connecticut
Jennifer	Mowe	U18	1996	Powers H.S. (OR)
Jennifer	Mowe	U19	1997	Oregon
Olivia	Nelson-Ododa	U18	2018	Winder-Barrow H.S.
S'Mya	Nichols	U18	2022	Shawnee Mission West H.S.
Indya	Nivar	U18	2022	Apex Friendship H.S.
Courtney	Ogden	U18	2022	The Westminster School
Nnemkadi	Ogwumike	U18	2008	Cy-Fair H.S. (TX)
Nnemkadi	Ogwumike	U19	2009	Stanford
Chiney	Ogwumike	U18	2010	Cy-Fair H.S./Stanford
Vickie	Orr	U19	1985	Auburn
Gabbi	Ortiz	U19	2015	Oklahoma
Kayla	Overbeck	U19	2017	Vanderbilt
Ali	Patberg	U19	2015	Columbus North H.S.
Te-Hina	Paopao	U19	2021	Oregon
Courtney	Paris	U18	2004	Piedmont H.S. (CA)
Courtney	Paris	U19	2005	Piedomnt H.S.
Candace	Parker	U18	2004	Naperville Central H.S. (IL)
Kari	Parriott	U18	1988	Oregon State
Kari	Parriott	U19	1989	Long Beach State
Kayla	Pedersen	U18	2006	Red Mountain H.S. (AZ)
Kayla	Pedersen	U19	2007	Red Mountain H.S.
Anaya	Peoples	U18	2018	Schlarman H.S.
Cassie	Peoples	U18	2010	Cy-Fair H.S./Texas
Vicky	Picott	U18	1988	Rutgers
Justine	Pissott	U18	2022	Red Bank Catholic H.S.
Theresa	Plaisance	U18	2010	Vandebilt Catholic H.S./LSU
Kelsey	Plum	U19	2013	La Jolla Country Day/*Washington
Cappie	Pondexter	U18	2000	Marshall H.S. (IL)
Cappie	Pondexter	U19	2001	John Marshall H.S.
Nicole	Powell	U18	2000	Mountain Pointe H.S. (AZ)
Nicole	Powell	U19	2001	Stanford
Samantha	Prahalis	U18	2008	Commack H.S. (NY)
Samantha	Prahalis	U19	2009	Ohio State
Lynn	Pride	U18	1996	Sam Houston H.S. (TX)
Lynn	Pride	U19	1997	Kansas
Alexis	Prince	U18	2012	Edgewater
Sedona	Prince	U18	2018	Liberty Hill H.S.
Amber	Ramirez	U18	2016	Karen Wagner H.S.
Semeka	Randall	U18	1996	Trinity H.S. (OH)
Semeka	Randall	U19	1997	Trinity H. S.
Brittainey	Raven	U18	2006	Texas
Kiki	Rice	U18	2022	Sidwell Friends School
Kiki	Rice	U19	2023	UCLA
Reili	Richardson	U19	2017	Arizona State
C'eira	Ricketts	U19	2009	Arkansas
Arianna	Roberson	U18	2024	Clark H.S.
Susan	Robinson	U19	1989	Penn State
Ashley	Robinson	U18	2000	South Grand Prairie H.S. (TX)
Angelica	Robinson	U18	2004	Marietta H.S. (GA)
Dawn	Royster	U19	1985	North Carolina
Khadijah	Rushdan	U18	2006	St. Elizabeth H.S. (DE)
Gert	Scott	U19	1985	Louisiana State
Patrina	Scruggs	U18	1988	Auburn
Chay	Shegog	U19	2009	North Carolina
Jessica	Shepard	U18	2014	Fremont H.S.
Meighan	Simmons	U19	2011	Tennessee
Destiny	Slocum	U19	2015	Mountain View H.S.
Charlotte	Smith	U18	1992	North Carolina
Katie	Smith	U19	1993	Ohio State
Kennedy	Smith	U18	2024	Etiwanda H.S.
NaLyssa	Smith	U18	2018	East Central H.S.
Taber	Spani	U19	2009	Metro Academy / #Tennessee
Jewel	Spear	U19	2021	Wake Forest
Nikki	Speed	U18	2008	Marlborough H.S. (CA)
Racquel	Spurlock	U19	1993	Louisiana Tech
Imani	Stafford	U19	2011	Winward H.S.
Imani	Stafford	U18	2012	Winward School
Dawn	Staley	U19	1989	Virginia
Stacy	Stephens	U19	2001	Texas
Azurá	Stevens	U19	2015	Duke
Trisha	Stevens	U18	1988	Stanford
Breanna	Stewart	U19	2011	Cicero-North Syracuse H.S. / *Conn.
Breanna	Stewart	U18	2012	Cicero-North H.S.
Breanna	Stewart	U19	2013	Connecticut
Jackie	Stiles	U18	1996	Claflin H.S. (KS)
Jackie	Stiles	U19	1997	Claflin H. S.
Shekinna	Stricklen	U18	2008	Morrilton H.S. (AR)
Sarah	Strong	U18	2024	Grace Academy
Ann	Strother	U19	2001	Highlands Ranch H.S.
Alecia	Sutton	U19	2017	Texas
Brittney	Sykes	U18	2012	University H.S.
Celeste	Taylor	U19	2019	Long Island Lutheran H.S.
Diana	Taurasi	U18	2000	Don Lugo H.S. (CA)
Diana	Taurasi	U19	2001	Connecticut
Nicole	Teasley	U18	1996	St. John's at Prosp. Hall (MD)
Nichole	Teasley	U19	1997	St. John's at Prospect Hall
Jasmine	Thomas	U19	2007	Oakton H.S.
Krystal	Thomas	U19	2007	The First Academy
Shakayla	Thomas	U19	2015	Florida State
Joslyn	Tinkle	U18	2008	Big Sky H.S. (MT)
Shauna	Tubbs	U18	1992	Trinity Valley C.C. (TX)
Morgan	Tuck	U19	2011	Bolingbrook H.S. / *Connecticut
Morgan	Tuck	U18	2012	Bolingbrook H.S.
Morgan	Tuck	U19	2013	Connecticut
Jannah	Tucker	U18	2012	New Town H.S.
Brianna	Turner	U19	2013	Manvel H.S.
Brianna	Turner	U18	2014	Manvel H.S.
Hailey	Van Lith	U19	2019	Cashmere H.S.
Grace	VanSlooten	U18	2022	IMG Academy
Grace	VanSlooten	U19	2023	Oregon
Payton	Verhulst	U19	2021	Louisville
Destinee	Walker	U18	2014	Lake Highland Prep School
Megan	Walker	U18	2016	Monacan H.S.
Megan	Walker	U19	2017	Monacan H.S.
Molly	Wampler	U18	1988	Colorado
Abby	Waner	U18	2004	Thunder Ridge H.S. (CA)
Abby	Waner	U19	2005	ThunderRidge H.S.
Lauren	Ware	U19	2021	Arizona
Evina	Westbrook	U18	2016	South Salem H.S.
Chatrice	White	U19	2015	Illinois
Wynter	Whitley	U19	2001	Holy Innocents' Episcopal
Candice	Wiggins	U18	2004	La Jolla Country Day (CA)
Candice	Wiggins	U19	2005	Stanford
Dana	Wilkerson	U18	1988	Long Beach State (CA)
Christyn	Williams	U18	2018	Central Arkansas Christian School
Christyn	Williams	U19	2017	Central Arkansas Christian School
Destiny	Williams	U19	2009	Benton Harbor H.S. / #Illinois
Elizabeth	Williams	U19	2011	Princess Anne H.S. / #Duke
Sara	Wilson	U18	1992	Oregon
A'ja	Wilson	U19	2013	Heathwood Hall H.S
A'ja	Wilson	U18	2014	Heathwood Hall H.S.
A'ja	Wilson	U19	2015	South Carolina
Yulonda	Wimbish	U19	1985	Texas
Christina	Wirth	U18	2004	Seton Catholic H.S. (AZ)
Christina	Wirth	U19	2005	Seton Catholic H.S.
Tiffany	Woosley	U18	1992	Tennessee
Tiffany	Woosley	U19	1993	Tennessee
Jersey	Wolfenbarger	U19	2021	Northside U.S.
Falisha	Wright	U18	1992	San Diego State (CA)
Monica	Wright	U19	2007	Virginia
Aminata	Yanni	U18	2000	Harlem H.S. (IL)
Julie	Zeilstra	U19	1989	Stanford
Allie	Ziebell	U19	2023	Neenah H.S./Connecticut
Sharnee'	Zoll	U19	2005	Virginia

== See also ==
- USA Basketball
- United States women's national basketball team
- United States women's national under-17 basketball team
- USA Women's Pan American Team
- USA Women's World University Games Team
- United States women's national 3x3 team
- FIBA Under-19 World Championship for Women
- FIBA Americas Under-18 Championship for Women
- United States men's national basketball team
- United States men's national under-19 basketball team
- United States men's national under-17 basketball team
