= FIBA U18 Women's AmeriCup =

Youth basketball championship

- Current season, competition or edition: 2026 FIBA U18 Women's AmeriCup
- Formerly: FIBA Under-18 Women's Americas Championship; FIBA Americas Under-19 Championship for Women
- Sport: Women's basketball
- Founded: 1988; 38 years ago
- Organizing body: FIBA Americas
- No. of teams: 8
- Continent: Americas
- Most recent champions: United States (13th title)
- Most titles: United States (13 titles)
- Qualification: FIBA Under-19 Women's Basketball World Cup
- Related competitions: FIBA U16 Women's AmeriCup
- Website: www.fiba.basketball/history

The FIBA U18 Women's AmeriCup, previously known as the FIBA Under-18 Women's Americas Championship, is the Americas basketball championship for women's under-18 national teams that takes place every two years in the FIBA Americas zone.

Before the 2004 edition, the tournament was played by under-19 teams. The top four finishers qualify for the FIBA Under-19 Women's Basketball World Cup.

== Qualification ==
USA and Canada are the only teams that participate in the Under-18 Women's AmeriCup without playing qualifiers. The top three teams from the Under-17 Women's Centrobasket along with the top three teams from the Under-17 Women's South American Championship qualify for this event.

== Summary ==
Year	Host	Gold medal game			Bronze medal game		
Year	Host	Gold	Score	Silver	Bronze	Score	Fourth place
1988	Brazil (São Paulo)	United States	70–68	Brazil	Cuba	–	Canada
1992	Mexico (Guanajuato)	Brazil	80–70	United States	Cuba	–	Puerto Rico
1996	Mexico (Cancún)	Brazil	82–78	United States	Argentina	69–61	Cuba
2000	Argentina (Mar del Plata)	United States	69–46	Cuba	Brazil	59–39	Argentina
2004	Puerto Rico (Mayagüez)	United States	121–56	Puerto Rico	Canada	47–43	Brazil
2006	United States (Colorado Springs)	United States	85–52	Canada	Argentina	73–69	Brazil
2008	Argentina (Buenos Aires)	United States	Round-robin group	Canada	Brazil	Round-robin group	Argentina
2010	United States (Colorado Springs)	United States	81–38	Brazil	Canada	81–42	Chile
2012	Puerto Rico (Gurabo)	United States	71–47	Brazil	Argentina	53–49	Canada
2014	United States (Colorado Springs)	United States	104–74	Canada	Argentina	69–67	Brazil
2016	Chile (Valdivia)	United States	109–62	Canada	Brazil	70–64	Puerto Rico
2018	Mexico (Mexico City)	United States	84–60	Canada	Argentina	62–52	Colombia
2020	Cancelled due to COVID-19 pandemic in North America and South America						
2022	Argentina (Buenos Aires)	United States	82–77	Canada	Argentina	55–50	Brazil
2024	Colombia (Bucaramanga)	United States	80–69	Canada	Argentina	73–66	Brazil
2026	Mexico (Irapuato)	United States	90–72	Canada	Argentina	73–49	Venezuela
2028	TBD (TBD)		–			–	

== Medal table ==
Rank	Nation	Gold	Silver	Bronze	Total
1	United States	13	2	0	15
2	Brazil	2	3	3	8
3	Canada	0	8	2	10
4	Cuba	0	1	2	3
5	Puerto Rico	0	1	0	1
6	Argentina	0	0	8	8
Totals (6 entries)		15	15	15	45

== Participation details ==
Team	(Brazil) 1988	(Mexico) 1992	(Mexico) 1996	(Argentina) 2000	(Puerto Rico) 2004	(United States) 2006	(Argentina) 2008	(United States) 2010	(Puerto Rico) 2012	(United States) 2014	(Chile) 2016	(Mexico) 2018	(Argentina) 2022	(Colombia) 2024	(Mexico) 2026	2028	Total
Argentina	5th	6th	3rd	4th	5th	3rd	4th	5th	3rd	3rd	—	3rd	3rd	3rd	3rd		14
Bolivia	—	—	—	—	8th	—	—	—	—	—	—	—	—	—	—		1
Brazil	2nd	1st	1st	3rd	4th	4th	3rd	2nd	2nd	4th	3rd	—	4th	4th	—		13
Canada	4th	5th	5th	5th	3rd	2nd	2nd	3rd	4th	2nd	2nd	2nd	2nd	2nd	2nd		15
Chile	7th	—	—	—	—	—	—	4th	—	6th	6th	6th	—	—	—		5
Colombia	—	8th	—	—	—	—	—	—	6th	—	—	4th	6th	6th	—		5
Costa Rica	—	—	7th	—	—	7th	—	8th	—	—	—	—	—	—	—		3
Cuba	3rd	3rd	4th	2nd	—	—	—	—	—	—	—	—	—	—	—		4
Dominican Republic	—	—	—	—	7th	—	—	—	8th	—	—	—	—	8th	8th		4
Ecuador	—	—	8th	—	—	—	—	—	—	—	—	—	—	—	—		1
El Salvador	—	—	—	—	—	—	—	—	—	8th	—	8th	8th	—	—		3
Guatemala	8th	—	—	—	6th	—	—	—	—	—	8th	—	—	—	—		3
Mexico	—	7th	6th	7th	—	—	—	6th	7th	7th	5th	7th	5th	7th	5th		11
Paraguay	—	—	—	—	—	5th	—	—	—	—	—	—	—	—	6th		2
Puerto Rico	6th	4th	—	8th	2nd	6th	6th	7th	5th	5th	4th	5th	7th	5th	7th		14
United States	1st	2nd	2nd	1st	1st	1st	1st	1st	1st	1st	1st	1st	1st	1st	1st		15
Venezuela	—	—	—	6th	—	—	5th	—	—	—	7th	—	—	—	4th		4

== Under-19 Women's World Cup record ==
Team	(United States); 1985	(Spain); 1989	(South Korea); 1993	(Brazil); 1997	(Czech Republic); 2001	(Tunisia); 2005	(Slovakia); 2007	(Thailand); 2009	(Chile); 2011	(Lithuania); 2013	(Russia); 2015	(Italy); 2017	(Thailand); 2019	(Hungary); 2021	(Spain); 2023	(Czech Republic); 2025	(China); 2027	Total
Argentina	—	—	—	9th	—	—	14th	3rd	13th	14th	15th	—	12th	15th	16th	15th	Q	11
Brazil	—	8th	5th	4th	7th	—	10th	9th	3rd	6th	10th	—	—	16th	14th	14th	—	12
Canada	8th	—	—	—	—	9th	9th	4th	5th	7th	8th	3rd	6th	5th	3rd	4th	Q	13
Chile	—	—	—	—	—	—	—	—	12th	—	—	—	—	—	—	—	—	1
Colombia	—	—	—	—	—	—	—	—	—	—	—	—	11th	—	—	—	—	1
Cuba	9th	10th	—	11th	6th	—	—	—	—	—	—	—	—	—	—	—	—	4
Mexico	—	—	—	—	—	—	—	—	—	—	—	12th	—	—	—	—	—	1
Puerto Rico	—	—	—	—	—	10th	—	—	—	—	—	14th	—	—	—	—	—	2
United States	5th	7th	7th	1st	3rd	1st	1st	1st	1st	1st	1st	2nd	1st	1st	1st	1st	Q	17
Venezuela	—	—	—	—	—	—	—	—	—	—	—	—	—	—	—	—	Q	1
Total	3	3	2	4	3	3	4	4	5	4	4	4	4	4	4	4	4	63

== See also ==
- FIBA Under-16 Women's AmeriCup
- FIBA Under-18 AmeriCup
- FIBA Under-19 Women's Basketball World Cup
