= Lina Pikčiutė =

Lithuanian basketball player

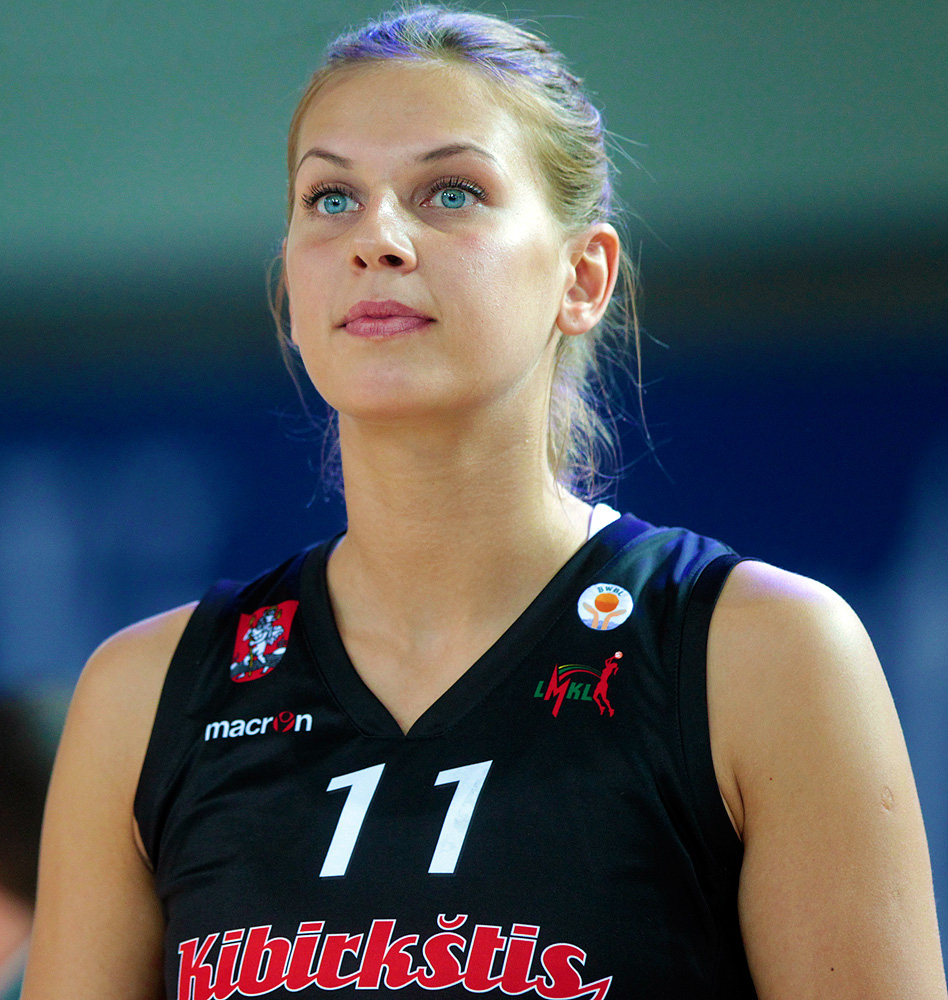

Personal information
- Born: 17 November 1990 (age 35) Klaipeda, Lithuania
- Listed height: 192 cm (6 ft 4 in)
- Position: Center

Career history
- 2006–2010: Klaipėdos
- 2010–2012: VIČI-Aistės Kaunas
- 2012–2014: Kibirkštis-VIČI Vilnius
- 2014–2015: Umeå Udominate
- 2015–2016: Uni Girona CB
- 2016–2017: Marijampolė Sūduva
- 2017: CD Zamarat
- 2017–2019: Gruener Stern Keltern
- 2019: Ciudad de los Adelantados
- 2019–2020: Laboratorios Ynsadiet Lagenes
- 2020–2021: Fjölnir
- 2022: BC Neptūnas

Career highlights
- Lithuanian Women Basketball Player of the Year (2013); 5× LMKL champion (2011–2014, 2017); 5× LMKL Cup winner (2011–2014, 2017); 3× BWBL champion (2011, 2012, 2014); DDBL champion (2018); Supercopa de España (2015)

Lina Pikčiutė (born 17 November 1990) is a Lithuanian basketball player. During her career, she has won the Lithuanian Women's Basketball League five times and the Damen-Basketball-Bundesliga once. In 2013, she was named the Lithuanian Basketball Federation women's player of the year.

== Playing career ==
During the 2014–2015 season, she played for Udominate Basket Umeå in the Swedish Basketligan dam, helping the team to the best record in the league. In the playoffs, Umeå lost to the Norrköping Dolphins in the finals. After winning her fifth LMKL title with Marijampolė Sūduva in 2017, she signed with CD Zamarat of the Spanish Liga Femenina for the 2017–2018 season.

In January 2019, Pikčiutė signed with Ciudad de los Adelantados of the Spanish LF2 and helped the team achieve promotion to the LF1. She continued to play in the LF2 the following season, signing with Laboratorios Ynsadiet Lagenes.

In May 2020, Pikčiutė signed with Úrvalsdeild kvenna club Fjölnir. On 3 October 2020, she had 29 points and 16 rebounds in a victory against Valur. During the regular season, Pikčiutė averaged 15.4 points and 12.5 rebounds per game, helping Fjölnir to an unexpected fourth-place finish. During the playoffs she averaged 16.3 points and 7.7 rebounds in Fjölnir's first round loss against eventual champions Valur.

== National team career ==
Pikčiutė debuted with the Lithuanian national team in 2013.
