= Lithuanian basketball league system =

The Lithuanian basketball league system is a series of interconnected competitions for professional basketball clubs in the European country of Lithuania. It is a hierarchical system that employs promotion and relegation between competitions at different "tiers". Basketball in Lithuania is governed by the FIBA-affiliated Lithuanian Basketball Federation.

== Leagues ==
=== Men's ===
As in a typical promotion and relegation system, the NKL champion earns the right to promotion to the LKL for the following season, while the last-placed LKL team is relegated to the NKL; the same thing applies between the RKL and the NKL. Movement between tiers is not automatic, as a club must meet the higher league's licensing and financial criteria, and an eligible club may decline promotion. In reality, teams often remain in their respective leagues regardless of final standing.

Level	League
1	LKL Lithuanian Basketball League Lietuvos krepšinio lyga (10 teams)
2	NKL National Basketball League Nacionalinė krepšinio lyga (15 teams)
3	RKL Regional Basketball League Regioninė krepšinio lyga (56 teams in 2 divisions)
	LSKL Lithuanian Students Basketball League Lietuvos studentų krepšinio lyga

=== Women's ===
Level	League
1	MLKL Women Lithuanian Basketball League Moterų Lietuvos Krepšinio Lyga (10 teams)

== Other domestic competitions ==
- King Mindaugas Cup
- S. Darius and S. Girėnas Cup
- LKU Leaders' Cup/Lyderių taurė
- KTU Cup
- Queen's Cup/Karalienės taurė

== See also ==
- League system
- European professional club basketball system
- Basketball in Lithuania
- EuroLeague
