= BC Kibirkštis =

BC VIČI-Aistės Kaunas was a Lithuanian women's basketball club based in Kaunas. Before ceasing operations due to financial difficulties, the team was the most titled women's basketball club in Lithuania.

== History ==
The team, originally called "Kibirkštis" (transl. "Spark"), was founded in Vilnius in 1961 as homage to a nearby electrical welding equipment plant. Its first coach was Algis Gedminas, a no-nonsense disciplinarian who had previously taught at a Moldavian pedagogical institute. Under Gedminas's direction, Kibirkštis quickly became a powerhouse in the Soviet Lithuanian women's basketball league, winning back-to-back championships in the late 1960s and early 1970s, as well as several bronze medals in the top-tier Soviet basketball tournament. The team was led by women who represented Soviet Union national team in various European Championships and Olympic Tournaments, including Larisa Vinčaitė, Angelė Jankūnaitė-Rupšienė and Vida Šulskytė-Beselienė.

After Lithuania's restoration of independence, the team continued to dominate in the Lithuanian basketball championship, attracting local talent such as Aneta Kaušaitė and Jurgita Štreimikytė-Virbickienė (the first two Lithuanian players in the WNBA) and international talent alike. During this transitionary period, Kibirkštis's name changed to "Ryšininkas-Šviesa" in 1990, "Telerina" in 1992, "Lietuvos Telekomas" in 1995 and "TEO" in 2006. The team also established a subsidiary club "Lintel-118" around 2000, which tailored to youth development and competed in LMKL and LMKAL until its folding in 2006. One notable alumna is Gintarė Petronytė, a two-time EuroCup Women champion who started her career with "Lintel-118" in 2005.

Telekomas reached unprecedented heights in the 2004-05 and 2005-06 season, when, headed by Algirdas Paulauskas, the team won the LMKL, BWBL tournaments and reached the semifinal in the top-tier EuroLeague Women tournament. WNBA All-Star and Champion Katie Douglas, European Basketball Champion Jurgita Štreimikytė and two-time EuroLeague bronze medalist Sandra Linkevičienė formed this team’s core.

In 2010, TEO relocated to Kaunas and was renamed "VIČI-Aistės". After two successful seasons, the team dissolved due to a lack of sponsorship.

== Titles ==
Season	Domestic League		Regional League		International League	
Season	League	Pos	League	Pos	League	Pos
1961–62	(Lithuanian Soviet Socialist Republic) Lithuanian Soviet Championship	3	(Soviet Union) USSR Championship	24		
1963–64			(Soviet Union) USSR Championship	14		
1964–65			(Soviet Union) USSR Championship	15		
1965–66	(Lithuanian Soviet Socialist Republic) Lithuanian Soviet Championship	3	(Soviet Union) USSR Championship	13		
1967–68	(Lithuanian Soviet Socialist Republic) Lithuanian Soviet Championship	1	(Soviet Union) USSR Championship	4		
1968–69	(Lithuanian Soviet Socialist Republic) Lithuanian Soviet Championship	1	(Soviet Union) USSR Championship	3		
1969–70	(Lithuanian Soviet Socialist Republic) Lithuanian Soviet Championship	1	(Soviet Union) USSR Championship	5		
1970–71	(Lithuanian Soviet Socialist Republic) Lithuanian Soviet Championship	1	(Soviet Union) USSR Championship	3		
1971–72	(Lithuanian Soviet Socialist Republic) Lithuanian Soviet Championship	1	(Soviet Union) USSR Championship	3		
1972–73	(Lithuanian Soviet Socialist Republic) Lithuanian Soviet Championship	3	(Soviet Union) USSR Championship	7		
1974–75			(Soviet Union) USSR Championship	6		
1975–76			(Soviet Union) USSR Championship	5		
1976–77			(Soviet Union) USSR Championship	4		
1977–78			(Soviet Union) USSR Championship	4		
1978–79			(Soviet Union) USSR Championship	4		
1979–80			(Soviet Union) USSR Championship	6		
1980–81			(Soviet Union) USSR Championship	9		
1981–82			(Soviet Union) USSR Championship	8		
1983–84			(Soviet Union) USSR Championship	3		
1989–90	(Lithuania) Lithuanian League	1				
1990–91	(Lithuania) Lithuanian League	1				
1991–92	(Lithuania) Lithuanian League	1				
1992–93	(Lithuania) Lithuanian League	1				
1994–95	(Lithuania) Lithuanian League	1	(European Union) Baltic League	1		
1995–96	(Lithuania) Lithuanian League	1	(European Union) Baltic League	2		
1996–97	(Lithuania) Lithuanian League		(European Union) Baltic League	2		
1997–98	(Lithuania) Lithuanian League		(European Union) Baltic League			
1998–99	(Lithuania) Lithuanian League		(European Union) Baltic League	3		
1999–00	(Lithuania) Lithuanian League	1	(European Union) Baltic League	1		
2000–01	(Lithuania) Lithuanian League	1	(European Union) Baltic League	1	Euroleague Women	Eight Final
2001–02	(Lithuania) Lithuanian League	1	(European Union) Baltic League	1	Euroleague Women	Group Stage
2002–03	(Lithuania) Lithuanian League	1	(European Union) Baltic League	1		
2003–04	(Lithuania) Lithuanian League	1	(European Union) Baltic League	1	Euroleague Women	Group Stage
2004–05	(Lithuania) Lithuanian League	1	(European Union) Baltic League	1	Euroleague Women	3
2005–06	(Lithuania) Lithuanian League	1	(European Union) Baltic League	1	Euroleague Women	4
2006–07	(Lithuania) Lithuanian League	1	(European Union) Baltic League	1		
2007–08	(Lithuania) Lithuanian League	1	(European Union) Baltic League	1		
2008–09	(Lithuania) Lithuanian League	1	(European Union) Baltic League	1		
2009–10	(Lithuania) Lithuanian League	1	(European Union) Baltic League	1		
2010–11	(Lithuania) Lithuanian League	1	(European Union) Baltic League	1		
2011–12	(Lithuania) Lithuanian League	1	(European Union) Baltic League	1		

== Notable players ==
- (Lithuania) Larisa Vinčaitė (1963–1973)
- (Lithuania) Angelė Jankūnaitė-Rupšienė (1968–1984)
- (Lithuania) Vida Šulskytė-Beselienė (1973–1988)
- (Lithuania) Aneta Kaušaitė (1988–1993)
- (Lithuania) Jurgita Štreimikytė-Virbickienė (1990–1993; 2004–2005; 2005–2010)
- (Lithuania) Irena Baranauskaitė-Vizbarienė (1995–2007)
- (Lithuania) Aušra Bimbaitė (2001–2009; 2010–2011)
- (Lithuania) Eglė Šulčiūtė (2001–2003; 2004–2007)
- (Lithuania) Gintarė Petronytė (2005–2009)
- (Lithuania) Sandra Valužytė-Linkevičienė (1999–2008; 2011)
- (Lithuania) Rima Vadapalaitė-Valentienė (1998–2009; 2010–2012)
- (Latvia) Ieva Kubliņa (2004–2006)
- (United States) Katie Douglas (2004–2007)
- (Belarus) Yelena Leuchanka (2006–2008)
- (Serbia) Milica Dabović (2007)
- (United States) Nykesha Sales (2007–2008)
- (United States) Crystal Langhorne (2008–2009)
- (United States) Lindsey Harding (2009–2010)
- (United States) (Turkey) Quanitra Hollingsworth (2010–2011)
- (Sweden) Chioma Nnamaka (2009–2010)

== Head coaches ==
- Algis Gedminas (1961–1981)
- Valentinas Kanapkis (1981–1986)
- Heino Lill (1988–1989)
- Valentinas Kanapkis (1994–1997)
- Algirdas Budėnas (1998–2001)
- Algirdas Paulauskas (2001–2007)
- Rūtenis Paulauskas (2007–2009)
- Mantas Šernius (2010–2012)
