= 2010 Lithuania men's FIBA World Championship team =

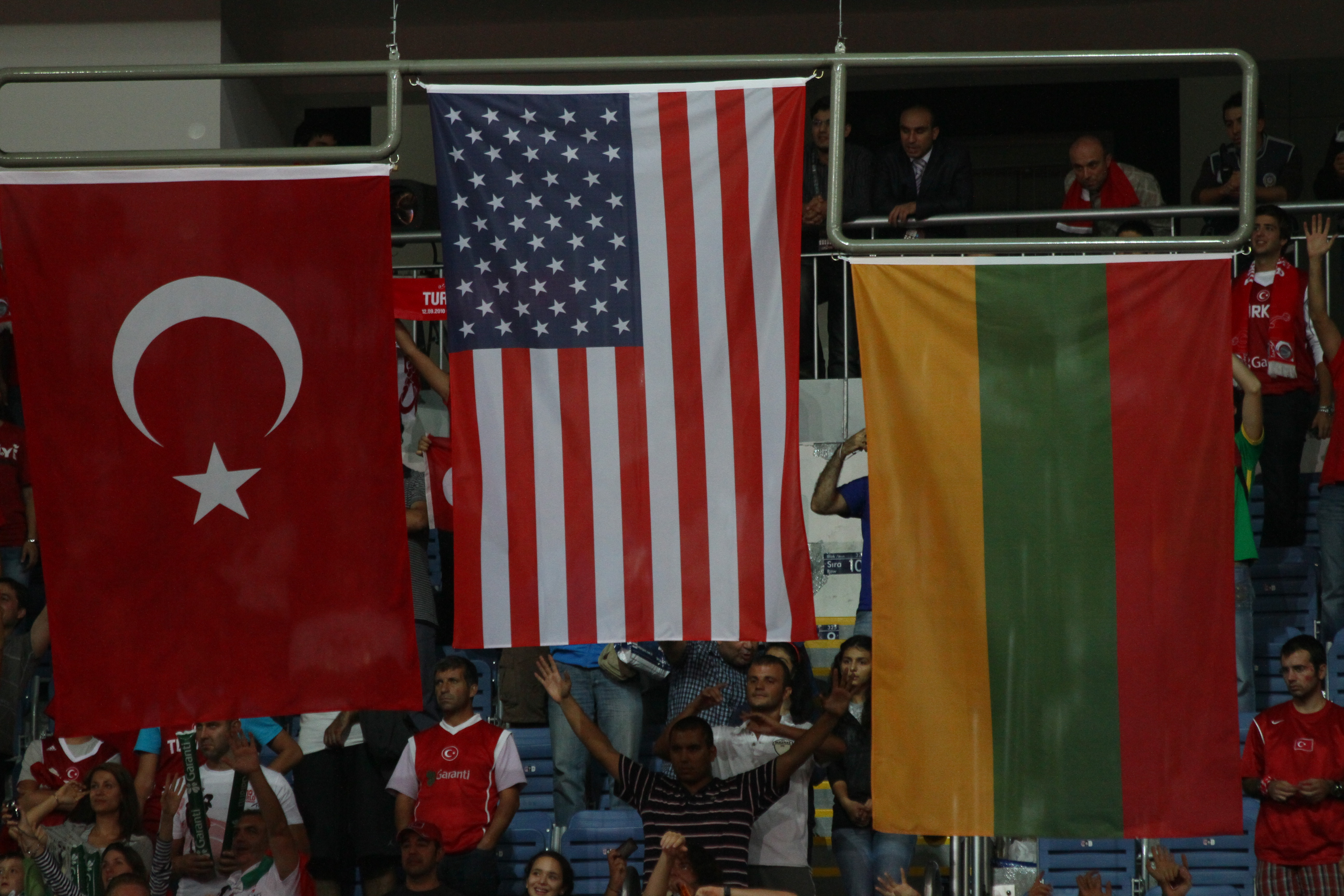
Lithuania flag during the awarding ceremony

Lithuania men's national basketball team had its third appearance at the FIBA World Championship at the 2010 FIBA World Championship in Turkey. Despite qualifying only as a wild card invitation by FIBA following an underwhelming performance at EuroBasket 2009, Lithuania had its best performance ever at the World Championship, losing only the semifinal against the United States en route to a bronze medal.

== 2010 FIBA World Championship Roster ==
=== Main roster ===
Lithuanian National Basketball Team roster
Players
Coaches

Pos.	No.	Name	Age – Date of birth	Height	Club	Ctr.
SG	4	Renaldas Seibutis	25 – 23 July 1985	1.96 m (6 ft 5 in)	CB Bilbao Berri	(Spain)
PG	5	Mantas Kalnietis	23 – 6 September 1986	1.96 m (6 ft 5 in)	BC Žalgiris	(Lithuania)
SF	6	Jonas Mačiulis	25 – 10 February 1985	2.00 m (6 ft 7 in)	Armani Jeans Milano	(Italy)
SG	7	Martynas Pocius	24 – 28 April 1986	1.96 m (6 ft 5 in)	BC Žalgiris	(Lithuania)
SG	8	Martynas Gecevičius	22 – 16 May 1988	1.93 m (6 ft 4 in)	Lietuvos Rytas	(Lithuania)
G	9	Tomas Delininkaitis	29 – 11 July 1981	1.90 m (6 ft 3 in)	PAOK BC	(Greece)
SF	10	Simas Jasaitis	28 – 26 March 1982	2.01 m (6 ft 7 in)	Galatasaray Cafe Crown	(Turkey)
F	11	Linas Kleiza	25 – 3 January 1985	2.03 m (6 ft 8 in)	Toronto Raptors	(Canada)
F/C	12	Tadas Klimavičius	27 – 10 October 1982	2.04 m (6 ft 8 in)	BC Žalgiris	(Lithuania)
PF	13	Paulius Jankūnas	26 – 29 April 1984	2.06 m (6 ft 9 in)	BC Žalgiris	(Lithuania)
C	14	Martynas Andriuškevičius	24 – 12 March 1986	2.21 m (7 ft 3 in)	CB Lucentum Alicante	(Spain)
C	15	Robertas Javtokas (C)	30 – 20 March 1980	2.11 m (6 ft 11 in)	Valencia BC	(Spain)

Head coach

- (Lithuania) Kęstutis Kemzūra

Assistant coach(es)

- (Lithuania) Robertas Kuncaitis
- (Lithuania) Donaldas Kairys

Legend

- (C) Team captain
- Club field describes current pro club

=== Reserves roster ===
Pos	Height	Player	Year of birth	Current club
PG	1.88 m	Arvydas Eitutavičius*	1982	(France) Cholet Basket
PG	1.85 m	Aidas Viskontas	1986	(Lithuania) Perlas Vilnius
G	1.92 m	Martynas Mažeika	1985	(Greece) AEK Athens
SG	1.94 m	Adas Juškevičius	1989	(Lithuania) Žalgiris Kaunas
SG	1.98 m	Renaldas Seibutis*	1985	(Europe) Free agent
SF	2.00 m	Deividas Gailius	1988	(Italy) Virtus Bologna
SF	1.96 m	Arvydas Šikšnius	1987	(Lithuania) Lietuvos Rytas Vilnius
F	2.04 m	Mindaugas Kuzminskas	1989	(Lithuania) BC Šiauliai
PF	2.03 m	Vytautas Šarakauskas	1982	(Lithuania) BC Šiauliai
PF	2.03 m	Valdas Vasylius	1983	(Europe) Free Agent
PF	2.05 m	Valdas Dabkus	1984	(Cyprus) InterCollege Etha Engomis
F/C	2.04 m	Tadas Klimavičius*	1982	(Lithuania) Žalgiris Kaunas
C	2.21 m	Martynas Andriuškevičius*	1986	(Spain) CB Lucentum Alicante
Coach
		Robertas Kuncaitis	1964	(Lithuania) Lietuvos Rytas Vilnius

* denotes players that were placed in the main roster.

Candidates that did not make it to the final team:

#	Position	Player	Year of birth	Last season's club before the tournament	Notes
	Forward	Mindaugas Katelynas	1983	(Spain) CB Lucentum Alicante	Sustained an injury while in training camp
	Center	Donatas Motiejūnas	1990	(Italy) Benetton Treviso	Released from the team after game against Czech Republic (2010-08-02)
	Guard	Giedrius Gustas	1980	(Greece) Panorama BC	Released from the team after game against Spain (2010-08-07)
	Guard	Arvydas Eitutavičius	1982	(France) Cholet Basket	Released from the team after game against USA (2010-08-21)
	Guard	Mindaugas Lukauskis	1979	(France) ASVEL Lyon-Villeurbanne	Released from the team after game against USA (2010-08-21)
Other candidates that did not make it to the training camp
	Forward	Ramūnas Šiškauskas	1978	(Russia) CSKA Moscow	Retired from national team after 2008 Summer Olympics
	Guard	Arvydas Macijauskas	1980	(European Union) Free agent	Decided to end career
	Guard	Rimantas Kaukėnas	1977	(Spain) Real Madrid	Decided not to play because family circumstances
	Center	Marijonas Petravičius	1979	(Italy) Armani Jeans Milano	Cannot play because of back injury
	Forward	Kšyštof Lavrinovič	1979	(Italy) Montepaschi Siena	Cannot play because of back injury
	Center	Darjuš Lavrinovič	1979	(Spain) Real Madrid	Cannot play because the new club didn't give permission to participate
	Guard	Šarūnas Jasikevičius	1976	(Greece) Panathinaikos Athens	Decided not to play
	Forward	Artūras Jomantas	1985	(Lithuania) BC Lietuvos Rytas	Cannot play because of minor injuries

== Preparation matches ==
Note: All times are UTC+2

=== Reserve Team ===
July 6
20:30

England	73–78	Lithuania
Scoring by quarter: 22-19, 21-23, 15-20, 15-16

England

July 7
20:30

England	78–92	Lithuania
Scoring by quarter: 21-19, 19-31, 24-18, 14-24

England

July 13
11:00

CBA Team (China)	81–107	Lithuania
Scoring by quarter: 27-24, 24-32, 18-26, 12-25

China

July 14
14:30

CBA Team (China)	68–84	Lithuania
Scoring by quarter: 11-31, 19-15, 16-24, 22-14

China

July 16
14:30

China	86–82	Lithuania
Scoring by quarter: 22-15, 24-22, 16-17, 24-28

China

July 18
14:30

China	81–77	Lithuania
Scoring by quarter: 10-6, 20-19, 23-30, 26-22

China

July 20
14:30

China	68–79	Lithuania
Scoring by quarter: 10-26, 16-15, 23-22, 19-16

China

=== Main Team ===
July 31
21:00

Lithuania	91–59	Finland
Scoring by quarter: 28-16, 23-22, 30-14, 10-7

Šiaulių arena, Šiauliai, Lithuania

August 2
19:10

Report

Lithuania	93–84 (OT)	Czech Republic
Scoring by quarter: 25-24, 24-18, 11-19, 15-14, Overtime: 18-9

Cido arena, Panevėžys, Lithuania

August 6
21:30

Report

Lithuania	86–84	Slovenia
Scoring by quarter: 21-23, 19-15, 27-25, 19-21

Vitoria, Spain

August 7
21:00

Report

Spain	97–76	Lithuania
Scoring by quarter: 30-16, 25-26, 23-15, 19-19

Vitoria, Spain

August 13
22:00

Report

Lithuania	80–77	Turkey
Scoring by quarter: 23-18, 15-16, 22-26, 20-17

Bamberg, Germany

August 14
19:15

Report

Germany	67–78	Lithuania
Scoring by quarter: 25-22, 10-18, 11-18, 21-20

Bamberg, Germany

August 15
17:30

Report

Lithuania	93–82	Croatia
Scoring by quarter: 17-24, 26-21, 20-24, 30-13

Bamberg, Germany

August 20
21:30

Report

Spain	94–75	Lithuania
Scoring by quarter: 24-19, 25-22, 25-13, 20-21

Madrid, Spain

August 21
22:00

Report

Lithuania	61–77	United States
Scoring by quarter: 15-7, 14-21, 20-29, 12-20

Madrid, Spain

August 24
19:10

Report

Lithuania	94–67	(Lithuania) Kauno Žalgiris
Scoring by quarter: 25-13, 21-12, 24-17, 24-25

Kaunas Sports Hall, Kaunas, Lithuania

== FIBA World Championship 2010 ==
Note: All times are local

=== Preliminary round ===
August 28
16:00

Report

New Zealand	79–92	Lithuania
Scoring by quarter: 24–25, 10–25, 27–24, 18–18
Pts: Penney 37; Rebs: Abercrombie 11; Asts: Cameron, Tait 3		Pts: Kleiza 27; Rebs: Kleiza 8 Asts: Kalnietis, Mačiulis 4

Halkapınar Sport Hall, İzmir
Attendance: 3,500
Referees: Anthony Dewayne Jordan (USA), Srdan Dozai (CRO), Milivoje Jovcic (SRB)

August 29
16:00

Report

Lithuania	70–68	Canada
Scoring by quarter: 12–20, 21–23, 22–14, 15–11
Pts: Kleiza 18; Rebs: Kleiza 10; Asts: Pocius 4		Pts: Anderson 15; Rebs: Kendall 11; Asts: Anderson 5

Halkapınar Sport Hall, İzmir
Attendance: 3,000
Referees: Luigi Lamonica (ITA), Jakub Zamojski (POL), Juan Jose Fernandez (ARG)

August 31
21:00

Report

Spain	73–76	Lithuania
Scoring by quarter: 22–11, 21–24, 21–18, 9–23
Pts: Navarro, Gasol 18; Rebs: Fernández 9 Asts: Garbajosa, López 3		Pts: Kleiza 17; Rebs: Kleiza, Javtokas 8 Asts: Kalnietis 5

Halkapınar Sport Hall, İzmir
Attendance: 7,000
Referees: Luigi Lamonica (ITA), Anthony Dewayne Jordan (USA), Milivoje Jovcic (SRB)

September 1
21:00

Report

Lithuania	69–55	France
Scoring by quarter: 11–24, 13–6, 28–11, 17–14
Pts: Mačiulis 19; Rebs: Javtokas 5 Asts: Kleiza 3		Pts: Batum 13; Rebs: Diaw 6 Asts: Batum 3

Halkapınar Sport Hall, İzmir
Attendance: 7,100
Referees: Jorge Vasquez (PUR), Anthony Dewayne Jordan (USA), Juan Jose Fernandez (ARG)

September 2
18:30

Report

Lebanon	66–84	Lithuania
Scoring by quarter: 16–16, 16–23, 19–25, 15–20
Pts: Fahed 19; Rebs: Rustom, Abdelnour 6 Asts: Rustom 5		Pts: Seibutis 17; Rebs: Andriuškevičius, Klimavičius 7 Asts: Delininkaitis 4

Halkapınar Sport Hall, İzmir
Attendance: 4,300
Referees: Jorge Vazquez (PUR), Milivoje Jovcic (SRB), Jakub Zamojski (POL)

=== Knockout stage ===
Round of 16

September 7
18:00

Report

Lithuania	78–67	China
Scoring by quarter: 17–22, 26–18, 21–11, 14–16
Pts: Kleiza 30; Rebs: Kleiza 9 Asts: Kalnietis 5		Pts: Liu W. 21; Rebs: Yi J.L. 12; Asts: Liu W., Wang Z.Z., Wang S.P. 3

Sinan Erdem Dome, Istanbul
Attendance: 15,000
Referees: Christos Christodoulou (GRE), Recep Ankarali (TUR), Yuji Hirahara (JPN)

Quarterfinals

September 9
21:00

Report

Lithuania	104–85	Argentina
Scoring by quarter: 28–18, 22–12, 35–23, 19–32
Pts: Jasaitis 19; Rebs: Kleiza 9 Asts: Kalnietis, Jankūnas 5		Pts: Delfino 25; Rebs: Oberto, Jasen 5 Asts: Prigioni 6

Sinan Erdem Dome, Istanbul
Attendance: 15,000
Referees: Jorge Vasquez (PUR), Guerrino Cerebuch (ITA), Scott Jason Butler (AUS)

Semifinals

September 11
19:00

Report

United States	89–74	Lithuania
Scoring by quarter: 23–12, 19–15, 23–26, 24–21
Pts: Durant 38; Rebs: Odom 10; Asts: Billups, Rose, Westbrook 3		Pts: Javtokas 15; Rebs: Javtokas 9 Asts: Kalnietis, Mačiulis, Pocius, Delininkaitis 2

Sinan Erdem Dome, Istanbul
Attendance: 15,000
Referees: Carl Jungebrand (FIN), Sasa Pukl (SLO), Marcos Fornies Benito (BRA)

Third–place game

September 12
19:00

Report

Serbia	88–99	Lithuania
Scoring by quarter: 22–23, 16–25, 16–24, 34–27
Pts: Veličković 18; Rebs: Krstić 8 Asts: Rašić 10		Pts: Kleiza 33; Rebs: Jasaitis 10; Asts: Kleiza 4

Sinan Erdem Dome, Istanbul
Attendance: 15,000
Referees: Jorge Vasquez (PUR), Anthony Dewayne Jordan (USA), Christos Christodoulou (GRE)

=== Orders, decorations, and medals ===
National team players, coaches and staff members were awarded with State orders, decorations and medals for their success.

Award	Award title	Person	Position
	Order of the Lithuanian Grand Duke Gediminas Commander's Cross	Kęstutis Kemzūra	Head coach
	Order of the Lithuanian Grand Duke Gediminas Commander's Cross	Paulius Jankūnas	Player
	Order of the Lithuanian Grand Duke Gediminas Commander's Cross	Simas Jasaitis	Player
	Order of the Lithuanian Grand Duke Gediminas Commander's Cross	Robertas Javtokas	Player
	Order of the Lithuanian Grand Duke Gediminas Commander's Cross	Linas Kleiza	Player
	Order of the Lithuanian Grand Duke Gediminas Commander's Cross	Robertas Kuncaitis	Coach
	Order of the Lithuanian Grand Duke Gediminas Commander's Cross	Jonas Mačiulis	Player
	Order of the Lithuanian Grand Duke Gediminas Officer's Cross	Juozas Petkevičius	Technical manager
	Order of the Lithuanian Grand Duke Gediminas Knight's Cross	Martynas Andriuškevičius	Player
	Order of the Lithuanian Grand Duke Gediminas Knight's Cross	Tomas Delininkaitis	Player
	Order of the Lithuanian Grand Duke Gediminas Knight's Cross	Martynas Gecevičius	Player
	Order of the Lithuanian Grand Duke Gediminas Knight's Cross	Mantas Kalnietis	Player
	Order of the Lithuanian Grand Duke Gediminas Knight's Cross	Tadas Klimavičius	Player
	Order of the Lithuanian Grand Duke Gediminas Knight's Cross	Martynas Pocius	Player
	Order of the Lithuanian Grand Duke Gediminas Knight's Cross	Renaldas Seibutis	Player
	Order of the Lithuanian Grand Duke Gediminas Medal	Aidas Buzelis	Masseur
	Order of the Lithuanian Grand Duke Gediminas Medal	Rimtautas Gudas	Doctor
	Order of the Lithuanian Grand Duke Gediminas Medal	Donaldas Kairys	Coach-scout
	Order of the Lithuanian Grand Duke Gediminas Medal	Evaldas Kandratavičius	Physical training coach
	Order of the Lithuanian Grand Duke Gediminas Medal	Aleksejus Peletskij	Masseur
	Order of the Lithuanian Grand Duke Gediminas Medal	Mantas Šernius	Coach-scout
	Order of the Lithuanian Grand Duke Gediminas Medal	Vytenis Trumpickas	Doctor
