= Lithuanian Basketball Player of the Year =

Basketball award in Serbia

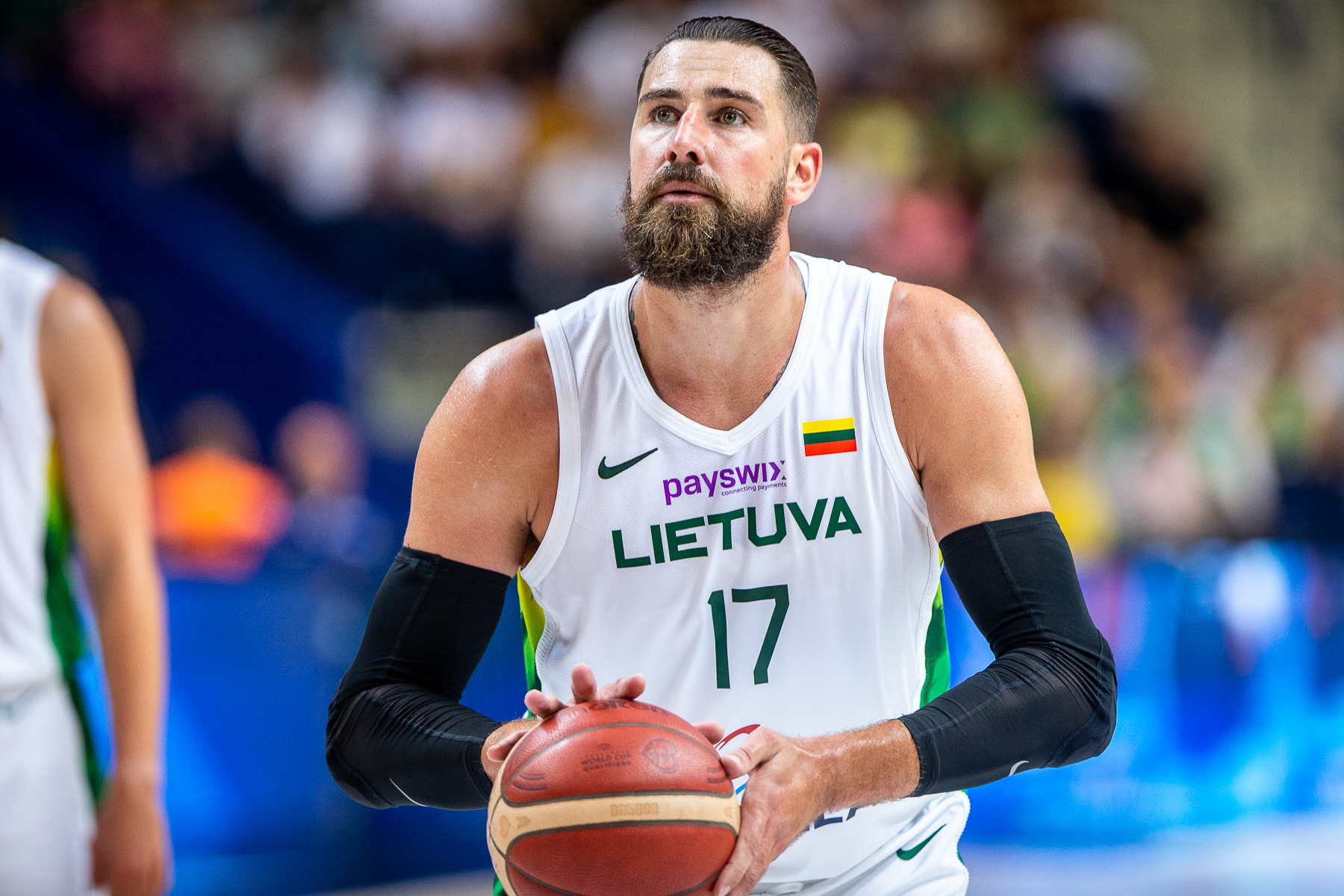
- Jonas Valančiūnas has won the men's award a record seven times.
- Sport: Basketball
- Awarded for: outstanding playing performance in a calendar year
- Location: Vilnius
- Country: Lithuania
- Presented by: Basketball Federation of Lithuania

History
- First award: 2008
- Editions: 17
- First winner: Ramūnas Šiškauskas
- Most wins: Jonas Valančiūnas (7x men), Gintarė Petronytė (7x women)
- Most recent: Jonas Valančiūnas (2025)

The Lithuanian Basketball Player of the Year award is established in 2008 to recognize the best basketball player of the year from Lithuania. The winners are basketball players who have Lithuanian citizenship, and whose performances with its basketball club and/or national team throughout the year has reached the highest level of excellence. All players with Lithuanian citizenship, regardless of where they play in the world, qualify for the award. The inaugural recipient was Ramūnas Šiškauskas (that year was only one nomination for men and women). The winners are selected by the Lithuanian Basketball Federation. Since 2009 the awards are given separately for men and women.

== All-time award winners ==
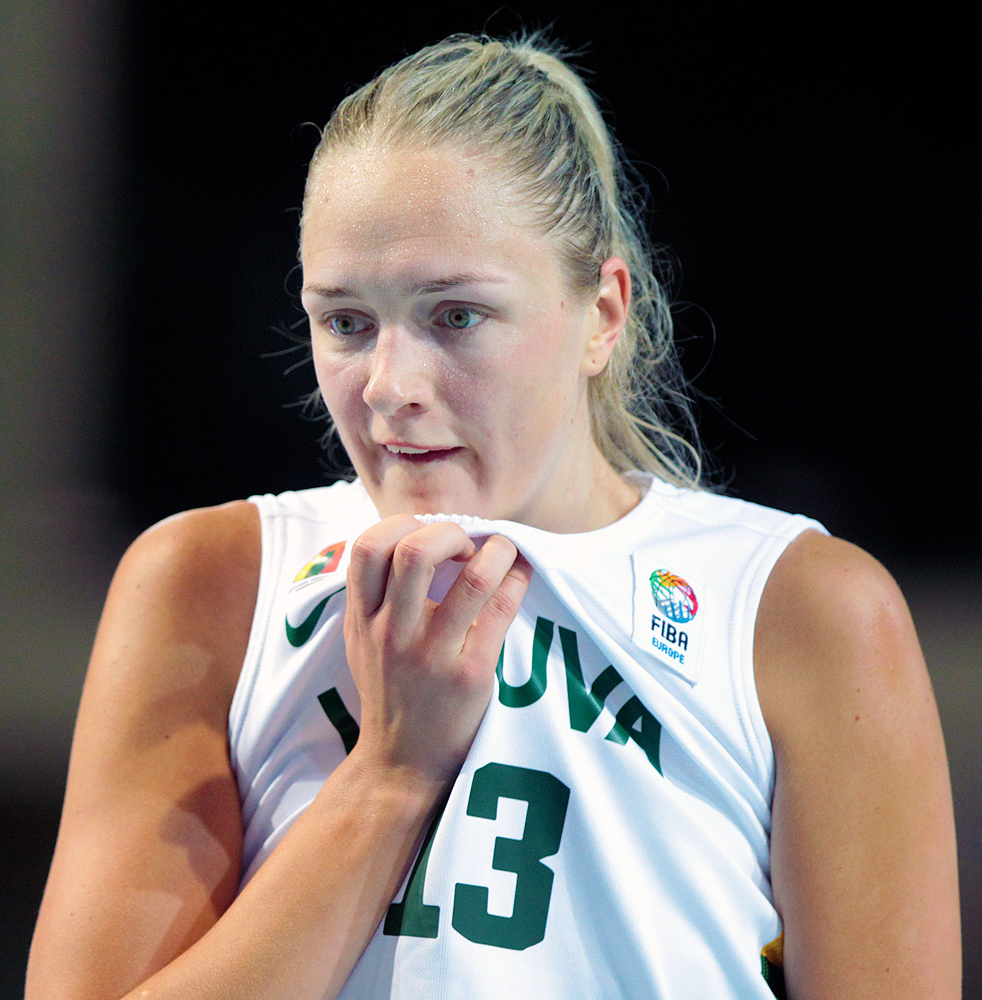
Gintarė Petronytė has won the women's award a record seven times

=== 2008-present ===
Year	Players of the Year (men)	Club(s)	Players of the Year (women)	Club(s)	References
2008	Ramūnas Šiškauskas	(Greece) Panathinaikos	One nomination for men and women		
2009	Linas Kleiza	(United States) Denver Nuggets	Gintarė Petronytė	(Greece) Sony Athinaikos Athens	
2010	Linas Kleiza (2x)	(Greece) Olympiacos	Sandra Linkevičienė	(Lithuania) VIČI-Aistės Kaunas	
2011	Jonas Valančiūnas	(Lithuania) Lietuvos rytas	Rima Valentienė	(Lithuania) VIČI-Aistės Kaunas	
2012	Jonas Valančiūnas	(Lithuania) Lietuvos rytas	Sandra Linkevičienė (2x)	(Lithuania) VIČI-Aistės Kaunas	
2013	Mantas Kalnietis	(Russia) Lokomotiv Kuban	Lina Pikčiutė	(Lithuania) Kibirkštis-VIČI Vilnius	
2014	Jonas Valančiūnas	(Canada) Toronto Raptors	Gintarė Petronytė	(Poland) Wisła Kraków	
2015	Jonas Mačiulis	(Spain) Real Madrid	Gintarė Petronytė	(Italy) Cases Mapei Napoli	
2016	Mindaugas Kuzminskas	(Spain) Baloncesto Málaga	Kamilė Nacickaitė	(Russia) Dynamo Moscow	
2017	Jonas Valančiūnas	(Canada) Toronto Raptors	Kamilė Nacickaitė	(Turkey) Adana ASKİ	
2018	Domantas Sabonis	(United States) Indiana Pacers	Kamilė Nacickaitė (3x)	(Spain) Gernika KESB	
2019	Domantas Sabonis	(United States) Indiana Pacers	Gintarė Petronytė	(Italy) Reyer Venezia	
2020	Domantas Sabonis	(United States) Indiana Pacers	Gintarė Petronytė	(Italy) Reyer Venezia	
2021	Jonas Valančiūnas	(United States) Memphis Grizzlies	Gintarė Petronytė	(Italy) Reyer Venezia	
2022	Domantas Sabonis	(United States) Indiana Pacers	Justė Jocytė	(France) ASVEL Féminin Lyon	
2023	Jonas Valančiūnas	(United States) New Orleans Pelicans	Gintarė Petronytė (7x)	(Lithuania) Kibirkštis Vilnius	
2024	Domantas Sabonis (5x)	(United States) Sacramento Kings	Gerda Raulušaitytė	(Lithuania) LCC International University Klaipėda	
2025	Jonas Valančiūnas (7x)	(United States) Denver Nuggets	Justė Jocytė (2x)	(Spain) Uni Girona CB	

== Multiple winners ==
=== Men ===
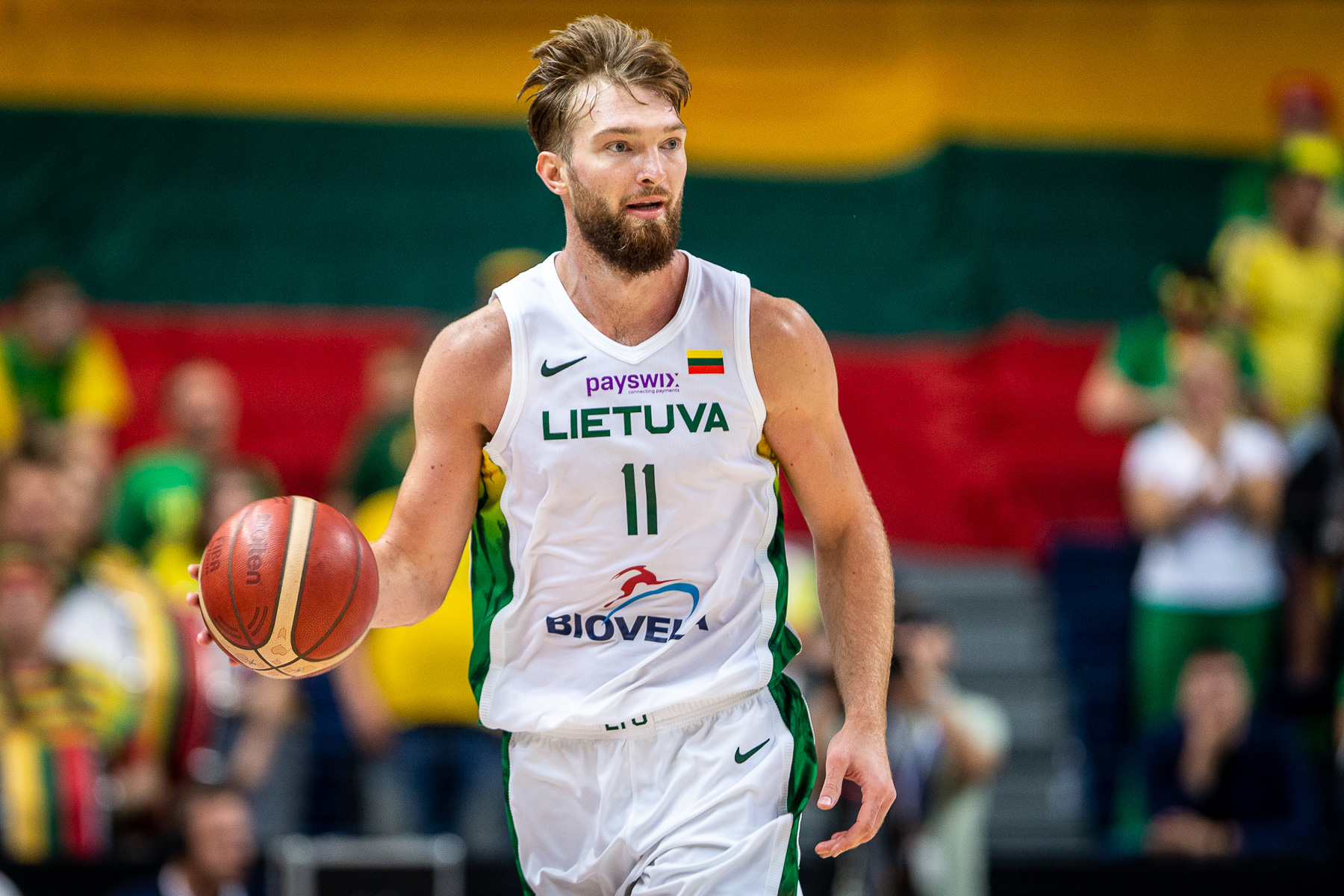
Domantas Sabonis, a five times winner of the men's award

Number	Players	Years
7	Jonas Valančiūnas	2011, 2012, 2014, 2017, 2021, 2023, 2025
5	Domantas Sabonis	2018–2020, 2022, 2024
2	Linas Kleiza	2009, 2010

=== Women ===
Number	Players	Years
7	Gintarė Petronytė	2009, 2014–2015, 2019–2021, 2023
3	Kamilė Nacickaitė	2016–2018
2	Justė Jocytė	2022, 2025

== See also ==
- Lithuanian Footballer of the Year

== Sources ==
- Winners 2008-2024
