= BC Neptūnas (women) =

Klaipėdos "Neptūnas" (Women)
- Leagues: LMKL; BWBL
- Founded: 2001
- History: Klaipėdos Lemminkainen; 2001–2012; Klaipėdos Fortūna; 2012–2019; Klaipėdos Neptūnas; 2019-present
- Arena: Žalgirio Sporto Rūmai (capacity: 250)
- Location: Klaipėda, Lithuania
- Team colors: Blue, White
- President: (Lithuania) Dainius Vaitelis
- Team manager: (Lithuania) Beata Zakalskytė
- Head coach: (Lithuania) Andra Gabalytė
- Championships: None
Home	Away

Klaipėdos "Neptūnas" (Women) is the major women basketball club of Klaipėda, Lithuania participating in Lithuanian Women Basketball League and EuroCup Women. Klaipėdos "Fortūna" basketball club was founded in 2001 as Lemminkainen, in 2012 after end of sponsorship it was changed to "Fortūna". In 2019 after partnership with men's team BC Neptūnas the name changed to Klaipėdos “Neptūnas”.

== Season by season ==
Season	LMKL	BWBL	LKF Cup	EuroCup Women
2007–08	3	–	–	–
2008–09	3	–	–	Preliminary Round
2009–10	2	2	–	Preliminary Round
2010–11	2	4	4	Sixteenth Finals
2011–12	5/6	4	4	Preliminary Round
2012–13	3	–	3	–
2013–14	3	–	2	–
2014-15	3	–	–	–
2015-16	5	–	–	–
2016-17	4	–	–	–
2017-18	4	–	–	–
2018-19	4	–	7	–
2019-20	3	–	–	–
2020–21	2	–	–	–
2021–22	2	3	3	–
2022–23	2	3	2	–
2023–24	3	3	1	–

== Roster ==
Klaipėdos „Neptūnas“ roster
Players
Coaches

Pos.	No.	Nat.	Name	Ht.	Wt.	Age
G	4	(Lithuania)	Donskichytė, Dalia	1.69 m (5 ft 7 in)	65 kg (143 lb)	26 – 14 April 2000
F	5	(Lithuania)	Tamutytė, Ligita	1.77 m (5 ft 10 in)	67 kg (148 lb)	26 – 18 October 1999
G	10	(United States)	Plentovich, Savannah	1.72 m (5 ft 8 in)		28 – 15 March 1998
SG	13	(Lithuania)	Gabalytė, Andra	1.79 m (5 ft 10 in)	71 kg (157 lb)	45 – 8 August 1980
C	14	(United States)	Zalin, Allison	1.83 m (6 ft 0 in)		31 – 19 May 1995
PF	31	(Brazil)	Pereira Dias, Maisa	1.83 m (6 ft 0 in)		24 – 20 March 2002
SF	37	(Lithuania)	Mickutė, Kamilė	1.80 m (5 ft 11 in)		25 – 16 June 2001
G	42	(Lithuania)	Černeckytė, Agnė	1.73 m (5 ft 8 in)	52 kg (115 lb)	30 – 5 March 1996
SG	44	(Lithuania)	Grinkevičiūtė, Ugnė	1.75 m (5 ft 9 in)		23 – 30 May 2003
PG	99	(Lithuania)	Paliulytė, Dominyka	1.71 m (5 ft 7 in)		25 – 2 July 2001

Head coach

- (Lithuania) Andra Gabalytė

Assistant coach(es)

- (Lithuania) Martynas Airošius

Athletic trainer(s)

- (Lithuania) Laurynas Juškevičius

Legend

- (C) Team captain
- Injured

- Roster

== Notable players ==
Criteria

To appear in this section a player must have either:

- Played at least three seasons for the club.
- Set a club record or won an individual award while at the club.
- Played at least one official international match for their national team at any time.
- Played at least one official WNBA match at any time.

- (Lithuania) Lina Pikčiūtė
- (Lithuania) Marina Solopova
- (Lithuania) Justė Jocytė
