= Lithuanian women's students basketball team =

The Lithuanian women's students basketball team (Lithuanian: Lietuvos studenčių moterų krepšinio rinktinė) represents Lithuania at various students competitions. Most of the team members plays at the Lietuvos studentų krepšinio lyga.
