= Justė Jocytė =

Lithuanian basketball player (born 2005)

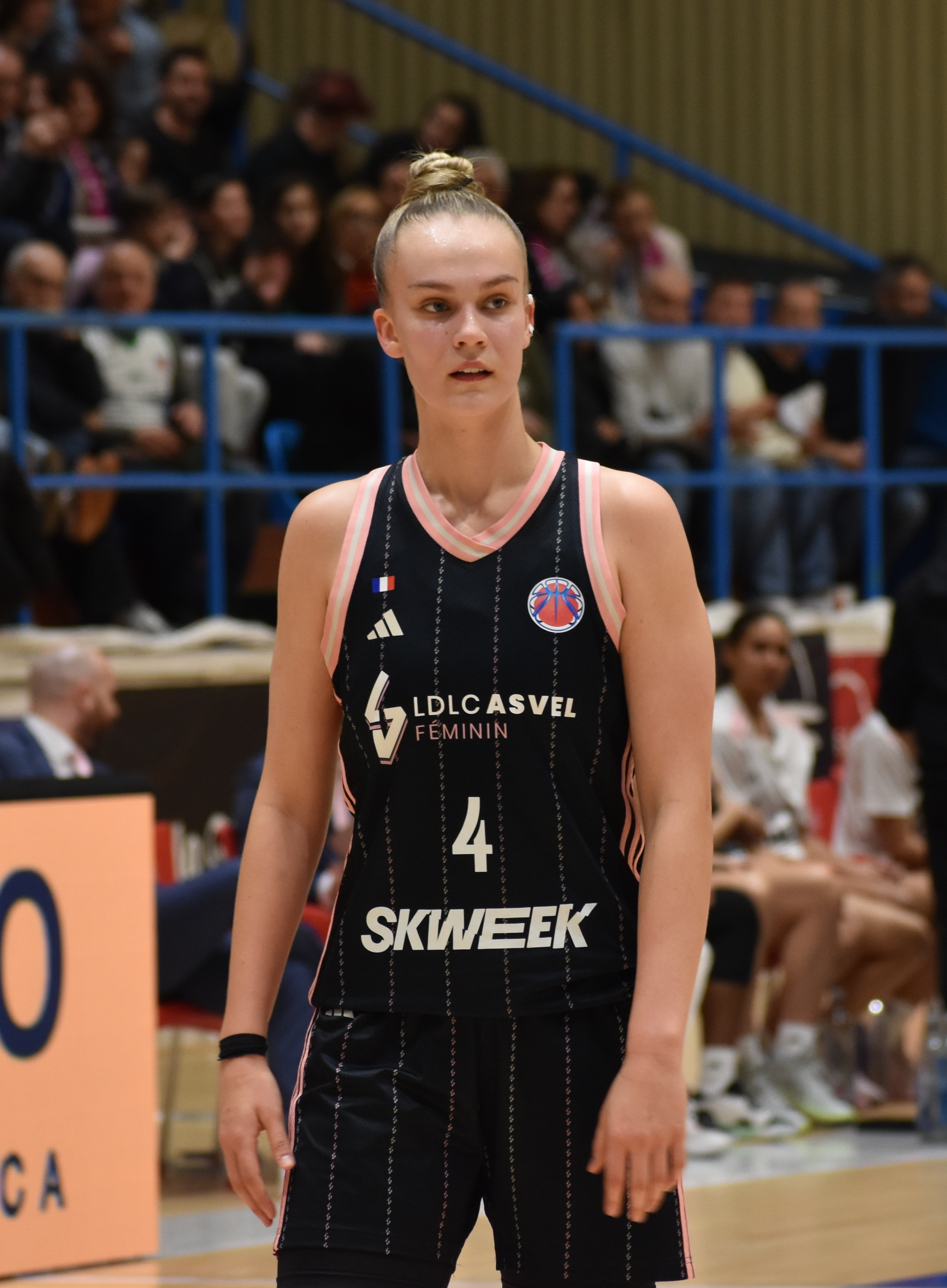
- Jocytė with ASVEL Féminin in 2025

No. 4 – Golden State Valkyries
- Position: Shooting guard / small forward
- League: WNBA

Personal information
- Born: 19 November 2005 (age 20) Washington, D.C., U.S.
- Listed height: 1.83 m (6 ft 0 in)

Career information
- WNBA draft: 2025: 1st round, 5th overall pick
- Drafted by: Golden State Valkyries
- Playing career: 2019–present

Career history
- 2019: Neptūnas Klaipėda
- 2019–2025: ASVEL Lyon
- 2025–2026: Uni Girona CB
- 2026–present: Golden State Valkyries

Career highlights
- WNBA champion (2026); EuroCup Women champion (2023); 2× Lithuanian Women Basketball Player of the Year (2022, 2025)
- Stats at Basketball Reference
Medals
Women's basketball
Representing Lithuania
FIBA U16 Women's EuroBasket
| Silver medal – second place | 2019 North Macedonia | Team competition |
FIBA U18 Women's EuroBasket
| Gold medal – first place | 2022 Greece | Team competition |

Justė Veronika Jocytė (born 19 November 2005) is a Lithuanian professional basketball player for the Golden State Valkyries of the Women's National Basketball Association (WNBA). Jocytė was selected fifth overall by the Valkyries in the 2025 WNBA draft.

== Professional career ==
=== Europe ===
==== Neptūnas Klaipėda (2019) ====
On 11 October 2019, Jocytė made a debut in the Moterų Lietuvos Krepšinio Lyga (MLKL), recording 21 points, five rebounds, five assists and three steals, leading her team Neptūnas to an 81–59 win against Kibirkštis–Viči Vilnius.

==== ASVEL Lyon (2019–2025) ====
In November 2019, Jocytė signed a three-year deal with the Tony Parker's ASVEL Lyon women's club and joined its youth team in the same month. On 8 December, being 14 years and 19 days old, Jocytė became the youngest player to debut in the Ligue Féminine de Basketball. On 18 December 2019, Jocytė became the youngest player (14 years and 29 days old) to debut in the EuroLeague Women.

On 10 February 2023, Jocytė was selected as the 2022 Lithuanian Basketball Player of the Year, together with male counterpart Domantas Sabonis.

==== Uni Girona CB (2025–2026) ====
In April 2025, Jocytė signed with Uni Girona CB of the Liga Femenina de Baloncesto. On 4 February 2026, Jocytė was selected as the Lithuanian Women Basketball Player of the Year for a second time.

=== WNBA ===
On 14 April 2025, Jocytė was selected fifth overall by the Golden State Valkyries in the 2025 WNBA draft, becoming the franchise's first-ever draft pick. This is the all-time highest WNBA draft pick for a Lithuanian women basketball player. She did not join the team for the 2025 season, choosing instead to focus on her national team duties for EuroBasket Women 2025.

==== Golden State Valkyries (2026–present) ====
On 7 May 2026, Jocytė's rookie scale contract with Golden State Valkyries was activated, and she was announced as part of the team's roster ahead of the 2026 WNBA season. On October 31, 2026, Jocytė became the first Lithuanian player to win the WNBA title. In her debut WNBA season she averaged 3.1 points, 0.8 rebounds, and 1.1 assists per game, her highest-scoring mark was 11 points on 19 September versus the Seattle Storm.

== National team career ==
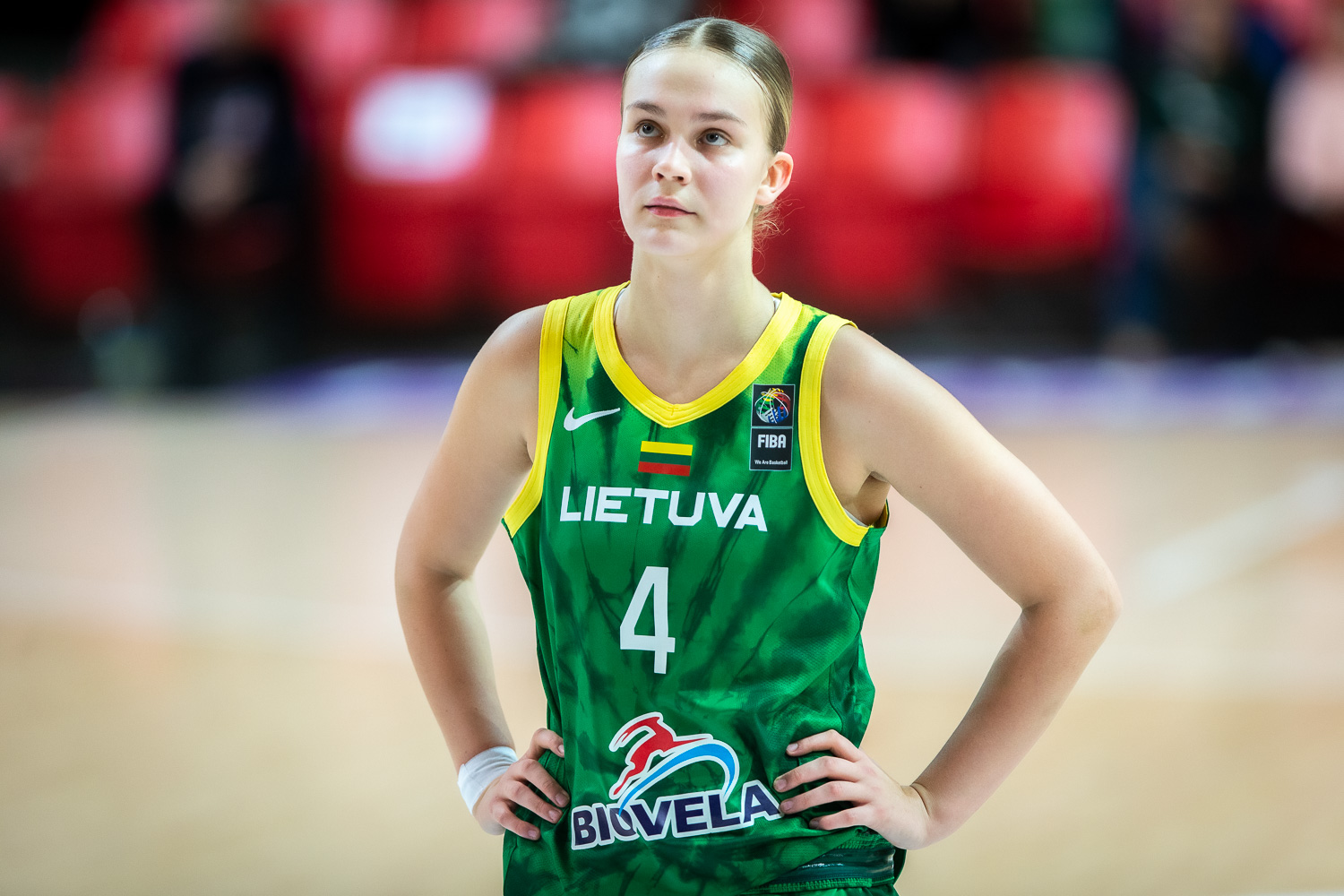
Jocytė with the senior Lithuania women's national basketball team in 2022

At just 13 years old, Jocytė led Lithuania under-16 team to a silver medal during the 2019 U16 European Championship. She was named to the All-Star Five after averaging 19.6 points, 8.3 rebounds and 2.1 assists in the tournament.

On 8 October 2019, Jocytė was invited to Lithuania senior team. Still being 13 years old, she made her debut with the national team on 14 November, during the EuroBasket 2019 qualification game in Kėdainiai, recording four points, one rebound and three assists, and helping the team to a 108–43 win over Albania senior team.

On 14 August 2022, Jocytė led Lithuania under-18 team to a gold medal in the 2022 U18 European Championship finals against Spain under-18 team.

Jocytė strongly contributed to the Lithuania women's national team return to the EuroBasket Women after four previously missed tournaments. In the EuroBasket Women 2025 qualification, being just 18–19 years old, she averaged 17 points, 3.8 rebounds, 3.3 assists. In the EuroBasket Women 2025 she averaged 16 points, 4.5 rebounds, 5.2 assists per game, however Lithuania was eliminated in the quarter-final by France (83–61).

== Personal life ==
Jocytė was born in Washington, D.C., United States. Her father, Alvydas Jocys, played basketball during his studies at Nebraska College. When the family returned to Palanga, Lithuania, her father continued to play in the amateur league. Her uncle Evaldas Jocys played basketball professionally in Europe. She began attending basketball trainings in Palanga, her first coach was Daiva Mažionienė. After two years she moved to Klaipėda and began training with coach Ramunė Kumpienė. She is nicknamed the Baby-Faced Assassin.

In addition to Lithuanian and English, she also speaks French fluently.

== Career statistics ==
Legend
| GP | Games played | GS | Games started | MPG | Minutes per game | RPG | Rebounds per game |
| APG | Assists per game | SPG | Steals per game | BPG | Blocks per game | PPG | Points per game |
| TO | Turnovers per game | FG% | Field-goal percentage | 3P% | 3-point field-goal percentage | FT% | Free-throw percentage |
| **Bold** | Career best | ° | League leader |

=== WNBA ===
==== Regular season ====
WNBA regular season statistics
| Year | Team | GP | GS | MPG | FG% | 3P% | FT% | RPG | APG | SPG | BPG | TO | PPG |
|---|---|---|---|---|---|---|---|---|---|---|---|---|---|
| 2026 | Golden State | 16 | 0 | 8.1 | .370 | .423 | .833 | .8 | 1.1 | .2 | .1 | .7 | 3.1 |
| **Career** | 1 year, 1 team | 16 | 0 | 8.1 | .370 | .423 | .833 | .8 | 1.1 | .2 | .1 | .7 | 3.1 |
