= Lithuania men's students basketball team =

The Lithuania men's students basketball team (Lithuanian: Lietuvos studentų vyrų krepšinio rinktinė) represents Lithuania at various students competitions. Most of the team members plays at the Lietuvos studentų krepšinio lyga, though some of them are members of the professional basketball clubs, such as Žalgiris Kaunas and Lietuvos rytas Vilnius. The team won gold medals at the 2007 Summer Universiade and bronze medals at the 2011 Summer Universiade.
