= Jonas Mačiulis =

Lithuanian basketball player and executive

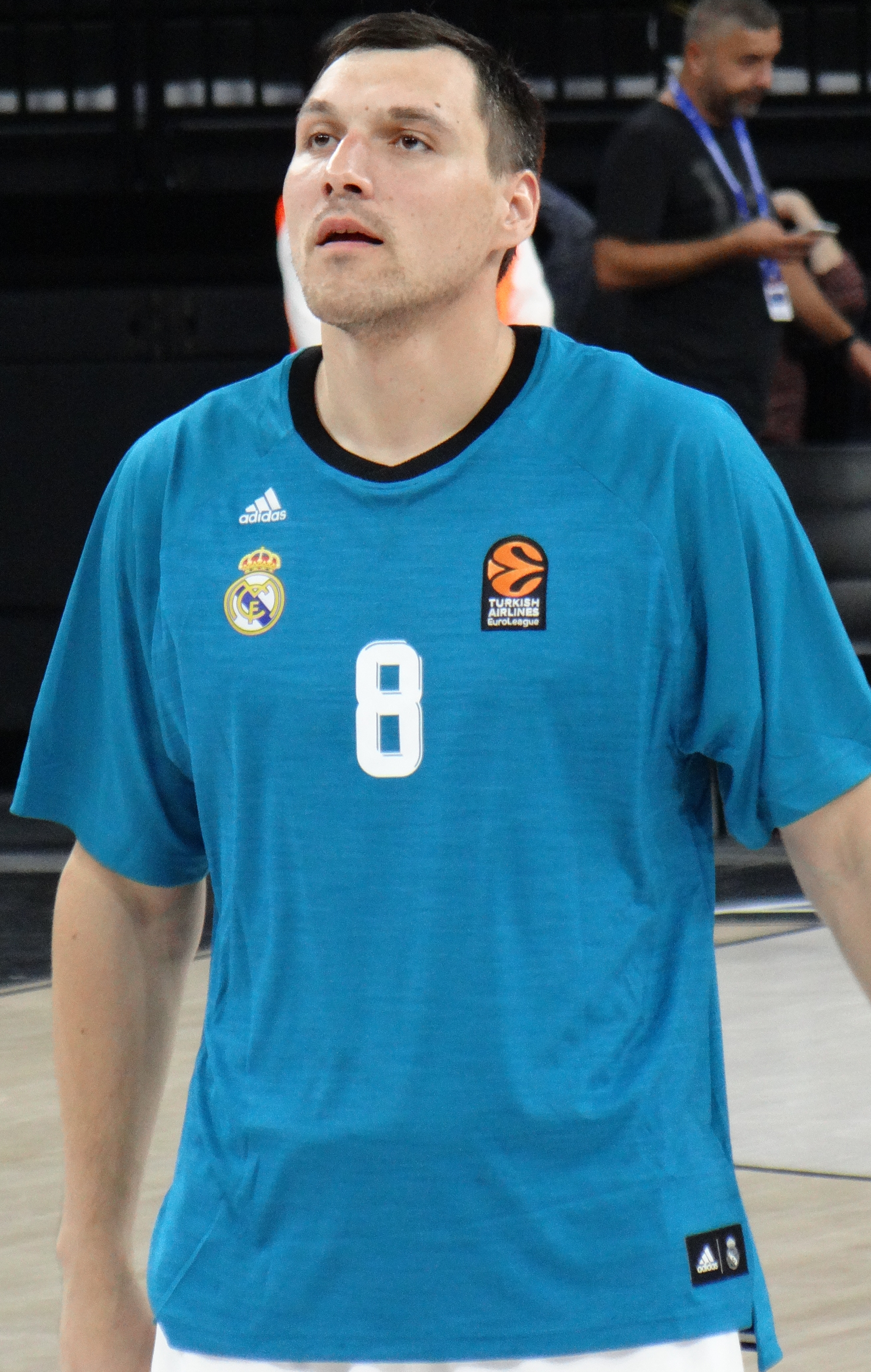
- Mačiulis in action with Real Madrid

Lietkabelis Panevėžys
- Title: General manager
- League: Lithuanian Basketball League; EuroCup

Personal information
- Born: 10 February 1985 (age 41) Kaunas, Lithuania
- Listed height: 6 ft 6 in (1.98 m)
- Listed weight: 235 lb (107 kg)

Career information
- NBA draft: 2007: undrafted
- Playing career: 2002–2021
- Position: Small forward / power forward
- Number: 8, 19, 18, 9

Career history
- 2002–2004: Žalgiris-2
- 2004–2009: Žalgiris Kaunas
- 2004–2005: →Nevėžis Kėdainiai
- 2009–2011: Olimpia Milano
- 2012: Baltai Kaunas
- 2012: Montepaschi Siena
- 2012–2014: Panathinaikos
- 2014–2018: Real Madrid
- 2018: Lokomotiv Kuban
- 2018–2021: AEK Athens

Career highlights
- 2x FIBA Intercontinental Cup champion (2015, 2019); 2x EuroLeague champion (2015, 2018); 3× Liga ACB champion (2015, 2016, 2018); 3× Spanish Cup winner (2015–2017); Spanish Supercup winner (2014); 2× Greek League champion (2013, 2014); 3× Greek Cup winner (2013, 2014, 2020); All-Greek League Team (2014); Greek All Star (2013, 2014, 2019, 2020); LBA champion (2012); 3× LKL champion (2006–2008); 2× Lithuanian Federation Cup winner (2007, 2008); Lithuanian Basketball Player of the Year (2015); 3× LKL All-Star (2007–2009); LKL All-Star Game Co-MVP (2007); Lithuanian Second Division champion (2003); 2× Baltic League champion (2006, 2008); Baltic League All-Star (2008)
Medals
Men's basketball
Representing Lithuania
FIBA World Cup
| Bronze medal – third place | Turkey 2010 |
EuroBasket
| Silver medal – second place | 2013 Slovenia |
| Silver medal – second place | 2015 France–Croatia–Germany–Latvia |
| Bronze medal – third place | 2007 Spain |
FIBA Under-21 World Cup
| Gold medal – first place | 2005 Argentina | Under-21 |
FIBA Under-19 World Cup
| Silver medal – second place | 2003 Greece | Under-19 |
FIBA Europe Under-20 Championship
| Silver medal – second place | 2005 Russia | Under-20 |
| Bronze medal – third place | 2004 Czech Republic | Under-20 |
Summer Universiade
| Gold medal – first place | 2007 Thailand |

Jonas Mačiulis (born 10 February 1985) is a Lithuanian professional basketball executive and former player, currently serving as the general manager for Lietkabelis Panevėżys of the Lithuanian Basketball League (LKL). Standing at 1.98 m (6 ft 6 in), he mainly played at the small forward position. As a member of the senior Lithuanian national team, he earned an All-EuroBasket Team selection in 2015, as Lithuania won the silver medal.

Mačiulis is currently playing for Kaunas team Reunion in the Kaunas Basketball League.

== Early years ==
Mačiulis spent two years competing in the LKAL, the Lithuanian League 2nd Division. He won the 2003 2nd Division title with LKKA-Žalgiris of Kaunas.

== Professional career ==
Mačiulis made his pro debut in 2004, with the Lithuanian League team Nevėžis. He averaged 13.6 points and 5.8 rebounds per game in his only season with the team. Mačiulis was signed by the Lithuanian team Žalgiris in 2005. He helped Žalgiris win a Baltic League title in 2008, two Lithuanian League titles in 2007 and 2008, and two Lithuanian Cups in 2007 and 2008.

Mačiulis made a leap in production in each of the early years of his career. He had a breakout season in 2006–07, averaging 12.7 points and 5.0 rebounds per game in the EuroLeague. Mačiulis averaged a career-high 14.0 points and 5.0 rebounds per game in the 2008–09 season in the Euroleague.

He scored a career-high 29 points against SLUC Nancy on 8 January 2009. In an 8 April 2009 game against the Lietuvos Rytas, Mačiulis set a Lithuanian League record for three-point field goals made in a game, making 8 in a row.

On 1 July 2009, Mačiulis signed with the Italian League team Olimpia Milano. The deal was worth €1.2 million net income over two years. Due to a knee injury, which prevented him from playing basketball for 9 months, Olimpia Milano did not offer him a new contract, despite his good performance before he suffered the injury.

On 8 February 2012, he signed with the Lithuanian team Baltai, until he could get a better contract with another team. The deal with Baltai was worth zero LTL (he played there for free). In his first game back after his injury, against Kalev/Cramo, he scored 16 points, grabbed 2 rebounds, and led Baltai to a victory.

On 24 April 2012, he signed with the Italian team Montepaschi Siena for the rest of the season.

On 24 July 2012, he signed a one-year deal with the Greek League team Panathinaikos. On 22 July 2013, he extended his contract for two more years. On 12 June 2014 he was waived.

On 26 July 2014, he signed a two-year deal with Real Madrid. In the 2014–15 season, Real Madrid won the EuroLeague, after defeating Olympiacos, by a score of 78–59, in the EuroLeague Final game. Real Madrid eventually finished the season winning the Spanish League championship, after a 3–0 series sweep in the Spanish League finals series against Barcelona. With that trophy, Real Madrid won the triple crown. He was also voted Lithuanian Basketball Player of the Year, for the first time in his career, in 2015, along with Gintarė Petronytė. On 21 May 2016 he signed a new "2+1" contract with the Real Madrid.

On 2 March 2018, he agreed to the termination of the contract with the Real Madrid.

On 6 March 2018, Mačiulis signed with Lokomotiv Kuban of the Russian VTB United League. On 10 July 2018, Mačiulis and Lokomotiv officially parted ways. He signed with AEK Athens on 9 August 2018. Mačiulis signed a contract extension on 2 August 2020.

On 9 September 2021, Mačiulis announced his retirement from professional basketball.

== National team career ==
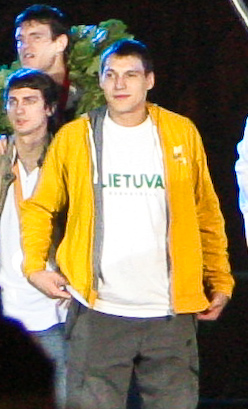
Mačiulis during the EuroBasket 2007 bronze medalists meeting ceremony in Vilnius. It was his first tournament with the national team.

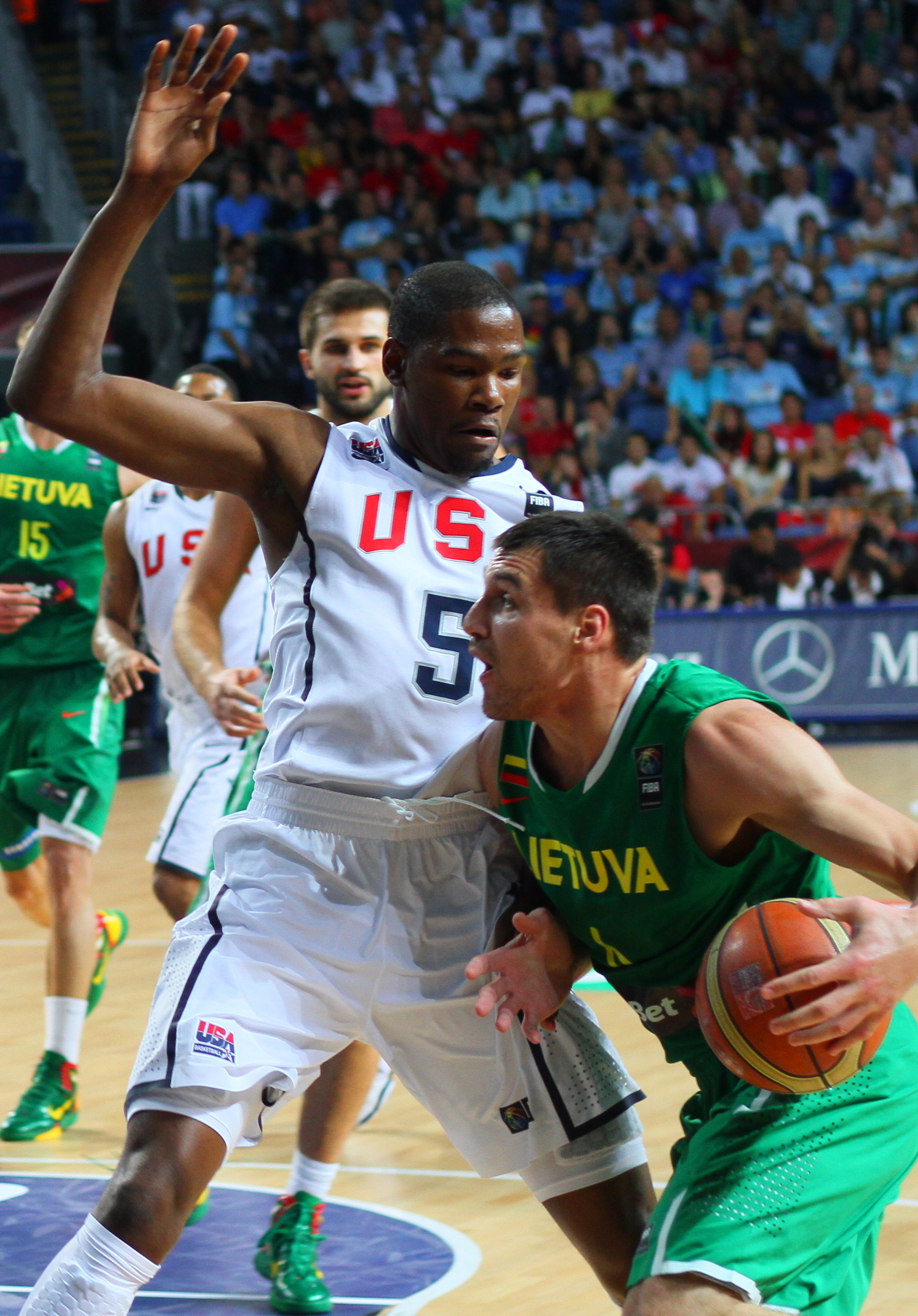
Mačiulis (right) with Lithuania men's national basketball team during the 2010 FIBA World Championship in Turkey.

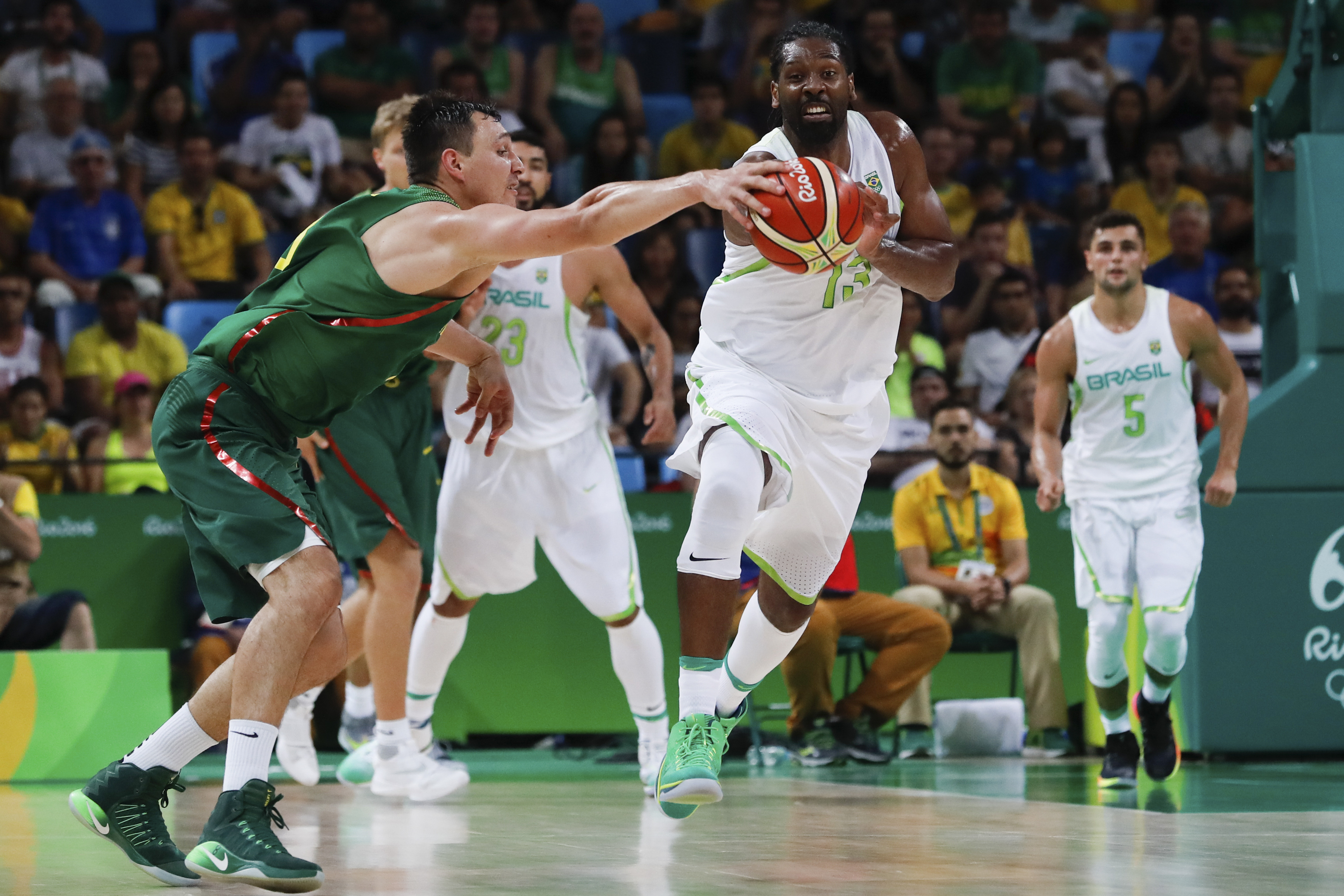
Mačiulis attempting a steal from Nenê during the 2016 Summer Olympics in Brazil.

Mačiulis was a member of numerous Lithuanian junior national teams. He played at the 2001 FIBA Europe Under-16 Championship. He won a silver medal at the 2003 FIBA Under-19 World Cup, a bronze medal at the 2004 FIBA Europe Under-20 Championship, a silver medal at the 2005 FIBA Europe Under-20 Championship, and a gold medal at the 2005 FIBA Under-21 World Cup.

As a member of the senior men's Lithuanian national basketball team, Mačiulis played at the EuroBasket 2007, where the Lithuanians claimed bronze medals. In the 2008 Summer Olympics, he took 4th place. In the 2010 FIBA World Championship, he won a bronze medal. In the EuroBasket 2013, Lithuania was runner-up, and Mačiulis played one of the best games of his career with national team, in the semi-finals against Croatia.

He was also a member of Lithuania's team at the EuroBasket 2009 and the 2012 Summer Olympics. He also played at the EuroBasket 2015. On 13 September 2015, in the eighth-finals game against Georgia, Mačiulis lead his team to an 85–81 win, posting tremendous numbers: 34 points, 6 rebounds, 3 assists, 4 steals, and 2 blocks. The Lithuanian team later won its second consecutive EuroBasket silver medal, and Mačiulis was included into the All-Tournament Team, after averaging 13.8 points, 6.3 rebounds, and 1.9 steals per game. His teammate, Jonas Valančiūnas, also made the All-Tournament Team.

== Post-playing career ==
Following his retirement, Mačiulis became a consultant for Nevėžis Kėdainiai of the Lithuanian Basketball League (LKL). On 10 June 2022, he was named sports director of Nevėžis.

On 18 November 2024, Mačiulis was appointed general manager of Lietkabelis Panevėžys.

== Career statistics ==
Legend
| GP | Games played | GS | Games started | MPG | Minutes per game |
| FG% | Field-goal percentage | 3P% | 3-point field-goal percentage | FT% | Free-throw percentage |
| RPG | Rebounds per game | APG | Assists per game | SPG | Steals per game |
| BPG | Blocks per game | PPG | Points per game | PIR | Performance index rating |
| **Bold** | Career high |

| † | Denotes seasons in which Mačiulis won the EuroLeague |

=== EuroLeague ===
| Year | Team | GP | GS | MPG | FG% | 3P% | FT% | RPG | APG | SPG | BPG | PPG | PIR |
|---|---|---|---|---|---|---|---|---|---|---|---|---|---|
| 2005–06 | Žalgiris | 20 | 3 | 15.7 | .372 | .314 | **.750** | 2.5 | .4 | 1.0 | .0 | 5.4 | 3.4 |
| 2006–07 | Žalgiris | 14 | 14 | 29.9 | .431 | .241 | .653 | **5.0** | 1.6 | **2.4** | **.4** | 12.7 | **12.9** |
| 2007–08 | Žalgiris | 20 | 18 | 26.5 | .469 | .377 | .689 | 3.5 | .7 | 1.5 | .1 | 11.9 | 8.8 |
| 2008–09 | Žalgiris | 10 | 10 | **30.4** | .421 | .411 | .600 | **5.0** | **2.0** | 1.3 | .3 | **14.0** | 12.6 |
| 2009–10 | Milano | 10 | 9 | 24.0 | .398 | .314 | .724 | 3.8 | 1.7 | 1.3 | .0 | 10.2 | 7.9 |
| 2010–11 | Milano | 6 | 5 | 23.2 | **.472** | **.583** | .615 | 3.7 | 1.5 | 1.5 | .3 | 10.8 | 11.5 |
| 2012–13 | Panathinaikos | **29** | **29** | 24.4 | **.472** | .402 | .714 | 4.1 | 1.1 | .8 | .2 | 10.1 | 9.3 |
| 2013–14 | Panathinaikos | 27 | 25 | 23.9 | .412 | .333 | .745 | 4.2 | 1.7 | 1.7 | .0 | 8.1 | 9.6 |
| 2014–15† | Real Madrid | 27 | 7 | 14.0 | .370 | .333 | .724 | 2.4 | 1.0 | .6 | .1 | 3.9 | 4.3 |
| 2015–16 | Real Madrid | 25 | 19 | 17.5 | .469 | .262 | .828 | 1.8 | .9 | .6 | .0 | 4.7 | 3.7 |
| 2016–17 | Real Madrid | **29** | 27 | 16.4 | .558 | .500 | .720 | 2.3 | .8 | .7 | .1 | 6.1 | 7.0 |
| Career | | 188 | 139 | 22.6 | .494 | .346 | .707 | 3.4 | 1.1 | 1.2 | .1 | 8.3 | 8.2 |

=== FIBA Champions League ===
| Year | Team | GP | MPG | FG% | 3P% | FT% | RPG | APG | SPG | BPG | PPG |
|---|---|---|---|---|---|---|---|---|---|---|---|
| 2018–19 | A.E.K. | 17 | 23.9 | .379 | .343 | .732 | 4.9 | 1.4 | .8 | .1 | 8.6 |
