= Gintarė Petronytė =

Lithuanian basketball player (born 1989)

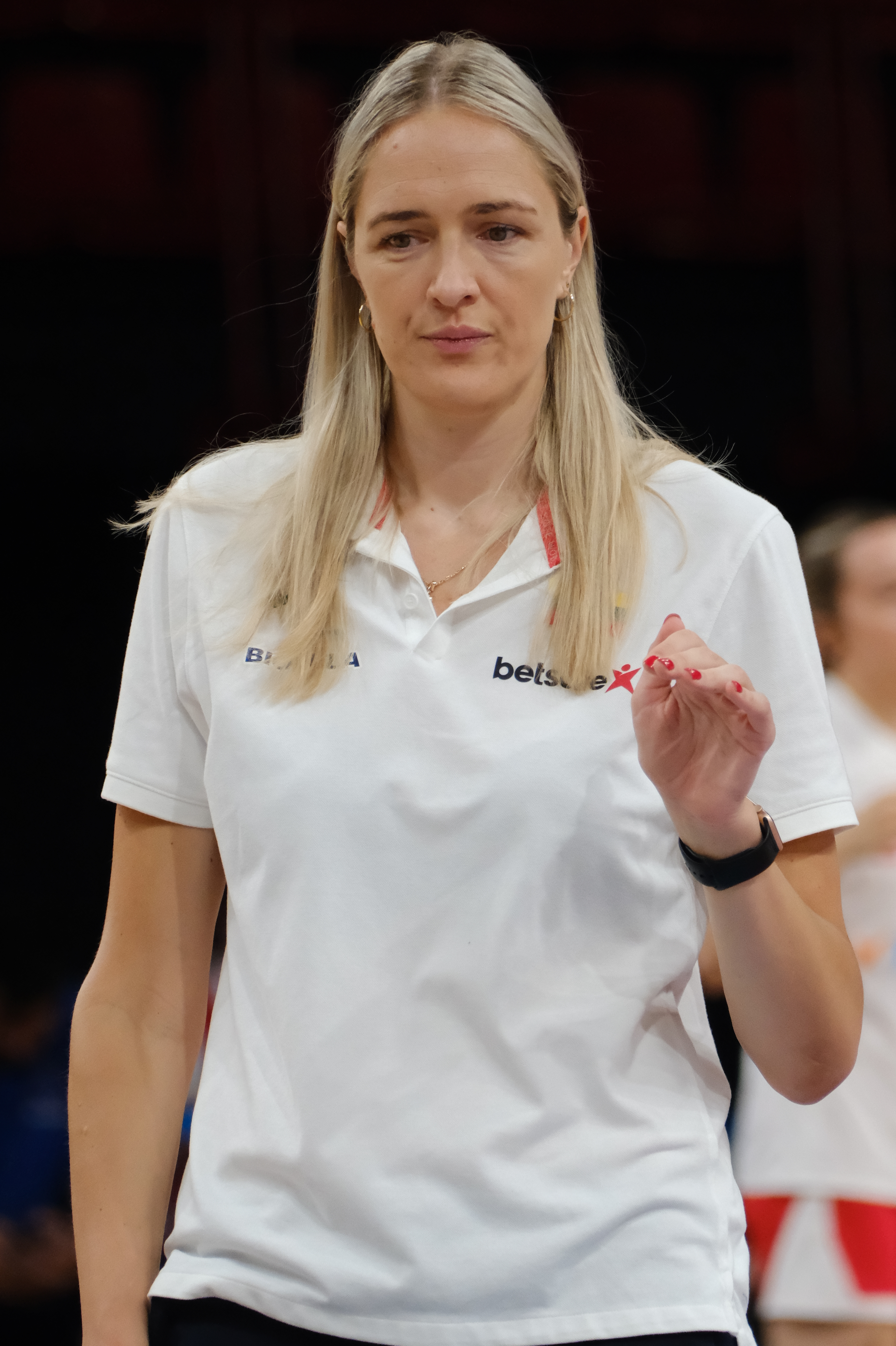
- Petronytė with the Lithuania in 2025

Personal information
- Born: 19 March 1989 (age 37) Kaunas, Lithuania
- Listed height: 6 ft 5 in (1.96 m)

Career information
- Playing career: 2005–2024
- Position: Center

Career history
- 2004–2005: Lietuvos telekomas Vilnius
- 2005–2006: Lintel 118
- 2006–2009: TEO Vilnius
- 2009–2010: Sony Athinaikos Athens
- 2010–2011: Galatasaray Medical Park
- 2011: CCC Polkowice
- 2011–2012: Kibirkštis-Tichė-IKI Vilnius
- 2012–2013: GoldBet Taranto
- 2013–2014: Homend Antakya
- 2014–2015: Wisła Kraków
- 2015–2016: Cases Mapei Napoli
- 2016–2017: Mersin BŞB
- 2017: Homenetmen Beirut
- 2017–2018: Galatasaray
- 2018–2019: Mersin BŞB
- 2019–2022: Reyer Venezia
- 2022–2023: Kibirkštis Vilnius
- 2023–2024: Kayseri

Career highlights
- 2× EuroCup champion (2010, 2018); FIBA Europe Young Women's Player of the Year Award (2008); 7× Lithuanian Women Basketball Player of the Year (2009, 2014–2015, 2019–2021, 2023); 5× LMKL champion (2007–2009, 2012, 2023); A1 Ethniki champion (2010); Greek Cup winner (2010); Turkish Cup winner (2011); BLK champion (2015); WLBL champion (2017); LBF champion (2021)

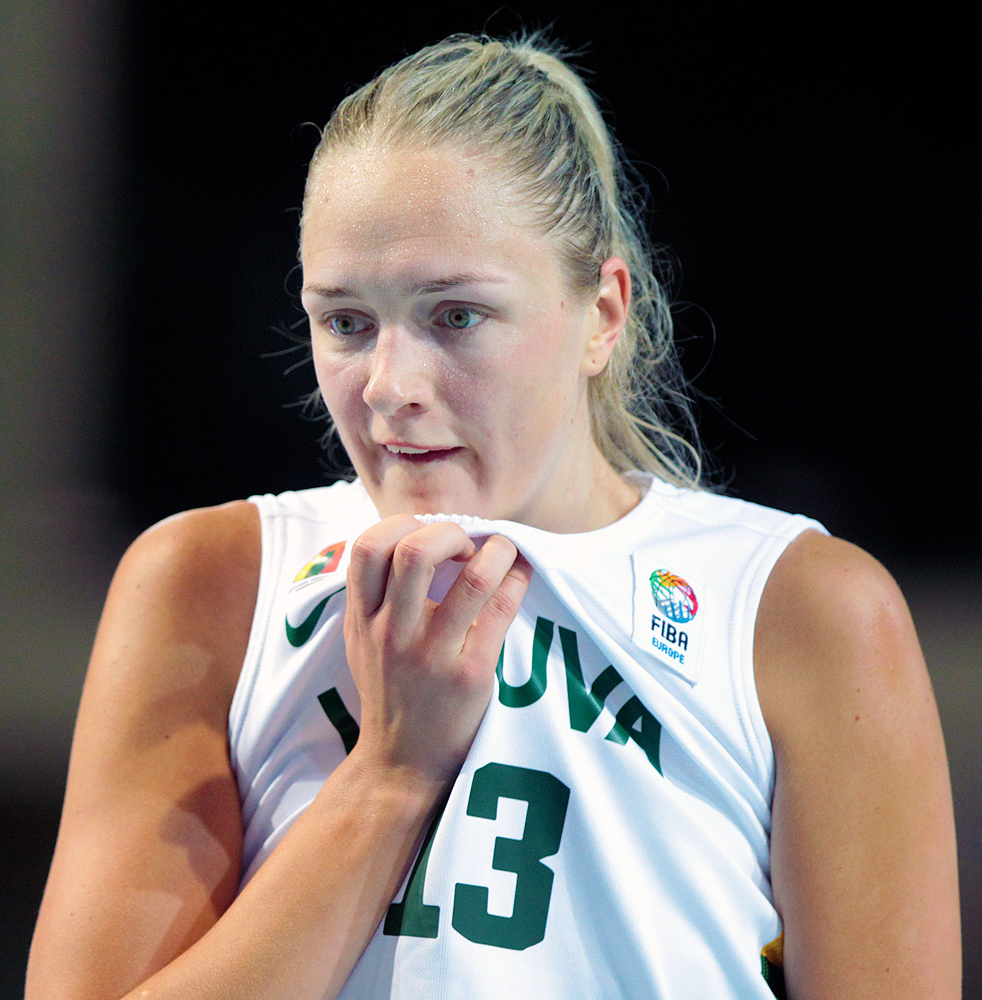
Petronytė with the Lithuania women's national basketball team in 2014

Gintarė Petronytė (born 19 March 1989) is a Lithuanian retired professional female basketball player. As a member of the senior Lithuanian women's national team, she played 158 games, scored 1844 points and participated in 2006 FIBA World Championship and 2015 EuroBasket. She is recognized as one of the best Lithuanian female basketball players of all time.

== Career ==
On 21 July 2010, Galatasaray Medical Park announced that Petronyte had joined the team on a two-year contract.

On 21 March 2024, Petronyte retired from playing professional basketball.

== Honours ==
- 2× EuroCup champion (2010, 2018)
- FIBA Europe Young Women's Player of the Year Award (2008)
- 5× LMKL champion (2007–2009, 2012, 2023)
- A1 Ethniki champion (2010)
- Greek Cup winner (2010)
- Turkish Cup winner (2011)
- BLK champion (2015)
- WLBL champion (2017)
- LBF champion (2021)
