= Women's Baltic Basketball League =

Baltic Women's Basketball League
- Current season, competition or edition: 2025–26 Women's Baltic Basketball League
- Sport: Basketball
- Founded: 19 May 1994; 32 years ago
- First season: 1994–95
- No. of teams: 10
- Country: Estonia; Latvia; Lithuania
- Continent: FIBA Europe
- Most recent champion: (Lithuania) Kibirkštis Vilnius (2024/25)
- Most titles: (Lithuania) Aistės-LSU Kaunas (14 titles)
- Website: womenbbl.com

The Women's Baltic Basketball League (WBBL) is a top-level regional basketball league in Northern Europe. The league features women's teams from Latvia, Lithuania, and Estonia. Teams from Finland, Kazakhstan, Belarus, Poland, Russia, Ukraine, and Sweden have competed in the past seasons.

== History ==
The Baltic Women's Basketball League was founded in 1994. In its 15th season in 2008, the league contained 18 teams from Lithuania, Latvia, Estonia, Ukraine, Belarus, Russia, and Kazakhstan. By 2016, for the league's 26th season, the league had 10 teams from Belarus, Estonia, Poland, Russia, Ukraine and Lithuania. After Russia's invasion of Ukraine, teams from Belarus and Russia were banned from participation.

In 2023, the Lithuanian Basketball Federation took over leadership of the league with the popular online betting company Betsafe, part of Betsson, signing a three year agreement to serve as its title sponsor.

In 2024, it was announced that the league would introduce divisions for the first time with teams from all three of the Baltic States competing.

== Teams ==
2024/2025 teams
Division A	Based in	Division B	Based in
Kibirkštis Vilnius (Lithuania)	Vilnius	Aistės-LSMU Kaunas (Lithuania)	Kaunas
Neptūnas-Amberton Klaipėda (Lithuania)	Klaipėda	MKK Panevėžys (Lithuania)	Panevėžys
LCC International University Klaipėda (Lithuania)	Klaipėda	TTT Rīga Juniors (Latvia)	Riga
TTT Rīga (Latvia)	Riga	Daugavpils University (Latvia)	Daugavpils
TSA/CITYTEED Tallinn (Estonia)	Tallinn	Latvia U16	Riga
Šiauliai-Vilmers (Lithuania)	Šiauliai	Uniclub Bet-Oaks Vilnius (Lithuania)	Vilnius
SBK Liepāja/LSSS (Latvia)	Liepāja	Atletas Kaunas r. (Lithuania)	Kaunas District
RSU Riga (Latvia)	Riga		

== Champions ==
Season	Winners	Score	Runners-up	Final location	MVP	Ref
1994–95	(Lithuania) Telerina, Vilnius		(Lithuania) Victoria, Kaunas			
1995–96	(Lithuania) Laisvė Kaunos		(Lithuania) Vilnius Telekomas			
1996–97	(Lithuania) Laisvė Kaunos		(Lithuania) Vilnius Telekomas			
1997–98	(Latvia) RTU-Klondaika Riga		(Belarus) Horizont Minsk			
1998–99	(Belarus) Horizont Minsk	71–58	(Lithuania) Arvi Veritas	Marijampolė, Lithuania		
1999–00	(Lithuania) Vilnius Telekomas	73–38	(Lithuania) Arvi Veritas	Vilnius, Lithuania		
2000–01	(Lithuania) Vilnius Telekomas	104–75	(Latvia) TTT Riga	Riga, Latvia		
2001–02	(Lithuania) Vilnius Telekomas	76–65	(Russia) Baltiyskaya Zvezda St. Petersburg	Vilnius, Lithuania		
2002–03	(Lithuania) Vilnius Telekomas	92–51	(Finland) Pantterit	Helsinki, Finland		
2003–04	(Lithuania) Vilnius Telekomas	78–60	(Lithuania) Arvi	Druskininkai, Lithuania		
2004–05	(Lithuania) Vilnius Telekomas	95–64	(Lithuania) Lajsve	Vilnius, Lithuania		
2005–06	(Lithuania) Vilnius Telekomas	90–57	(Ukraine) TIM SKUF	Druskininkai, Lithuania	(United States) Katie Douglas	
2006–07	Vilnius TEO	75–66	(Lithuania) Arvi	Druskininkai, Lithuania		
2007–08	Vilnius TEO	59–53	(Latvia) Cēsis	Riga, Latvia	(United States) Willnett Crockett	
2008–09	Vilnius TEO	68–47	(Latvia) Cēsis	Cēsis, Latvia	(United States) Crystal Langhorne	
2009–10	Vilnius TEO	70–56	(Lithuania) Klaipėda	Klaipėda, Lithuania	(United States) (Belarus) Lindsey Harding	
2010–11	(Lithuania) Kaunas VIČI-Aistės	85–72	(Russia) Spartak St. Petersburg	SC A. Sabonis Kaunas, Lithuania	(Lithuania) Aušra Bimbaitė	
2011–12	(Lithuania) Kaunas VIČI-Aistės	79–66	(Belarus) Horizont Minsk	SC Olympia Lida, Belarus	(Lithuania) Tatsiana Likhtarovich	
2012–13	(Belarus) Olimpia Grodno	74–49	(Belarus) Horizont Minsk	Druskininkai, Lithuania	(Belarus) Maryia Papova	
2013–14	(Lithuania) BC Kibirkstis-Tiche	67–57	(Belarus) Horizont Minsk	Mykolas Romeris University Hall Vilnius, Lithuania	(Lithuania) Mantė Kvederavičiūtė	
2014–15	(Belarus) BC Tsmoki-Minsk	63–55	(Latvia) TTT Riga	Olympic Sports Centre, Riga	(Belarus) Viktoryia Hasper	
2015–16	(Lithuania) Marijampolės Sūduva	69–57	(Belarus) BC Tsmoki-Minsk	Marijampolės ŽSM Hall, Marijampolė, Lithuania	(Lithuania) Iveta Salkauske	
2016–17	(Russia) Dynamo-Farm Kursk	70–42	(Estonia) FCR Media/Rapla	Druskininkai, Lithuania	(Russia) Ekaterina Polyashova	
2017–18	(Russia) Inventa-Farm Kursk	65–54	(Belarus) BC Tsmoki-Minsk	Druskininkai, Lithuania	(Russia) Evgeniia Frolkina	
2018–19	(Lithuania) Aistės-LSU Kaunas	69–51	(Latvia) Riga Stradiņš University	Riga, Latvia		
2019–20	Season canceled due to the COVID-19 pandemic with (Latvia) TTT Riga declared winner and (Latvia) BK Liepāja/LSSS declared second					
2020–21	(Latvia) TTT Riga	85–58	(Latvia) BK Liepāja/LSSS	Estonia		
2021–22	(Latvia) TTT Riga	68-62	(Lithuania) Kibirkštis-MRU	Vilnius, Lithuania		
2022–23	(Latvia) TTT Riga	69–68	(Lithuania) Kibirkštis-MRU			
2023–24	(Latvia) TTT Riga	77–66	(Lithuania) LCC International University	Palanga, Lithuania		
2024–25	(Lithuania) Kibirkštis	76–61	(Lithuania) BC Neptunas-Amberton	Riga, Latvia		

=== Division B ===
Season	Winners	Score	Runners-up	Final location	MVP	Ref
2024–25	(Lithuania) MKK Panevėžys	88–78 OT	(Lithuania) Aistės-LSMU Kaunas	Daugavpils, Latvia		
