= Rima Valentienė =

Lithuanian basketball player (born 1978)

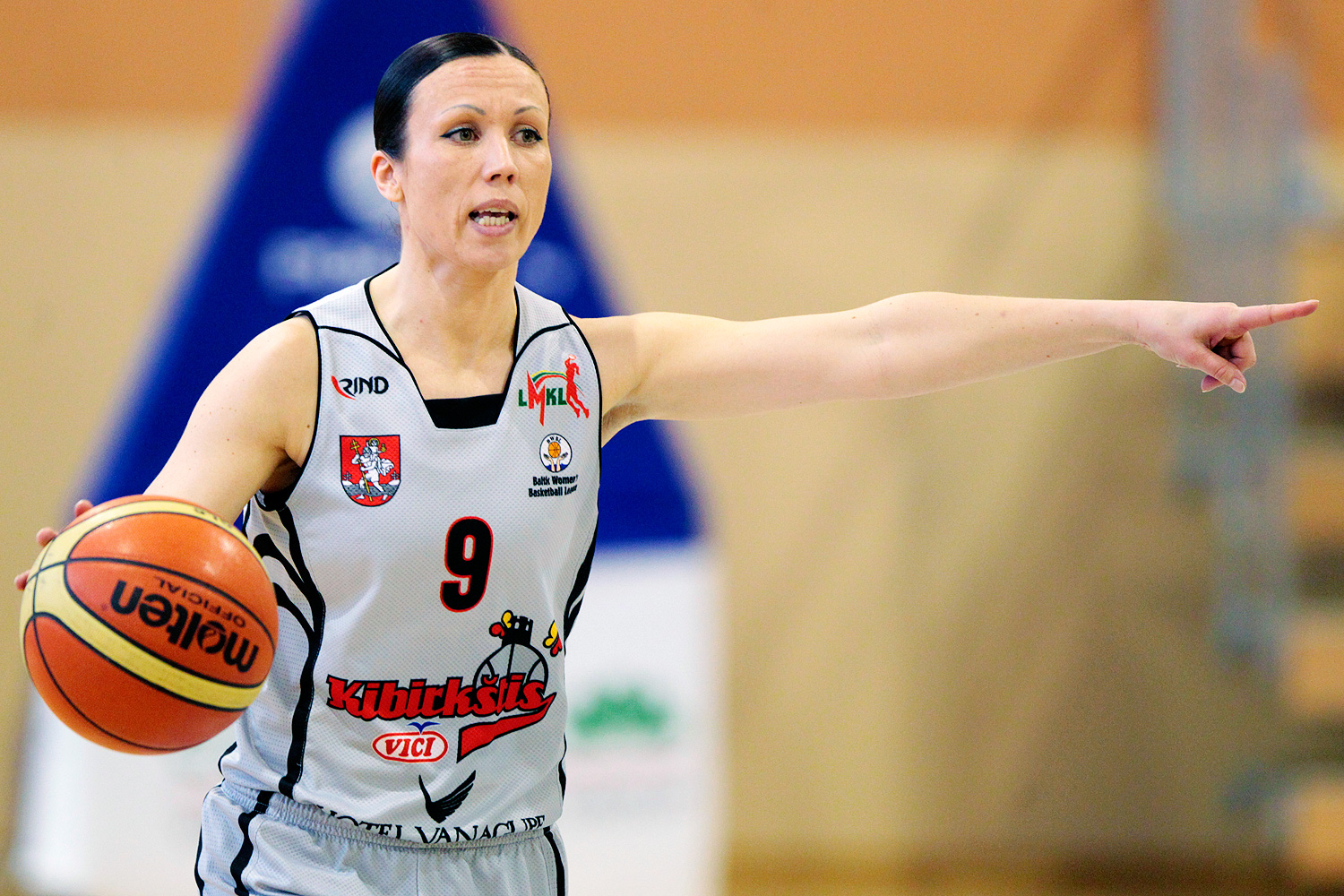

Kauno VIČI-Aistės
- Position: Point guard

Personal information
- Born: June 10, 1978 (age 48) Ukmergė, Lithuanian SSR, Soviet Union
- Listed height: 5 ft 7 in (1.70 m)

Career highlights
- Lithuanian Women Basketball Player of the Year (2011)

Rima Valentienė (born June 10, 1978) is a Lithuanian professional basketball player.

Valentienė plays for Kauno VIČI-Aistės and Lithuania women's national basketball team. She has represented the Lithuanian national team in several EuroBasket Women competitions. Valentienė has spent her entire career playing in Lithuania, except during the 2009-2010 season when she played for the Latvian team SK Cesis.
