= Linas Kleiza =

Lithuanian basketball player and executive (born 1985)

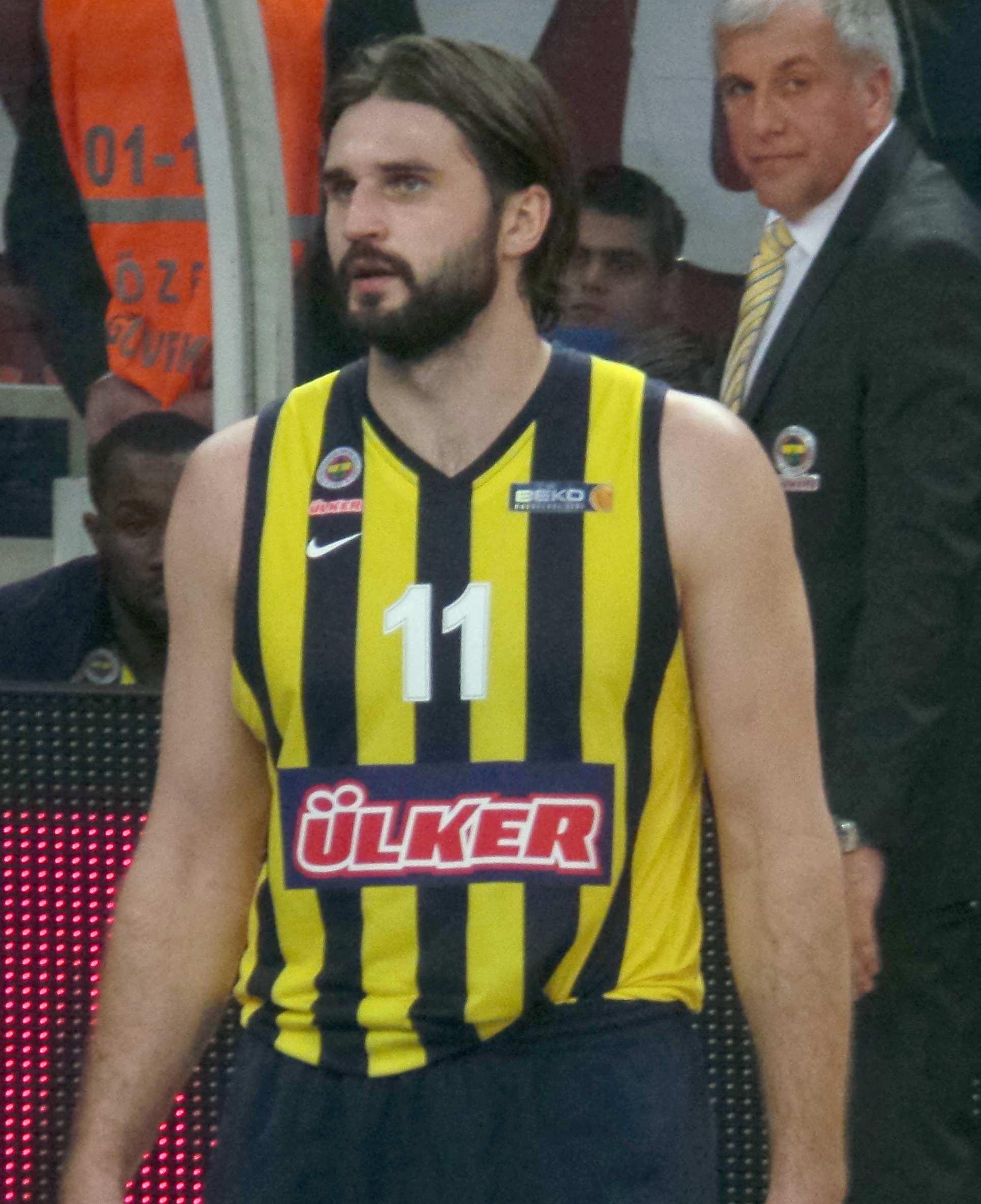
- Kleiza with Fenerbahçe Ülker in 2013

Personal information
- Born: January 3, 1985 (age 41) Kaunas, Lithuanian SSR, Soviet Union
- Listed height: 6 ft 8 in (2.03 m)
- Listed weight: 236 lb (107 kg)

Career information
- High school: Montrose Christian School (Rockville, Maryland)
- College: Missouri (2003–2005)
- NBA draft: 2005: 1st round, 27th overall pick
- Drafted by: Portland Trail Blazers
- Playing career: 2005–2015
- Position: Power forward / small forward
- Number: 43, 11

Career history
- 2005–2009: Denver Nuggets
- 2009–2010: Olympiacos
- 2010–2013: Toronto Raptors
- 2013–2014: Fenerbahçe
- 2014–2015: Olimpia Milano

Career highlights
- All-EuroLeague First Team (2010); Alphonso Ford EuroLeague Top Scorer Trophy (2010); 2× Lithuanian Basketball Player of the Year (2009, 2010); Lithuania Sportsman of the Year (2010); Greek Cup winner (2010); Turkish League champion (2014); Third-team Parade All-American (2003)

Career statistics
- Points: 3,561 (8.7 ppg)
- Rebounds: 1,470 (3.6 rpg)
- Assists: 321 (0.8 apg)
- Stats at NBA.com
- Stats at Basketball Reference
Medals
Men's basketball
Representing Lithuania
FIBA World Cup
Bronze medal – third place	2010 Turkey	National team
FIBA EuroBasket
Silver medal – second place	2013 Slovenia	National Team
Bronze medal – third place	2007 Spain	National Team
FIBA Europe U20 Championship
Bronze medal – third place	2004 Czech Republic	National Team
FIBA U19 World Cup
Silver medal – second place	2003 Greece	National Team

Linas Kleiza (Lithuanian pronunciation: [ˈlʲɪnɐs kʲlʲɛɪ̯ˈzɐ]; born January 3, 1985) is a Lithuanian professional basketball executive and former player. Standing at 6 ft 8 in (2.03 m), he played at the small forward and power forward positions. In 2010, he was the Alphonso Ford EuroLeague Top Scorer Trophy winner and a member of the All-EuroLeague First Team.

Kleiza represented the senior Lithuanian national basketball team in international competitions. He led them to a bronze medal in the 2010 FIBA World Championship, and was chosen to the All-Tournament Team. He also won a silver medal in the EuroBasket 2013, earning an All-EuroBasket Team selection, and a bronze medal in the EuroBasket 2007.

== Early years ==
Kleiza was born in Kaunas, Lithuania. At 16 years old he moved to the United States where he attended Montrose Christian School and graduated in 2003. He played on the Lithuanian Junior National Team that won the silver medal at the 2003 FIBA Under-19 World Cup. He led the tournament in scoring, averaging 29.1 points per game on 58 percent shooting. As a senior, he was named a third-team Parade All-American.

== College career ==
Kleiza played college basketball for the Missouri Tigers. He was named Honorable Mention All-Big 12 by the league coaches as a sophomore. He also earned All-Tournament honors at the 2005 Big 12 tournament after averaging 29.5 points and 9 rebounds per game.

== Professional career ==
=== Denver Nuggets ===
Kleiza was selected by the Portland Trail Blazers with the 27th pick of the 2005 NBA draft. The Trail Blazers then dealt his draft rights, along with Ricky Sanchez to the Denver Nuggets in exchange for Jarrett Jack. Kleiza was seldom used in his rookie season. He averaged 3.5 points and 8.5 minutes per game.

He improved on his three-point shooting in his sophomore year, making 83–221, after only making two three-pointers in his rookie year. He also saw some more time on the court and averaged 7.6 points on 42 percent shooting in 18.8 minutes per game. After the season, Denver picked up their team option on his contract for another season.

Kleiza became a big part of Denver's rotation in the 2007–08 season, mostly backing up Denver's starting small forward Carmelo Anthony. However, he was involved in a lot of trade talks, most notably a trade involving Ron Artest of the Sacramento Kings. On January 17, 2008, Kleiza scored a career high 41 points against the Utah Jazz. His scoring average was up to 11.1 points per game and his shooting percentage was up to 47 percent.

Many expected Kleiza to make a similar leap in production in his fourth year in the league. However, most of his season averages were slightly off from the 2007–08 season. He averaged 9.9 points on 45 percent shooting. His minutes dwindled down in the playoffs. The Nuggets' head coach George Karl, said Kleiza played fewer minutes because he is not a playmaker.

=== Olympiacos ===
On August 10, 2009, Kleiza agreed to a two-year, $12.2 million (€8.6 million euros) gross income contract with the Greek League team Olympiacos. He averaged 17.2 points per game and grabbed 6.4 rebounds per game in the EuroLeague, reaching the EuroLeague Finals with the Reds. Kleiza led the league in scoring, thus winning the Alphonso Ford EuroLeague Top Scorer Trophy, becoming the first Lithuanian to do so. In December 2009, Kleiza was selected the Lithuanian Basketball Player of the Year (2009) for the first time.

=== Toronto Raptors ===
On July 7, 2010, Kleiza terminated his contract with Olympiacos. He was signed by the Toronto Raptors to a four-year, $20 million gross income offer sheet. In December 2010, Kleiza was selected for the second time the Lithuanian Basketball Player of the Year (2010). In January 2011, he suffered a serious meniscal tear in his right knee and was out for the remainder of the 2010–11 season. On February 1, 2011, Kleiza underwent arthroscopic surgery. Kleiza returned to court on January 11, 2012, in a game against the Sacramento Kings. In 14 minutes of game action, he scored 10 points, grabbed 3 rebounds and dished out an assist. On July 16, 2013, the Raptors used the amnesty clause to waive Kleiza.

=== Fenerbahçe Ülker ===
On July 26, 2013, Kleiza signed a two-year contract with Fenerbahçe. On July 1, 2014, he officially parted ways with Fenerbahçe.

=== Olimpia Milano ===
On July 21, 2014, Kleiza signed a one-year deal with the Italian team Olimpia Milano. After the season he withdrew from professionally playing basketball for unlimited period of time due to knee problems, but did not announce his retirement from the sport.

== National team career ==
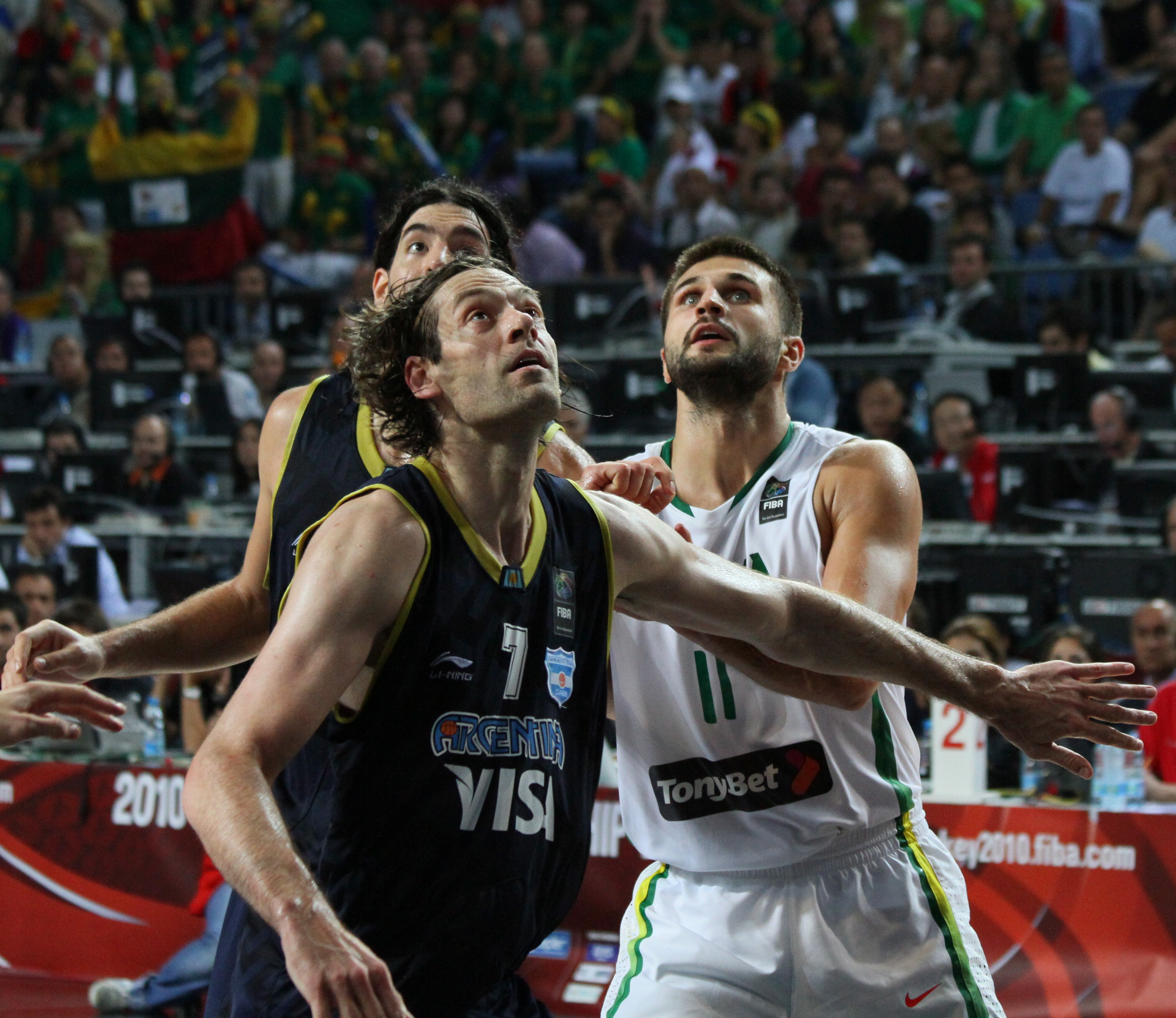
Linas Kleiza (right) with Lithuania national team

Kleiza has also played with the senior men's Lithuanian national basketball team. He played at the 2006 FIBA World Championship and he won the bronze medal at the EuroBasket 2007 and the silver medal at the EuroBasket 2013. He also played with Lithuania at the 2008 Summer Olympics. After a poor performance in EuroBasket 2009, Kleiza led his team to a bronze medal in the 2010 FIBA World Championship, averaging 19.0 points, 7.1 rebounds, and 1.4 assists per game. He was chosen for the All-Tournament Team. Because of his knee injury, he was not able to help Lithuania at EuroBasket 2011.

== Executive career ==
On July 13, 2017, it was announced that Kleiza received part of the BC Rytas shares from Antanas Guoga. He was also named vice president of the club and its sports director. On February 8, 2020, Kleiza announced his decision to leave BC Rytas due to disagreements with other executives of the team. In May 2020, it was announced that Kleiza gave up his shares in the team to other shareholders.

== Personal life ==
Kleiza and his wife, whom he married in June 2014, have one son.

== Awards and accomplishments ==
- FIBA Under-19 World Championship silver medal: 2003
- EuroBasket bronze medal: 2007
- Greek Cup winner: 2010
- Alphonso Ford EuroLeague Top Scorer Trophy: 2010
- All-EuroLeague First Team: 2010
- FIBA World Championship bronze medal: 2010
- FIBA World Championship All-Tournament Team: 2010
- EuroBasket silver medal: 2013
- EuroBasket All-Tournament Team: 2013

== Career statistics ==
Legend
GP	Games played	GS	Games started	MPG	Minutes per game
FG%	Field-goal percentage	3P%	3-point field-goal percentage	FT%	Free-throw percentage
RPG	Rebounds per game	APG	Assists per game	SPG	Steals per game
BPG	Blocks per game	PPG	Points per game	PIR	Performance index rating
**Bold**	Career high

=== NBA ===
*	Led the league

==== Regular season ====
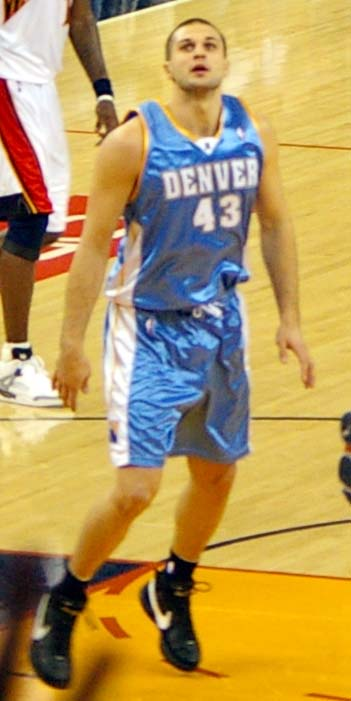
Linas Kleiza in 2007 as a Nuggets member

Year	Team	GP	GS	MPG	FG%	3P%	FT%	RPG	APG	SPG	BPG	PPG
2005–06	Denver	61	2	8.5	.445	.154	.704	1.9	.2	.2	**.2**	3.5
2006–07	Denver	79	14	18.8	.422	**.376**	**.852**	3.4	.6	.4	**.2**	7.6
2007–08	Denver	79	13	23.9	**.472**	.339	.770	4.2	**1.2**	**.6**	**.2**	11.1
2008–09	Denver	**82***	7	22.2	.447	.326	.725	4.0	.8	.4	**.2**	9.9
2010–11	Toronto	39	**23**	**26.5**	.438	.298	.631	**4.5**	1.0	.5	**.2**	**11.2**
2011–12	Toronto	49	3	21.6	.402	.346	.810	4.1	.9	.5	.1	9.7
2012–13	Toronto	20	3	18.8	.333	.303	.842	2.6	.8	.2	.1	7.4
Career		409	65	20.0	.435	.335	.763	3.6	.8	.4	.2	8.7

==== Playoffs ====
Year	Team	GP	GS	MPG	FG%	3P%	FT%	RPG	APG	SPG	BPG	PPG
2006	Denver	3	0	4.7	.375	.000	.000	1.3	.7	.0	.0	2.0
2007	Denver	5	0	13.2	.231	.167	.500	1.6	.4	.0	.0	1.6
2008	Denver	4	**3**	**30.5**	**.537**	.214	.692	**6.5**	**.8**	.3	.0	**14.0**
2009	Denver	**14**	0	15.0	.470	**.425**	**.750**	3.2	.5	**.4**	**.1**	6.9
Career		26	3	15.8	.461	.344	.718	3.2	.5	.2	.0	6.4

=== EuroLeague ===
*	Led the league

Year	Team	GP	GS	MPG	FG%	3P%	FT%	RPG	APG	SPG	BPG	PPG	PIR
2009–10	Olympiacos	22*	**21**	**30.4**	**.480**	.349	.798	**6.5**	**1.3**	**.7**	**.2**	**17.1***	**17.9**
2013–14	Fenerbahçe	**24**	7	21.3	.454	.305	**.918**	3.5	.8	.4	.1	10.1	9.8
2014–15	Milano	**24**	7	19.5	.424	**.352**	.788	3.1	.3	.2	.1	7.3	5.3
Career		70	35	23.5	.459	.339	.838	4.3	.8	.4	.1	11.4	10.8

== State awards ==
- Lithuania: Recipient of the Commander's Cross of the Order for Merits to Lithuania (2007)
- Lithuania: Recipient of the Commander's Cross of the Order of the Lithuanian Grand Duke Gediminas (2010)
- Lithuania: Recipient of the Commander's Grand Cross of the Order for Merits to Lithuania (2013)

== Filmography ==
Year	Title	Role	Notes	Ref
2012	The Other Dream Team	Himself	Documentary about the Lithuania men's national basketball team at the 1992 Summer Olympics.	
2012	Mes už... Lietuvą!	Himself	Documentary about the Lithuania men's national basketball team at the EuroBasket 2011.	
2023	The Captain. Paulius Jankūnas story	Himself	Documentary about Paulius Jankūnas, a long-term captain of the Žalgiris Kaunas.	

== See also ==
- List of European basketball players in the United States
