= Angelė Rupšienė =

Lithuanian basketball player

Personal information
- Born: June 27, 1952 (age 74) Vilnius, Lithuania
- Listed height: 5 ft 6 in (1.68 m)
- Listed weight: 150 lb (68 kg)

Career information
- Playing career: 1968–1984
- Position: Guard

Career history
- ?: Dovana Vilnius
- ?: Kibirkštis Vilnius
Medals
Representing the Soviet Union
Women's basketball
Olympic Games
| Gold medal – first place | 1976 Montreal | National team |
| Gold medal – first place | 1980 Moscow | National team |
FIBA European Championship for Women
| Gold medal – first place | 1972 Bulgaria | National team |
| Gold medal – first place | 1976 France | National team |
| Gold medal – first place | 1978 Poland | National team |
FIBA World Championship for Women
| Gold medal – first place | 1971 Brazil | National team |
| Gold medal – first place | 1975 Columbia | National team |

Angelė Rupšienė (née Jankūnaitė; born 27 June 1952 in Vilnius, Lithuania) is a retired Lithuanian professional basketball player, who most notably played for BC Kibirkštis Vilnius. She won two gold medals in the 1976 Montreal Olympics and 1980 Moscow Olympics, three gold medals during European Championship and two gold medals during World Championship, playing for Soviet Union national basketball team.
