= Vida Beselienė =

Lithuanian basketball player (born 1956)

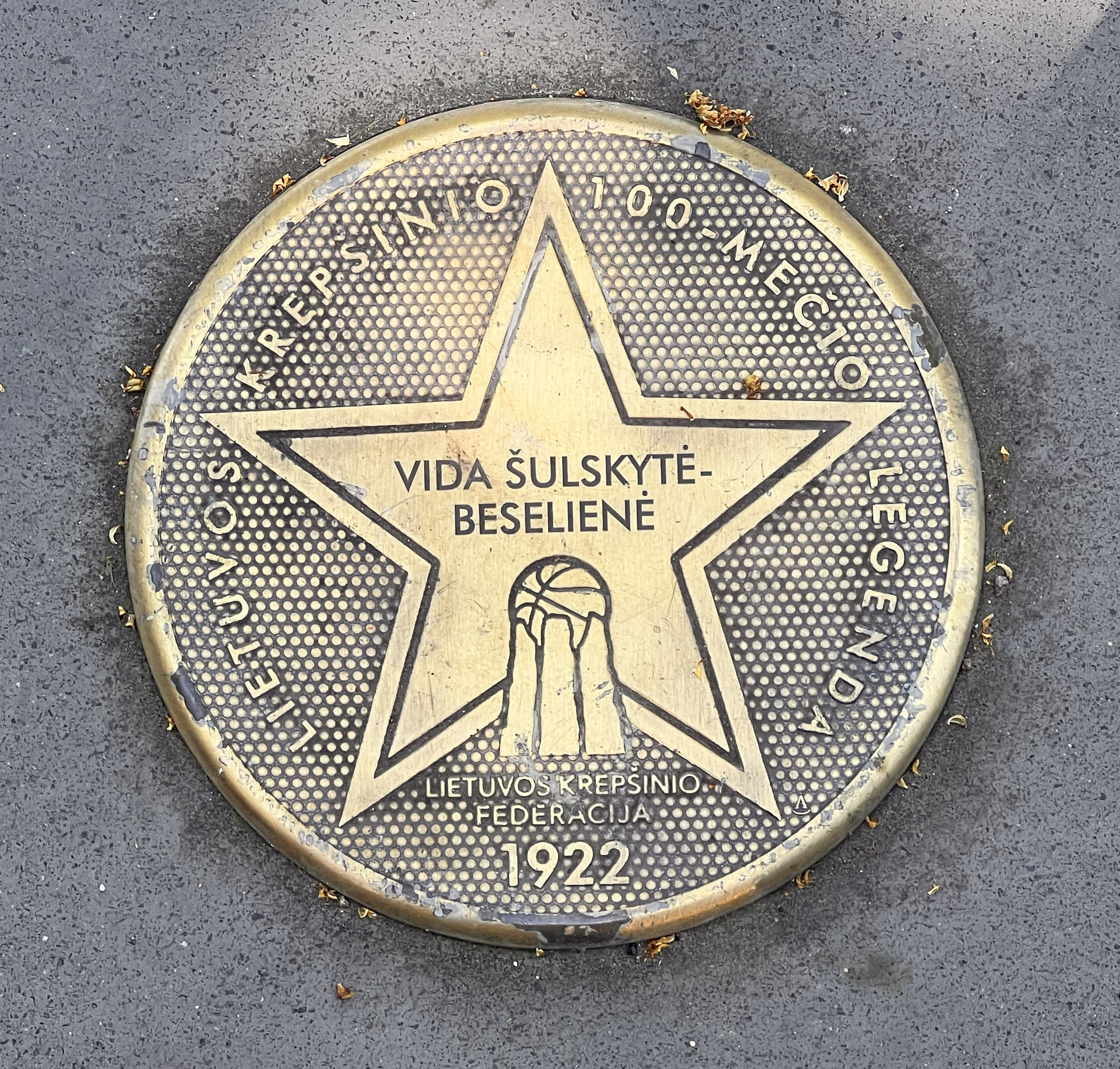
- Star of Vida Šulskytė-Beselienė in the "Basketball Legends' and Fans' Court" in Kaunas, Lithuania

Personal information
- Born: 17 August 1956 (age 70) Šiauliai, Lithuanian SSR, Soviet Union
- Listed height: 190 cm (6 ft 3 in)
- Listed weight: 91 kg (201 lb)
Medals
Women's basketball
Representing the Soviet Union
Olympic Games
Gold medal – first place	1980 Moscow	Team competition

Vida Beselienė (born 17 August 1956) is a Lithuanian former basketball player who competed in the 1980 Summer Olympics.
