= Lithuanian Basketball Federation =

Sports governing body in Lithuania

Lithuanian Basketball Association
- Asociacija „Lietuvos Krepšinis“
- Sport: Basketball
- Jurisdiction: Lithuania
- Abbreviation: ALK
- Founded: 1936; 90 years ago
- Affiliation: FIBA
- Affiliation date: 1936
- Regional affiliation: FIBA Europe
- Headquarters: Santakos g. 11, Kaunas
- President: Rolandas Skaisgirys
- Secretary: Dominykas Domarkas
- Men's coach: Dainius Adomaitis
- Women's coach: Vilius Stanišauskas

Official website
- ltu.basketball
- (Lithuania)

The Lithuanian House of Basketball in Kaunas.

LKF logo with the Columns of Gediminas, used until 2010

The Lithuanian Basketball Federation (Lithuanian: Lietuvos krepšinio federacija), also known as LKF, is a national governing body of basketball in Lithuania. It was founded in 1936, but due to Soviet occupation, the federation disappeared from FIBA. It was reinstated in 1991, following the Independence of Lithuania. In 2011, the famous basketball player, Arvydas Sabonis, was elected as the commissioner of the federation.

== Accomplishments ==
=== Basketball ===
| Age group | Men | Women |
|---|---|---|
| Senior | 1937 EuroBasket; 1939 EuroBasket; 1992 Summer Olympics; 1995 EuroBasket; 1996 Summer Olympics; 2000 Summer Olympics; 2003 EuroBasket; 2007 EuroBasket; 2010 World Championship; 2013 EuroBasket; 2015 EuroBasket | 1938 EuroBasket; 1997 EuroBasket |
| U-20 | 1996 EuroBasket; 2004 EuroBasket; 2005 EuroBasket; 2008 EuroBasket; 2012 EuroBasket; 2016 EuroBasket; 2022 EuroBasket; 2025 EuroBasket | 2025 EuroBasket |
| U-19 | 2003 World Championship; 2011 World Championship; 2013 World Championship | N/A |
| U-18 | 1994 EuroBasket; 2006 EuroBasket; 2008 EuroBasket; 2010 EuroBasket; 2012 EuroBasket; 2015 EuroBasket; 2016 EuroBasket; 2017 EuroBasket | 2008 EuroBasket; 2022 EuroBasket |
| U-17 | 2016 World Championship | N/A |
| U-16 | 2007 EuroBasket; 2008 EuroBasket; 2009 EuroBasket; 2010 EuroBasket; 2015 EuroBasket; 2016 EuroBasket; 2022 EuroBasket; 2025 EuroBasket | 2006 EuroBasket; 2019 EuroBasket |
| University | 2007 Summer Universiade; 2011 Summer Universiade; 2017 Summer Universiade; 2025 Summer Universiade | N/A |

=== 3x3 basketball ===
| Age group | Men | Women |
|---|---|---|
| Senior | 2014 Europe Championships; 2019 Europe Cup; 2021 Europe Cup; 2022 World Cup; 2023 Europe Cup; 2024 Summer Olympics; 2024 Europe Cup; 2025 Europe Cup | 2023 European Games; 2023 Europe Cup |
| U-23 | 2025 World Cup 2026 World Cup | 2023 World Cup |
| U-18 | 2014 Summer Olympics; 2019 Europe Cup 2022 World Cup 2026 Summer Olympics | |
| University | 2025 Summer Universiade | N/A |

== Leagues ==
- LKL: premier men's basketball league (founded in 1993)
- NKL: secondary men's basketball league (founded in 2005)
- RKL: third-tier men's basketball league (founded in 2005)
- LKAL: secondary men's basketball league (founded in 1994, disbanded in 2005)
- LMKL: premier women's basketball league (founded in 1994)
- LSKL: student basketball league (founded in 1998)
- MKL: elementary student basketball league (founded in 2001)

== Presidents ==
- Stanislovas Stonkus (1990–1994)
- Algimantas Pavilonis (1994–2003)
- Vladas Garastas (2003–2011)
- Arvydas Sabonis (2011–2021)
- Vydas Gedvilas (2021–2024)
- Mindaugas Balčiūnas (2024–2026)

== Secretaries General ==
- Saulius Samulevičius (1995–2007)
- Mindaugas Balčiūnas (2007–2013)
- Mindaugas Špokas (2013–2021)
- Mindaugas Balčiūnas (2021–2024)
- Dominykas Domarkas (2024–present)
