= Lithuanian Students Basketball League =

Lithuanian Students Basketball League Lietuvos studentų krepšinio lyga (LSKL)
- Sport: Basketball
- Founded: September, 1998
- Director: Lidija Okuneva
- President: Rimantas Cibauskas
- No. of teams: Men's: 19 (2 divisions); Women's: 6
- Country: Lithuania
- Continent: (European Union) FIBA Europe (Europe)
- Most recent champions: Men's: Vytautas Magnus University; Women's: Mykolas Romeris University
- Broadcaster: SportoTV.lt
- Website: www.lskl.lt

The Lithuanian Students Basketball League (Lithuanian: Lietuvos studentų krepšinio lyga, LSKL) is the Lithuanian men's and women's students basketball league. The league was founded in September, 1998 and currently has two men's divisions with 19 teams and one women's division with 6 teams. Professional basketball players are allowed to compete in the league as well.

== LSKL men's teams ==
=== First men's division ===
School	Titles	Years
Vilnius University	?	?
Vilnius Gediminas Technical University	?	?
Mykolas Romeris University	2	2013, 2014
Lithuanian University of Educational Sciences	?	?
Lithuanian Sports University	?	?
Vytautas Magnus University	11	2012, 2015
Kaunas University of Applied Sciences	?	?
Aleksandras Stulginskis University	?	?
Kaunas University of Technology	?	?
Klaipėda University	?	?
Šiauliai University	?	?

=== Second men's division ===
School	Titles	Years
Vilnius University of Applied Sciences	?	?
ISM University of Management and Economics	?	?
Lithuanian University of Educational Sciences 2	?	?
Vytautas Magnus University 2	?	?
Lithuanian Sports University 2	?	?
Lithuanian University of Health Sciences	?	?
Kaunas University of Technology 2	?	?
Marijampolė College	?	?

== LSKL women's teams ==
School	Titles	Years
Vilnius University	?	?
Mykolas Romeris University	2	2011, 2015
Lithuanian Sports University	?	?
Vytautas Magnus University	?	?
Kaunas University of Technology	?	?
Klaipėda University	?	?
