= Moterų Lietuvos Krepšinio Lyga =

- Sport: Basketball
- Founded: 2002
- No. of teams: 11
- Country: Lithuania; Latvia
- Most recent champion: Kibirkštis Vilnius
- Level on pyramid: 1st tier
- 2026–27 season

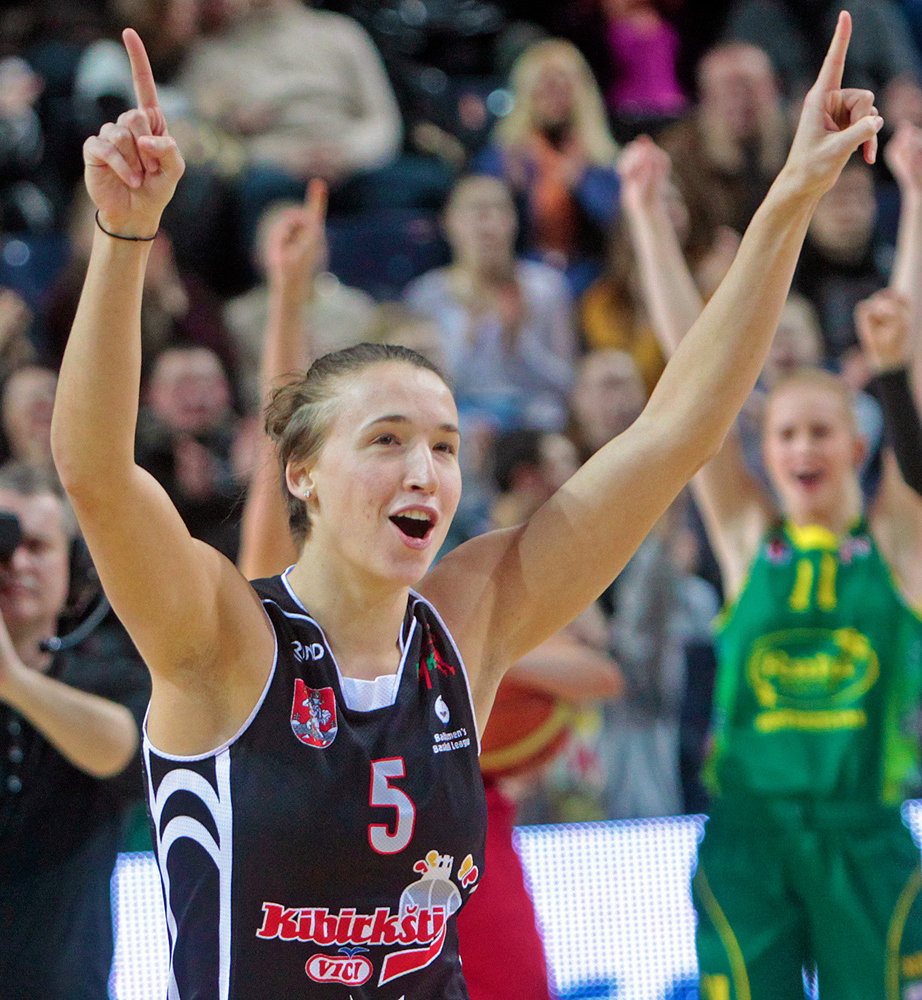
LMKL All-Star Game in 2013

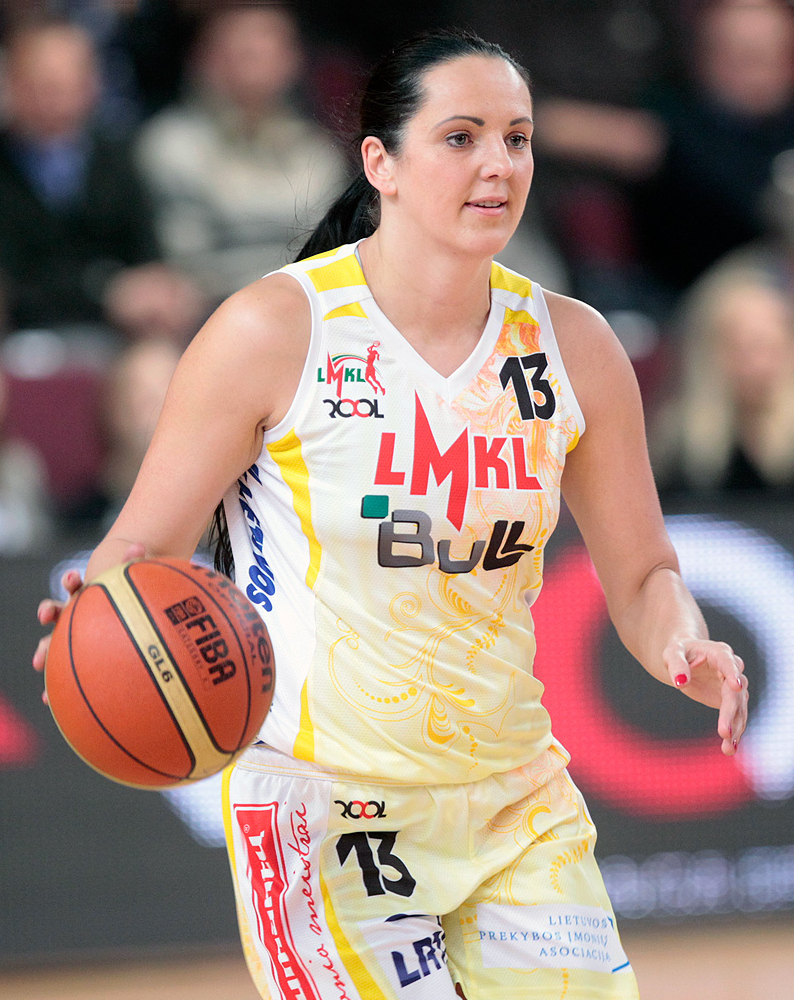
Rasa Žemantauskaitė during the LMKL All-Star Game in 2015.

The Lithuanian Women's Basketball League (Lithuanian: Lietuvos Moterų Krepšinio Lyga) is the premier professional women's club basketball league in Lithuania. It is composed of 11 teams, and it is a member of the Lithuanian Basketball Federation.

== History ==
Lietuvos telekomas/TEO/VIČI-Aistės have won the most championships, with 15.

== League champions ==
- 1989–90 Kibirkštis Vilnius
- 1990–91 Kibirkštis Vilnius
- 1991–92 Kibirkštis Vilnius
- 1992–93 Kibirkštis Vilnius
- 1993–94 LKKI Viktorija Kaunas
- 1994–95 Lietuvos telekomas Vilnius
- 1995–96 Lietuvos telekomas Vilnius
- 1996–97 Laisvė Kaunas
- 1997–98 Laisvė Kaunas
- 1998–99 Laisvė Kaunas
- 1999–00 Lietuvos telekomas Vilnius
- 2000–01 Lietuvos telekomas Vilnius
- 2001–02 Lietuvos telekomas Vilnius
- 2002–03 Lietuvos telekomas Vilnius
- 2003–04 Lietuvos telekomas Vilnius
- 2004–05 Lietuvos telekomas Vilnius
- 2005–06 Lietuvos telekomas Vilnius
- 2006–07 TEO Vilnius
- 2007–08 TEO Vilnius
- 2008–09 TEO Vilnius
- 2009–10 TEO Vilnius
- 2010–11 VIČI–Aistės Kaunas
- 2011–12 VIČI–Aistės Kaunas
- 2012–13 Kibirkštis–VIČI Vilnius
- 2013–14 Kibirkštis–VIČI Vilnius
- 2014–15 BC Utena
- 2015–16 Hoptrans–Sirenos Kauno rajonas
- 2016–17 BC Sudūva Marijampolė
- 2017–18 Hoptrans–Sirenos Kauno rajonas
- 2018–19 Aistės–LSMU Kaunas
- 2019–20 Cancelled
- 2020–21 Kibirkštis-MRU Vilnius
- 2021–22 Kibirkštis-MRU Vilnius
- 2022–23 Kibirkštis Vilnius
- 2023–24 Kibirkštis Vilnius
- 2024–25 Kibirkštis Vilnius
- 2025–26 Kibirkštis Vilnius
