= 2023 FIBA Under-19 Women's Basketball World Cup squads =

This article shows the rosters of all participating teams at the 2023 FIBA Under-19 Women's Basketball World Cup in Spain.

== Group A ==
=== Argentina ===
A 12-player squad was announced on 30 June 2023.

Argentina women's national under-19 basketball team roster
Players
Coaches

Pos.	No.	Name	Age – Date of birth	Height	Club
F	4	Lara Tribouley	19 – 2 January 2004	1.81 m (5 ft 11 in)	Força Lleida CE
C	5	Nerea Lagowski	16 – 8 September 2006	1.95 m (6 ft 5 in)	CAB Estepona
PG	6	Alma Bourgarel	16 – 8 November 2006	1.70 m (5 ft 7 in)	Obras Sanitarias
PG	8	Juana Amaya	17 – 8 September 2005	1.63 m (5 ft 4 in)	Harrods Gath & Chaves
SG	9	Dagmar Hentschel	18 – 2 February 2005	1.73 m (5 ft 8 in)	Obras Sanitarias
PF	11	Karla Sarit	19 – 29 June 2004	1.90 m (6 ft 3 in)	Obras Sanitarias
SG	12	Paula López	18 – 11 June 2005	1.73 m (5 ft 8 in)	Nou Basquet Paterna
PF	13	Malena Maggi	16 – 24 October 2006	1.86 m (6 ft 1 in)	Harrods Gath & Chaves
PG	14	Nicole Tapari	19 – 30 January 2004	1.72 m (5 ft 8 in)	Obras Sanitarias
C	15	Julia Fernández	18 – 14 August 2004	1.85 m (6 ft 1 in)	Ferro Carril Oeste
PF	16	Violeta Maggi	19 – 29 May 2004	1.85 m (6 ft 1 in)	Harrods Gath & Chaves
C	21	Natassja Kolff	18 – 16 September 2004	1.88 m (6 ft 2 in)	Pacífico

Head coach

Sandra Pavón

Assistant coach(es)

Mariano Marcos
Agustín Lukac

=== Australia ===
A 12-player squad was announced on 24 May 2023.

Australia women's national under-19 basketball team roster
Players
Coaches

Pos.	No.	Name	Age – Date of birth	Height	Club
SF	2	Paige Burrows	18 – 9 April 2005	1.68 m (5 ft 6 in)	Basketball Victoria
G	3	Tess Heal	19 – 4 February 2004	1.77 m (5 ft 10 in)	Basketball Victoria
F	4	Saffron Shiels	17 – 18 January 2006	1.88 m (6 ft 2 in)	Centre of Excellence
F	5	Sophie Burrows	18 – 31 December 2004	1.86 m (6 ft 1 in)	Basketball Victoria
G	10	Jayda Clark	17 – 19 July 2005	1.83 m (6 ft 0 in)	Centre of Excellence
G	11	Rubi Gray	18 – 18 March 2005	1.75 m (5 ft 9 in)	Centre of Excellence
F	12	Ruby Vlahov	19 – 5 March 2004	1.90 m (6 ft 3 in)	Western Australia
F	13	Nyadiew Puoch	19 – 23 June 2004	1.90 m (6 ft 3 in)	Centre of Excellence
G	14	Isobel Borlase	18 – 12 September 2004	1.80 m (5 ft 11 in)	Centre of Excellence
C	15	Isla Juffermans	18 – 18 April 2005	1.94 m (6 ft 4 in)	Centre of Excellence
PF	17	Jessica Petrie	18 – 17 May 2005	1.89 m (6 ft 2 in)	Centre of Excellence
F	18	Tayla Brazel	19 – 9 March 2004	1.86 m (6 ft 1 in)	South Australia

Head coach

David Herbert

Assistant coach(es)

Keegan Crawford
Zoe Carr

=== France ===
A 12-player squad was announced on 14 July 2023.

France women's national under-19 basketball team roster
Players
Coaches

Pos.	No.	Name	Age – Date of birth	Height	Club
SF	5	Charlotte Abraham	18 – 4 May 2005	1.83 m (6 ft 0 in)	ESB Villeneuve-d'Ascq
PG	11	Laura Evrard	18 – 24 September 2004	1.65 m (5 ft 5 in)	Landerneau Bretagne Basket
C	13	Cindy Perdriau	18 – 1 October 2004	1.98 m (6 ft 6 in)	Etoile Angers
SF	15	Anaëlle Dutat	19 – 3 July 2004	1.82 m (6 ft 0 in)	Rhode Island Rams
SF	16	Amina Traoré	19 – 6 February 2004	1.88 m (6 ft 2 in)	Basketball South Burgundy Charnay
PG	19	Lisa Cluzeau	19 – 19 January 2004	1.75 m (5 ft 9 in)	USBD Alençon
PG	20	Manoé Cissé	19 – 8 May 2004	1.62 m (5 ft 4 in)	ESB Villeneuve-d'Ascq
SG	23	Daniela Dibanzilua	18 – 13 December 2004	1.72 m (5 ft 8 in)	ASVEL Féminin
C	27	Rosanne Le Seyec	19 – 5 March 2004	1.98 m (6 ft 6 in)	Champagne Basket Féminin
G	28	Fatoumata Touré	19 – 9 February 2004	1.73 m (5 ft 8 in)	AS Monaco Basket
G	42	Leïla Lacan	19 – 2 June 2004	1.81 m (5 ft 11 in)	Etoile Angers
C	99	Jess-Mine Zodia	18 – 22 December 2004	1.90 m (6 ft 3 in)	Tango Bourges Basket

Head coach

Julien Egloff

Assistant coach(es)

Thomas Giorguitti
Priscilla Roger

=== Spain ===
A 12-player squad was announced on 14 July 2023.

Spain women's national under-19 basketball team roster
Players
Coaches

Pos.	No.	Name	Age – Date of birth	Height	Club
PG	4	Iyana Martín	17 – 18 January 2006	1.74 m (5 ft 9 in)	Segle XXI
G	5	Irene Broncano	19 – 26 April 2004	1.83 m (6 ft 0 in)	FC Barcelona Bàsquet
G	6	Elena Buenavida	19 – 8 March 2004	1.77 m (5 ft 10 in)	Valencia Basket
G	7	Marina Aviñoa	19 – 27 April 2004	1.81 m (5 ft 11 in)	Club Joventut Badalona
G	8	Alicia Flórez	19 – 19 April 2004	1.76 m (5 ft 9 in)	Valencia Basket
PG	9	Deva Bermejo	19 – 15 May 2004	1.68 m (5 ft 6 in)	FC Barcelona Bàsquet
C	10	Awa Fam	17 – 17 June 2006	1.93 m (6 ft 4 in)	Valencia Basket
SF	11	Carla Brito	18 – 8 October 2004	1.79 m (5 ft 10 in)	South Florida Bulls
G	13	Inés Noguero	19 – 1 June 2004	1.80 m (5 ft 11 in)	Georgia Tech Yellow Jackets
C	14	Ariadna Termis	18 – 7 July 2005	1.99 m (6 ft 6 in)	Georgia Tech Yellow Jackets
PF	16	Daniela Ikponmwosa	18 – 2 November 2004	1.82 m (6 ft 0 in)	Wichita State Shockers
SF	18	Elena Moreno	19 – 27 January 2004	1.83 m (6 ft 0 in)	Baloncesto Málaga

Head coach

Bernat Canut

Assistant coach(es)

Anna Montañana
David Múñoz

== Group B ==
=== Chinese Taipei ===
A 12-player squad was announced on 15 July 2023.

Chinese Taipei women's national under-19 basketball team roster
Players
Coaches

Pos.	No.	Name	Age – Date of birth	Height	Club
PG	4	Wang Shih-han	18 – 9 October 2004	1.68 m (5 ft 6 in)	Taipei First Girls' High School
G	5	Sung Jui-chen	19 – 3 February 2004	1.60 m (5 ft 3 in)	Shih Hsin University
G	6	Yang Hsing-en	17 – 17 July 2005	1.71 m (5 ft 7 in)	New Taipei Municipal Tam-Shui Vocational High School
G	7	Li En-hsin	18 – 7 July 2005	1.62 m (5 ft 4 in)	New Taipei Municipal Tam-Shui Vocational High School
SF	8	Su Tien-hsin	17 – 29 October 2005	1.73 m (5 ft 8 in)	New Taipei Municipal Tam-Shui Vocational High School
F	9	Chang Chia-hsuan	18 – 6 April 2005	1.77 m (5 ft 10 in)	Private NanShan Senior High School
C	10	Wu Pei-hsuan	18 – 7 May 2005	1.74 m (5 ft 9 in)	Taipei First Girls' High School
C	11	Hsiao Yu-wen	18 – 5 March 2005	1.84 m (6 ft 0 in)	New Taipei Municipal Tam-Shui Vocational High School
F	12	Yu Chin-hua	19 – 23 June 2004	1.82 m (6 ft 0 in)	Shih Hsin University
F	13	Tsai Yu-ting	17 – 6 November 2005	1.77 m (5 ft 10 in)	New Taipei Municipal Tam-Shui Vocational High School
SG	14	Mi Jing-en	16 – 28 September 2006	1.76 m (5 ft 9 in)	Taipei First Girls' High School
C	15	Huang Tzu-yun	17 – 25 October 2005	1.79 m (5 ft 10 in)	Taipei First Girls' High School

Head coach

Chen Mei-Li

Assistant coach(es)

Lan Hao-yu
Yang Ya-hui

=== Germany ===
A 12-player squad was announced on 10 July 2023.

Germany women's national under-19 basketball team roster
Players
Coaches

Pos.	No.	Name	Age – Date of birth	Height	Club
PF	0	Frieda Bühner	19 – 28 May 2004	1.86 m (6 ft 1 in)	GiroLive Panthers Osnabrück
SF	2	Miriam Diala	17 – 19 October 2005	1.82 m (6 ft 0 in)	BasCats USC Heidelberg
PG	3	Nina Horvath	19 – 10 July 2004	1.72 m (5 ft 8 in)	Bender Baskets Grünberg
SF	5	Hilke Feldrappe	19 – 12 April 2004	1.89 m (6 ft 2 in)	Alba Berlin
PG	6	Nicole Brochlitz	19 – 20 January 2004	1.70 m (5 ft 7 in)	TK Hannover
SG	7	Leoni Kreyenfeld	18 – 16 September 2004	1.81 m (5 ft 11 in)	Alba Berlin
SG	9	Anastasia Schlipf	18 – 29 September 2004	1.80 m (5 ft 11 in)	MTV Stuttgart
PF	12	Annika Soltau	18 – 25 March 2005	1.92 m (6 ft 4 in)	Washington Huskies
PG	13	Greta Kröger	18 – 16 July 2004	1.80 m (5 ft 11 in)	BBZ Opladen
PG	19	Marianna Byvatov	17 – 23 September 2005	1.70 m (5 ft 7 in)	SC Rist Wedel
C	20	Paula Huber-Saffer	17 – 12 November 2005	1.92 m (6 ft 4 in)	SC Rist Wedel
PG	22	Paula Spaine	19 – 22 April 2004	1.76 m (5 ft 9 in)	TuS Lichterfelde

Head coach

Stefan Mienack

Assistant coach(es)

Imre Szittya
Constanze Wegner

=== Mali ===
Mali women's national under-19 basketball team roster
Players
Coaches

Pos.	No.	Name	Age – Date of birth	Height	Club
F	2	Kamité Dabou	18 – 9 November 2004	1.79 m (5 ft 10 in)	Stade Malien
PG	4	Fatoumata Sanou	19 – 30 June 2004	1.55 m (5 ft 1 in)
F	5	Sira Thienou	19 – 9 January 2004	1.78 m (5 ft 10 in)	Centre Hirondelle de Baske-ball
PG	6	Bintou Dramé	19 – 20 January 2004	1.71 m (5 ft 7 in)	Djoliba AC
PG	7	Mariam Sarr	17 – 14 December 2005	1.75 m (5 ft 9 in)	AS Real Bamako
PG	8	Badiaran Doumbia	19 – 19 April 2004	1.65 m (5 ft 5 in)	Stade Malien
PG	9	Mariam Traoré	19 – 3 June 2004	1.70 m (5 ft 7 in)	Stade Malien
PF	10	Maimouna Haidara	19 – 2 June 2004	1.87 m (6 ft 2 in)	CB Adareva
F	11	Rokiatou Berthé	17 – 9 June 2006	1.87 m (6 ft 2 in)	Celta de Vigo
C	12	Mama Cissé	18 – 3 September 2004	1.83 m (6 ft 0 in)	KSC
C	13	Fatoumata Samaké	16 – 13 December 2006	1.89 m (6 ft 2 in)	AS Real Bamako
C	15	Oumou Dabo	16 – 23 December 2006	1.91 m (6 ft 3 in)	ASVEL Féminin

Head coach

Sory Diakité

Assistant coach(es)

Abdoulaye Maïga
Aminata Sidibé

=== United States ===
A 12-player squad was announced on 15 May 2023. Aaliyah Del Rosario was replaced by Jadyn Donovan on 29 June 2023

United States women's national under-19 basketball team roster
Players
Coaches

Pos.	No.	Name	Age – Date of birth	Height	Club
G	4	Hannah Hidalgo	18 – 22 February 2005	1.70 m (5 ft 7 in)	Paul VI
G	5	Talana Lepolo	18 – 2 December 2004	1.70 m (5 ft 7 in)	Stanford Cardinal
G	6	Londynn Jones	19 – 30 June 2004	1.68 m (5 ft 6 in)	UCLA Bruins
G	7	Kiki Rice	19 – 14 January 2004	1.80 m (5 ft 11 in)	UCLA Bruins
F	8	Madison Booker	18 – 29 April 2005	1.83 m (6 ft 0 in)	Germantown High School
F	9	Cotie McMahon	19 – 4 May 2004	1.80 m (5 ft 11 in)	Ohio State Buckeyes
G	10	Allie Ziebell	17 – 21 September 2005	1.78 m (5 ft 10 in)	Neenah High School
F	11	Chloe Kitts	18 – 5 August 2004	1.90 m (6 ft 3 in)	South Carolina Gamecocks
F	12	Jadyn Donovan	17 – 31 August 2005	1.83 m (6 ft 0 in)	Sidwell Friends School
F	13	Joyce Edwards	17 – 30 January 2006	1.90 m (6 ft 3 in)	Camden High School
F	14	Grace VanSlooten	19 – 16 June 2004	1.90 m (6 ft 3 in)	Oregon Ducks
F	15	Breya Cunningham	18 – 7 February 2005	1.93 m (6 ft 4 in)	La Jolla Country Day School

Head coach

Joni Taylor

Assistant coach(es)

Teri Moren
DeLisha Milton-Jones

== Group C ==
=== Brazil ===
A 12-player squad was announced on 5 July 2023.

Brazil women's national under-19 basketball team roster
Players
Coaches

Pos.	No.	Name	Age – Date of birth	Height	Club
SG	4	Marcella Prande	18 – 8 January 2005	1.77 m (5 ft 10 in)	Santo André
F	6	Ana Passos	17 – 20 December 2005	1.77 m (5 ft 10 in)	ADC Bradesco
C	8	Sther Ubaka	15 – 12 September 2007	1.81 m (5 ft 11 in)	ADC Bradesco
PG	10	Ana de Oliveira	19 – 29 January 2004	1.67 m (5 ft 6 in)	Ituano Basquete
G	11	Clarice Orange	17 – 9 July 2006	1.80 m (5 ft 11 in)	Dexter Southfield School
PF	12	Alexia Dagba	16 – 4 November 2006	1.83 m (6 ft 0 in)	SESI Araraquara
C	13	Giovanna Rocha	18 – 9 June 2005	1.87 m (6 ft 2 in)	Santo André
C	14	Heloísa Carrera	17 – 17 April 2006	1.93 m (6 ft 4 in)	IMG Academy
PG	15	Mikaelly Luiz	17 – 18 March 2006	1.70 m (5 ft 7 in)	Basquete Catanduva
C	16	Arianny Francisco	17 – 26 August 2005	1.83 m (6 ft 0 in)	ADC Bradesco
C	21	Manuela Alves	17 – 2 January 2006	1.90 m (6 ft 3 in)	Central Pointe Academy
F	55	Taissa Nascimento	17 – 26 December 2005	1.80 m (5 ft 11 in)	Cardinal Newman

Head coach

Adriana Mafra

Assistant coach(es)

Luciana Thomazini
Arthur Brenke

=== Italy ===
A 12-player squad was announced on 12 July 2023.

Italy women's national under-19 basketball team roster
Players
Coaches

Pos.	No.	Name	Age – Date of birth	Height	Club
G	0	Ramona Tomasoni	19 – 11 June 2004	1.72 m (5 ft 8 in)	Brixia Basket
G	2	Eleonora Villa	18 – 9 December 2004	1.68 m (5 ft 6 in)	Basket Costa
G	3	Elena Streri	18 – 29 August 2004	1.67 m (5 ft 6 in)	Futurosa Forna Basket Trieste
PG	5	Vittoria Blasigh	19 – 7 April 2004	1.75 m (5 ft 9 in)	Libertas Sporting Basket School
SF	7	Anita Carraro	18 – 12 August 2004	1.80 m (5 ft 11 in)	Reyer Venezia Mestre
G	8	Beatrice Caloro	19 – 28 March 2004	1.75 m (5 ft 9 in)	Basket Costa
PF	13	Laura Di Stefano	18 – 7 September 2004	1.85 m (6 ft 1 in)	Basket Roma
PF	14	Sara Zanetti	19 – 4 April 2004	1.80 m (5 ft 11 in)	Minibasket Battipaglia
C	15	Kenko Ngamene	19 – 8 February 2004	1.85 m (6 ft 1 in)	Granda College
C	16	Adele Cancelli	18 – 11 December 2004	1.88 m (6 ft 2 in)	Ororosa Basket
C	18	Arianna Arado	19 – 27 June 2004	1.88 m (6 ft 2 in)	Lupe San Martino
C	19	Princess Jakpa	19 – 22 February 2004	1.85 m (6 ft 1 in)	Libertas Moncalieri

Head coach

Luca Andreoli

Assistant coach(es)

Pierangelo Rossi
Susanna Stabile

=== Japan ===
A 12-player squad was announced on 6 July 2023.

Japan women's national under-19 basketball team roster
Players
Coaches

Pos.	No.	Name	Age – Date of birth	Height	Club
PF	2	Milai Mori	19 – 16 April 2004	1.79 m (5 ft 10 in)	Tokyo Haneda Vickies
PG	3	Chinami Yokoyama	19 – 6 April 2004	1.72 m (5 ft 8 in)	Toyota Antelopes
SF	9	Misaki Sasaka	19 – 28 January 2004	1.73 m (5 ft 8 in)	Hakuoh University
C	10	Chihiro Sawa	18 – 2 October 2004	1.78 m (5 ft 10 in)	Mitsubishi Electric Koalas
F	14	Minami Takaki	19 – 16 April 2004	1.74 m (5 ft 9 in)	Hakuoh University
PG	18	Rin Ikeda	18 – 18 December 2004	1.65 m (5 ft 5 in)	Hakuoh University
SG	23	Honoka Morioka	18 – 18 November 2004	1.74 m (5 ft 9 in)	Hitachi High-Technologies Cougars
SF	32	Minami Yabu	18 – 2 October 2004	1.78 m (5 ft 10 in)	Denso Iris
C	33	Reina Segawa	19 – 31 March 2004	1.80 m (5 ft 11 in)	Senshu University
PF	38	Haruka Yamamoto	19 – 8 March 2004	1.77 m (5 ft 10 in)	Ritsumeikan University
PG	77	Nanami Tsuno	18 – 23 November 2004	1.58 m (5 ft 2 in)	Toyota Boshoku Sunshine Rabbits
PF	91	Haru Owaki	19 – 4 March 2004	1.77 m (5 ft 10 in)	Tokyo Healthcare University

Head coach

Natsumi Yabuuchi

Assistant coach(es)

Masato Ogasawara
Hiromi Hirata

=== Lithuania ===
A 12-player squad was announced on 14 July 2023.

Lithuania women's national under-19 basketball team roster
Players
Coaches

Pos.	No.	Name	Age – Date of birth	Height	Club
G	1	Sintija Aukštikalnytė	16 – 18 August 2006	1.75 m (5 ft 9 in)	Biržų SC
G	2	Neda Pliatkutė	19 – 18 February 2004	1.70 m (5 ft 7 in)	Kauno Aistės-LSMU
F	3	Viltė Andrunavičiūtė	19 – 7 April 2004	1.78 m (5 ft 10 in)	Panevėžio Naftėnas
G	4	Justė Jocytė	17 – 19 November 2005	1.88 m (6 ft 2 in)	ASVEL Basket
G	5	Danguolė Pupkevičiūtė	19 – 31 May 2004	1.72 m (5 ft 8 in)	Šiaulių Šiauliai-Vilmers
C	7	Gabrielė Sederevičiūtė	19 – 15 April 2004	1.82 m (6 ft 0 in)	Vilniaus VKM-Kibirkštis-MRU
C	8	Gerda Raulušaitytė	18 – 11 September 2004	1.87 m (6 ft 2 in)	Vilniaus Kibirkštis
F	11	Ugnė Sirtautaitė	18 – 12 October 2004	1.86 m (6 ft 1 in)	Vilniaus Kibirkštis
F	12	Austė Jurevičiūtė	19 – 8 March 2004	1.73 m (5 ft 8 in)	LCC International University
F	14	Ugnė Grigaliūnaitė	18 – 1 December 2004	1.82 m (6 ft 0 in)	Vilniaus VKM-Kibirkštis-MRU
C	21	Erika Kraujelis	18 – 20 January 2005	1.90 m (6 ft 3 in)	Vlado Knašiaus KM
F	23	Rusnė Augustinaitė	19 – 27 January 2004	1.81 m (5 ft 11 in)	Montverde Academy

Head coach

Vilius Stanišauskas

Assistant coach(es)

Nedas Pacevičius
Rima Daunienė

== Group D ==
=== Canada ===
A 12-player squad was announced on 15 July 2023.

Canada women's national under-19 basketball team roster
Players
Coaches

Pos.	No.	Name	Age – Date of birth	Height	Club
G	1	Emma Koabel	18 – 4 October 2004	1.78 m (5 ft 10 in)	Duke Blue Devils
F	4	Marah Dykstra	18 – 9 August 2004	1.88 m (6 ft 2 in)	Montana State Bobcats
F	8	Toby Fournier	17 – 3 October 2005	1.88 m (6 ft 2 in)	Duke Blue Devils
G	10	Cassandre Prosper	18 – 25 June 2005	1.88 m (6 ft 2 in)	Notre Dame Fighting Irish
G	11	Syla Swords	17 – 28 January 2006	1.82 m (6 ft 0 in)	Michigan Wolverines
F	14	Achol Akot	18 – 30 July 2004	1.85 m (6 ft 1 in)	UCF Knights
G	18	Jasmine Bascoe	17 – 9 February 2006	1.67 m (5 ft 6 in)	Villanova Wildcats
F	21	Ajok Madol	18 – 1 June 2005	1.82 m (6 ft 0 in)	Minnesota Golden Gophers
C	23	Jada Bediako	18 – 18 May 2005	1.92 m (6 ft 4 in)	Georgia Tech Yellow Jackets
G	24	Delaney Gibb	17 – 27 August 2005	1.79 m (5 ft 10 in)	BYU Cougars
G	25	Mary-Anna Asare	18 – 10 October 2004	1.71 m (5 ft 7 in)	VCU Rams
G	30	T'yana Todd	19 – 2 April 2004	1.82 m (6 ft 0 in)	Boston College Eagles

Head coach

Carly Clarke

Assistant coach(es)

Marlo Davis
Jessica Roque

=== China ===
China women's national under-19 basketball team roster
Players
Coaches

Pos.	No.	Name	Age – Date of birth	Height	Club
PG	4	Yang Mengping	19 – 12 January 2004	1.66 m (5 ft 5 in)	Fujian Sturgeons
G	6	Chu Huixuan	18 – 3 August 2004	1.78 m (5 ft 10 in)	Guangdong Vermilion Birds
SG	7	Wang Jing	18 – 1 April 2005	1.77 m (5 ft 10 in)	Chongqing Sports Bureau
SF	9	Li Qingyang	17 – 1 September 2005	1.82 m (6 ft 0 in)	Chongqing Sports Bureau
F	10	Li Wenxia	18 – 14 November 2004	1.81 m (5 ft 11 in)	Guangdong Vermilion Birds
C	11	Feng Guoguo	17 – 6 September 2005	1.91 m (6 ft 3 in)	Guangdong Vermilion Birds
F	12	Dou Zhongqiu	18 – 16 February 2005	1.80 m (5 ft 11 in)	Beijing Greatwall
SG	13	Li Jialin	18 – 18 May 2005	1.81 m (5 ft 11 in)	Tsinghua University
C	15	Liu Jiayu	19 – 10 May 2004	1.93 m (6 ft 4 in)	Liaoning
C	17	Zhang Xiao	18 – 19 August 2004	1.97 m (6 ft 6 in)	Beijing Normal University
C	18	Jiang Jiatong	17 – 8 November 2005	1.95 m (6 ft 5 in)	Shanghai Swordfish
G	19	Hu Duoling	18 – 16 March 2005	1.75 m (5 ft 9 in)	Zhejiang Golden Bulls

Head coach

Igor Polenek

Assistant coach(es)

Liu Yang
Li Baijin

=== Czech Republic ===
Czech Republic women's national under-19 basketball team roster
Players
Coaches

Pos.	No.	Name	Age – Date of birth	Height	Club
PG	1	Mariana Přibylová	18 – 14 April 2005	1.75 m (5 ft 9 in)	USK Praha
G	2	Anna Jedličková	19 – 9 March 2004	1.70 m (5 ft 7 in)	BK Brno
SF	3	Dominika Paurová	18 – 22 March 2005	1.83 m (6 ft 0 in)	Oregon State Beavers
PG	4	Anna Brožová	17 – 4 December 2005	1.67 m (5 ft 6 in)	Sokol Hradec Králové
G	6	Charlotte Velichová	19 – 25 April 2004	1.76 m (5 ft 9 in)	Sokol Hradec Králové
C	13	Johana Staňková	19 – 17 February 2004	1.87 m (6 ft 2 in)	Levharti Chomutov
SG	14	Jindřiška Hrubá	18 – 28 November 2004	1.78 m (5 ft 10 in)	Sokol Hradec Králové
G	15	Dominica Hynková	18 – 9 October 2004	1.79 m (5 ft 10 in)	KP Brno
F	22	Emma Čechová	19 – 12 July 2004	1.95 m (6 ft 5 in)	BK Brno
F	23	Luisa Vydrová	19 – 11 July 2004	1.83 m (6 ft 0 in)	SBŠ Ostrava
G	24	Valentýna Kadlecová	19 – 22 May 2004	1.80 m (5 ft 11 in)	Levharti Chomutov
C	25	Nela Nétková	19 – 31 May 2004	1.94 m (6 ft 4 in)	BK Brno

Head coach

Viktor Pruša

Assistant coach(es)

Michal Martišek
Michaela Drtilová

=== Egypt ===
A 12-player squad was announced on 12 July 2023.

Egypt women's national under-19 basketball team roster
Players
Coaches

Pos.	No.	Name	Age – Date of birth	Height	Club
C	00	Jana Sallman	17 – 6 January 2006	1.89 m (6 ft 2 in)	BYU Cougars
G	1	Jana El-Shamy	19 – 19 May 2004	1.75 m (5 ft 9 in)	Gezira
PF	8	Jana El-Alfy	17 – 20 September 2005	1.93 m (6 ft 4 in)	Al Ahly
PF	9	Jayda El-Masry	18 – 26 July 2004	1.84 m (6 ft 0 in)	Al Ahly
SG	12	Judy El-Shebshery	18 – 3 January 2005	1.66 m (5 ft 5 in)	Smouha
PF	15	Jana Ahmed	18 – 11 July 2005	1.82 m (6 ft 0 in)	Al Zohour
PG	22	Sarah Metwally	17 – 1 October 2005	1.62 m (5 ft 4 in)	Sporting
PG	24	Aisha Hassan	17 – 1 June 2006	1.68 m (5 ft 6 in)	Sporting
PG	32	Nour Ebrahim	18 – 21 April 2005	1.74 m (5 ft 9 in)	Smouha
F	33	Tamara Ibrahim	18 – 26 September 2004	1.84 m (6 ft 0 in)	Kangoeroes Mechelen
SG	34	Salma Hassan	16 – 2 August 2006	1.83 m (6 ft 0 in)	Egyptian Shooting Club
C	35	Hana Abdelaal	17 – 30 October 2005	1.82 m (6 ft 0 in)	Sporting

Head coach

Mostafa Hadhood

Assistant coach(es)

Moustafa Fekry
Aliaa Mahmoud
