= 2023 FIBA Under-19 Women's Basketball World Cup =

Copa Mundial de Baloncesto Femenino Sub-19 FIBA 2023

Tournament details
- Host country: Spain
- City: Madrid
- Dates: 15–23 July
- Teams: 16 (from 5 confederations)
- Venues: 3 (in 3 host cities)

Final positions
- Champions: United States (10th title)
- Runners-up: Spain
- Third place: Canada
- Fourth place: France

Tournament statistics
- Games played: 56
- MVP: (Spain) Iyana Martín Carrión
- Top scorer: (Egypt) Jana El-Alfy (21.4 points per game)

Official website
- www.fiba.basketball

The 2023 FIBA Under-19 Women's Basketball World Cup was a tournament organized by FIBA for women's youth national basketball teams aged 19 years old and below. The tournament was held in Madrid, Spain, from 15 to 23 July 2023.

The United States won their third consecutive and tenth overall title, after a finals win over Spain.

== Qualified teams ==
Means of qualification	Dates	Venue	Berths	Qualifiers
Host nation	—N/a		1	Spain
2022 FIBA U18 Women's Americas Championship	13–19 June 2022	(Argentina) Buenos Aires	4	United States; Canada; Argentina; Brazil
2022 FIBA U18 Women's European Championship	6–14 August 2022	(Greece) Heraklion	5	Lithuania; France; Germany; Italy; Czech Republic
2022 FIBA U18 Women's Asian Championship	5–11 September 2022	(India) Bangalore	4	Australia; China; Japan; Chinese Taipei
2022 FIBA U18 Women's African Championship	5–13 August 2022	(Madagascar) Antsirabe	2	Mali; Egypt
Total			16	

== Draw ==
The draw took place in 27 March 2023.

=== Seeding ===
On 20 March 2023, the pots were announced.

Pot 1	Pot 2	Pot 3	Pot 4
United States; Canada; Lithuania; Spain	France; Germany; Italy; Czech Republic	Australia; China; Japan; Chinese Taipei	Argentina; Brazil; Mali; Egypt

== Preliminary round ==
All times are local (UTC+2).

=== Group A ===
Pos	Team	Pld	W	L	PF	PA	PD	Pts
1	Spain (H)	3	3	0	229	162	+67	6
2	France	3	2	1	227	182	+45	5
3	Australia	3	1	2	221	200	+21	4
4	Argentina	3	0	3	122	255	−133	3

Source: FIBA
Rules for classification: 1) Points; 2) Head-to-head results; 3) Points difference; 4) Points scored.
(H) Hosts

15 July 2023
20:15

Boxscore

Spain	83–68	Australia
Scoring by quarter: 22–8, 32–20, 10–22, 19–18
Pts: Martín Carrión 16; Rebs: Fam 9 Asts: Buenavida 6		Pts: Puoch 13; Rebs: Petrie 8 Asts: Borlase 3

Complejo Deportivo Espartales, Alcalá de Henares
Attendance: 677
Referees: Wojciech Liszka (POL), Alan dos Santos (BRA), Edwin Quiles (PUR)

15 July 2023
20:45

Boxscore

Argentina	42–96	France
Scoring by quarter: 9–29, 7–22, 12–33, 14–12
Pts: M. Maggi 12; Rebs: Kolff 4 Asts: three players 2		Pts: Dibanzilua 21; Rebs: Dibanzilua 12; Asts: Evrard 8

Pabellón Jorge Garbajosa, Torrejón de Ardoz
Attendance: 300
Referees: Carlos Peralta (ECU), Andrada Csender (ROU), Carmelo de la Rosa (PUR)

16 July 2023
20:15

Boxscore

France	59–72	Spain
Scoring by quarter: 11–24, 12–20, 19–12, 17–16
Pts: Lacan 10; Rebs: Dutat 10; Asts: Cissé, Lacan 3		Pts: Martín Carrión 18; Rebs: Fam 9 Asts: Buenavida 6

Complejo Deportivo Espartales, Alcalá de Henares
Attendance: 739
Referees: Andris Aunkrogers (LAT), Carmelo de la Rosa (PUR), Edwin Quiles (PUR)

16 July 2023
20:45

Boxscore

Australia	85–45	Argentina
Scoring by quarter: 23–10, 20–14, 26–12, 16–9
Pts: Borlase 26; Rebs: Juffermans 11; Asts: Borlase 6		Pts: López 8 Rebs: Fernández, Kolff 6 Asts: López 3

Pabellón Jorge Garbajosa, Torrejón de Ardoz
Attendance: 739
Referees: Felipe Ibarra (CHI), Song Houlu (CHN), Martin Davison (NZL)

18 July 2023
20:45

Boxscore

Argentina	35–74	Spain
Scoring by quarter: 5–22, 7–11, 15–24, 8–17
Pts: Tapari 8 Rebs: Kolff 10; Asts: Bourgarel, Tapari 2		Pts: Noguero 12; Rebs: Broncano 7 Asts: Martín 5

Complejo Deportivo Espartales, Alcalá de Henares
Attendance: 1,969
Referees: Wojciech Liszka (POL), Lee Ji-youn (KOR), Dorothy Okatch (BOT)

18 July 2023
20:45

Boxscore

Australia	68–72	France
Scoring by quarter: 21–24, 11–18, 19–10, 17–20
Pts: Borlase, Puoch 14; Rebs: Juffermans 13; Asts: Borlase, Heal 4		Pts: Lacan 16; Rebs: Dutat 7 Asts: Cissé 5

Pabellón Jorge Garbajosa, Torrejón de Ardoz
Attendance: 255
Referees: Carlos Peralta (ECU), Andrada Csender (ROU), Saif Al-Dossari (QAT)

=== Group B ===
Pos	Team	Pld	W	L	PF	PA	PD	Pts
1	United States	3	3	0	297	161	+136	6
2	Mali	3	2	1	252	219	+33	5
3	Germany	3	1	2	179	232	−53	4
4	Chinese Taipei	3	0	3	176	262	−86	3

Source: FIBA
Rules for classification: 1) Points; 2) Head-to-head results; 3) Points difference; 4) Points scored.

15 July 2023
17:45

Boxscore

Germany	67–59	Chinese Taipei
Scoring by quarter: 14–20, 19–11, 20–18, 14–10
Pts: Bühner 18; Rebs: Bühner 17; Asts: Horvath 6		Pts: Hsiao 16; Rebs: Hsiao 17; Asts: Hsiao 4

Complejo Deportivo Espartales, Alcalá de Henares
Attendance: 213
Referees: Felipe Ibarra (CHI), Ventsislav Velikov (BUL), Aya Ahmed (EGY)

15 July 2023
18:15

Boxscore

Mali	66–85	United States
Scoring by quarter: 12–26, 19–21, 18–20, 17–18
Pts: Haidara 17; Rebs: Haidara 16; Asts: Sanou 4		Pts: McMahon 15; Rebs: Cunningham 12; Asts: Hidalgo, McMahon 4

Pabellón Jorge Garbajosa, Torrejón de Ardoz
Attendance: 265
Referees: Christine Vuong (CAN), Saif Al-Dossari (QAT), Dorothy Okatch (BOT)

16 July 2023
17:45

Boxscore

Chinese Taipei	68–83	Mali
Scoring by quarter: 22–21, 14–24, 8–18, 24–20
Pts: Hsiao 19; Rebs: Hsiao 14; Asts: Sung 6		Pts: Thienou 20; Rebs: Haidara 15; Asts: Sanou, Thienou 3

Pabellón Jorge Garbajosa, Torrejón de Ardoz
Attendance: 146
Referees: Valentin Oliot (FRA), Lee Ji-youn (KOR), Amel Dahra (FRA)

16 July 2023
18:15

Boxscore

United States	100–46	Germany
Scoring by quarter: 24–11, 21–18, 23–6, 32–11
Pts: Edwards 21; Rebs: Kitts 13; Asts: Lepolo 6		Pts: Bühner 14; Rebs: Bühner 9 Asts: Kreyenfeld 3

Complejo Deportivo Espartales, Alcalá de Henares
Attendance: 336
Referees: Wojciech Liszka (POL), Andrada Csender (ROU), Monicca Nassuuna (UGA)

18 July 2023
18:15

Boxscore

Mali	73–66	Germany
Scoring by quarter: 19–22, 13–10, 14–18, 27–16
Pts: Haidara 16; Rebs: Haidara 13; Asts: Haidara 6		Pts: Bühner 20; Rebs: Bühner 8 Asts: Kroger 8

Pabellón Jorge Garbajosa, Torrejón de Ardoz
Attendance: 330
Referees: Christine Vuong (CAN), Alan dos Santos (BRA), Cecília Tóth (HUN)

18 July 2023
18:15

Boxscore

Chinese Taipei	49–112	United States
Scoring by quarter: 10–27, 10–25, 16–23, 13–37
Pts: Li 8 Rebs: Hsiao 4 Asts: Mi 3		Pts: Edwards 19; Rebs: VanSlooten 9 Asts: McMahon 6

Complejo Deportivo Espartales, Alcalá de Henares
Attendance: 163
Referees: Ventsislav Velikov (BUL), Yana Nikogossyan (KAZ), Aya Ahmed (EGY)

=== Group C ===
Pos	Team	Pld	W	L	PF	PA	PD	Pts
1	Japan	3	3	0	249	207	+42	6
2	Lithuania	3	2	1	233	191	+42	5
3	Italy	3	1	2	221	250	−29	4
4	Brazil	3	0	3	177	232	−55	3

Source: FIBA
Rules for classification: 1) Points; 2) Head-to-head results; 3) Points difference; 4) Points scored.

15 July 2023
11:45

Boxscore

Japan	92–71	Italy
Scoring by quarter: 29–19, 20–16, 30–16, 13–20
Pts: Sasaka 18; Rebs: Sasaka 9 Asts: Ikeda, Owaki 4		Pts: Villa 22; Rebs: Cancelli 10; Asts: Cancelli 5

Pabellón Jorge Garbajosa, Torrejón de Ardoz
Attendance: 91
Referees: Andris Aunkrogers (LAT), Jacquiline Dover (AUS), Amel Dahra (FRA)

15 July 2023
12:15

Boxscore

Lithuania	71–45	Brazil
Scoring by quarter: 21–2, 17–21, 16–12, 17–10
Pts: Jocytė 21; Rebs: Jocytė, Pliatkutė 9 Asts: Jocytė 4		Pts: Rocha da Silva 10; Rebs: Francisco de Oliveira 7 Asts: three players 2

Complejo Deportivo Espartales, Alcalá de Henares
Attendance: 100
Referees: Valentin Oliot (FRA), Yann Davidson (MAD), Yu Yijing (CHN)

16 July 2023
14:15

Boxscore

Brazil	58–77	Japan
Scoring by quarter: 16–17, 9–18, 18–22, 15–20
Pts: Nascimento, Passos da Silva 13; Rebs: Nascimento 13; Asts: Nascimento 5		Pts: three players 13; Rebs: Yamamoto 8 Asts: Owaki 6

Pabellón Jorge Garbajosa, Torrejón de Ardoz
Attendance: 94
Referees: Esperanza Mendoza (ESP), Ventsislav Velikov (BUL), Yu Yijing (CHN)

16 July 2023
14:45

Boxscore

Italy	66–84	Lithuania
Scoring by quarter: 22–21, 14–19, 17–20, 13–24
Pts: Villa 25; Rebs: Caloro, Jakpa 8 Asts: Blasigh, Villa 5		Pts: Andrunavičiūtė 17; Rebs: Raulušaitytė 14; Asts: Pliatkute 5

Complejo Deportivo Espartales, Alcalá de Henares
Attendance: 94
Referees: Carsten Straube (GER), Christine Vuong (CAN), Micaela Prado (ARG)

18 July 2023
14:15

Boxscore

Brazil	74–84	Italy
Scoring by quarter: 16–34, 17–16, 22–19, 19–15
Pts: Nascimento 16; Rebs: Nascimento 9 Asts: De Oliveira 7		Pts: Blasigh 27; Rebs: Arado 7 Asts: Caloro 5

Complejo Deportivo Espartales, Alcalá de Henares
Attendance: 287
Referees: Andris Aunkrogers (LAT), Edwin Quiles (PUR), Monicca Nassuuna (UGA)

18 July 2023
14:15

Boxscore

Japan	80–78	Lithuania
Scoring by quarter: 16–13, 28–28, 21–17, 15–20
Pts: Yabu 23; Rebs: Yabu 6 Asts: Tsuno 7		Pts: Andrunavičiūtė 25; Rebs: Sirtautaitė 7 Asts: Jocytė 6

Pabellón Jorge Garbajosa, Torrejón de Ardoz
Attendance: 132
Referees: Gina Cross (USA), Carmelo de la Rosa (PUR), Micaela Prado (ARG)

=== Group D ===
Pos	Team	Pld	W	L	PF	PA	PD	Pts
1	Canada	3	3	0	249	167	+82	6
2	Czech Republic	3	2	1	239	196	+43	5
3	Egypt	3	1	2	175	259	−84	4
4	China	3	0	3	177	218	−41	3

Source: FIBA
Rules for classification: 1) Points; 2) Head-to-head results; 3) Points difference; 4) Points scored.

15 July 2023
14:15

Boxscore

Egypt	71–103	Czech Republic
Scoring by quarter: 19–30, 19–18, 12–28, 21–27
Pts: El-Alfy 29; Rebs: Sallman 9 Asts: El-Shebshery, Hassan 3		Pts: Paurová 19; Rebs: Hynková, Nétková 6 Asts: Hynková, Kadlecová 5

Pabellón Jorge Garbajosa, Torrejón de Ardoz
Attendance: 95
Referees: Gina Cross (USA), Micaela Prado (ARG), Martin Davison (NZL)

15 July 2023
14:45

Boxscore

Canada	83–62	China
Scoring by quarter: 23–18, 16–10, 20–18, 24–16
Pts: Gibb, Swords 17; Rebs: Fournier 14; Asts: Bascoe 4		Pts: Hu 15; Rebs: Li Q., Li W. 7 Asts: Chu 6

Complejo Deportivo Espartales, Alcalá de Henares
Attendance: 111
Referees: Esperanza Mendoza (ESP), Carsten Straube (GER), Yana Nikogossyan (KAZ)

16 July 2023
11:45

Boxscore

China	56–60	Egypt
Scoring by quarter: 27–5, 17–15, 8–20, 4–20
Pts: Hu 21; Rebs: Li Q. 15; Asts: Yang 5		Pts: El-Alfy 15; Rebs: El-Alfy 11; Asts: Hassan 4

Pabellón Jorge Garbajosa, Torrejón de Ardoz
Attendance: 86
Referees: Gina Cross (USA), Saif Al-Dossari (QAT), Jacquiline Dover (AUS)

16 July 2023
12:15

Boxscore

Czech Republic	61–66	Canada
Scoring by quarter: 8–31, 17–9, 19–7, 17–19
Pts: Brožová 10; Rebs: Čechová 12; Asts: Brožová 2		Pts: Prosper 21; Rebs: Fournier 17; Asts: Dykstra 3

Complejo Deportivo Espartales, Alcalá de Henares
Attendance: 81
Referees: Carlos Peralta (ECU), Alan dos Santos (BRA), Cecília Tóth (HUN)

18 July 2023
11:45

Boxscore

China	59–75	Czech Republic
Scoring by quarter: 18–20, 15–15, 17–19, 9–21
Pts: Hu 18; Rebs: Zhang 7 Asts: Yang 3		Pts: Paurová 20; Rebs: Čechová 11; Asts: Velichová 7

Complejo Deportivo Espartales, Alcalá de Henares
Attendance: 244
Referees: Esperanza Mendoza (ESP), Valentin Oliot (FRA), Yann Davidson (MAD)

18 July 2023
11:45

Boxscore

Egypt	44–100	Canada
Scoring by quarter: 8–20, 9–31, 12–26, 15–23
Pts: El-Alfy 20; Rebs: Ahmed 10; Asts: Hassan 4		Pts: Swords 22; Rebs: Fournier 15; Asts: Boscoe 6

Pabellón Jorge Garbajosa, Torrejón de Ardoz
Attendance: 67
Referees: Carsten Straube (GER), Jacquiline Dover (AUS), Amel Dahra (FRA)

== Knockout stage ==
=== Bracket ===
Round of 16
19 July
Spain	93
Chinese Taipei	65
19 July
Lithuania	86
Egypt	64
19 July
Australia	67
Mali	74
19 July
Brazil	45
Canada	89
19 July
France	63
Germany	60
19 July
Japan	75
China	58
19 July
Argentina	36
United States	112
19 July
Italy	84
Czech Republic	92

Quarter-finals
21 July
Spain	67
Lithuania	49
21 July
Mali	69
Canada	82
21 July
France (OT)	80
Japan	78
21 July
United States	121
Czech Republic	61

Semi-finals
22 July
Spain	77
Canada	70
22 July
France	57
United States	80

Final
23 July
Spain	66
United States	69
Third place
23 July
Canada (OT)	80
France	73

5–8th place bracket

5–8th place semifinals
22 July
Lithuania	53
Mali	56
22 July
Japan	67
Czech Republic	51

Fifth place
23 July
Mali	73
Japan	61
Seventh place
23 July
Lithuania	50
Czech Republic	76

9–16th place bracket

9–16th place quarterfinals
21 July
Chinese Taipei	79
Egypt	83
21 July
Australia	91
Brazil	60
21 July
Germany	76
China	63
21 July
Argentina	68
Italy	71

9–12th place semifinals
22 July
Egypt	45
Australia	70
22 July
Germany	81
Italy	57

Ninth place
23 July
Australia	81
Germany	73
Eleventh place
23 July
Egypt	56
Italy	64

13–16th place bracket

13–16th place semifinals
22 July
Chinese Taipei	59
Brazil	82
22 July
China	76
Argentina	53

13th place
23 July
Brazil	62
China	76
15th place
23 July
Chinese Taipei (OT)	79
Argentina	72

=== Round of 16 ===
19 July 2023
11:45

Boxscore

Italy	84–92	Czech Republic
Scoring by quarter: 17–23, 19–29, 21–22, 27–18
Pts: Villa 26; Rebs: Di Stefano 9 Asts: Blasigh 6		Pts: Kadlecová 26; Rebs: Čechová 9 Asts: Brožová 9

Pabellón Jorge Garbajosa, Torrejón de Ardoz
Attendance: 87
Referees: Esperanza Mendoza (ESP), Lee Ji-youn (KOR), Amel Dahra (FRA)

19 July 2023
12:15

Boxscore

Lithuania	86–64	Egypt
Scoring by quarter: 18–24, 22–13, 28–13, 18–14
Pts: Sirtautaitė 19; Rebs: Raulušaitytė 7 Asts: Pliatkutė 5		Pts: El-Alfy 28; Rebs: El-Alfy 13; Asts: Hassan 5

Complejo Deportivo Espartales, Alcalá de Henares
Attendance: 188
Referees: Christine Vuong (CAN), Alan dos Santos (BRA), Yann Davidson (MAD)

19 July 2023
14:15

Boxscore

Japan	75–58	China
Scoring by quarter: 27–19, 15–19, 17–7, 16–13
Pts: Owaki 18; Rebs: Morioka, Owaki 10; Asts: Morioka 9		Pts: Chu 15; Rebs: three players 9 Asts: Chu, Li Q. 4

Pabellón Jorge Garbajosa, Torrejón de Ardoz
Attendance: 198
Referees: Andris Aunkrogers (LAT), Cecília Tóth (HUN), Edwin Quiles (PUR)

19 July 2023
14:45

Boxscore

Brazil	45–89	Canada
Scoring by quarter: 13–13, 15–33, 8–26, 9–17
Pts: Alves, Passos da Silva 8 Rebs: Rocha da Silva 10; Asts: De Oliveira 4		Pts: Fournier 22; Rebs: Fournier 12; Asts: Bascoe 4

Complejo Deportivo Espartales, Alcalá de Henares
Attendance: 93
Referees: Carlos Peralta (ECU), Carmelo de la Rosa (PUR), Yana Nikogossyan (KAZ)

19 July 2023
17:45

Boxscore

Australia	67–74	Mali
Scoring by quarter: 20–17, 16–21, 18–21, 13–15
Pts: Pouch 21; Rebs: Burrows 10; Asts: Brazel 5		Pts: Haidara 20; Rebs: Haidara 11; Asts: Traoré 5

Complejo Deportivo Espartales, Alcalá de Henares
Attendance: 232
Referees: Wojciech Liszka (POL), Micaela Prado (ARG), Martin Davison (NZL)

19 July 2023
18:15

Boxscore

France	63–60	Germany
Scoring by quarter: 9–18, 17–15, 14–15, 23–12
Pts: Lacan 16; Rebs: Dutat 16; Asts: Lacan 4		Pts: Soltau 15; Rebs: Bühner 11; Asts: Soltau 3

Pabellón Jorge Garbajosa, Torrejón de Ardoz
Attendance: 278
Referees: Gina Cross (USA), Ventsislav Velikov (BUL), Jacquiline Dover (AUS)

19 July 2023
20:15

Boxscore

Argentina	36–112	United States
Scoring by quarter: 6–27, 8–29, 13–30, 9–26
Pts: Kolff 9 Rebs: Amaya 7 Asts: Bourgarel, Hentschel 2		Pts: Zibell 20; Rebs: Kitts 9 Asts: Hidalgo 5

Complejo Deportivo Espartales, Alcalá de Henares
Attendance: 232
Referees: Carsten Straube (GER), Yu Yijing (CHN), Song Houlu (CHN)

19 July 2023
20:45

Boxscore

Spain	93–65	Chinese Taipei
Scoring by quarter: 29–21, 17–16, 21–15, 26–13
Pts: Brito 19; Rebs: Fam 10; Asts: Buenavida 11		Pts: Li 15; Rebs: Yu 7 Asts: Li 4

Pabellón Jorge Garbajosa, Torrejón de Ardoz
Attendance: 1,222
Referees: Valentin Oliot (FRA), Felipe Ibarra (CHI), Monicca Nassuuna (UGA)

=== 9–16th place quarterfinals ===
21 July 2023
12:30

Boxscore

Chinese Taipei	79–83	Egypt
Scoring by quarter: 23–23, 24–9, 21–24, 11–27
Pts: Hsiao, Mi 18; Rebs: Hsiao 7 Asts: Sung 6		Pts: El-Alfy 38; Rebs: El-Alfy 18; Asts: Ibrahim 6

Complejo Deportivo Espartales, Alcalá de Henares
Attendance: 19
Referees: Esperanza Mendoza (ESP), Saif Al-Dossari (QAT), Martin Davison (NZL)

21 July 2023
15:00

Boxscore

Australia	91–60	Brazil
Scoring by quarter: 28–19, 24–18, 16–14, 23–9
Pts: Puoch 16; Rebs: Borlase, Clark 5 Asts: Heal 5		Pts: Rocha da Silva 19; Rebs: Carrera 6 Asts: Paula de Olivera, Nascimento 5

Complejo Deportivo Espartales, Alcalá de Henares
Attendance: 0
Referees: Valentin Oliot (FRA), Micaela Prado (ARG), Andrada Csender (ROU)

21 July 2023
18:00

Boxscore

Germany	76–63	China
Scoring by quarter: 25–16, 13–12, 17–19, 21–16
Pts: Soltau 25; Rebs: Bühner 12; Asts: three players 3		Pts: Li W. 17; Rebs: Li Q. 9 Asts: Chu, Li Q. 5

Complejo Deportivo Espartales, Alcalá de Henares
Attendance: 66
Referees: Felipe Ibarra (CHI), Edwin Quiles (PUR), Aya Ahmed (EGY)

21 July 2023
20:30

Boxscore

Argentina	68–71 (OT)	Italy
Scoring by quarter: 15–14, 10–18, 18–19, 7–7, Overtime: 3–6
Pts: Bourgarel 19; Rebs: Fernández 13; Asts: Bourgarel 5		Pts: Blasigh, Villa 18; Rebs: Caloro 13; Asts: Blasigh, Villa 4

Complejo Deportivo Espartales, Alcalá de Henares
Attendance: 111
Referees: Ventsislav Velikov (BUL), Yann Davidson (MAD), Dorothy Okatch (BOT)

=== Quarterfinals ===
21 July 2023
13:00

Boxscore

France	80–78 (OT)	Japan
Scoring by quarter: 12–11, 21–18, 22–20, 14–20, Overtime: 11–9
Pts: Lacan 36; Rebs: Dutat 18; Asts: Touré 6		Pts: Owaki 23; Rebs: Morioka, Yabu 7 Asts: Tsuno 10

Palacio de Deportes de la Comunidad de Madrid, Madrid
Attendance: 296
Referees: Andris Aunkrogers (LAT), Christine Vuong (CAN), Alan dos Santos (BRA)

21 July 2023
15:30

Boxscore

United States	121–61	Czech Republic
Scoring by quarter: 35–13, 27–12, 27–24, 32–12
Pts: Edwards 23; Rebs: Cunningham 11; Asts: Hidalgo 13		Pts: Paurová 16; Rebs: Čechová 7 Asts: Paurová 3

Palacio de Deportes de la Comunidad de Madrid, Madrid
Attendance: 426
Referees: Carsten Straube (GER), Lee Ji-youn (KOR), Cecília Tóth (HUN)

21 July 2023
18:30

Boxscore

Mali	69–82	Canada
Scoring by quarter: 13–18, 17–26, 23–15, 16–23
Pts: Thienou 20; Rebs: Haidara 10; Asts: Sanou 8		Pts: Prosper 22; Rebs: Fournier 23; Asts: Prosper 5

Palacio de Deportes de la Comunidad de Madrid, Madrid
Attendance: 700
Referees: Gina Cross (USA), Carlos Peralta (ECU), Amel Dahra (FRA)

21 July 2023
21:00

Boxscore

Spain	67–49	Lithuania
Scoring by quarter: 19–7, 16–13, 16–13, 16–16
Pts: Martín Carrión 18; Rebs: Fam 11; Asts: three players 5		Pts: Raulušaitytė 14; Rebs: Raulušaitytė 9 Asts: Augustinaite 3

Palacio de Deportes de la Comunidad de Madrid, Madrid
Attendance: 2,532
Referees: Wojciech Liszka (POL), Carmelo de la Rosa (PUR), Jacquiline Dover (AUS)

=== 13–16th place semifinals ===
22 July 2023
10:00

Boxscore

Chinese Taipei	59–82	Brazil
Scoring by quarter: 12–17, 18–31, 15–17, 14–17
Pts: Hsiao 16; Rebs: Hsiao 7 Asts: Mi 6		Pts: Rocha da Silva 17; Rebs: Rocha da Silva 11; Asts: De Oliveira 7

Complejo Deportivo Espartales, Alcalá de Henares
Attendance: 42
Referees: Andrada Csender (ROU), Yann Davidson (MAD), Yana Nikogossyan (KAZ)

22 July 2023
12:30

Boxscore

China	76–53	Argentina
Scoring by quarter: 25–13, 23–10, 13–20, 15–10
Pts: Li W. 22; Rebs: Zhang 12; Asts: Li W. 9		Pts: Kolff 16; Rebs: Fernández 9 Asts: Amaya, Maggi 3

Complejo Deportivo Espartales, Alcalá de Henares
Attendance: 40
Referees: Esperanza Mendoza (ESP), Saif Al-Dossari (QAT), Jacquiline Dover (AUS)

=== 9–12th place semifinals ===
22 July 2023
15:30

Boxscore

Egypt	45–70	Australia
Scoring by quarter: 15–15, 11–27, 9–17, 10–11
Pts: Sallman 15; Rebs: El-Alfy 9 Asts: three players 2		Pts: Borlase 17; Rebs: Juffermans 10; Asts: Borlase 4

Complejo Deportivo Espartales, Alcalá de Henares
Attendance: 47
Referees: Felipe Ibarra (CHI), Lee Ji-youn (KOR), Yu Yijing (CHN)

22 July 2023
18:00

Boxscore

Germany	81–57	Italy
Scoring by quarter: 26–16, 24–14, 16–14, 15–13
Pts: Bühner 14; Rebs: Bühner 10; Asts: Bühner 5		Pts: Caloro 12; Rebs: Tomasoni 6 Asts: Caloro 8

Complejo Deportivo Espartales, Alcalá de Henares
Attendance: 110
Referees: Valentin Oliot (FRA), Monicca Nassuuna (UGA), Martin Davison (NZL)

=== 5–8th place semifinals ===
22 July 2023
10:30

Boxscore

Japan	67–51	Czech Republic
Scoring by quarter: 26–9, 12–16, 15–13, 14–13
Pts: Morioka 15; Rebs: Tsuno 11; Asts: Ikeda 4		Pts: Paurová 20; Rebs: Paurová 14; Asts: Kadlecová 3

Palacio de Deportes de la Comunidad de Madrid, Madrid
Attendance: 123
Referees: Gina Cross (USA), Amel Dahra (FRA), Carmelo de la Rosa (PUR)

22 July 2023
13:00

Boxscore

Lithuania	53–56	Mali
Scoring by quarter: 11–15, 13–22, 11–9, 18–10
Pts: Pliatkutė 17; Rebs: Raulušaitytė 13; Asts: Pupkevičiūtė, Raulušaitytė 5		Pts: Thienou 19; Rebs: Haidara 17; Asts: Sanou 3

Palacio de Deportes de la Comunidad de Madrid, Madrid
Attendance: 211
Referees: Carlos Peralta (ECU), Christine Vuong (CAN), Edwin Quiles (PUR)

=== Semifinals ===
22 July 2023
18:30

Boxscore

France	57–80	United States
Scoring by quarter: 20–20, 10–28, 13–17, 14–15
Pts: Touré 16; Rebs: Dutat 13; Asts: Lacan 5		Pts: Rice, VanSlooten 13; Rebs: Edwards 9 Asts: Lepolo 5

Palacio de Deportes de la Comunidad de Madrid, Madrid
Attendance: 1,580
Referees: Wojciech Liszka (POL), Ventsislav Velikov (BUL), Carsten Straube (GER)

22 July 2023
21:00

Boxscore

Spain	77–70	Canada
Scoring by quarter: 26-22, 14-14, 18-11, 19-23
Pts: Martín Carrión 24; Rebs: Fam 8 Asts: Carrion 5		Pts: Fournier 20; Rebs: Fournier 7 Asts: Dykstra 3

Palacio de Deportes de la Comunidad de Madrid, Madrid
Attendance: 3,511
Referees: Andris Aunkrogers (LAT), Alan dos Santos (BRA), Cecília Tóth (HUN)

=== 15th place game ===
23 July 2023
10:00

Boxscore

Chinese Taipei	79–72 (OT)	Argentina
Scoring by quarter: 16–14, 12–13, 18–24, 22–17, Overtime: 11–4
Pts: Hsiao 19; Rebs: Hsiao 14; Asts: Hsiao, Mi 3		Pts: Tapari 22; Rebs: Fernández 11; Asts: Tapari 3

Complejo Deportivo Espartales, Alcalá de Henares
Attendance: 41
Referees: Valentin Oliot (FRA), Monicca Nassuuna (UGA), Aya Ahmed (EGY)

=== 13th place game ===
23 July 2023
12:30

Boxscore

Brazil	62–76	China
Scoring by quarter: 20–12, 14–22, 17–19, 11–23
Pts: De Oliveira 15; Rebs: Alves 12; Asts: De Oliveira 8		Pts: Hu 28; Rebs: Li Q. 9 Asts: Li Q. 8

Complejo Deportivo Espartales, Alcalá de Henares
Attendance: 97
Referees: Felipe Ibarra (CHI), Andrada Csender (ROU), Dorothy Okatch (BOT)

=== Eleventh place game ===
23 July 2023
15:30

Boxscore

Egypt	56–64	Italy
Scoring by quarter: 13–12, 11–16, 15–15, 17–21
Pts: Sallman 20; Rebs: Sallman 15; Asts: Sallman 3		Pts: Caloro 18; Rebs: Cancelli 9 Asts: Blasigh 7

Complejo Deportivo Espartales, Alcalá de Henares
Attendance: 49
Referees: Carsten Straube (GER), Micaela Prado (ARG), Yu Yijing (CHN)

=== Ninth place game ===
23 July 2023
18:00

Boxscore

Australia	81–73	Germany
Scoring by quarter: 17–23, 22–22, 24–15, 18–13
Pts: Burrows, Puoch 18; Rebs: Heal 10; Asts: Juffermans 5		Pts: Bühner 19; Rebs: Bühner 5 Asts: Bühner 5

Complejo Deportivo Espartales, Alcalá de Henares
Attendance: 163
Referees: Esperanza Mendoza (SPA), Yann Davidson (MAD), Edwin Quiles (PUR)

=== Seventh place game ===
23 July 2023
13:00

Boxscore

Lithuania	50–76	Czech Republic
Scoring by quarter: 15–18, 10–19, 16–18, 9–21
Pts: Raulušaitytė 12; Rebs: Pliatkutė 9 Asts: Pliatkutė 4		Pts: Kadlecová 18; Rebs: Paurová 10; Asts: Jedličková 5

Palacio de Deportes de la Comunidad de Madrid, Madrid
Attendance: 150
Referees: Carlos Peralta (ECU), Christine Vuong (CAN), Cecília Tóth (HUN)

=== Fifth place game ===
23 July 2023
15:30

Boxscore

Mali	73–61	Japan
Scoring by quarter: 19–12, 18–10, 14–24, 22–15
Pts: Haidara 18; Rebs: Haidara 9 Asts: Haidara 7		Pts: Owaki 15; Rebs: Morioka, Owaki 8 Asts: Morioka 5

Palacio de Deportes de la Comunidad de Madrid, Madrid
Attendance: 334
Referees: Wojciech Liszka (POL), Amel Dahra (FRA), Lee Ji-youn (KOR)

=== Third place game ===
23 July 2023
18:30

Boxscore

Canada	80–73 (OT)	France
Scoring by quarter: 15–22, 23–15, 17–23, 13–8, Overtime: 12–5
Pts: Swords 26; Rebs: Fournier 8 Asts: Prosper 6		Pts: Dibanzilua 17; Rebs: Dutat 17; Asts: Sanou 6

Palacio de Deportes de la Comunidad de Madrid, Madrid
Attendance: 1,636
Referees: Gina Cross (USA), Carmelo De La Rosa (PUR), Jacquiline Dover (AUS)

=== Final ===
23 July 2023
21:00

Boxscore

Spain	66–69	United States
Scoring by quarter: 16–21, 18–13, 18–20, 14–15
Pts: Martín Carrión 19; Rebs: three players 5 Asts: Buenavida 6		Pts: McMahon 16; Rebs: Booker 10; Asts: Hidalgo 7

Palacio de Deportes de la Comunidad de Madrid, Madrid
Attendance: 7,033
Referees: Andris Aunkrogers (LAT), Alan dos Santos (BRA), Ventsislav Velikov (BUL)

== Final standings ==
Rank	Team	Record
1st place, gold medalist(s)	United States	7–0
2nd place, silver medalist(s)	Spain	6–1
3rd place, bronze medalist(s)	Canada	6–1
4th	France	4–3
5th	Mali	5–2
6th	Japan	5–2
7th	Czech Republic	4–3
8th	Lithuania	3–4
9th	Australia	4–3
10th	Germany	3–4
11th	Italy	3–4
12th	Egypt	2–5
13th	China	2–5
14th	Brazil	1–6
15th	Chinese Taipei	1–6
16th	Argentina	0–7

== Statistics and awards ==
=== Statistical leaders ===
==== Players ====
Points

Name	PPG
(Egypt) Jana El-Alfy	21.4
(Italy) Eleonora Villa	18.6
(Czech Republic) Dominika Paurová	17.4
(France) Leïla Lacan	17.1
(Italy) Vittoria Blasigh	16.9

Rebounds

Name	RPG
(Canada) Toby Fournier	13.7
(Mali) Maimouna Haidara	13.0
(France) Anaëlle Dutat	12.6
(Egypt) Jana El-Alfy	11.0
(Germany) Frieda Bühner	10.3

Assists

Name	APG
(Spain) Elena Buenavida	6.1
(United States) Hannah Hidalgo	5.4
(Brazil) Ana Paula de Oliveira	5.1
(Japan) Nanami Tsuno	4.7
(Italy) Beatrice Caloro	4.3

Blocks

Name	BPG
(Germany) Annika Soltau	3.4
(Chinese Taipei) Chin Hua-yu	2.6
(Canada) Toby Fournier	2.1
(Canada) Cassandre Prosper	1.8
(Czech Republic) Emma Čechová	1.6
(Italy) Adele Cancelli	1.6

Steals

Name	SPG
(Mali) Maimouna Haidara	4.4
(Brazil) Ana Paula de Oliveira	3.6
(France) Anaëlle Dutat	3.6
(United States) Hannah Hidalgo	3.1
(France) Leïla Lacan	3.0

Efficiency

Name	EFFPG
(Mali) Maimouna Haidara	24.6
(Canada) Toby Fournier	22.3
(Egypt) Jana El-Alfy	22.0
(France) Anaëlle Dutat	20.3
(Czech Republic) Dominika Paurová	19.3

==== Teams ====
Points

Team	PPG
United States	97.0
Canada	81.4
Spain	76.0
Australia	75.7
Japan	75.7

Rebounds

Team	RPG
United States	53.3
Canada	52.6
Brazil	47.6
Italy	46.1
Egypt	45.7

Assists

Team	APG
Spain	20.9
United States	20.9
Australia	19.6
Japan	19.0
Czech Republic	18.3

Blocks

Team	BPG
Canada	6.0
Chinese Taipei	5.6
United States	5.4
Germany	4.9
Australia	4.4

Steals

Team	SPG
Mali	15.6
France	14.7
Spain	13.7
United States	13.3
Czech Republic	13.1

Efficiency

Team	EFFPG
United States	124.4
Canada	93.3
Spain	89.9
Australia	85.4
Japan	83.9

=== Awards ===
The awards were announced on 23 July 2023.

All-Tournament Team
Guards	Forwards	Center
(Spain) Iyana Martín Carrión (United States) Hannah Hidalgo (France) Leïla Lacan	(United States) Joyce Edwards (Canada) Toby Fournier	
MVP: (Spain) Iyana Martín Carrión
All-Second Team
Guards	Forwards	Center
(Canada) Syla Swords	(Mali) Maimouna Haidara (Egypt) Jana El-Alfy (Czech Republic) Dominika Paurová	(Spain) Awa Fam
Best defensive player: (France) Anaëlle Dutat
Best coach: (Spain) Bernat Canut Font
