= Gerda Raulušaitytė =

Lithuanian basketball player (born 2004)

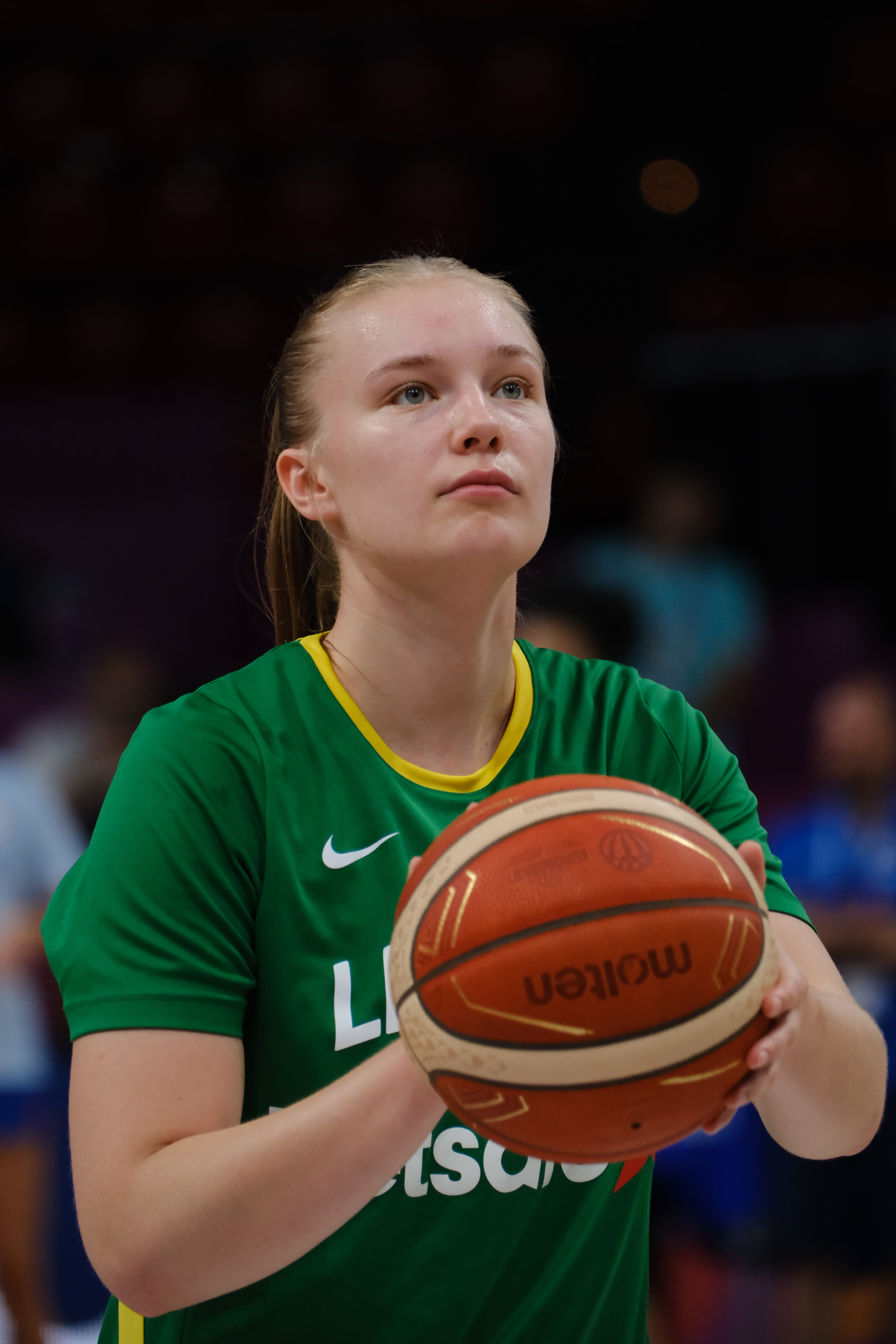
- Raulušaitytė with the Lithuania national team

No. 8 – Arizona Wildcats
- Position: Power forward / center
- League: NCAA

Personal information
- Born: 11 September 2004 (age 22) Varėna, Lithuania
- Listed height: 1.89 m (6 ft 2 in)

Career information
- High school: Vilnius Ozas Gymnasium
- College: USC (2025–26); Arizona (2026–present)
- Playing career: 2019–present

Career history
- 2019–2020: Kibirkštis Vilnius
- 2021: RKL-GUT.LT Alytus
- 2021: Kibirkštis Vilnius
- 2021-2022: Kibirkštis-MRU Vilnius
- 2022-2023: Kibirkštis Vilnius
- 2023-2025: LCC International University Klaipėda

Career highlights
- Lithuanian Women Basketball Player of the Year (2024); Lithuanian League MVP (2025)

Gerda Raulušaitytė (born 11 September 2004) is a Lithuanian professional basketball player, who previously played for the Lithuanian basketball clubs and currently represents the Arizona Wildcats in the NCAA. She was selected the 2024 Lithuanian Women Basketball Player of the Year.

== College career ==
In July 2025, Raulušaitytė committed to play for the USC Trojans in the NCAA.

In April 2026, Raulušaitytė transferred to play for the Arizona Wildcats.

== Professional career ==
In 2019–2025, Raulušaitytė played for the Lithuanian women's professional basketball clubs in the Division A (first tier) and Division B (second tier) of Moterų Lietuvos Krepšinio Lyga. In May 2025, Raulušaitytė was selected the Most valuable player of the 2024–25 MLKL season after leading her team LCC International University Klaipėda to a third place.

Raulušaitytė has been selected the 2024 Lithuanian Women Basketball Player of the Year.

== National team career ==
Raulušaitytė represented the Lithuania youth national teams and was one of Lithuania's key players in the 2022 FIBA U18 Women's European Championship, 2023 FIBA Under-19 Women's Basketball World Cup, and 2024 FIBA U20 Women's EuroBasket.

Raulušaitytė was included to the senior Lithuania women's national basketball team roster during the EuroBasket Women 2023 qualification, however she did not play in games. Later in the EuroBasket Women 2025 qualification she appeared in three games and averaged 6.3 points, two rebounds, and one assist per game and helped her team to qualify for the EuroBasket Women 2025. She was included into the Lithuania's national team final roster for the EuroBasket Women 2025, however in the tournament she played in just one game and dished out one assist.
