= List of P. League+ arenas =

The following list includes all current and former arenas used by current and defunct teams playing in the P. League+ (PLG).

Currently 2 home arenas were shared with Taiwan Professional Basketball League teams due to lack of qualified basketball arenas in Taiwan.

== Current arenas ==
Image	Arena	Location	Team(s)	Capacity	Opened	Ref(s)
	Fengshan Arena	Kaohsiung City	Kaohsiung 17LIVE Steelers	5,321	1977	
	NCKU Chung Cheng Gym	Tainan City	Tainan TSG GhostHawks	3,500	1975	
	Taipei Heping Basketball Gymnasium	Taipei City	Taipei Fubon Braves	7,000	2017	
	Taoyuan Arena	Taoyuan City	Taoyuan Pauian Pilots	6,470	1993	

== Former arenas ==
Team	Arena	Years used	Capacity	Opened	Location	Ref.
Formosa Dreamers Formosa Taishin Dreamers	Changhua County Stadium	2020–2021; 2023–2024	5,600	1985	Changhua County	
Formosa Dreamers Formosa Taishin Dreamers	Intercontinental Basketball Stadium	2021–2024	3,000	2016	Taichung City	
Formosa Dreamers Formosa Taishin Dreamers	NTUS Gymnasium	2021 (2 games)	5,000	1961	Taichung City	
Hsinchu Toplus Lioneers Hsinchu JKO Lioneers	Hsinchu County Stadium	2020–2024	8,068	2005	Hsinchu County	
New Taipei Kings	Xinzhuang Gymnasium	2021–2024	6,800	2002	New Taipei City	
Taoyuan Pauian Pilots Taoyuan Pilots	Nanshan HS Gymnasium	2022 (1 game)	0	2006	New Taipei City	
Taoyuan Pauian Pilots Taoyuan Pilots	NTSU Multipurpose Gymnasium	2021 (2 games)	6,800	1986	Taoyuan City	

== Preseason venues ==
Arena	Years used	Capacity	Opened	Location	Ref.
Fengshan Arena	2021, 2022	5,321	1977	Kaohsiung City	
Hsinchu County Stadium	2020	8,068	2005	Hsinchu County	
Keelung Municipal Stadium	2023	5,937	1981	Keelung City	
NCKU Chung Cheng Gym	2024	3,500	1975	Tainan City	
NTU Sports Center	2021	3,397	2001	Taipei City	
NTUS Gymnasium	2020	5,000	1961	Taichung City	
Taipei Heping Basketball Gymnasium	2020	7,000	2017	Taipei City	
Xinzhuang Gymnasium	2021	6,800	2002	New Taipei City	

== Awards ==
=== Best Home Court ===
Year	Team	Home court	Ref.
2021	Hsinchu JKO Lioneers	Hsinchu County Stadium	
2022	Hsinchu JKO Lioneers	Hsinchu County Stadium	
2023	Hsinchu JKO Lioneers	Hsinchu County Stadium	
2024	Hsinchu Toplus Lioneers	Hsinchu County Stadium	

== See also ==
- P. League+
- List of basketball arenas
- List of stadiums in Taiwan
