= 2025–26 MLKL season =

23rd season of the women top-tier level professional basketball league of Lithuania

Open Smart Way–MLKL
- Season: 2025–26
- Duration: 28 September 2025 – 28 April 2026
- Teams: 10

Finals
- Champions: Kibirkštis-TOKS
- Runners-up: Neptūnas-Amberton
- Third place: Šiauliai–Vilmers
- Fourth place: LCC International University

Records
- Biggest home win: Kibirkštis-TOKS 129–45 Tallinna Spordiakadeemia (1 November 2025)
- Biggest away win: MKK Panevėžys 41–125 Kibirkštis-TOKS (5 October 2025)
- Highest scoring: LCC International University 71–111 Kibirkštis-TOKS (7 December 2025)
- Winning streak: 18 games Kibirkštis-TOKS
- Losing streak: 10 games MKK Panevėžys

Seasons
- ← 2024–25 2026–27 →

The 2025–26 Moterų Lietuvos krepšinio lyga season, also called Open Smart Way–MLKL for sponsorship reasons, was the 24th season of the women top-tier level professional basketball league of Lithuania, the Moterų Lietuvos Krepšinio Lyga (MLKL). Kibirkštis-TOKS successfully defended both Baltic and the championships by defeating TTT–Rīga and Neptūnas-Amberton in the finals.

== Teams ==
The league merged with Baltic Basketball League and will feature teams from Lithuania, Latvia and Estonia. Ten teams including seven teams from Lithuania, two teams from Latvia and one Estonian team will participate in this season. Teams will face each other two times, with Top 8 teams advancing to the playoffs. The winner of the playoffs would be recognised as the Baltic League champions, while for Lithuanian championship a separate playoffs system would used, with top Lithuanian team receiving bye to the semifinals.

Location of teams in 2025–26 MLKL

Team	Location	Arena
(Lithuania) MKK Panevėžys	Panevėžys	Kalnapilio Arena
(Lithuania) LCC International University	Klaipėda	Michealsen center
(Lithuania) Aistės-LSMU Kaunas	Kaunas	LSMU Sports center
(Lithuania) Neptūnas-Amberton	Klaipėda	BĮ Sporto bazių valdymo center
(Lithuania) Kibirkštis-TOKS	Vilnius	Active Vilnius Arena
(Lithuania) Šiauliai–Vilmers	Šiauliai	Šiauliai Arena
(Lithuania) Alytus ALYTUS-GUT.LT	Alytus	Alytus Arena
(Estonia) Tallinna Spordiakadeemia	Tallinn	RING Sport & Sauna basketball hall
(Latvia) TTT–Rīga	Riga	Rimi Olympic Sports Center
(Latvia) Rīga Stradiņš Universitate	Riga	Rimi Olympic Sports Center

== Open MLKL ==
=== League table ===
Pos	Team	Pld	W	L	PF	PA	PD	Pts	Qualification
1	Kibirkštis-TOKS	18	18	0	1788	990	+798	36	Quarterfinals
2	TTT–Rīga	18	15	3	1603	1092	+511	33	Quarterfinals
3	BC Neptūnas-Amberton	18	14	4	1537	1095	+442	32	Quarterfinals
4	Šiauliai–Vilmers	18	12	6	1351	1173	+178	30	Quarterfinals
5	LCC International University	18	10	8	1286	1354	−68	28	Quarterfinals
6	Aistės-LSMU Kaunas	18	7	11	1084	1295	−211	25	Quarterfinals
7	Rīga Stradiņš Universitate	18	6	12	1043	1324	−281	24	Quarterfinals
8	Alytus ALYTUS-GUT.LT	18	4	14	1098	1499	−401	22	Quarterfinals
9	Tallinna Spordiakadeemia	18	3	15	1079	1493	−414	21	
10	MKK Panevėžys	18	1	17	1002	1556	−554	19	

Source: Moterulyga
Rules for classification: 1) Points; 2) Points difference; 3) Points scored.

=== Results ===
Home \ Away	AIS	NEP	LCC	KIB	PAN	SIA	TTT	RSU	TSA	ALY
Aistės-LSMU Kaunas	—	45–64	65–59	45–86	76–48	46–74	60–88	57–54	59–65	64–59
Neptūnas-Amberton	90–47	—	87–68	76–98	98–65	104–97	85–72	78–55	128–47	101–59
LCC International University	80–65	56–89	—	71–111	87–57	75–71	59–89	78–63	79–77	77–63
Kibirkštis-TOKS	109–42	88–55	98–73	—	100–61	94–50	64–54	105–55	129–45	120–49
MKK Panevėžys	56–85	53–114	69–86	41–125	—	59–76	56–114	78–99	57–81	75–60
Šiauliai–Vilmers	83–64	20–0	77–65	71–83	98–43	—	54–81	83–50	87–75	106–61
TTT–Rīga	86–49	91–86	102–67	68–79	113–52	72–63	—	103–60	75–54	111–55
Rīga Stradiņš Universitate	65–56	56–99	58–76	43–83	20–0	67–87	48–96	—	71–50	72–69
Tallinna Spordiakadeemia	69–85	48–93	59–68	43–105	77–69	62–88	44–91	53–66	—	62–70
Alytus ALYTUS-GUT.LT	60–74	50–90	54–62	47–111	67–63	72–86	57–97	73–60	73–68	—

Source: moterulyga.lt
Legend: Blue = home team win; Red = away team win.
Matches with lighter background shading were decided after overtime.

=== Play offs ===
Quarterfinals
1	Kibirkštis-TOKS	97	139	236
8	Alytus ALYTUS-GUT.LT	40	53	93
4	Šiauliai–Vilmers	75	71	146
5	LCC International University	98	51	149
3	BC Neptūnas-Amberton	92	82	174
6	Aistės-LSMU Kaunas	74	65	139
2	TTT–Rīga	77	85	162
7	Rīga Stradiņš Universitate	36	58	94

Semifinals
1	Kibirkštis-TOKS	92
5	LCC International University	37
3	BC Neptūnas-Amberton	61
2	TTT–Rīga	71

Final
1	Kibirkštis-TOKS	95
2	TTT–Rīga	79
Third place
5	LCC International University	38
3	BC Neptūnas-Amberton	78

== Lithuanian championship ==
=== League table ===
Pos	Team	Pld	W	L	PF	PA	PD	Pts	Qualification
1	Kibirkštis-TOKS	12	12	0	1223	681	+542	24	Semifinals
2	BC Neptūnas-Amberton	12	9	3	968	746	+222	21	Quarterfinals
3	Šiauliai–Vilmers	12	8	4	909	766	+143	20	Quarterfinals
4	LCC International University	12	6	6	859	906	−47	18	Quarterfinals
5	Aistės-LSMU Kaunas	12	5	7	718	868	−150	17	Quarterfinals
6	Alytus ALYTUS-GUT.LT	12	1	11	701	1029	−328	13	Quarterfinals
7	MKK Panevėžys	12	1	11	690	1072	−382	13	Quarterfinals

Source: Moterulyga
Rules for classification: 1) Points; 2) Points difference; 3) Points scored.

=== Results ===
Home \ Away	AIS	NEP	LCC	KIB	PAN	SIA
Aistės-LSMU Kaunas	—	45–64	65–59	45–86	76–48	46–74
Neptūnas-Amberton	90–47	—	87–68	76–98	98–65	104–97
LCC International University	80–65	56–89	—	71–111	87–57	75–71
Kibirkštis-TOKS	109–42	88–55	98–73	—	100–61	94–50
MKK Panevėžys	56–85	53–114	69–86	41–125	—	59–76
Šiauliai–Vilmers	83–64	20–0	77–65	71–83	98–43	—

Source: moterulyga.lt
Legend: Blue = home team win; Red = away team win.
Matches with lighter background shading were decided after overtime.

=== Play offs ===
Quarterfinals
4	LCC International University	78	73	2
5	Aistės-LSMU Kaunas	72	56	0
2	BC Neptūnas-Amberton	127	123	2
7	MKK Panevėžys	45	50	0
3	Šiauliai–Vilmers	78	96	2
6	Alytus ALYTUS-GUT.LT	63	92	0

Semifinals
1	Kibirkštis-TOKS	103	76	2
4	LCC International University	78	51	0
2	BC Neptūnas-Amberton	76	82	2
3	Šiauliai–Vilmers	56	50	0

Final
1	Kibirkštis-TOKS	81	73	95	82	3
2	BC Neptūnas-Amberton	72	81	65	61	1
Third place
4	LCC International University	46	85	52	52	1
3	Šiauliai–Vilmers	74	71	73	92	3
