= 2024–25 MLKL season =

22nd season of the women top-tier level professional basketball league of Lithuania

Smart Way–MLKL
- Season: 2024–25
- Duration: 29 September 2024 – 30 April 2025
- Teams: 6

Regular season
- Season MVP: (Lithuania) Daugile Use

Finals
- Champions: Kibirkštis (11th title)
- Runners-up: Neptūnas-Amberton
- Third place: LCC International University
- Fourth place: Aistės-LSMU Kaunas
- Finals MVP: (Lithuania) Daugile Use

Statistical leaders
Points	(United States) Malia Bambrick	18.2
Rebounds	(Lithuania) Daugile Use	9.1
Assists	(Lithuania) Dalia Donskichyte	6.5
Steals	(Lithuania) Dalia Donskichyte	3.1
Blocks	(Lithuania) Daugile Use	1.7

Records
- Biggest home win: Šiauliai-Vilmers 114–60 MKK Panevėžys (20 October 2024)
- Biggest away win: MKK Panevėžys 60–104 Aistės-LSMU (13 October 2024)
- Highest scoring: LCC 88–101 Kibirkštis (27 October 2024)

Seasons
- ← 2023–24 2025–26 →

The 2024–25 Moterų Lietuvos krepšinio lyga season, also called Smart Way–MLKL for sponsorship reasons, was the 22nd season of the women top-tier level professional basketball league of Lithuania, the Moterų Lietuvos Krepšinio Lyga (MLKL). Kibirkštis successfully defended their championship after defeating Neptūnas-Amberton in the final 3–1.

== Teams ==
Six teams will participate in this season. Teams will face each other three times and all of the teams will advance to the playoffs, with the first and second placed teams receiving byes to the Semifinals.

Location of teams in 2024–25 MLKL

Team	Location	Arena
MKK Panevėžys	Panevėžys	Kalnapilio Arena
LCC International University	Klaipėda	Michealsen center
Aistės-LSMU Kaunas	Kaunas	LSMU Sports center
Neptūnas-Amberton	Klaipėda	BĮ Sporto bazių valdymo center
Kibirkštis	Vilnius	Active Vilnius Arena
Šiauliai–Vilmers	Šiauliai	Šiauliai Arena

== Regular season ==
=== League table ===
Pos	Team	Pld	W	L	PF	PA	PD	Pts	Qualification
1	Kibirkštis	15	15	0	1285	943	+342	30	Semifinals
2	BC Neptūnas-Amberton	15	12	3	1062	888	+174	27	Semifinals
3	LCC International University	15	9	6	1182	1040	+142	24	Quarterfinals
4	Šiauliai–Vilmers	15	6	9	1105	1145	−40	21	Quarterfinals
5	Aistės-LSMU Kaunas	15	3	12	963	1196	−233	18	Quarterfinals
6	MKK Panevėžys	15	0	15	870	1255	−385	15	Quarterfinals

Source: Moterulyga
Rules for classification: 1) Points; 2) Points difference; 3) Points scored.

=== Results ===
Home \ Away	AIS	NEP	LCC	KIB	PAN	SIA
Aistės-LSMU Kaunas	—	49–84	60–77	67–78	63–58	62–68
Aistės-LSMU Kaunas	—	—	61–79	59–105	—	—
Neptūnas-Amberton	84–59	—	75–69	63–78	20–0	92–73
Neptūnas-Amberton	76–55	—	—	—	94–65	91–76
LCC International University	96–57	50–58	—	88–101	101–66	78–68
LCC International University	—	58–67	—	58–61	—	98–85
Kibirkštis	106–53	78–65	79–69	—	82–59	81–64
Kibirkštis	—	69–66	—	—	90–56	94–62
MKK Panevėžys	60–104	50–63	63–87	59–82	—	65–80
MKK Panevėžys	66–84	—	68–97	67–97	—	—
Šiauliai–Vilmers	69–59	59–64	71–77	47–86	114–60	—
Šiauliai–Vilmers	90–71	—	—	—	79–67	—

Source: moterulyga.lt
Legend: Blue = home team win; Red = away team win.
Matches with lighter background shading were decided after overtime.

=== Play offs ===
Quarterfinals
4	Šiauliai–Vilmers	68	62	0
5	Aistės-LSMU Kaunas	80	68	2
3	LCC International University	88	98	2
6	MKK Panevėžys	47	61	0

Semifinals
1	Kibirkštis	100	86	2
5	Aistės-LSMU Kaunas	54	49	0
2	BC Neptūnas-Amberton	75	95	73	2
3	LCC International University	76	67	56	1

Final
1	Kibirkštis	66	69	83	72	3
2	BC Neptūnas-Amberton	77	59	72	59	1
Third place
3	LCC International University	85	62	77	3
5	Aistės-LSMU Kaunas	76	51	59	0

Champions of Lithuania

Kibirkštis
Eleventh title
