= New Taipei Municipal Tam-Shui Vocational High School =

Location
- No.307, Shanggong Rd., Tam-Shui Dist., New Taipei City 25169, Taiwan (R.O.C.)

Information
- Other name: 新北市立淡水商工
- Type: Public School
- Established: 1985
- School district: New Taipei City Tam-Shui District (Chinese: 淡水區)
- Principal: Mr. Gong-Huang Lin (林恭煌)
- Faculty: 200
- Grades: 10-12
- Enrollment: 3000
- Website: https://www.tsvs.ntpc.edu.tw/

New Taipei Municipal Tam-Shui Vocational High School was founded in 1985.

In 2013 it was converted to the local government, New Taipei City, and was named New Taipei Municipal Tam-Shui Vocational High School. The campus covers 12.48 hectares. The vocational department comprises various programs, including Special Education, Data Processing, Accounting, Business Management, Horticulture, Food and Beverage, Computer Science, Electronic Engineering, Control Engineering, Electrical Engineering. Besides, The extension evening department contains three programs: Data Processing Department, Electrical Engineering, and Food and Beverage.

== Awards ==
Awards have been received such as Golden Thumbs in Business Presentation, Gardening and Landscape Design of Agriculture Group, and Industrial Wiring of Industry Group. IN 2009 the girls basketball team. won national girls High School Basketball Leagues (HBL) championship for the 7th time, which has set the record of winning the most victory among all the other high school basketball teams.

== School Activities ==
- Activities held by the Office of Student Affairs include sports day, international education activities, military song contests, Christmas Eve parties, anniversary celebration and campus carnivals, trail running, blessings for entering prestigious colleges, graduation ceremony, live-fire drills, Girl group HBL, intramural volleyball matches, Freshman Cup and Senior Cup basketball games, intramural tug-of-war and field trips.
- Activities held by the Office of Academic Affairs include Chinese language competitions, English comic strip competitions and traveling exhibition activities.
- Activities held by the Counseling Office include counselor conferences, parent-teacher conferences, university fairs, senior mock interviews,

learning-portfolio contests, gender-equity seminars, visits to National Chengchi University campus exposition- Baozhao Tea Festival, visits to National Taiwan University of Arts and alumni talks.

- Activities held by Practice and Job Counseling Office include skill competitions, technique competitions, teachers’ research and study activities for professional growth and industrial-safety poster competitions.
- Activities held by Library include freshmen library orientation, topic-specific book fairs, essay-writing contests, reading-reflection contests and library-week activities.
- International exchange activities: In order to broaden the spectrum of international education, TSVS establishes a sister-school relationship with Foon Yew High School in Malaysia and Meio High School in Japan. In addition, we often hold cultural exchange activities with faculty members and students from Japan, Korea, Russia and China. A sister-school partnership has been established recently with vocational high schools located in Münster, a city in the region of Nordrhein-Westfalen in Germany. Meanwhile, we are aggressively proceeding with exchange activities in Finland. We expand our exchange and cooperation from Asia to Europe with an eye to building up the cornerstone of internationalization.
