= Toby Fournier =

Canadian basketball player (born 2005)

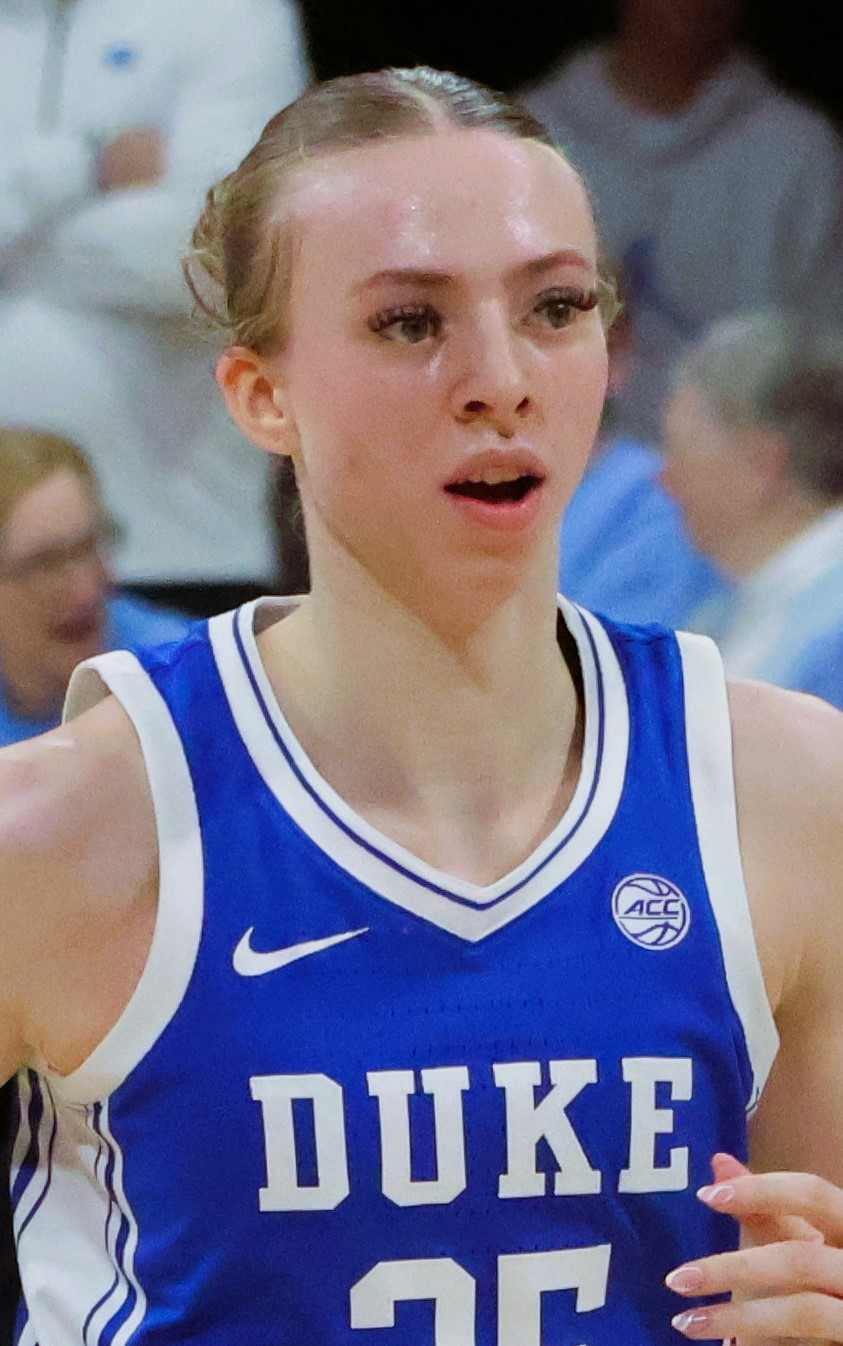
- Fournier with Duke in 2025

No. 35 – Duke Blue Devils
- Position: Forward
- League: Atlantic Coast Conference

Personal information
- Born: October 3, 2005 (age 21)
- Listed height: 6 ft 2 in (1.88 m)

Career information
- High school: Crestwood Prep (Toronto, Ontario)
- College: Duke (2024–present)

Career highlights
- Third-team All-American – AP, USBWA (2026); ACC Rookie of the Year (2025); 2× First-team All-ACC (2025, 2026); ACC All-Defensive Team (2026); ACC All-Freshman Team (2025); 2× Nike Hoop Summit (2023, 2024)
Medals
Women's basketball
Representing Canada
FIBA Under-19 World Cup
Bronze medal – third place	2023 Spain	Team

Toby Lee Fournier (born October 3, 2005) is a Canadian college basketball player for the Duke Blue Devils of the Atlantic Coast Conference (ACC).

== Early life and high school career ==
Fournier competed in the long jump, ballet, soccer, and gymnastics before focusing on basketball, which she began playing at age 12. In eighth grade, she drew attention on Instagram for her dunking ability. Fournier played for Crestwood Preparatory College in Toronto. She competed in the Nike Hoop Summit, where she recorded 18 points and 9 rebounds for the World Select team. Rated a five-star recruit by ESPN, she committed to play college basketball for Duke.

== National team career ==
Fournier led Canada to fourth place in the 2022 FIBA Under-17 Women's Basketball World Cup in Hungary, where she averaged 13.3 points, 11.4 rebounds, and 2.1 blocks per game. She helped her team win the bronze medal at the 2023 FIBA Under-19 Women's Basketball World Cup in Spain. Fournier averaged 16.1 points, a tournament-high 13.7 rebounds, and 2.1 blocks per game, earning All-Star Five honors.

== Career statistics ==
Legend
GP	Games played	GS	Games started	MPG	Minutes per game	RPG	Rebounds per game
APG	Assists per game	SPG	Steals per game	BPG	Blocks per game	PPG	Points per game
TO	Turnovers per game	FG%	Field-goal percentage	3P%	3-point field-goal percentage	FT%	Free-throw percentage
**Bold**	Career best	°	League leader

=== College ===
Year	Team	GP	GS	MPG	FG%	3P%	FT%	RPG	APG	SPG	BPG	TO	PPG
2024–25	Duke	35	0	20.2	52.6	42.9	65.1	5.3	0.4	0.8	1.1	1.8	13.2
2025–26	Duke	36	36	29.1	52.5	33.3	58.1	7.9	1.2	0.9	2.2	2.2	17.3
**Career**		71	36	24.7	52.5	35.3	61.2	6.6	0.8	0.8	1.6	2.0	15.3
Statistics retrieved from Sports-Reference.

== Personal life ==
Fournier's mother, Anais Granofsky, is an actress and screenwriter known for the Degrassi television franchise. Fournier is of one-quarter African-American descent through her maternal grandmother, Jean. Her paternal great-grandfather, Phil Granovsky, was one of the original members of the Toronto Raptors ownership group.
