= Jana El-Alfy =

Egyptian basketball player

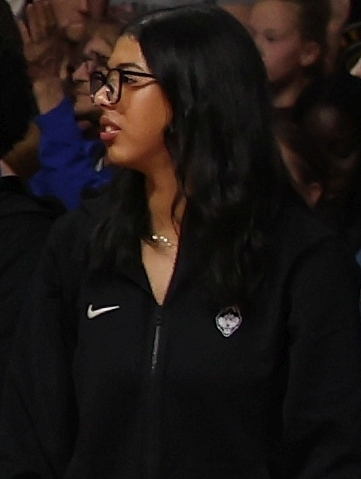
- El-Alfy in 2023

No. 8 – UConn Huskies
- Position: Center

Personal information
- Born: 20 September 2005 (age 20) Cairo, Egypt
- Listed height: 6 ft 5 in (1.96 m)

Career information
- College: UConn (2023–present)

Career highlights
- NCAA champion (2025); FIBA U19 World Cup All-Star Second Team (2023); BWB Africa All-Star (2022); BWB Africa MVP (2022); FIBA U18 African Championship All-Star 5 (2022); FIBA U16 African Championship All-Star 5 (2021)
Medals
Representing Egypt
Women's basketball
FIBA Under 18 African Championship
Silver medal – second place	Madagascar 2022	Team

Jana El-Alfy (born 20 September 2005) is an Egyptian basketball player who plays for UConn Huskies women's basketball and Egypt Women's National Team. In 2022, she became the first African woman and second-ever woman to be invited to attend the NBA Global Academy in Australia.

== Early life ==
El-Alfy was born in Cairo, Egypt to Dina Gouda and Ehab El-Alfy, the head coach of the Egypt women's national basketball team. She has three younger siblings: Malak, Anas, and Moaz.

From a young age, her parents introduced her to both volleyball and basketball, reflecting their respective athletic backgrounds and anticipating her height. Ehab often brought Jana to his practices, where she would spend four to five hours watching basketball daily. By the age of six, she had already shown a strong passion for the sport, once asking her father if she could dunk—a moment he recalls vividly, lowering the basket and enlisting his assistant coach to help her complete the move. Ultimately, it came as no surprise to her father when she chose basketball over volleyball. El-Alfy dove headfirst into the sport, embracing it fully from an early age.

== Career ==
El-Alfy was introduced to both basketball and volleyball when she was three years old; she began playing for Al Ahly SC in Egypt later while following her dad around. In 2022, she was awarded the MVP honor alongside Thierry Darlan by the NBA's Golden State Warriors' coach Steve Kerr at the NBA's Basketball Without Borders Camp's first-ever event held in Cairo.

=== National team career ===
She started her global basketball career at the age of 15 when she represented Egypt at the U16 African Championships. She went on to represent her country at the 2021 FIBA U16 African Championship, the 2022 FIBA U17 World Cup, and the 2022 FIBA U18 African Women's Championship. In 2021, she led her country to gold at the U17 African Championship. At the 2022 FIBA U18, she led Egypt to a silver medal where she averaged 24.7 points and 11.5 rebounds per game.

In 2023, she represented Egypt at the FIBA U19 Women's Basketball World Cup 2023 that was held in Madrid where she scored 29 in her first game. Her performance contributed to Egypt beating China for the first time at the women's youth level. El Alfy suffered a knee injury in the Madrid series.

=== College career ===
In January 2023, El Alfy enrolled at the University of Connecticut for the spring semester and joined the UConn Huskies women's basketball team immediately. Although she did not compete during the 2022-23 season, she practiced and traveled with the team. El Alfy made history as the first player from Egypt to join the UConn program. She chose UConn over several other major programs, including Cincinnati, Duke, Maryland, Michigan, NC State, Louisville, Oregon, UCLA, and UNC.

On July 25, 2023, it was announced that El Alfy would miss the entire 2023-24 season after suffering an Achilles tendon rupture during the 2023 FIBA U19 Women's Basketball World Cup in Spain.

She made her official debut with the Huskies on November 7, 2024, in an 86–32 win over Boston, recording a team-high 17 points and 11 assists for her first career double-double. On April 6, 2025, she won her first national championship, contributing 4 points, 3 rebounds, and 1 steal in 10 minutes of play. Her parents traveled 25 hours from Egypt to watch her play for UConn for the first time and witnessed her celebrate the national title with the Huskies. El Alfy appeared in all 40 games during the 2024-25 season, starting in 27 of them, and averaged 5.0 points and 5.1 rebounds per game.

== Career statistics ==
Legend
GP	Games played	GS	Games started	MPG	Minutes per game	RPG	Rebounds per game
APG	Assists per game	SPG	Steals per game	BPG	Blocks per game	PPG	Points per game
TO	Turnovers per game	FG%	Field-goal percentage	3P%	3-point field-goal percentage	FT%	Free-throw percentage
**Bold**	Career best	°	League leader

*	Denotes seasons in which El-Alfy won an NCAA Championship

=== College ===
Year	Team	GP	GS	MPG	FG%	3P%	FT%	RPG	APG	SPG	BPG	TO	PPG
2023–24	UConn	Did not play due to injury											
2024–25*	UConn	39	26	16.1	52.1	25.0	50.9	5.2	1.0	0.6	0.6	1.2	5.1
**Career**		39	26	16.1	52.1	25.0	50.9	5.2	1.0	0.6	0.6	1.2	5.1
Statistics retrieved from Sports-Reference.

== Personal life ==
El-Alfy is a Muslim and fasts during Ramadan.
