= Chloe Kitts =

American basketball player (born 2004)

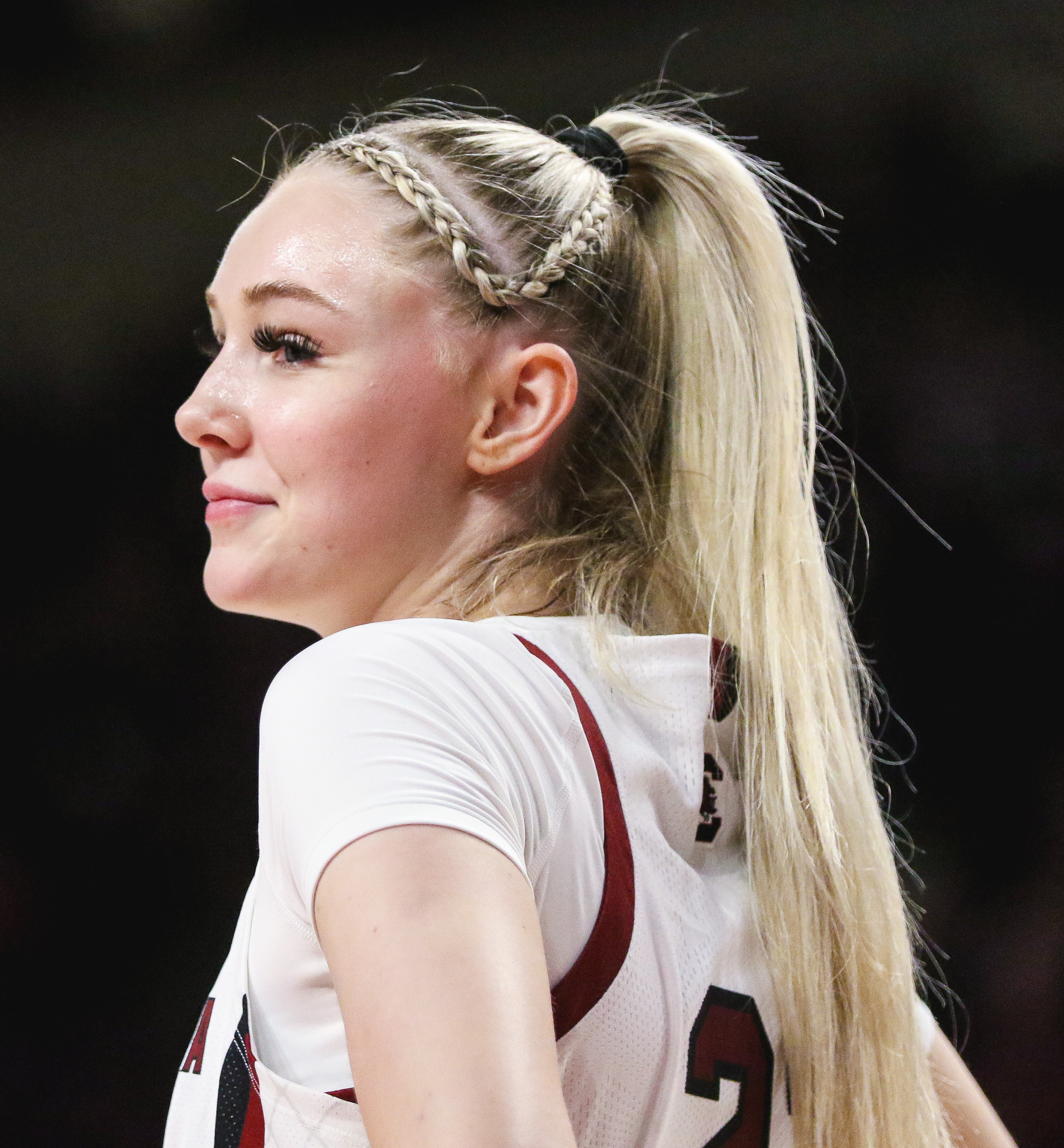
- Kitts with South Carolina in 2022

No. 21 – South Carolina Gamecocks
- Position: Forward
- League: Southeastern Conference

Personal information
- Born: August 5, 2004 (age 22)
- Listed height: 6 ft 3 in (1.91 m)

Career information
- High school: The Master's Academy (Oviedo, Florida); DME Academy (Daytona Beach, Florida)
- College: South Carolina (2022–present)
- Playing career: 2022–present

Career highlights
- NCAA champion (2024); SEC Tournament MVP (2025)
Medals
Women's basketball
Representing the United States
FIBA Under-19 World Cup
Gold medal – first place	2023 Spain	Team
FIBA Under-18 Americas Championship
Gold medal – first place	2022 Argentina	Team

Chloe Kitts (born August 5, 2004) is an American college basketball player for the South Carolina Gamecocks of the Southeastern Conference (SEC).

== Early life and high school career ==
Kitts lived in Puyallup, Washington, and then moved to Oviedo, Florida, in the third grade. As a freshman in high school, she played basketball for the Master's Academy in Oviedo, helping her team reach the Class 3A state title game. For her sophomore season, Kitts transferred to DME Academy in Daytona Beach, Florida. As a junior, she averaged 18.7 points and 8.2 rebounds per game, leading the team to its first GEICO Nationals appearance. Kitts intended to transfer to Faith Christian Academy in Orlando, Florida, following the season, before bypassing her senior year and enrolling early in college.

She was rated a five-star recruit by ESPN and committed to South Carolina over offers from Louisville, Duke, NC State and Arizona. She was ranked fourth in the nation by Prospects Nation.

== College career ==
On December 18, 2022, Kitts made her debut for South Carolina, recording 10 points and seven rebounds in an 87–23 win over Charleston Southern. She received limited playing time as a freshman, averaging 1.6 points per game.

Kitts entered a starting role in her sophomore season. She averaged 9.0 points on 53 percent shooting, 5.8 rebounds, and 1.3 assists for the season. Kitts recorded a double-double in 17 minutes in the title game versus Iowa.

== National team career ==
Kitts won a gold medal with the United States at the 2022 FIBA Under-18 Women's Americas Championship in Argentina. She averaged 7.7 points, 5.8 rebounds and two steals per game. Kitts helped the United States win another gold medal at the 2023 FIBA Under-19 Women's Basketball World Cup in Spain, where she averaged 10.7 points and eight rebounds per game. In the final, she posted 15 points and nine rebounds in a 69–66 win over Spain.

== Career statistics ==
Legend
GP	Games played	GS	Games started	MPG	Minutes per game	RPG	Rebounds per game
APG	Assists per game	SPG	Steals per game	BPG	Blocks per game	PPG	Points per game
TO	Turnovers per game	FG%	Field-goal percentage	3P%	3-point field-goal percentage	FT%	Free-throw percentage
**Bold**	Career best	°	League leader

=== College ===
Year	Team	GP	GS	MPG	FG%	3P%	FT%	RPG	APG	SPG	BPG	TO	PPG
2022–23	South Carolina	18	0	6.9	37.5	25.0	50.0	1.6	0.7	0.2	0.1	**0.4**	1.6
2023–24	South Carolina	37	31	18.6	**54.4**	**50.0**	68.9	5.9	1.4	0.4	**0.6**	1.5	9.1
2024–25	South Carolina	**38**	**38**	**22.4**	52.0	33.3	**79.8**	**7.7**	**1.9**	**0.7**	0.5	1.5	**10.2**
**Career**		93	69	17.9	52.3	33.3	73.4	5.8	1.5	0.5	0.5	1.3	8.1
Statistics retrieved from Sports-Reference.
