= Emma Čechová =

Czech basketball player (born 2004)

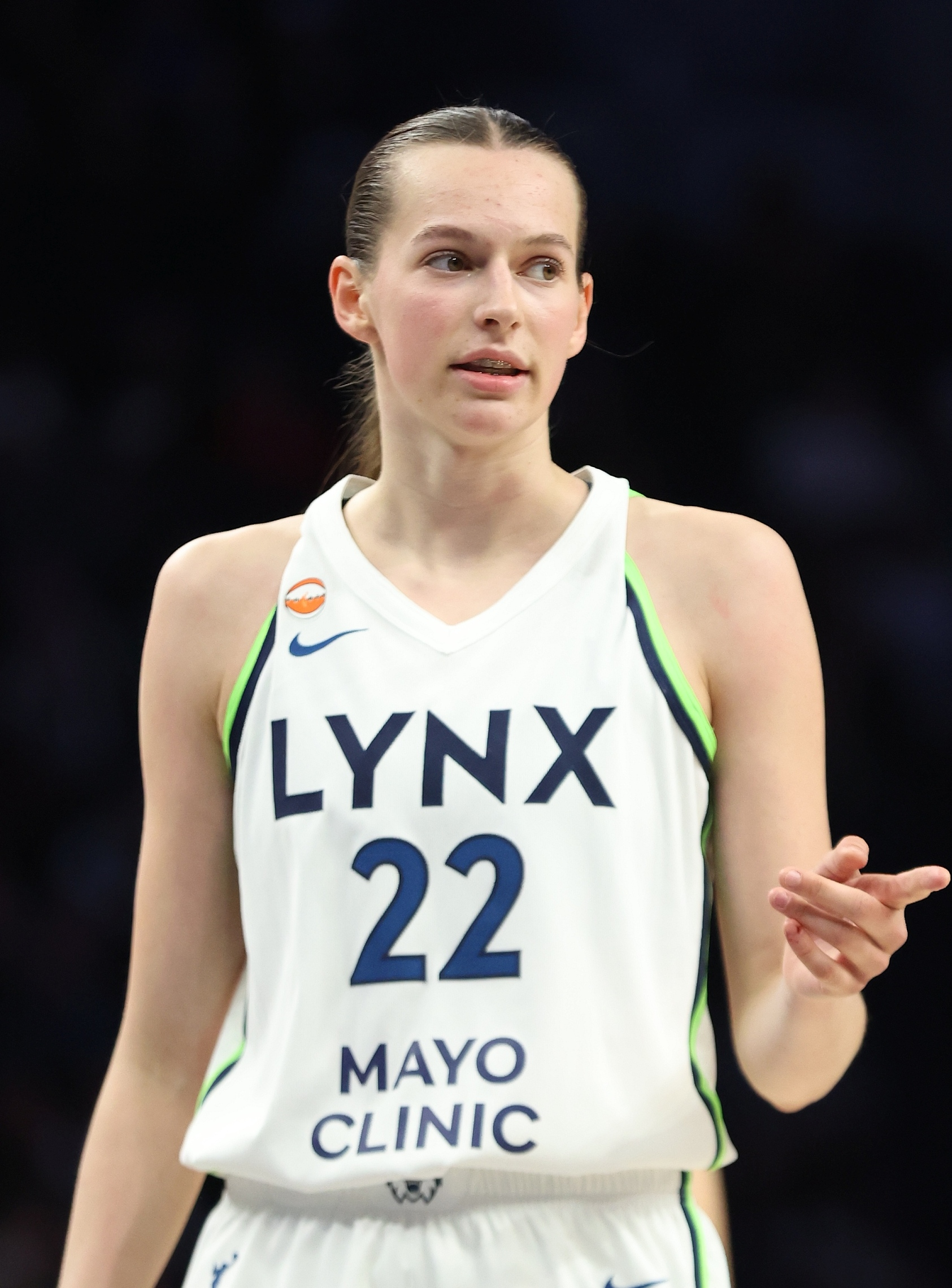
- Čechová with the Minnesota Lynx in 2026

No. 22 – Minnesota Lynx
- Position: Center
- League: WNBA

Personal information
- Born: 12 July 2004 (age 22) Belgium
- Listed height: 6 ft 4 in (1.93 m)
- Listed weight: 180 lb (82 kg)

Career information
- WNBA draft: 2025: undrafted

Career history
- 2022–2025: Žabiny Brno
- 2025–2026: USK Praha
- 2026–present: Minnesota Lynx
- Stats at WNBA.com
- Stats at Basketball Reference

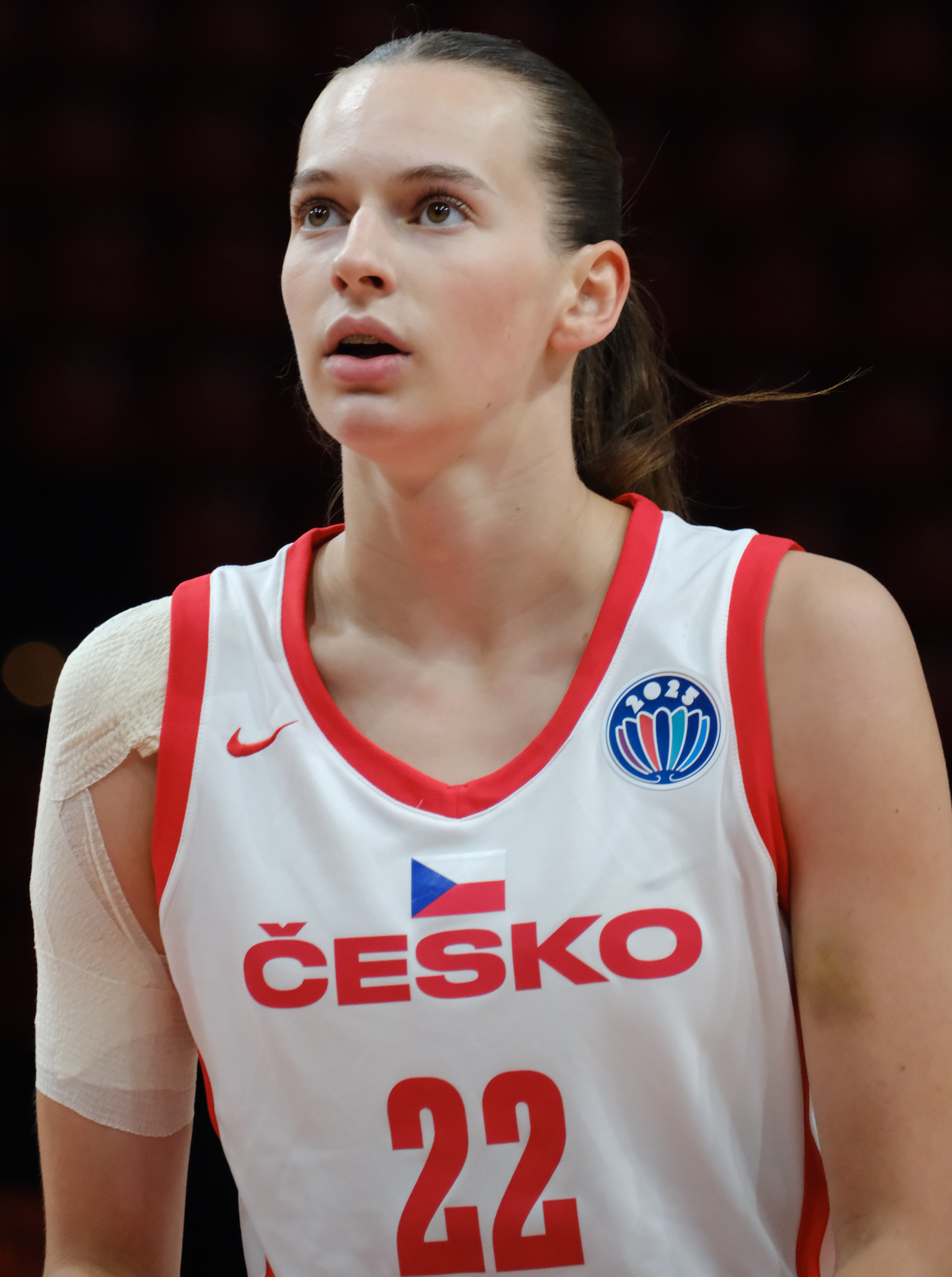

Emma Čechová (born 12 July 2004) is a Czech professional basketball player for the Minnesota Lynx of the Women's National Basketball Association (WNBA). She previously played for Žabiny Brno and USK Praha in the Czech Republic.

== Early life ==
Čechová was born on 12 July 2004 in Belgium. She began playing basketball in Belgium and later moved to Prague, Czech Republic, at age eight. She moved to Vienna at age 15 and played in the Vienna United program, initially for the U16 team before joining the senior team the next year.

== Professional career ==
Čechová played two years for Vienna United in the Austria's top league before moving back to the Czech Republic, where she joined the club Žabiny Brno. With Brno, she helped the team to appearances in the Czech Women's Basketball League (ŽBL) championship three times along with two wins at the Czech Cup. During the 2024–25 season at Brno, she appeared in 27 ŽBL games, averaging 9.6 points and 6.6 rebounds per game. She also averaged 7.6 points and 4.9 rebounds in 14 EuroLeague appearances.

In June 2025, Čechová signed with the club USK Praha, playing the 2025–26 season with them. She averaged 12.8 points and 6.6 rebounds in the Czech league. In April 2026, she signed with the Minnesota Lynx of the Women's National Basketball Association (WNBA). In the last preseason game, she led the team with 16 points.

== International career ==
Čechová made her first appearance with the Czech Republic women's national basketball team in 2022. She has also played for youth national teams, competing at the 2023 FIBA Under-19 Women's Basketball World Cup where she averaged 11.8 points. She averaged 9.8 points and led the Czech team with 6.3 rebounds per game at the EuroBasket Women 2025. She also played at the 2026 FIBA Women's Basketball World Cup Qualifying Tournament, averaging 14.4 points and 6.8 rebounds per game while being named to the tournament all-star five.

== Career statistics ==
Legend
GP	Games played	GS	Games started	MPG	Minutes per game	RPG	Rebounds per game
APG	Assists per game	SPG	Steals per game	BPG	Blocks per game	PPG	Points per game
TO	Turnovers per game	FG%	Field-goal percentage	3P%	3-point field-goal percentage	FT%	Free-throw percentage
**Bold**	Career best	°	League leader

=== WNBA ===
WNBA regular season statistics
Year	Team	GP	GS	MPG	FG%	3P%	FT%	RPG	APG	SPG	BPG	TO	PPG
2026	Minnesota	3	0	17.3	.625	.000	.625	3.7	.0	.3	.7	1.3	8.3
**Career**	1 year, 1 team	3	0	17.3	.625	.000	.625	3.7	.0	.3	.7	1.3	8.3
