= Private NanShan Senior High School =

Private Nanshan Senior High School
- 南山學校財團法人新北市南山高級中學
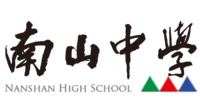
- No. 41 Guangfu Rd, Junghe District, New Taipei City, Taiwan 235, Republic of China

Information
- Type: 3+3 secondary system, private school
- Motto: Self-reliance; A school with aesthetic culture
- Established: 1946 in Shanghai, later revived 1957 in Taiwan
- School district: Zhonghe, New Taipei
- President: Ji-Guang, Wang
- Principal: Ming-Cheng, Tsai
- Grades: Kindergarten, junior high school, senior high school (years 7 to 12)
- Enrollment: ~4,500 (2015)
- Colors: Green, red, blue
- Campus area: 23840.9 square metres
- Website: www.nssh.ntpc.edu.tw

Private Nanshan Senior High School (NSSH; Chinese: 南山中學) is a complete secondary school in Zhonghe District, New Taipei, Taiwan.

== History ==
In 1941, Nanshan was established at No. 112, Fu-Hsin Central Road, Shanghai as the Cheng-Te Vocational School. Following the celebration of China's victory in WWII and president Chiang Kai-shek's 60th birthday, the school was then renamed "Nanshan Private Business School" in 1946, considered the year of establishment. When the Chinese Nationalist government retreated to Taiwan in 1949, the school suspended all lessons. Eight years later, in 1957, the school reopened as "Private Nanshan Industrial Vocational School" at its current location on Guangfu Road. Accepting both junior and senior high school students, about 250 students enrolled that year.

The business management faculty was established in 1961 and the school was renamed "Private Nanshan Business Vocational School". Later, in 1968, the school suspended its junior high section because of a change in government policy. The school's basketball team, the Nanshan Leopards, was established the year after.

The school was renamed "Private Nanshan Business Vocational High School" in 1971. In 1976, the arts faculty was established. Then, the establishment of the information technology faculty in 1987 was swiftly followed by that of the advertisement design department in 1988.

The arts faculty started taking in new students again in 1989 after a short one-year hiatus. However, the advertisement design, business management and international trade management faculties all stopped taking in new students that year. At the same time, the early childhood education and beauty faculties were established. 1989 also saw the establishment of the Nanshan kindergarten.

In 1991, Nanshan was renamed "Private Nanshan Senior High School", the name it retains till this day. The normal high school track was also introduced alongside the vocational track. Three years later, the vocational track was relegated to a side track of the NSSH system. The junior high section was also revived.

Later on, in 1997, a data processing faculty was established and the beauty faculty stopped taking in students. NSSH also started the Zhonghe Community University in 2000, sharing the NSSH campus. After that, in 2001, the school history hall and Jie-Shou Garden were established and a special music class was established. At the same time, the business management faculty was closed. That year, junior high student Tsai Yu-hsuan was awarded the Presidential Education Award.

=== School chairmen ===
Shanghai era

- Mr. Chun, Tsao
- Mr. Tieh-Wu, Hsuan

Taiwan era

- Mr. Hsiung-Hsiang, Lin
- Mr. Chung-Chi, Lin
- Mr. Sen-Chi, Cheng
- Mr. Chi-Chuan, Sun
- Mr. Ji-Guang, Wang (current)

=== Principals ===
Shanghai era

- Mr. Chung-Chieh, Ying

Taiwan era

- Mr. Chung-Chieh, Ying
- Mr. Yu-Chi, Huang
- Mr. Pin, Tsao
- Mr. Yu, Chang
- Mr. Wen-Hua, Chang
- Mr. Chi-Chuan, Sun
- Mr. Ji-Guang, Wang
- Mr. Ming-Chen, Tsai (current)

== Departments ==
- Kindergarten: established in 1989
- Primary after-school: after-school care provided for primary school students
- Junior high: established in 1994
- Senior high: established in 1991
