= Haru Owaki =

Japanese basketball player

No. 91 – Fujitsu Red Wave
- Position: Power forward
- League: Women's Japan Basketball League

Personal information
- Born: March 4, 2004 (age 22) Yamaguchi Prefecture, Japan
- Listed height: 178 cm (5 ft 10 in)
Medals
Women's basketball
Representing Japan
FIBA Under-18 Women's Asia Cup
Bronze medal – third place	2022 Bengaluru	Team
Asian Games
Silver medal – second place	2026 Aichi–Nagoya	Team

Haru Owaki (Japanese: 大脇 晴, romanized: Owaki Haru; born 4 March 2004) is a Japanese professional basketball player who plays as a power forward for the Fujitsu Red Wave in the Women's Japan Basketball League (WJBL). She has represented Japan in international competitions, including the 2026 Asian Games, where she won a silver medal with the national team.

== Career ==
Owaki attended Keishin High School before playing college basketball at Tokyo Healthcare University. She subsequently joined the Fujitsu Red Wave, competing in Japan's top women's basketball league.

Owaki represented Japan at the 2022 FIBA Under-18 Women's Asian Championship in Bengaluru, India. She averaged 8.8 points and 6.4 rebounds per game as Japan finished third and won the bronze medal.

In July 2023, Owaki competed at the FIBA Under-19 Women's Basketball World Cup in Madrid, Spain. She averaged 15 points, 5.1 rebounds and 3.3 assists per game across seven appearances, helping Japan finish sixth. She scored 23 points in Japan's quarter-final against France.

Owaki continued to represent Japan in international basketball, including at the 2025 Summer World University Games in Rhine-Ruhr, Germany. Japan's women's team finished fifth in the tournament.

At the 2026 Asian Games in Aichi and Nagoya, Japan, Owaki played for Japan's women's national basketball team. Japan reached the final against South Korea on 26 September 2026, losing 75–70 to finish with the silver medal. Owaki scored 23 points in the final and helped keep Japan within reach of South Korea in the closing minutes. She was subsequently selected to the Asia-Basket All-Asian Games women's first team.
