= Frieda Bühner =

German basketball player

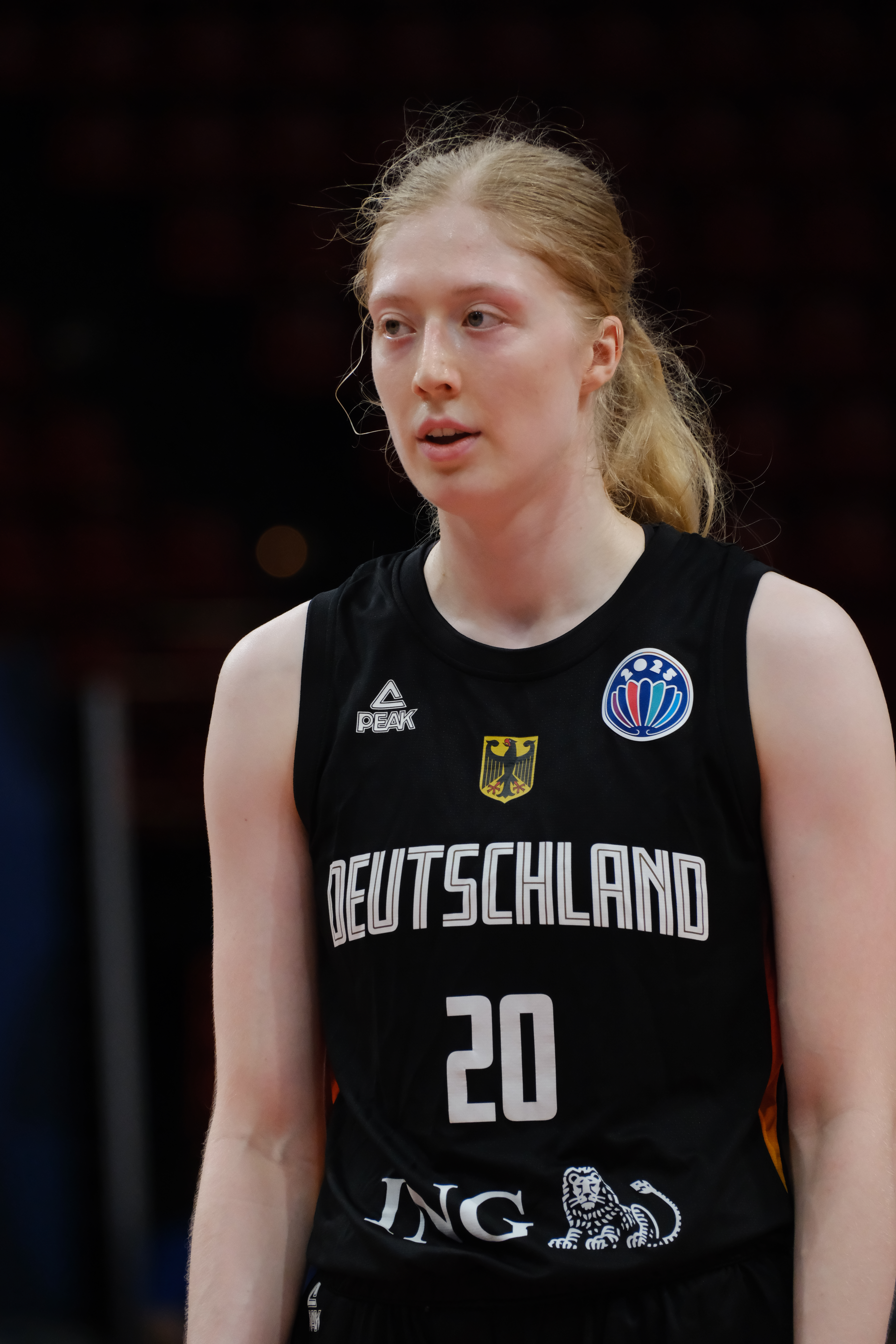

No. 20 – Portland Fire
- Position: Forward
- League: WNBA

Personal information
- Born: 28 May 2004 (age 22)
- Listed height: 1.86 m (6 ft 1 in)
- Listed weight: 79.4 kg (175 lb)

Career information
- WNBA draft: 2026: 2nd round, 17th overall pick
- Drafted by: Portland Fire

Career history
- 2026–present: Portland Fire
- Stats at Basketball Reference

Frieda Mizzi Bühner (born 28 May 2004) is a German basketball player for the Portland Fire of the Women's National Basketball Association (WNBA). She represented Germany at the 2024 Summer Olympics and at the FIBA U20 Women’s EuroBasket 2024.

In the 2024–25 season Buhner joined Spanish basketball team Movistar Estudiantes.

== College career ==
In November 2021, Bühner signed with the Florida Gators.

Bühner appeared in four games for the Gators, averaging 1.5 points and 1.8 rebounds per game. On November 24, 2022, Bühner signed a professional basketball contract in Germany, forgoing the rest of her NCAA eligibility.

== Professional career ==
=== WNBA ===
Bühner was selected by the Portland Fire with the 17th overall pick in the 2026 WNBA draft. Shortly after being drafted, she was signed to a developmental contract. On May 21, Bühner's contract was converted to a standard roster spot.
