= Jana Sallman =

Egyptian basketball player

No. 12 – Grand Canyon Antelopes
- Position: Center
- League: Mountain West Conference

Personal information
- Born: January 6, 2006 (age 20) Cairo, Egypt
- Listed height: 6 ft 3 in (1.91 m)

Career information
- High school: Western Reserve Academy (Hudson, Ohio)
- College: Memphis (2023–2024); William & Mary (2024–2026); Grand Canyon (2026–present)

Jana "Tika" Sallman (born January 6, 2006) is an Egyptian college basketball player. She currently plays for Grand Canyon Antelopes women's basketball.

== Career history ==
=== High school ===
Sallman attended Western Reserve Academy,where she averaged 11.1 points per game, 2.8 blocks, and nearly securing a double-double average with just under 10 rebounds per contest.

=== College ===
Before joining University of Memphis in 2023, in her freshman year, Sallman represented the Egyptian National Team at the FIBA U16 and U18 Women's African Championships in 2021 and 2023, respectively, achieving an average of over 10.0 points per game on both occasions. Additionally, she participated in the FIBA U17 and U19 World Cup in 2022 and 2023 with the Egyptian National Team and achieving a career-best of 11.1 points and 6.9 points per game, respectively. At Memphis, she averaged 1.4 points and 1.3 rebounds in 4.5 minutes per game. Sallman transferred to William & Mary Tribe in her sophomore year using the transfer portal in 2024. She spent two seasons playing for the Tribe where she averaged 7.0 points and 4.8 rebounds in 15.3 minutes per game. In her junior seasons she was part of William & Mary's 2025 "Cinderalla" NCAA Tournament berth team. In 2026, she transferred to Grand Canyon University to finish her college career.
