= LCC International University =

Liberal arts institution in Klaipėda, Lithuania

Coordinates: 55°43′52″N 21°08′00″E

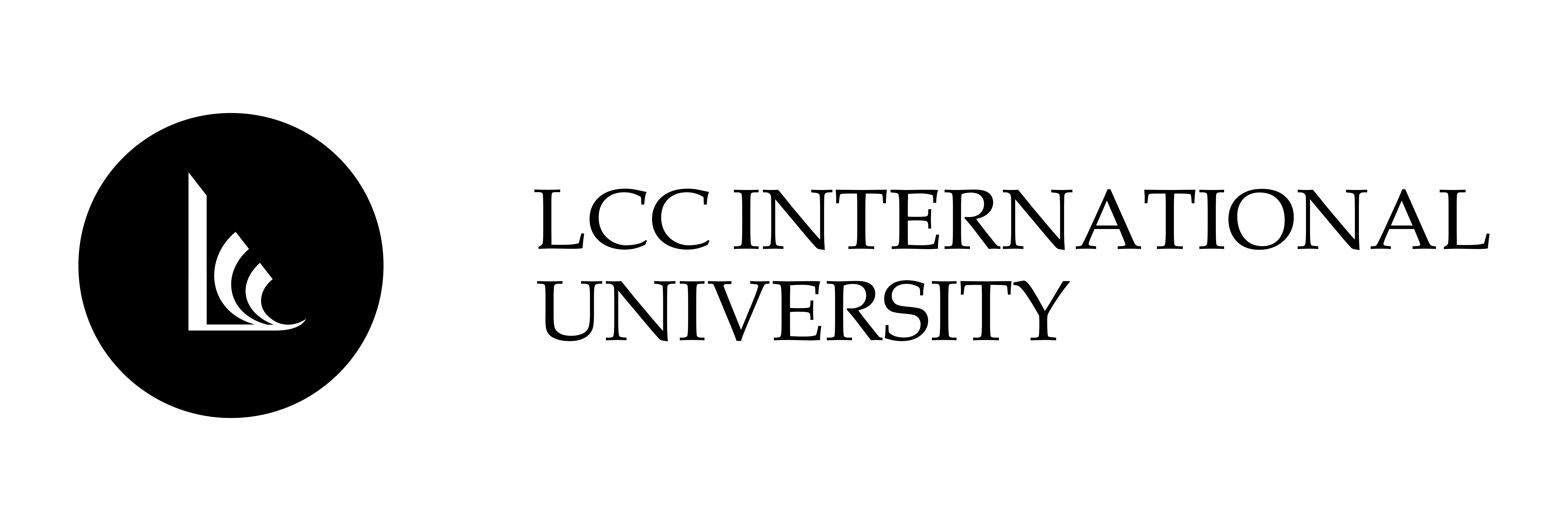
- Type: Private, Christian
- Established: 1991; 35 years ago
- President: Dr. Ken Stoltzfus
- Students: 451
- Location: Klaipėda, Lithuania
- Campus: Urban
- Website: http://www.lcc.lt/

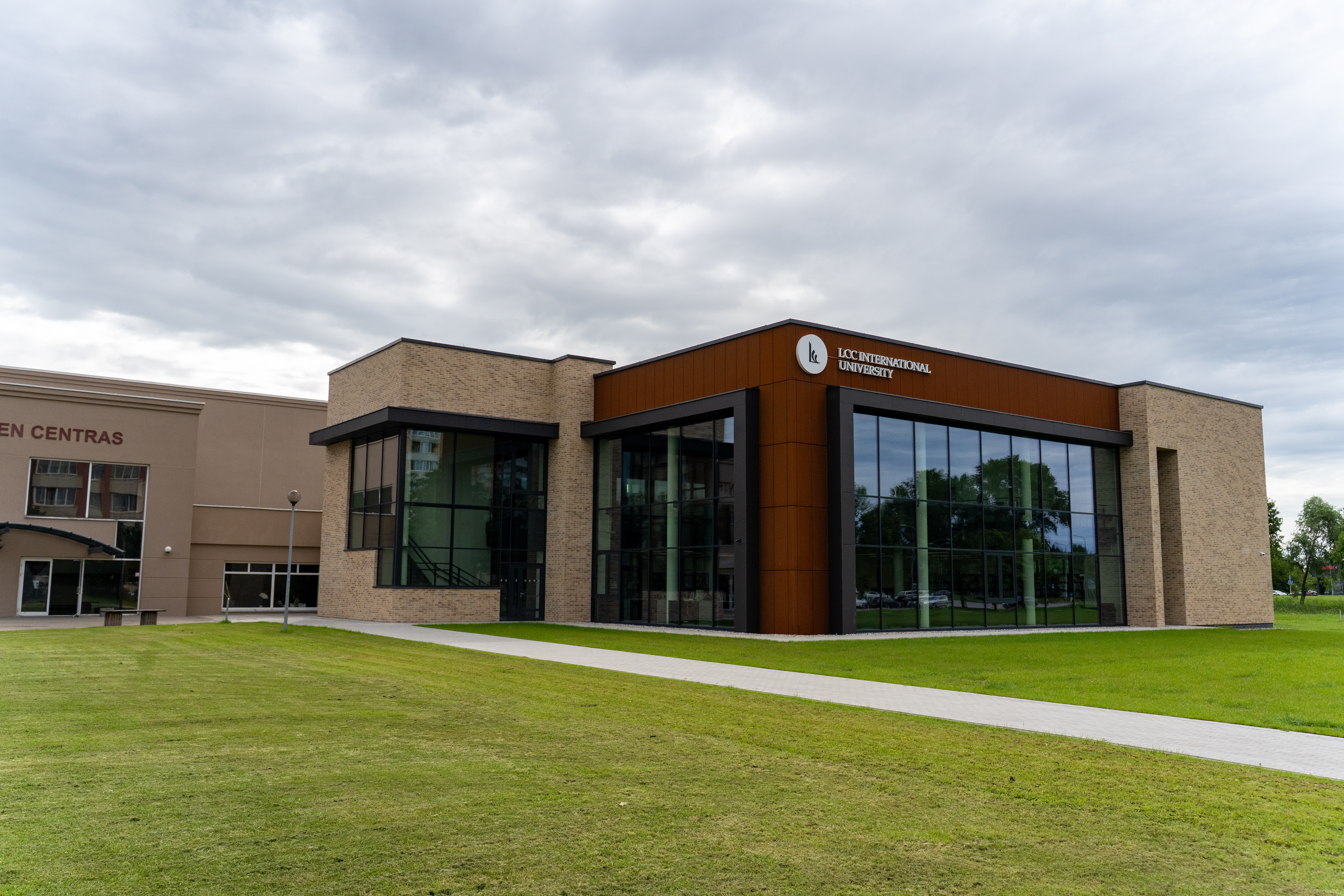
Main campus of the university

LCC International University, formerly Lithuania Christian College (LCC), is an English language liberal arts institution in the city of Klaipėda, Lithuania, established in 1991 by a joint venture of Lithuanian, Canadian and American foundations. This faith-based university attracts students from up to 40 countries, often up to 25% from Ukraine and many other European countries and all students are exposed to Christianity.

It is a member of the European Colleges of Liberal Arts and Sciences.

== Accreditations ==
The Republic of Lithuania recognizes LCC as a bachelor's and master's degrees granting university.

== History ==
At the invitation of the Ministry of Education and Culture, the Lithuania Christian Fund began the establishment of Lithuania Christian College in the summer of 1991 in Panevėžys. That summer the college began with classes in the English language at the first Summer Language Institute. During the fall and spring of 1991-1992, students studied English full-time in the English Language Institute. In August 1999, LCC moved to facilities in Klaipėda, a city along the Baltic coast in Lithuania.

In 2011, Dr. Marlene Wall was appointed President of LCC International University, thereby becoming the first female rector in Lithuania. Wall had previously visited LCC in 1991 to teach English classes at the Summer English Language Institute. She later moved to Klaipėda in 2002. Wall has a doctorate from Kansas State University, United States. Dr. Ken Stoltzfus returned to LCC International University in August 2026, having previously served on the faculty and as department chair.

Study Programs

Students at LCC International University enroll in six bachelor programs of study: International Business Administration, English Language and Literature, Psychology, Theology, Global Business/Communication, and International Relations and Development. LCC also offers a Master of Arts (M.A.) degree in Teaching English to Speakers of other Languages (TESOL).In 2025 LCC International University lost its accreditation for its program in communication; however, it created a new major that combined business and communication. In 2025 Dr. Michael Ray Smith led the program remotely and then Dr. Shane Crombie became chair. The new major is flourishing. Freedoms such as freedom of the press are supported at LCC International University. International University Chronicle has a modest presence on social media.

Given LCC International University's significant contingent of Ukrainian students, faculty and staff have sought to support those students in light of the ongoing Russo-Ukrainian War.
