= Joyce Edwards =

American basketball player (born 2006)

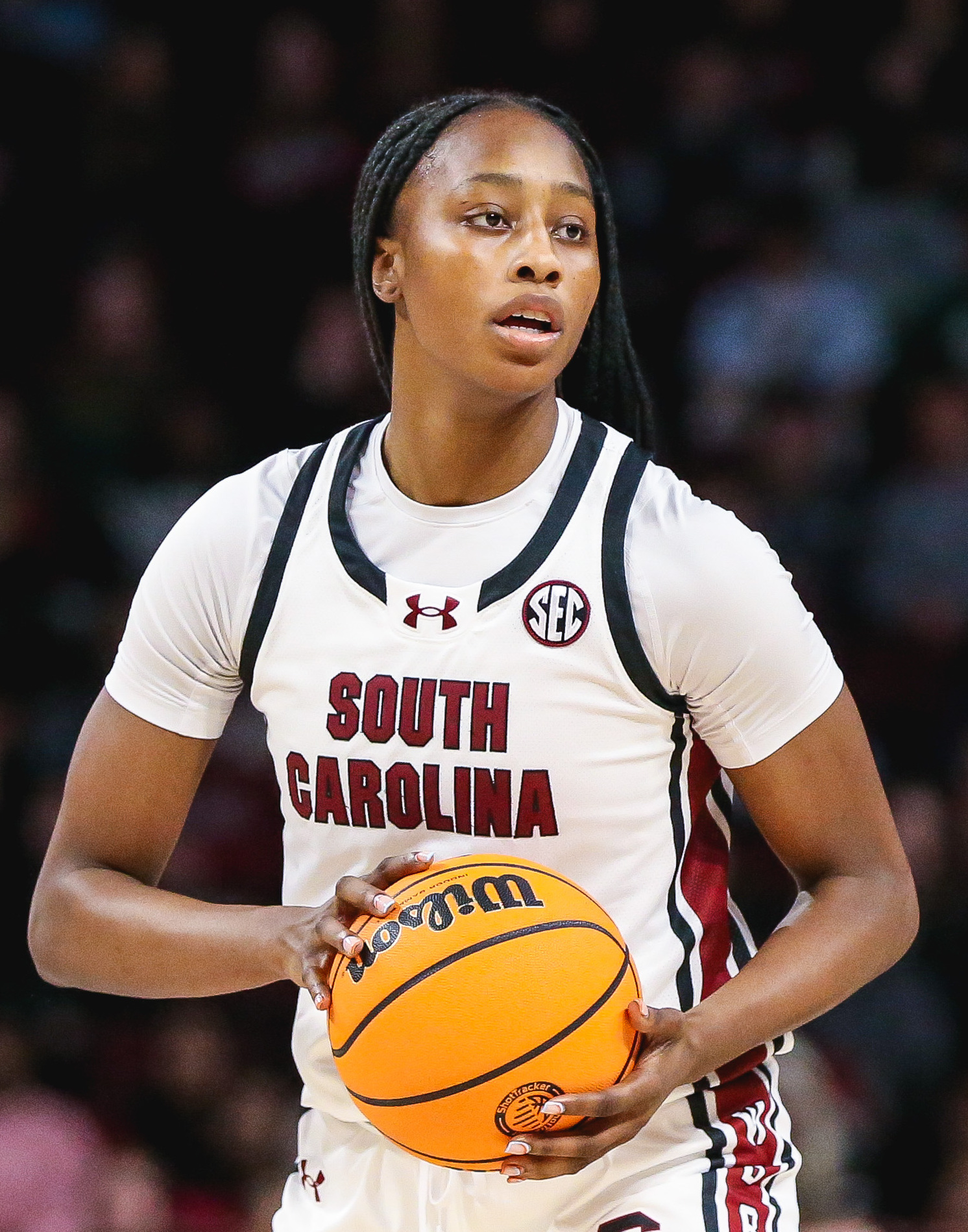
- Edwards with South Carolina in 2025

No. 8 – South Carolina Gamecocks
- Position: Forward
- League: Southeastern Conference

Personal information
- Born: January 30, 2006 (age 20)
- Listed height: 6 ft 3 in (1.91 m)

Career information
- High school: Camden (Camden, South Carolina)
- College: South Carolina (2024–present)

Career highlights
- WBCA Coaches' All-American (2026); Second-team All-American – AP, USBWA (2026); 2× First-team All-SEC (2025, 2026); SEC All-Freshman Team (2025); Gatorade National Player of the Year (2024); Morgan Wootten National Player of the Year (2024); McDonald's All-American Game Co-MVP (2024); Nike Hoop Summit (2024); Jordan Brand Classic MVP (2024); FIBA Under-18 Women's AmeriCup MVP (2024)
Medals
Representing the United States
Women's basketball
FIBA AmeriCup
Gold medal – first place	2025 Chile
FIBA Under-19 World Cup
Gold medal – first place	2023 Spain	Team
FIBA Under-18 AmeriCup
Gold medal – first place	2024 Colombia	Team
Women's 3x3 basketball
FIBA 3x3 World Cup
Gold medal – first place	2026 Warsaw	Team

Joyce Edwards (born January 30, 2006) is an American college basketball player for South Carolina. She attended Camden High School and was a five-star recruit and one of the top players in the 2024 class.

== High school career ==
Edwards attended Camden High School. During her junior year she averaged 28.5 points, 13.6 rebounds, 3.5 steals and 2.9 assists and led Camden to the 3A state championship. Following the season she was named South Carolina Gatorade Player of the Year.

During her senior year she averaged 31.3 points, 13.3 rebounds, 4.5 steals, 3.3 blocks and four assists per game and led Camden to their second consecutive 3A state championship. Following the season she was named South Carolina Gatorade Player of the Year for the second consecutive year and Gatorade National Player of the Year. She was also named Morgan Wootten National Player of the Year.

Edwards played in the 2024 McDonald's All-American Girls Game, where she scored a game-high 19 points and was named co-MVP along with Sarah Strong. She competed at the 2024 Nike Hoop Summit, where she led Team USA with 25 points, nine rebounds, and five steals. She scored 17 points in the second half, helping lead team USA to a comeback victory over the world team. She then competed at the 2024 Jordan Brand Classic, where she scored a game-high 25 points, seven rebounds, two assists, six steals and two blocks, and was named MVP.

=== Recruiting ===
Edwards was considered a five-star recruit and the number two player in the 2024 class, according to ESPN. On November 15, 2023, she signed her National Letter of Intent (NLI) to play college basketball at South Carolina, over offers from LSU and Clemson. She was the highest-rated player from South Carolina since A'ja Wilson was No. 1 in 2014.

== College career ==
On November 28, 2024, against Iowa State, Edwards scored 13 points and 11 rebounds for her first career double-double. She was subsequently named the SEC Freshman of the Week for the week ending December 3, 2024. During her freshman year, she led South Carolina in scoring, and averaged 13.0 points per game in conference play. Her .558 field goal percentage ranked fourth in the SEC. She was the Gamecocks' leading scorer in a team-high 13 games, including seven against ranked opponents. Following the season she earned first-team All-SEC and SEC all-freshman team honors. She became the third Gamecock freshman to earn first-team All-SEC honors, following A'ja Wilson in 2015 and Aliyah Boston in 2020.

On November 15, 2025, against USC, Edwards recorded 17 points and ten rebounds for her first double-double of the season. On December 7, 2025, against North Carolina Central, she recorded 25 points and ten rebounds, and career-high six assist, for her second double-double of the season. A week later on December 14, against Penn State, she scored a then career-high 29 points, and six steals, along with five assists, four rebounds, and four blocks. The next game against South Florida on December 18, 2025, she scored a career-high 34 points on 14-of-15 shooting from the field. During her sophomore year she averaged 19.6 points, and 6.3 rebounds per game. She led the team with 19 20-point games, which ranks fifth in single-season program history. Following the season she was named a first-team All-SEC honoree, becoming the ninth Gamecock to earn first-team All-SEC honors in multiple seasons and the third to accomplish this feat in her first two seasons. She was also named a second-team All-American by the AP, The Sporting News and the U.S. Basketball Writers Association (USBWA). She became the eighth sophomore in program history to earn All-American status.

== National team career ==
Edwards represented the United States at the 2023 FIBA Under-19 Women's Basketball World Cup, where she was the youngest member on the roster. During the tournament she averaged 12.6 points, 6.1 rebounds and 1.1 blocks in seven games. She was named to the all-tournament team after helping the United States win a gold medal.

On May 19, 2024, Edwards was named to team USA's roster for the 2024 FIBA Under-18 Women's AmeriCup. During the tournament she led team USA in scoring, and ranked fourth overall in the tournament, with 14.2 points per game. She also averaged 7.2 rebounds and 2 steals in six games. During the final against Canada she recorded 16 points, a team-high 13 rebounds and five steals for her second double-double of the tournament to help the United States win a gold medal. She was subsequently named tournament MVP.

On June 19, 2025, Edwards was named to team USA's roster for the 2025 FIBA Women's AmeriCup. During the tournament she averaged 9.7 points, 5.3 rebounds and 1.3 assists per game and won a gold medal.

== Career statistics ==
Legend
GP	Games played	GS	Games started	MPG	Minutes per game	RPG	Rebounds per game
APG	Assists per game	SPG	Steals per game	BPG	Blocks per game	PPG	Points per game
TO	Turnovers per game	FG%	Field-goal percentage	3P%	3-point field-goal percentage	FT%	Free-throw percentage
**Bold**	Career best	°	League leader

=== College ===
Year	Team	GP	GS	MPG	FG%	3P%	FT%	RPG	APG	SPG	BPG	TO	PPG
2024–25	South Carolina	38	1	21.2	53.5	0.0	78.5	5.0	1.2	1.1	0.5	1.7	12.7
**Career**		38	1	21.2	53.5	0.0	78.5	5.0	1.2	1.1	0.5	1.7	12.7
Statistics retrieved from Sports-Reference.
