= Mexico women's national under-19 basketball team =

National basketball team of Mexico

Mexico
- Joined FIBA: 1936
- FIBA zone: FIBA Americas
- National federation: ADEMEBA

U19 World Cup
- Appearances: 1
- Medals: None

U18 AmeriCup
- Appearances: 11
- Medals: None

U17 Centrobasket
- Appearances: 7
- Medals: (gold) Gold: 5 (2009, 2013, 2015, 2017, 2019); (silver) Silver: 2 (2011, 2023)
Home	Away

The Mexico women's national under-17, under-18 and under-19 basketball team is a national basketball team of Mexico, administered by the Asociación Deportiva Mexicana de Básquetbol. It represents the country in international under-17, under-18 and under-19 women's basketball competitions.

The 2019 team won the Under-17 Women's Centrobasket after beating Puerto Rico in the finals 61–56 and ultimately secured one of three qualifying spots for the 2020 Under-18 Women's Americas Championship, which was cancelled due to the COVID-19 pandemic.

== FIBA U17 Women's Centrobasket participations ==
Year	Result
2009	1st place, gold medalist(s)
2011	2nd place, silver medalist(s)
2013	1st place, gold medalist(s)
2015	1st place, gold medalist(s)
2017	1st place, gold medalist(s)
2019	1st place, gold medalist(s)
2023	2nd place, silver medalist(s)

== FIBA Under-18 Women's AmeriCup participations ==
Year	Result
1992	7th
1996	6th
2000	7th
2010	6th
2012	7th
2014	7th

Year	Result
2016	5th
2018	7th
2022	5th
2024	7th
2026	5th

== FIBA Under-19 Women's Basketball World Cup participations ==
Year	Result
2017	12th

== See also ==
- Mexico women's national basketball team
- Mexico women's national under-17 basketball team
- Mexico men's national under-19 basketball team
