= Cotie McMahon =

American basketball player

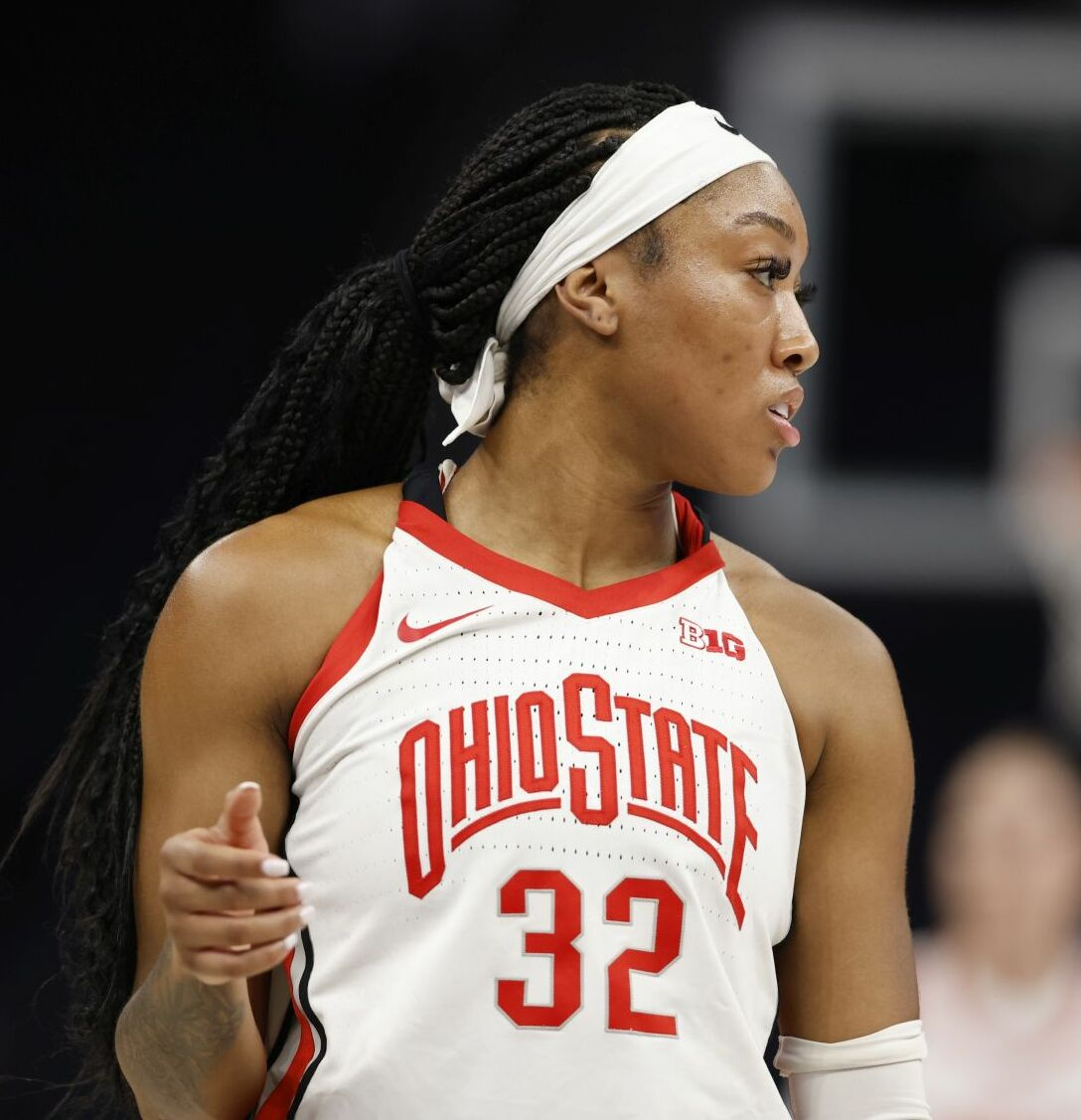
- McMahon with Ohio State in 2023

No. 23 – Washington Mystics
- Position: Guard
- League: WNBA

Personal information
- Born: May 4, 2004 (age 22) Dayton, Ohio, U.S.
- Listed height: 6 ft 0 in (1.83 m)
- Listed weight: 203 lb (92 kg)

Career information
- High school: Centerville (Centerville, Ohio)
- College: Ohio State (2022–2025); Ole Miss (2025–2026)
- WNBA draft: 2026: 1st round, 11th overall pick
- Drafted by: Washington Mystics
- Playing career: 2026–present

Career history
- 2026–present: Washington Mystics

Career highlights
- Second-team All-American – TSN (2026); First-team All-SEC (2026); 2× First-team All-Big Ten (2024, 2025); Second-team All-Big Ten (2023); Big Ten Freshman of the Year (2023); Big Ten All-Freshman Team (2023)
- Stats at Basketball Reference
Medals
Women's 3x3 basketball
Representing the United States
FIBA 3x3 Under-23 World Cup
Gold medal – first place	2024 Ulaanbaatar	Team
Women's basketball
Representing the United States
FIBA Under-19 World Cup
Gold medal – first place	2023 Spain	Team
FIBA Under-18 Americas Championship
Gold medal – first place	2022 Argentina	Team

Cotie McMahon (born May 4, 2004) is an American professional basketball player for the Washington Mystics of the Women's National Basketball Association (WNBA). McMahon played college basketball for the Ole Miss Rebels of the Southeastern Conference and the Ohio State Buckeyes where she was named Big Ten Freshman of the Year in 2023.

== High school career ==
McMahon played basketball for Centerville High School in Centerville, Ohio. As a junior, she led her team to a Greater Western Ohio Conference title. In addition to basketball, McMahon competed in track and field in high school. She was rated a four-star recruit by ESPN and received her first NCAA Division I scholarship offer from Xavier in seventh grade. She committed to play college basketball for Ohio State and opted to graduate early from high school.

== College career ==
McMahon enrolled early at Ohio State, at age 17, and did not play or travel with the team in her first semester. As a freshman, she was named second-team All-Big Ten and Big Ten Freshman of the Year. McMahon was a six-time Big Ten Freshman of the Week, which tied the program record held by Kelsey Mitchell. As a freshman, she averaged 15.1 points, 5.5 rebounds and 2.4 assists per game, helping her team reach the Elite Eight of the 2023 NCAA tournament.

In her sophomore season, McMahon led the team in rebounds per game. On January 21 2024, McMahon scored a double-double overtime win against Iowa, with a career-high 33 points and season-high 12 rebounds. She earned player of the week honors from the Big Ten, Naismith, and AP. On January 28 2024, she had a double-double against Purdue with 10 points, a season-high 12 rebounds, and career-high eight assists. In the postseason, McMahon was named to the All-Big Ten first-team, and an Honorable Mention All-American by AP and USBWA. She scored her 1,000th career point in the NCAA Tournament against Duke on March 24, 2024.

As a junior, McMahon averaged 16.5 points, 4.7 rebounds, and 2.1 assists, leading the team in points. She repeated honors for first-team All-Big Ten, and was an Honorable Mention All-American by WBCA. At the end of the season, McMahon transferred to Ole Miss.

== National team career ==
McMahon played for the United States at the 2022 FIBA Under-18 Women's Americas Championship in Argentina. She helped her team win the gold medal after scoring 22 points against Canada in the final. McMahon averaged 12.6 points and 8.6 rebounds per game, earning all-tournament team honors. She won another gold medal at the 2023 FIBA Under-19 World Cup in Spain, averaging 8.9 points, 4.1 rebounds and 2.4 assists per game in the tournament. In the final, McMahon scored 16 points and made the go-ahead basket in a 69–66 win over Spain.

== Career statistics ==
Legend
GP	Games played	GS	Games started	MPG	Minutes per game	RPG	Rebounds per game
APG	Assists per game	SPG	Steals per game	BPG	Blocks per game	PPG	Points per game
TO	Turnovers per game	FG%	Field-goal percentage	3P%	3-point field-goal percentage	FT%	Free-throw percentage
**Bold**	Career best	°	League leader

=== College ===
Year	Team	GP	GS	MPG	FG%	3P%	FT%	RPG	APG	SPG	BPG	TO	PPG
2022–23	Ohio State	**36**	**36**	29.1	**51.0**	26.3	67.7	5.5	2.4	**1.6**	**0.7**	2.9	15.1
2023–24	Ohio State	32	32	29.1	46.0	23.0	62.3	**6.3**	2.1	1.1	0.5	2.5	14.4
2024–25	Ohio State	29	29	**32.7**	44.4	**37.4**	63.9	4.7	2.1	1.2	0.2	**2.3**	16.5
2025–26	Ole Miss	**36**	**36**	30.0	45.1	28.6	**73.5**	5.1	**3.0**	1.1	0.4	2.8	**19.5**
**Career**		133	133	30.1	46.5	29.6	67.5	5.4	2.4	1.3	0.5	2.6	16.4
Statistics retrieved from Sports-Reference.

== Off the court ==
Before her freshman season at Ohio State, McMahon signed a name, image and likeness deal with Berry Blendz. She earned a percentage of proceeds from every purchase of the "Cotie Crossover" smoothie sold by the store.
