= 2022 FIBA Under-18 Women's Americas Championship =

13th FIBA Under-18 Women's Americas Basketball Championship

Tournament details
- Host country: Argentina
- City: Buenos Aires
- Dates: 13–19 June
- Teams: 8 (from 1 confederation)
- Venue: 1 (in 1 host city)

Final positions
- Champions: United States (11th title)
- Runners-up: Canada
- Third place: Argentina

Tournament statistics
- MVP: (United States) Kiki Rice
- Top scorer: (Canada) Todd (15.2)
- Top rebounds: (Canada) Dykstra (11)
- Top assists: (United States) Rice (4)
- PPG (Team): United States (87.2)
- RPG (Team): United States (58.8)
- APG (Team): United States (22.3)

Official website
- www.fiba.basketball/history

The 2022 FIBA Under-18 Women's Americas Championship was the thirteenth edition of the FIBA Under-18 Women's Americas Championship, the biennial international under-18 basketball tournament that was held from 13 to 19 June 2022 in Buenos Aires, Argentina. This also served as the qualifying tournament for FIBA Americas in the 2023 FIBA Under-19 Women's Basketball World Cup in Spain.

== Host selection ==
On 9 May 2022, FIBA Americas decided to grant Argentina the hosting rights for the FIBA U18 Americas Women's Championship. The tournament will take place from June 13 to 19 at the Estadio Obras Sanitarias in the city of Buenos Aires. The tournament was played again after the last edition held in 2018, since the 2020 event was canceled due to the COVID-19 pandemic. This was the third time that Argentina hosted the continental under-18 tournament, and the second time for Buenos Aires after hosting the event in 2008.

== Participating teams ==
- North America:
1. United States
2. Canada
- Central America/Caribbean:
1. Puerto Rico
2. Mexico
3. El Salvador
- South America: (2022 FIBA U18 Women's South American Championship in Buenos Aires, Argentina, 3–9 April 2022)
1. Brazil
2. Argentina (Hosts)
3. Colombia

== Preliminary round ==
The draw was held on 16 May 2022 in FIBA Americas Regional Office in San Juan, Puerto Rico.

All times are local (UTC-3).

=== Group A ===
Pos	Team	Pld	W	L	PF	PA	PD	Pts	Qualification
1	Canada	3	3	0	237	133	+104	6	Advance to Quarterfinals
2	Brazil	3	2	1	156	170	−14	5	Advance to Quarterfinals
3	Argentina (H)	3	1	2	156	196	−40	4	Advance to Quarterfinals
4	Mexico	3	0	3	149	199	−50	3	Advance to Quarterfinals

Updated to match(es) played on 14 June 2022. Source: FIBA Americas
Rules for classification: 1) Points; 2) Head-to-head results; 3) Points difference; 4) Points scored.
(H) Hosts

13 June 2022
18:00

Boxscore

Canada	68–40	Mexico
Scoring by quarter: 15–13, 21–11, 19–10, 13–6
Pts: Todd 16; Rebs: Dykstra 11; Asts: Bascoe 7		Pts: Jeffries 9 Rebs: Ceja 7 Asts: Ceja 4

Estadio Obras Sanitarias, Buenos Aires
Referees:
Carlos Andrés Vélez Londono
Yuliet Mendez Álvarez
Daniel Ronald Jiménez Choque

13 June 2022
20:30

Boxscore

Argentina	34–54	Brazil
Scoring by quarter: 13–7, 8–18, 6–12, 7–17
Pts: Bourgarel 7 Rebs: Tribouley 8 Asts: Maggi 3		Pts: Gonçalves 21; Rebs: Queiroz 14; Asts: de Oliveira 4

Estadio Obras Sanitarias, Buenos Aires
Referees:
Jesús López
Erick Endara Estevez
Williset Ernesto Del Valle Montalvo

14 June 2022
18:00

Boxscore

Brazil	38–80	Canada
Scoring by quarter: 8–22, 17–16, 7–25, 6–17
Pts: de Oliveira 13; Rebs: Queiroz 11; Asts: de Oliveira 2		Pts: Todd 15; Rebs: Dykstra 15; Asts: Bascoe 6

Estadio Obras Sanitarias, Buenos Aires
Referees:
Carlos Andrés Vélez Londono
Erick Endara Estevez
Aline García

14 June 2022
20:30

Boxscore

Mexico	53–67	Argentina
Scoring by quarter: 13–13, 8–21, 19–15, 13–18
Pts: Jeffreis 14; Rebs: Yañez 12; Asts: Maciel 3		Pts: Tapari 17; Rebs: Tribouley 8 Asts: Bourgarel 5

Estadio Obras Sanitarias, Buenos Aires
Referees:
Enzo Piero Fernández Valenzuela
Yuliet Mendez Álvarez
Williset Ernesto Del Valle Montalvo

15 June 2022
18:00

Boxscore

Brazil	64–56	Mexico
Scoring by quarter: 11–14, 19–15, 18–13, 16–14
Pts: Da Silva 18; Rebs: Queiroz 11; Asts: Queiroz 5		Pts: Navarro 17; Rebs: Yañez 10; Asts: Maciel 5

Estadio Obras Sanitarias, Buenos Aires
Referees:
Carlos Andrés Vélez Londono
Yuliet Mendez Álvarez
Enzo Piero Fernández Valenzuela

15 June 2022
20:30

Boxscore

Canada	89–55	Argentina
Scoring by quarter: 26–23, 24–13, 19–9, 10–10
Pts: Todd 17; Rebs: Dykstra 13; Asts: Hylton 7		Pts: Giacone 14; Rebs: Tribouley 9 Asts: Espedale 4

Estadio Obras Sanitarias, Buenos Aires
Referees:
Jesús López
Williset Ernesto Del Valle Montalvo
Erick Endara Estevez

=== Group B ===
Pos	Team	Pld	W	L	PF	PA	PD	Pts	Qualification
1	United States	3	3	0	280	98	+182	6	Advance to Quarterfinals
2	Colombia	3	2	1	150	170	−20	5	Advance to Quarterfinals
3	Puerto Rico	3	1	2	153	195	−42	4	Advance to Quarterfinals
4	El Salvador	3	0	3	114	234	−120	3	Advance to Quarterfinals

Updated to match(es) played on 15 June 2022. Source: FIBA Americas
Rules for classification: 1) Points; 2) Head-to-head results; 3) Points difference; 4) Points scored.

13 June 2022
13:00

Boxscore

El Salvador	44–65	Puerto Rico
Scoring by quarter: 18–18, 4–10, 7–17, 15–20
Pts: Laguan 15; Rebs: Alfaro 8 Asts: Alfaro, Ayala 3		Pts: Crespo 16; Rebs: Rosado 8 Asts: Delgado, De Pool 4

Estadio Obras Sanitarias, Buenos Aires
Referees:
Hortencia del Soccoro Sanchez
Larissa Sales
Kelsey Kisilevich

13 June 2022
15:30

Boxscore

United States	81–29	Colombia
Scoring by quarter: 20–7, 14–11, 20–2, 27–9
Pts: Brady 17; Rebs: Del Rosario 11; Asts: Rice 7		Pts: Moscarella 6 Rebs: Suárez 6 Asts: Salguedo 4

Estadio Obras Sanitarias, Buenos Aires
Referees:
Micaela Prado (ARG)
Enzo Piero Fernández Valenzuela (CHI)
Aline García (URU)

14 June 2022
13:00

Boxscore

Colombia	63–39	El Salvador
Scoring by quarter: 13–5, 7–14, 16–13, 27–7
Pts: Salguedo 14; Rebs: Castaño, Suárez 8 Asts: Salguedo 7		Pts: Alfaro 13; Rebs: Laguan, Ruiz 5 Asts: Alfaro 5

Estadio Obras Sanitarias, Buenos Aires
Referees:
Micaela Prado (ARG)
Kelsey Kisilevich (CAN)
Larissa Sales Rodrigues

14 June 2022
15:30

Boxscore

Puerto Rico	38–93	United States
Scoring by quarter: 12–12, 12–25, 9–27, 5–29
Pts: Crespo 13; Rebs: Carreno 7 Asts: Delgado 3		Pts: McMahon 15; Rebs: Del Rosario 12; Asts: Pissott 6

Estadio Obras Sanitarias, Buenos Aires
Referees:
Hortencia del Soccoro Sanchez Carrizales
Jesús López (MEX)
Daniel Ronald Jiménez Choque (BOL)

15 June 2022
13:00

Boxscore

Puerto Rico	50–58	Colombia
Scoring by quarter: 12–15, 15–13, 14–12, 9–18
Pts: Crespo 12; Rebs: Delgado, Rivera 5 Asts: Crespo 3		Pts: Montaño 13; Rebs: Montaño 12; Asts: Montaño, Rodríguez 4

Estadio Obras Sanitarias, Buenos Aires
Referees:
Hortencia del Soccoro Sanchez
Kelsey Kisilevich
Daniel Ronald Jiménez Choque

15 June 2022
15:30

Boxscore

United States	106–31	El Salvador
Scoring by quarter: 24–6, 36–6, 24–13, 22–6
Pts: Brady 20; Rebs: Del Rosario 14; Asts: McMahon 8		Pts: Alfaro 10; Rebs: Alfaro 4 Asts: Alfaro, García 2

Estadio Obras Sanitarias, Buenos Aires
Referees:
Micaela Prado (ARG)
Aline García (URU)
Larissa Sales Rodrigues

== Knockout stage ==
=== Bracket ===
Fifth place
2B	Colombia	39
4A	Mexico	64
Seventh place
4B	El Salvador	32
3B	Puerto Rico	57

5–8th place semifinals
4B	El Salvador	37
2B	Colombia	58
3B	Puerto Rico	44
4A	Mexico	72

Quarterfinals
1A	Canada	92
4B	El Salvador	24
3A	Argentina	64
2B	Colombia	55
2A	Brazil	73
3B	Puerto Rico	53
4A	Mexico	41
1B	United States	77

Semifinals
1A	Canada	78
3A	Argentina	63
2A	Brazil	40
1B	United States	84

Final
1A	Canada	77
1B	United States	82
Third place
3A	Argentina	55
2A	Brazil	50

=== Quarterfinals ===
17 June 2022
13:00

Boxscore

United States	77–41	Mexico
Scoring by quarter: 29–8, 18–8, 17–17, 13–8
Pts: McMahon 21; Rebs: Brady 11; Asts: Rice 6		Pts: Jeffries, Moreno 12; Rebs: Yañez 8 Asts: Jeffries, Maciel 3

Estadio Obras Sanitarias, Buenos Aires
Referees:
Jesús López (MEX)
Enzo Piero Fernández Valenzuela (CHI)
Daniel Ronald Jiménez Choque (BOL)

17 June 2022
15:30

Boxscore

Brazil	73–53	Puerto Rico
Scoring by quarter: 28–8, 12-15, 17–10, 16–20
Pts: Queiroz 18; Rebs: Queiroz 14; Asts: Queiroz 5		Pts: Muñoz 14; Rebs: Torres 7 Asts: Muñoz 4

Estadio Obras Sanitarias, Buenos Aires
Referees:
Carlos Andrés Vélez Londono (COL)
Micaela Prado (ARG)
Kelsey Kisilevich (CAN)

17 June 2022
18:00

Boxscore

Canada	92–24	El Salvador
Scoring by quarter: 25–12, 24–3, 24–8, 19–1
Pts: Diakhaté 14; Rebs: Diakhaté 12; Asts: Hilton 4		Pts: Ayala 4 Rebs: Rivas 8 Asts: Ruiz 3

Estadio Obras Sanitarias, Buenos Aires
Referees:
Williset Ernesto Del Valle Montalvo
Aline García (URU)
Erick Endara Estevez

17 June 2022
20:30

Boxscore

Colombia	55–64	Argentina
Scoring by quarter: 9–15, 19–18, 14–19, 13–12
Pts: Gomez 23; Rebs: Camilo 7 Asts: Rodríguez 5		Pts: Tapari 14; Rebs: Fernández 8 Asts: Tapari 3

Estadio Obras Sanitarias, Buenos Aires
Referees:
Hortencia del Soccoro Sanchez
Yuliet Mendez Álvarez (CUB)
Kelsey Kisilevich (CAN)

=== 5–8th place semifinals ===
18 June 2022
13:00

Boxscore

El Salvador	37–58	Colombia
Scoring by quarter: 9–12, 12–17, 12–8, 4–21
Pts: Alfaro 13; Rebs: Ruiz 6 Asts: Alfaro 2		Pts: Moscarella 22; Rebs: Moscarella 11; Asts: Moscarella 3

Estadio Obras Sanitarias, Buenos Aires
Referees:
Kelsey Kisilevich (CAN)
Enzo Piero Fernández Valenzuela (CHI)
Daniel Ronald Jiménez Choque (BOL)

18 June 2022
15:30

Boxscore

Puerto Rico	44–72	Mexico
Scoring by quarter: 6–19, 15–15, 13–21, 10–17
Pts: Crespo 22; Rebs: Hernández 15; Asts: three players 1		Pts: Navarro 18; Rebs: Yañez 15; Asts: Jeffreis 4

Estadio Obras Sanitarias, Buenos Aires
Referees:
Micaela Prado (ARG)
Erick Endara Estevez (ECU)
Larissa Sales Rodrigues (BRA)

=== Semifinals ===
18 June 2022
18:00

Boxscore

United States	84–40	Brazil
Scoring by quarter: 18–6, 17–7, 28–13, 21–14
Pts: Rice 22; Rebs: VanSlooten 10; Asts: Jones 5		Pts: de Oliveira 10; Rebs: Alves 7 Asts: de Oliveira, Queiroz 2

Estadio Obras Sanitarias, Buenos Aires
Referees:
Carlos Andrés Vélez Londono (COL)
Aline García (URU)
Yuliet Mendez Álvarez (CUB)

18 June 2022
20:30

Boxscore

Argentina	63–78	Canada
Scoring by quarter: 16–29, 9–15, 22–19, 16–15
Pts: V. Maggi 11; Rebs: Giacone 7 Asts: Bourgarel 6		Pts: Todd 14; Rebs: Rowe 10; Asts: Asare 4

Estadio Obras Sanitarias, Buenos Aires
Referees:
Hortencia del Soccoro Sanchez Carrizales (MEX)
Jesús López (VEN)
Williset Ernesto Del Valle Montalvo (PUR)

=== Seventh place game ===
19 June 2022
13:00

Boxscore

El Salvador	32–57	Puerto Rico
Scoring by quarter: 9–16, 9–11, 9–14, 5–16
Pts: Alfaro 16; Rebs: García 17; Asts: García, Alfaro 2		Pts: Torres, De Pool 9 Rebs: Escribano 10; Asts: Hernández 4

Estadio Obras Sanitarias, Buenos Aires
Referees:
Carlos Andrés Vélez Londono (COL)
Erick Endara Estevez (ECU)
Daniel Ronald Jiménez Choque (BOL)

=== Fifth place game ===
19 June 2022
15:30

Boxscore

Colombia	39–64	Mexico
Scoring by quarter: 12–20, 7–22, 15–11, 5–11
Pts: Rodríguez 13; Rebs: Camilo, Rodríguez 9 Asts: Castro, Moscarella 2		Pts: Navarro 21; Rebs: Yañez 7 Asts: Moreno 3

Estadio Obras Sanitarias, Buenos Aires
Referees:
Aline García (URU)
Enzo Piero Fernández Valenzuela (CHI)
Yuliet Mendez Álvarez (CUB)

=== Third place game ===
19 June 2022
18:00

Boxscore

Argentina	55–50 (OT)	Brazil
Scoring by quarter: 10–10, 6–9, 12–8, 8–9, Overtime: 7–7, 12-7
Pts: Tribouley 13; Rebs: Fernández 10; Asts: three players 2		Pts: Francisco de Oliveira 14; Rebs: Da Silva 15; Asts: Gonçalves, de Oliveira 5

Estadio Obras Sanitarias, Buenos Aires
Referees:
Kelsey Kisilevich (CAN)
Jesús López (VEN)
Williset Ernesto Del Valle Montalvo (PUR)

=== Final ===
19 June 2022
20:30

Boxscore

Canada	77–82	United States
Scoring by quarter: 16–20, 15–21, 22–16, 24–25
Pts: Todd 19; Rebs: Dykstra 5 Asts: Dykstra 5		Pts: Hilton 22; Rebs: Brady 15; Asts: McMahon 3

Estadio Obras Sanitarias, Buenos Aires
Referees:
Hortencia del Soccoro Sanchez Carrizales (MEX)
Micaela Prado (ARG)
Larissa Sales Rodrigues (BRA)

== Statistics and awards ==
=== Awards ===
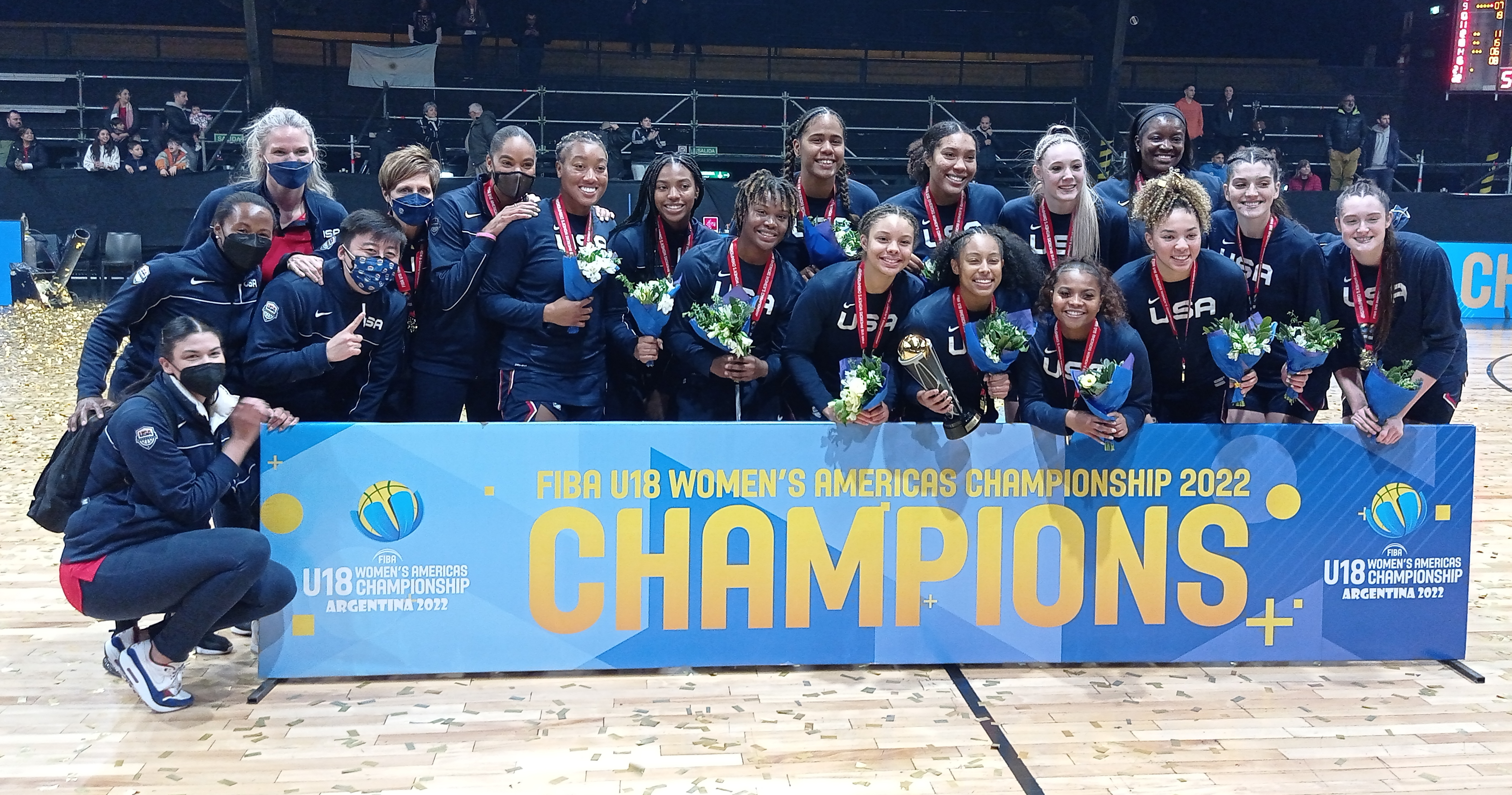
The US team at the awards ceremony

2022 FIBA Americas Under-18 Women's
Championship winners

United States
11th title

Most Valuable Player
(United States) Kira Rice

All Tournament Team

- (United States) Kira Rice
- (Brazil) Ana Paula de Oliveira
- (Canada) T'yana Todd
- (United States) Cotie McMahon
- (Argentina) Lara Tribouley

== Final ranking ==
Qualified for the 2023 FIBA Under-19 Women's Basketball World Cup

Rank	Team	Record
1st place, gold medalist(s)	United States	6–0
2nd place, silver medalist(s)	Canada	5–1
3rd place, bronze medalist(s)	Argentina	3–3
4	Brazil	3–3
5	Mexico	2–4
6	Colombia	3–3
7	Puerto Rico	2–4
8	El Salvador	0–6
