= Sedona Prince =

American basketball player (born 2000)

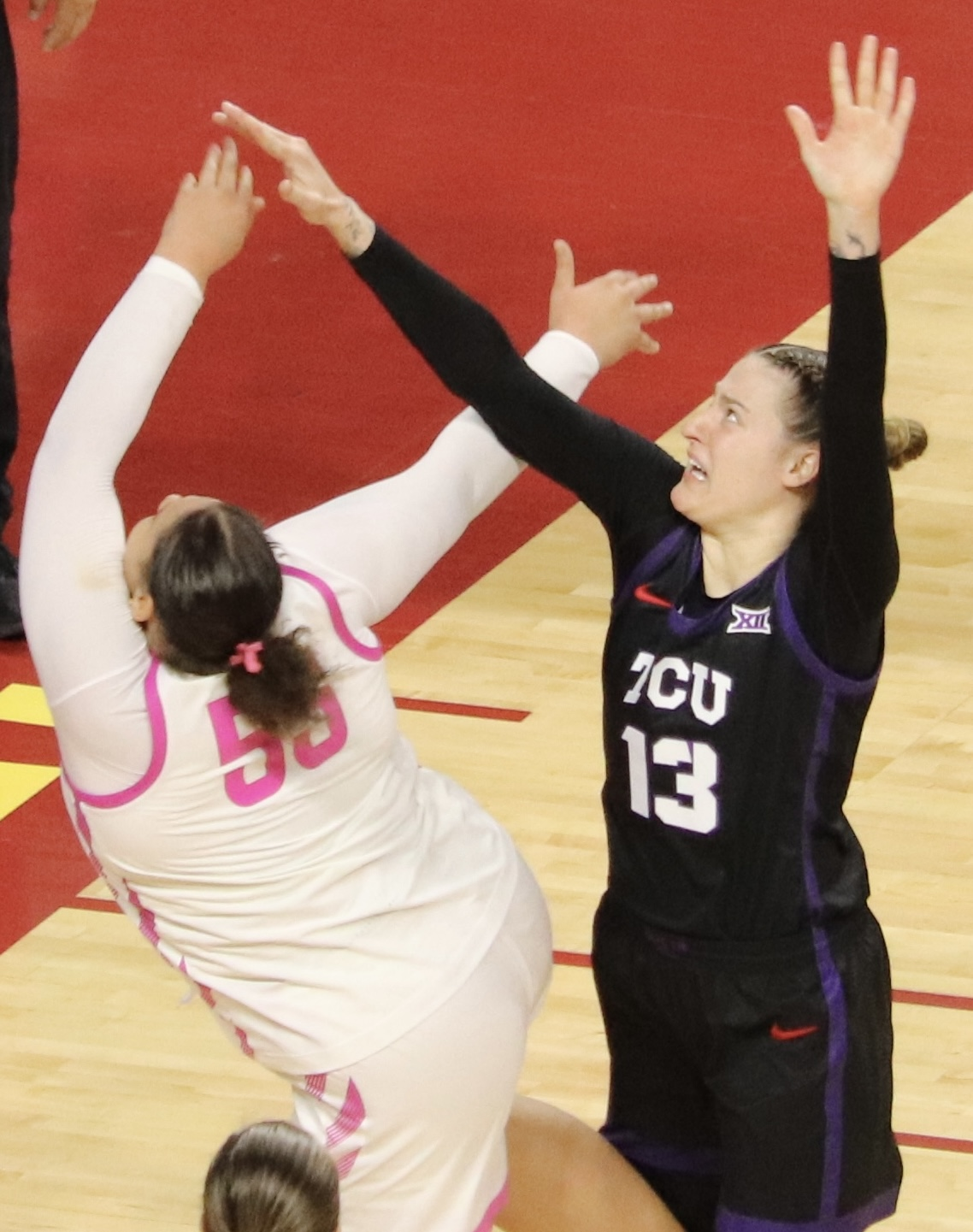
- Prince (right) with the Horned Frogs in 2025

No. 77 – Panathinaikos
- Position: Power forward / center
- League: Greek League

Personal information
- Born: May 12, 2000 (age 26) Hemet, California, U.S.
- Listed height: 6 ft 7 in (2.01 m)
- Listed weight: 265 lb (120 kg)

Career information
- High school: Liberty Hill (Liberty Hill, Texas)
- College: Oregon (2019–2022); TCU (2023–2025)
- WNBA draft: 2025: undrafted
- Playing career: 2025–present

Career history
- 2025: Al Riyadi Club Beirut
- 2025–present: Panathinaikos

Career highlights
- First-team All-Big 12 (2025); Big 12 All-Defensive Team (2025); McDonald's All-American (2018)
Medals
Women's basketball
the United States
FIBA AmeriCup
Gold medal – first place	2021 Puerto Rico	Team
FIBA Americas U18 Championship
Gold medal – first place	2018 Mexico City	Team
FIBA U17 World Cup
Bronze medal – third place	2016 Spain	Team
FIBA Americas Under-16 Championship
Bronze medal – third place	2015 Mexico	Team

Sedona Prince (born May 12, 2000) is an American basketball player who plays for the Greek women's basketball team Panathinaikos of the Greek Women's Basketball League. She (Note: Prince uses both she/her and they/them pronouns. This article uses she/her pronouns for consistency.) played college basketball for the Oregon Ducks of the Pac-12 Conference, and the Texas Longhorns and TCU Horned Frogs of the Big 12 Conference. (Note: Texas joined the Southeastern Conference in 2024, in advance of Prince's final college season at TCU.) At 6 ft 7 in (201 cm), she was one of the tallest players to ever play for Oregon . Prince generated national attention in 2021 after highlighting the disparity in facilities between the men's and women's NCAA tournaments. She was not allowed to compete during the 2019–2020 NCAA season due to then-current NCAA transfer rules requiring her to sit out a season. Prince was also one of the lead plaintiffs in the House v. NCAA legal case, whose settlement, reached in 2024 and approved in 2025, led to the establishment of a formal revenue-sharing model in NCAA Division I sports.

== Early life and high school ==
Born in Hemet, California and raised in Liberty Hill, Texas, Prince began playing basketball in the fourth grade. Prince stated that she was bullied for her height and transferred to Faith Academy of Marble Falls because of the bullying, but she transferred back to Liberty Hill High School, where she was a three-year varsity player. She committed to playing college basketball at Texas, who first extended an offer to Prince when she was in the eighth grade.

== College career ==
=== Texas ===
Prince redshirted her true freshman season while recovering from a broken right leg suffered at the FIBA Americas U18 Championships. According to her mother Tambra, the athletic trainers at Texas urged her to prepare for the upcoming season, having her do exercises a month after her surgery, leading to her suffering a setback and nearly dying from an infection and the antibiotics she was taking to combat it. Prince announced she would transfer to Oregon to continue her collegiate career, with reports stating that disagreements with the Texas medical staff were the main reason for the transfer.

=== Oregon ===
Prince applied for a hardship waiver to grant her immediate eligibility for the 2019–20 season, but her waiver and appeal were denied, leading to her sitting out the season instead.

She missed the entire 2022–23 season due to a broken elbow. After the season, she declared for the 2023 WNBA draft, but later withdrew her name from consideration.

=== TCU ===
Prince entered the NCAA transfer portal in 2023, enrolling at Texas Christian University (TCU) as a graduate student and signing with Horned Frogs women's basketball roster in April. In February 2025, Prince helped TCU achieve its highest ranking ever.

== Professional career ==
Prince signed with Al Riyadi of the Women's Lebanese Basketball League on May 7, 2025.

== National team career ==
Prince has represented the United States, starting at the 2015 FIBA Americas U16 Championship where she was a part of the team that won bronze. She also won bronze representing the U17 national team at the 2016 FIBA U17 World Cup.

Prince was a part of the United States women's national under-19 basketball team at the 2018 FIBA Under-18 Women's Americas Championship, where she broke her leg during a game in the preliminary round, causing her to miss her true freshman season. Despite the injury, she still earned a gold medal as the United States won the FIBA Americas championship over Canada.

Prince was named a finalist for the 2021 FIBA Women's AmeriCup roster in April, and she was officially named to the roster in June.

== Gender equity advocacy ==
While at Oregon, she highlighted the NCAA for "its inequitable treatment of women's sports when compared to men's sports". During the 2021 NCAA Division I women's basketball tournament, Prince posted a video on TikTok pointing out the "stark contrast in amenities for male and female athletes". Prince's video went viral and led to the NCAA commissioning a gender equity report, which directly referenced Prince's video. The NCAA also made changes to its 2022 March Madness tournament, ushering in "branding for the women's tournament, increasing promotion and creating gift packages and lounges that were identical to those for the men's teams.

In 2025, Steven Johnson of the Fort Worth Star-Telegram wrote that "Prince is considered a trailblazer for her efforts to bring equity to women's college athletics".

== Career statistics ==
Legend
GP	Games played	GS	Games started	MPG	Minutes per game	RPG	Rebounds per game
APG	Assists per game	SPG	Steals per game	BPG	Blocks per game	PPG	Points per game
TO	Turnovers per game	FG%	Field-goal percentage	3P%	3-point field-goal percentage	FT%	Free-throw percentage
**Bold**	Career best	°	League leader

=== College ===
Year	Team	GP	GS	MPG	FG%	3P%	FT%	RPG	APG	SPG	BPG	TO	PPG
2018–19	Texas	(redshirt) Redshirted											
2019–20	Oregon	1	0	.0	–	–	–	.0	.0	.0	.0	**.0**	.0
2020–21	Oregon	19	10	19.8	.545	.286	**.800**	3.9	1.3	.6	1.5	.8	10.4
2021–22	Oregon	30	18	22.1	.542	.000	.746	4.9	1.4	.5	1.3	1.0	9.3
2023–24	TCU	21	21	**33.2**	.552	**.357**	.719	**9.7**	1.9	.8	2.9	2.5	**19.7**
2024–25	TCU	**37**	**37**	32.5	**.583**	.200	.728	9.4	**2.4**	**.9**	**3.0**	1.9	17.2
**Career**	5 years, 2 teams	108	86	27.2	.562	.286	.735	7.1	1.8	0.7	2.2	1.5	14.1
Statistics retrieved from Sports-Reference.

== Personal life ==
Prince is the daughter of James and Tambra Prince. James is a retired Marine, while Tambra played basketball and volleyball at St. John's College in Kansas. She also has an older brother, Diego.

=== Sexual assault allegations ===
Since 2019, Prince has been accused by four women "of either assault or sexual assault." One of Prince's former partners filed, and later dropped, a lawsuit against her accusing her of sexual assault. Molly Hensley-Clancy of The Washington Post wrote that "Prince asked two women who later accused her of domestic violence to sign nondisclosure agreements, according to police records and an ex-girlfriend. Prince also threatened legal action against women who have spoken about her on social media".

In August 2024, one of Prince's former girlfriends, Olivia Stabile, posted a series of TikTok videos accusing Prince of physical and verbal abuse. Included in the posts were accusations of Prince shoving her to the ground and threatening to sue Stabile if she were to go public about the incident. Prince stated that the allegations are "false, defamatory and misleading." No charges have been filed. A Change.org petition calling to have Prince removed from TCU's roster collected over 164,000 signatures, though her status with the team remained intact and the university declined to give an official statement.

In January 2025, Prince and an ex-girlfriend were "involved in a physical altercation;" Prince sustained a black eye. Ultimately, Fort Worth police stated that "The only evidence consistent with both accounts is that there was a physical altercation and both parties sustained minimal injuries. [The ex-girlfriend] agreed that going to [Prince]'s house was a bad idea considering [Prince] told her she did not want to speak. Once she arrived and was allowed into the house the sequence of events as well as who initiated the physical contact is unclear."

Despite being ranked amongst the top 10 prospects in the 2025 WNBA Draft, Prince went undrafted.
