= Josh Oppenheimer =

American-Israeli basketball player and coach

Josh Oppenheimer ג'וש אופנהיימר
FC Bayern Munich Basketball
- Title: Assistant Coach
- League: SEC

Personal information
- Born: January 15, 1969 (age 57)
- Listed height: 6 ft 2 in (1.88 m)

Career information
- High school: Notre Dame (Sherman Oaks, California)
- College: Rhode Island (1987–1989); Northern Arizona (1989–1991); CSU Dominguez Hills (1991–1992)
- NBA draft: 1992: undrafted
- Playing career: 1992–1998
- Position: Point guard
- Coaching career: 1998–present

Career history

Playing
- Atlanta Trojans
- Philadelphia Spirit
- Palm Beach Stingrays
- Cedar Rapids Silver Bullets
- 1995–1996: Maccabi Tel Aviv
- 1996–1998: Elitzur Givat Shmuel
- Maccabi Raanana
- Hapoel Zevat
- Maccabi Jerusalem

Coaching
- 1998–2000: Duquesne (assistant)
- 2000–2002: Delaware (assistant)
- 2002–2005: DePaul (assistant)
- 2005–2008: Kent State (assistant)
- 2013–2016: Milwaukee Bucks (assistant)
- 2016–2017: Houston Rockets (assistant)
- 2017–2018: Long Island Nets (assistant)
- 2019–2020: James Madison (assistant)
- 2020–2024: Milwaukee Bucks (assistant)
- 2022: Greece (assistant)
- 2024–2025: Oklahoma (assistant)
- 2025–present: Bayern Munich (assistant)

Career highlights
- As player: Israeli Basketball Premier League champion (1996); As assistant coach: NBA champion (2021)

Josh Oppenheimer (Hebrew: ג'וש אופנהיימר; born January 15, 1969) is an American-Israeli professional basketball coach and former player. He was most recently an assistant coach for the Milwaukee Bucks of the National Basketball Association (NBA), and the Greek Basketball National team.

== Playing career ==
Oppenheimer played collegiately for Rhode Island and later Northern Arizona before embarking on a professional career in the United States and Europe. He spent two summers in the United States Basketball League playing for Atlanta, Philadelphia and Palm Beach and also logged a season in the Continental Basketball Association with Cedar Rapids. He also played the NBA Summer League and attended training camp with the Atlanta Hawks, the Los Angeles Clippers and the Sacramento Kings respectively. Oppenheimer spent six seasons in the Israeli Basketball Premier League.

== Coaching career ==
Oppenheimer has coaching experience in the college ranks from Duquesne, Delaware, DePaul and Kent State.

=== NBA ===
In 2013, Oppenheimer joined the Milwaukee Bucks coaching staff of head coach Larry Drew. At the start of the 2016–17 NBA season, the Houston Rockets added Oppenheimer to their coaching staff as an assistant coach.

At the start of the 2017–18 NBA G League season, the Brooklyn Nets added Oppenheimer to the Long Island Nets coaching staff as an assistant coach.

On August 15, 2019, it was announced that added Oppenheimer to the James Madison coaching staff as an assistant coach.

On November 17, 2020, the Milwaukee Bucks announced that Oppenheimer has returned to the team as an assistant coach. Oppenheimer became an NBA champion when the Bucks defeated the Phoenix Suns in 6 games of the 2021 NBA Finals.

== Personal life ==
Oppenheimer and his wife Adrienne, a former college volleyball player from Puerto Rico, have two daughters, Gabriella "Gabbi", who works in finance, and Nicolette "Nikki", who played basketball for James Madison University, having previously played for Syracuse University and Montini Catholic High School. Nicolette represented the Puerto Rico women's national under-18 team at the 2016 FIBA Americas Under-18 Championship for Women.

== See also ==
- List of foreign NBA coaches
