= Guatemala women's national under-17 and under-18 basketball team =

Guatemala
- FIBA zone: FIBA Americas
- National federation: Federación de Baloncesto de Guatemala

U19 World Cup
- Appearances: None

U18 AmeriCup
- Appearances: 3
- Medals: None

U17 Centrobasket
- Appearances: 6
- Medals: (bronze) Bronze: 1 (2015)

The Guatemala women's national under-17 and under-18 basketball team is a national basketball team of Guatemala, administered by the Federación de Baloncesto de Guatemala. It represents the country in international under-17 and under-18 women's basketball competitions.

== FIBA U17 Women's Centrobasket participations ==
Year	Result
2009	5th
2011	5th
2015	3rd place, bronze medalist(s)
2017	5th
2019	4th
2023	7th

== FIBA Under-18 Women's AmeriCup participations ==
Year	Result
1988	8th
2004	6th
2016	8th

== See also ==
- Guatemala men's national basketball team
- Guatemala women's national basketball team
- Guatemala women's national under-15 and under-16 basketball team
