= Costa Rica women's national under-17 and under-18 basketball team =

Costa Rica
- FIBA zone: FIBA Americas
- National federation: Federación Costarricense de Baloncesto Aficionado

U19 World Cup
- Appearances: None

U18 AmeriCup
- Appearances: 3
- Medals: None

U17 Centrobasket
- Appearances: 6
- Medals: (bronze) Bronze: 2 (2005, 2009)

The Costa Rica women's national under-17 and under-18 basketball team is a national basketball team of Costa Rica, administered by the Federación Costarricense de Baloncesto Aficionado. It represents the country in international under-17 and under-18 women's basketball competitions.

== FIBA U17 Women's Centrobasket participations ==
Year	Result
2005	3rd place, bronze medalist(s)
2009	3rd place, bronze medalist(s)
2013	5th
2017	4th
2019	5th
2023	8th

== FIBA Under-18 Women's AmeriCup participations ==
Year	Result
1996	7th
2006	7th
2010	8th

== See also ==
- Costa Rica women's national basketball team
- Costa Rica women's national under-15 and under-16 basketball team
- Costa Rica men's national under-17 and under-18 basketball team
