= 2023 FIBA U17 Women's Centrobasket =

International youth basketball tournament

Tournament details
- Host country: Nicaragua
- City: Managua
- Dates: 5–9 August 2023
- Teams: 8 (from 1 confederation)
- Venue(s): 1 (in 1 host city)

Final positions
- Champions: Puerto Rico (3rd title)
- Runners-up: Mexico
- Third place: Dominican Republic

Official website
- www.fiba.basketball/history

The 2023 FIBA U17 Women's Centrobasket was the eighth edition of the Central American and Caribbean basketball championship for women's under-17 national teams. The tournament was played at Polideportivo Alexis Argüello in Managua, Nicaragua, from 5 to 9 August 2023.

== Participating teams ==
- Costa Rica
- Dominican Republic
- El Salvador
- Guatemala
- Mexico
- Nicaragua
- Panama
- Puerto Rico

== Group phase ==
In this round, the teams were drawn into two groups of four. The top two teams from each group advanced to the semifinals; the other teams advanced to the 5th–8th place playoffs.

All times are local (Central Standard Time – UTC-6).

=== Group A ===
Pos	Team	Pld	W	L	PF	PA	PD	Pts	Qualification
1	Mexico	3	3	0	199	124	+75	6	Semifinals
2	Dominican Republic	3	2	1	177	158	+19	5	Semifinals
3	Nicaragua (H)	3	1	2	155	194	−39	4	5th–8th place playoffs
4	El Salvador	3	0	3	134	189	−55	3	5th–8th place playoffs

Source: FIBA
(H) Hosts

5 August 2023
18:30

Boxscore

El Salvador	58–62 (OT)	Nicaragua
Scoring by quarter: 13–12, 12–16, 13–16, 16–10, Overtime: 4–8

Polideportivo Alexis Argüello, Managua

5 August 2023
20:30

Boxscore

Dominican Republic	51–62	Mexico
Scoring by quarter: 6–20, 20–17, 10–15, 15–10

Polideportivo Alexis Argüello, Managua

6 August 2023
18:30

Boxscore

Nicaragua	53–69	Dominican Republic
Scoring by quarter: 11–14, 14–17, 16–21, 12–17

Polideportivo Alexis Argüello, Managua

6 August 2023
20:30

Boxscore

Mexico	70–33	El Salvador
Scoring by quarter: 16–10, 16–6, 16–9, 22–8

Polideportivo Alexis Argüello, Managua

7 August 2023
18:30

Boxscore

Nicaragua	40–67	Mexico
Scoring by quarter: 6–22, 13–16, 7–21, 14–8

Polideportivo Alexis Argüello, Managua

7 August 2023
20:30

Boxscore

Dominican Republic	57–43	El Salvador
Scoring by quarter: 19–11, 12–8, 14–18, 12–6

Polideportivo Alexis Argüello, Managua

=== Group B ===
Pos	Team	Pld	W	L	PF	PA	PD	Pts	Qualification
1	Puerto Rico	3	3	0	244	126	+118	6	Semifinals
2	Panama	3	2	1	189	166	+23	5	Semifinals
3	Costa Rica	3	1	2	148	169	−21	4	5th–8th place playoffs
4	Guatemala	3	0	3	104	224	−120	3	5th–8th place playoffs

Source: FIBA

5 August 2023
14:00

Boxscore

Guatemala	39–76	Panama
Scoring by quarter: 3–14, 14–19, 9–30, 13–13

Polideportivo Alexis Argüello, Managua

5 August 2023
16:00

Boxscore

Costa Rica	41–76	Puerto Rico
Scoring by quarter: 16–11, 11–32, 6–12, 8–21

Polideportivo Alexis Argüello, Managua

6 August 2023
14:00

Boxscore

Puerto Rico	94–27	Guatemala
Scoring by quarter: 20–9, 34–4, 19–9, 21–5

Polideportivo Alexis Argüello, Managua

6 August 2023
16:00

Boxscore

Panama	55–53	Costa Rica
Scoring by quarter: 8–7, 14–16, 18–18, 15–12

Polideportivo Alexis Argüello, Managua

7 August 2023
14:00

Boxscore

Costa Rica	54–38	Guatemala
Scoring by quarter: 16–10, 5–10, 14–7, 19–11

Polideportivo Alexis Argüello, Managua

7 August 2023
16:00

Boxscore

Panama	58–74	Puerto Rico
Scoring by quarter: 13–29, 13–14, 18–18, 14–13

Polideportivo Alexis Argüello, Managua

== 5th–8th place playoffs ==
5th–8th place semifinals
A3	Nicaragua	62
B4	Guatemala	53
B3	Costa Rica	51
A4	El Salvador	53

5th place match
A3	Nicaragua	49
A4	El Salvador	33
7th place match
B4	Guatemala	55
B3	Costa Rica	50

=== 5th–8th place semifinals ===
8 August 2023
14:00

Boxscore

Nicaragua	62–53	Guatemala
Scoring by quarter: 14–14, 12–19, 21–7, 15–13

Polideportivo Alexis Argüello, Managua

8 August 2023
16:00

Boxscore

Costa Rica	51–53	El Salvador
Scoring by quarter: 12–15, 6–14, 12–11, 21–13

Polideportivo Alexis Argüello, Managua

=== 7th place match ===
9 August 2023
14:00

Boxscore

Guatemala	55–50	Costa Rica
Scoring by quarter: 11–13, 11–11, 13–12, 20–14

Polideportivo Alexis Argüello, Managua

=== 5th place match ===
9 August 2023
16:00

Boxscore

Nicaragua	49–33	El Salvador
Scoring by quarter: 10–11, 13–8, 15–3, 11–11

Polideportivo Alexis Argüello, Managua

== Championship playoffs ==
Semifinals
A1	Mexico	67
B2	Panama	51
B1	Puerto Rico	58
A2	Dominican Republic	53

Final
A1	Mexico	55
B1	Puerto Rico	71
3rd place match
B2	Panama	74
A2	Dominican Republic	80

=== Semifinals ===
8 August 2023
18:30

Boxscore

Mexico	67–51	Panama
Scoring by quarter: 7–19, 28–4, 15–14, 17–14

Polideportivo Alexis Argüello, Managua

8 August 2023
20:30

Boxscore

Puerto Rico	58–53	Dominican Republic
Scoring by quarter: 13–14, 12–11, 14–15, 19–13

Polideportivo Alexis Argüello, Managua

=== 3rd place match ===
9 August 2023
18:30

Boxscore

Panama	74–80	Dominican Republic
Scoring by quarter: 15–20, 19–13, 20–19, 20–28

Polideportivo Alexis Argüello, Managua

=== Final ===
9 August 2023
20:30

Boxscore

Mexico	55–71	Puerto Rico
Scoring by quarter: 15–17, 9–13, 13–21, 18–20

Polideportivo Alexis Argüello, Managua

== Final standings ==
Rank	Team
1st place, gold medalist(s)	Puerto Rico
2nd place, silver medalist(s)	Mexico
3rd place, bronze medalist(s)	Dominican Republic
4	Panama
5	Nicaragua
6	El Salvador
7	Guatemala
8	Costa Rica

Qualified for the 2024 FIBA U18 Women's AmeriCup
