= El Salvador women's national under-17 and under-18 basketball team =

El Salvador
- FIBA zone: FIBA Americas
- National federation: Federación Salvadoreña de Baloncesto

U19 World Cup
- Appearances: None

U18 AmeriCup
- Appearances: 3
- Medals: None

U17 Centrobasket
- Appearances: 5
- Medals: (silver) Silver: 1 (2013); (bronze) Bronze: 1 (2017)

The El Salvador women's national under-17 and under-18 basketball team is a national basketball team of El Salvador, administered by the Federación Salvadoreña de Baloncesto. It represents the country in international under-17 and under-18 women's basketball competitions.

== FIBA U17 Women's Centrobasket participations ==
Year	Result
2013	2nd place, silver medalist(s)
2015	5th
2017	3rd place, bronze medalist(s)
2019	7th
2023	6th

== FIBA Under-18 Women's AmeriCup participations ==
Year	Result
2014	8th
2018	8th
2022	8th

== See also ==
- El Salvador women's national basketball team
- El Salvador women's national under-15 and under-16 basketball team
