= 2019 FIBA U17 Women's Centrobasket =

International youth basketball tournament

Tournament details
- Host country: Puerto Rico
- City: San Juan
- Dates: 7–11 July 2019
- Teams: 8 (from 1 confederation)
- Venue(s): 1 (in 1 host city)

Final positions
- Champions: Mexico (5th title)
- Runners-up: Puerto Rico
- Third place: Dominican Republic

Official website
- www.fiba.basketball/history

The 2019 FIBA U17 Women's Centrobasket was the seventh edition of the Central American and Caribbean basketball championship for women's under-17 national teams. The tournament was played at Roberto Clemente Coliseum in San Juan, Puerto Rico, from 7 to 11 July 2019.

== Participating teams ==
- Bahamas
- Barbados
- Costa Rica
- Dominican Republic
- El Salvador
- Guatemala
- Mexico
- Puerto Rico

== Group phase ==
In this round, the teams were drawn into two groups of four. The top two teams from each group advanced to the semifinals; the other teams advanced to the 5th–8th place playoffs.

All times are local (Atlantic Standard Time – UTC-4).

=== Group A ===
Pos	Team	Pld	W	L	PF	PA	PD	Pts	Qualification
1	Mexico	3	3	0	242	126	+116	6	Semifinals
2	Dominican Republic	3	2	1	201	142	+59	5	Semifinals
3	Costa Rica	3	1	2	192	170	+22	4	5th–8th place playoffs
4	Barbados	3	0	3	89	286	−197	3	5th–8th place playoffs

Source: FIBA

7 July 2019
13:00

Boxscore

Mexico	99–18	Barbados
Scoring by quarter: 18–5, 24–4, 27–7, 30–2

Roberto Clemente Coliseum, San Juan

7 July 2019
17:45

Boxscore

Dominican Republic	62–36	Costa Rica
Scoring by quarter: 24–13, 14–8, 10–8, 14–7

Roberto Clemente Coliseum, San Juan

8 July 2019
13:00

Boxscore

Costa Rica	51–70	Mexico
Scoring by quarter: 16–25, 14–15, 11–18, 10–12

Roberto Clemente Coliseum, San Juan

8 July 2019
17:45

Boxscore

Barbados	33–82	Dominican Republic
Scoring by quarter: 10–18, 6–15, 2–31, 15–18

Roberto Clemente Coliseum, San Juan

9 July 2019
13:00

Boxscore

Barbados	38–105	Costa Rica
Scoring by quarter: 10–27, 5–30, 11–30, 12–18

Roberto Clemente Coliseum, San Juan

9 July 2019
17:45

Boxscore

Dominican Republic	57–73	Mexico
Scoring by quarter: 11–14, 14–22, 15–14, 17–23

Roberto Clemente Coliseum, San Juan

=== Group B ===
Pos	Team	Pld	W	L	PF	PA	PD	Pts	Qualification
1	Puerto Rico (H)	3	3	0	216	112	+104	6	Semifinals
2	Guatemala	3	2	1	162	171	−9	5	Semifinals
3	Bahamas	3	1	2	186	207	−21	4	5th–8th place playoffs
4	El Salvador	3	0	3	132	206	−74	3	5th–8th place playoffs

Source: FIBA
(H) Hosts

7 July 2019
15:15

Boxscore

Bahamas	79–59	El Salvador
Scoring by quarter: 17–19, 23–9, 20–22, 19–9

Roberto Clemente Coliseum, San Juan

7 July 2019
20:00

Boxscore

Guatemala	32–71	Puerto Rico
Scoring by quarter: 11–18, 10–17, 7–16, 4–20

Roberto Clemente Coliseum, San Juan

8 July 2019
15:15

Boxscore

Guatemala	65–36	El Salvador
Scoring by quarter: 16–11, 23–12, 15–11, 11–2

Roberto Clemente Coliseum, San Juan

8 July 2019
20:00

Boxscore

Puerto Rico	83–43	Bahamas
Scoring by quarter: 17–7, 23–12, 22–8, 21–16

Roberto Clemente Coliseum, San Juan

9 July 2019
15:15

Boxscore

Bahamas	64–65	Guatemala
Scoring by quarter: 15–12, 12–14, 12–18, 25–21

Roberto Clemente Coliseum, San Juan

9 July 2019
20:00

Boxscore

El Salvador	37–62	Puerto Rico
Scoring by quarter: 5–24, 11–14, 9–15, 12–9

Roberto Clemente Coliseum, San Juan

== 5th–8th place playoffs ==
5th–8th place semifinals
A3	Costa Rica	53
B4	El Salvador	37
B3	Bahamas	83
A4	Barbados	41

5th place match
A3	Costa Rica	73
B3	Bahamas	50
7th place match
B4	El Salvador	79
A4	Barbados	30

=== 5th–8th place semifinals ===
10 July 2019
15:15

Boxscore

Costa Rica	53–37	El Salvador
Scoring by quarter: 8–9, 13–9, 18–14, 14–5

Roberto Clemente Coliseum, San Juan

10 July 2019
13:00

Boxscore

Bahamas	83–41	Barbados
Scoring by quarter: 20–7, 14–4, 27–8, 22–22

Roberto Clemente Coliseum, San Juan

=== 7th place match ===
11 July 2019
13:00

Boxscore

El Salvador	79–30	Barbados
Scoring by quarter: 16–7, 28–7, 18–5, 17–11

Roberto Clemente Coliseum, San Juan

=== 5th place match ===
11 July 2019
15:15

Boxscore

Costa Rica	73–50	Bahamas
Scoring by quarter: 24–9, 18–13, 20–13, 11–15

Roberto Clemente Coliseum, San Juan

== Championship playoffs ==
Semifinals
A1	Mexico	53
B2	Guatemala	44
B1	Puerto Rico	60
A2	Dominican Republic	59

Final
A1	Mexico	61
B1	Puerto Rico	56
3rd place match
B2	Guatemala	40
A2	Dominican Republic	55

=== Semifinals ===
10 July 2019
17:45

Boxscore

Mexico	53–44	Guatemala
Scoring by quarter: 15–6, 13–19, 12–12, 13–7

Roberto Clemente Coliseum, San Juan

10 July 2019
20:00

Boxscore

Puerto Rico	60–59	Dominican Republic
Scoring by quarter: 11–17, 13–13, 18–12, 18–17

Roberto Clemente Coliseum, San Juan

=== 3rd place match ===
11 July 2019
17:45

Boxscore

Guatemala	40–55	Dominican Republic
Scoring by quarter: 14–14, 8–10, 3–21, 15–10

Roberto Clemente Coliseum, San Juan

=== Final ===
11 July 2019
20:00

Boxscore

Mexico	61–56	Puerto Rico
Scoring by quarter: 11–14, 17–13, 20–17, 13–12

Roberto Clemente Coliseum, San Juan

== Final standings ==
Rank	Team
1st place, gold medalist(s)	Mexico
2nd place, silver medalist(s)	Puerto Rico
3rd place, bronze medalist(s)	Dominican Republic
4	Guatemala
5	Costa Rica
6	Bahamas
7	El Salvador
8	Barbados
