= Bahamas women's national under-17 basketball team =

Bahamas
- FIBA zone: FIBA Americas
- National federation: Bahamas Basketball Federation

U19 World Cup
- Appearances: None

U18 AmeriCup
- Appearances: None

U17 Centrobasket
- Appearances: 6
- Medals: None

The Bahamas women's national under-17 basketball team is a national basketball team of The Bahamas, administered by the Bahamas Basketball Federation. It represents the country in international under-17 women's basketball competitions. The team also participated at the CBC U18 Women's Championship in 2008, where they won the gold medal.

== FIBA U17 Women's Centrobasket participations ==
Year	Result
2005	5th
2009	6th
2011	4th
2013	8th
2017	6th
2019	6th

== See also ==
- Bahamas women's national basketball team
- Bahamas women's national under-15 basketball team
- Bahamas men's national under-18 basketball team
