= FIBA U17 Women's Centrobasket =

International youth basketball tournament

- Most recent season or competition: 2023 FIBA U17 Women's Centrobasket
- Sport: Basketball
- Founded: 2005
- Organizing body: FIBA Americas
- No. of teams: 8 max
- Continent: Central America and the Caribbean
- Most recent champion: Puerto Rico (3rd title)
- Most titles: Mexico (5 titles)
- Qualification: FIBA Under-18 Women's AmeriCup
- Related competitions: FIBA U15 Women's Centrobasket
- Website: www.fiba.basketball/history

The FIBA U17 Women's Centrobasket is an under-17 women's basketball tournament held about every two years among 31 countries of Central America and the Caribbean and is organized in part by FIBA Americas. The tournament serves as a gateway to the FIBA Under-18 Women's AmeriCup. Originally, this competition was played in the under-18 age category, and since 2009 it has been played in the under-17 age category.

== Summary ==
Year	Host	Gold	Silver	Bronze
2005	Dominican Republic (Hato Mayor del Rey)	Puerto Rico	Dominican Republic	Costa Rica
2009	Mexico (Aguascalientes)	Mexico	Puerto Rico	Costa Rica
2011	Puerto Rico (Gurabo)	Puerto Rico	Mexico	Dominican Republic
2013	El Salvador (San Salvador)	Mexico	El Salvador	Puerto Rico
2015	Mexico (Mexico City)	Mexico	Puerto Rico	Guatemala
2017	Puerto Rico (Aguada)	Mexico	Puerto Rico	El Salvador
2019	Puerto Rico (San Juan)	Mexico	Puerto Rico	Dominican Republic
2023	Nicaragua (Managua)	Puerto Rico	Mexico	Dominican Republic

== Medal table ==
Rank	Nation	Gold	Silver	Bronze	Total
1	Mexico	5	2	0	7
2	Puerto Rico	3	4	1	8
3	Dominican Republic	0	1	3	4
4	El Salvador	0	1	1	2
5	Costa Rica	0	0	2	2
6	Guatemala	0	0	1	1
Totals (6 entries)		8	8	8	24

== Participation details ==
Team	(Dominican Republic); 2005	(Mexico); 2009	(Puerto Rico); 2011	(El Salvador); 2013	(Mexico); 2015	(Puerto Rico); 2017	(Puerto Rico); 2019	(Nicaragua); 2023
Bahamas	5th	6th	4th	8th	—	6th	6th	—
Barbados	—	—	—	—	—	—	8th	—
British Virgin Islands	—	—	—	—	—	8th	—	—
Cayman Islands	—	—	7th	—	—	—	—	—
Costa Rica	3rd	3rd	—	5th	—	4th	5th	8th
Dominican Republic	2nd	—	3rd	4th	—	—	3rd	3rd
El Salvador	—	—	—	2nd	5th	3rd	7th	6th
Guatemala	—	5th	5th	—	3rd	5th	4th	7th
Honduras	—	—	—	6th	4th	—	—	—
Mexico	—	1st	2nd	1st	1st	1st	1st	2nd
Nicaragua	—	—	—	—	—	—	—	5th
Panama	—	—	—	—	—	—	—	4th
Puerto Rico	1st	2nd	1st	3rd	2nd	2nd	2nd	1st
Suriname	—	—	—	—	—	7th	—	—
Virgin Islands	4th	4th	6th	7th	—	—	—	—
