= 2014 FIBA Americas Under-18 Championship for Women =

2014 FIBA U18 Women's AmeriCup
10th FIBA Under-18 Women's Americas Basketball Championship

Tournament details
- Host country: United States
- Dates: 6–10 August 2014
- Teams: 8
- Venue: 1 (in 1 host city)

Final positions
- Champions: United States (8th title)

Tournament statistics
- MVP: (United States) A'ja Wilson
- Top scorer: (United States) Wilson (19.0)
- Top rebounds: (Argentina) Llorente (11.0)
- Top assists: (Brazil) De Paula, (Canada) Provo (4.8)
- PPG (Team): (United States) (106.0)
- RPG (Team): (United States) (52.0)
- APG (Team): (United States) (25.4)

Official website
- 2014 FIBA Americas U-18 Championship for Women

The 2014 FIBA Americas Under-18 Championship for Women was an international basketball competition that took place in Colorado Springs, Colorado, United States from August 6–10, 2014. It was the tenth edition of the championship, and was the FIBA Americas qualifying tournament for the 2015 FIBA Under-19 World Championship for Women. Eight national teams from across the Americas, composed of women aged 19 and under, competed in the tournament. The United States won their seventh consecutive gold in this event by beating Canada in the final, 104–74.

== Venues ==
- United States Olympic Training Center, Colorado Springs

== Standings ==
=== Group A ===
Pos	Team	Pld	W	L	PF	PA	PD	Pts	Qualification
1	United States	3	3	0	329	181	+148	6	Advance to Semifinals
2	Canada	3	2	1	222	195	+27	5	Advance to Semifinals
3	Mexico	3	1	2	183	222	−39	4	Classification 5-8
4	El Salvador	3	0	3	121	257	−136	3	Classification 5-8

Source: Standings

6 June 2014
18:15

Boxscore

El Salvador	34–65	Canada
Scoring by quarter: 13-18, 4-20, 8-10, 9-17
Pts: Martinez 10; Rebs: Martinez 8 Asts: Rivas 2		Pts: Provo 14; Rebs: Fradgley 9 Asts: Colley 4

US Olympic Training Center, Colorado Springs

6 June 2014
21:00

Boxscore

Mexico	55–104	United States
Scoring by quarter: 10-26, 14-21, 16-32, 15-25
Pts: Ramos 15; Rebs: Ramos 4 Asts: M.Perez 2		Pts: Turner, Shepard 16; Rebs: Wilson 10; Asts: Mabrey 6

US Olympic Training Center, Colorado Springs

7 June 2014
18:30

Boxscore

Mexico	54–81	Canada
Scoring by quarter: 9-19, 14-15, 16-23, 15-24
Pts: L.Perez 10; Rebs: Ramos 8 Asts: Treviño 3		Pts: Buttenham, Provo 15; Rebs: Buttenham, Creighton 7 Asts: Carleton 3

US Olympic Training Center, Colorado Springs

7 June 2014
20:30

Boxscore

United States	118–50	El Salvador
Scoring by quarter: 33-11, 34-11, 38-7, 13-21
Pts: Walker 18; Rebs: Collier 12; Asts: Moore 6		Pts: Martinez 17; Rebs: Martinez 10; Asts: Martinez, Hernandez 2

US Olympic Training Center, Colorado Springs

8 June 2014
18:30

Boxscore

El Salvador	37–74	Mexico
Scoring by quarter: 10-18, 5-16, 11-23, 11-17
Pts: Martinez 12; Rebs: Rivas 10; Asts: Martinez 3		Pts: Soto 15; Rebs: Ramos 9 Asts: Ramos 3

US Olympic Training Center, Colorado Springs

8 June 2014
20:30

Boxscore

Canada	76–107	United States
Scoring by quarter: 23-21, 18-33, 18-29, 17-24
Pts: Colley 21; Rebs: Colley 4 Asts: Colley 4		Pts: Collier 22; Rebs: Collier 10; Asts: Kea, Caldwell 4

US Olympic Training Center, Colorado Springs

=== Group B ===
Pos	Team	Pld	W	L	PF	PA	PD	Pts	Qualification
1	Brazil	3	2	1	225	138	+87	5	Advance to Semifinals
2	Argentina	3	2	1	216	154	+62	5	Advance to Semifinals
3	Chile	3	1	2	156	233	−77	4	Classification 5-8
4	Puerto Rico	3	1	2	166	238	−72	4	Classification 5-8

Source: Standings

6 June 2014
14:00

Boxscore

Chile	40–45	Argentina
Scoring by quarter: 7-12, 10-12, 13-11, 10-10
Pts: Abuyeres 12; Rebs: Abuyeres 10; Asts: Basaez 4		Pts: Albuerne 12; Rebs: Llorente 11; Asts: Llorente, Giustiniani 3

US Olympic Training Center, Colorado Springs

6 June 2014
16:00

Boxscore

Brazil	57–64	Puerto Rico
Scoring by quarter: 15-13, 11-20, 11-17, 20-14
Pts: Guimaraes 15; Rebs: 4 players 6 Asts: De Carvalho, C.Dos Reis 2		Pts: Leon 15; Rebs: Crespo, Robinson 6 Asts: 4 players 1

US Olympic Training Center, Colorado Springs

7 June 2014
14:00

Boxscore

Argentina	56–61	Brazil
Scoring by quarter: 20-21, 7-8, 21-13, 8-19
Pts: Garcia, Leiva 11; Rebs: Llorente 14; Asts: Armesto 4		Pts: Domingos 15; Rebs: Guimaraes 14; Asts: T.Dos Reis 4

US Olympic Training Center, Colorado Springs

7 June 2014
16:00

Boxscore

Puerto Rico	51–63	Chile
Scoring by quarter: 11-20, 14-16, 12-16, 14-11
Pts: Gerena, De Jesus 9 Rebs: Crespo 10; Asts: Roma, Gerena 2		Pts: Cousiño 19; Rebs: Abuyeres 13; Asts: Basaez 3

US Olympic Training Center, Colorado Springs

8 June 2014
14:00

Boxscore

Chile	63–75	Brazil
Scoring by quarter: 15-15, 11-20, 16-20, 21-20
Pts: Basaez 17; Rebs: Fuentes 7 Asts: Basaez 5		Pts: Cortes 14; Rebs: Guimaraes 7 Asts: 3 players 3

US Olympic Training Center, Colorado Springs

8 June 2014
16:00

Boxscore

Puerto Rico	44–47	Argentina
Scoring by quarter: 10-10, 11-7, 6-16, 17-14
Pts: Leon 21; Rebs: Crespo 9 Asts: Vargas 2		Pts: Llorente 21; Rebs: Llorente 13; Asts: Armesto 3

US Olympic Training Center, Colorado Springs

== Final round ==
=== Classification 5–8 ===
9 June 2014
14:00

Boxscore

Mexico	51–68	Puerto Rico
Scoring by quarter: 16-15, 8-13, 9-21, 18-19
Pts: Lopez 18; Rebs: Lopez 11; Asts: M.Diaz 6		Pts: Leon 23; Rebs: Roma 12; Asts: Leon 6

US Olympic Training Center, Colorado Springs

9 June 2014
16:00

Boxscore

Chile	63–41	El Salvador
Scoring by quarter: 29-14, 7-8, 10-7, 17-12
Pts: Abuyeres 14; Rebs: Abuyeres 10; Asts: Basaez 5		Pts: Martinez 11; Rebs: Martinez 12; Asts: Martinez 8

US Olympic Training Center, Colorado Springs

=== Semifinals ===
9 June 2014
18:30

Boxscore

Brazil	60–67	Canada
Scoring by quarter: 13-23, 16-12, 19-13, 12-19
Pts: Domingos 16; Rebs: Guimaraes 13; Asts: Ribeiro 2		Pts: Provo 18; Rebs: Colley 9 Asts: Buttenham 5

US Olympic Training Center, Colorado Springs

9 June 2014
20:30

Boxscore

United States	97–51	Argentina
Scoring by quarter: 30-8, 26-8, 20-23, 21-12
Pts: Wilson 23; Rebs: Wilson 9 Asts: Collier 9		Pts: Garcia 12; Rebs: 3 players 4 Asts: Giustiniani 7

US Olympic Training Center, Colorado Springs

== Final classification games ==
=== Seventh place game ===
10 June 2014
14:00

Boxscore

Mexico	77–45	El Salvador
Scoring by quarter: 19-6, 19-18, 19-12, 20-9
Pts: Soto 15; Rebs: L.Perez 7 Asts: Mejia 4		Pts: Rivas 17; Rebs: Martinez 12; Asts: Martinez 4

US Olympic Training Center, Colorado Springs

=== Fifth place game ===
10 June 2014
16:00

Boxscore

Puerto Rico	51–49	Chile
Scoring by quarter: 13-11, 11-15, 10-10, 17-13
Pts: Leon 14; Rebs: Leon 10; Asts: 3 players 2		Pts: Cousiño 17; Rebs: Abuyeres 13; Asts: Basaez 5

US Olympic Training Center, Colorado Springs

=== Bronze medal game ===
10 June 2014
18:30

Boxscore

Argentina	69–67	Brazil
Scoring by quarter: 13-15, 10-15, 25-18, 21-19
Pts: Llorente 23; Rebs: Llorente 15; Asts: Armesto 7		Pts: Cortes 13; Rebs: Domingos 9 Asts: De Carvalho 4

US Olympic Training Center, Colorado Springs

=== Final ===
10 June 2014
20:30

Boxscore

United States	104–74	Canada
Scoring by quarter: 26-12, 24-20, 29-15, 25-27
Pts: Wilson 25; Rebs: Wilson 11; Asts: Moore 7		Pts: Colley 16; Rebs: 3 players 3 Asts: Provo 5

US Olympic Training Center, Colorado Springs

== Awards ==
2014 FIBA Americas Under-18
Championship for Women winners

United States
8th title

Most Valuable Player
(United States) A'ja Wilson

== Final ranking ==
Qualified for the 2015 FIBA Under-19 World Championship for Women.

Rank	Team	Record
1st place, gold medalist(s)	United States	5–0
2nd place, silver medalist(s)	Canada	3–2
3rd place, bronze medalist(s)	Argentina	3–2
4	Brazil	2–3
5	Puerto Rico	3–2
6	Chile	2–3
7	Mexico	2–3
8	El Salvador	0–5
