= Dominican Republic women's national under-17 and under-18 basketball team =

Dominican Republic
- FIBA zone: FIBA Americas
- National federation: Federación Dominicana de Baloncesto

U19 World Cup
- Appearances: None

U18 AmeriCup
- Appearances: 4
- Medals: None

U17 Centrobasket
- Appearances: 5
- Medals: (silver) Silver: 1 (2005); (bronze) Bronze: 3 (2011, 2019, 2023)

The Dominican Republic women's national under-17 and under-18 basketball team is a national basketball team of the Dominican Republic, administered by the Federación Dominicana de Baloncesto. It represents the country in international under-17 and under-18 women's basketball competitions.

== FIBA U17 Women's Centrobasket participations ==
Year	Result
2005	2nd place, silver medalist(s)
2011	3rd place, bronze medalist(s)
2013	4th
2019	3rd place, bronze medalist(s)
2023	3rd place, bronze medalist(s)

== FIBA Under-18 Women's AmeriCup participations ==
Year	Result
2004	7th
2012	8th
2024	8th
2026	8th

== See also ==
- Dominican Republic women's national basketball team
- Dominican Republic women's national under-15 and under-16 basketball team
- Dominican Republic men's national under-19 basketball team
