= 2024 FIBA U18 Women's AmeriCup =

14th FIBA Under-18 Women's Americas Basketball Championship

Tournament details
- Host country: Colombia
- City: Bucaramanga
- Dates: 17–23 June
- Teams: 8 (from 1 confederation)
- Venue: 1 (in 1 host city)

Final positions
- Champions: United States (12th title)
- Runners-up: Canada
- Third place: Argentina

Tournament statistics
- MVP: (United States) Joyce Edwards
- Top scorer: (Colombia) Marta Moscarella (19.8)
- Top rebounds: (Dominican Republic) Anny De Jesus (12.3)
- Top assists: (Canada) Jasmine Bascoe (4.7)
- PPG (Team): United States (104.7)
- RPG (Team): United States (65.4)
- APG (Team): United States (26.0)

Official website
- www.fiba.basketball/history

Another logo version for 2024 FIBA U18 Women's AmeriCup

The 2024 FIBA U18 Women's AmeriCup was the 14th edition of the FIBA Under-18 Women's AmeriCup, a biennial international under-18 women's basketball competition. The tournament was held from 17 to 23 June 2024 in Bucaramanga, Colombia. It also served as the FIBA Americas' qualifiers for the 2025 FIBA Under-19 Women's Basketball World Cup in the Czech Republic, where the top four team qualified.

== Hosts selection ==
On 9 April 2024, FIBA Americas decided to grant Colombia the hosting rights for the FIBA U18 Women's AmeriCup. The city of Bucaramanga will host the event which will take place from 17 to 23 June.

== Participating teams ==
- North America:
1. United States
2. Canada
- Central America/Caribbean: (2023 FIBA U17 Women's Centrobasket in Managua, Nicaragua, 5–9 August 2023)
1. Puerto Rico
2. Mexico
3. Dominican Republic
- South America: (2023 FIBA U17 Women's South American Championship in Bucaramanga, Colombia, 26 November – 2 December 2023)
1. Brazil
2. Colombia (Hosts)
3. Argentina

== Preliminary round ==
The draw was held on 1 May 2024 in FIBA Americas Regional Office in Miami, Florida, United States.

All times are local (UTC-5).

=== Group A ===
Pos	Team	Pld	W	L	PF	PA	PD	Pts	Qualification
1	Canada	3	3	0	287	120	+167	6	Advance to Quarterfinals
2	Argentina	3	2	1	195	174	+21	5	Advance to Quarterfinals
3	Colombia (H)	3	1	2	177	209	−32	4	Advance to Quarterfinals
4	Dominican Republic	3	0	3	126	282	−156	3	Advance to Quarterfinals

Source: FIBA
Rules for classification: 1) Points; 2) Head-to-head results; 3) Points difference; 4) Points scored.
(H) Hosts

17 June 2024
17:40

Boxscore

Argentina	55–84	Canada
Scoring by quarter: 13–25, 9–22, 19–20, 14–17
Pts: Alma Bourgarel 16; Rebs: Milagros Morell 7 Asts: Juana Barrionuevo 3		Pts: Jasmine Bascoe 19; Rebs: Divine Tumba 10; Asts: Jasmine Bascoe 6

Coliseo Bicentenario, Bucaramanga
Referees: Orlando Jose Varela Diaz (HND), Larissa Sales Rodrigues (BRA), Julirys Guzman Laureano (PUR)

17 June 2024
20:40

Boxscore

Colombia	84–64	Dominican Republic
Scoring by quarter: 21–16, 20–11, 27–20, 16–17
Pts: Marta Moscarella 25; Rebs: Meredith Venner 11; Asts: Maria Perez 7		Pts: Arianna Mercado 24; Rebs: Anny De Jesus 11; Asts: three players 2

Coliseo Bicentenario, Bucaramanga
Attendance: 350
Referees: Jesus Lopez Diaz (MEX), Nicolas Zivieri (BRA), Francisco Javier De Leon Ortega (PUR)

18 June 2024
17:40

Boxscore

Dominican Republic	35–81	Argentina
Scoring by quarter: 5–25, 6–20, 7–34, 17–2
Pts: two players 8 Rebs: Anny De Jesus 13; Asts: Arianna Mercado 3		Pts: two players 13; Rebs: Nerea Lagowski 9 Asts: Alma Bourgarel 4

Coliseo Bicentenario, Bucaramanga
Attendance: 100
Referees: Aline García (URU), Nicolas Zivieri (BRA), Julirys Guzman Laureano (PUR)

18 June 2024
20:10

Boxscore

Canada	86–38	Colombia
Scoring by quarter: 17–4, 27–8, 24–16, 18–10
Pts: Divine Tumba 15; Rebs: Divine Tumba 12; Asts: two players 2		Pts: Marta Moscarella 11; Rebs: Marta Moscarella 7 Asts: Valerin Lopez 2

Coliseo Bicentenario, Bucaramanga
Attendance: 400
Referees: Francisco Javier De Leon Ortega (PUR), Jesus Lopez Diaz (MEX), Larissa Sales Rodrigues (BRA)

19 June 2024
17:40

Boxscore

Canada	117–27	Dominican Republic
Scoring by quarter: 24–8, 36–4, 24–7, 33–8
Pts: Kamora Morgan 17; Rebs: three players 6 Asts: Jasmine Bascoe 7		Pts: Anny De Jesus 6 Rebs: Anny De Jesus 10; Asts: six players 1

Coliseo Bicentenario, Bucaramanga
Attendance: 100
Referees: Francisco Javier De Leon Ortega (PUR), Jesus Lopez Diaz (MEX), Nicolas Zivieri (BRA)

19 June 2024
20:10

Boxscore

Colombia	55–59	Argentina
Scoring by quarter: 18–18, 17–4, 13–20, 7–17
Pts: Marta Moscarella 24; Rebs: Meredith Venner 19; Asts: Maria Acosta 4		Pts: Malena Maggi 18; Rebs: Nerea Lagowski 13; Asts: Alma Bourgarel 4

Coliseo Bicentenario, Bucaramanga
Attendance: 350
Referees: Aline García (URU), Julirys Guzman Laureano (PUR), Larissa Sales Rodrigues (BRA)

=== Group B ===
Pos	Team	Pld	W	L	PF	PA	PD	Pts	Qualification
1	United States	3	3	0	314	93	+221	6	Advance to Quarterfinals
2	Brazil	3	2	1	185	212	−27	5	Advance to Quarterfinals
3	Puerto Rico	3	1	2	141	225	−84	4	Advance to Quarterfinals
4	Mexico	3	0	3	149	259	−110	3	Advance to Quarterfinals

Source: FIBA
Rules for classification: 1) Points; 2) Head-to-head results; 3) Points difference; 4) Points scored.

17 June 2024
12:40

Boxscore

Mexico	64–69	Puerto Rico
Scoring by quarter: 11–21, 10–18, 21–9, 22–21
Pts: Mariana Medivil 16; Rebs: two players 9 Asts: Johanna Flores 5		Pts: Desirek Nieves 20; Rebs: Diann Jackson 10; Asts: Diann Jackson 4

Coliseo Bicentenario, Bucaramanga
Attendance: 100
Referees: Aline García (URU), Fei Xiang (CAN), Carla Cristel Peña Moreta (DOM)

17 June 2024
15:10

Boxscore

United States	97–51	Brazil
Scoring by quarter: 35–10, 23–21, 18–9, 21–11
Pts: two players 13; Rebs: Sienna Betts 13; Asts: two players 5		Pts: two players 11; Rebs: Heloisa Duppre 10; Asts: Mikaelly De Freitas 4

Coliseo Bicentenario, Bucaramanga
Attendance: 175
Referees: Franco Ronconi (ARG), Carlos Pallares (COL), Mariajesús Rocio González Chaparro (CHI)

18 June 2024
12:40

Boxscore

Brazil	75–65	Mexico
Scoring by quarter: 22–19, 22–18, 17–21, 14–7
Pts: Ayla McDowell 19; Rebs: Heloisa Duppre 9 Asts: two players 2		Pts: Valeria Mora 17; Rebs: Paola Longoria 7 Asts: Valeria Cachon 3

Coliseo Bicentenario, Bucaramanga
Attendance: 111
Referees: Franco Ronconi (ARG), Fei Xiang (CAN), Mariajesús Rocio González Chaparro (CHI)

18 June 2024
15:10

Boxscore

Puerto Rico	22–102	United States
Scoring by quarter: 9–28, 11–30, 0–25, 2–19
Pts: Desirek Nieves 9 Rebs: Olivia White 6 Asts: Camila De Pool 1		Pts: Joyce Edwards 16; Rebs: Sienna Betts 11; Asts: two players 4

Coliseo Bicentenario, Bucaramanga
Referees: Orlando Jose Varela Diaz (HND), Carlos Pallares (COL), Carla Cristel Peña Moreta (DOM)

19 June 2024
12:40

Boxscore

Mexico	20–115	United States
Scoring by quarter: 6–33, 7–30, 5–30, 2–22
Pts: Ana Zesati 8 Rebs: Ana Zesati 6 Asts: Julia Rubio 2		Pts: Joyce Edwards 17; Rebs: Sarah Strong 10; Asts: Jasmine Davidson 7

Coliseo Bicentenario, Bucaramanga
Attendance: 50
Referees: Franco Ronconi (ARG), Mariajesús Rocio González Chaparro (CHI), Carla Cristel Peña Moreta (DOM)

19 June 2024
15:10

Boxscore

Brazil	59–50	Puerto Rico
Scoring by quarter: 16–16, 11–9, 18–13, 14–12
Pts: Ayla McDowell 18; Rebs: Heloisa Duppre 13; Asts: Micaela Cavalcanti 5		Pts: Adriana Robles 14; Rebs: Jasmine Nivar 7 Asts: Adriana Robles 5

Coliseo Bicentenario, Bucaramanga
Attendance: 75
Referees: Orlando Jose Varela Diaz (HND), Fei Xiang (CAN), Carlos Pallares (COL)

== Knockout stage ==
=== Bracket ===
Fifth place game
3A	Colombia	46
3B	Puerto Rico	57
Seventh place game
4B	Mexico	81
4A	Dominican Republic	55

5th–8th place semifinals
4B	Mexico	60
3A	Colombia	62
3B	Puerto Rico	72
4A	Dominican Republic	51

Quarterfinals
1A	Canada	66
4B	Mexico	58
2B	Brazil	73
3A	Colombia	55
2A	Argentina	69
3B	Puerto Rico	58
1B	United States	125
4A	Dominican Republic	27

Semifinals
1A	Canada	85
2B	Brazil	46
2A	Argentina	32
1B	United States	109

Final
1A	Canada	69
1B	United States	80
Third place game
2B	Brazil	66
2A	Argentina	73

=== Quarterfinals ===
21 June 2024
12:40

Boxscore

Canada	66–58	Mexico
Scoring by quarter: 24–17, 15–17, 14–13, 13–11
Pts: Taliyah Henderson 17; Rebs: Taliyah Henderson 9 Asts: Jasmine Bascoe 3		Pts: Mariana Medivil 14; Rebs: two players 8 Asts: Ana Zesati 5

Coliseo Bicentenario, Bucaramanga
Attendance: 50
Referees: Franco Ronconi (ARG), Francisco Javier De Leon Ortega (PUR), Carla Cristel Peña Moreta (DOM)

21 June 2024
15:10

Boxscore

United States	125–27	Dominican Republic
Scoring by quarter: 34–4, 46–6, 23–9, 22–8
Pts: two players 14; Rebs: Sarah Strong 10; Asts: Sarah Strong 5		Pts: Ana Mota 7 Rebs: Anny De Jesus 6 Asts: two players 2

Coliseo Bicentenario, Bucaramanga
Attendance: 55
Referees: Larissa Sales Rodrigues (BRA), Jesus Lopez Diaz (MEX), Carlos Pallares (COL)

21 June 2024
17:40

Boxscore

Argentina	69–58	Puerto Rico
Scoring by quarter: 12–6, 28–11, 18–18, 11–23
Pts: Alma Bougarel 16; Rebs: Nerea Lagowski 10; Asts: three players 3		Pts: Adriana Robles 15; Rebs: Diann Jackson 11; Asts: Desirek Nieves 3

Coliseo Bicentenario, Bucaramanga
Attendance: 125
Referees: Orlando Jose Varela Diaz (HND), Nicolas Zivieri (BRA), Fei Xiang (CAN)

21 June 2024
20:10

Boxscore

Brazil	73–55	Colombia
Scoring by quarter: 19–21, 24–8, 15–14, 15–12
Pts: Ayla McDowell 16; Rebs: Sther Ubaka 10; Asts: Micaela Cavalcanti 5		Pts: Marta Moscarella 19; Rebs: Marta Moscarella 11; Asts: Maria Acosta 2

Coliseo Bicentenario, Bucaramanga
Attendance: 400
Referees: Julirys Guzman Laureano (PUR), Aline García (URU), Mariajesús Rocio González Chaparro (CHI)

=== 5th–8th place semifinals ===
22 June 2024
12:40

Boxscore

Puerto Rico	72–51	Dominican Republic
Scoring by quarter: 25–12, 19–16, 12–5, 16–18
Pts: Diann Jackson 13; Rebs: Diann Jackson 12; Asts: Adriana Robles 4		Pts: Arianna Mercado 12; Rebs: Anny De Jesus 15; Asts: Portia Polo 3

Coliseo Bicentenario, Bucaramanga
Attendance: 35
Referees: Franco Ronconi (ARG), Larissa Sales Rodrigues (BRA), Mariajesús Rocio González Chaparro (CHI)

22 June 2024
15:10

Boxscore

Mexico	60–62	Colombia
Scoring by quarter: 17–16, 16–16, 12–14, 15–16
Pts: Ana Zesati 15; Rebs: Johanna Flores 8 Asts: Grecia Martinez 6		Pts: Marta Moscarella 23; Rebs: Marta Moscarella 11; Asts: two players 2

Coliseo Bicentenario, Bucaramanga
Attendance: 150
Referees: Nicolas Zivieri (BRA), Julirys Guzman Laureano (PUR), Fei Xiang (CAN)

=== Semifinals ===
22 June 2024
17:40

Boxscore

United States	109–32	Argentina
Scoring by quarter: 31–14, 30–10, 19–4, 29–4
Pts: Sienna Betts 20; Rebs: Sarah Strong 9 Asts: two players 5		Pts: Ema Baldo 7 Rebs: Nerea Lagowski 7 Asts: Alma Bourgarel 3

Coliseo Bicentenario, Bucaramanga
Referees: Aline García (URU), Jesus Lopez Diaz (MEX), Carla Cristel Peña Moreta (DOM)

22 June 2024
20:10

Boxscore

Canada	85–46	Brazil
Scoring by quarter: 25–11, 20–9, 20–13, 20–13
Pts: Nyadieng Yiech 21; Rebs: Nyadieng Yiech 8 Asts: Jasmine Bascoe 5		Pts: Ayla McDowell 12; Rebs: Ayla McDowell 6 Asts: Maria Soares 4

Coliseo Bicentenario, Bucaramanga
Referees: Orlando Jose Varela Diaz (HND), Francisco Javier De Leon Ortega (PUR), Carlos Pallares (COL)

=== Seventh place game ===
23 June 2024
13:40

Boxscore

Mexico	81–55	Dominican Republic
Scoring by quarter: 16–10, 11–17, 33–19, 21–9
Pts: Valeria Mora 18; Rebs: Ana Zesati 13; Asts: Ana Zesati 5		Pts: Carmela Núñez 17; Rebs: Anny De Jesus 19; Asts: Arianna Mercado 5

Coliseo Bicentenario, Bucaramanga
Attendance: 25
Referees: Larissa Sales Rodrigues (BRA), Francisco Javier De Leon Ortega (PUR), Mariajesús Rocio González Chaparro (CHI)

=== Fifth place game ===
23 June 2024
16:10

Boxscore

Colombia	46–57	Puerto Rico
Scoring by quarter: 8–17, 5–12, 18–10, 15–18
Pts: Marta Moscarella 17; Rebs: Marta Moscarella 14; Asts: Lissa Forero 2		Pts: Dianne Crespo 13; Rebs: Diann Jackson 16; Asts: Adriana Robles 3

Coliseo Bicentenario, Bucaramanga
Attendance: 100
Referees: Franco Ronconi (ARG), Jesus Lopez Diaz (MEX), Carla Cristel Peña Moreta (DOM)

=== Third place game ===
23 June 2024
18:40

Boxscore

Brazil	66–73	Argentina
Scoring by quarter: 17–11, 15–23, 15–18, 19–21
Pts: Alexia Araujo 18; Rebs: Manuella Alves 12; Asts: Alexia Araujo 4		Pts: two players 16; Rebs: Nerea Lagowski 16; Asts: Alma Bourgarel 4

Coliseo Bicentenario, Bucaramanga
Attendance: 150
Referees: Aline García (URU), Julirys Guzman Laureano (PUR), Fei Xiang (CAN)

=== Final ===
23 June 2024
21:10

Boxscore

Canada	69–80	United States
Scoring by quarter: 14–23, 22–13, 15–22, 18–22
Pts: Jasmine Bascoe 18; Rebs: three players 5 Asts: Jasmine Bascoe 5		Pts: Kennedy Smith 18; Rebs: Joyce Edwards 13; Asts: Jasmine Davidson 4

Coliseo Bicentenario, Bucaramanga
Attendance: 400
Referees: Orlando Jose Varela Diaz (HND), Nicolas Zivieri (BRA), Carlos Pallares (COL)

== Statistics and awards ==
=== Awards ===
2024 FIBA U18 Women's AmeriCup winners

United States
12th title

Most Valuable Player
(United States) Joyce Edwards

All Tournament Team

- (Canada) Jasmine Bascoe
- (United States) Sienna Betts
- (United States) Joyce Edwards
- (Argentina) Nerea Lagowski
- (Brazil) Ayla McDowell

== Final ranking ==
Rank	Team	Record
1st place, gold medalist(s)	United States	6–0
2nd place, silver medalist(s)	Canada	5–1
3rd place, bronze medalist(s)	Argentina	4–2
4	Brazil	3–3
5	Puerto Rico	3–3
6	Colombia	2–4
7	Mexico	1–5
8	Dominican Republic	0–6

Qualified for the 2025 FIBA Under-19 Women's Basketball World Cup
