= Virgin Islands women's national under-17 basketball team =

U.S. Virgin Islands
- FIBA zone: FIBA Americas
- National federation: Virgin Islands Basketball Federation

U19 World Cup
- Appearances: None

U18 AmeriCup
- Appearances: None

U17 Centrobasket
- Appearances: 4
- Medals: None

The United States Virgin Islands women's national under-17 basketball team is a national basketball team of the United States Virgin Islands, administered by the Virgin Islands Basketball Federation. It represents the country in international under-17 women's basketball competitions.

== FIBA U17 Women's Centrobasket participations ==
Year	Result
2005	4th
2009	4th
2011	6th
2013	7th

== See also ==
- Virgin Islands women's national basketball team
- Virgin Islands men's national under-17 and under-18 basketball team
