= Nicaragua women's national under-17 basketball team =

Nicaragua
- FIBA zone: FIBA Americas
- National federation: Federación Nicaraguense de Baloncesto

U19 World Cup
- Appearances: None

U18 AmeriCup
- Appearances: None

U17 Centrobasket
- Appearances: 1 (2023)
- Medals: None

The Nicaragua women's national under-17 basketball team is a national basketball team of Nicaragua, administered by the Federación Nicaraguense de Baloncesto. It represents the country in international under-17 women's basketball competitions.

It appeared at the 2011 COCABA U17 Championship for Women.

Nicaragua were the hosts for the 2023 FIBA U17 Women's Centrobasket. The team finished in 5th place, with Marcela Ulloa achieving the highest points per game for the tournament.

== See also ==
- Nicaragua women's national basketball team
- Nicaragua women's national under-15 basketball team
