= 2016 FIBA Americas Under-18 Championship for Women =

2016 FIBA U18 Women's AmeriCup
11th FIBA Under-18 Women's Americas Basketball Championship

Tournament details
- Host country: Chile
- Dates: 13–17 July 2016
- Teams: 8
- Venue: 1 (in 1 host city)

Final positions
- Champions: United States (9th title)

Tournament statistics
- MVP: (United States) Lauren Cox
- Top scorer: (Brazil) Da Silva (18.8)
- Top rebounds: (Brazil) Da Silva (10.4)
- Top assists: (Brazil) Leite (5.8)
- PPG (Team): United States (104.0)
- RPG (Team): Canada (59.8)
- APG (Team): United States (25.6)

Official website
- 2016 FIBA Americas U-18 Championship for Women

The 2016 FIBA Americas Under-18 Championship for Women was an international basketball competition that took place in Valdivia, Chile from July 13–17, 2016. It was the eleventh edition of the championship, and was the FIBA Americas qualifying tournament for the 2017 FIBA Under-19 World Championship for Women. Eight national teams from across the Americas, composed of women aged 19 and under, competed in the tournament. The United States won their eighth consecutive gold in this event by beating Canada in the final, 109–62.

== Participating teams ==
- North America:
  - United States
  - Canada
- Central America:
  - Mexico
  - Puerto Rico
  - Guatemala
- South America:
  - Brazil
  - Venezuela
  - Chile (hosts)

== Preliminary round ==
The draw was held on 14 April 2016.

All times are local (UTC-4).

=== Group A ===
Pos	Team	Pld	W	L	PF	PA	PD	Pts	Qualification
1	United States	3	3	0	307	143	+164	6	Advance to Semifinals
2	Brazil	3	2	1	236	173	+63	5	Advance to Semifinals
3	Venezuela	3	1	2	184	235	−51	4	Classification 5–8
4	Guatemala	3	0	3	132	308	−176	3	Classification 5–8

Source: Standings

13 July
15:45

Boxscore

Venezuela	50–68	Brazil
Scoring by quarter: 6–17, 17–16, 10–28, 17–7
Pts: Fajardo 10; Rebs: Betancourt 6 Asts: Quero 4		Pts: L. Da Silva, R. Da Silva 17; Rebs: R. Da Silva 10; Asts: Leite 7

Coliseo Municipal de Valdivia, Valdivia
Referees: Alexis Mercado (PUR), Felipe Ibarra (CHI), Andrés Laulhe (URU)

13 July
18:00

Boxscore

United States	117–32	Guatemala
Scoring by quarter: 32–9, 32–10, 20–8, 33–5
Pts: Carter 17; Rebs: Boothe 13; Asts: Harris 8		Pts: Saucedo 8 Rebs: Rosales 5 Asts: Pinelo 2

Coliseo Municipal de Valdivia, Valdivia
Referees: Alejandra Gaytan (MEX), Pablo Mardones (CHI), Stephanie Nordlee (CAN)

14 July
13:30

Boxscore

Guatemala	57–82	Venezuela
Scoring by quarter: 15–26, 14–17, 17–21, 11–18
Pts: Rosales 14; Rebs: Rosales 6 Asts: Rosales 4		Pts: Veliz 19; Rebs: Torres 6 Asts: Torres 8

Coliseo Municipal de Valdivia, Valdivia
Referees: Alejandra Gaytan (MEX), Felipe Ibarra (CHI), Stephanie Nordlee (CAN)

14 July
18:00

Boxscore

Brazil	59–80	United States
Scoring by quarter: 16–25, 14–17, 13–18, 16–20
Pts: R. Da Silva 25; Rebs: R. Da Silva 11; Asts: Leite 6		Pts: Cox 13; Rebs: Cox 9 Asts: Evans 6

Coliseo Municipal de Valdivia, Valdivia
Referees: Jelena Smiljanic (SRB), Pablo Mardones (CHI), Alexis Mercado (PUR)

15 July
13:30

Boxscore

Venezuela	52–110	United States
Scoring by quarter: 17–36, 14–20, 9–23, 12–31
Pts: Quero 10; Rebs: Betancourt 8 Asts: Torres 6		Pts: Boehm 20; Rebs: Cox 10; Asts: Ramirez 6

Coliseo Municipal de Valdivia, Valdivia
Referees: Alexis Mercado (PUR), Alejandra Gaytan (MEX), Pablo Ignacio Mardones (CHI)

15 July
15:45

Boxscore

Guatemala	43–109	Brazil
Scoring by quarter: 13-24, 13-30, 10-31, 7-24
Pts: Cobar 9 Rebs: Saucedo 5 Asts: Zuleta 2		Pts: R. Da Silva 28; Rebs: R. Da Silva 12; Asts: Leite 9

Coliseo Municipal de Valdivia, Valdivia
Referees: Stephanie Nordlee (CAN), Felipe Ibarra (CHI), Andres Laulhe (URU)

=== Group B ===
Pos	Team	Pld	W	L	PF	PA	PD	Pts	Qualification
1	Canada	3	3	0	244	142	+102	6	Advance to Semifinals
2	Puerto Rico	3	2	1	207	214	−7	5	Advance to Semifinals
3	Mexico	3	1	2	202	224	−22	4	Classification 5–8
4	Chile	3	0	3	178	251	−73	3	Classification 5–8

Source: Standings

13 July
12:30

Boxscore

Mexico	56–87	Canada
Scoring by quarter: 19–16, 12–21, 12–26, 13–24
Pts: Tapia 14; Rebs: Rivera 5 Asts: González 2		Pts: Konig 19; Rebs: Masikewich 13; Asts: Konig 5

Coliseo Municipal de Valdivia, Valdivia
Referees: Cheryl Flores (USA), Ambar Ramírez (VEN), Cristhian Riquiac (GUA)

13 July
20:15

Boxscore

Chile	74–88	Puerto Rico
Scoring by quarter: 18–26, 10–21, 20–23, 26–18
Pts: Antero 25; Rebs: Cortés 15; Asts: Stevens 5		Pts: Oppenheimer 23; Rebs: Roldán 10; Asts: Pérez 7

Coliseo Municipal de Valdivia, Valdivia
Referees: Máximo Cruz (DOM), María Comodaro (BRA), Jelena Smiljanić (SRB)

14 July
15:45

Boxscore

Puerto Rico	72–71	Mexico
Scoring by quarter: 7–14, 27–25, 22–14, 16–18
Pts: Pagán 20; Rebs: Pagán 11; Asts: Pérez 9		Pts: Rosales 19; Rebs: Tapia 7 Asts: Tapia 7

Coliseo Municipal de Valdivia, Valdivia
Referees: Cheryl Flores (USA), María Comodaro (BRA), Cristhian Riquiac (GUA)

14 July
20:15

Boxscore

Canada	88–39	Chile
Scoring by quarter: 26–9, 22–13, 23–8, 17–9
Pts: Brewer 22; Rebs: Brown, Masikewich 12; Asts: Dodig, Epoch 3		Pts: Antero 7 Rebs: Cortés 7 Asts: Paegelow 4

Coliseo Municipal de Valdivia, Valdivia
Referees: Máximo Cruz (CHI), Andrés Laulhe (URU), Ambar Ramírez (VEN)

15 July
18:00

Boxscore

Puerto Rico	47–69	Canada
Scoring by quarter: 2–17, 16–13, 13–18, 16–21
Pts: Oppenheimer 14; Rebs: three players 6 Asts: Cancio 3		Pts: Jerome 22; Rebs: Jerome 10; Asts: Konig 5

Coliseo Municipal de Valdivia, Valdivia
Referees: Maximo Cruz (DOM), Ambar Ramirez (VEN), Jelena Smiljanić (SRB)

15 July
20:15

Boxscore

Chile	65–75	Mexico
Scoring by quarter: 22–19, 14–20, 15–18, 14–18
Pts: Antero 32; Rebs: Cardenas 8 Asts: Colossi, Garcia 3		Pts: Rivera 20; Rebs: Rivera 7 Asts: Tapia 4

Coliseo Municipal de Valdivia, Valdivia
Referees: Cheryl Flores (USA), Maria Comodaro (BRA), Cristhian Riquiac (GUA)

== Classification round ==
All times are local (UTC-4).

5th–8th
16 July
Venezuela	49
Chile	54
16 July
Mexico	65
Guatemala	38

Fifth place
17 July
Chile	51
Mexico	85
Seventh place
17 July
Venezuela	77
Guatemala	64

=== Classification 5–8 ===
16 July
13:30

Boxscore

Mexico	65–38	Guatemala
Scoring by quarter: 15–3, 8–17, 31–5, 11–13
Pts: Rivera, Rosales 10; Rebs: Rosales 9 Asts: Tapia 4		Pts: Pinelo 12; Rebs: Gonzalez, A. Rosales 7 Asts: Pinelo 4

Coliseo Municipal de Valdivia, Valdivia
Referees: Stephanie Nordlee (CAN), Maria Comodaro (BRA), Ambar Ramirez (VEN)

16 July
15:45

Boxscore

Venezuela	49–54	Chile
Scoring by quarter: 13–15, 16–11, 12–9, 8–19
Pts: Diaz 9 Rebs: Zamaro 12; Asts: Torres 4		Pts: Arcos 16; Rebs: Stevens 12; Asts: Garcia 5

Coliseo Municipal de Valdivia, Valdivia
Referees: Alexis Mercado (PUR), Cristhian Riquiac (GUA), Cheryl Flores (USA)

=== Seventh place game ===
17 July
13:30

Boxscore

Venezuela	77–64	Guatemala
Scoring by quarter: 23–17, 14–17, 20–14, 20–16
Pts: Diaz 31; Rebs: Zamaro 13; Asts: Torres, Quero 5		Pts: Pinelo 12; Rebs: Pinelo 6 Asts: Pinelo 10

Coliseo Municipal de Valdivia, Valdivia
Referees: Maximo Cruz (DOM), Andres Laulhe (URU), Alexis Pacheco (PUR)

=== Fifth place game ===
17 July
15:45

Boxscore

Chile	51–85	Mexico
Scoring by quarter: 8–8, 12–19, 13–34, 18–24
Pts: Antero 13; Rebs: Cortes 8 Asts: García 5		Pts: Villalobos 22; Rebs: Tapia 8 Asts: Tapia, Xicontencatl 6

Coliseo Municipal de Valdivia, Valdivia
Referees: Cheryl Flores (USA), Christian Riquiac (GUA), Ambar Ramirez (VEN)

== Final round ==
All times are local (UTC-4).

Semifinals
16 July
United States	104
Puerto Rico	36
16 July
Canada	58
Brazil	52

Final
17 July
United States	109
Canada	62
Third place
17 July
Puerto Rico	64
Brazil	70

=== Semifinals ===
16 July
18:00

Boxscore

United States	104–36	Puerto Rico
Scoring by quarter: 23–14, 25–3, 27–10, 29–9
Pts: Carter 17; Rebs: Cox 13; Asts: Harris 9		Pts: Rodriguez 15; Rebs: Pagan 5 Asts: Perez 2

Coliseo Municipal de Valdivia, Valdivia
Referees: Maximo Cruz (DOM), Andres Laulhe (URU), Pablo Mardones (CHI)

16 July
20:15

Boxscore

Canada	58–52	Brazil
Scoring by quarter: 10–12, 12–18, 14–17, 22–5
Pts: Jerome 16; Rebs: Jerome 12; Asts: Epoch 3		Pts: R. Da Silva 18; Rebs: R. Da Silva 14; Asts: L. Da Silva 4

Coliseo Municipal de Valdivia, Valdivia
Referees: Jelena Smiljanic (SRB), Alejandra Gaytan (MEX), Felipe Ibarra (CHI)

=== Third place game ===
17 July
18:00

Boxscore

Puerto Rico	64–70	Brazil
Scoring by quarter: 12–17, 12–6, 13–19, 27–28
Pts: Rodríguez 28; Rebs: Rodríguez 6 Asts: Pérez 7		Pts: Bispo 20; Rebs: Bispo 9 Asts: Leite 5

Coliseo Municipal de Valdivia, Valdivia
Referees: Alejandra Gaytan (MEX), Pablo Mardones (CHI), Stephanie Nordlee (CAN)

=== Final ===
17 July
20:15

Boxscore

United States	109–62	Canada
Scoring by quarter: 23–20, 28–14, 33–14, 25–14
Pts: Harris 18; Rebs: Cox 9 Asts: Carter 5		Pts: Brewer 16; Rebs: Jerome 8 Asts: Konig 3

Coliseo Municipal de Valdivia, Valdivia
Referees: Jelena Smiljanic (SRB), Maria Comodaro (BRA), Felipe Ibarra (CHI)

== Awards ==
2016 FIBA Americas Under-18
Championship for Women winners

United States
9th title

Most Valuable Player
(United States) Lauren Cox

== Final ranking ==
Qualified for the 2017 FIBA Under-19 Women's Basketball World Cup
Suspended from the 2017 FIBA Under-19 Women's Basketball World Cup

Rank	Team	Record
1st place, gold medalist(s)	United States	5–0
2nd place, silver medalist(s)	Canada	4–1
3rd place, bronze medalist(s)	Brazil*	3–2
4	Puerto Rico	2–3
5	Mexico	3–2
6	Chile	1–4
7	Venezuela	2–3
8	Guatemala	0–5

* Brazil qualified for the tournament but was suspended by FIBA. A fourth team from FIBA Americas had to be named to take Brazil's place. The draw took place with the fourth FIBA Americas team's identity yet to be named. On 12 May 2017, Mexico was chosen to replace Brazil.
