= 2018 FIBA Under-18 Women's Americas Championship =

2018 FIBA U18 Women's AmeriCup
12th FIBA Under-18 Women's Americas Basketball Championship

Tournament details
- Host country: Mexico
- Dates: 1–7 August
- Teams: 8 (from 1 confederation)
- Venue: 1 (in 1 host city)

Final positions
- Champions: United States (10th title)

Tournament statistics
- MVP: (United States) Rhyne Howard
- Top scorer: (Colombia) Caicedo (16.5)
- Top rebounds: (Canada) Morra (10.7)
- Top assists: (Colombia) Caicedo (4.7)
- PPG (Team): (United States) (93.2)
- RPG (Team): (United States) (58.7)
- APG (Team): (United States) (20.5)

Official website
- 2018 FIBA Americas U-18 Championship for Women

The 2018 FIBA Under-18 Women's Americas Championship is an international basketball competition that currently takes place from August 1–7, 2018 in Mexico City, Mexico. This is the twelfth edition of the championship, and is the FIBA Americas qualifying tournament for the 2019 FIBA Under-19 Women's Basketball World Cup in Thailand. Eight national teams from across the Americas, composed of women aged 19 and under, will compete in the tournament.

== Participating teams ==
- North America:
  - United States
  - Canada
- Central America: 2017 Centrobasket U17 Women's Championship in Aguada, Puerto Rico - 15–19 August 2017
  - Mexico (hosts)
  - Puerto Rico
  - El Salvador
- South America: 2017 South American U17 Women’s Championship in Sucre, Bolivia - 28 June–2 July 2017
  - Argentina
  - Colombia
  - Chile

== Preliminary round ==
The draw was held in Mexico City, Mexico on 10 July 2018.

All times are local (UTC-5).

=== Group A ===
Pos	Team	Pld	W	L	PF	PA	PD	Pts
1	United States	3	3	0	305	140	+165	6
2	Argentina	3	2	1	203	203	0	5
3	Puerto Rico	3	1	2	193	251	−58	4
4	Chile	3	0	3	164	271	−107	3

Source: FIBA Americas

1 August 2018
14:00

Boxscore

Puerto Rico	74–69	Chile
Scoring by quarter: 18−19, 18–18, 21–12, 17–20
Pts: Rosario 15; Rebs: Vargas 14; Asts: Rosario, Laureano 3		Pts: Ljubetic 17; Rebs: Merino, Álvarez 6 Asts: García 6

Gimnasio Olímpico Juan de la Barrera, Mexico City
Referees: Alejandra Gaytan (MEX), Mario Antonio Granados Santos (SLV), Leydys Castellon Baro (CUB)

1 August 2018
18:30

Boxscore

United States	87–42	Argentina
Scoring by quarter: 18–8, 20–7, 23–12, 26–15
Pts: Blackwell, Smith 13; Rebs: Prince 9 Asts: Brown 5		Pts: Suarez 8 Rebs: Suarez 7 Asts: Fontana, Acevedo 2

Gimnasio Olímpico Juan de la Barrera, Mexico City
Referees: Hortencia Sanchez (MEX), Rodrigo Leon Mejia Mesa (COL), Kelsey Kisilevich (CAN)

2 August 2018
14:00

Boxscore

Chile	39–115	United States
Scoring by quarter: 17–35, 4–31, 13–25, 5–24
Pts: Ovalle 11; Rebs: Garay, Vargas 4 Asts: García 3		Pts: Williams 19; Rebs: Prince 11; Asts: Blackwell 5

Gimnasio Olímpico Juan de la Barrera, Mexico City
Referees: Alejandra Gaytan (MEX), Rodrigo Leon Mejia Mesa (COL), Kelsey Kisilevich (CAN)

2 August 2018
18:30

Boxscore

Argentina	79–60	Puerto Rico
Scoring by quarter: 14–10, 16–12, 29–15, 20–23
Pts: Castro 14; Rebs: Castro 12; Asts: Acevedo 6		Pts: Reyes 13; Rebs: Vargas 6 Asts: 5 players 1

Gimnasio Olímpico Juan de la Barrera, Mexico City
Referees: Yuliet Mendez Álvarez (CUB), Mario Antonio Granados Santos (SLV), Hortencia Sanchez (MEX)

3 August 2018
14:00

Boxscore

Argentina	82–56	Chile
Scoring by quarter: 26–12, 17–12, 23–12, 16–20
Pts: Suarez 12; Rebs: Castro 12; Asts: Operto, Gentinetta 3		Pts: Retamales 15; Rebs: Álvarez 5 Asts: García 3

Gimnasio Olímpico Juan de la Barrera, Mexico City
Referees: Hortencia Sanchez (MEX), Yuliet Mendez Álvarez (CUB), Kelsey Kisilevich (CAN)

3 August 2018
18:30

Boxscore

Puerto Rico	59–103	United States
Scoring by quarter: 18–33, 15–17, 15–28, 11–25
Pts: Rosario 17; Rebs: Reyes, Cotto 4 Asts: Reyes 4		Pts: Smith 24; Rebs: Joens, Caldwell 8 Asts: Brown, Nelson-Ododa 3

Gimnasio Olímpico Juan de la Barrera, Mexico City
Referees: Alejandra Gaytan (MEX), Rodrigo Leon Mejia Mesa (COL), Mario Antonio Granados Santos (SLV)

=== Group B ===
Pos	Team	Pld	W	L	PF	PA	PD	Pts
1	Canada	3	3	0	219	155	+64	6
2	Colombia	3	2	1	217	199	+18	5
3	Mexico (H)	3	1	2	220	201	+19	4
4	El Salvador	3	0	3	148	249	−101	3

Source: FIBA Americas
(H) Hosts

1 August 2018
16:00

Boxscore

Colombia	49–73	Canada
Scoring by quarter: 9–17, 11–25, 16–12, 13–19
Pts: Álvarez 19; Rebs: Paz 8 Asts: Caicedo 4		Pts: Morra 17; Rebs: Morra 12; Asts: three players 3

Gimnasio Olímpico Juan de la Barrera, Mexico City
Referees: Tiara Cruse (USA), Micaela Prado (ARG), Rebeca Xiomaira Davila Aquino (PUR)

1 August 2018
20:30

Boxscore

Mexico	88–48	El Salvador
Scoring by quarter: 31–12, 18–10, 20–6, 19–20
Pts: Salinas 14; Rebs: three players 5 Asts: Gallegos 6		Pts: Villalobos 18; Rebs: Villalobos 11; Asts: Murcia 4

Gimnasio Olímpico Juan de la Barrera, Mexico City
Referees: Yuliet Mendez Álvarez (CUB), Arlen Yesenia Aguilar García (GUA), Felipe Guillermo Valenzuela Barrera (CHI)

2 August 2018
16:00

Boxscore

El Salvador	52–81	Canada
Scoring by quarter: 9–23, 11–23, 13–19, 19–16
Pts: Villalobos 15; Rebs: Villalobos 10; Asts: A. Rodríguez 4		Pts: Becker 15; Rebs: De Sousa Martins 12; Asts: Washington, Makolo 3

Gimnasio Olímpico Juan de la Barrera, Mexico City
Referees: Micaela Prado (ARG), Leydys Castellon Baro (CUB), Arlen Yesenia Aguilar García (GUA)

2 August 2018
20:30

Boxscore

Mexico	78–88	Colombia
Scoring by quarter: 24–13, 19–28, 17–26, 18–21
Pts: Salinas 22; Rebs: Aguilera 8 Asts: Gallegos 6		Pts: Caicedo 30; Rebs: Gonzalez 8 Asts: three players 2

Gimnasio Olímpico Juan de la Barrera, Mexico City
Referees: Tiara Cruse (USA), Rebeca Xiomaira Davila Aquino (PUR), Felipe Guillermo Valenzuela Barrera (CHI)

3 August 2018
16:00

Boxscore

Colombia	80–48	El Salvador
Scoring by quarter: 21–12, 16–12, 24–13, 19–11
Pts: Caicedo 22; Rebs: three players 7 Asts: Caicedo 5		Pts: García 12; Rebs: Villalobos 10; Asts: A. Rodríguez 6

Gimnasio Olímpico Juan de la Barrera, Mexico City
Referees: Felipe Guillermo Valenzuela Barrera (CHI), Micaela Prado (ARG), Rebeca Xiomaira Davila Aquino (PUR)

3 August 2018
20:30

Boxscore

Canada	65–54	Mexico
Scoring by quarter: 17–13, 17–6, 14–18, 17–17
Pts: Makolo 13; Rebs: Morra 16; Asts: Cote-Lysius, Becker 2		Pts: Martínez 16; Rebs: Salinas, Aguilera 7 Asts: Rodríguez 3

Gimnasio Olímpico Juan de la Barrera, Mexico City
Referees: Tiara Cruse (USA), Leydys Castellon Baro (CUB), Arlen Yesenia Aguilar García (GUA)

== Knockout stage ==
=== Bracket ===
Fifth place
3A	Puerto Rico	61
4A	Chile	54
Seventh place
4B	El Salvador	61
3B	Mexico	83

5–8th place semifinals
4B	El Salvador	56
3A	Puerto Rico	70
3B	Mexico	69
4A	Chile	71

Quarterfinals
1A	United States	87
4B	El Salvador	27
3A	Puerto Rico	58
2B	Colombia	85
2A	Argentina	89
3B	Mexico	62
4A	Chile	52
1B	Canada	98

Semifinals
1A	United States	83
2B	Colombia	47
2A	Argentina	71
1B	Canada	77

Final
1A	United States	84
1B	Canada	60
Third place
2B	Colombia	52
2A	Argentina	62

=== Quarterfinals ===
5 August 2018
14:00

Boxscore

United States	87–27	El Salvador
Scoring by quarter: 24–6, 27–13, 17–2, 19–6
Pts: Nelson-Ododa 14; Rebs: Nelson-Ododa 8 Asts: Blackwell, Howard 4		Pts: Villalobos 7 Rebs: Villalobos, García 3 Asts: Torres 2

Gimnasio Olímpico Juan de la Barrera, Mexico City
Referees: Hortencia Sanchez (MEX), Leydys Castellon Baro (CUB), Kelsey Kisilevich (CAN)

5 August 2018
16:00

Boxscore

Chile	52–98	Canada
Scoring by quarter: 7–22, 22–17, 9–31, 14–28
Pts: Retamales 16; Rebs: Merino, Vargas 6 Asts: Retamales 3		Pts: Morra 21; Rebs: Hanson 11; Asts: King 8

Gimnasio Olímpico Juan de la Barrera, Mexico City
Referees: Rebeca Xiomaira Davila Aquino (PUR), Mario Antonio Granados Santos (SLV), Arlen Yesenia Aguilar Garcia (GUA)

5 August 2018
18:30

Boxscore

Puerto Rico	58–85	Colombia
Scoring by quarter: 18–19, 14–15, 14–31, 12–20
Pts: Vargas 15; Rebs: Sanchez 8 Asts: Penzo 3		Pts: Pineda 29; Rebs: Gonzalez 14; Asts: Caicedo 8

Gimnasio Olímpico Juan de la Barrera, Mexico City
Referees: Alejandra Gaytan (MEX), Micaela Prado (ARG), Felipe Guillermo Valenzuela Barrera (CHI)

5 August 2018
20:30

Boxscore

Argentina	89–62	Mexico
Scoring by quarter: 19–14, 20–12, 27–19, 23–17
Pts: Chagas 24; Rebs: Fontana 9 Asts: Suarez 6		Pts: Paz y Puente 11; Rebs: Montes 6 Asts: Tejada, Paz y Puente 2

Gimnasio Olímpico Juan de la Barrera, Mexico City
Referees: Tiara Cruse (USA), Rodrigo Leon Mejia Mesa (COL), Yuliet Mendez Alvarez (CUB)

=== 5–8th place semifinals ===
6 August 2018
14:00

Boxscore

El Salvador	56–70	Puerto Rico
Scoring by quarter: 14–16, 15–12, 13–20, 14–22
Pts: Villalobos 14; Rebs: Villalobos 6 Asts: A. Rodríguez 3		Pts: Vargas 20; Rebs: Vargas 10; Asts: Laureano 6

Gimnasio Olímpico Juan de la Barrera, Mexico City
Referees: Rodrigo Leon Mejia Mesa (COL), Micaela Prado (ARG), Arlen Yesenia Aguilar Garcia (GUA)

6 August 2018
16:00

Boxscore

Mexico	69–71	Chile
Scoring by quarter: 19–16, 10–19, 11–16, 29–20
Pts: Paz y Puente 17; Rebs: Martínez, Salinas 9 Asts: Gallegos 5		Pts: Retamales 17; Rebs: García, Retamales 6 Asts: García 7

Gimnasio Olímpico Juan de la Barrera, Mexico City
Referees: Rebeca Xiomaira Davila Aquino (PUR), Mario Antonio Granados Santos (SLV), Kelsey Kisilevich (CAN)

=== Semifinals ===
6 August 2018
18:30

Boxscore

United States	83–47	Colombia
Scoring by quarter: 19–18, 23–8, 16–15, 25–6
Pts: Brown 17; Rebs: Davenport 11; Asts: Peoples, Howard 5		Pts: Álvarez 19; Rebs: Paz 10; Asts: Caicedo 5

Gimnasio Olímpico Juan de la Barrera, Mexico City
Referees: Alejandra Gaytan (MEX), Yuliet Mendez Alvarez (CUB), Leydys Castellon Baro (CUB)

6 August 2018
20:30

Boxscore

Argentina	71–77	Canada
Scoring by quarter: 14–19, 17–17, 16–19, 24–22
Pts: Chagas 26; Rebs: Chagas 6 Asts: Acevedo 6		Pts: Morra 15; Rebs: Morra 14; Asts: 4 players 2

Gimnasio Olímpico Juan de la Barrera, Mexico City
Referees: Tiara Cruse (USA), Hortencia Sanchez (MEX), Felipe Guillermo Valenzuela Barrera (CHI)

=== Seventh place game ===
7 August 2018
14:00

Boxscore

El Salvador	61–83	Mexico
Scoring by quarter: 17–25, 9–15, 13–20, 22–23
Pts: Villalobos 24; Rebs: Villalobos 9 Asts: Villalobos 3		Pts: Martínez 29; Rebs: Martínez 8 Asts: 7 players 2

Gimnasio Olímpico Juan de la Barrera, Mexico City
Referees: Felipe Guillermo Valenzuela Barrera (CHI), Micaela Prado (ARG), Kelsey Kisilevich (CAN)

=== Fifth place game ===
7 August 2018

Boxscore

Puerto Rico	61–54	Chile
Scoring by quarter: –, –, –, –

Gimnasio Olímpico Juan de la Barrera, Mexico City

=== Third place game ===
7 August 2018

Boxscore

Colombia	52–62	Argentina
Scoring by quarter: –, –, –, –

Gimnasio Olímpico Juan de la Barrera, Mexico City

=== Final ===
7 August 2018
20:30

Boxscore

United States	84–60	Canada
Scoring by quarter: 14–18, 25–13, 25–9, 20–20
Pts: Smith 18; Rebs: three players 6 Asts: Peoples, Williams 5		Pts: Morra 13; Rebs: Becker 7 Asts: Makolo 4

Gimnasio Olímpico Juan de la Barrera, Mexico City
Referees: Alejandra Gaytán (MEX), Hortencia Sánchez (MEX), Leydys Castellon (CUB)

== Final ranking ==
Qualified for the 2019 FIBA Under-19 Women's Basketball World Cup

Rank	Team	Record
1st place, gold medalist(s)	United States	6–0
2nd place, silver medalist(s)	Canada	5–1
3rd place, bronze medalist(s)	Argentina	4–2
4	Colombia	3–3
5	Puerto Rico	3–3
6	Chile	1–5
7	Mexico	2–4
8	El Salvador	0–6
