= Puerto Rico women's national under-19 basketball team =

Basketball team of Puerto Rico

Puerto Rico
- Joined FIBA: 1957
- FIBA zone: FIBA Americas
- National federation: Puerto Rican Basketball Federation
- Coach: Jerry Batista
- Nickname: 12 Magníficas

U19 World Cup
- Appearances: 2
- Medals: None

U18 AmeriCup
- Appearances: 14
- Medals: (silver) Silver: 1 (2004)

U17 Centrobasket
- Appearances: 8
- Medals: (gold) Gold: 3 (2005, 2011, 2023); (silver) Silver: 4 (2009, 2015, 2017, 2019); (bronze) Bronze: 1 (2013)
Home	Away

The Puerto Rico women's national under-17, under-18 and under-19 basketball team is a national basketball team of Puerto Rico, administered by the Puerto Rican Basketball Federation (Spanish: Federación de Baloncesto de Puerto Rico), abbreviated as FBPUR. It represents the country in international under-17, under-18 and under-19 women's basketball competitions.

== FIBA U17 Women's Centrobasket participations ==
Year	Result
2005	1st place, gold medalist(s)
2009	2nd place, silver medalist(s)
2011	1st place, gold medalist(s)
2013	3rd place, bronze medalist(s)
2015	2nd place, silver medalist(s)
2017	2nd place, silver medalist(s)
2019	2nd place, silver medalist(s)
2023	1st place, gold medalist(s)

== FIBA Under-18 Women's AmeriCup participations ==
Year	Result
1988	6th
1992	4th
2000	8th
2004	2nd place, silver medalist(s)
2006	6th
2008	6th
2010	7th

Year	Result
2012	5th
2014	5th
2016	4th
2018	5th
2022	7th
2024	5th
2026	7th

== FIBA Under-19 Women's Basketball World Cup participations ==
Year	Result
2005	10th
2017	14th

== See also ==
- Puerto Rico women's national basketball team
- Puerto Rico women's national under-17 basketball team
- Puerto Rico men's national under-19 basketball team
