= Canada women's national under-19 basketball team =

Canada
- FIBA zone: FIBA Americas
- National federation: Canada Basketball
- Coach: Marlo Davis

FIBA U19 World Cup
- Appearances: 12
- Medals: (bronze) Bronze: 2 (2017, 2023)

FIBA U18 AmeriCup
- Appearances: 15
- Medals: (silver) Silver: 8 (2006, 2008, 2014, 2016, 2018, 2022, 2024, 2026); (bronze) Bronze: 2 (2004, 2010)
Home	Away

The Canada women's national under-19 basketball team represents Canada in international under-18 and under-19 women's basketball competitions. They are overseen by Canada Basketball, the governing body for basketball in Canada.

== Competitive record ==
=== FIBA U19 Women's World Cup ===
Year	Result	Position	Pld	W	L	Ref
(United States) 1985	Consolation round	8th	6	1	5	
(Spain) 1989	Did not qualify					
(South Korea) 1993	Did not qualify					
(Brazil) 1997	Did not qualify					
(Czech Republic) 2001	Did not qualify					
(Tunisia) 2005	Consolation round	9th	7	3	4	
(Slovakia) 2007	Consolation round	9th	8	3	5	
(Thailand) 2009	Semifinals	4th	9	4	5	
(Chile) 2011	Quarterfinals	5th	9	8	1	
(Lithuania) 2013	Quarterfinals	7th	9	4	5	
(Russia) 2015	Quarterfinals	8th	7	2	5	
(Italy) 2017	Semifinals	3rd place, bronze medalist(s)	7	6	1	
(Thailand) 2019	Quarterfinals	6th	7	4	3	
(Hungary) 2021	Quarterfinals	5th	7	4	3	
(Spain) 2023	Semifinals	3rd place, bronze medalist(s)	7	6	1	
(Czech Republic) 2025	Semifinals	4th	7	5	2	
(China) 2027	Qualified					
Total	0 titles	12/16	90	50	40	—

=== FIBA U18 Women's AmeriCup ===
Year	Result
1988	4th
1992	5th
1996	5th
2000	5th
2004	3rd place, bronze medalist(s)
2006	2nd place, silver medalist(s)
2008	2nd place, silver medalist(s)
2010	3rd place, bronze medalist(s)

Year	Result
2012	4th
2014	2nd place, silver medalist(s)
2016	2nd place, silver medalist(s)
2018	2nd place, silver medalist(s)
2022	2nd place, silver medalist(s)
2024	2nd place, silver medalist(s)
2026	2nd place, silver medalist(s)

== See also ==
- Canada women's national basketball team
- Canada women's national under-17 basketball team
- Canada men's national under-19 basketball team
