= Ivory Coast women's national under-16 basketball team =

Ivory Coast
- FIBA zone: FIBA Africa
- National federation: Fédération Ivoirienne de Basket-Ball
- Coach: Thoms N'da

U17 World Cup
- Appearances: 1

U16 AfroBasket
- Appearances: 2
- Medals: (silver) Silver: (2025)

The Ivory Coast women's national under-16 basketball team is a national basketball team of the Ivory Coast, administered by the Fédération Ivoirienne de Basket-Ball. It represents the country in international under-16 women's basketball competitions.

== Tournament record ==
=== FIBA Under-17 World Cup ===
| Year | Pos. | Pld | W | L |
|---|---|---|---|---|
| (France) 2010 | Did not qualify | | | |
| (Netherlands) 2012 | Did not qualify | | | |
| (Czech Republic) 2014 | Did not qualify | | | |
| (Spain) 2016 | Did not qualify | | | |
| (Belarus) 2018 | Did not qualify | | | |
| (Hungary) 2022 | Did not qualify | | | |
| (Mexico) 2024 | Did not qualify | | | |
| (Czech Republic) 2026 | Qualified | | | |
| (Indonesia) 2028 | 16th | 7 | 0 | 7 |
| Total | 1/9 | 7 | 0 | 7 |

=== FIBA U16 AfroBasket ===
| Year | Pos. | Pld | W | L |
|---|---|---|---|---|
| (Mali) 2009 | Did not qualify | | | |
| (Egypt) 2011 | Did not qualify | | | |
| (Mozambique) 2013 | 6th | 6 | 2 | 4 |
| (Madagascar) 2015 | Did not qualify | | | |
| (Mozambique) 2017 | Did not qualify | | | |
| (Rwanda) 2019 | Did not qualify | | | |
| (Egypt) 2021 | Did not qualify | | | |
| (Tunisia) 2023 | Did not qualify | | | |
| (Rwanda) 2025 | 2nd | 6 | 4 | 2 |
| Total | 2/9 | 12 | 6 | 6 |

== See also ==
- Ivory Coast women's national basketball team
- Ivory Coast women's national under-19 basketball team
- Ivory Coast men's national under-16 basketball team
