= Tunisia women's national under-16 basketball team =

Tunisia
- Joined FIBA: 1956
- FIBA zone: FIBA Africa
- National federation: FTBB
- Nickname(s): نسور قرطاج (Eagles of Carthage)

U17 World Cup
- Appearances: None

U16 AfroBasket
- Appearances: 5
- Medals: None

U16 EuroBasket
- Appearances: 1
- Medals: None

U16 Women's Arab Championship
- Appearances: 1
- Medals: (silver) Silver: 1 (2023)
Home	Away
Medal record
Event	1st	2nd	3rd
U16 Women's Arab Championship	0	1	0
Total	0	1	1

The Tunisia women's national under-16 basketball team (Arabic: منتخب تونس تحت 16 سنة لكرة السلة للسيدات), nicknamed Les Aigles de Carthage (The Eagles of Carthage or The Carthage Eagles), is a national basketball team of Tunisia, administered by the Tunisia Basketball Federation (FTBB). It represents the country in international under-16 women's basketball competitions.

== Competitive record ==
Champions Runners-up Third place Fourth place

- Red border color indicates tournament was held on home soil.

=== FIBA U17 Women's World Cup ===
FIBA Under-17 Women's Basketball World Cup
Appearances: 0
Year	Position	Host
(France) 2010	Did not participate	Rodez / Toulouse, France
(Netherlands) 2012	Did not participate	Amsterdam, Netherlands
(Czech Republic) 2014	Did not participate	Klatovy / Plzeň, Czech Republic
(Spain) 2016	Did not participate	Zaragoza, Spain
(Belarus) 2018	Did not participate	Minsk, Belarus
(Romania) 2020	Cancelled due to the COVID-19 pandemic	
(Hungary) 2022	Did not participate	Debrecen, Hungary
(Mexico) 2024	Did not qualify	León / Irapuato, Mexico
(Czech Republic) 2026	Did not qualify	Brno, Czech Republic
(Indonesia) 2028	To be determined	Indonesia

=== FIBA U16 Women's AfroBasket ===
FIBA U16 Women's AfroBasket
Appearances: 5
Year	Position	Host
(Mali) 2009	Did not participate	Bamako, Mali
(Egypt) 2011	4th	Alexandria, Egypt
(Mozambique) 2013	4th	Maputo, Mozambique
(Madagascar) 2015	6th	Antananarivo, Madagascar
(Mozambique) 2017	Did not participate	Beira, Mozambique
(Rwanda) 2019	Did not participate	Kigali, Rwanda
(Egypt) 2021	Did not participate	Cairo, Egypt
(Tunisia) 2023	4th	Monastir, Tunisia
(Rwanda) 2025	8th	Kigali, Rwanda

=== FIBA U16 Women's EuroBasket ===
FIBA U16 Women's EuroBasket
Appearances: 1
Year	Position	Host
(Spain) 1978	15th	Cuenca, Spain

=== Arab U16 Women's Basketball Championship ===
Arab U16 Women's Basketball Championship
Appearances: 1
Year	Position	Host
(Jordan) 2023	Silver (silver)	Amman, Jordan

== See also ==
- Tunisia women's national basketball team
- Tunisia women's national under-20 basketball team
- Tunisia women's national under-19 basketball team
- Tunisia men's national under-16 basketball team
