= Mozambique women's national under-16 basketball team =

Mozambique
- Joined FIBA: 1978
- FIBA zone: FIBA Africa
- National federation: Federação Moçambicana de Basquetebol

U17 World Cup
- Appearances: None

U16 AfroBasket
- Appearances: 5
- Medals: (bronze) Bronze: 1 (2013)
Away

The Mozambique women's national under-16 basketball team is a national basketball team of Mozambique, administered by the Federação Moçambicana de Basquetebol. It represents the country in international under-16 women's basketball competitions.

== FIBA U16 Women's AfroBasket record ==
Year	Pos.	Pld	W	L
(Mali) 2009	Did not participate			
(Egypt) 2011	6th	5	0	5
(Mozambique) 2013	3rd	6	4	2
(Madagascar) 2015	4th	7	4	3
(Mozambique) 2017	4th	6	1	5
(Rwanda) 2019	4th	6	3	3
(Egypt) 2021	Did not participate			
(Tunisia) 2023	Did not participate			
Total	4/7	30	12	18

== Roster (2017) ==
Mozambique U-16 Basketball Team - 2015 FIBA Africa Championship roster
Players
Coaches

Pos.	No.	Name	Age – Date of birth	Height	Club	Ctr.
PG	4	Cleide Machava	16 – 16 February 2001	1.62 m (5 ft 4 in)	Bela Rosa	(Mozambique)
C	5	Angelica Jovo	15 – 17 October 2001	1.84 m (6 ft 0 in)		(Mozambique)
PF	6	Dorca Matsinhe	15 – 22 January 2002	1.71 m (5 ft 7 in)		(Mozambique)
C	7	Celia Sumbane	15 – 24 February 2002	1.56 m (5 ft 1 in)		(Mozambique)
	8	Sandra Magoliço	14 – 26 November 2002			(Mozambique)
	9	Noémia Massingue	16 – 10 March 2001			(United States)
	10	Michele Langa	15 – 6 February 2002			(Mozambique)
	11	Karen Quicimusso	16 – 24 June 2001			(Mozambique)
	12	Jennifer Sigauque	16 – 24 June 2001			(Mozambique)
	13	Chana Paxixe	15 – 16 April 2002			(Mozambique)
	14	Suraya Rijal	14 – 5 October 2002			(Mozambique)
	15	Nelly MCDonald	14 – 25 August 2002			(Mozambique)

Head coach

- Lucinha Martins

Assistant coach(es)

- Carlos Dezanove

Physio

Legend

- (C) Team captain
- nat field describes country
