= Bella Murekatete =

Rwandan basketball player

Personal information
- Born: 4 July 2000 (age 26)
- Listed height: 6 ft 3 in (1.91 m)

Career information
- High school: Genesis Prep (Post Falls, Idaho)
- College: Washington State (2019–2024)
- Position: Center

Career highlights
- Pac-12 co-Most Improved Player of the Year (2022)
- Stats at Basketball Reference

Bella Murekatete (born 4 July 2000) is a Rwandan professional basketball player for the Rwanda national team. She is believed to be the first Rwandan-born player in NCAA Division I women's basketball history. She was named the 2022 Pac-12 Conference co-Most Improved Player of the Year after averaging 10.3 points, 7.3 rebounds, and 1.7 blocks per game. She played college basketball for the Washington State Cougars.

== Early years ==
Murekatete grew up playing football and volleyball in her native Rwanda before discovering basketball. She moved to Post Falls, Idaho on an F-1 visa at the age of 14 to play the sport at Genesis Prep Academy. Murekatete was a three-time first-team all-state selection. She also played with North Idaho Elite on the Amateur Athletic Union (AAU) circuit. In November 2018, Murekatete signed a letter of intent to play at Washington State.

== National team career ==
Murekatete represented Rwanda at the 2015 FIBA Africa Under-16 Championship for Women, where she averaged 14.3 points and a tournament-best 22 rebounds per game and earned all-tournament honors. She notably recorded 24 points and 37 rebounds in a loss to Tunisia.

Murekatete represented Rwanda at the 2018 FIBA U18 Women's African Championship, where she averaged 16.8 points, 13.7 rebounds and 1.7 assists per game and earned all-tournament honors after leading her team to a fourth-place finish.

Murekatete made her debut with the senior national team in a 2023 Women's Afrobasket qualifier.
