= FIBA U16 Women's AfroBasket =

Under-16 continental basketball championship

- Most recent season or competition: 2025 FIBA U16 Women's AfroBasket
- Formerly: FIBA U16 Women's African Championship; FIBA Africa Under-16 Championship for Women
- Sport: Basketball
- Founded: 2009; 17 years ago
- Organizing body: FIBA Africa
- No. of teams: 12
- Continent: Africa
- Most recent champion: Egypt (1st title)
- Most titles: Mali (8 titles)
- Qualification: FIBA U17 Women's World Cup
- Related competitions: FIBA U18 Women's AfroBasket
- Website: fiba.basketball/history

The FIBA U16 Women's AfroBasket, previously known as the FIBA U16 Women's African Championship or the FIBA Africa Under-16 Championship for Women, is a biennial international youth basketball competition organized by FIBA Africa, where under-16 women's national teams participate.

The tournament also serves as a qualification for the FIBA Under-17 Women's Basketball World Cup, where the top two teams qualify.

== Summary ==
Year	Hosts	Final			Third place match		
Year	Hosts	Champions	Score	Runners-up	Third place	Score	Fourth place
2009; Details	(Mali); Bamako	Mali	78–64	Egypt	Angola	round-robin	Algeria
2011; Details	(Egypt); Alexandria	Mali	66–54	Egypt	Angola	59–55	Tunisia
2013; Details	(Mozambique); Maputo	Mali	62–61	Egypt	Mozambique	50–46	Tunisia
2015; Details	(Madagascar); Antananarivo	Mali	57–46	Nigeria	Angola	52–48	Mozambique
2017; Details	(Mozambique); Beira	Mali	68–29	Angola	Egypt	56–38	Mozambique
2019; Details	(Rwanda); Kigali	Mali	84–48	Egypt	Angola	67–59	Mozambique
2021; Details	(Egypt); Cairo	Mali	68–65	Egypt	Algeria	53–51	Uganda
2023; Details	(Tunisia); Monastir	Mali	57–56	Egypt	Angola	50–43	Tunisia
2025; Details	(Rwanda); Kigali	Egypt	66–54	Ivory Coast	Cameroon	55–53	Mali
2027; Details	(N/A); TBD		–			–	

== Medal table ==
Rank	Nation	Gold	Silver	Bronze	Total
1	Mali	8	0	0	8
2	Egypt	1	6	1	8
3	Angola	0	1	5	6
4	Ivory Coast	0	1	0	1
4	Nigeria	0	1	0	1
6	Algeria	0	0	1	1
6	Cameroon	0	0	1	1
6	Mozambique	0	0	1	1
Totals (8 entries)		9	9	9	27

== Participation details ==
Team	(Mali) 2009	(Egypt) 2011	(Mozambique) 2013	(Madagascar) 2015	(Mozambique) 2017	(Rwanda) 2019	(Egypt) 2021	(Tunisia) 2023	(Rwanda) 2025	(N/A) 2027	Total
Algeria	4th	5th					3rd				3
Angola	3rd	3rd	5th	3rd	2nd	3rd		3rd	5th		8
Botswana			8th								1
Cameroon									3rd	Q	2
Chad							5th				1
Egypt	2nd	2nd	2nd	7th	3rd	2nd	2nd	2nd	1st	Q	10
Gabon			7th				6th				2
Guinea								8th	11th		2
Ivory Coast			6th						2nd	Q	3
Kenya									10th		1
Madagascar				5th							1
Mali	1st	1st	1st	1st	1st	1st	1st	1st	4th	Q	10
Morocco				8th				5th	9th		3
Mozambique		6th	3rd	4th	4th	4th					5
Nigeria				2nd							1
Rwanda				9th		6th		7th	6th		4
Senegal	5th										1
Tanzania						7th			7th		2
Tunisia		4th	4th	6th				4th	8th		5
Uganda						5th	4th	6th			3
Zimbabwe					5th						1
Total	5	6	8	9	5	7	6	8	11	#	

== MVP Awards ==
Year	MVP Award Winner
2009	(Mali) Farima Touré
2011	(Egypt) Soraia Deghady
2013	(Mozambique) Neidy Ocuane
2015	(Mali) Rokia Doumbia
2017	(Mali) Aissetou Coulibaly
2019	(Angola) Sara Caetano
2021	(Mali) Rokiatou Berthe
2023	(Mali) Assitan Diarisso
2025	(Egypt) Fatma Abdella

== U17 Women's World Cup record ==
Team	(France) 2010	(Netherlands) 2012	(Czech Republic) 2014	(Spain) 2016	(Belarus) 2018	(Hungary) 2022	(Mexico) 2024	(Czech Republic) 2026	(Indonesia) 2028	Total
Angola					16th					1
Egypt			16th			11th	11th	9th		4
Ivory Coast								16th		1
Mali	12th	10th	12th	11th	10th	10th	13th			7
Nigeria				DNP*						0
Total	1	1	2	2	2	2	2	2	2	

* Nigeria were unable to travel to the tournament.

== Top Ten FIBA Africa girls' teams ==
Updated as of 13 December 2025.

Rank	Change	Team	Points
16	▼4	Mali	583.9
21	▲4	Egypt ^{C}	516.9
26	▲9	Nigeria	469.5
36	▲2	Cameroon	410.5
37	▼4	Angola	395.9
38	Same position	Ivory Coast	395.7
40	▼6	Uganda	330.3
42	▼5	Tunisia	310.2
43	▼3	Morocco	307.7
46	▲7	Tanzania	272

^{C} Current U16 Africa champions

== See also ==
- FIBA Women's AfroBasket
- FIBA U18 Women's AfroBasket
- FIBA U20 Women's AfroBasket
