= Madagascar women's national under-16 basketball team =

Madagascar
- FIBA zone: FIBA Africa
- National federation: Fédération Malagasy de Basket-Ball

U17 World Cup
- Appearances: None

U16 AfroBasket
- Appearances: 1 (2015)
- Medals: None

The Madagascar women's national under-16 basketball team is a national basketball team of Madagascar, administered by the Fédération Malagasy de Basket-Ball. It represents the country in international under-16 women's basketball competitions.

== FIBA U16 Women's AfroBasket participations ==
- 2015 FIBA Africa Under-16 Championship for Women – 5th place

== See also ==
- Madagascar women's national basketball team
- Madagascar women's national under-18 basketball team
- Madagascar men's national under-16 basketball team
