= Angola women's national under-16 and under-17 basketball team =

National women's team in Angola, Central Africa

Angola
- Joined FIBA: 1979
- FIBA zone: FIBA Africa
- National federation: Federação Angolana de Basquetebol

U17 World Cup
- Appearances: 1
- Medals: None

U16 AfroBasket
- Appearances: 8
- Medals: (silver) Silver: 1 (2017); (bronze) Bronze: 5 (2009, 2011, 2015, 2019, 2023)
Away

The Angola women's national under-16 and under-17 basketball team is a national basketball team of Angola, administered by the Federação Angolana de Basquetebol. It represents the country in international under-16 and under-17 women's basketball competitions.

== FIBA U16 Women's AfroBasket record ==
Year	Reached	Position	Pld	W	L	PF	PA	PD
(Mali) Bamako 2009	Semi-finals	3rd	4	2	2	225	221	+4
(Egypt) Cairo 2011	Semi-finals	3rd	7	3	4	391	423	−32
(Mozambique) Maputo 2013	Quarter-finals	5th	6	4	2	292	169	+123
(Madagascar) Antananarivo 2015	Semi-finals	3rd	7	4	3	428	442	−14
(Mozambique) Beira 2017	Final	2nd	6	3	3	290	312	−22
(Rwanda) Kigali 2019	Semi-finals	3rd	5	4	1	332	281	+51
(Egypt) Cairo 2021	Did not participate							
(Tunisia) Monastir & Jemmal 2023	Semi-finals	3rd	6	4	2	332	349	−17
(Rwanda) Kigali 2025	Quarter-finals	5th	5	2	3	270	234	+36
Total	8/9	0 titles	46	26	20	2,560	2,431	+129

== FIBA Under-17 Women's Basketball World Cup record ==
Year	Pos.	Pld	W	L
(France) 2010	Did not qualify			
(Netherlands) 2012	Did not qualify			
(Czech Republic) 2014	Did not qualify			
(Spain) 2016	Did not qualify			
(Belarus) 2018	16th	7	0	7
(Hungary) 2022	Did not participate			
(Mexico) 2024	Did not qualify			
(Czech Republic) 2026	Did not qualify			
(Indonesia) 2028	To be determined			
Total	1/9	7	0	7

== Current roster (2017) ==
Angola Women's U-16 Basketball Team - 2017 FIBA Africa Championship roster
Players
Coaches

Pos.	No.	Name	Age – Date of birth	Height	Club	Ctr.
PG	4	Elizete Elias	15 – 10 April 2002	1.65 m (5 ft 5 in)	C.P.P.L.	(Angola)
PG	5	Cristina Lourenço	16 – 1 May 2001	1.64 m (5 ft 5 in)	1º de Agosto	(Angola)
SG	6	Isidora Augusto	16 – 30 April 2001	1.66 m (5 ft 5 in)	Formiguinhas Cazenga	(Angola)
C	7	Helena Pululo	16 – 19 April 2001	1.79 m (5 ft 10 in)	Interclube	(Angola)
C	8	Nelma Cunha	15 – 27 February 2002	1.78 m (5 ft 10 in)	C.P.P.L.	(Angola)
SG	9	Alexia Dizeko	16 – 12 March 2001	1.72 m (5 ft 8 in)		(Angola)
PG	10	Cássia António	16 – 6 May 2001	1.62 m (5 ft 4 in)	Interclube	(Angola)
PG	11	Conceição Caetano	15 – 14 October 2001	1.60 m (5 ft 3 in)	Formiguinhas Cazenga	(Angola)
SF	12	Tchéusia Gonçalves	15 – 2 July 2002	1.75 m (5 ft 9 in)	Interclube	(Angola)
C	13	Maria Quipaça	16 – 11 March 2001	1.80 m (5 ft 11 in)	Sporting de Benguela	(Angola)
C	14	Nara André (C)	15 – 11 September 2001	1.77 m (5 ft 10 in)	1º de Agosto	(Angola)
C	15	Júlia Francisco	16 – 25 January 2001	1.79 m (5 ft 10 in)	1º de Agosto	(Angola)

Head coach

- Elisa Pires

Assistant coach(es)

- Irene Guerreiro

Physician

- Margarida João

Physio

- Ndona Pedro

Legend

- (C) Team captain
- nat field describes country

== Players ==
Angola women's u16 and u17 basketball players

A = African championship

#	Name	A	P	H	Club	J.A.	E.P.	A.P.	F.F.	E. Pires	
#	Name	A	P	H	Club	2009	2011	2013	2015	2017	2018
#	Name	A	P	H	Club	3	3	5	3	–	–
⋅	Adriana Manuel	16	F	1.75	(Angola) SBI	⋅	⋅	8	⋅	⋅	⋅
⋅	Alexia Dizeko	16	SG	1.72	(Switzerland) HEL	⋅	⋅	⋅	⋅	9	⋅
⋅	Ana Gonçalves	16	⋅	⋅	(Angola) SBI	10	⋅	⋅	⋅	⋅	⋅
⋅	Analzira Américo	16	⋅	⋅	(Angola) PRI	5	⋅	⋅	⋅	⋅	⋅
⋅	Artemis Barbosa	16	⋅	⋅	(Portugal) ADV	4	⋅	⋅	⋅	⋅	⋅
⋅	Avelina Peso	15	⋅	⋅	(Angola) BLB	⋅	⋅	15	⋅	⋅	⋅
⋅	Breone Caculo	16	⋅	⋅	(Angola) SBG	⋅	⋅	⋅	13	⋅	⋅
⋅	Canata Miguel	16	⋅	⋅	(Angola) BLB	⋅	⋅	⋅	15	⋅	⋅
⋅	Cássia António	16	PG	1.62	(Angola) INT	⋅	⋅	⋅	⋅	10	⋅
⋅	Cláudia Manuel	16	⋅	⋅	⋅	9	⋅	⋅	⋅	⋅	⋅
⋅	Conceição Caetano	16	PG	1.60	(Angola) FOR	⋅	⋅	⋅	⋅	11	⋅
⋅	Cristina Lourenço	16	PG	1.64	(Angola) PRI	⋅	⋅	⋅	⋅	5	⋅
⋅	Denise Pascoal	16	⋅	⋅	(Angola) BLA	⋅	⋅	⋅	6	⋅	⋅
⋅	Eduarda Gabriel	16	⋅	⋅	(Angola) INT	⋅	⋅	12	⋅	⋅	⋅
⋅	Edvânia Pascoal	16	⋅	⋅	(Angola) INT	⋅	⋅	⋅	14	⋅	⋅
⋅	Elizete Elias	15	PG	1.65	(Angola) CPL	⋅	⋅	⋅	⋅	4	⋅
⋅	Elizabeth Mateus	16	⋅	⋅	(Angola) INT	13	⋅	⋅	⋅	⋅	⋅
⋅	Elsa Alberto	15	⋅	⋅	(Angola) INT	⋅	14	⋅	⋅	⋅	⋅
⋅	Emanuela Mateus	16	⋅	⋅	(Angola) INT	⋅	⋅	11	⋅	⋅	⋅
⋅	Emília Macuta	16	⋅	⋅	(Angola) PRI	⋅	7	⋅	⋅	⋅	⋅
⋅	Érica Guilherme	15	⋅	⋅	(Angola) INT	⋅	13	⋅	⋅	⋅	⋅
⋅	Francisca Mateus	16	⋅	⋅	(Angola) INT	⋅	15	⋅	⋅	⋅	⋅
⋅	Geovana Dongua	16	⋅	⋅	(Angola) PRI	⋅	⋅	⋅	8	⋅	⋅
⋅	Helena Francisco	16	⋅	⋅	(Angola) PRI	12	⋅	⋅	⋅	⋅	⋅
⋅	Helena Malange	15	⋅	⋅	(Angola) JUV	⋅	5	⋅	⋅	⋅	⋅
⋅	Helena Pululo	16	C	1.79	(Angola) INT	⋅	⋅	⋅	⋅	7	⋅
⋅	Helena Viegas	16	⋅	⋅	(Angola) JUV	⋅	8	⋅	⋅	⋅	⋅
⋅	Irene Cafumo	16	⋅	⋅	(Angola) PRI	⋅	⋅	⋅	9	⋅	⋅
⋅	Isabel Fernando	15	⋅	⋅	(Angola) BLA	⋅	⋅	⋅	5	⋅	⋅
⋅	Isabel Simba	15	⋅	⋅	(Angola) PRI	⋅	⋅	7	⋅	⋅	⋅
⋅	Isidora Augusto	16	SG	1.66	(Angola) FOR	⋅	⋅	⋅	⋅	6	⋅
⋅	Jaema António	16	⋅	⋅	(Angola) SBG	⋅	⋅	⋅	12	⋅	⋅
⋅	Joana António	16	⋅	⋅	(Angola) INT	⋅	⋅	14	⋅	⋅	⋅
⋅	Joana Bendi	16	⋅	⋅	(Angola) PRI	⋅	12	⋅	⋅	⋅	⋅
⋅	Juda Quindanda	15	⋅	⋅	(Angola) BLB	⋅	⋅	13	⋅	⋅	⋅
⋅	Júlia Francisco	16	C	1.79	(Angola) PRI	⋅	⋅	⋅	⋅	15	⋅
⋅	Lizeth Ndombele	16	⋅	⋅	(Angola) JUV	11	⋅	⋅	⋅	⋅	⋅
⋅	Luisa Domingos	15	⋅	⋅	(Angola) PHU	⋅	4	⋅	⋅	⋅	⋅
⋅	Luisa João	16	⋅	⋅	(Angola) PRI	⋅	⋅	⋅	10	⋅	⋅
⋅	Luyana Filipe	15	⋅	⋅	(Angola) PRI	6	⋅	⋅	⋅	⋅	⋅
⋅	Madalena Silva	15	⋅	⋅	(Angola) IBG	⋅	6	⋅	⋅	⋅	⋅
⋅	Madalena Valentim	16	⋅	⋅	(Angola) JUV	7	⋅	⋅	⋅	⋅	⋅
⋅	Maria Quipaca	16	C	1.80	(Angola) SBG	⋅	⋅	⋅	⋅	13	⋅
⋅	Mariana Manuel	16	⋅	⋅	(Angola) IBG	⋅	⋅	10	⋅	⋅	⋅
⋅	Miriam Cruz	15	C	1.80	(Angola) BLB	⋅	⋅	9	⋅	⋅	⋅
⋅	Nara André	16	C	1.77	(Angola) PRI	⋅	⋅	⋅	⋅	14	⋅
⋅	Nelma Avelino	15	⋅	⋅	(Angola) MAC	⋅	⋅	6	⋅	⋅	⋅
⋅	Nelma Cunha	15	C	1.78	(Angola) CPL	⋅	⋅	⋅	⋅	8	⋅
⋅	Neusa Cândido	15	⋅	⋅	⋅	⋅	⋅	4	⋅	⋅	⋅
⋅	Regina Pequeno	16	⋅	⋅	(Angola) IBG	⋅	⋅	⋅	11	⋅	⋅
⋅	Rosa Bouandzi	16	⋅	⋅	(Angola) MAC	14	⋅	⋅	⋅	⋅	⋅
⋅	Rosa Gala	16	⋅	⋅	(Angola) BLB	⋅	10	⋅	⋅	⋅	⋅
⋅	Rosemira Daniel	16	⋅	⋅	(Angola) MAC	8	⋅	⋅	⋅	⋅	⋅
⋅	Sênia Cazua	16	⋅	⋅	(Angola) INT	⋅	11	⋅	⋅	⋅	⋅
⋅	Tchéusia Gonçalves	15	SF	1.75	(Angola) INT	⋅	⋅	⋅	⋅	12	⋅
⋅	Teresa Sacato	15	G	1.68	(Angola) BLB	⋅	⋅	5	⋅	⋅	⋅
⋅	Valéria Nascimento	16	⋅	⋅	(Angola) PRI	⋅	⋅	⋅	4	⋅	⋅
⋅	Valeriana Moxi	16	⋅	⋅	(Angola) INT	⋅	⋅	⋅	7	⋅	⋅
⋅	Vânia Vicente	16	⋅	⋅	(Angola) INT	⋅	9	⋅	⋅	⋅	⋅
⋅	Victória Cruz	15	⋅	⋅	⋅	15	⋅	⋅	⋅	⋅	⋅

== Manager history ==
- Elisa Pires 2017
- Fernando Figueiredo 2015
- Apolinário Paquete 2013
- Elisa Pires 2011
- João António 2009

== See also ==
- Angola women's national basketball team
- Angola women's national under-20 basketball team
- Angola women's national under-18 and under-19 basketball team
- Angola men's national under-16 and under-17 basketball team
