= Onome Akinbode-James =

Nigerian basketball player

Personal information
- Born: March 9, 2000 (age 26) Abeokuta, Nigeria
- Listed height: 6 ft 3 in (1.91 m)

Career information
- High school: Blair Academy
- College: Duke (2018–2022)
- Position: Forward/center
- Number: 24

Onome Mary Akinbode-James (born 9 March 2000) is a Nigerian former collegiate basketball player, software engineer, and youth-development advocate. She played college basketball for the Duke Blue Devils women's basketball team from 2018 to 2022 and represented Nigeria at the youth international level.

Born and raised in Abeokuta, Ogun State, Nigeria, Akinbode-James began playing basketball as a teenager and represented Nigeria at the 2015 FIBA Africa Under-16 Championship for Women. Following the tournament, she moved to the United States and attended Blair Academy, where she became a two-time All-Mid-Atlantic Prep League selection and helped lead the school to conference and state championships.

A four-star recruit in the Class of 2018, Akinbode-James committed to Duke University, where she appeared in 94 games across four seasons and earned recognition for both her defensive contributions and academic achievements. She graduated from Duke with degrees in Electrical and Computer Engineering and Computer Science and later pursued a career in technology while remaining involved in basketball development, leadership initiatives, and mentorship programs for African student-athletes.

== Early life ==
Akinbode-James was raised in Abeokuta, Ogun State, Nigeria, where she completed her primary and early secondary education.

She began playing organized basketball at the age of 13 while attending secondary school. Despite her relatively late introduction to the sport, she quickly emerged as one of Nigeria's top youth prospects and earned selection to the country's under-16 national team.

In 2015, she represented Nigeria at the 2015 FIBA Africa Under-16 Championship for Women, where the team won a silver medal and qualified for the FIBA Under-17 Women's Basketball World Cup.

== High school career ==
Following the FIBA Africa Under-16 Championship, Akinbode-James relocated to the United States and enrolled at Blair Academy in Blairstown, New Jersey.

During her senior season, she averaged 13.0 points, 11.8 rebounds, and 2.2 blocks per game.

Akinbode-James was named a two-time All-Mid-Atlantic Prep League (MAPL) First Team selection and helped establish Blair Academy as one of the region's leading girls' basketball programs.

During her senior year, Akinbode-James delivered a TEDxBlairAcademy talk titled Africa - Country or Continent?: The Broken Perception, discussing common misconceptions about Africa and reflecting on her experiences growing up in Nigeria before relocating to the United States.

=== Recruiting ===
ESPN rated her as a four-star recruit and ranked her the No. 12 post player nationally in her class.

Her recruitment followed a rapid rise from youth basketball in Nigeria to international competition and prep-school success in the United States. She received interest from several NCAA Division I programs before signing with Duke University on 11 April 2018 to play for head coach Joanne P. McCallie.

== College career ==
=== Recruiting and arrival at Duke ===
Akinbode-James committed to Duke University as a member of the Class of 2018 after a successful career at Blair Academy. Rated as a four-star recruit by ESPN, she was ranked the No. 12 post player nationally in her recruiting class.

She signed with the Duke Blue Devils women's basketball program under head coach Joanne P. McCallie.

=== Freshman season (2018–19) ===
Akinbode-James appeared in 30 games during her freshman season and averaged 4.0 points, 5.4 rebounds, and 1.4 blocks per game.

She established herself as one of Duke's top interior defenders, recording 42 blocked shots, the fourth-highest total by a freshman in program history. Her 63 offensive rebounds ranked among the top freshman marks in Duke women's basketball history.

Duke finished the season 28–8 and advanced to the Elite Eight of the NCAA Division I women's basketball tournament.

=== Sophomore season (2019–20) ===
As a sophomore, Akinbode-James became a regular starter, starting 27 of Duke's 30 games. She averaged 4.6 points, 5.0 rebounds, and 1.1 blocks per game while serving as one of the team's primary defensive anchors.

=== Junior season (2020–21) ===
The 2020–21 season was shortened after Duke suspended competition because of the COVID-19 pandemic. Akinbode-James started all four games played by the Blue Devils and averaged career highs of 7.5 points and 11.5 rebounds per game.

=== Senior season (2021–22) ===
Akinbode-James appeared in all 30 games and made 19 starts during her senior season. She averaged 4.3 points, 5.0 rebounds, and 1.0 block per game while helping Duke return to postseason competition under head coach Kara Lawson.

=== Academic achievements ===
While competing for Duke, Akinbode-James pursued degrees in Electrical and Computer Engineering and Computer science. She earned recognition for her academic achievements as a student-athlete, including selection to the All-ACC Academic Team and multiple appearances on the ACC Academic Honor Roll.

Akinbode-James became the first Duke women's basketball player in at least 25 years of program records to graduate with a double major in engineering and computer science while serving as a regular starter for the program.

=== Career statistics ===
Over four seasons at Duke, Akinbode-James appeared in 94 games, including 52 starts. She averaged 4.4 points, 5.4 rebounds, and 1.1 blocks per game while shooting 45.9 percent from the field.

== National team career ==
Akinbode-James represented Nigeria at the 2015 FIBA Africa Under-16 Championship for Women. During the tournament, she averaged 5.7 points, 10.3 rebounds, and 0.8 assists per game.

Nigeria advanced to the championship game, where it was defeated 57–46 by Mali to finish as runners-up and earn the silver medal.

The team's runner-up finish qualified Nigeria for the FIBA Under-17 Women's Basketball World Cup, although Nigeria ultimately did not participate in the tournament.

In 2024, Akinbode-James was invited to participate in preparations for the Nigerian women's national basketball team ahead of the 2024 Summer Olympics. However, she was unable to participate because of injury.

=== International statistics ===
Tournament	GP	PPG	RPG	APG
2015 FIBA Africa U16 Championship	6	5.7	10.3	0.8

== Professional and leadership career ==
Following her graduation from Duke University, Akinbode-James entered the technology industry as a software engineer.

Akinbode-James founded the Ready Leaders Foundation, a nonprofit organization focused on leadership development, education, civic engagement, and youth empowerment initiatives in Nigeria.

In 2025, through the Ready Leaders Foundation, she organized a three-day female basketball development camp in Abeokuta, Ogun State. The camp brought together approximately 60 athletes and 15 coaches and combined basketball instruction with mentorship and leadership development programming.

Akinbode-James also founded African Athlete Abroad, a platform that provides guidance and resources for African student-athletes pursuing educational and athletic opportunities internationally.

Much of Akinbode-James's leadership work focuses on supporting young athletes navigating educational opportunities abroad, promoting youth leadership development, and increasing access to basketball and mentorship opportunities for girls and young women in Nigeria.
