= 2018–19 Duke Blue Devils women's basketball team =

Intercollegiate basketball season

2018–19 Duke Blue Devils women's basketball
- Conference: Atlantic Coast Conference
- Record: 15–15 (6–10 ACC)
- Head coach: Joanne P. McCallie (12th season)
- Assistant coaches: Hernando Planells; Rene Haynes; Sam Miller
- Home arena: Cameron Indoor Stadium

2018–19 ACC women's basketball standings
	Conf.				Overall
Team	W		L	PCT	W		L	PCT
No. 3 Notre Dame†	14	–	2	.875	35	–	4	.897
No. 5 Louisville	14	–	2	.875	32	–	4	.889
No. 10 NC State	12	–	4	.750	28	–	6	.824
No. 19 Miami (FL)	12	–	4	.750	25	–	9	.735
No. 12 Syracuse	11	–	5	.688	25	–	9	.735
No. 25 Florida State	10	–	6	.625	24	–	9	.727
Clemson	9	–	7	.563	20	–	13	.606
North Carolina	8	–	8	.500	18	–	15	.545
Georgia Tech	7	–	9	.438	17	–	13	.567
Virginia Tech	6	–	10	.375	22	–	12	.647
Duke	6	–	10	.375	15	–	15	.500
Virginia	5	–	11	.313	12	–	19	.387
Boston College	3	–	13	.188	14	–	16	.467
Pittsburgh	2	–	14	.125	11	–	20	.355
Wake Forest	1	–	15	.063	10	–	20	.333
† 2019 ACC tournament winner As of March 7, 2019; Rankings from AP poll

The 2018–19 Duke Blue Devils women's basketball team represented Duke University during the 2018–19 NCAA Division I women's basketball season. Returning as head coach was Joanne P. McCallie, entering her 12th season. The team played its home games at Cameron Indoor Stadium in Durham, North Carolina as members of the Atlantic Coast Conference. They finished the season 15–15, 6–10 in ACC play to finish in a tie for tenth place. They advanced to the second round of the ACC women's tournament, where they lost to Florida State.

== Previous season ==
The 2017-18 Blue Devils finished the season 24–9, 11–5 in ACC play to finish tied for fourth place in the regular season. They were the fourth seed in the ACC women's tournament, where they lost their first game to NC State. They received an at-large bid to the 2018 NCAA Division I women's basketball tournament, and were seeded fifth in the Albany region. They beat Belmont and Georgia before losing to Connecticut in the Sweet 16.

== Off-season ==
=== Recruiting class ===
College recruiting
Name	Hometown	School	Height	Weight	Commit date
Onome Akinbode-James; F	Blairstown, NJ	Blair Academy	6 ft 3 in (1.91 m)	N/A	
Onome Akinbode-James; F	Recruit ratings: ESPN: (94)				
Rayah Craig; PG	Scottsdale, AZ	Desert Mountain	5 ft 8 in (1.73 m)	N/A	
Rayah Craig; PG	Recruit ratings: ESPN: (94)				
Uchenna Nwoke; P	Grand Prairie, TX	South Grand Prairie High School	6 ft 4 in (1.93 m)	N/A	
Uchenna Nwoke; P	Recruit ratings: ESPN: (90)				
Overall recruit ranking:
Note: In many cases, Scout, Rivals, 247Sports, On3, and ESPN may conflict in their listings of height and weight.; In these cases, the average was taken. ESPN grades are on a 100-point scale.; Sources:

== Roster ==
2018–19 Duke Blue Devils women's basketball team
Players
Coaches

Pos.	#	Name	Height	Year	Previous school	Hometown
G	2	Haley Gorecki	6 ft 0 in (1.83 m)	RS Jr	William Fremd	Palatine, IL
G	3	Miela Goodchild	5 ft 10 in (1.78 m)	Fr	Moreton Bay College	Queensland, Australia
F	5	Leaonna Odom	6 ft 2 in (1.88 m)	Jr	Chaminade	Lompoc, CA
C	11	Sofía Roma	6 ft 2 in (1.88 m)	RS Sr	Nazareth Regional; Wagner	Richmond Hill, NY
G	12	Mikayla Boykin	5 ft 9 in (1.75 m)	RS Fr	Clinton	Clinton, NC
C	13	Uchenna Nwoke	6 ft 6 in (1.98 m)	Fr	South Grand Prairie High School	Grand Prairie, TX
G/F	14	Faith Suggs	6 ft 1 in (1.85 m)	Sr	Homewood Flossmoor	Flossmoor, IL
G	15	Kyra Lambert	5 ft 9 in (1.75 m)	RS Jr	Samuel Clemens	Cibolo, TX
G	23	Rayah Criag	5 ft 10 in (1.78 m)	Fr	Desert Mountain	Scottsdale, AZ
F/C	24	Onome Akinbode-James	6 ft 3 in (1.91 m)	Fr	Blair Academy	Blairstown, NJ
F/C	25	Jade Williams	6 ft 5 in (1.96 m)	So	Owensboro Catholic	Owensboro, KY
C	30	Emily Schubert	6 ft 4 in (1.93 m)	RS So	Elizabethton	Elizabethton, TN
G	32	Jayda Adams	6 ft 4 in (1.93 m)	So	Mater Dei	Irvine, CA
F	44	Madison Treece	6 ft 4 in (1.93 m)	So	Rock Bridge	St. Peters, MO

Head coach

- Joanne P. McCallie (Northwestern)

Assistant coach(es)

- Hernando Planells (Regis)
- Rene Haynes (Michigan State)
- Sam Miller (Adrian)

Legend

- (C) Team captain
- (S) Suspended
- (I) Ineligible
- (W) Walk-on
- Injured
- Current redshirt

Roster
Last update: October 5, 2018

== Rankings ==
2018–19 NCAA Division I women's basketball rankings

Regular season polls
Poll	Pre- season	Week 2	Week 3	Week 4	Week 5	Week 6	Week 7	Week 8	Week 9	Week 10	Week 11	Week 12	Week 13	Week 14	Week 15	Week 16	Week 17	Week 18	Week 19	Final
AP	21	RV	RV																	N/A
Coaches	20	20^	RV	RV																

Legend
	Increase in ranking
	Decrease in ranking
	No change
(RV)	Received votes
(NR)	Not ranked

^Coaches did not release a Week 2 poll.

== Schedule ==
Date time, TV	Rank^{#}	Opponent^{#}	Result	Record	High points	High rebounds	High assists	Site (attendance) city, state
Exhibition
November 4, 2018*; 2:00 pm	No. 21	Alaska Anchorage	W 75–57	0–0	18 – Gorecki	11 – Akinbode-Jame	6 – Odom	Cameron Indoor Stadium; Durham, NC
Non-conference regular season
November 11, 2018*; 2:00 pm, BTN	No. 21	at Northwestern	L 51–84	0–1	14 – Odom	14 – Odom	3 – Gorecki	Welsh–Ryan Arena (2,258); Evanston, IL
November 15, 2018*; 7:00 pm		at Maine	W 66–63	1–1	21 – Gorecki	6 – Gorecki	10 – Gorecki	Cross Insurance Center (2,868); Bangor, ME
November 18, 2018*; 2:00 pm, ACCN Extra		Elon	W 81–64	2–1	23 – Odom	10 – Odom	4 – Adams	Cameron Indoor Stadium (3,313); Durham, NC
November 23, 2018*; 1:30 pm		vs. Washington; Gulf Coast Showcase Quarterfinals	L 64–71	2–2	20 – Gorecki	10 – Odom	5 – Gorecki	Hertz Arena (458); Estero, FL
November 24, 2018*; 11:00 am		vs. Ball State; Gulf Coast Showcase Consolation 2nd round	W 79–62	3–2	19 – Gorecki	9 – Odom	6 – Odom	Hertz Arena (516); Estero, FL
November 25, 2018*; 1:30 pm		vs. No. 21 Missouri; Gulf Coast Showcase 5th place game	L 64–72	3–3	24 – Gorecki	11 – Akinbode-James	2 – 2 tied	Hertz Arena (762); Estero, FL
November 28, 2018*; 9:00 pm, BTN		at Wisconsin; ACC–Big Ten Women's Challenge	W 60–53	4–3	14 – 2 Tied	14 – Akinbode-James	4 – Goodchild	Kohl Center (3,483); Madison, WI
December 2, 2018*; 2:00 pm, ACCN Extra		Marist	W 64–56	5–3	20 – Odom	11 – Odom	5 – Gorecki	Cameron Indoor Stadium (2,923); Durham, NC
December 6, 2018*; 7:00 pm, ACCN Extra		UNLV	W 66–38	6–3	14 – Goodchild	7 – Akinbode-James	6 – Boykin	Cameron Indoor Stadium (3,018); Durham, NC
December 9, 2018*; 2:00 pm, ACCN Extra		No. 22 South Carolina; Cancelled; inclement weather						Cameron Indoor Stadium; Durham, NC
December 20, 2018*; 10:00 pm, P12N		at No. 11 Oregon State	L 57–71	6–4	18 – Gorecki	11 – Gorecki	3 – Gorecki	Gill Coliseum (7,060); Corvallis, OR
December 28, 2018*; 7:00 pm, ACCN Extra		East Carolina	W 83–66	7–4	26 – Gorecki	11 – Gorecki	3 – 2 tied	Cameron Indoor Stadium (3,512); Durham, NC
December 30, 2018*; 2:00 pm, ACCN Extra		Florida Gulf Coast	W 57–41	8–4	17 – Williams	11 – Williams	7 – Boykin	Cameron Indoor Stadium (3,310); Durham, NC
ACC regular season
January 3, 2019; 7:00 pm, RSN		at No. 9 NC State	L 51–63	8–5 (0–1)	19 – Gorecki	8 – Odom	2 – 2 tied	Reynolds Coliseum (2,971); Raleigh, NC
January 6, 2018; 2:00 pm, ACCN Extra		No. 3 Louisville	L 51–73	8–6 (0–2)	16 – Odom	7 – Odom	5 – Boykin	Cameron Indoor Stadium (4,228); Durham, NC
January 10, 2018; 7:00 pm, ACCN Extra		at Georgia Tech	L 64–70	8–7 (0–3)	22 – Gorecki	9 – Gorecki	11 – Boykin	McCamish Pavilion (1,485); Atlanta, GA
January 17, 2019; 7:00 pm, ACCN Extra		Miami (FL)	L 50–58	8–8 (0–4)	13 – Goodchild	9 – Gorecki	5 – Gorecki	Cameron Indoor Stadium (3,664); Durham, NC
January 20, 2018; 2:00 pm, ACCN Extra		at Florida State	L 62–66	8–9 (0–5)	25 – Gorecki	7 – Odom	6 – Gorecki	Tucker Center (3,636); Tallahassee, FL
January 24, 2019; 7:00 pm, ACCN Extra		Wake Forest	W 66–52	9–9 (1–5)	20 – Odom	5 – Goodchild	6 – Gorecki	Cameron Indoor Stadium (3,202); Durham, NC
January 27, 2019; 1:00 pm, RSN		No. 13 Syracuse	L 55–64	9–10 (1–6)	26 – Gorecki	10 – Gorecki	4 – Gorecki	Cameron Indoor Stadium (4,004); Durham, NC
January 31, 2019; 7:00 pm, ACCN Extra		at Boston College	L 90–92 ^{2OT}	9–11 (1–7)	24 – Gorecki	14 – Gorecki	9 – Odom	Conte Forum (925); Chestnut Hill, MA
February 3, 2019; 2:00 pm, ACCN Extra		Pittsburgh	W 74–55	10–11 (2–7)	16 – Gorecki	10 – Gorecki	10 – Gorecki	Cameron Indoor Stadium (3,722); Durham, NC
February 7, 2019; 7:00 pm, ACCN Extra		at North Carolina; Rivalry	W 85–69	11–11 (3–7)	28 – Gorecki	10 – Gorecki	6 – Williams	Carmichael Arena (3,123); Chapel Hill, NC
February 10, 2019; 2:00 pm, ACCN Extra		at Virginia	L 47–53	11–12 (3–8)	13 – Tied	6 – Tied	6 – Gorecki	John Paul Jones Arena (3,536); Charlottesville, VA
February 14, 2019; 7:00 pm, RSN		Virginia Tech	L 57–64	11–13 (3–9)	26 – Gorecki	8 – Gorecki	5 – Odom	Cameron Indoor Stadium (3,117); Durham, NC
February 21, 2019; 7:00 pm, ACCN Extra		at No. 5 Notre Dame	L 61–89	11–14 (3–10)	26 – Goodchild	7 – Odom	5 – Gorecki	Joyce Center (8,399); Notre Dame, IN
February 24, 2019; 1:00 pm, ACCN Extra		at Wake Forest	W 55–44	12–14 (4–10)	17 – Williams	9 – Akinbode-James	4 – Gorecki	LJVM Coliseum (2,037); Winston-Salem, NC
February 28, 2019; 7:00 pm, ACCN Extra		Clemson	W 63–59	13–14 (5–10)	21 – Gorecki	14 – Akinbode-James	5 – Odom	Cameron Indoor Stadium (3,149); Durham, NC
March 3, 2019; 12:00 pm, ESPN2		North Carolina; Rivalry	W 62–44	14–14 (6–10)	22 – Odom	13 – Williams	4 – Odom	Cameron Indoor Stadium (9,314); Durham, NC
ACC Women's Tournament
March 6, 2019; 6:30 pm, RSN	(11)	vs. (14) Pittsburgh; First Round	W 86–64	15–14	19 – Goodchild	7 – 3 tied	8 – Odom	Greensboro Coliseum (3,233); Greensboro, NC
March 7, 2019; 8:00 pm, RSN	(11)	vs. (6) No. 22 Florida State; Second Round	L 41–51	15–15	17 – Gorecki	6 – Odom	3 – Gorecki	Greensboro Coliseum (4,024); Greensboro, NC
*Non-conference game. ^{#}Rankings from AP Poll,. (#) Tournament seedings in parentheses. All times are in Eastern Time.

== See also ==
- 2018–19 Duke Blue Devils men's basketball team
