= Tanzania women's national under-16 basketball team =

Tanzania
- FIBA zone: FIBA Africa
- National federation: Basketball Association of Tanzania

U17 World Cup
- Appearances: None

U16 AfroBasket
- Appearances: 2
- Medals: None

The Tanzania women's national under-16 basketball team is a national basketball team of Tanzania, administered by the Basketball Association of Tanzania. It represents the country in international under-16 women's basketball competitions.

== FIBA U16 Women's AfroBasket participations ==
Year	Result
2019	7th
2025	7th

== See also ==
- Tanzania women's national basketball team
- Tanzania men's national basketball team
