= 2015 FIBA Africa Under-16 Championship for Women =

2015 FIBA U16 Women's AfroBasket
4th FIBA Under-16 Women's African Basketball Championship

Tournament details
- Host country: Madagascar
- Dates: July 11–19
- Teams: 9 (from 53 federations)
- Venue: 1 (in 1 host city)

Final positions
- Champions: Mali (4th title)

Tournament statistics
- MVP: (Mali) Rokia Doumbia
- Top scorer: (Angola) Regina 15.6
- Top rebounds: (Rwanda) Murekatete 22
- Top assists: (Madagascar) Lahatra 3.7
- PPG (Team): Mali 81.9
- RPG (Team): Mali 58.6
- APG (Team): Mali 12.7

Official website
- 2015 FIBA Africa U-16 Championship for Women

The 2015 FIBA Africa Under-16 Championship for Women was the 4th FIBA Africa U16 Championship for Women, played under the rules of FIBA, the world governing body for basketball, and the FIBA Africa thereof. The tournament was hosted by Madagascar from July 11 to 19, with the games played at the Palais des Sports Mahamasina in Antananarivo.

Mali defeated Nigeria – in the final to win their fourth title in a row. and securing a spot at the 2016 U-17 World Cup.

== Draw ==
Group A	Group B
Egypt; Madagascar; Morocco; Nigeria	Angola; Mali; Mozambique; Rwanda; Tunisia

== Preliminary round ==
Times given below are in UTC+3.

=== Group A ===
Qualified for the quarter-finals

Team	Pts.	W	L	PF	PA	Diff
Nigeria	6	3	0	156	131	+21
Madagascar	5	2	1	184	130	+31
Egypt	4	1	2	179	161	+18
Morocco	3	0	3	92	166	-74

11 Jul 2015
14:00

Boxscore

Nigeria	54–52	Egypt
Scoring by quarter: 9-20, 11-6, 23-16, 11-10
Pts: James 19; Rebs: Adams 13; Asts: three players 2		Pts: Mahinour 11; Rebs: Shash 9 Asts: F.Mohamed 3

Palais des Sports, Antananarivo
Referees: Artur de Castro (MOZ), David Manuel (ANG), Didier Gaga (RWA)

17:00

Boxscore

Madagascar	62–29	Morocco
Scoring by quarter: 17-6, 14-6, 11-9, 20-8
Pts: Jaofera 14; Rebs: Lalaina 12; Asts: Vavisoa 4		Pts: Mouharrar 10; Rebs: Rihane 8 Asts: five players 1

Palais des Sports, Antananarivo
Referees: Fikadu Gebeto (ETH), Sassi Camara (MLI), Aymen Chakroun (TUN)

12 July 2015
17:00

Boxscore

Nigeria	60–53	Madagascar
Scoring by quarter: 13-8, 15-15, 12-20, 20-10
Pts: Ibeh 17; Rebs: Ibeh, James 10; Asts: four players 1		Pts: Totofidy 15; Rebs: Vavisoa 13; Asts: Lahatra 4

Palais des Sports, Antananarivo
Referees: Artur de Castro (MOZ), David Manuel (ANG), Didier Gaga (RWA)

15 Jul 2015
15:00

Boxscore

Morocco	37–62	Egypt
Scoring by quarter: 5-15, 9-16, 12-8, 11-23
Pts: Makhoukhi 17; Rebs: Makhoukhi, Ziali 10; Asts: three players 2		Pts: Mahinour 14; Rebs: Ibraheem, Mostafa 7 Asts: R.Mohamed 4

Palais des Sports, Antananarivo
Referees: Artur de Castro (MOZ), Ambrose Mbalu (KEN), Sassi Camara (MLI)

14 July 2015
13:00

Boxscore

Morocco	26–42	Nigeria
Scoring by quarter: 2-9, 2-3, 5-15, 17-15
Pts: Mouharrar 14; Rebs: Ziali 9 Asts: Salimi, El Azri 2		Pts: James 11; Rebs: Adams 12; Asts: Ibeh 3

Palais des Sports, Antananarivo
Referees: Bennon Soobiah (MRI), David Manuel (ANG), Sassi Camara (MLI)

17:00

Boxscore

Egypt	65–70	Madagascar
Scoring by quarter: 22-17, 13-15, 13-20, 17-18
Pts: Khalaf 15; Rebs: Khalaf 9 Asts: Mostafa, F.Mohamed 3		Pts: Jaofera 17; Rebs: Vavisoa 12; Asts: Jaofera 6

Palais des Sports, Antananarivo
Referees: Artur de Castro (MOZ), Aymen Chakroun (TUN), Didier Gaga (RWA)

=== Group B ===
Qualified for the quarter-finals

Team	Pts.	W	L	PF	PA	Diff
Mali	6	4	0	357	172	+185
Mozambique	5	3	1	274	217	+57
Angola	4	2	2	251	251	0
Tunisia	3	1	3	246	262	-18
Rwanda	3	0	4	92	281	-189

11 July 2015
12:00

Boxscore

Tunisia	57–68	Angola
Scoring by quarter: 11-18, 22-20, 11-13, 13-17
Pts: Shili 19; Rebs: Hamrouni 13; Asts: three players 2		Pts: Regina 21; Rebs: Canata 25; Asts: Regina 2

Palais des Sports, Antananarivo
Referees: Bennon Soobiah (MRI), Waleed Elmoshrfy (EGY), Josianie Rajonirina (MAD)

19:00

Boxscore

Mali	77–50	Mozambique
Scoring by quarter: 21-18, 17-11, 17-5, 22-16
Pts: Doumbia, Sangare 18; Rebs: Sidibe 11; Asts: Doumbia 3		Pts: Chanaya 14; Rebs: Carla 10; Asts: Chanaya 2

Palais des Sports, Antananarivo
Referees: Olayinka Famogbiyele (NGR), Omar Kettani (MAR), Ambrose Mbalu (KEN)

12 July 2015
15:00

Boxscore

Tunisia	53–81	Mali
Scoring by quarter: 11-13, 13-23, 12-24, 17-21
Pts: Shili 20; Rebs: Hamrouni 11; Asts: Ben Gara 3		Pts: Kourouma 16; Rebs: Sidibe 13; Asts: Doumbia, Diabate 2

Palais des Sports, Antananarivo
Referees: Fikadu Gebeto (ETH), Ambrose Mbalu (KEN), Omar Kettani (MAR)

19:00

Boxscore

Rwanda	22–96	Mozambique
Scoring by quarter: 5-21, 4-16, 4-32, 9-27
Pts: Murekatete 10; Rebs: Murekatete 20; Asts: three players 1		Pts: Chanaya 23; Rebs: Nelma 13; Asts: Shelsea 5

Palais des Sports, Antananarivo
Referees: Bennon Soobiah (MRI), Josianie Rajonirina (MAD), Waleed Elmoshrfy (EGY)

13 July 2015
15:00

Boxscore

Rwanda	47–74	Tunisia
Scoring by quarter: 14-14, 8-15, 10-17, 15-28
Pts: Murekatete 24; Rebs: Murekatete 37; Asts: Utamuriza 3		Pts: Shili 21; Rebs: Ben Gara 13; Asts: Shili 8

Palais des Sports, Antananarivo
Referees: Ambrose Mbalu (KEN), Sassi Camara (MLI), Olayinka Famogbiyele (NGR)

17:00

Boxscore

Angola	46–88	Mali
Scoring by quarter: 11-26, 7-19, 11-19, 17-24
Pts: Isabel 10; Rebs: Regina 8 Asts: Breone 2		Pts: Doumbia 21; Rebs: Sidibe 14; Asts: Traore 7

Palais des Sports, Antananarivo
Referees: Fikadu Gebeto (ETH), Bennon Soobiah (MRI), Aymen Chakroun (TUN)

14 July 2015
15:00

Boxscore

Angola	81–44	Rwanda
Scoring by quarter: 17-10, 18-12, 21-10, 25-12
Pts: Valeriana 18; Rebs: Denise 10; Asts: Valeriana, Edvânia 3		Pts: Murekatete 12; Rebs: Murekatete 14; Asts: Twisungimana 4

Palais des Sports, Antananarivo
Referees: Waleed Elmoshrfy (EGY), Omar Kettani (MAR), Josianie Rajonirina (MAD)

19:00

Boxscore

Mozambique	66–62	Tunisia
Scoring by quarter: 16-12, 19-14, 17-18, 14-18
Pts: Chanaya 24; Rebs: Chanaya 12; Asts: Chanaya 4		Pts: Chabbouh 19; Rebs: Hamrouni 11; Asts: Hamrouni, Shili 2

Palais des Sports, Antananarivo
Referees: Olayinka Famogbiyele (NGR), Fikadu Gebeto (ETH), Ambrose Mbalu (KEN)

15 July 2015
13:00

Boxscore

Mali	111–23	Rwanda
Scoring by quarter: 22-5, 38-0, 30-10, 21-8
Pts: Bagayoko 20; Rebs: Drame 11; Asts: Sidibe 5		Pts: Murekatete 11; Rebs: Murekatete 17; Asts: six players 1

Palais des Sports, Antananarivo
Referees: Omar Kettani (MAR), Josianie Rajonirina (MAD), Olayinka Famogbiyele (NGR)

17:00

Boxscore

Mozambique	62–56	Angola
Scoring by quarter: 19-13, 17-10, 12-19, 14-14
Pts: Madina 17; Rebs: Chanaya 13; Asts: Chanaya 4		Pts: Regina 22; Rebs: Denise 9 Asts: Edvânia 2

Palais des Sports, Antananarivo
Referees: Fikadu Gebeto (ETH), Bennon Soobiah (MRI), Waleed Elmoshrfy (EGY)

== Knockout stage ==
All matches were played at the: Palais des Sports Mahamasina, Antananarivo

Quarter-finals
17 July 2015 - 13:00
Tunisia	44
Nigeria	55
17 July 2015 - 15:00
Egypt	46
Mozambique	48
17 July 2015 - 17:00
Angola	79
Madagascar	57
17 July 2015 - 19:00
Morocco	24
Mali	73

Semi-finals
18 July 2015 - 17:00
Nigeria	54
Mozambique	51
18 July 2015 - 19:00
Mali	86
Angola	46

Final
19 July 2015 - 18:00
Nigeria	46
Mali	57
Third place
19 July 2015 - 16:00
Mozambique	48
Angola	52

5th place bracket

Semi-finals
18 July 2015 - 13:00
Tunisia	63
Egypt	57
18 July 2015 - 15:00
Morocco	46
Madagascar	58

Fifth place
19 July 2015 - 14:00
Tunisia	57
Madagascar	64
Seventh place
19 July 2015 - 12:00
Egypt	61
Morocco	46

=== Quarter finals ===
17 July 2015
13:00

Boxscore

Tunisia	44–55	Nigeria
Scoring by quarter: 8-13, 14-4, 10-17, 12-21
Pts: Shili 14; Rebs: Ben Gara 8 Asts: Ben Gara, Hamrouni 2		Pts: James 21; Rebs: Adams 20; Asts: James 3

Palais des Sports, Antananarivo
Referees: David Manuel (ANG), Omar Kettani (MAR), Josianie Rajonirina (MAD)

15:00

Boxscore

Egypt	46–48	Mozambique
Scoring by quarter: 11-13, 8-14, 8-13, 19-8
Pts: Elbarky 16; Rebs: F.Mohamed, Mahinour 7 Asts: five players 1		Pts: Chanaya 17; Rebs: Chanaya 15; Asts: Chanaya, Ester 2

Palais des Sports, Antananarivo
Referees: Fikadu Gebeto (ETH), Ambrose Mbalu (KEN), Sassi Camara (MLI)

17:00

Boxscore

Angola	79–57	Madagascar
Scoring by quarter: 17-13, 21-9, 22-24, 19-11
Pts: Isabel 18; Rebs: Denise 17; Asts: Regina, Valeriana 2		Pts: Domoina 10; Rebs: Jessica 13; Asts: Jaofera 5

Palais des Sports, Antananarivo
Referees: Bennon Soobiah (MRI), Waleed Elmoshrfy (EGY), Aymen Chakroun (TUN)

19:00

Boxscore

Morocco	24–73	Mali
Scoring by quarter: 6-15, 7-12, 7-26, 4-20
Pts: Salimi 6 Rebs: Slihi 9 Asts: Mouharrar 2		Pts: Doumbia 17; Rebs: Kourouma 11; Asts: Doumbia 4

Palais des Sports, Antananarivo
Referees: Didier Gaga (RWA), Artur de Castro (MOZ), Olayinka Famogbiyele (NGR)

=== 5-8th classification ===
18 July 2015
13:00

Boxscore

Tunisia	63–57	Egypt
Scoring by quarter: 16-15, 13-16, 20-12, 14-14
Pts: Helali 26; Rebs: Hamrouni 15; Asts: Hamrouni, Shili 3		Pts: Khalaf 20; Rebs: Khalaf 11; Asts: five players 2

Palais des Sports, Antananarivo
Referees: Sassi Camara (MLI), David Manuel (ANG), Didier Gaga (RWA)

15:00

Boxscore

Morocco	46–58	Madagascar
Scoring by quarter: 10-15, 12-19, 14-9, 10-15
Pts: Mouharrar 14; Rebs: Ziali 11; Asts: Mouharrar 2		Pts: Elinah 15; Rebs: Elinah 11; Asts: Rojohasina 6

Palais des Sports, Antananarivo
Referees: Fikadu Gebeto (ETH), Artur de Castro (MOZ), Olayinka Famogbiyele (NGR)

=== Semifinals ===
18 July 2015
17:00

Boxscore

Nigeria	54–51	Mozambique
Scoring by quarter: 5-16, 20-8, 11-11, 18-16
Pts: Ibeh 16; Rebs: Adams 14; Asts: James 2		Pts: Carla 12; Rebs: Carla 19; Asts: Chanaya 3

Palais des Sports, Antananarivo
Referees: Bennon Soobiah (MRI), Aymen Chakroun (TUN), Omar Kettani (MAR)

19:00

Boxscore

Mali	86–46	Angola
Scoring by quarter: 19-13, 20-12, 22-7, 25-14
Pts: Kourouma 22; Rebs: Kourouma 14; Asts: Doumbia 6		Pts: Denise 9 Rebs: Regina 7 Asts: Isabel 2

Palais des Sports, Antananarivo
Referees: Buyiswa Tshemese (RSA), Waleed Elmoshrfy (EGY), Josianie Rajonirina (MAD)

=== 7th place match ===
19 July 2015
12:00

Boxscore

Egypt	61–46	Morocco
Scoring by quarter: 11-7, 18-14, 21-11, 11-14
Pts: Sedky, R.Mohamed 17; Rebs: Mostafa 9 Asts: Mostafa 5		Pts: N.Khessassi 18; Rebs: N.Khessassi 6 Asts: Mouharrar, Kada 3

Palais des Sports, Antananarivo
Referees: Josianie Rajonirina (MAD), Aymen Chakroun (TUN), Olayinka Famogbiyele (NGR)

=== 5th place match ===
19 July 2015
14:00

Boxscore

Tunisia	57–64	Madagascar
Scoring by quarter: 8-11, 17-14, 10-21, 22-18
Pts: Shili 14; Rebs: Shili 9 Asts: Shili 3		Pts: Jaofera 21; Rebs: Vavisoa 40; Asts: Lahatra, Elinah 4

Palais des Sports, Antananarivo
Referees: Sassi Camara (MLI), Ambrose Mbalu (KEN), Didier Gaga (RWA)

=== Bronze medal match ===
19 July 2015
16:00

Boxscore

Mozambique	48–52	Angola
Scoring by quarter: 17-11, 8-13, 6-11, 17-17
Pts: Shelsea 12; Rebs: Carla 19; Asts: three players 1		Pts: Regina 25; Rebs: Regina, Denise 9 Asts: Valeriana, Canata 1

Palais des Sports, Antananarivo
Referees: Omar Kettani (MAR), Bennon Soobiah (MRI), Waleed Elmoshrfy (EGY)

=== Final ===
19 July 2015
18:00

Boxscore

Nigeria	46–57	Mali
Scoring by quarter: 6-15, 11-16, 11-13, 18-13
Pts: Ibeh 16; Rebs: James, Adams 13; Asts: Ezekiel 2		Pts: Traore 15; Rebs: Kourouma, Sidibe 7 Asts: Traore 5

Palais des Sports, Antananarivo
Referees: Fikadu Gebeto (ETH), Artur de Castro (MOZ), David Manuel (ANG)

== Final standings ==
Qualified for the 2016 U-17 World Cup

Rank	Team	Record
Gold medal	Mali	7–0
Silver medal	Nigeria	5–1
Bronze medal	Angola	4–3
4	Mozambique	4–3
5	Madagascar	4–2
6	Tunisia	2–5
7	Egypt	2–4
8	Morocco	0–6
9	Rwanda	0–4

Mali roster
Assetou Bagayoko, Assetou Sissoko, Astan Diarra, Awa Sidibe, Djeneba Sangare, Mariam Diabate, Mariam Drame, Mariam Traore, Nafatoumata Haidara, Rokia Doumbia, Safiatou Mariko, Salimatou Kourouma, Coach: Oumarou Sidiya

== Awards ==
2015 FIBA Africa Under-16 Championship for Women winners

Mali
Fourth title

Most Valuable Player
(Mali) Rokia Doumbia

=== All-Tournament Team ===
- G (Nigeria) Rita James
- G (Mozambique) Chanaya Pinto
- F (Angola) Regina Pequeno
- F (Mali) Rokia Doumbia MVP
- C (Rwanda) Bella Murekatete

== Statistical leaders ==
=== Individual Tournament Highs ===
Points

Rank	Name	G	Pts	PPG
1	(Angola) Regina Pequeno	7	109	15.6
2	(Tunisia) Marwa Shili	7	108	15.4
3	(Mali) Rokia Doumbia	7	104	14.9
4	(Mozambique) Chanaya Pinto	7	101	14.4
5	(Rwanda) Bella Murekatete	4	57	14.3
6	(Nigeria) Rita James	6	75	12.5
7	(Mali) Salimatou Kourouma	7	87	12.4
8	(Madagascar) Minaoharisoa Jaofera	6	73	12.2
9	(Tunisia) Eya Chabbouh	7	83	11.9
10	(Mozambique) Madina Câmara	7	78	11.1

Rebounds

Rank	Name	G	Rbs	RPG
1	(Rwanda) Bella Murekatete	4	88	22
2	(Madagascar) Jessica Vavisoa	6	92	15.3
3	(Nigeria) Ene Adams	6	81	13.5
4	(Mozambique) Carla Covane	7	85	12.1
5	(Nigeria) Onome Akinbode-James	6	62	10.3
6	(Tunisia) Nada Hamrouni	7	68	9.7
6	(Mozambique) Chanaya Pinto	7	68	9.7
8	(Mali) Awa Sidibe	7	63	9
9	(Rwanda) Marie Utamuriza	4	35	8.8
10	(Mali) Salimatou Kourouma	7	58	8.3

Assists

Rank	Name	G	Ast	APG
1	(Madagascar) Rojohasina Lahatra	6	22	3.7
2	(Mali) Rokia Doumbia	7	20	2.9
3	(Madagascar) Minaoharisoa Jaofera	6	17	2.8
4	(Tunisia) Marwa Shili	7	19	2.7
5	(Mozambique) Chanaya Pinto	7	18	2.6
6	(Egypt) Farida Mostafa	6	14	2.3
6	(Mali) Mariam Traore	6	14	2.3
8	(Egypt) Rania Mohamed	6	12	2
9	(Rwanda) Martha Twisungimana	4	8	2
10	(Tunisia) Sirine Ben Gara	7	13	1.9

2-point field goal percentage

Rank	Name	2PA	2PM	2P%
1	(Mali) Rokia Doumbia	44	25	56.8
2	(Egypt) Reem Khalaf	38	20	52.6
3	(Mali) Awa Sidibe	55	27	49.1
4	(Rwanda) Bella Murekatete	40	19	47.5
5	(Egypt) Tarek Mahinour	30	14	46.7
6	(Tunisia) Eya Chabbouh	48	22	45.8
7	(Mali) Mariam Traore	47	21	44.7
8	(Mali) Salimatou Kourouma	81	35	43.2
9	(Mozambique) Madina Câmara	65	28	43.1
10	(Angola) Regina Pequeno	92	38	41.3

3-point field goal percentage

Rank	Name	3PA	3PM	3P%
1	(Madagascar) Minaoharisoa Jaofera	20	11	55
2	(Madagascar) Rojohasina Lahatra	20	8	40
3	(Morocco) Maria Makhoukhi	24	8	33.3
4	(Rwanda) Fionah Ishimwe	10	3	30
5	(Nigeria) Rita James	46	13	28.3
6	(Mozambique) Chanaya Pinto	32	9	28.1
7	(Mali) Rokia Doumbia	47	13	27.7
8	(Mali) Djeneba Sangare	33	8	24.2
9	(Egypt) Aya Mahmoud	17	4	23.5
10	(Mozambique) Ester Gomes	22	5	22.7

Free throw percentage

Rank	Name	FTA	FTM	FT%
1	(Tunisia) Nada Hamrouni	21	15	71.4
2	(Egypt) Merna Elbarbary	13	9	69.2
3	(Egypt) Reem Khalaf	18	12	66.7
4	(Nigeria) Isioma Oduah	15	10	66.7
5	(Tunisia) Marwa Shili	54	35	64.8
6	(Madagascar) Minaoharisoa Jaofera	28	18	64.3
7	(Madagascar) Elinah Ranarisaona	22	14	63.6
8	(Tunisia) Haifa Helali	46	29	63
9	(Angola) Breone Caculo	55	34	61.8
10	(Mozambique) Madina Câmara	31	19	61.3

Steals

Rank	Name	G	Sts	SPG
1	(Mali) Salimatou Kourouma	7	30	4.3
2	(Tunisia) Marwa Shili	7	25	3.6
3	(Angola) Valeriana Moxi	7	23	3.3
3	(Angola) Denise Pascoal	7	23	3.3
5	(Nigeria) Rita James	6	17	2.8
5	(Morocco) Rkia Mouharrar	6	17	2.8
7	(Egypt) Merna Elbarbary	4	11	2.8
8	(Mali) Djeneba Sangare	7	19	2.7
9	(Mali) Rokia Doumbia	7	18	2.6
9	(Angola) Isabel Fernando	7	18	2.6

Blocks

Rank	Name	G	Bks	BPG
1	(Rwanda) Bella Murekatete	4	11	2.8
2	(Tunisia) Sirine Ben Gara	7	11	1.6
3	(Egypt) Reem Khalaf	6	8	1.3
3	(Morocco) Oumaima Rihane	6	8	1.3
5	(Mozambique) Chanaya Pinto	7	7	1
6	(Nigeria) Onome Akinbode-James	6	6	1
7	(Nigeria) Ene Adams	6	5	0.8
7	(Madagascar) Jessica Vavisoa	6	5	0.8
9	(Angola) Denise Pascoal	7	5	0.7
9	(Tunisia) Marwa Shili	7	5	0.7

Turnovers

Rank	Name	G	Tos	TPG
1	(Rwanda) Bella Murekatete	4	51	12.8
2	(Rwanda) Martha Twisungimana	4	42	10.5
3	(Rwanda) Marie Utamuriza	4	33	8.3
4	(Rwanda) Phionah Umutoniwase	4	23	5.8
5	(Tunisia) Marwa Shili	7	39	5.6
6	(Angola) Regina Pequeno	7	37	5.3
7	(Morocco) Aicha El Azri	6	32	5.3
8	(Nigeria) Monica Ezekiel	6	31	5.2
8	(Nigeria) Rita James	6	31	5.2
10	(Mozambique) Chanaya Pinto	7	36	5.1

=== Individual Game Highs ===
Department	Name	Total	Opponent
Points	(Tunisia) Haifa Helali	26	Egypt
Rebounds	(Madagascar) Jessica Vavisoa	40	Tunisia
Assists	(Tunisia) Marwa Shili	8	Rwanda
Steals	(Mali) Salimatou Kourouma	10	Angola
Blocks	(Tunisia) Sirine Ben Gara (Rwanda) Bella Murekatete	5	Nigeria; Mozambique
2-point field goal percentage	(Morocco) Nissrine Khessassi	100% (6/6)	Egypt
3-point field goal percentage	(Angola) Isabel Fernando (Mali) Assetou Sissoko	100% (2/2)	Madagascar; Morocco
Free throw percentage	five players	100% (4/4)	
Turnovers	(Rwanda) Bella Murekatete (Rwanda) Martha Twisungimana	14	Mozambique; Angola; Mali

=== Team Tournament Highs ===
Points

Pos.	Name	PPG
1	Mali	81.9
2	Angola	61.1
3	Madagascar	60.7
4	Mozambique	60.1
5	Tunisia	58.6
6	Egypt	57.2
7	Nigeria	51.8
8	Morocco	34.7
9	Rwanda	34

Rebounds

Pos.	Name	RPG
1	Mali	58.6
2	Nigeria	58.5
3	Mozambique	57.7
4	Rwanda	55
5	Tunisia	52.9
6	Madagascar	49.8
7	Angola	49.4
8	Egypt	46.7
9	Morocco	42.5

Assists

Pos.	Name	APG
1	Mali	12.7
2	Madagascar	12
3	Egypt	11.8
4	Tunisia	8.7
5	Rwanda	7.3
6	Mozambique	7
7	Morocco	6.8
8	Nigeria	6.3
9	Angola	5.4

Steals

Pos.	Name	SPG
1	Mali	20.1
2	Angola	15.6
3	Nigeria	13.7
4	Madagascar	13.5
5	Mozambique	12.1
6	Tunisia	11.4
7	Morocco	10.2
8	Egypt	8.8
9	Rwanda	7

Blocks

Pos.	Name	BPG
1	Egypt	3.2
2	Tunisia	3.1
3	Morocco	2.8
4	Rwanda	2.8
5	Mali	2.7
6	Nigeria	2
7	Mozambique	1.9
8	Madagascar	1.8
9	Angola	1.6

Fouls

Pos.	Name	FPG
1	Angola	23.3
2	Tunisia	22.1
3	Rwanda	21.5
4	Madagascar	21
5	Mozambique	20.4
6	Mali	19.9
7	Egypt	18.7
8	Morocco	17.5
9	Nigeria	14.2

2-point field goal percentage

Pos.	Name	%
1	Egypt	44.2
2	Mali	43.8
3	Tunisia	33.4
4	Angola	33
5	Mozambique	32.8
6	Madagascar	31.6
7	Nigeria	29.9
8	Rwanda	25.1
9	Morocco	22.8

3-point field goal percentage

Pos.	Name	%
1	Madagascar	25.4
2	Mali	22.4
3	Morocco	21.3
4	Nigeria	20.5
5	Mozambique	17.9
6	Rwanda	16.1
7	Angola	15.4
8	Tunisia	15.2
9	Egypt	11

Free throw percentage

Pos.	Name	%
1	Madagascar	63.5
2	Egypt	60.2
3	Tunisia	59.6
4	Mali	54.9
5	Angola	48.6
6	Morocco	46.3
7	Nigeria	45.5
8	Mozambique	45.5
9	Rwanda	34.2

=== Team Game highs ===
Department	Name	Total	Opponent
Points	Mali	111	Rwanda
Rebounds	Mali	86	Tunisia
Steals	Mali	38	Rwanda
Assists	Egypt	20	Morocco
Blocks	Tunisia	8	Angola
2-point field goal percentage	Mali	50% (30/60)	Angola
3-point field goal percentage	Rwanda	50% (2/4)	Angola
Free throw percentage	Madagascar	87.5% (14/21)	Tunisia
Turnovers	Rwanda	59	Mozambique; Angola

== See also ==
- 2015 FIBA Africa Championship for Women
