= Uganda women's national under-16 basketball team =

Uganda
- FIBA zone: FIBA Africa
- National federation: Federation of Uganda Basketball Association

U17 World Cup
- Appearances: None

U16 AfroBasket
- Appearances: 3
- Medals: None

The Uganda women's national under-16 basketball team is a national basketball team of Uganda, administered by the Federation of Uganda Basketball Association. It represents the Uganda in international under-16 women's basketball competitions. It is also called the junior Gazelles.

== FIBA U16 Women's AfroBasket participations ==
| Year | Result |
|---|---|
| 2019 | 5th |
| 2021 | 4th |
| 2023 | 6th |

== See also ==
- Uganda women's national basketball team
- Uganda women's national under-18 basketball team
