= Egypt women's national under-17 basketball team =

Egypt
- FIBA zone: FIBA Africa
- National federation: Egyptian Basketball Federation
- Coach: Mohamed Abdelrahman

U17 World Cup
- Appearances: 4

U16 AfroBasket
- Appearances: 9
- Medals: (gold) Gold: (2025); (silver) Silver: (2009, 2011, 2013, 2019, 2021, 2023); (bronze) Bronze: (2017)

The Egypt women's national under-16 and under-17 basketball team is a national basketball team of Egypt, administered by the Egyptian Basketball Federation. It represents the country in international under-16 and under-17 women's basketball competitions.

== Results ==
=== U17 Women's World Cup ===
Year	Position	Pld	W	L
(France) 2010	Did not qualify			
(Netherlands) 2012	Did not qualify			
(Czech Republic) 2014	16th place	7	0	7
(Spain) 2016	Did not qualify			
(Belarus) 2018	Did not qualify			
(Hungary) 2022	11th place	7	3	4
(Mexico) 2024	11th place	7	2	5
(Czech Republic) 2026	9th place	7	3	4
(Indonesia) 2028	To be determined			
Total	4/8	28	8	20

=== U16 Women's AfroBasket ===
Year	Position	Pld	W	L
(Mali) 2009	Runners-up	5	4	1
(Egypt) 2011	Runners-up	7	6	1
(Mozambique) 2013	Runners-up	6	5	1
(Madagascar) 2015	7th place	6	2	4
(Mozambique) 2017	3rd place	6	4	2
(Rwanda) 2019	Runners-up	5	3	2
(Egypt) 2021	Runners-up	7	6	1
(Tunisia) 2023	Runners-up	6	5	1
(Rwanda) 2025	Champions	6	6	0
Total	9/9	54	41	13

== See also ==
- Egypt women's national basketball team
- Egypt women's national under-19 basketball team
- Egypt men's national under-17 basketball team
