= 2025 FIBA U16 Women's AfroBasket =

International youth basketball tournament

9th FIBA Under-16 Women's African Basketball Championship

Tournament details
- Host country: Rwanda
- City: Kigali
- Dates: 2–14 September 2025
- Teams: 11 (from 1 confederation)
- Venues: 2 (in 1 host city)

Final positions
- Champions: Egypt (1st title)
- Runners-up: Ivory Coast
- Third place: Cameroon

Official website
- www.fiba.basketball

The 2025 FIBA U16 Women's AfroBasket was the ninth edition of the African basketball championship for under-16 women's national teams. The tournament was played in Kigali, Rwanda, from 2 to 14 September 2025.

This tournament also served as a qualification for the 2026 FIBA Under-17 Women's Basketball World Cup in the Czech Republic, where the top two teams qualified.

== Participating teams ==
- Angola
- Cameroon
- Egypt
- Guinea
- Ivory Coast
- Kenya
- Mali
- Morocco
- Rwanda
- Tanzania
- Tunisia

== Group phase ==
All times are local (Central Africa Time; UTC+2).

=== Group A ===
Pos	Team	Pld	W	L	PF	PA	PD	Pts	Qualification
1	Rwanda (H)	2	1	1	106	99	+7	3	Quarterfinals
2	Tunisia	2	1	1	111	106	+5	3	Quarterfinals
3	Tanzania	2	1	1	101	113	−12	3	Quarterfinals

Source: FIBA
(H) Hosts

2 September 2025
13:30

Boxscore

Rwanda	60–41	Tanzania
Scoring by quarter: 14–3, 0–16, 26–11, 20–11

Petit Stade, Kigali

5 September 2025
13:30

Boxscore

Tunisia	53–60	Tanzania
Scoring by quarter: 18–11, 17–18, 9–12, 9–19

Petit Stade, Kigali

8 September 2025
13:30

Boxscore

Rwanda	46–58	Tunisia
Scoring by quarter: 13–10, 13–15, 15–17, 5–16

Petit Stade, Kigali

=== Group B ===
Pos	Team	Pld	W	L	PF	PA	PD	Pts	Qualification
1	Mali	3	3	0	193	114	+79	6	Quarterfinals
2	Ivory Coast	3	2	1	166	150	+16	5	Quarterfinals
3	Angola	3	1	2	162	137	+25	4	Quarterfinals
4	Guinea	3	0	3	97	217	−120	3	9th–11th place classification

Source: FIBA

3 September 2025
13:30

Boxscore

Guinea	34–74	Ivory Coast
Scoring by quarter: 13–15, 7–23, 6–18, 8–18

Petit Stade, Kigali

3 September 2025
18:30

Boxscore

Mali	52–44	Angola
Scoring by quarter: 17–15, 11–6, 14–7, 10–16

Petit Stade, Kigali

6 September 2025
11:00

Boxscore

Angola	67–31	Guinea
Scoring by quarter: 17–16, 11–6, 16–5, 23–4

Petit Stade, Kigali

6 September 2025
13:30

Boxscore

Ivory Coast	38–65	Mali
Scoring by quarter: 11–11, 11–20, 12–25, 4–9

Petit Stade, Kigali

9 September 2025
11:00

Boxscore

Mali	76–32	Guinea
Scoring by quarter: 27–12, 15–4, 17–7, 17–9

Petit Stade, Kigali

9 September 2025
16:00

Boxscore

Angola	51–54	Ivory Coast
Scoring by quarter: 19–12, 10–8, 6–17, 16–17

Petit Stade, Kigali

=== Group C ===
Pos	Team	Pld	W	L	PF	PA	PD	Pts	Qualification
1	Egypt	3	3	0	255	87	+168	6	Quarterfinals
2	Cameroon	3	2	1	144	153	−9	5	Quarterfinals
3	Kenya	3	1	2	127	203	−76	4	9th–11th place classification
4	Morocco	3	0	3	106	189	−83	3	9th–11th place classification

Source: FIBA

4 September 2025
11:00

Boxscore

Morocco	49–55	Kenya
Scoring by quarter: 16–15, 15–14, 14–10, 4–16

Petit Stade, Kigali

4 September 2025
16:00

Boxscore

Egypt	73–38	Cameroon
Scoring by quarter: 15–14, 17–11, 21–8, 20–5

Petit Stade, Kigali

7 September 2025
13:30

Boxscore

Kenya	29–92	Egypt
Scoring by quarter: 5–21, 9–20, 7–22, 8–29

Petit Stade, Kigali

7 September 2025
16:00

Boxscore

Cameroon	44–37	Morocco
Scoring by quarter: 16–10, 5–9, 11–8, 12–10

Petit Stade, Kigali

10 September 2025
13:30

Boxscore

Egypt	90–20	Morocco
Scoring by quarter: 10–5, 22–4, 31–3, 27–8

Petit Stade, Kigali

10 September 2025
16:00

Boxscore

Cameroon	62–43	Kenya
Scoring by quarter: 17–13, 17–7, 10–9, 18–14

Petit Stade, Kigali

== 9th–11th place classification ==
=== Group D ===
Pos	Team	Pld	W	L	PF	PA	PD	Pts
9	Morocco	2	2	0	95	74	+21	4
10	Kenya	2	1	1	93	91	+2	3
11	Guinea	2	0	2	84	107	−23	2

Source: FIBA

11 September 2025
11:00

Boxscore

Kenya	55–48	Guinea
Scoring by quarter: 12–13, 17–14, 12–12, 14–9

LDK Gymnasium, Kigali

12 September 2025
11:00

Boxscore

Morocco	43–38	Kenya
Scoring by quarter: 7–10, 10–9, 12–5, 14–14

LDK Gymnasium, Kigali

13 September 2025
11:00

Boxscore

Guinea	36–52	Morocco
Scoring by quarter: 3–12, 20–18, 6–16, 7–6

LDK Gymnasium, Kigali

== Playoff brackets ==
Quarterfinals
11 September
1 Egypt	83
8 Tanzania	25
11 September
4 Tunisia	42
5 Cameroon	62
11 September
2 Mali	57
7 Angola	41
11 September
3 Rwanda	41
6 Ivory Coast	69

Semifinals
13 September
Egypt	72
Cameroon	50
13 September
Mali	40
Ivory Coast	45

Final
14 September
Egypt	66
Ivory Coast	54
3rd place match
14 September
Cameroon	55
Mali	53

7th place match
12 September
Tanzania	70
Tunisia	59

5th place match
12 September
Angola	67
Rwanda	40

== Playoff results ==
=== Quarterfinals ===
11 September 2025
11:00

Boxscore

Egypt	83–25	Tanzania
Scoring by quarter: 17–7, 25–5, 21–9, 20–4

Petit Stade, Kigali

11 September 2025
13:30

Boxscore

Mali	57–41	Angola
Scoring by quarter: 18–8, 16–17, 13–10, 10–6

Petit Stade, Kigali

11 September 2025
16:00

Boxscore

Tunisia	42–62	Cameroon
Scoring by quarter: 12–14, 14–22, 3–14, 13–12

Petit Stade, Kigali

11 September 2025
18:30

Boxscore

Rwanda	41–69	Ivory Coast
Scoring by quarter: 10–19, 10–9, 9–19, 12–22

Petit Stade, Kigali

==== 7th place match ====
12 September 2025
13:30

Boxscore

Tanzania	70–59	Tunisia
Scoring by quarter: 19–14, 17–14, 18–17, 16–14

LDK Gymnasium, Kigali

==== 5th place match ====
12 September 2025
16:00

Boxscore

Angola	67–40	Rwanda
Scoring by quarter: 21–10, 15–9, 15–10, 16–11

LDK Gymnasium, Kigali

=== Semifinals ===
13 September 2025
11:00

Boxscore

Mali	40–45	Ivory Coast
Scoring by quarter: 10–8, 10–9, 11–14, 9–14

Petit Stade, Kigali

13 September 2025
13:30

Boxscore

Egypt	72–50	Cameroon
Scoring by quarter: 19–15, 19–14, 16–8, 18–13

Petit Stade, Kigali

==== 3rd place match ====
14 September 2025
11:00

Boxscore

Cameroon	55–53	Mali
Scoring by quarter: 13–13, 15–10, 3–24, 24–6

Petit Stade, Kigali

==== Final ====
14 September 2025
16:00

Boxscore

Egypt	66–54	Ivory Coast
Scoring by quarter: 22–13, 7–16, 24–8, 13–17

Petit Stade, Kigali

== Final standings ==
Rank	Team
1st place, gold medalist(s)	Egypt
2nd place, silver medalist(s)	Ivory Coast
3rd place, bronze medalist(s)	Cameroon
4	Mali
5	Angola
6	Rwanda
7	Tanzania
8	Tunisia
9	Morocco
10	Kenya
11	Guinea

Qualified for the 2026 FIBA Under-17 Women's Basketball World Cup
