= Mali women's national under-17 basketball team =

Mali
- FIBA zone: FIBA Africa
- National federation: Fédération Malienne de Basketball
- Coach: Moussa Dao

U17 World Cup
- Appearances: 7
- Medals: None

U16 AfroBasket
- Appearances: 9
- Medals: (gold) Gold: 8 (2009, 2011, 2013, 2015, 2017, 2019, 2021, 2023)

The Mali women's national under-16 and under-17 basketball team is a national basketball team of Mali, administered by the Fédération Malienne de Basketball. It represents the country in international under-16 and under-17 women's basketball competitions.

== FIBA U16 Women's AfroBasket record ==
Year	Pos.	Pld	W	L
(Mali) 2009	1st place, gold medalist(s)	5	4	1
(Egypt) 2011	1st place, gold medalist(s)	7	5	2
(Mozambique) 2013	1st place, gold medalist(s)	6	6	0
(Madagascar) 2015	1st place, gold medalist(s)	7	7	0
(Mozambique) 2017	1st place, gold medalist(s)	6	6	0
(Rwanda) 2019	1st place, gold medalist(s)	5	5	0
(Egypt) 2021	1st place, gold medalist(s)	7	6	1
(Tunisia) 2023	1st place, gold medalist(s)	6	6	0
(Rwanda) 2025	4th	6	4	2
Total	9/9	55	49	6

== FIBA Under-17 Women's Basketball World Cup record ==
Year	Pos.	Pld	W	L
(France) 2010	12th	7	0	7
(Netherlands) 2012	10th	7	1	6
(Czech Republic) 2014	12th	7	1	6
(Spain) 2016	11th	7	3	4
(Belarus) 2018	10th	7	2	5
(Hungary) 2022	10th	7	2	5
(Mexico) 2024	13th	7	3	4
(Czech Republic) 2026	Did not qualify			
(Indonesia) 2028	To be determined			
Total	7/9	49	12	37

== See also ==
- Mali women's national basketball team
- Mali women's national under-19 basketball team
- Mali men's national under-17 basketball team
