= Nigeria women's national under-17 basketball team =

Nigeria
- FIBA zone: FIBA Africa
- National federation: Nigeria Basketball Federation

U17 World Cup
- Appearances: 1
- Medals: None

U16 AfroBasket
- Appearances: 1
- Medals: (silver) Silver: 1 (2015)

The Nigeria women's national under-16 and under-17 basketball team is a national basketball team of Nigeria, administered by the Nigeria Basketball Federation. It represents the country in international under-16 and under-17 women's basketball competitions.

== History ==
=== FIBA U16 Women's AfroBasket ===
The only participation of Nigeria at the U16 women's African basketball championship was the 2015 FIBA Africa Under-16 Championship for Women, where they won the silver medal.

=== FIBA Under-17 Women's Basketball World Cup ===
Nigerian team won the right to start at the 2016 FIBA Under-17 World Championship for Women, but they were unable to travel and therefore, their results at that tournament are recorded as a forfeit.

== See also ==
- Nigeria women's national basketball team
- Nigeria women's national under-19 basketball team
- Nigeria men's national under-17 basketball team
