= Rwanda women's national under-16 basketball team =

Rwanda
- FIBA zone: FIBA Africa
- National federation: Fédération Rwandaise de Basketball Amateur

U17 World Cup
- Appearances: None

U16 AfroBasket
- Appearances: 4
- Medals: None

The Rwanda women's national under-16 basketball team is a national basketball team of Rwanda, administered by the Fédération Rwandaise de Basketball Amateur. It represents the country in international under-16 women's basketball competitions.

== FIBA U16 Women's AfroBasket participations ==
Year	Result
2015	9th
2019	6th
2023	7th
2025	6th

== See also ==
- Rwanda women's national basketball team
- Rwanda women's national under-18 basketball team
- Rwanda men's national under-16 basketball team
