= Chanaya Pinto =

Mozambican basketball player

No. 10 – Penn State Lady Lions
- Position: Forward

Personal information
- Born: 26 June 2000 (age 24); Maputo, Mozambique
- Listed height: 6 ft 1 in (1.85 m)

Career information
- College: Penn State University

Chanaya Pinto (born 26 June 2000) is a Mozambican basketball player who plays for Mozambique women's national basketball team and Penn State Lady Lions basketball

== Early life ==
Chanaya Pinto was born in Maputo, Mozambique on June 26, 2000.

== College career ==
=== Northwest Florida State College ===
She was named National Junior College Athletic Association (NJCAA) National Player of the Year and a two-time NJCAA All-American while she was at Northwest Florida State College.

As a freshman, she averaged 13.9 points and 8.3 rebounds while posting 25 double-digit scoring performances and eight double-doubles.

During her second year at the college, she averaged 14.6 points and 8.3 rebounds, led her team to its first ever NJCAA Women's Basketball National Championship, and earned second-team all-America honors.

In 2020, she was ranked No. 5 in World Exposure Report's annual Juco Top 25 alongside Masengo Mutanda (ranked No. 20), named FCSAA/Region VIII All-State and All-Panhandle Conference where she averaged 13.9 points, 8.3 rebounds and 2.8 assists per game. Her 72 steals were eighth-most in the FCSAA, while her 258 rebounds were seventh most.

=== University of Oregon ===
Pinto played with the Oregon Ducks for a season (2021–2022) where she recorded 18 steals, appeared in 30 games, averaged 11.4 minutes, 2.9 points, and 2.4 rebounds per game.

== National team career ==
In 2023, Pinto returned to the FIBA Women's AfroBasket tournament after 2017 to represent her country at the 2023 FIBA Women's AfroBasket.
