= 2017 FIBA U16 Women's African Championship =

2017 FIBA U16 Women's AfroBasket
5th FIBA Under-16 Women's African Basketball Championship

Tournament details
- Host country: Mozambique
- City: Beira
- Dates: 5–12 August 2017
- Teams: 5 (from 1 confederation)
- Venue: 1 (in 1 host city)

Final positions
- Champions: Mali (5th title)

Tournament statistics
- MVP: (Mali) Aissetou Coulibaly
- Top scorer: (Mali) Coulibaly (21.8)
- Top rebounds: (Zimbabwe) Mabika (10.3)
- Top assists: (Mali) F. Kone (4.0)
- PPG (Team): Mali (74.2)
- RPG (Team): Zimbabwe (33.8)
- APG (Team): Mali (14.8)

Official website
- www.fiba.basketball

The 2017 FIBA U16 Women's African Championship was the 5th FIBA U16 Women's African Championship, played under the rules of FIBA, the world governing body for basketball, and the FIBA Africa thereof. The tournament was hosted by Mozambique from 5 to 12 August 2017, with the games played in Beira.

Mali claimed their record fifth straight continental title by trouncing Angola in the Finals, 68–29. Both teams will represent FIBA Africa at the 2018 FIBA Under-17 Women’s Basketball World Cup.

== Hosts Selection ==
On 25 March 2016, FIBA Africa announced that Mozambique will host the tournament.

== Venue ==
Beira	2017 FIBA U16 Women's African Championship is located in Mozambique

== Qualification ==
Event	Date	Location	Vacancies	Qualified
2017 AfroBasket U16 Women Preliminaries Zone 1	12–16 June 2017 (Note: Four countries will participate: hosts Morocco, Algeria and Tunisia. The qualifier will be played in a round-robin format.)	(Morocco) NA	1	—N/a
2017 AfroBasket U16 Women Preliminaries Zone 2	Cancelled (Note: Competition was cancelled. The qualifiers of this zone are cancelled as no team registered for the regional tournament. Mali was added later.)	NA	1	Mali
2017 AfroBasket U16 Women Preliminaries Zone 3	9–14 June 2017 (Note: Four countries will participate: hosts Togo, Benin, Burkina Faso and Ivory Coast. The qualifier will be played in a round-robin format. Nigeria was added later.)	(Togo) Lomé	1	—N/a
2017 AfroBasket U16 Women Preliminaries Zone 4	Cancelled (Note: Competition was cancelled. The qualifiers of this zone are cancelled as no team registered for the regional tournament.)	NA	1	—N/a
2017 AfroBasket U16 Women Preliminaries Zone 5	1–6 June 2017 (Note: Four countries participated: hosts Kenya, Tanzania, Rwanda and the eventual zone winner Egypt. The tournament was played in round-robin format.)	(Kenya) Mombasa	1	Egypt
2017 AfroBasket U16 Women Preliminaries Zone 6	TBD (Note: Two teams will participate: hosts Zimbabwe and Mozambique. Mozambique already qualified as the tournament hosts. The tournament will be played over two games. Angola and Zimbabwe were added later.)	(Zimbabwe) Harare	3	Mozambique; Angola; Zimbabwe
2017 AfroBasket U16 Women Preliminaries Zone 7	Cancelled (Note: Competition was cancelled. The qualifiers of this zone are cancelled as no team registered for the regional tournament.)	NA	1	—N/a
Total			5	

== Participating teams ==
- Angola
- Egypt
- Mali
- Mozambique
- Zimbabwe

== Format ==
The first round will be played in a round-robin format. The top four teams will advance to the Final Phase which will be played in a knockout format (Semi-Finals, Final). The Third-Place Game and the Final will be played on the last day of the tournament (August 12).

== Group phase ==
All times are in Central Africa Time (UTC+2:00)

Pos	Team	Pld	W	L	PF	PA	PD	Pts	Qualification
1	Mali	4	4	0	314	131	+183	8	Advanced to Semi-finals
2	Egypt	4	3	1	208	216	−8	7	Advanced to Semi-finals
3	Angola	4	2	2	202	202	0	6	Advanced to Semi-finals
4	Mozambique (H)	4	1	3	199	243	−44	5	Advanced to Semi-finals
5	Zimbabwe	4	0	4	136	267	−131	4	Eliminated

Source: FIBA Africa
(H) Hosts

5 August
15:00

Box Scores

Egypt	33–66	Mali
Scoring by quarter: 14–15, 4–14, 9–13, 6–24
Pts: Elgizawy 12; Rebs: Elgizawy 5 Asts: Mohamed 3		Pts: S. Koné 23; Rebs: S. Koné 11; Asts: F. Kone 4

Ferroviario da Beira Stadium, Beira
Referees: Walelign Fikadu Gebeto (ETH), Joyce Muchenu (ZIM), Francisco Tando (ANG)

5 August
18:00

Box Scores

Zimbabwe	39–48	Mozambique
Scoring by quarter: 3–10, 10–16, 11–10, 15–12
Pts: Mutengo 12; Rebs: Mutsahuni 7 Asts: Mutengo 2		Pts: Massingue 20; Rebs: Sumbane, Rijal 7 Asts: Massingue 3

Ferroviario da Beira Stadium, Beira
Referees: Aya Khaled Abdelmohsed Ahmed (EGY), Youssouf Maiga (MLI), Dorothy Judy Okatch (BOT)

6 August
16:00

Box Scores

Egypt	55–46	Zimbabwe
Scoring by quarter: 12–9, 10–14, 17–10, 16–13
Pts: Kabil 11; Rebs: Abouelkhair, Abdelalim, Abdullah 5 Asts: Badawy 4		Pts: Mabika 16; Rebs: Mabika 19; Asts: Zwinake 2

Ferroviario da Beira Stadium, Beira
Referees: Dorothy Judy Okatch (BOT), Francisco Tando (ANG), Buyiswa Tshemese (RSA)

6 August
18:00

Box Scores

Angola	64–57	Mozambique
Scoring by quarter: 13–18, 12–13, 25–9, 14–17
Pts: Lourenço, Caetano 14; Rebs: Pululo, Dizeko, André 4 Asts: Dizeko 1		Pts: Massingue 18; Rebs: Massingue, Paxixe, Rijal 6 Asts: Magoliço, Sigauque, Paxixe 1

Ferroviario da Beira Stadium, Beira
Referees: Walelign Fikadu Gebeto (ETH), Youssouf Maiga (MLI), Joyce Muchenu (ZIM)

7 August
16:00

Box Scores

Mali	112–22	Zimbabwe
Scoring by quarter: 23–7, 39–3, 23–9, 27–3
Pts: Coulibaly 26; Rebs: S. Koné 8 Asts: F. Kone, Sangare 6		Pts: Mabika 10; Rebs: Zwinake 7 Asts: Mutengo 1

Ferroviario da Beira Stadium, Beira
Referees: Aya Khaled Abdelmohsed Ahmed (EGY), Francisco Tando (ANG), Buyiswa Tshemese (RSA)

7 August
18:00

Box Scores

Angola	43–56	Egypt
Scoring by quarter: 11–13, 8–23, 16–8, 8–12
Pts: Caetano 15; Rebs: Dizeko, Antonio 5 Asts: Antonio, Caetano 2		Pts: Elgizawy 22; Rebs: Abdullah 9 Asts: Elgizawy 3

Ferroviario da Beira Stadium, Beira
Referees: Youssouf Maiga (MLI), Joyce Muchenu (ZIM), Dorothy Judy Okatch (BOT)

8 August
16:00

Box Scores

Zimbabwe	29–52	Angola
Scoring by quarter: 8–13, 9–10, 6–16, 6–13
Pts: Mutengo 8 Rebs: Mabika 12; Asts: Mutengo 2		Pts: Antonio 14; Rebs: Quipaca 8 Asts: Lourenço 3

Ferroviario da Beira Stadium, Beira

8 August
18:00

Box Scores

Mozambique	33–76	Mali
Scoring by quarter: 6–19, 7–9, 14–19, 6–29
Pts: Sigauque 8 Rebs: Rijal 12; Asts: Massingue 4		Pts: Coulibaly 27; Rebs: S. Koné 8 Asts: F. Kone, Sissoko 4

Ferroviario da Beira Stadium, Beira

9 August
16:00

Box Scores

Mali	60–43	Angola
Scoring by quarter: 15–6, 14–8, 15–16, 16–13
Pts: Coulibaly 19; Rebs: S. Koné 9 Asts: Coulibaly 6		Pts: Lourenço 10; Rebs: Antonio 5 Asts: Antonio 3

Ferroviario da Beira Stadium, Beira

9 August
18:00

Box Scores

Mozambique	61–64	Egypt
Scoring by quarter: 20–9, 14–13, 14–16, 13–26
Pts: McDonald 18; Rebs: Rijal 10; Asts: Sigauque 5		Pts: Elshishiny 15; Rebs: Abdelalim 5 Asts: Abouelkhair, Badawy, Mohamed 1

Ferroviario da Beira Stadium, Beira

== Final round ==
Finalists qualified for the 2018 FIBA Under-17 Women’s Basketball World Cup.

Semifinals
11 August
Mali	63
Mozambique	39
11 August
Egypt	42
Angola	59

Final
12 August
Mali	68
Angola	29
Third place
12 August
Mozambique	38
Egypt	56

=== Semi-finals ===
11 August
16:00

Boxscore

Egypt	42–59	Angola
Scoring by quarter: 7–11, 10–25, 14–15, 11–8
Pts: Elgizawy 15; Rebs: Abouelkhair 4 Asts: Abdelalim 3		Pts: Lourenço 16; Rebs: Dizeko, Caetano 5 Asts: Antonio 3

Ferroviario da Beira Stadium, Beira

11 August
18:00

Boxscore

Mali	63–39	Mozambique
Scoring by quarter: 15–8, 16–13, 15–5, 17–13
Pts: Coulibaly 17; Rebs: S. Koné 7 Asts: F. Kone 4		Pts: Sigauque 11; Rebs: Rijal 12; Asts: Machava, Massingue, McDonald 2

Ferroviario da Beira Stadium, Beira

=== Bronze medal match ===
12 August
14:00

Boxscore

Mozambique	38–56	Egypt
Scoring by quarter: 10–13, 9–10, 9–20, 10–13
Pts: Magoliço 9 Rebs: Rijal 7 Asts: McDonald 3		Pts: Abdullah 16; Rebs: Abdullah 6 Asts: Badawy, Elgizawy 2

Ferroviario da Beira Stadium, Beira

=== Final ===
12 August
16:00

Boxscore

Mali	68–29	Angola
Scoring by quarter: 16–11, 17–4, 21–7, 14–7
Pts: Coulibaly 25; Rebs: S. Koné 9 Asts: F. Kone 6		Pts: Dizeko 13; Rebs: Dizeko 7 Asts: Lourenço 3

Ferroviario da Beira Stadium, Beira

== Statistical Leaders ==
Final statistics at the end of the tournament:

=== Players ===
Points

Rank	Player	Points
1	(Mali) Aissetou Coulibaly	21.8
2	(Egypt) Habiba Hatem Ibrahim Mahmous Elgizawy	13.7
2	(Mali) Sika Kone	13.7
4	(Mozambique) Noémia Alexandre Massingue	10.8
5	(Angola) Cristina João Laurenço	10.5

Rebounds

Rank	Player	Rebounds
1	(Zimbabwe) Tadiwa Mabika	10.3
2	(Mozambique) Suraya Rijal	9.0
3	(Mali) Sika Kone	8.7
4	(Mali) Aminata Brahima Sangare	5.3
5	(Zimbabwe) Maria Mutengo	4.8

Assists

Rank	Player	Assists
1	(Mali) Fanta Kone	4.0
2	(Mali) Aissetou Coulibaly	2.7
3	(Mozambique) Noémia Alexandre Massingue	2.2
4	(Angola) Cacia Antonio	1.8
5	(Egypt) Ingy Salaheldin Farag Aly Badawy	1.7

Blocks

Rank	Player

Steals

Rank	Player

Other statistical leaders

Rank	Player	Averages
Field Goal		

== Awards ==
2017 Under-16 African champions

Mali
Fifth title

- Most Valuable Player: (Mali) Aissetou Coulibaly

The All-Star Five:

Position	Player	Country Origin
PG	Noemia Alexandre Massingue	Mozambique
SG	Habiba Elgizawy	Egypt
SF	Aissetou Coulibaly	Mali
PF	Cacia Antonio	Angola
C	Sika Kone	Mali

== Final ranking ==
Qualified to the 2018 FIBA Under-17 Women’s Basketball World Cup.

Rank	Team	Record
1st place, gold medalist(s)	Mali	6–0
2nd place, silver medalist(s)	Angola	5–1
3rd place, bronze medalist(s)	Egypt	4–2
4	Mozambique	1–5
5	Zimbabwe	0–4
