= 2019 FIBA U16 Women's African Championship =

2019 FIBA Africa Under-16 Women's Championship
6th FIBA Africa Under-16 Women's Championship

Tournament details
- Host country: Rwanda
- City: Kigali
- Dates: 28 July – 3 August 2019
- Teams: 7
- Venue(s): 1 (in 1 host city)

Final positions
- Champions: Mali (6th title)
- Runners-up: Egypt
- Third place: Angola

Tournament statistics
- Games played: 18
- MVP: (Mali) Mariam Coulibaly
- Top scorer: (Angola) Sara Caetano (31.0 ppg)
- Top rebounds: (Uganda) Maria Najjuma (28.0 rpg)
- Top assists: (Mali) Sira Thienou (6.6 apg)

Official website
- www.fiba.basketball

The 2019 FIBA Africa U16 Championship for Women was the 6th FIBA Africa U16 Championship for Women, played under the rules of FIBA, the world governing body for basketball, and the FIBA Africa thereof. The tournament was hosted by Rwanda from 26 July to 4 August, with the games played in Kigali. The top two teams qualified for the 2020 FIBA U17 Women's Basketball World Cup in Romania.

== Venue ==
Kigali	2019 FIBA U16 Women's African Championship is located in Rwanda
Kigali Arena	2019 FIBA U16 Women's African Championship is located in Rwanda
Capacity: 10,000	2019 FIBA U16 Women's African Championship is located in Rwanda

== Group stage ==
All teams played in a single-round robin. The top team in the group that had four teams outright qualified for the semifinals, while the rest advanced to the quarterfinals.

=== Group A ===
Pos	Team	Pld	W	L	PF	PA	PD	Pts	Qualification
1	Angola	3	3	0	215	151	+64	6	Advanced to the semifinals
2	Mozambique	3	2	1	194	165	+29	5	Advanced to the quarterfinals
3	Tanzania	3	1	2	142	185	−43	4	Advanced to the quarterfinals
4	Rwanda (H)	3	0	3	122	172	−50	3	Advanced to the quarterfinals

Source: Official website
(H) Hosts

28 July 2019

Boxscore

Rwanda	36–42	Tanzania
Scoring by quarter: 9–7, 8–8, 12–18, 7–9
Pts: Umunezero 13; Rebs: Hahirwa 12; Asts: 2 players 3 each		Pts: Mollel 12; Rebs: Mbugeni 20; Asts: Mbugeni 4

Kigali Arena, Kigali

28 July 2019

Boxscore

Angola	76–54	Mozambique
Scoring by quarter: 19–6, 10–13, 22–15, 25–20
Pts: Caetano 30; Rebs: Caetano 19; Asts: Caetano 4		Pts: Mabjaia, do Alvar 9 each Rebs: Joaqium 14; Asts: Mabjaia 5

Kigali Arena, Kigali

29 July 2019

Boxscore

Tanzania	52–78	Mozambique
Scoring by quarter: 15–15, 13–15, 10–23, 14–25
Pts: Catherine Mollel 20; Rebs: Anna Mollel 13; Asts: Mbugeni 2		Pts: Chivale 29; Rebs: Julio 11; Asts: 2 players 4 each

Kigali Arena, Kigali

29 July 2019

Boxscore

Rwanda	49–68	Angola
Scoring by quarter: 18–21, 9–23, 12–14, 10–10
Pts: Uwimpuhwe 11; Rebs: Umunezero 8 Asts: Umunezero 4		Pts: Caetano 33; Rebs: Caetano 17; Asts: Caetano 2

Kigali Arena, Kigali

30 July 2019

Boxscore

Angola	71–48	Tanzania
Scoring by quarter: 21–7, 15–14, 19–12, 16–15
Pts: Caetano 27; Rebs: Joao 18; Asts: Mbemba 4		Pts: Catherine Mollel 22; Rebs: Catherine Mollel 14; Asts: Laizer 5

Kigali Arena, Kigali

30 July 2019

Boxscore

Rwanda	37–62	Mozambique
Scoring by quarter: 7–22, 16–13, 7–19, 7–8
Pts: Umunezero 9 Rebs: 2 players 12 each Asts: 4 players 2 each		Pts: Joaqium 20; Rebs: Chivale 13; Asts: Chivale 6

Kigali Arena, Kigali

=== Group B ===
Pos	Team	Pld	W	L	PF	PA	PD	Pts	Qualification
1	Mali	2	2	0	196	89	+107	4	Advanced to the quarterfinals
2	Egypt	2	1	1	137	134	+3	3	Advanced to the quarterfinals
3	Uganda	2	0	2	78	188	−110	2	Advanced to the quarterfinals

Source: Official website

28 July 2019

Boxscore

Mali	108–32	Uganda
Scoring by quarter: 31–7, 23–5, 41–8, 13–12
Pts: Coulibaly 26; Rebs: Haidara 11; Asts: 3 players 4 each		Pts: Najjuma 8 Rebs: Najjuma 10; Asts: 2 players 2 each

Kigali Arena, Kigali

29 July 2019

Boxscore

Uganda	46–80	Egypt
Scoring by quarter: 10–25, 10–17, 15–23, 11–15
Pts: Amaniyo 18; Rebs: Najjuma 22; Asts: Nantume 3		Pts: Yassine 18; Rebs: Aya El-Fiky 14; Asts: 2 players 4 each

Kigali Arena, Kigali

30 July 2019

Boxscore

Mali	88–57	Egypt
Scoring by quarter: 18–11, 25–11, 27–23, 18–12
Pts: Thienou 27; Rebs: Haidara 15; Asts: Thienou 6		Pts: Elfatairy 9 Rebs: Aya El-Fiky 11; Asts: 3 players 2 each

Kigali Arena, Kigali

== Knockout stage ==
All times are in local time, UTC+02:00. Bracket is made based on the official FIBA website.

Bracket

Quarterfinals
A3	Tanzania	41
B2	Egypt	88
A4	Rwanda	32
B1	Mali	112
B3	Uganda	69
A2	Mozambique	73

Semifinals
A1	Angola	50
B2	Egypt	71
B1	Mali	102
A2	Mozambique	25

Final
B2	Egypt	48
B1	Mali	84
Bronze medal match
A1	Angola	67
A2	Mozambique	59

Classification bracket

Classification semifinal			5th place match
			B3	Uganda	66
A3	Tanzania	32	A4	Rwanda	51
A4	Rwanda	38

=== Quarterfinals ===
1 August 2019

Tanzania	vs.	Egypt

Kigali Arena, Kigali

1 August 2019

Rwanda	vs.	Mali

Kigali Arena, Kigali

1 August 2019

Uganda	vs.	Mozambique

Kigali Arena, Kigali

=== Classification semifinal ===
Winner advanced to the fifth place match, loser is ranked as seventh place.

2 August 2019

Tanzania	vs.	Rwanda

Kigali Arena, Kigali

=== Semifinals ===
Winners qualified for the 2020 FIBA U17 Women's Basketball World Cup.

2 August 2019

Angola	vs.	Egypt

Kigali Arena, Kigali

2 August 2019

Mali	vs.	Mozambique

Kigali Arena, Kigali

=== 5th place match ===
3 August 2019

Rwanda	vs.	Uganda
Scoring by quarter: –, –, –, –

Kigali Arena, Kigali

=== Bronze medal match ===
3 August 2019

Angola	vs.	Mozambique

Kigali Arena, Kigali

=== Final ===
3 August 2019

Egypt	vs.	Mali

Kigali Arena, Kigali
