= Aya El-Fiky =

Egyptian basketball player (born 2003)

Aya El-Fiky (born 29 March 2003) is an Egyptian basketball player who plays for the Egyptian women's basketball team and also Al Ahly Sporting Club in Egypt. She is 5 ft 10 in tall. And plays as a forward in her basketball career.

== Career ==
=== National Team Senior ===
- In the 2023 FIBA Women's AfroBasket, she played 2 games, averaging 0.5 points, 0.5 rebounds, 0 assists, and an efficiency rating of 0.
- Overall, her total averages for the national team senior level are 0.5 points, 0.5 rebounds, 0 assists, and an efficiency rating of 0.

=== National Team Youth ===
- In the 2021 FIBA U19 Women's Basketball World Cup, she played 7 games, averaging 1.9 points, 4.4 rebounds, 1 assist, and an efficiency rating of 0.9.
- During the 2020 Afrobasket U18 Women, she played 5 games, averaging 5.4 points, 8 rebounds, 1.8 assists, and an efficiency rating of 10.2.
- In the 2019 FIBA U16 Women's African Championship, she played 5 games, averaging 8.4 points, 12.2 rebounds, 1.2 assists, and an efficiency rating of 15.
- Overall, her total averages for the national team youth level are 5.2 points, 8.2 rebounds, 1.3 assists, and an efficiency rating of 8.7.
