= Joanne P. McCallie =

American basketball player and coach

Joanne McCallie
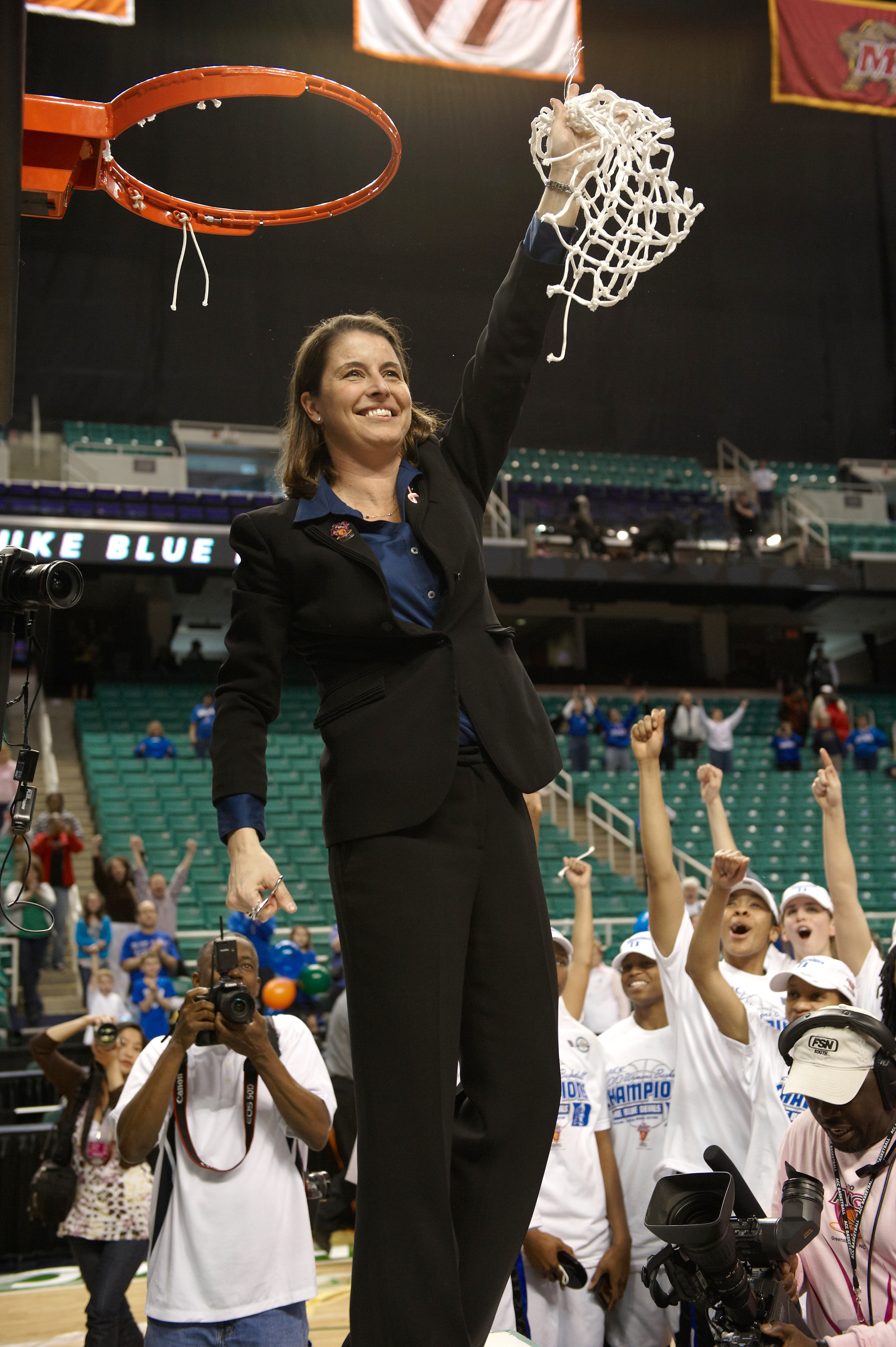
- McCallie in 2010

Biographical details
- Born: September 6, 1965 (age 61); Monterey, California, U.S.

Playing career
- 1984–1987: Northwestern
- Position: Guard

Coaching career (HC unless noted)
- 1988–1992: Auburn (asst.)
- 1992–2000: Maine
- 2000–2007: Michigan State
- 2006: USA U-20
- 2007: USA U-21
- 2007–2020: Duke

Head coaching record
- Overall: 646–255 (.717)

Accomplishments and honors

Championships
- 4× ACC regular season (2010–2013); 3× ACC tournament (2010, 2011, 2013); Big Ten regular season (2005); Big Ten tournament (2005); 4× NAC/America East regular season (1995–1997, 1999)

Awards
- 2× ACC Coach of the Year (2010, 2012); Big Ten Coach of the Year (2005); 3× America East Coach of the Year (1995, 1996, 1999); AP Coach of the Year (2005); Basketball Times Coach of the Year (2005)

Joanne Palombo-McCallie (born Joanne Elizabeth Palombo; September 6, 1965) is an American college basketball coach and advocate for mental health who most recently served as the head coach of the Duke University women's basketball team.

McCallie became the first Division I head coach to win a conference title in four different conferences (the ACC, Big Ten, America East and North Atlantic), and also the first Division I coach to be named conference coach of the year in four different conferences. She was only the second Division I head coach to lead two different programs to 30-win seasons, and also to lead two different programs to a No. 1 seed in the NCAA tournament. McCallie has three National Championship game appearances in her career (one as a head coach and two as an assistant), and has been named conference coach of the year five times. She has coached twelve players who have received All-America honors, and at Duke alone, sixteen players have gone on to play professionally, six being first-round picks.

McCallie has also won a gold medal as coach of the 2006 U20 National team and the 2007 U21 World Championship team. Since her first season at Duke in 2007, McCallie has led the Women's basketball team to an overall record of 141–32, a 60–12 record in the ACC alone, and was announced the ACC Coach of the year in 2010 and 2012.

== Coaching career ==
=== Duke ===
McCallie was named head coach at Duke on April 18, 2007, replacing Gail Goestenkors, who had left to coach at Texas. McCallie won 82 games in her first three years at Duke. For a coach in her first three years at a Division I school, this was the second-most wins in NCAA Division I history. McCallie reached 100 wins at Duke in only 122 games, being the second-quickest to ever reach 100 wins at a school. In only four years, the Blue Devils had a record of 114–26 overall, a 45–11 conference record, and four NCAA Tournament selections, including a No. 1 seed in 2009 and Elite Eight appearances in 2010 and 2011. In her first season at Duke in 2007–2008, McCallie led Duke to its 10th straight 25-win season with an appearance in the ACC Championship game and a trip to the NCAA Tournament Sweet 16 which marked the 11th consecutive appearance in the regional semifinals for the program. In her fourth season, McCallie guided Duke to its seventh ACC Championship, 10th regular season ACC title in school history along with an appearance in the NCAA Elite Eight. During this season McCallie also had her second straight 30-win season at Duke, including a 17–0 mark at home in Cameron Indoor Stadium; the third undefeated campaign at home in Duke's school history and the second under McCallie. Most recently, McCallie has led the Blue Devils to the 2010 and 2011 ACC Championship, which marked the sixth and seventh overall conference titles in school history. She led Duke to its ninth 30-win season out of the last 11 years, and in 2010–11 led Duke to a 17–0 record at home; marking just the third time in school history the Blue Devils have gone undefeated in Cameron Indoor Stadium in one season. Additionally, McCallie recorded a 10–2 record for the ACC/Big Ten Challenge while at Duke.

McCallie's teams were major competitors in the NCAA Tournament. McCallie led her team to seven Sweet Sixteen games and four straight Elite Eights.

During her tenure at Duke, McCallie faced allegations of player mistreatment and verbal abuse of both players and staff. The former Duke vice president and director of athletics, Kevin White ultimately released a statement in support of McCallie, "Joanne P. McCallie is and will be, our head women's basketball coach and we support her."

In August 2017, following a season where McCallie led her team to be ranked ninth in the nation and the second round of the NCAA Tournament, Duke extended her contract through the 2020–21 season.

McCallie closed out what would be her final season (2019–20) ranked third in the ACC. The postseason was canceled due to the COVID-19 pandemic. On July 2, 2020, McCallie announced that she would not return to Duke for the 2020–21 season after 13 seasons with the school.

On February 16, 2021, McCallie released her second book 'Secret Warrior', a memoir that chronicled her battle with a bipolar diagnosis. She currently is speaking and working as an advocate for those facing mental health issues.

=== Michigan State ===
McCallie spent seven years as the head coach at Michigan State University in the Big Ten Conference. While with the Spartans, she led the team to 149 wins and 75 losses (.670), including five straight NCAA tournament appearances (2003–2007). McCallie had an overall record of 316–148 (.681) and 11 NCAA tournament appearances. She replaced Karen Langeland, who retired following 24 years as the head coach at MSU.

During the 2004/2005 season, Michigan State won its first Big Ten Tournament championship, beating Minnesota in the title game and McCallie led MSU to their first NCAA Championship game Michigan State beat Tennessee (3) in a historic national semifinals game, coming back from a 16-point deficit, and went on to lose to Baylor in the championship game. Additionally, McCallie was named the 2005 National Coach of the Year by the Associated Press and Basketball Times. Michigan State played one of the nation's toughest schedules, playing 20 of its games against teams that reached the NCAA Tournament (16-4 record in those 20 games).

While at MSU, McCallie also led the 2006 USA Basketball U20 National Team to a FIBA Americas U20 Championship and gold medal, and was selected to coach the 2007 USA Basketball Women's U21 Team in the FIBA World Championship under 21 for women. McCallie left Michigan State after accepting the head coach position at Duke University in 2007.

=== Maine ===
Prior to her time at MSU, McCallie spent eight years as the head coach at the University of Maine. During her tenure with the Black Bears, McCallie guided Maine to a record of 167–73, six-straight NCAA Tournament appearances, four North Atlantic Conference/America East Conference Championships and five regular-season conference titles. McCallie guided the Black Bears to seven-straight 20-win campaigns, including a 20–11 overall record in 1999–2000. She was named conference coach of the year three times, twice in the North Atlantic Conference (1995 and 1996) and once in the America East (1999). McCallie left Maine as the school's all-time winningest women's basketball coach with 167 victories.

=== Auburn ===
Prior to taking her first head coaching position, McCallie was an assistant coach at Auburn University from 1988 to 1992. As the team's primary recruiter, she helped sign the fourth-ranked class in the nation in 1990–91 and the 16th-ranked class in 1991–92. While at Auburn, McCallie and the Tigers appeared in two national championship games and made an appearance in the NCAA Elite Eight.

== Coaching honors ==
- National Coach of the Year by the Associated Press, Basketball Times and Nike, Inc. (2005)
- Basketball Coaches Association of Michigan College Coach of the Year (2005)
- Atlantic Coast Conference Coach of the Year (2010, 2012)
- North Atlantic Conference Coach of the Year (1995, 1996)
- America East Conference Coach of the Year (1999)
- Big Ten Coach of the Year (2005)
- New England Basketball Hall of Fame (2004)
- 11 NCAA tournament appearances as head coach (Maine: 1995–2000; Michigan State: 2003–2007)
- Five conference championships (Maine: 1995–99; Michigan State: 2005)
- FIBA Americas U-20 Gold Medal, 2006
- Fiba World U-21 Gold Medal, 2007

== Playing career ==
McCallie, then named Palombo, played Big Ten collegiate basketball at Northwestern University from 1984 – 1987. She still ranks seventh in Wildcat history with 378 career assists. As a senior, she was an All-Big Ten honorable mention selection and helped lead the Wildcats to the second round of the NCAA Tournament. McCallie also was named Academic All-Big Ten First-Team as a senior, and graduated in 1987 with a B.S. in political science. She earned a M.A. in business administration while coaching at Auburn in 1990. McCallie was inducted into the Maine Sports Legends Hall of Honors in 2005.

In 1983, representing Brunswick High School, Palombo became the first player ever from Maine named to Parade Magazine's annual All-America High School girls´ basketball team.

== Personal life ==
McCallie is the daughter of a Navy pilot, born in Monterey, California and raised in Florida, New York, Texas, Rhode Island, and finally Maine, where her Mother (Father passed in 2021) and family still live. Fred Koerber, her high school coach, was the first person to suggest that she think about coaching someday, but it was years later at Auburn before she acted on the suggestion.

McCallie is an active speaker within the community and for women's athletics. At MSU, McCallie created the "Choice Not Chance" philosophy, which focuses on making the correct choices in life. The philosophy has been widely used by McCallie, her staff and players, who have been very active in the area schools speaking about "CNC".

In addition, McCallie's community service includes working with the Big Brothers Big Sisters "Jump" program; serving as the Honorary Chair for the Haven House — a shelter for homeless families in East Lansing, Michigan; serving as the Honorary Chair for the 2001 Crop Walk and the 2001–04 Memory Walks for Alzheimer's; and holding the Joanne P. McCallie Golf Challenge benefiting children and adolescents with cancer.

While at Maine, she organized an event called "Realizing the Dream; Celebrating Women in Athletics" that featured speakers Dr. Donna Lopiano and Sheryl Swoopes. During the 1997–98 season, Dana Rae Warren filmed a documentary of the Maine women's basketball season.

Joanne and her husband, John McCallie, Ph.D. and former professor of economics at the University of North Carolina at Chapel Hill, have a daughter, Madeline (Maddie, born in 1994), and a son, John Wyatt (Jack, born in 2000).

Dr. McCallie was arrested for assault in 2007 when an incident at a Sarasota, Florida airport resulted in his biting an airport security guard.

John McCallie's grandfather and grand-uncle, Spencer Jarnigan McCallie and James Park McCallie, were the founders of The McCallie School, a preparatory school for boys in Chattanooga, Tennessee. John's great-aunt Grace McCallie was one of the founders of the Girls Preparatory School, also in Chattanooga.

== Head coaching record ==
Sources: America East Big Ten ACC

Record table
Season	Team	Overall	Conference	Standing	Postseason
Maine Black Bears (North Atlantic Conference/America East Conference) (1992–2000)
1992–93	Maine	9–20	4–10	T–6th	
1993–94	Maine	20–7	12–2	1st	
1994–95	Maine	27–5	18–0	1st	NCAA First Round
1995–96	Maine	27–5	18–0	1st	NCAA First Round
1996–97	Maine	22–8	17–1	1st	NCAA First Round
1997–98	Maine	21–9	13–5	2nd	NCAA First Round
1998–99	Maine	24–7	17–1	1st	NCAA Second Round
1999–00	Maine	20–11	14–4	2nd	NCAA First Round
Maine:		167–73 (.696)	109–25 (.813)		
Michigan State Spartans (Big Ten Conference) (2000–2007)
2000–01	Michigan State	10–18	4–12	9th	
2001–02	Michigan State	19–13	6–10	T–9th	WNIT Semifinals
2002–03	Michigan State	17–12	10–6	T–4th	NCAA First Round
2003–04	Michigan State	22–9	10–6	T–4th	NCAA Second Round
2004–05	Michigan State	33–4	14–2	T–1st	NCAA Runner–up
2005–06	Michigan State	24–10	11–5	T–3rd	NCAA Sweet 16
2006–07	Michigan State	24–9	13–3	3rd	NCAA Second Round
Michigan State:		149–75 (.665)	69–45 (.605)		
Duke Blue Devils (Atlantic Coast Conference) (2007–2020)
2007–08	Duke	25–10	10–4	T–3rd	NCAA Sweet 16
2008–09	Duke	27–6	11–3	3rd	NCAA Second Round
2009–10	Duke	30–6	12–2	1st	NCAA Elite Eight
2010–11	Duke	32–4	12–2	1st	NCAA Elite Eight
2011–12	Duke	27–6	15–1	1st	NCAA Elite Eight
2012–13	Duke	33–3	17–1	1st	NCAA Elite Eight
2013–14	Duke	28–7	12–4	2nd	NCAA Second Round
2014–15	Duke	23–11	11–5	T–4th	NCAA Sweet 16
2015–16	Duke	20–12	8–8	T–7th	
2016–17	Duke	28–6	13–3	T–2nd	NCAA Second Round
2017–18	Duke	24–9	11–5	T–4th	NCAA Sweet 16
2018–19	Duke	15–15	6–10	T–10th	
2019–20	Duke	18–12	12–6	3rd	Postseason cancelled
Duke:		330–107 (.755)	150–56 (.728)		
Total:		646–255 (.717)			
National champion Postseason invitational champion Conference regular season champion Conference regular season and conference tournament champion Division regular season champion Division regular season and conference tournament champion Conference tournament champion

== See also ==
- List of college women's basketball career coaching wins leaders
