= 2023 FIBA U16 Women's African Championship =

International youth basketball tournament

2023 FIBA U16 Women's AfroBasket
8th FIBA Under-16 Women's African Basketball Championship

Tournament details
- Host country: Tunisia
- City: Monastir, Jemmal
- Dates: 13–22 July
- Teams: 8 (from 1 confederation)
- Venue(s): 2 (in 2 host cities)

Final positions
- Champions: Mali (8th title)
- Runners-up: Egypt
- Third place: Angola

Official website
- www.fiba.basketball/history

The 2023 FIBA U16 Women's African Championship was an international basketball competition held in Monastir and Jemmal, Tunisia from 13 to 22 July 2023. It served as a qualifier for the 2024 FIBA Under-17 Women's Basketball World Cup in Mexico.

== Venues ==
Monastir	2023 FIBA U16 Women's African Championship is located in Tunisia	Jemmal
Mohamed-Mzali Sports Hall (Capacity: 5000)	2023 FIBA U16 Women's African Championship is located in Tunisia	Salle des Sports Jammel (Capacity: 2000)

== Participating teams ==
- Angola
- Egypt
- Guinea
- Mali
- Morocco
- Rwanda
- Tunisia
- Uganda

== Group phase ==
All times are local (Central European Time – UTC+1).

=== Group A ===
Pos	Team	Pld	W	L	PF	PA	PD	Pts	Qualification
1	Egypt	3	3	0	272	114	+158	6	Quarterfinals
2	Tunisia (H)	3	2	1	228	149	+79	5	Quarterfinals
3	Uganda	3	1	2	164	202	−38	4	Quarterfinals
4	Guinea	3	0	3	125	324	−199	3	Quarterfinals

Source: FIBA
(H) Hosts

14 July 2023
18:00

Boxscore

Tunisia	105–35	Guinea
Scoring by quarter: 34–8, 22–10, 29–13, 20–4

Salle des Sports Jammel

15 July 2023
13:00

Boxscore

Egypt	130–40	Guinea
Scoring by quarter: 37–6, 35–15, 27–12, 31–7

Salle des Sports Jammel

15 July 2023
18:00

Boxscore

Tunisia	74–50	Uganda
Scoring by quarter: 16–13, 19–11, 24–16, 15–10

Salle des Sports Jammel

16 July 2023
13:00

Boxscore

Guinea	50–89	Uganda
Scoring by quarter: 18–15, 16–26, 9–31, 7–17

Salle des Sports Jammel

16 July 2023
18:00

Boxscore

Tunisia	49–64	Egypt
Scoring by quarter: 15–22, 16–11, 5–21, 13–10

Salle des Sports Jammel

17 July 2023
15:30

Boxscore

Uganda	25–78	Egypt
Scoring by quarter: 7–25, 6–23, 8–14, 4–16

Salle des Sports Jammel

=== Group B ===
Pos	Team	Pld	W	L	PF	PA	PD	Pts	Qualification
1	Mali	3	3	0	290	85	+205	6	Quarterfinals
2	Angola	3	2	1	184	173	+11	5	Quarterfinals
3	Morocco	3	1	2	133	222	−89	4	Quarterfinals
4	Rwanda	3	0	3	108	235	−127	3	Quarterfinals

Source: FIBA

14 July 2023
13:00

Boxscore

Rwanda	42–53	Morocco
Scoring by quarter: 9–7, 13–16, 16–12, 4–18

Salle des Sports Jammel

14 July 2023
15:30

Boxscore

Mali	80–32	Angola
Scoring by quarter: 17–10, 26–8, 16–7, 21–7

Salle des Sports Jammel

15 July 2023
10:30

Boxscore

Mali	108–24	Rwanda
Scoring by quarter: 30–6, 33–7, 23–4, 22–7

Salle des Sports Jammel

15 July 2023
15:30

Boxscore

Morocco	51–78	Angola
Scoring by quarter: 14–13, 10–17, 14–24, 13–24

Salle des Sports Jammel

16 July 2023
10:30

Boxscore

Morocco	29–102	Mali
Scoring by quarter: 9–21, 8–23, 4–30, 8–28

Salle des Sports Jammel

16 July 2023
15:30

Boxscore

Angola	74–42	Rwanda
Scoring by quarter: 22–9, 22–11, 17–14, 13–8

Salle des Sports Jammel

== Knockout phase ==
Main bracket

Quarterfinals
18 July
Rwanda	15
Egypt	84
18 July
Uganda	58
Angola	64
19 July
Guinea	15
Mali	142
19 July
Morocco	42
Tunisia	69

Semifinals
21 July
Egypt	75
Angola	34
21 July
Mali	87
Tunisia	54

Final
22 July
Egypt	56
Mali	57
3rd place match
22 July
Angola	50
Tunisia	43

5th place bracket

5th–8th place semifinals
20 July
Rwanda	44
Uganda	65
20 July
Guinea	42
Morocco	50

5th place match
21 July
Uganda	56
Morocco	65
7th place match
21 July
Rwanda	54
Guinea	43

=== Quarterfinals ===
18 July 2023
15:30

Boxscore

Rwanda	15–84	Egypt
Scoring by quarter: 6–22, 2–15, 2–24, 5–23

Salle des Sports Jammel

18 July 2023
18:00

Boxscore

Guinea	15–142	Mali
Scoring by quarter: 7–27, 3–47, 3–21, 2–47

Salle des Sports Jammel

19 July 2023
15:30

Boxscore

Uganda	58–64	Angola
Scoring by quarter: 9–13, 19–11, 7–20, 23–20

Salle des Sports Jammel

19 July 2023
18:00

Boxscore

Morocco	42–69	Tunisia
Scoring by quarter: 17–17, 9–23, 8–14, 8–15

Salle des Sports Jammel

=== 5th–8th place semifinals ===
20 July 2023
10:30

Boxscore

Rwanda	44–65	Uganda
Scoring by quarter: 12–12, 13–15, 4–20, 15–18

Mohamed-Mzali Sports Hall

20 July 2023
13:00

Boxscore

Guinea	42–50	Morocco
Scoring by quarter: 5–13, 6–17, 21–14, 10–6

Mohamed-Mzali Sports Hall

=== Semifinals ===
21 July 2023
15:30

Boxscore

Egypt	75–34	Angola
Scoring by quarter: 12–11, 32–12, 16–2, 15–9

Mohamed-Mzali Sports Hall

21 July 2023
18:00

Boxscore

Mali	87–54	Tunisia
Scoring by quarter: 20–21, 20–5, 30–12, 17–16

Mohamed-Mzali Sports Hall

=== 7th place match ===
21 July 2023
10:30

Boxscore

Rwanda	54–43	Guinea
Scoring by quarter: 9–5, 12–17, 13–11, 20–10

Mohamed-Mzali Sports Hall

=== 5th place match ===
21 July 2023
13:00

Boxscore

Uganda	56–65	Morocco
Scoring by quarter: 5–8, 18–19, 15–21, 18–17

Mohamed-Mzali Sports Hall

=== 3rd place match ===
22 July 2023
15:30

Boxscore

Angola	50–43	Tunisia
Scoring by quarter: 12–8, 18–12, 8–8, 12–15

Mohamed-Mzali Sports Hall

=== Final ===
22 July 2023
18:00

Boxscore

Egypt	56–57	Mali
Scoring by quarter: 9–21, 18–15, 16–12, 13–9

Mohamed-Mzali Sports Hall

== Final standings ==
Rank	Team	Record	Points		
Rank	Team	Record	For	Against	Diff.
1st place, gold medalist(s)	Mali	6–0	576	210	+40
2nd place, silver medalist(s)	Egypt	5–1	487	220	+48
3rd place, bronze medalist(s)	Angola	4–2	332	308	-56
4	Tunisia	3–3	394	328	-64
5	Morocco	3–3	290	389	-68
6	Uganda	3–3	343	375	-70
7	Rwanda	1–5	221	427	-74
8	Guinea	0–6	225	570	-86

Qualified for the 2024 FIBA Under-17 Women's Basketball World Cup
