= Rokia Doumbia =

Malian basketball player (born 1999)

Personal information
- Born: 5 May 1999 (age 27) Bradenton, Florida, U.S.
- Listed height: 1.75 m (5 ft 9 in)

Career information
- High school: Central Park Christian Academy (Fayetteville, Arkansas)
- College: Arkansas (2018–2020); Purdue (2020–2022); USC (2022–2023)
- Position: Guard
- Number: 4
Medals
Women's basketball
Representing Mali
AfroBasket
| Silver medal – second place | 2021 Cameroon |
| Silver medal – second place | 2025 Ivory Coast |
| Bronze medal – third place | 2019 Senegal |

Rokia Doumbia (born 5 May 1999) is a Malian basketball player who previously played for Purdue Boilermakers and the Malian national team.

She represented Mali at the 2019 Women's Afrobasket.

== Career statistics ==
Legend
| GP | Games played | GS | Games started | MPG | Minutes per game | RPG | Rebounds per game |
| APG | Assists per game | SPG | Steals per game | BPG | Blocks per game | PPG | Points per game |
| TO | Turnovers per game | FG% | Field-goal percentage | 3P% | 3-point field-goal percentage | FT% | Free-throw percentage |
| **Bold** | Career best | ° | League leader |

=== College ===
| Year | Team | GP | GS | MPG | FG% | 3P% | FT% | RPG | APG | SPG | BPG | TO | PPG |
|---|---|---|---|---|---|---|---|---|---|---|---|---|---|
| 2018–19 | Arkansas | 23 | 0 | 5.8 | 28.1 | 15.4 | 57.1 | 1.0 | 0.4 | 0.2 | 0.1 | 0.9 | 1.0 |
| 2019–20 | Arkansas | **32** | 0 | **16.3** | 43.0 | 29.6 | 50.0 | **4.2** | 1.2 | **0.8** | **0.3** | 0.9 | 3.2 |
| 2020–21 | Purdue | 15 | 0 | 14.6 | **46.8** | 14.3 | 62.5 | 3.3 | **1.5** | 0.6 | 0.1 | 2.1 | 3.7 |
| 2021–22 | Purdue | 13 | 3 | 13.5 | 51.2 | **33.3** | 75.0 | 3.8 | 1.3 | 0.5 | 0.1 | 0.9 | **3.9** |
| 2022–23 | USC | 24 | 0 | 14.5 | 41.5 | 23.8 | **80.0** | 1.4 | 1.1 | **0.8** | 0.1 | 0.9 | 2.7 |
| **Career** | | 107 | 3 | 13.1 | 42.9 | 25.0 | 63.0 | 2.7 | 1.1 | 0.6 | 0.2 | 1.1 | 2.8 |
Statistics retrieved from Sports-Reference.
