= Alexia Dizeko =

Angolan basketball player (born 2001)

No. 9 – Florida Gators
- Position: Forward

Personal information
- Listed height: 5 ft 11 in (1.80 m)

Career information
- College: University of Florida

Career highlights
- GCAA Player of the Year (2023)

Alexia Dizeko (born 12 March 2001) is a basketball player who plays for Angola women's national team.

== Early life ==
Born in Sion, Switzerland to Angolan parents, moved to Florida Gators after earning 2023 Women's Basketball Coaches Association's Two-Year College Player of the Year honors at South Georgia Technical College.

== College career ==
=== South Georgia Technical College ===
- During her time at South Georgia Technical College, she led her team to a No. 1 national ranking for nine consecutive weeks where she averaged 8.3 rebounds, had 14.4 points per game.
- Earned WBCA first-team All-American honors
- Georgia Collegiate Athletic Association (GCAA) Player of the Year.
- As a freshman, she earned second-team All-American honors.

== International career ==
Dizeko played for Angola in the 2019 FIBA Women's Afrobasket tournament where she averaged 7.2 points per game, including a 17-point performance against Mali, shot 6-for-8 from the field and 2-for-4 from 3-point range.
