= FIBA Under-17 Women's Basketball World Cup =

International basketball tournament

FIBA U17 Women's Basketball World Cup
- Most recent season or competition: 2026 FIBA Under-17 Women's Basketball World Cup
- Formerly: FIBA Under-17 World Championship for Women
- Sport: Basketball
- Founded: 2010; 16 years ago
- First season: 2010
- Organizing body: FIBA
- No. of teams: 16
- Continents: All (World)
- Most recent champions: United States (7th title)
- Most titles: United States (7 titles)
- Related competitions: FIBA Under-19 Women's Basketball World Cup
- Website: fiba.basketball/history

The FIBA U17 Women's Basketball World Cup (formerly FIBA Under-17 World Championship for Women) is the women's international under-17 basketball championship organized by FIBA. The inaugural tournament was in July 2010, and is held biennially.

The reigning world champions are United States, winning the tournament in 2026. The next edition will be held in Indonesia in 2028.

== Composition ==
According to the updated FIBA Internal Regulations, the FIBA U17 World Cup shall be held every two years (2024, 2026, 2028, etc.).

Sixteen teams, representing all continents, are eligible to participate in the FIBA U17 Women's World Cup as follows:

- Directly qualified:
  - The host nation (usually designated by the Central Board a year before the scheduled tournament)
- From each continent:
  - Two from FIBA Africa: Finalists of the FIBA U16 Women's AfroBasket
  - Four from FIBA Americas: Semi-finalists of the FIBA U16 Women's AmeriCup
  - Four from FIBA Asia and FIBA Oceania: Semi-finalists of the FIBA U16 Women's Asia Cup
  - Five from FIBA Europe: Semi-finalists and the fifth-placed team of the FIBA U16 Women's EuroBasket

== Summaries ==
Year	Hosts	Final			Third place match		
Year	Hosts	Champions	Score	Runners-up	Third place	Score	Fourth place
2010	(France); Rodez / Toulouse	United States	92–62	France	China	85–73	Belgium
2012	(Netherlands); Amsterdam	United States	75–62	Spain	Canada	84–77	Japan
2014	(Czech Republic); Klatovy / Plzeň	United States	77–75	Spain	Hungary	67–61	Czech Republic
2016	(Spain); Zaragoza	Australia	62–38	Italy	United States	65–50	China
2018	(Belarus); Minsk	United States	92–40	France	Australia	57–51	Hungary
2020	(Romania); Cluj-Napoca	Cancelled due to the COVID-19 pandemic			Cancelled due to the COVID-19 pandemic		
2022	(Hungary); Debrecen	United States	84–62	Spain	France	84–82	Canada
2024	(Mexico); León / Irapuato	United States	84–64	Canada	Spain	47–39	France
2026	(Czech Republic); Brno	United States	82–73	Spain	Australia	64–57	Canada
2028	Indonesia						

== Medal table ==
Rank	Nation	Gold	Silver	Bronze	Total
1	United States	7	0	1	8
2	Australia	1	0	2	3
3	Spain	0	4	1	5
4	France	0	2	1	3
5	Canada	0	1	1	2
6	Italy	0	1	0	1
7	China	0	0	1	1
7	Hungary	0	0	1	1
Totals (8 entries)		8	8	8	24

== Participation details ==
Team	(France) 2010	(Netherlands) 2012	(Czech Republic) 2014	(Spain) 2016	(Belarus) 2018	(Hungary) 2022	(Mexico) 2024	(Czech Republic) 2026	(Indonesia) 2028	Total
Angola	–	–	–	–	16th	–	–	–		1
Argentina	9th	–	–	–	13th	15th	16th	–		4
Australia	7th	5th	5th	1st	3rd	5th	5th	3rd		8
Belarus	–	–	–	–	15th	–	–	–	–	1
Belgium	4th	7th	–	–	–	13th	–	–	–	3
Brazil	–	11th	9th	13th	–	–	–	–		3
Canada	11th	3rd	6th	7th	9th	4th	2nd	4th		8
China	3rd	–	11th	4th	11th	–	–	6th		5
Chinese Taipei	–	–	–	–	–	–	10th	–		1
Colombia	–	–	–	–	14th	–	–	12th		2
Croatia	–	–	–	–	–	–	9th	–		1
Czech Republic	–	–	4th	5th	–	–	–	14th		3
Egypt	–	–	16th	–	–	11th	11th	9th		4
Finland	–	–	–	–	–	–	8th	–	–	1
France	2nd	–	8th	8th	2nd	3rd	4th	–		6
Germany	–	–	–	–	–	7th	–	13th		2
Hungary	–	–	3rd	–	4th	6th	–	–		3
Indonesia	–	–	–	–	–	–	–	–	Q	1
Italy	–	6th	13th	2nd	5th	–	7th	10th	–	6
Ivory Coast	–	–	–	–	–	–		16th		1
Japan	5th	4th	7th	9th	7th	8th	6th	7th		8
Latvia	–	–	–	10th	8th	–	–	11th		3
Mali	12th	10th	12th	11th	10th	10th	13th	–		7
Mexico	–	–	14th	14th	–	16th	15th	15th		5
Netherlands	–	8th	–	–	–	–	–	–	–	1
New Zealand	–	–	–	–	12th	12th	12th	5th		4
Nigeria	–	–	–	DQ	–	–	–	–		1
Portugal	–	–	–	12th	–	–	–	–	–	1
Puerto Rico	–	–	–	–	–	–	14th	–		1
Russia	6th	–	–	–	–	DQ	–	–	–	1
Slovakia	–	–	15th	–	–	–	–	–	–	1
Slovenia	–	–	–	–	–	9th	–	8th		2
South Korea	–	9th	10th	15th	–	14th	–	–		4
Spain	8th	2nd	2nd	6th	6th	2nd	3rd	2nd		8
Turkey	10th	12th	–	–	–	–	–	–		2
United States	1st	1st	1st	3rd	1st	1st	1st	1st		8
Total	12	12	16	16	16	16	16	16	16	

== Tournament awards ==
=== Most recent award winners (2026) ===
Award	Winner	Position	Team
Most Valuable Player	Ivanna Wilson Manyacka	F	United States
All-Tournament Team	Ivanna Wilson Manyacka	F	United States
All-Tournament Team	Madison Ryan	F	Australia
All-Tournament Team	Frances Vollett	F	Canada
All-Tournament Team	Isabel Hernández	G	Spain
All-Tournament Team	Miya Takeuchi	G	Japan

== Debut of national teams ==
Year	Debutants
2010	Argentina, Australia, Belgium, Canada, China, France, Japan; Mali, Russia, Spain, Turkey, United States
2012	Brazil, Italy, Netherlands, South Korea
2014	Czech Republic, Egypt, Hungary, Mexico, Slovakia
2016	Latvia, Portugal, Nigeria (Disqualified)
2018	Angola, Belarus, Colombia, New Zealand
2022	Germany, Slovenia
2024	Chinese Taipei, Croatia, Finland, Puerto Rico
2026	Ivory Coast
2028	Indonesia

== Teams by number of appearances ==
- Teams in **bold** have qualified for the 2026 edition.

Team	App	Record streak	Active streak	Debut	Most recent	Best result (* hosts)
**Australia**	8	8	8	2010	2026	Champions (2016)
**Canada**	8	8	8	2010	2026	Runners-up (2024)
**Japan**	8	8	8	2010	2026	Fourth place (2012)
**Spain**	8	8	8	2010	2026	Runners-up (2012, 2014, 2022, 2026)
**United States**	8	8	8	2010	2026	Champions (2010, 2012, 2014, 2018, 2022, 2024, 2026)
Mali	7	7	7	2010	2024	10th (2012, 2018, 2022)
France	6	5	5	2010	2024	Runners-up (2010*, 2018)
**Italy**	6	4	1	2012	2026	Runners-up (2016)
**Mexico**	5	4	3	2014	2026	14th (2014, 2016)
**China**	5	4	1	2010	2026	Third place (2010)
**New Zealand**	4	4	4	2018	2024	5th (2026)
Argentina	4	3	3	2010	2024	9th (2010)
South Korea	4	3	0	2012	2022	9th (2012)
**Egypt**	4	2	3	2014	2026	9th (2026)
**Latvia**	3	3	1	2016	2018	8th (2018)
Brazil	3	3	0	2012	2016	9th (2014)
**Czech Republic**	3	3	0	2014	2026	Fourth place (2014*)
Belgium	3	2	0	2010	2022	Fourth place (2010)
Hungary	3	2	0	2014	2022	Third place (2014)
**Colombia**	2	2	1	2018	2018	12th (2026)
**Germany**	2	2	1	2022	2026	7th (2022)
**Slovenia**	2	2	1	2022	2026	8th (2026)
Turkey	2	2	0	2010	2012	10th (2010)
Chinese Taipei	1	1	1	2024	2024	10th (2024)
Croatia	1	1	1	2024	2024	9th (2024)
Finland	1	1	1	2024	2024	8th (2024)
Puerto Rico	1	1	1	2024	2024	14th (2024)
**Ivory Coast**	1	1	1	2026	2026	16th (2026)
Indonesia	1	1	1	2028	2028	TBD (2028)
Russia	1	1	0	2010	2010	6th (2010)
Netherlands	1	1	0	2012	2012	8th (2012*)
Slovakia	1	1	0	2014	2014	15th (2014)
Nigeria	1	1	0	2016	2016	dq (2016)
Portugal	1	1	0	2016	2016	12th (2016)
Angola	1	1	0	2018	2018	16th (2018)
Belarus	1	1	0	2018	2018	15th (2018*)

== Overall win–loss record ==
Team	App	Played	Won	Lost	%
United States	8	58	57	1	98.3
Australia	8	57	42	15	71.9
Spain	8	58	38	20	65.5
Canada	8	56	34	22	60.7
Japan	8	57	32	25	56.1
France	6	43	26	17	60.5
Italy	6	43	26	17	60.5
China	5	36	20	16	55.6
Hungary	3	21	16	5	76.2
Belgium	3	23	12	11	52.2
Mali	7	49	12	37	24.5
New Zealand	4	28	11	17	39.3
Brazil	3	20	9	11	45
Argentina	4	28	9	19	32.1
Czech Republic	3	21	9	12	42.9
Slovenia	2	14	8	6	57.1
Egypt	4	28	8	20	28.6
Germany	2	14	7	7	50
Latvia	3	20	7	13	35
South Korea	4	27	6	21	22.2
Netherlands	1	8	4	4	50
Croatia	1	7	4	3	57.1
Mexico	5	35	4	31	11.4
Chinese Taipei	1	7	3	4	42.9
Russia	1	8	3	5	37.5
Colombia	2	14	3	11	21.4
Turkey	2	14	3	11	21.4
Belarus	1	7	2	5	28.6
Finland	1	7	2	5	28.6
Slovakia	1	7	2	5	28.6
Portugal	1	6	1	5	16.7
Puerto Rico	1	7	1	6	14.3
Angola	1	7	0	7	0
Ivory Coast	1	7	0	7	0
Nigeria	1	0	0	0	—

== See also ==
- FIBA Under-19 Women's Basketball World Cup
- FIBA Under-17 Basketball World Cup
- FIBA Under-19 Basketball World Cup
