= 2024 FIBA Under-17 Women's Basketball World Cup squads =

This article shows the rosters of all participating teams at the 2024 FIBA Under-17 Women's Basketball World Cup in Mexico.

== Group A ==
=== Argentina ===
The final squad was announced on 8 July 2024.

Argentina women's national under-17 basketball team roster
Players
Coaches

Pos.	No.	Name	Age – Date of birth	Height	Club
C	2	Isabella Boullón	16 – 2 December 2007	1.81 m (5 ft 11 in)	(Argentina) Obras Sanitarias
C	5	Abril Ochoa	16 – 30 August 2007	1.90 m (6 ft 3 in)	(Argentina) El Coatí
SG	6	Abril Fernández	17 – 22 January 2007	1.69 m (5 ft 7 in)	(Argentina) Lanús
PG	7	Juana Barrionuevo	17 – 24 January 2007	1.63 m (5 ft 4 in)	(Argentina) Ameghino
PG	8	Sofía Novoa Ferrari	15 – 25 July 2008	1.74 m (5 ft 9 in)	(Argentina) Vélez Sarsfield
C	9	Isabella Roldán	15 – 25 June 2009	1.85 m (6 ft 1 in)	(Argentina) 9 de Julio
SG	10	Fiamma Solis	17 – 26 February 2007	1.72 m (5 ft 8 in)	(Argentina) Obras Sanitarias
SG	11	Sol Depetris	17 – 23 March 2007	1.70 m (5 ft 7 in)	(Argentina) Unión Florida
PF	12	Renata Scordo	15 – 17 October 2008	1.85 m (6 ft 1 in)	(Argentina) Obras Sanitarias
SG	14	Isabella Ingenito	16 – 5 September 2007	1.75 m (5 ft 9 in)	(Argentina) San Salvatore Selarguis
PF	15	Milagros Morell	17 – 27 April 2007	1.91 m (6 ft 3 in)	(Argentina) Obras Sanitarias
C	18	Francisca Canello	15 – 24 February 2009	1.82 m (6 ft 0 in)	(Argentina) Obras Sanitarias

Head coach

Paula Budini

Assistant coach(es)

Laura González
Mariano Marcos

=== Finland ===
The final squad was announced on 5 July 2024.

Finland women's national under-17 basketball team roster
Players
Coaches

Pos.	No.	Name	Age – Date of birth	Height	Club
PG	3	Erika Mace	16 – 31 July 2007	1.73 m (5 ft 8 in)	(Finland) Espoo Basket Team
SG	4	Heli Lehto	17 – 6 March 2007	1.74 m (5 ft 9 in)	(Finland) Tapiolan Honka
PG	5	Tiia Talonen	16 – 11 August 2007	1.75 m (5 ft 9 in)	(Finland) Feeniks Basket
SG	7	Nicole Pihamaa	17 – 2 May 2007	1.78 m (5 ft 10 in)	(Finland) Tapiolan Honka
SF	9	Eevi Seppä	16 – 27 October 2007	1.84 m (6 ft 0 in)	(Finland) Pirkkalan Viri
SF	10	Lilli Laine	17 – 13 February 2007	1.78 m (5 ft 10 in)	(Finland) Tapiolan Honka
F	11	Silja Loukola	17 – 16 April 2007	1.88 m (6 ft 2 in)	(Finland) Espoo Basket Team
G	12	Ada Luukkanen	17 – 18 January 2007	1.76 m (5 ft 9 in)	(Finland) NMKY Helsinki
SG	14	Iida Riihelä	16 – 26 August 2007	1.77 m (5 ft 10 in)	(Finland) BC Nokia
PF	15	Nicole Ogun	17 – 25 May 2007	1.83 m (6 ft 0 in)	(Finland) Espoo Basket Team
C	20	Eevi Haveri	17 – 8 June 2007	1.87 m (6 ft 2 in)	(Finland) NMKY Helsinki
SF	21	Anna Gardziella	16 – 17 March 2008	1.83 m (6 ft 0 in)	(Finland) ToPo Juniorit

Head coach

Jussi Räikkä

Assistant coach(es)

Ray Ailus
Susanna Strömberg

=== Japan ===
The final squad was announced on 8 July 2024.

Japan women's national under-17 basketball team roster
Players
Coaches

Pos.	No.	Name	Age – Date of birth	Height	Club
C	6	Arisa Ihara	16 – 11 March 2008	1.80 m (5 ft 11 in)	Japan Aviation HS
SF	7	Otoha Goto	17 – 13 February 2007	1.78 m (5 ft 10 in)	(Japan) Hamamatsu Kaiseikan HS
PG	12	Nanano Hamada	16 – 27 September 2007	1.60 m (5 ft 3 in)	(Japan) Ohka Gakuen HS
C	18	Kokona Suzuki	17 – 11 July 2007	1.78 m (5 ft 10 in)	(Japan) Wakaba HS
C	23	Erena Yamashita	17 – 2 February 2007	1.80 m (5 ft 11 in)	(Japan) Showa Gakuin HS
F	25	Yuina Sugiura	16 – 25 October 2007	1.72 m (5 ft 8 in)	(Japan) Gifu Girls' HS
F	27	Yuna Abe	17 – 12 March 2007	1.75 m (5 ft 9 in)	(Japan) Seiwa Gakuen HS
F	30	Yui Seito	17 – 22 January 2007	1.74 m (5 ft 9 in)	(Japan) Seika Girls' HS
PG	51	Sara Yamada	17 – 10 May 2007	1.60 m (5 ft 3 in)	(Japan) Ohka Gakuen HS
F	59	Anna Ishii	16 – 20 February 2008	1.75 m (5 ft 9 in)	(Japan) Showa Gakuin HS
G	66	Rui Makino	17 – 13 February 2007	1.65 m (5 ft 5 in)	(Japan) Chiba Keizai University HS
PF	72	Mahiro Iwasaka	17 – 4 April 2007	1.76 m (5 ft 9 in)	(Japan) Tsuchiura Nihon University HS

Head coach

Natsumi Yabuuchi

Assistant coach(es)

Masataka Mishima
Ai Inagaki

=== Spain ===
The final squad was announced on 12 July 2024.

Spain women's national under-17 basketball team roster
Players
Coaches

Pos.	No.	Name	Age – Date of birth	Height	Club
PG	5	Aina Cargol	16 – 15 December 2007	1.74 m (5 ft 9 in)	(Spain) Bàsquet Girona
PG	6	Gina García	17 – 2 April 2007	1.74 m (5 ft 9 in)	(Spain) Siglo XXI
PG	7	Elena Álvarez	17 – 1 May 2007	1.73 m (5 ft 8 in)	(Spain) Megacalzado Ardoi
G	8	Mireia Jurado	17 – 1 January 2007	1.83 m (6 ft 0 in)	(Spain) Siglo XXI
SG	9	Mireya Sanz	17 – 26 March 2007	1.79 m (5 ft 10 in)	(Spain) Torrelodones BT
SF	10	Inés García	16 – 24 September 2007	1.87 m (6 ft 2 in)	(Spain) Siglo XXI
PF	11	Xenia Salzmann	17 – 3 April 2007	1.88 m (6 ft 2 in)	(Spain) Barça CBS
F	12	Leyre Urdiain	17 – 5 April 2007	1.80 m (5 ft 11 in)	(Spain) Basket Zaragoza
PF	14	Noelia Mouriño	17 – 29 March 2007	1.89 m (6 ft 2 in)	(Spain) Siglo XXI
C	15	Nicole Domínguez	17 – 29 March 2007	2.06 m (6 ft 9 in)	(Spain) Siglo XXI
C	16	Adriana Díaz	16 – 9 April 2008	1.83 m (6 ft 0 in)	(Spain) Estudiantes
C	17	Sara Okeke	16 – 16 November 2007	1.93 m (6 ft 4 in)	(Spain) Estudiantes

Head coach

Javier Torralba

Assistant coach(es)

Mireia Capdevila
David Gallego

== Group B ==
=== Italy ===
The final squad was announced on 8 July 2024.

Italy women's national under-17 basketball team roster
Players
Coaches

Pos.	No.	Name	Age – Date of birth	Height	Club
PG	4	Emma Giacchetti	17 – 18 March 2007	1.78 m (5 ft 10 in)	(Italy) Magnolia Campobasso
F	6	Sveva Bernasconi	16 – 14 July 2007	1.82 m (6 ft 0 in)	(Italy) Basket Costa
G	7	Olivia Ostoni	17 – 13 May 2007	1.75 m (5 ft 9 in)	(Italy) Geas Basket
G	8	Francesca Baldassarre	16 – 15 January 2008	1.75 m (5 ft 9 in)	(Italy) Cestistica Spezzina
G	10	Giorgia Gorini	17 – 27 January 2007	1.70 m (5 ft 7 in)	(Italy) Basket Costa
F	11	Isabel Hassan	15 – 14 June 2009	1.82 m (6 ft 0 in)	(Italy) Reyer Venezia
F	12	Beatrice Cerè	17 – 31 March 2007	1.82 m (6 ft 0 in)	(Italy) Reyer Venezia
SF	13	Emma Volpato	17 – 24 January 2007	1.81 m (5 ft 11 in)	(Italy) Geas Basket
C	14	Emma D'Este	16 – 5 August 2007	1.92 m (6 ft 4 in)	(Italy) Reyer Venezia
F	16	Nicole Torresani	16 – 2 August 2007	1.78 m (5 ft 10 in)	(Luxembourg) Sparta Bertrange
F	19	Ilaria Cavazzuti	17 – 23 January 2007	1.81 m (5 ft 11 in)	(Italy) Parma Basket Project
C	20	Marianna Zanetti	16 – 12 February 2008	1.89 m (6 ft 2 in)	(Italy) PF Schio

Head coach

Giovanni Lucchesi

Assistant coach(es)

Fabio Frignani
Angela Gianolla

=== Mali ===
The final squad was announced on 13 July 2024.

Mali women's national under-17 basketball team roster
Players
Coaches

Pos.	No.	Name	Age – Date of birth	Height	Club
PG	00	Tenin Diarra	16 – 17 August 2007	1.75 m (5 ft 9 in)
C	0	Nana Ndiaye	16 – 11 February 2008	1.82 m (6 ft 0 in)
G	1	Awa Bathé	15 – 24 October 2008	1.71 m (5 ft 7 in)
C	2	Assan Mariko	15 – 16 November 2008	1.80 m (5 ft 11 in)
PG	4	Couda Keïta	16 – 11 April 2008	1.70 m (5 ft 7 in)
PG	5	Maimouna Traoré	15 – 19 November 2008	1.67 m (5 ft 6 in)
PG	9	Suzane Dembélé	16 – 1 May 2008	1.72 m (5 ft 8 in)
G	10	Assitan Diarriso	15 – 17 November 2008	1.75 m (5 ft 9 in)
PG	11	Mariam Samaké	17 – 1 January 2007	1.65 m (5 ft 5 in)
C	24	Aminata Samaké	15 – 24 December 2008	1.85 m (6 ft 1 in)
C	34	Hatoumata Singaré	15 – 27 August 2008	1.86 m (6 ft 1 in)
PG	66	Oumou Ouattara	17 – 6 January 2007	1.71 m (5 ft 7 in)

Head coach

Moussa Dao

Assistant coach(es)

Badra Traoré
Ndiaye Assetou

=== Mexico ===
The final squad was announced on 9 July 2024.

Mexico women's national under-17 basketball team roster
Players
Coaches

Pos.	No.	Name	Age – Date of birth	Height	Club
G	1	Carol Enríquez	17 – 7 June 2007	1.73 m (5 ft 8 in)	(Mexico) Chihuahua
PF	2	Alex Le Barón	17 – 24 May 2007	1.81 m (5 ft 11 in)	(Mexico) Chihuahua
G	5	Naomi Guzman	17 – 2 June 2007	1.65 m (5 ft 5 in)	(Mexico) Guerrero
G	7	María Romero	17 – 7 February 2007	1.69 m (5 ft 7 in)	(Mexico) Ciudad de México
PF	8	Lucero Ochoa	17 – 3 June 2007	1.80 m (5 ft 11 in)	(Mexico) Chihuahua
G	9	Alexa Olalde	17 – 2 April 2007	1.73 m (5 ft 8 in)	(Mexico) Guanajuato
PF	10	Anna Medina	16 – 29 August 2007	1.81 m (5 ft 11 in)	(Mexico) Baja California
PG	11	Sofia Acuña	16 – 8 December 2007	1.76 m (5 ft 9 in)	(Mexico) Nuevo León
PF	14	Miranda Henry	17 – 17 February 2007	1.84 m (6 ft 0 in)	(Mexico) Jalisco
C	17	Mariant Castillo	17 – 4 January 2007	1.82 m (6 ft 0 in)	(Mexico) Sonora
G	18	Antonina Almazán	16 – 18 August 2007	1.67 m (5 ft 6 in)	(Mexico) Yucatan
PF	23	Giovanna Molinar	16 – 25 August 2007	1.81 m (5 ft 11 in)	(Mexico) Sonora

Head coach

Efrain Acuña

Assistant coach(es)

Carlos Tosado
Erica Routt

=== New Zealand ===
The final squad was announced on 16 May 2024.

New Zealand women's national under-17 basketball team roster
Players
Coaches

Pos.	No.	Name	Age – Date of birth	Height	Club
F	0	Kodee Sefo	17 – 1 February 2007	1.80 m (5 ft 11 in)	(New Zealand) Harbour Basketball
G	1	Keriana-Marie Hippolite	17 – 15 April 2007	1.68 m (5 ft 6 in)	(Australia) Brisbane Capitals
G	3	Bailey Flavell	17 – 15 February 2007	1.78 m (5 ft 10 in)	(Australia) Harbour Basketball
PG	4	Pahlyss Hokianga	16 – 9 October 2007	1.66 m (5 ft 5 in)	(New Zealand) Hawke's Bay Hawks
PG	5	Cassidy Thomson	17 – 21 May 2007	1.68 m (5 ft 6 in)	(Australia) Manly Warringah Basketball
F	7	Sophia Hickey	16 – 22 October 2007	1.87 m (6 ft 2 in)	(United States) DME Academy
G	8	Rica Enriquez	16 – 26 November 2007	1.69 m (5 ft 7 in)	(Australia) Gold Coast Rollers
F	12	Graecyn Parahi	16 – 7 November 2007	1.80 m (5 ft 11 in)	(New Zealand) Basketball Hawkes Bay
F	14	Gia Vukona	16 – 18 June 2008	1.83 m (6 ft 0 in)	(Australia) Southern District Spartans
G	24	Taia McMechan	16 – 29 March 2008	1.70 m (5 ft 7 in)	(Australia) Nunawading Spectres
F	41	Waikimihia Douglas-Karauna	17 – 15 June 2007	1.75 m (5 ft 9 in)	(New Zealand) Rotorua Basketball
F	96	Olivia Hastings	16 – 9 February 2008	1.90 m (6 ft 3 in)	(Australia) Norths Bears

Head coach

Melanie Bennett

Assistant coach(es)

Igor Cvjetković
Sarah Molisa

== Group C ==
=== Australia ===
The final squad was announced on 22 May 2024.

Australia women's national under-17 basketball team roster
Players
Coaches

Pos.	No.	Name	Age – Date of birth	Height	Club
G	1	Emilija Dakic	17 – 6 February 2007	1.78 m (5 ft 10 in)	(Australia) Centre of Excellence
F	2	Sitaya Fagan	16 – 24 March 2008	1.89 m (6 ft 2 in)	(Australia) Centre of Excellence
C	4	Lara Somfai	17 – 28 March 2007	1.92 m (6 ft 4 in)	(Australia) Centre of Excellence
F	7	Prasayus Notoa	16 – 20 August 2007	1.83 m (6 ft 0 in)	(Australia) Queensland
F	9	Zara Russell	17 – 23 June 2007	1.85 m (6 ft 1 in)	(Australia) Centre of Excellence
C	10	Jade Crook	17 – 7 March 2007	1.91 m (6 ft 3 in)	(Australia) Centre of Excellence
SF	11	Madison Ryan	15 – 31 March 2009	1.85 m (6 ft 1 in)	(Australia) Victoria
F	14	Sienna Lehmann	17 – 11 June 2007	1.72 m (5 ft 8 in)	(Australia) Centre of Excellence
F	16	Erica Finney	17 – 22 January 2007	1.86 m (6 ft 1 in)	(Australia) New South Wales
F	17	Emma Petrie	16 – 12 September 2007	1.85 m (6 ft 1 in)	(Australia) Queensland
G	22	Ruby Perkins	16 – 21 November 2007	1.72 m (5 ft 8 in)	(Australia) New South Wales
C	30	Zoe Jackson	16 – 5 August 2007	1.93 m (6 ft 4 in)	(Australia) New South Wales

Head coach

Thomas Garlepp

Assistant coach(es)

Sarah Graham
Nicholas Martin

=== Croatia ===
The final squad was announced on 10 July 2024.

Croatia women's national under-17 basketball team roster
Players
Coaches

Pos.	No.	Name	Age – Date of birth	Height	Club
PG	2	Katja Bakalar	16 – 2 November 2007	1.81 m (5 ft 11 in)	(Bosnia and Herzegovina) Zrinjski Mostar
SF	3	Iva Ćorluka	16 – 22 July 2007	1.84 m (6 ft 0 in)	(United States) Team Lightning Melious
SF	4	Marija Rozić	17 – 4 March 2007	1.82 m (6 ft 0 in)	(Croatia) Ragusa
PG	6	Hana Arnautović	17 – 9 June 2007	1.74 m (5 ft 9 in)	(Croatia) Zagreb
SG	7	Ana Pavić	16 – 6 August 2007	1.75 m (5 ft 9 in)	(Croatia) Akademija Žana Lelas
G	8	Lola Stipić	16 – 24 April 2008	1.70 m (5 ft 7 in)	(Croatia) Zadar
SF	9	Lena Bilić	17 – 2 May 2007	1.88 m (6 ft 2 in)	(Croatia) Trešnjevka 2009
G	10	Mia Ratković	17 – 8 April 2007	1.74 m (5 ft 9 in)	(Croatia) BC FSV
PF	11	Lea Vukić	16 – 9 August 2007	1.83 m (6 ft 0 in)	(Croatia) Trešnjevka 2009
SF	12	Nika Gažić	16 – 7 May 2008	1.87 m (6 ft 2 in)	(Croatia) Zagreb
PF	14	Lori Zlatoper	16 – 15 February 2008	1.85 m (6 ft 1 in)	(Croatia) Trešnjevka 2009
PF	15	Olivia Vukoša	15 – 7 September 2008	1.94 m (6 ft 4 in)	(United States) Christ the King Regional HS

Head coach

Tatjana Jacović

Assistant coach(es)

Ivan Bais
Miljan Vorkapić

=== Puerto Rico ===
The final squad was announced on 13 July 2024.

Puerto Rico women's national under-17 basketball team roster
Players
Coaches

Pos.	No.	Name	Age – Date of birth	Height	Club
PG	00	Alanis Iturrino	17 – 16 January 2007	1.65 m (5 ft 5 in)	(Puerto Rico) NW Bilingual Academy
C	0	Teresa del Río	17 – 29 January 2007	1.82 m (6 ft 0 in)	(Puerto Rico) University Gardens
SG	1	Jaida Guerra	16 – 20 July 2007	1.67 m (5 ft 6 in)	(United States) Bryant University
C	3	Niurka Mirambeaux	17 – 15 June 2007	1.88 m (6 ft 2 in)	(Puerto Rico) ECEDAO
SG	5	Walushka Hodge	16 – 6 June 2008	1.64 m (5 ft 5 in)	(Puerto Rico) St. Francis School
C	8	Jaely De León	15 – 1 September 2008	1.80 m (5 ft 11 in)	(Puerto Rico) Colegio San Conrado
SF	10	Lucianna Parrotta	15 – 17 May 2009	1.83 m (6 ft 0 in)	(United States) Convent of the Sacred Heart
C	12	Natalia Centeno	16 – 12 March 2008	1.85 m (6 ft 1 in)	(United States) ECEDAO
SG	13	Mia Canales	16 – 23 July 2007	1.70 m (5 ft 7 in)	(Puerto Rico) Colegio Adianez
PG	16	Adriana Robles	17 – 6 June 2007	1.71 m (5 ft 7 in)	(United States) Fossil Ridge High School
C	21	Diann Jackson	17 – 18 April 2007	1.88 m (6 ft 2 in)	(United States) Kenwood Academy
SG	23	Desirek Nieves	17 – 15 March 2007	1.70 m (5 ft 7 in)	(Puerto Rico) St. Francis School

Head coach

Michelle González

Assistant coach(es)

Roberto Canada
Glenda Negron

=== United States ===
The final squad was announced on 27 May 2024.

United States women's national under-17 basketball team roster
Players
Coaches

Pos.	No.	Name	Age – Date of birth	Height	Club
G	4	Addison Bjorn	16 – 8 August 2007	1.85 m (6 ft 1 in)	(United States) Park Hill South HS
G	5	Jerzy Robinson	15 – 11 September 2008	1.85 m (6 ft 1 in)	(United States) Sierra Canyon School
G	6	Hailee Swain	17 – 17 March 2007	1.75 m (5 ft 9 in)	(United States) Holy Innocents' Episcopal School
G	7	Emilee Skinner	17 – 12 March 2007	1.83 m (6 ft 0 in)	(United States) Ridgeline HS
F	8	Ivanna Wilson Manyacka	15 – 26 May 2009	1.85 m (6 ft 1 in)	(United States) Bullis School
F	9	Jordyn Palmer	15 – 6 November 2008	1.85 m (6 ft 1 in)	(United States) Westtown School
F	10	Alexandra Eschmeyer	17 – 4 March 2007	1.96 m (6 ft 5 in)	(United States) Peak to Peak Charter School
G	11	Lanie Grant	17 – 23 April 2007	1.75 m (5 ft 9 in)	(United States) James River HS
G	12	Jacy Abii	16 – 27 December 2007	1.85 m (6 ft 1 in)	(United States) Liberty HS
F	13	McKenna Woliczko	16 – 12 May 2008	1.88 m (6 ft 2 in)	(United States) Archbishop Mitty HS
F	14	Lola Lampley	16 – 24 October 2007	1.88 m (6 ft 2 in)	(United States) Lawrence Central HS
C	15	Kelsi Andrews	16 – 26 January 2008	1.90 m (6 ft 3 in)	(United States) Hazel Green HS

Head coach

Meg Barber

Assistant coach(es)

Trenia Tillis-Hoard
Barbara Cabrey

== Group D ==
=== Canada ===
The final squad was announced on 5 July 2024.

Canada women's national under-17 basketball team roster
Players
Coaches

Pos.	No.	Name	Age – Date of birth	Height	Club
G	0	Jahda Denis	17 – 19 January 2007	1.68 m (5 ft 6 in)	(Canada) Capital Courts Academy
SG	1	Agot Makeer	17 – 4 May 2007	1.85 m (6 ft 1 in)	Canada Basketball
F	2	Yohana Fami	16 – 12 May 2008	1.84 m (6 ft 0 in)	(Canada) Royal Crown
G	3	Chance Berry	15 – 6 January 2009	1.76 m (5 ft 9 in)	(Canada) Royal Crown
F	7	Avery Arije	15 – 12 February 2009	1.80 m (5 ft 11 in)	(Canada) Excel Hoops Prep
F	8	Savannah Swords	16 – 18 January 2008	1.83 m (6 ft 0 in)	(United States) Long Island Lutheran
F	17	Brooke McLeod	16 – 22 January 2008	1.84 m (6 ft 0 in)	(Canada) Crestwood Preparatory College
F	21	Rachael Okokoh	17 – 2 May 2007	1.87 m (6 ft 2 in)	(Canada) Capital Courts Academy
F	22	Emilia Krstevski	16 – 22 January 2008	1.90 m (6 ft 3 in)	(United States) Sierra Canyon School
F	23	Jordyn Wheeler	16 – 11 May 2008	1.80 m (5 ft 11 in)	(Canada) Niagara Prep
G	25	Deniya Prawl	17 – 25 April 2007	1.82 m (6 ft 0 in)	(Canada) Fort Erie International Academy
F	30	Cearah Parchment	17 – 4 July 2007	1.85 m (6 ft 1 in)	(Canada) Fort Erie International Academy

Head coach

Fabienne Blizzard

Assistant coach(es)

Isabel Ormond
Dianna Ros

=== Chinese Taipei ===
The final squad was announced on 9 July 2024.

Chinese Taipei women's national under-17 basketball team roster
Players
Coaches

Pos.	No.	Name	Age – Date of birth	Height	Club
C	2	Wang Jo-yen	16 – 11 November 2007	1.75 m (5 ft 9 in)	(Chinese Taipei) Taipei First Girls' HS
SF	3	Hung Yu-syuan	15 – 10 December 2008	1.66 m (5 ft 5 in)	(Chinese Taipei) Taipei Municipal Minzu Experimental HS
SF	5	Wu Hsin-ying	16 – 29 September 2007	1.65 m (5 ft 5 in)	(Chinese Taipei) Taipei First Girls' HS
PG	6	Peng Yu-chen	16 – 11 January 2008	1.60 m (5 ft 3 in)	(Chinese Taipei) Taipei First Girls' HS
PG	8	Chen Zih-chen	16 – 22 November 2007	1.61 m (5 ft 3 in)	(Chinese Taipei) Taipei First Girls' HS
PF	10	Chang Shan-chu	16 – 21 December 2007	1.72 m (5 ft 8 in)	(Chinese Taipei) Taipei First Girls' HS
PF	11	Lin Yu-han	17 – 3 July 2007	1.73 m (5 ft 8 in)	(Chinese Taipei) Jinou Girls' HS
SF	13	Yeh Yu-hsuan	17 – 4 June 2007	1.67 m (5 ft 6 in)	(Chinese Taipei) Private NanShan Senior HS
C	14	Yang Tsai-hsuan	17 – 14 April 2007	1.76 m (5 ft 9 in)	(Chinese Taipei) YongRen HS
C	15	Hsu Yu-shan	16 – 25 April 2008	1.77 m (5 ft 10 in)	(Chinese Taipei) Taipei Municipal Yangming HS
C	16	Hsu Yu-ting	17 – 9 May 2007	1.74 m (5 ft 9 in)	(Chinese Taipei) Taipei Municipal Nanhu Senior HS
F	24	Pan Chen-chia-shan	16 – 24 July 2007	1.74 m (5 ft 9 in)	(Chinese Taipei) Taipei First Girls' HS

Head coach

Hsu Hsiu-mien

Assistant coach(es)

Liu Chun-yi

=== Egypt ===
The final squad was announced on 8 July 2024.

Egypt women's national under-17 basketball team roster
Players
Coaches

Pos.	No.	Name	Age – Date of birth	Height	Club
SF	2	Joudy El-Baz	16 – 2 February 2008	1.80 m (5 ft 11 in)	(Egypt) Al Ahly
PG	6	Mariam El-Gendy	16 – 23 September 2007	1.71 m (5 ft 7 in)	(Egypt) Al Ahly
PF	8	Yasmin Ahmed	16 – 8 February 2008	1.80 m (5 ft 11 in)	(Egypt) Smouha
PG	10	Hana El-Goly	17 – 24 June 2007	1.67 m (5 ft 6 in)	(Egypt) Egyptian Shooting
C	15	Khadiga Abouelghait	17 – 1 March 2007	1.90 m (6 ft 3 in)	(Egypt) Gezira
C	16	Mariam El-Shenawy	15 – 1 January 2009	1.83 m (6 ft 0 in)	(Egypt) Al Ahly
C	19	Malak El-Hemaly	16 – 15 January 2008	1.81 m (5 ft 11 in)	(Egypt) Egyptian Shooting
PF	22	Hana El-Baz	16 – 2 February 2008	1.80 m (5 ft 11 in)	(Egypt) Al Ahly
SF	23	Hala El-Wakil	16 – 5 September 2007	1.77 m (5 ft 10 in)	(Egypt) Sporting
G	24	Joudi El-Sayed	15 – 13 April 2009	1.82 m (6 ft 0 in)	(Egypt) Smouha
SG	30	Haya Al-Halawany	16 – 24 July 2007	1.70 m (5 ft 7 in)	(Egypt) Smouha
PG	35	Sadil Hadhouda	15 – 5 September 2008	1.70 m (5 ft 7 in)	(Egypt) Al Ittihad

Head coach

Emadeldin El-Sayed

Assistant coach(es)

Hani Mahmoud
Nehal El-Damhogy
Mahmoud Younes

=== France ===
The final squad was announced on 13 July 2024.

France women's national under-17 basketball team roster
Players
Coaches

Pos.	No.	Name	Age – Date of birth	Height	Club
SG	2	Chloé Rousselière	17 – 17 April 2007	1.78 m (5 ft 10 in)	(France) Bourges
G	4	Manon Simplot	17 – 28 June 2007	1.64 m (5 ft 5 in)	Pôle France
G	5	Talia Kavoka	16 – 23 November 2007	1.68 m (5 ft 6 in)	(France) Basket Lattes Montpellier
G	8	Emma Broliron	15 – 4 December 2008	1.67 m (5 ft 6 in)	Pôle France
SG	10	Ainhoa Risacher	17 – 13 July 2007	1.87 m (6 ft 2 in)	(France) ASVEL Féminin
PF	11	Lana Bentoumi	17 – 22 February 2007	1.84 m (6 ft 0 in)	(France) ASVEL Féminin
C	13	Alicia Tournebize	16 – 21 July 2007	1.92 m (6 ft 4 in)	(France) Bourges
SF	14	Justine Loubens	17 – 27 June 2007	1.86 m (6 ft 1 in)	Pôle France
PF	17	Kathy-Emma Otto	16 – 1 April 2008	1.87 m (6 ft 2 in)	Pôle France
C	19	Sarah Cisse	17 – 26 January 2007	1.89 m (6 ft 2 in)	Pôle France
C	23	Claire Dalstra	17 – 23 March 2007	1.97 m (6 ft 6 in)	(France) Charnay
SG	33	Maewenn Poilve	16 – 4 December 2007	1.79 m (5 ft 10 in)	(France) Bourges

Head coach

Arnaud Guppillotte

Assistant coach(es)

Christophe Pontcharraud
Priscilla Roger
