= Sword (disambiguation) =

A sword is a cutting or thrusting weapon.

Sword, Swords, or The Sword may also refer to:

== Places ==
- Swords, County Dublin, a large suburban town outside Irish capital
- Swords, Georgia, a community in the United States
- Sword Beach, code name for the Normandy Coast landing area on D-day in World War II

== Arts, media, and entertainment ==
=== Film and television ===
- Swords (TV series), a documentary TV series on the Discovery Channel
- The Sword (1980 film), a 1980 film by Patrick Tam Kar-Ming
- Ken (film), a 1964 Japanese film also known as The Sword
- Talvar (film), a 2015 Indian film by Meghna Gulzar, also known as Sword
- "The Sword", an episode of the DiC cartoon G.I. Joe: A Real American Hero
- Sword Brave, a fictional character from Brave Animated Series by Yellow Book
- The Sword: Rebirth of the Red Wolf, a 2027 historical film by Kim Han-min

=== Literature ===
- S.W.O.R.D., a fictional counterterrorism and intelligence agency in Marvel Comics
- S.W.O.R.D. (The Saint), a fictional criminal organization in the novel The Saint and the Fiction Makers
- The Sword (magazine), the magazine of the British Fencing Association
- The Sword (comics), a comic book series from the Luna Brothers
- HMS Sword, a fictional submarine in Jules Verne's novel Facing the Flag
- The Sword, a novel by Deborah Chester

=== Music ===
- Sword (band), a Canadian heavy metal band
- Swords (band), an indie rock band
- The Sword, an American heavy metal band
- Swords (album), a compilation album of b-sides from Morrissey's studio releases
- "Swords" (Leftfield song), 2000
- "Swords" (M.I.A. song), 2016
- "Sword" (song), by Wisp, 2025
- "SWORD", a 2025 track by Toby Fox from Deltarune Chapters 3+4 OST from the video game Deltarune

=== Other media ===
- The SWORD Project, the CrossWire Bible Society's Bible software project
- Sword, an opponent in the video game Yie Ar Kung-Fu
- TheSword.com, a gay news and lifestyle website
- Swords, a 2010 first-person fighting Wii game
- Pokémon Sword, one of the two paired Pokémon Sword and Shield games for the Nintendo Switch

== Business and technology ==
- SWORD (protocol), a network storage protocol
- SWORDS, a ground-based military robot
- SWORD-financing, a special form of raising capital

== Other uses ==
- Swords, another name for Odds and evens (hand game)
- The Sword (public house), a pub in Gloucester, England
- The Sword of Moses, an apocryphal book of magic
- Suit of swords, a suit in Latin-suited playing cards and Tarot decks
- HMS Sword (F145), a proposed ship of the Royal Navy

== People with the name ==
- Carolyn Swords (born 1989), American basketball player
- Kevin Swords (born 1960), American rugby player
- Kyle Swords (born 1974), American soccer player
- Sam Sword (born 1974), American football player
- Savvy Swords (born 2008), Canadian basketball player
- Shawn Swords (born 1973), Canadian basketball coach
- Syla Swords (born 2006), Canadian basketball player
- Tommy Sword (born 1957), British football player
- William Swords (1942–2007), Irish archer

== See also ==
- SORD
- Sord M5
- Crossed Swords (disambiguation)
