= Registered battlefield =

Protected historic sites in the UK

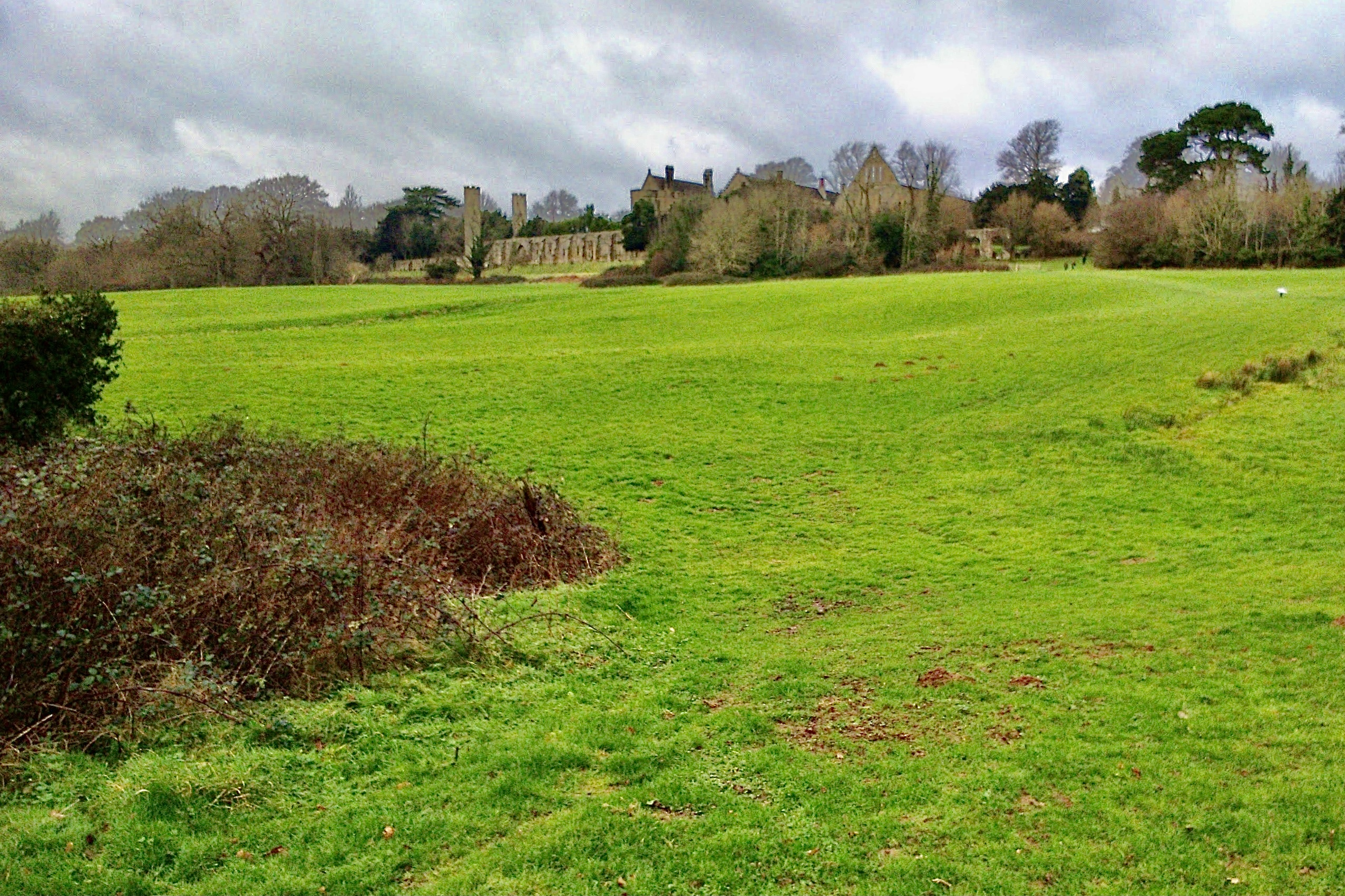
Battlefield of the Battle of Hastings (1066) near Battle, East Sussex in England

Registered battlefields in the UK are battlefields recognised as having specific historic or cultural significance. They are recognised as such by conservationist organisations for a variety of reasons, including protecting them from development that may threaten historic buildings, items, or topography. The history relating to them is often hard to unravel, as there is often little to see above ground and the historical record is often biased in favour of the victors. The UK has many historic battlefield sites, some of which have legal protection through heritage protection legislation (as scheduled monuments, listed buildings, gardens and designed landscapes, or as conservation areas) whilst others are protected through landscape legislation (such as National Parks, National Scenic Areas and areas designated for local landscape value). More recently, some archaeologists prefer the term "site of conflict" to "battlefield", because of the difficulty in defining the geographical extent of a site.

In England, the Register of Historic Battlefields lists the sites of 43 of the most important military battles on English soil. It was set up by English Heritage and since the organisations split it has been managed by Historic England as part of the National Heritage List for England. Historic Environment Scotland is responsible for the Inventory of Historic Battlefields in Scotland. There are currently 40 battlefields on the Inventory. In Wales, the Welsh Ministers proposed in March 2011 that Cadw also compiles a non-statutory register of historic battlefields. The consultation period ends on 10 June 2011. There is currently no battlefield register or statutory protection for such sites in Northern Ireland.

== Legislation ==
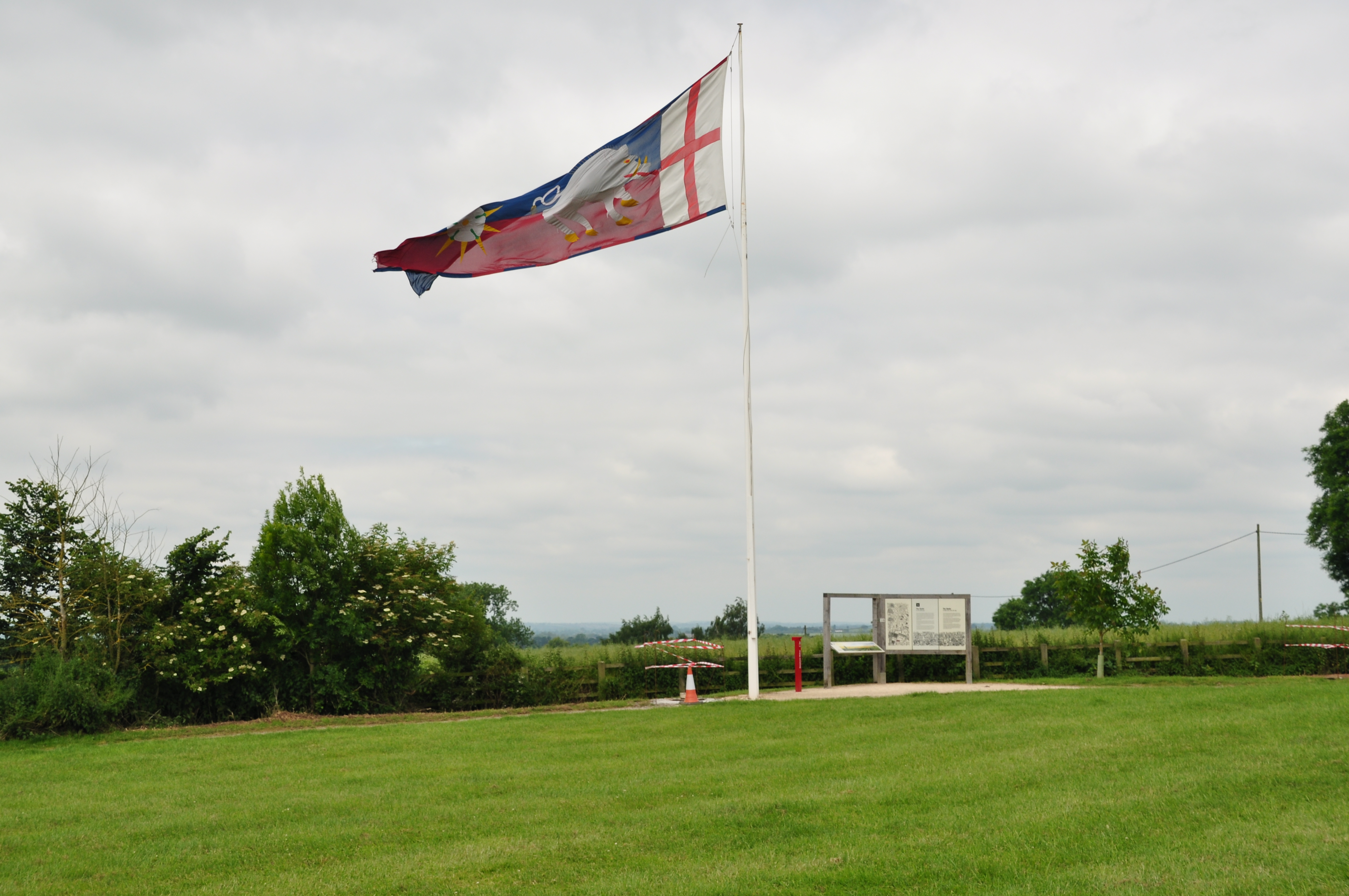
Memorial to the Battle of Bosworth (1485) near Market Bosworth, Leicestershire in England

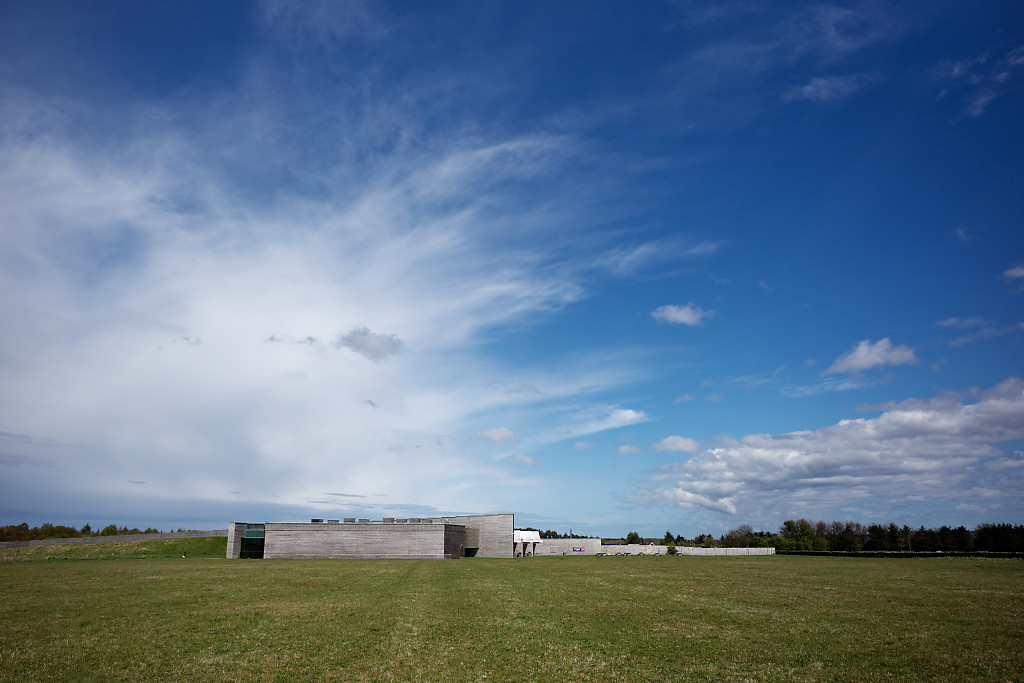
Visitors' centre at the Culloden Battlefield (1746) at Culloden, Highland in Scotland

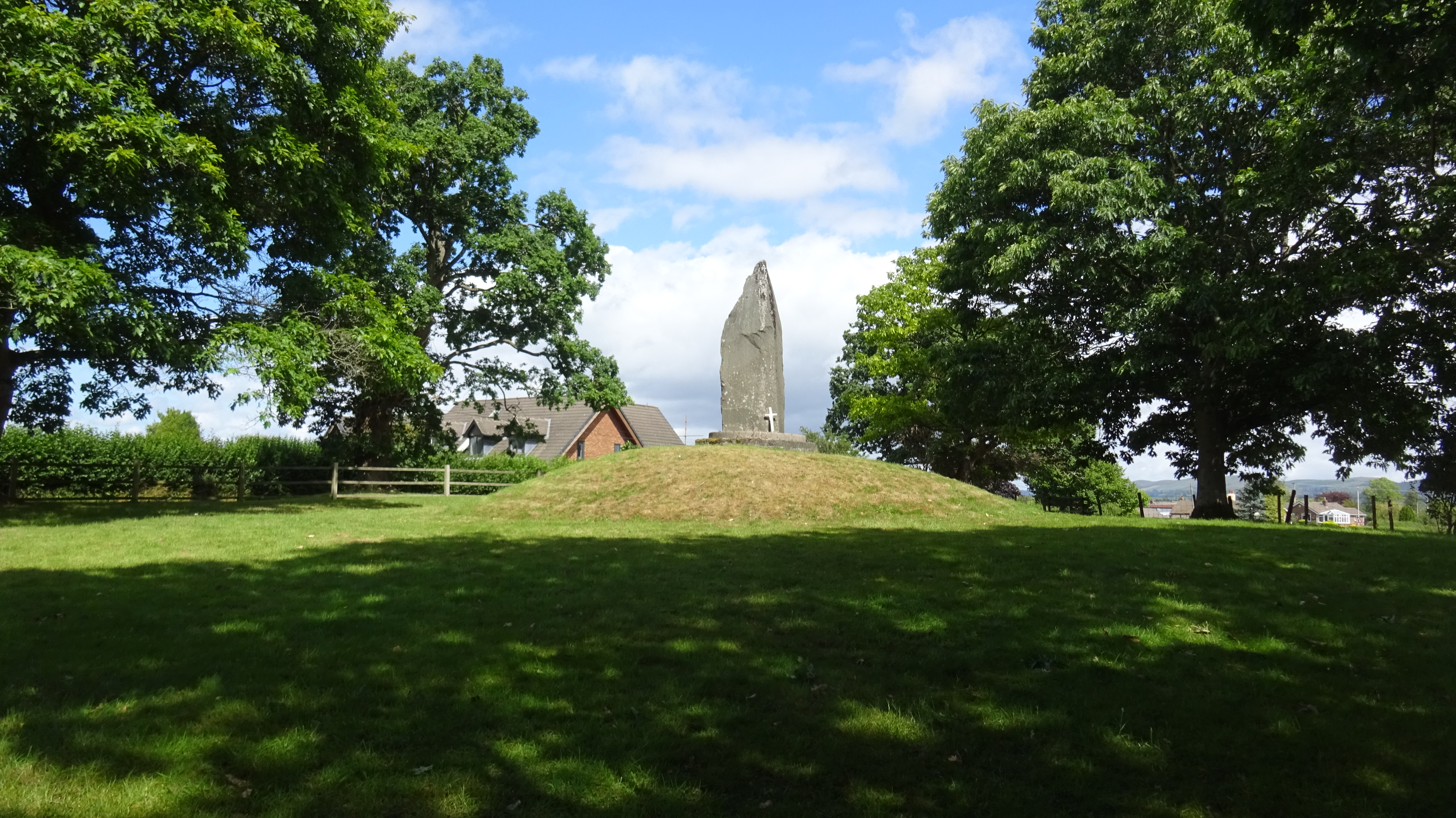
Memmorial to Prince Llywelyn ap Gruffydd on the site of the Battle of Orewin Bridge (1282) at Cilmeri in Wales

The legislation to protect historic battlefields is relatively recent, and arose following several key incidents involving important sites e.g. the discovery in 1997 of an unprotected mass grave of soldiers who fought at the 1461 Battle of Towton and a large metal detector rally held on the battlefield of Marston Moor in 2003.

Battlefield sites in England are material considerations in the planning process and are designated by Historic England and put onto the Register of Historic Battlefields under powers conferred under the Historic Buildings and Ancient Monuments Act, 1983 (as amended). This legislation did not confer a specific responsibility to create a register of battlefields, (only a register for historic parks and gardens), but a joint project between English Heritage, the National Army Museum and the Battlefields Trust in 1995 created a register. In 2011 this registered was incorporated into the National Heritage List for England, administered by Historic England.

In Scotland, the Inventory of historic battlefields was introduced in 2009 and is compiled by Historic Environment Scotland on behalf of the Scottish Ministers. This is done under the Historic Environment (Amendment) (Scotland) Act 2011, following on from the Scottish Historic Environment Policy (July 2009) with further guidance issued in March 2011.

In England, submissions are considered by English Heritage’s Battlefields Panel which is a non-executive specialist panel that advises the organisation on policy and practice. Members include archaeologist Dr Glenn Foard and Major General Julian Thompson CB OBE. Even though there is no legal requirement for English Heritage to be consulted over planning applications which affect registered battlefields although they must be considered by the local planning authority. Registration of battlefields means that any proposed development on the sites and their settings a material consideration under planning legislation.

Planning Policy Statement 5 Planning for the Historic Environment states that there should be a presumption in favour of the conservation of designated historic assets, and that local authorities should assess whether an application for development outweighs the "disbenefits". It also recognises that there are many historic assets that are not currently designated, and that despite that, they should still be a presumption in favour of conservation such that substantial harm to, or loss of, the battlefield should be "wholly exceptional".

Some sites also receive protection under separate legislation, for example, the parts of the Battle of Maldon is part of the Coastal Protection Belt, a Special Landscape Area and a Site of Special Scientific Interest. The Battle of Evesham site is subject to local plan policies which constrain development beyond its current extent.

Legislation regarding metal detecting and the Portable Antiquities Scheme also applies to historic battlefield sites across the UK.

However, because there is often little to see above ground, sites are regularly threatened by new road and residential development. The 2010 Heritage at Risk survey identifies several sites that are "at risk" including the site of the Battle of Newburn Ford which has been subject to piecemeal, peripheral development and much of the site of the Battle of Stamford Bridge lies under modern development

War cemeteries are designated separately.

== Criteria for designation ==
Although there are many historic battlefields in England only a few are considered to be important enough to be included in the register. The current criteria for designation are:

- Historic significance – the battle must have had a significant impact on English history.
- It must have involved recognised military units and the area on which the forces formed up and fought must be capable of definition on the ground.
- Surviving topographical and built features which played a part in the battle are important as is the potential for battlefield archaeology, i.e. the survival of features and items from the battle such as graves and weapons.
- Documents and memorials that help with the understanding of the battle through eye-witness accounts or subsequent investigation will also raise the site’s significance.

In Scotland, the criteria are similar but with the additional requirement that it must be possible to define the site on a modern map with a reasonable degree of accuracy. English Heritage is currently (May 2011) reviewing the criteria in the light of recent battlefield studies and developments in battlefield archaeology.

Unlike listed buildings, Registered battlefields in England are not graded according to their relative significance. This is also something that is under consideration.

== Identification of battlefields ==
Crossed swords symbol

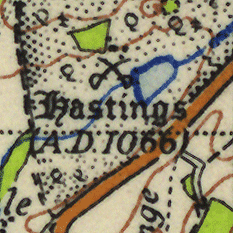
OS map showing the location of the Battle of Hastings (1066)

Registered battlefields are represented on Ordnance Survey maps by a crossed swords symbol alongside the year of conflict
- Application online using a form on the Historic England web site or by contacting Historic Scotland
- An initial assessment is carried out by English Heritage/ or Historic Scotland to find out if meets the designation criteria.
- If it does, the owner and local planning authority is told about the application.
- Further research is carried out on the history and description of the site and put into an initial report using in consultation with the owner, local planning authority, the Battlefields Trust and applicant.
- All the information and representations are considered, and English Heritage or Historic Scotland makes a decision.

Registered battlefields are represented on Ordnance Survey maps by a crossed swords symbol alongside the year of conflict.

== List of historic battlefields ==
The UK Battlefields Trust claims that there are more than 500 historic battlefields and other fields of conflict in England up to the Jacobite risings of the 18th century. It is gradually compiling a UK "Fields of Conflict" database in collaboration with Historic Scotland, Leeds University and English Heritage. An independent Scottish Battlefields Trust was established in 2015 to protect, promote and interpret the battlefield heritage of Scotland.

The English Heritage Register of Historic Battlefields identifies 43 English battlefields, whilst Historic Scotland has 17 sites on its Inventory. The purpose of both the register and inventory is to offer them protection and to promote a better understanding of their significance. The location, brief historic details and designation for each registered battlefield in England can be searched using The National Heritage List for England. There are also details of sources, history and archaeological excavations for each site where available on the English Heritage website. Scottish historic battlefields can be searched online using PASTMAP .

=== English historic battlefields ===
- Battle of Adwalton Moor (1643)
- Battle of Barnet (1471)
- Battle of Blore Heath (1459)
- Battle of Boroughbridge (1322)
- Battle of Bosworth Field (1485)
- Battle of Braddock Down (1643)
- Battle of Chalgrove (1643)
- Battle of Cheriton (1644)
- Battle of Cropredy Bridge (1644)
- Battle of Edgehill (1642)
- Battle of Evesham (1265)
- Battle of Flodden (1513)
- Battle of Halidon Hill (1333)
- Battle of Hastings (1066)
- Battle of Homildon Hill (1402)
- Battle of Hopton Heath (1643)
- Battle of Langport (1645)
- Battle of Lansdowne (1643)
- Battle of Lewes (1264)
- Battle of Maldon (991)
- Battle of Marston Moor (1644)
- Battle of Myton (1319)
- Battle of Nantwich (1644)
- Battle of Naseby (1645)
- Battle of Neville's Cross (1346)
- Battle of Newburn Ford (1640)
- Battle of Newbury (1643)
- Battle of Northallerton (1138)
- Battle of Northampton (1460)
- Battle of Otterburn (1388)
- Battle of Roundway Down (1643)
- Battle of Rowton Heath (1645)
- Battle of Sedgemoor (1685)
- Battle of Shrewsbury (1403)
- Battle of Solway Moss (1542)
- Battle of Stamford Bridge (1066)
- Battle of Stoke Field (1487)
- Battle of Stow-on-the-Wold (1646)
- Battle of Stratton (1643)
- Battle of Tewkesbury (1471)
- Battle of Towton (1461)
- Battle of Winceby (1643)
- Battle of Winwick (also known as Battle of Red Bank) (1648)
- Battle of Worcester (1651) with Powick Old Bridge (1642)

=== Scottish historic battlefields ===
- Battle of Alford (1645)
- Battle of Harlaw (1411)
- Battle of Dunbar II (1650)
- Battle of Pinkie (1547)
- Battle of Prestonpans (1745)
- Battle of Falkirk II (1746)
- Battle of Auldearn (1645)
- Battle of Culloden (1746)
- Battle of Glenshiel (1719)
- Battle of Kilsyth (1645)
- Battle of Dupplin Moor (1332)
- Battle of Killiecrankie (1689)
- Battle of Ancrum Moor (1545)
- Battle of Philiphaugh (1645)
- Battle of Bothwell Bridge (1679)
- Battle of Bannockburn (1314)
- Battle of Sheriffmuir (1715)

== See also ==
- Inventory of Historic Battlefields in Scotland
- National Heritage List for England
- Register of Historic Parks and Gardens of Special Historic Interest in England
- Listed building
- Scheduled monument
