= S-word =

S-word may refer to:

- Shit, a vulgarism for feces, and a general swear word
- Suicide, the act of intentionally causing one's own death
- S-Word, a Japanese rapper and playable character exclusively in the Japanese version of Def Jam Vendetta
- The "S" Word: a Short History of An American Tradition ... Socialism, a book by John Nichols
- "The S-Word", an episode of the second season of The Boondocks

== See also ==
- Sword (disambiguation)
