= Aïnhoa Risacher =

French basketball player (born 2007)

- Risacher in 2025

No. 10 – ASVEL Féminin
- Position: Shooting guard
- League: LBWL

Personal information
- Born: 13 July 2007 (age 19) Neuilly-sur-Seine, France
- Listed height: 6 ft 2 in (1.88 m)

Career information
- Playing career: 2023–present

Career history
- 2023–present: ASVEL Féminin

Aïnhoa Risacher (born 13 July 2007) is a French professional basketball player for ASVEL Féminin of the La Boulangère Wonderligue (LBWL) and member of the France women's national basketball team.

== Playing career ==
Risacher began her career with the Tony Parker Academy in 2021. She then joined ASVEL Féminin and made her debut in the Ligue Féminine de Basketball on 23 September 2023, at the age of sixteen, in a game against Roche Vendée. During her first season, she appeared in six regular-season games, and by the following season, she became a full-time member of the team.

She represented team World at the 2025 Nike Hoop Summit where she recorded six points, three rebounds, and one assist. On 25 July 2025, she signed a two-year contract with ASVEL Féminin.

== National team career ==
Risacher represented France at the 2022 FIBA U16 Women's European Championship where she averaged 6.3 points and 5.0 rebounds per game and won a gold medal. She again competed at the 2023 FIBA U16 Women's European Championship where she averaged 11.7 points, 4.7 rebounds, and 3.9 assists per game and won a gold medal. Following the tournament she was named MVP.

She represented France at the 2024 FIBA Under-17 Women's Basketball World Cup where she averaged 9.6 points, 5.6 rebounds, and 2.3 assists per game. Following the tournament she was named to the FIBA U17 World Cup All-First Team.

She represented France at the 2025 FIBA Under-19 Women's Basketball World Cup where she averaged 8.0 points and 5.0 rebounds per game. In July 2026, she represented France at the 2026 FIBA U20 Women's EuroBasket where she averaged 9.9 points and 4.0 rebounds per game and won a gold medal.

== Personal life ==
Risacher is the daughter of former professional basketball player Stéphane Risacher. Her older brother, Zaccharie, was drafted first overall by the Atlanta Hawks in the 2024 NBA draft.
