= FIBA Under-17 Women's Basketball World Cup Most Valuable Player =

Youth basketball award

The FIBA Under-17 Women's Basketball World Cup Most Valuable Player is a bi-annual award, that is given by FIBA, to the Most Valuable Player of the FIBA Under-17 Women’s Basketball World Cup.

== Winners ==
	Denotes player whose team won that years tournament
	Denotes player inducted into the FIBA Hall of Fame
	Denotes player who is still active
Player (X)	Denotes the number of times the player had been named MVP at that time
Team (X)	Denotes the number of times a player from this team had won at that time

Year	Player	Position	Team	Ref.
2010	Li Meng	Guard	China	
2012	Diamond DeShields	Guard	United States	
2014	Ángela Salvadores	Guard	Spain	
2016	Ezi Magbegor	Forward	Australia	
2018	Jordan Horston	Guard	United States (2)	
2022	JuJu Watkins	Guard	United States (3)	
2024	Jerzy Robinson	Guard	United States (4)	
2026	Ivanna Wilson Manyacka	Forward	United States (5)	
