= McKenna Woliczko =

American basketball player (born 2008)

No. 20 – Iowa Hawkeyes
- Position: Power forward
- Conference: Big Ten Conference

Personal information
- Born: May 12, 2008 (age 18)
- Listed height: 6 ft 2 in (1.88 m)

Career information
- High school: Archbishop Mitty (San Jose, California)
- College: Iowa (2026–present)

Career highlights
- McDonald's All-American (2026); Nike Hoop Summit (2026)
Medals
Women's basketball
Representing the United States
FIBA Under-17 World Cup
Gold medal – first place	2024 Mexico	Team
FIBA Under-16 Americas Championship
Gold medal – first place	2023 Mexico	Team

McKenna Woliczko (born May 12, 2008) is an American college basketball player for the Iowa Hawkeyes of the Big Ten Conference. She attended Archbishop Mitty High School and was a five-star recruit and one of the top players in the 2026 class.

== Early life ==
Woliczko is the daughter of Aaron and Erica Woliczko. She began playing softball at seven years old. She also played soccer, volleyball and basketball growing up. Her mother was a three-sport athlete at Capuchino High School, playing volleyball, soccer and softball. Erica played college softball at University of the Pacific (UOP). Her father played college basketball at UOP, where he met his future wife. Aaron then served as head coach of the men's basketball team at Montana Tech, after serving as an assistant coach at his alma-mater. Aaron is the West Coast Conference's Senior Associate Commissioner for men's basketball and sports administration.

== High school career ==
Woliczko attends Archbishop Mitty High School in San Jose, California where she was a two-sport athlete playing both softball and basketball. During her freshman year she was named a MaxPreps Freshman All-American selection, and named the MaxPreps Co-National Freshmen of the Year, along with Jerzy Robinson. During her sophomore year, she averaged 22.1 points and 7.3 rebounds per game and named the MaxPreps National Sophomore of the Year 2023-24 MaxPreps Sophomore All-America Team also being a 1st Team All- America selection.

During her junior year she averaged 22.2 points and 8.6 rebounds per game in ten games, before suffering a season-ending torn ACL in her right knee on January 4, 2025. She made her return a year later on January 2, 2026, and scored 19 points and 13 rebounds. On February 2, 2026, she was selected to play in the 2026 McDonald's All-American Girls Game. She then competed at the 2026 Nike Hoop Summit where she recorded 10 points and 13 rebounds, for the first double-double in Nike Hoop Summit history. Her 13 rebounds set a new Nike Hoop Summit single-game record.

=== Recruiting ===
Woliczko is considered a five-star recruit. Her final four schools included Iowa, South Carolina, Ohio State. and USC. On October 1, 2025, she committed to play college basketball at Iowa. As the No. 6 overall player in the class of 2026, she became Iowa's highest-ranked recruit since Caitlin Clark. On November 12, 2025, she signed her National Letter of Intent to play at Iowa.

== National team career ==
Woliczko represented the United States at the 2023 FIBA Under-16 Women's Americas Championship where she averaged 11.8 points and 9.7 rebounds per game and won a gold medal. Following the tournament she was named to the All-Star Five.

She represented the United States at the 2024 FIBA Under-17 Women's Basketball World Cup and won a gold medal. She averaged 12.4 points and 9.6 rebounds per games, and was named to the FIBA U17 World Cup All-First Team. On July 19, 2024, during the quarterfinals against Japan she recorded 17 rebounds, tying Aquira DeCosta's single-game rebound record for the United States.
