= Inforum (Irapuato) =

Convention center in Irapuato, Guanajuato, Mexico

Coordinates: 20.7177°N 101.3366°W

The Inforum is a convention center located in Irapuato, Guanajuato, Mexico. It is the site of the annual ExpoFresas, which is held every December.

== History ==
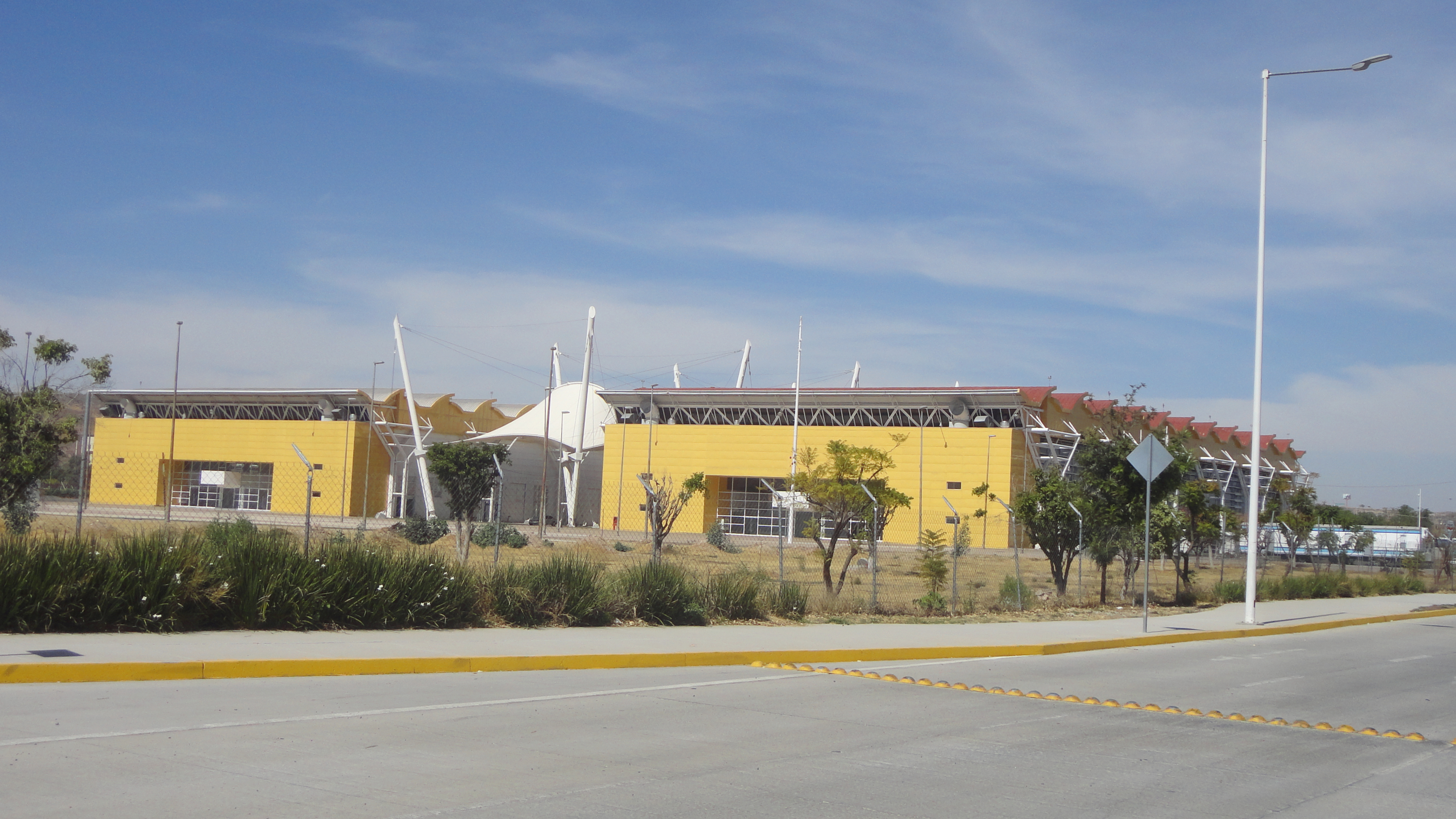
Inforum in February 2021

The Inforum was refurbished with works completed in January 2023. With an investment of 150 million pesos, the venue was prepared to be part of the wider tourism and industrial development initiative, promoted by Guanajuato Governor Diego Sinhue, who attended the re-opening ceremony.

== The Pavilions ==
The twin pavilions of the Inforum each have 45,565 square feet (4,233.1 m^{2}) of exhibit space and have a height of 39.37 feet (12.00 m) of space. Each has a 3,122.6-square-foot (290.10 m^{2}) lobby. Each can accommodate up to 6,000 people for concerts, sporting events, conventions and trade shows. Both pavilions are connected by an outdoor multifunctional plaza with 645,835 square feet (60,000 square meters) of space. Pavilion 1 contains a mezzanine level and is the pavilion most often used for major events such as the aforementioned.

== Concerts and Events ==
Several artists and bands from different genres have performed in the Inforum. The Inforum is the venue for the annual Irapuato Jazz Festival, which includes music and talks. In April 2023 the Brazilian heavy metal band Sepultura announced a show. Concerts and events take place in two facilities within the Inforum:

=== Centro de Espectaculos ===
The Centro de Espectaculos is an indoor arena used for concerts, sporting events, and other special events. It was built as a Palenque with its center-stage measuring 71.78 square meters (772.5 square feet) Its concert capacity is up to 6,000 with 1,953 in chairback seats, five in handicapped seating, and the rest in benches. A design for the Centro de Espectaculos was done by Mexican Architect Tatiana Bilbao in 2009, but not built.

=== Foro Abierto ===
The Foro Abierto is a 3,000-seat amphitheater which opened in 2013 and is used primarily for concerts and stage shows.

== Sports ==
The Inforum is the home of the basketball team Freseros de Irapuato, who participate in Mexico's National Basketball League. It has also been the venue of box fights such as the TKO victory of Isaac Cruz over Ricardo Juan Saenz in 2017.

It hosted matches for the 2024 FIBA Under-17 Women's Basketball World Cup.
