= FIBA Under-17 Women's Basketball World Cup All-Tournament Team =

Youth basketball award

The FIBA Under-17 Women's Basketball World Cup All-Tournament Team is a bi-annual award, that is given by FIBA, to the five best players of the FIBA Under-17 Women’s Basketball World Cup.

== Honourees ==
Year	First Team			Second Team			Ref.
Year	Player	Position	Team	Player	Position	Team	Ref.
2012	Diamond DeShields	Guard	United States	not awarded			
2012	Linnae Harper	Guard	United States	not awarded			
2012	Leticia Romero	Guard	Spain	not awarded			
2012	Yunika Nakamura	Forward	Japan	not awarded			
2012	Evelyn Mawuli	Center	Japan	not awarded			
2014	Ángela Salvadores	Guard	Spain	not awarded			
2014	Debora Dubei	Guard	Hungary	not awarded			
2014	Katie Lou Samuelson	Forward	United States	not awarded			
2014	Joyner Holmes	Forward	United States	not awarded			
2014	Virág Kiss	Center	Hungary	not awarded			
2016	Monique Conti	Guard	Australia	not awarded			
2016	Jasmine Simmons	Forward	Australia	not awarded			
2016	Ezi Magbegor	Forward	Australia	not awarded			
2016	Sara Madera	Forward	Italy	not awarded			
2016	Han Xu	Center	China	not awarded			
2018	Jordan Horston	Guard	United States	not awarded			
2018	Shyla Heal	Guard	Australia	not awarded			
2018	Haley Jones	Guard	United States	not awarded			
2018	Aliyah Boston	Forward	United States	not awarded			
2018	Iliana Rupert	Center	France	not awarded			
2022	Iyana Martín	Point guard	Spain	not awarded			
2022	JuJu Watkins	Guard	United States	not awarded			
2022	Jaloni Cambridge	Guard	United States	not awarded			
2022	Cassandre Prosper	Small forward	Canada	not awarded			
2022	Dominique Malonga	Center	France	not awarded			
2024	Jerzy Robinson	Guard	United States	Savannah Swords	Forward	Canada	
2024	Agot Makeer	Guard	Canada	Sara Yamada	Guard	Japan	
2024	Ainhoa Risacher	Guard	France	Olivia Vukosa	Forward	Croatia	
2024	McKenna Woliczko	Forward	United States	Jordyn Palmer	Small forward	United States	
2024	Sara Okeke	Center	Spain	Ines Garcia Monje	Forward	Spain	
2026	Isabel Hernández	Guard	Spain	Olivia Olechnowicz	Forward	Australia	
2026	Miya Takeuchi	Guard	Japan	Anais Gobec	Guard	Slovenia	
2026	Ivanna Wilson Manyacka	Forward	United States	Micah Ojo	Forward	United States	
2026	Madison Ryan	Forward	Australia	Li Yuanshan	Forward	China	
2026	Frances Vollett	Forward	Canada	Amelia Alonso	Forward	Spain	
