= 2026 McDonald's All-American Girls Game =

Basketball game

West	East
71	91
- Date: March 31, 2026
- Venue: Desert Diamond Arena, Glendale, Arizona
- MVP: Saniyah Hall
- Network: ESPN2

McDonald's All-American

The 2026 McDonald's All-American Girls Game was an all-star basketball game that was played on March 31, 2026, at the Desert Diamond Arena in Glendale, Arizona. The game's rosters featured the best and most highly recruited high school girls graduating in the class of 2026. The game was the 24th annual version of the McDonald's All-American Game first played in 2002. The 24 players were selected from over 700 nominees by a committee of basketball experts. They were chosen not only for their on-court skills, but for their performances off the court as well.

== Rosters ==
The roster was announced on February 2, 2026. Kentucky and Texas had the most selections with three each, while Duke and Notre Dame had two each.

=== Team East ===
ESPNW 100 Rank	Name	Height	Position	Hometown	High school	College choice
12	Autumn Fleary	5–7	PG	Washington, D.C.	Sidwell Friends School	Duke
1	Saniyah Hall	6–0	G	Lorain, Ohio	SPIRE Institute	USC
4	Kate Harpring	5–10	PG	Atlanta, Georgia	Marist School	North Carolina
7	Jordyn Jackson	6–1	G	Washington, D.C.	St. James Performance Academy	Maryland
14	Olivia Jones	5–11	G	Brookville, New York	Long Island Lutheran	Vanderbilt
29	Lola Lampley	6–2	W	Indianapolis, Indiana	Lawrence Central High School	LSU
24	Jenica Lewis	5-10	G	Johnston, Iowa	Johnston High School	Notre Dame
23	Emily McDonald	6–0	G	Brookville, New York	Long Island Lutheran	Kentucky
28	Addy Nyemchek	6–1	W	Oceanport, New Jersey	Red Bank Catholic High School	Indiana
19	Savvy Swords	6–1	W	Brookville, New York	Long Island Lutheran	Kentucky
3	Olivia Vukoša	6-4	P	Whitestone, New York	Christ the King Regional High School	UConn
15	Lilly Williams	6-5	P	Howell, Michigan	Howell High School	Michigan State

=== Team West ===
ESPNW 100 Rank	Name	Height	Position	Hometown	High school	College choice
9	Jacy Abii	6–2	W	Frisco, Texas	Legion Prep Academy	Notre Dame
10	Addison Bjorn	6–1	W	Riverside, Missouri	Park Hill South High School	Texas
33	Cydnee Bryant	6–3	P	Corona, California	Centennial High School	Kansas
8	Brihanna Crittendon	6–3	W	Thornton, Colorado	Riverdale Ridge	Texas
2	Oliviyah Edwards	6–3	F	Tacoma, Washington	Lincoln High School	Tennessee
16	Bella Flemings	6–0	G	San Antonio, Texas	William J. Brennan High School	Duke
13	Maddyn Greenway	5–8	PG	Plymouth, Minnesota	Providence Academy	Kentucky
11	Trinity Jones	6–1	G	Bolingbrook, Illinois	Naperville Central High School	Clemson
22	Ashlyn Koupal	6–2	G	Wagner, South Dakota	Wagner Community School	Nebraska
5	Jerzy Robinson	6–0	G	Chatsworth, California	Sierra Canyon School	South Carolina
20	Aaliah Spaight	5–7	PG	Las Vegas, Nevada	Bishop Gorman High School	Texas
6	McKenna Woliczko	6-2	W	San Jose, California	Archbishop Mitty High School	Iowa
