= Kate Harpring =

American basketball player (born 2008)

No. 11 – North Carolina Tar Heels
- Position: Guard
- Conference: Atlantic Coast Conference

Personal information
- Born: January 10, 2008 (age 18) Utah, U.S.
- Listed height: 5 ft 11 in (1.80 m)

Career information
- High school: Marist School (Atlanta, Georgia)
- College: North Carolina (2026–present)

Career highlights
- Naismith Prep Player of the Year Award (2026); Morgan Wootten National Player of the Year (2026); McDonald's All-American (2026); Miss Georgia Basketball (2026)
Medals
Women's basketball
Representing the United States
FIBA Under-19 World Cup
Gold medal – first place	2025 Czech Republic	Team

Kate Harpring (born January 10, 2008) is an American college basketball player for the North Carolina Tar Heels of the Atlantic Coast Conference (ACC). She attended Marist School and was a five-star recruit and one of the top players in the 2026 class.

== Early life ==
Harpring is the daughter of former professional basketball player Matt Harpring. She was born in Utah while her father was playing for the Utah Jazz.

== High school career ==
Harpring attended Marist School in Atlanta, Georgia. During her junior year she averaged 32.2 points, 10.6 rebounds, 5.1 steals, 3.7 assists and 1.2 blocks per game, and led Marist to the Class AAAA state championship. Following the season she was named the Georgia Gatorade Player of the Year.

During her senior year she averaged 29.5 points, 11.2 rebounds, 4.2 steals and 4.1 assists per game and was named the Georgia Gatorade Player of the Year for the second consecutive year. She led Marist to their second consecutive Class AAAA state championship, and became the Georgia High School Association's all-time leading scorer with 3,435 points. Following the season was named Miss Georgia Basketball, Naismith Prep Player of the Year, and Morgan Wootten National Player of the Year.

On February 2, 2026, she was selected to play in the 2026 McDonald's All-American Girls Game.

=== Recruiting ===
Harpring is considered a five-star recruit and the number one player in the 2026 class, according to 247Sports, and the number four player according to ESPN. On August 9, 2025, she committed to play college basketball at North Carolina.

== National team career ==
On June 20, 2025, Harpring was named to the United States under-19 national team for the 2025 FIBA Under-19 Women's Basketball World Cup. During the tournament she averaged 8.3 points, 3.7 rebounds and 2.4 assists per game and won a gold medal.
