= 2024 FIBA Under-17 Women's Basketball World Cup =

2024 edition of the FIBA Under-17 Women's Basketball World Cup

Campeonato Mundial de Baloncesto Femenino Sub-17 de 2024

Tournament details
- Host country: Mexico
- Dates: 13–21 July
- Teams: 16 (from 5 confederations)
- Venues: 2 (in 2 host cities)

Final positions
- Champions: United States (6th title)
- Runners-up: Canada
- Third place: Spain
- Fourth place: France

Tournament statistics
- Games played: 56
- MVP: (United States) Jerzy Robinson
- Top scorer: (United States) Jerzy Robinson (20.9 ppg)

Official website
- Website

The 2024 FIBA Under-17 Women's Basketball World Cup was the eighth edition of the FIBA Under-17 Women's Basketball World Cup, the biennial international women's youth basketball championship. The tournament was hosted in Mexico from 13 to 21 July 2024. This marked the first time that Mexico had host a FIBA global tournament. It was also the first time the tournament was held outside of Europe.

To be eligible for this competition, players must be born on or after 1 January 2007.

The United States won their sixth world cup title, after defeated Canada 84–64 in final.

== Qualified teams ==
Means of qualification	Date(s)	Venue(s)	Berth(s)	Qualifiers
Host nation	—N/a	—N/a	1	Mexico
2023 FIBA Under-16 Women's Americas Championship	11–19 June 2023	(Mexico) Mérida	4	United States; Canada; Argentina; Puerto Rico
2023 FIBA Under-16 Women's Asian Championship	10–16 July 2023	(Jordan) Amman	4	Australia; Japan; New Zealand; Chinese Taipei
2023 FIBA U16 Women's African Championship	11–20 July 2023	(Tunisia) Monastir	2	Mali; Egypt
2023 FIBA U16 Women's European Championship	11–19 August 2023	(Turkey) İzmir	5	France; Spain; Italy; Finland; Croatia
Total			16	

== Venues ==
León	Irapuato	2024 FIBA Under-17 Women's Basketball World Cup (Mexico)
Domo de la Feria	Inforum	
Capacity: 7,000	Capacity: 6,000	

== Draw ==
The draw took place on 11 April 2024 in León.

=== Seeding ===
The seeding was announced on 10 April 2024.

Pot 1 Team Mexico United States France Spain	Pot 2 Team Canada Australia Japan Italy	Pot 3 Team Finland Mali Croatia Egypt	Pot 4 Team Argentina New Zealand Puerto Rico Chinese Taipei

== Preliminary round ==
All times are local (UTC−5).

=== Group A ===
Pos	Team	Pld	W	L	PF	PA	PD	Pts
1	Spain	3	3	0	237	124	+113	6
2	Japan	3	2	1	203	171	+32	5
3	Finland	3	1	2	159	191	−32	4
4	Argentina	3	0	3	131	244	−113	3

Source: FIBA
Rules for classification: 1) Points; 2) Head-to-head results; 3) Points difference; 4) Points scored.

13 July 2024
13:00

Boxscore

Spain	99–29	Argentina
Scoring by quarter: 24–11, 22–4, 26–5, 27–9
Pts: Cargol 22; Rebs: Sanz 8 Asts: Cargol 9		Pts: Barrionuevo, Roldán 6 Rebs: Morell 7 Asts: three players 2

Domo de la Feria, León
Attendance: 346
Referees: Edwin Quiles (PUR), Lee Ji-youn (KOR), Franko Gracin (CRO)

13 July 2024
15:30

Boxscore

Japan	62–60	Finland
Scoring by quarter: 12–16, 12–9, 18–13, 20–22
Pts: Suzuki 14; Rebs: Abe 13; Asts: Yamada 6		Pts: Talonen 15; Rebs: Ogun 11; Asts: Mace 3

Domo de la Feria, León
Attendance: 284
Referees: Mihkel Männiste (EST), Alexandra-Ioana Stan (ROU), Issam Al-Siyabi (OMA)

14 July 2024
13:00

Boxscore

Finland	35–71	Spain
Scoring by quarter: 12–12, 6–15, 11–21, 6–23
Pts: Talonen 16; Rebs: Ogun 12; Asts: three players 2		Pts: Okeke 19; Rebs: Mouriño 11; Asts: G. García 7

Domo de la Feria, León
Attendance: 300
Referees: Lee Ji-youn (KOR), Kevin Lei (CAN), Ruben Woolcock (AUS)

14 July 2024
15:30

Boxscore

Argentina	44–81	Japan
Scoring by quarter: 14–20, 10–20, 6–22, 14–19
Pts: Boullon 12; Rebs: Barrionuevo 8 Asts: Depetris 3		Pts: Hamada, Seito 14; Rebs: Suzuki 12; Asts: Yamada 10

Domo de la Feria, León
Attendance: 180
Referees: Ventsislav Velikov (BUL), Paulina Gajdosz (POL), Natascha Onono (RSA)

16 July 2024
13:00

Boxscore

Argentina	58–64	Finland
Scoring by quarter: 12–13, 23–15, 2–26, 21–10
Pts: Depretis 17; Rebs: Morell 8 Asts: Depretis 6		Pts: Seppa 17; Rebs: Seppa 13; Asts: five players 2

Domo de la Feria, León
Attendance: 92
Referees: Franko Gracin (CRO), Kevin Lei (CAN), Alexandra-Ioana Stan (ROU)

16 July 2024
18:00

Boxscore

Japan	60–67	Spain
Scoring by quarter: 10–20, 15–14, 10–14, 25–19
Pts: Hamada 16; Rebs: Abe 6 Asts: Hamada 4		Pts: Sanz 18; Rebs: I. García 11; Asts: G. García 5

Domo de la Feria, León
Attendance: 300
Referees: James Griguol (AUS), Paulina Gajdosz (POL), Ruben Woolcock (AUS)

=== Group B ===
Pos	Team	Pld	W	L	PF	PA	PD	Pts
1	Italy	3	3	0	226	155	+71	6
2	New Zealand	3	2	1	245	199	+46	5
3	Mali	3	1	2	160	230	−70	4
4	Mexico (H)	3	0	3	183	230	−47	3

Source: FIBA
Rules for classification: 1) Points; 2) Head-to-head results; 3) Points difference; 4) Points scored.
(H) Hosts

13 July 2024
18:00

Boxscore

Italy	71–63	New Zealand
Scoring by quarter: 19–21, 22–11, 14–12, 16–19
Pts: Mohamud 27; Rebs: Mohamud 15; Asts: Giacchetti 4		Pts: Flavell 24; Rebs: Sefo 7 Asts: McMechan 3

Domo de la Feria, León
Attendance: 120
Referees: Ventsislav Velikov (BUL), Paulina Gajdosz (POL), James Griguol (AUS)

13 July 2024
20:30

Boxscore

Mexico	61–62	Mali
Scoring by quarter: 7–18, 21–23, 17–15, 16–6
Pts: Romero 16; Rebs: LeBarón 8 Asts: Acuña 5		Pts: Keita 14; Rebs: Mariko 11; Asts: Traoré 6

Domo de la Feria, León
Attendance: 500
Referees: Kevin Lei (CAN), Natascha Onono (RSA), Petar Pešić (SRB)

14 July 2024
18:00

Boxscore

Mali	51–85	Italy
Scoring by quarter: 16–14, 2–22, 22–36, 11–13
Pts: Keita 13; Rebs: Mariko, Singaré 6 Asts: Ouattara 5		Pts: Baldassarre 19; Rebs: Giacchetti 8 Asts: Giacchetti 8

Domo de la Feria, León
Attendance: 483
Referees: Mihkel Männiste (EST), Edwin Quiles (PUR), James Griguol (AUS)

14 July 2024
20:30

Boxscore

New Zealand	98–81	Mexico
Scoring by quarter: 19–22, 20–15, 33–18, 26–26
Pts: Flavell 25; Rebs: Hastings 9 Asts: Hippolite 6		Pts: Romero 23; Rebs: LeBarón 9 Asts: Romero 6

Domo de la Feria, León
Attendance: 638
Referees: Franko Gracin (CRO), Alexandra-Ioana Stan (ROU), Hu Jing (CHN)

16 July 2024
15:30

Boxscore

Mali	47–84	New Zealand
Scoring by quarter: 9–13, 10–23, 14–24, 14–24
Pts: Diarra 13; Rebs: Mariko 10; Asts: Diarra 4		Pts: Flavell 19; Rebs: Hippolite, Sefo 10; Asts: Hippolite 5

Domo de la Feria, León
Attendance: 75
Referees: Ventsislav Velikov (BUL), Petar Pešić (SRB), Edwin Quiles (PUR)

16 July 2024
20:30

Boxscore

Italy	70–41	Mexico
Scoring by quarter: 15–8, 10–9, 21–11, 24–13
Pts: Ostoni 21; Rebs: D'Este 20; Asts: Giacchetti, Gorini 6		Pts: Romero 10; Rebs: LeBarón 7 Asts: Acuña 7

Domo de la Feria, León
Attendance: 954
Referees: Mihkel Männiste (EST), Lee Ji-youn (KOR), Issam Al-Siyabi (OMA)

=== Group C ===
Pos	Team	Pld	W	L	PF	PA	PD	Pts
1	United States	3	3	0	326	133	+193	6
2	Australia	3	2	1	218	215	+3	5
3	Croatia	3	1	2	206	284	−78	4
4	Puerto Rico	3	0	3	147	265	−118	3

Source: FIBA
Rules for classification: 1) Points; 2) Head-to-head results; 3) Points difference; 4) Points scored.

13 July 2024
17:30

Boxscore

Puerto Rico	65–77	Croatia
Scoring by quarter: 16–29, 19–11, 14–11, 16–26
Pts: Guerra, Robles 16; Rebs: Jackson, Nieves 8 Asts: Canales, Robles 3		Pts: Vukosa 21; Rebs: Vukosa 23; Asts: Vukosa 4

Inforum, Irapuato
Referees: Aline García (URU), Juozas Barkauskas (LTU), Çisil Güngör (TUR)

13 July 2024
20:00

Boxscore

Australia	55–82	United States
Scoring by quarter: 15–17, 17–25, 10–31, 13–9
Pts: Somfai 15; Rebs: Fagan 9 Asts: Ryan 3		Pts: Robinson 14; Rebs: Woliczko 9 Asts: Lampley, Palmer 2

Inforum, Irapuato
Attendance: 1,800
Referees: Orlando Varela (HON), Franco Ronconi (ARG), Martin Davison (NZL)

14 July 2024
17:30

Boxscore

United States	121–36	Puerto Rico
Scoring by quarter: 39–7, 36–7, 24–7, 22–15
Pts: Palmer 20; Rebs: Bjorn, Wilson Manyacka 9 Asts: three players 4		Pts: Jackson, Robles 8 Rebs: Jackson 8 Asts: Robles 3

Inforum, Irapuato
Attendance: 1,000
Referees: Leong Chuen Wing (SGP), Silvia Marziali (ITA), Claudio Eiuba (ARG)

14 July 2024
20:00

Boxscore

Croatia	87–96	Australia
Scoring by quarter: 26–14, 12–17, 26–41, 23–24
Pts: Bilić 23; Rebs: Vukosa 9 Asts: three players 5		Pts: Perkins 25; Rebs: Fagan, Somfai 7 Asts: Perkins 7

Inforum, Irapuato
Attendance: 1,343
Referees: Fernando Calatrava (ESP), Yezig Carreño (COL), Jesús López (MEX)

16 July 2024
15:00

Boxscore

Puerto Rico	46–67	Australia
Scoring by quarter: 6–18, 7–22, 16–7, 17–20
Pts: Jackson 14; Rebs: Robles 4 Asts: Guerra, Nieves 2		Pts: Finney 12; Rebs: Fagan 12; Asts: Petrie, Russell 4

Inforum, Irapuato
Referees: Leong Chuen Wing (SGP), Franco Ronconi (ARG), Yana Nikogossyan (KAZ)

16 July 2024
20:00

Boxscore

United States	123–42	Croatia
Scoring by quarter: 24–15, 34–15, 30–9, 35–3
Pts: Wilson Manyacka 21; Rebs: Palmer 8 Asts: Bjorn 6		Pts: Vukosa 12; Rebs: Vukosa 11; Asts: Bilić 3

Inforum, Irapuato
Attendance: 1,800
Referees: Orlando Varela (HON), Aline García (URU), Larissa Sales (BRA)

=== Group D ===
Pos	Team	Pld	W	L	PF	PA	PD	Pts
1	Canada	3	3	0	375	255	+120	6
2	France	3	2	1	222	164	+58	5
3	Chinese Taipei	3	1	2	172	229	−57	4
4	Egypt	3	0	3	141	262	−121	3

Source: FIBA
Rules for classification: 1) Points; 2) Head-to-head results; 3) Points difference; 4) Points scored.

13 July 2024
12:30

Boxscore

Chinese Taipei	44–72	France
Scoring by quarter: 11–27, 9–11, 10–16, 14–18
Pts: Lin 8 Rebs: Peng 4 Asts: Pan 4		Pts: three players 10; Rebs: Bentoumi 10; Asts: Broliron 5

Inforum, Irapuato
Attendance: 178
Referees: Leong Chuen Wing (SGP), Silvia Marziali (ITA), Yana Nikogossyan (KAZ)

13 July 2024
15:00

Boxscore

Egypt	44–95	Canada
Scoring by quarter: 9–34, 13–27, 12–14, 10–20
Pts: Abouelghait 8 Rebs: El-Hemaly 7 Asts: El-Sayed 3		Pts: Makeer 28; Rebs: Parchment, Swords 10; Asts: Prawl 6

Inforum, Irapuato
Referees: Fernando Calatrava (ESP), Yezig Carreño (COL), Claudio Eiuba (ARG)

14 July 2024
12:30

Boxscore

France	98–52	Egypt
Scoring by quarter: 21–12, 25–17, 30–11, 22–12
Pts: Kavoka 17; Rebs: Cissé 9 Asts: Bentoumi, Broliron 4		Pts: Abouelghait 14; Rebs: El-Gendy, El-Shenawy; Asts: three players 2

Inforum, Irapuato
Attendance: 100
Referees: Orlando Varela (HON), Çisil Güngör (TUR), Larissa Sales (BRA)

14 July 2024
15:00

Boxscore

Canada	112–59	Chinese Taipei
Scoring by quarter: 35–11, 30–11, 20–22, 27–15
Pts: Makeer 22; Rebs: Fami 8 Asts: Parchment 4		Pts: Pan 11; Rebs: Peng 6 Asts: Pan 4

Inforum, Irapuato
Attendance: 253
Referees: Aline García (URU), Juozas Barkauskas (LTU), Franco Ronconi (ARG)

16 July 2024
12:30

Boxscore

Canada	68–52	France
Scoring by quarter: 21–13, 14–17, 23–8, 10–14
Pts: Swords 25; Rebs: three players 8 Asts: Prawl 4		Pts: Loubens 17; Rebs: Otto, Poilve 6 Asts: Simplot 3

Inforum, Irapuato
Attendance: 871
Referees: Fernando Calatrava (ESP), Silvia Marziali (ITA), Jesús López (MEX)

16 July 2024
17:30

Boxscore

Chinese Taipei	69–45	Egypt
Scoring by quarter: 18–15, 17–9, 17–8, 17–13
Pts: Pan 15; Rebs: Peng 11; Asts: Peng 6		Pts: El-Baz 10; Rebs: Abouelghait 10; Asts: El-Goly 3

Inforum, Irapuato
Attendance: 768
Referees: Çisil Güngör (TUR), Juozas Barkauskas (LTU), Martin Davison (NZL)

== Final round ==
=== Bracket ===
Round of 16
17 July
Spain	83
Mexico	32
17 July
Australia	89
Chinese Taipei	45
17 July
Finland	78
New Zealand	55
17 July
Puerto Rico	50
Canada	84
17 July
Japan	100
Mali	60
17 July
United States	114
Egypt	45
17 July
Argentina	49
Italy	67
17 July
Croatia	59
France	63

Quarter-finals
19 July
Spain	71
Australia	58
19 July
Finland	44
Canada	82
19 July
Japan	59
United States	95
19 July
Italy	51
France	83

Semi-finals
20 July
Spain	73
Canada	77
20 July
United States	84
France	66

Final
21 July
Canada	64
United States	84
Third place
21 July
Spain	47
France	39

=== Round of 16 ===
17 July 2024
12:30

Boxscore

Australia	89–45	Chinese Taipei
Scoring by quarter: 22–6, 25–10, 26–17, 16–12
Pts: Somfai 14; Rebs: Dakic, Crook 7 Asts: Petrie, Russell 5		Pts: Wu 11; Rebs: Chang 5 Asts: Peng 3

Inforum, Irapuato
Attendance: 100
Referees: Fernando Calatrava (ESP), Silvia Marziali (ITA), Claudio Eiuba (ARG)

17 July 2024
13:00

Boxscore

Finland	78–55	New Zealand
Scoring by quarter: 26–16, 26–11, 11–15, 15–13
Pts: Ogun 17; Rebs: Ogun 15; Asts: Talonen 5		Pts: Flavell 9 Rebs: Sefo 8 Asts: Flavell 3

Domo de la Feria, León
Attendance: 134
Referees: Lee Ji-youn (KOR), Ruben Woolcock (AUS), Paulina Gajdosz (POL)

17 July 2024
15:00

Boxscore

Puerto Rico	50–84	Canada
Scoring by quarter: 14–20, 18–23, 16–17, 2–24
Pts: Robles 18; Rebs: Jackson 8 Asts: Robles 4		Pts: Makeer 21; Rebs: Prawl 9 Asts: Swords 6

Inforum, Irapuato
Attendance: 386
Referees: Aline García (URU), Çisil Güngör (TUR), Martin Davison (NZL)

17 July 2024
15:30

Boxscore

Japan	100–60	Mali
Scoring by quarter: 29–15, 15–18, 22–14, 34–13
Pts: Goto 20; Rebs: Abe 7 Asts: Yamada 10		Pts: Mariko 14; Rebs: Diarisso 8 Asts: Diarra 4

Domo de la Feria, León
Attendance: 50
Referees: Mihkel Männiste (EST), Kevin Lei (CAN), Natascha Onono (RSA)

17 July 2024
17:30

Boxscore

United States	114–45	Egypt
Scoring by quarter: 27–7, 28–10, 35–13, 24–15
Pts: Swain 20; Rebs: Woliczko 9 Asts: Lampley 7		Pts: Abouelghait 13; Rebs: El-Goly 5 Asts: Abouelghait 3

Inforum, Irapuato
Attendance: 400
Referees: Juozas Barkauskas (LTU), Yezig Carreño (COL), Jesús López (MEX)

17 July 2024
18:00

Boxscore

Argentina	49–67	Italy
Scoring by quarter: 21–18, 9–18, 10–14, 9–17
Pts: Depetris, Morell 16; Rebs: Barrionuevo 11; Asts: Barrionuevo 5		Pts: D'Este 11; Rebs: Mohamud 12; Asts: Giacchetti, Mohamud 4

Domo de la Feria, León
Attendance: 200
Referees: James Griguol (AUS), Petar Pešić (SRB), Issam Al-Siyabi (OMA)

17 July 2024
20:00

Boxscore

Croatia	59–63	France
Scoring by quarter: 15–18, 22–14, 10–16, 12–15
Pts: Vukosa 20; Rebs: Vukosa 12; Asts: Bilić 5		Pts: Loubens 17; Rebs: Bentoumi 13; Asts: Loubens 4

Inforum, Irapuato
Attendance: 613
Referees: Orlando Varela (HON), Leong Chuen Wing (SGP), Larissa Sales (BRA)

17 July 2024
20:30

Boxscore

Spain	83–32	Mexico
Scoring by quarter: 14–13, 32–4, 14–7, 23–8
Pts: Domínguez 16; Rebs: Domínguez 9 Asts: Cargol 5		Pts: Acuña 11; Rebs: LeBarón 6 Asts: three players 3

Domo de la Feria, León
Attendance: 473
Referees: Ventsislav Velikov (BUL), Edwin Quiles (PUR), Hu Jing (CHN)

=== 9–16th classification playoffs ===
Classification quarterfinals
19 July
Mexico	80
Chinese Taipei	95
19 July
New Zealand	79
Puerto Rico	76
19 July
Mali	52
Egypt	55
19 July
Argentina	73
Croatia	91

Classification semifinals
20 July
Chinese Taipei	70
New Zealand	66
20 July
Egypt	51
Croatia	91

Ninth place match
21 July
Chinese Taipei	76
Croatia	86
Eleventh place match
21 July
New Zealand	59
Egypt	62

Classification semifinals
20 July
Mexico	61
Puerto Rico	65
20 July
Mali	78
Argentina	67

13th place match
21 July
Puerto Rico	54
Mali	65
15th place match
21 July
Mexico	75
Argentina	57

==== 9–16th place quarterfinals ====
19 July 2024
12:30

Boxscore

Mali	52–55	Egypt
Scoring by quarter: 15–15, 10–12, 10–16, 17–12
Pts: Keita 11; Rebs: Mariko 13; Asts: Keita, Dembélé 4		Pts: El-Baz 14; Rebs: Ahmed, Abouelghait 13; Asts: Abouelghait 3

Inforum, Irapuato
Attendance: 116
Referees: Fernando Calatrava (ESP), Yana Nikogossyan (KAZ), Claudio Eiuba (ARG)

19 July 2024
15:00

Boxscore

Argentina	73–91	Croatia
Scoring by quarter: 16–21, 19–18, 18–25, 20–27
Pts: Barrionuevo 17; Rebs: Morell 11; Asts: Barrionuevo, Depetris 5		Pts: Bilić 24; Rebs: Vukosa 20; Asts: four players 4

Inforum, Irapuato
Attendance: 100
Referees: Juozas Barkauskas (LTU), Kevin Lei (CAN), Martin Davison (NZL)

19 July 2024
17:30

Boxscore

New Zealand	79–76	Puerto Rico
Scoring by quarter: 32–14, 21–10, 12–23, 14–29
Pts: Flavell 24; Rebs: Flavell 7 Asts: Flavell 8		Pts: Robles 27; Rebs: De Leon 7 Asts: Robles 6

Inforum, Irapuato
Attendance: 624
Referees: Franko Gracin (CRO), Larissa Sales (BRA), Hu Jing (CHN)

19 July 2024
20:00

Boxscore

Mexico	80–95	Chinese Taipei
Scoring by quarter: 13–27, 20–21, 26–30, 21–17
Pts: Castillo 27; Rebs: Castillo 14; Asts: Acuña 11		Pts: Pan 21; Rebs: Wang 7 Asts: Pan 8

Inforum, Irapuato
Attendance: 1,800
Referees: Leong Chuen Wing (SGP), Alexandra-Ioana Stan (ROU), Issam Al-Siyabi (OMA)

==== 13–16th place semifinals ====
20 July 2024
12:30

Boxscore

Mali	78–67	Argentina
Scoring by quarter: 16–12, 18–17, 18–26, 26–12
Pts: Mariko 23; Rebs: A. Samake 14; Asts: Diarra 6		Pts: Canello 18; Rebs: Canello 10; Asts: Barrionuevo 7

Inforum, Irapuato
Attendance: 100
Referees: Juozas Barkauskas (LTU), Alexandra-Ioana Stan (ROU), Martin Davison (NZL)

20 July 2024
15:00

Boxscore

Mexico	61–65	Puerto Rico
Scoring by quarter: 23–13, 14–18, 11–23, 13–11
Pts: Castillo 18; Rebs: Henry 12; Asts: Acuña 8		Pts: Guerra 17; Rebs: Jackson 7 Asts: Robles 2

Inforum, Irapuato
Attendance: 438
Referees: Franko Gracin (CRO), Issam Al-Siyabi (OMA), Natascha Onono (RSA)

==== 15th place game ====
21 July 2024
10:00

Boxscore

Mexico	75–57	Argentina
Scoring by quarter: 15–16, 19–16, 24–13, 17–12
Pts: Ochoa 16; Rebs: Henry 12; Asts: Acuña 8		Pts: Depetris 16; Rebs: Boullon 8 Asts: Barrionuevo 7

Inforum, Irapuato
Attendance: 300
Referees: Franko Gracin (CRO), Issam Al-Siyabi (OMA), Claudio Eiuba (ARG)

==== 13th place game ====
21 July 2024
12:30

Boxscore

Puerto Rico	54–65	Mali
Scoring by quarter: 10–23, 13–14, 13–12, 18–16
Pts: Guerra, Robles 13; Rebs: Centeno, Robles 5 Asts: Robles 6		Pts: Mariko 19; Rebs: A. Samake 15; Asts: Diarra, Keita 5

Inforum, Irapuato
Attendance: 152
Referees: Leong Chuen Wing (SGP), Kevin Lei (CAN), Yana Nikogossyan (KAZ)

==== 9–12th place semifinals ====
20 July 2024
17:30

Boxscore

Egypt	51–91	Croatia
Scoring by quarter: 2–32, 17–17, 16–25, 16–17
Pts: El-Hemaly 13; Rebs: Abouelghait 10; Asts: El-Gendy 2		Pts: Lea Vukić, Vukosa 18; Rebs: Vukosa 10; Asts: Arnautović 5

Inforum, Irapuato
Attendance: 150
Referees: Leong Chuen Wing (SGP), Kevin Lei (CAN), Larissa Sales (BRA)

20 July 2024
20:00

Boxscore

Chinese Taipei	70–66	New Zealand
Scoring by quarter: 18–21, 17–10, 23–13, 12–22
Pts: Peng 19; Rebs: Pan, Peng 10; Asts: Peng 5		Pts: Flavell 15; Rebs: Sefo 11; Asts: Flavell 4

Inforum, Irapuato
Attendance: 235
Referees: Fernando Calatrava (ESP), Yana Nikogossyan (KAZ), Jesús López (MEX)

==== Eleventh place game ====
21 July 2024
15:00

Boxscore

New Zealand	59–62	Egypt
Scoring by quarter: 23–17, 13–12, 9–14, 14–19
Pts: Flavell 16; Rebs: Sefo 9 Asts: Hokianga 10		Pts: Abouelghait 19; Rebs: Abouelghait 9 Asts: El-Goly 6

Inforum, Irapuato
Attendance: 500
Referees: Fernando Calatrava (ESP), Larissa Sales (BRA), Larissa Sales (BRA)

==== Ninth place game ====
21 July 2024
17:30

Boxscore

Chinese Taipei	76–86	Croatia
Scoring by quarter: 23–21, 14–24, 15–23, 24–18
Pts: Peng 19; Rebs: Hsu Yu-s. 9 Asts: Peng 9		Pts: Vukosa 31; Rebs: Vukosa 24; Asts: Arnautović, Bilić 5

Inforum, Irapuato
Attendance: 193
Referees: Juozas Barkauskas (LTU), Alexandra-Ioana Stan (ROU), Martin Davison (NZL)

=== Quarterfinals ===
19 July 2024
13:00

Boxscore

Italy	51–83	France
Scoring by quarter: 11-27, 15-15, 11-18, 14-23
Pts: Mohamud 17; Rebs: D'Este 7 Asts: Ostoni 4		Pts: Cisse 17; Rebs: Bentoumi 9 Asts: Risacher 6

Domo de la Feria, León
Attendance: 143
Referees: Mihkel Männiste (EST), Aline García (URU), Ruben Woolcock (AUS)

19 July 2024
15:30

Boxscore

Japan	59–95	United States
Scoring by quarter: 12–28, 11–22, 19–13, 17–32
Pts: Goto 19; Rebs: Abe 6 Asts: Yamada 4		Pts: Robinson 29; Rebs: Woliczko 17; Asts: Bjorn 7

Domo de la Feria, León
Attendance: 102
Referees: James Griguol (AUS), Paulina Gajdosz (POL), Yezig Carreño (COL)

19 July 2024
18:00

Boxscore

Spain	71–58	Australia
Scoring by quarter: 15–11, 21–14, 15–17, 20–16
Pts: Okeke 28; Rebs: Okeke 10; Asts: G. García 8		Pts: Perkins 13; Rebs: Petrie 6 Asts: Lehmann, Perkins 2

Domo de la Feria, León
Attendance: 361
Referees: Orlando Varela (HON), Çisil Güngör (TUR), Petar Pešić (SRB)

19 July 2024
20:30

Boxscore

Finland	44–82	Canada
Scoring by quarter: 15–24, 9–13, 9–18, 11–27
Pts: Luukkanen, Talonen 11; Rebs: Ogun 7 Asts: Talonen 3		Pts: Makeer 15; Rebs: Prawl 8 Asts: Arije 3

Domo de la Feria, León
Attendance: 205
Referees: Ventsislav Velikov (BUL), Silvia Marziali (ITA), Franco Ronconi (ARG)

=== 5–8th classification playoffs ===
Classification semifinals
20 July
Australia	78
Finland	61
20 July
Japan	66
Italy	60

Fifth place match
21 July
Australia	67
Japan	64
Seventh place match
21 July
Finland	64
Italy	73

==== 5–8th place semifinals ====
20 July 2024
12:00

Boxscore

Japan	66–60	Italy
Scoring by quarter: 22–15, 19–21, 15–14, 10–10
Pts: Goto 24; Rebs: three players 6 Asts: Suzuki 4		Pts: Mohamud 22; Rebs: Mohamud 13; Asts: D'Este, Mohamud 3

Domo de la Feria, León
Attendance: 50
Referees: Petar Pešić (SRB), Çisil Güngör (TUR), Franco Ronconi (ARG)

20 July 2024
14:30

Boxscore

Australia	78–61	Finland
Scoring by quarter: 21–22, 21–11, 13–16, 23–12
Pts: Somfai 19; Rebs: Ryan 8 Asts: Perkins 10		Pts: Loukola, Mace 12; Rebs: Ogun 8 Asts: Talonen 3

Domo de la Feria, León
Attendance: 115
Referees: Edwin Quiles (PUR), Orlando Varela (HON), Aline García (URU)

==== Seventh place game ====
21 July 2024
12:00

Boxscore

Finland	64–73	Italy
Scoring by quarter: 13–17, 13–23, 20–18, 18–15
Pts: Ogun 12; Rebs: Ogun 14; Asts: Luukkanen 4		Pts: D'Este 13; Rebs: D'Este 16; Asts: Giacchetti 10

Domo de la Feria, León
Attendance: 75
Referees: Petar Pešić (SRB), Aline García (URU), Franco Ronconi (ARG)

==== Fifth place game ====
21 July 2024
14:30

Boxscore

Australia	67–64	Japan
Scoring by quarter: 18–16, 15–15, 23–21, 11–12
Pts: Ryan 25; Rebs: Perkins 8 Asts: Russell 6		Pts: Hamada 23; Rebs: Yamada 7 Asts: Hamada 3

Domo de la Feria, León
Attendance: 75
Referees: Ventsislav Velikov (BUL), Orlando Varela (HON), Lee Ji-youn (KOR)

=== Semifinals ===
20 July 2024
17:30

Boxscore

United States	84–66	France
Scoring by quarter: 14–24, 16–16, 25–15, 29–11
Pts: Robinson 29; Rebs: Robinson 11; Asts: Woliczko 3		Pts: Risacher 20; Rebs: Risacher 8 Asts: Bentoumi 3

Domo de la Feria, León
Attendance: 400
Referees: Ventsislav Velikov (BUL), Lee Ji-youn (KOR), Yezig Carreño (COL)

20 July 2024
20:30

Boxscore

Spain	73–77	Canada
Scoring by quarter: 20–11, 19–23, 18–20, 16–23
Pts: Sanz 17; Rebs: Mouriño 8 Asts: G. García 7		Pts: Makeer 21; Rebs: Makeer 12; Asts: Prawl 7

Domo de la Feria, León
Attendance: 528
Referees: James Griguol (AUS), Silvia Marziali (ITA), Ruben Woolcock (AUS)

=== Third place game ===
21 July 2024
17:30

Boxscore

Spain	47–39	France
Scoring by quarter: 14–18, 14–6, 6–5, 13–10
Pts: I. García 15; Rebs: Monje 10; Asts: Monje 4		Pts: Broliron 11; Rebs: Risacher 10; Asts: Kavoka 3

Domo de la Feria, León
Attendance: 300
Referees: Ruben Woolcock (AUS), Edwin Quiles (PUR), Çisil Güngör (TUR)

=== Final ===
21 July 2024
20:30

Boxscore

Canada	64–84	United States
Scoring by quarter: 17–16, 13–25, 21–18, 13–25
Pts: Swords 15; Rebs: Makeer 10; Asts: Denis 3		Pts: Robinson 25; Rebs: Palmer 12; Asts: Abii 5

Domo de la Feria, León
Attendance: 2,273
Referees: Mihkel Männiste (EST), Paulina Gajdosz (POL), James Griguol (AUS)

== Final ranking ==
Rank	Team	Record
1st place, gold medalist(s)	United States	7–0
2nd place, silver medalist(s)	Canada	6–1
3rd place, bronze medalist(s)	Spain	6–1
4th	France	4–3
5th	Australia	5–2
6th	Japan	4–3
7th	Italy	5–2
8th	Finland	2–5
9th	Croatia	4–3
10th	Chinese Taipei	3–4
11th	Egypt	2–5
12th	New Zealand	3–4
13th	Mali	3–4
14th	Puerto Rico	1–6
15th	Mexico	1–6
16th	Argentina	0–7

== Statistics and awards ==
=== Statistical leaders ===
==== Players ====
Points

Name	PPG
(United States) Jerzy Robinson	20.9
(Croatia) Olivia Vukoša	19.4
(New Zealand) Bailey Flavell	18.9
(Canada) Agot Makeer	17.7
(Canada) Savannah Swords	16.3

Rebounds

Name	RPG
(Croatia) Olivia Vukoša	15.6
(Finland) Nicole Ogun	11.3
(Italy) Emma D'este	9.7
(United States) McKenna Woliczko	9.6
(Mali) Assan Bagnine Mariko	9.0

Assists

Name	APG
(Mexico) Sofia Acuña	6.7
(Spain) Gina García	5.1
(Japan) Sara Yamada	5.1
(Italy) Emma Giacchetti	5.1
(Argentina) Juana Barrionuevo	4.4

Blocks

Name	BPG
(Croatia) Olivia Vukoša	2.6
(Spain) Sara Okeke	2.0
(Australia) Sitaya Fagan	1.9
(Spain) Leyre Urdiain	1.4
(Argentina) Milagros Morell	1.4
(Canada) Deniya Prawl	1.4

Steals

Name	SPG
(Canada) Agot Makeer	4.0
(Mexico) Sofia Acuña	3.3
(Canada) Savannah Swords	3.1
(Italy) Emma Giacchetti	3.1
(Puerto Rico) Adriana Robles	3.0

Efficiency

Name	EFFPG
(Croatia) Olivia Vukoša	29.0
(Canada) Agot Makeer	20.9
(Canada) Savannah Swords	20.1
(United States) McKenna Woliczko	19.1
(New Zealand) Bailey Flavell	17.6

==== Teams ====
Points

Team	PPG
United States	100.4
Canada	83.1
Croatia	76.1
Spain	73.0
Australia	72.9

Rebounds

Team	RPG
United States	62.4
Spain	54.7
Italy	52.4
Canada	50.9
Finland	50.9

Assists

Team	APG
Spain	20.6
United States	19.7
Canada	17.4
Mexico	17.3
Italy	17.1

Blocks

Team	BPG
Croatia	5.4
Australia	5.3
Spain	5.1
France	4.6
Italy	4.6

Steals

Team	SPG
Mali	16.0
United States	16.0
Canada	16.0
Puerto Rico	13.1
Chinese Taipei	13.1

Efficiency

Team	EFFPG
United States	126.4
Canada	99.9
Spain	93.0
Australia	85.6
Italy	78.9

=== Awards ===
The awards were announced on 21 July 2024.

All-Star Five
Guards	Forwards	Center
(United States) Jerzy Robinson (Canada) Agot Makeer (France) Aïnhoa Risacher	(United States) McKenna Woliczko	(Spain) Sara Okeke
MVP: (United States) Jerzy Robinson
All-Second Team
Guards	Forwards	Center
(Canada) Savannah Swords (Japan) Sara Yamada	(Croatia) Olivia Vukoša (United States) Jordyn Palmer (Spain) Inés García	N/A
Best defensive player: (Croatia) Olivia Vukoša
Best coach: (Canada) Fabienne Blizzard
