= Sarah Cissé =

French basketball player (born 2007)

No. 19 – Basket Lattes
- Position: Center
- League: LBWL

Personal information
- Born: 26 January 2007 (age 19)
- Listed height: 6 ft 3 in (1.91 m)

Career information
- Playing career: 2022–present

Career history
- 2022–2025: Centre Fédéral
- 2025–present: Basket Lattes

Career highlights
- Nike Hoop Summit (2025)

Sarah Cissé (born 26 January 2007) is a French professional basketball player for Basket Lattes of the La Boulangère Wonderligue (LBWL) and member of the France women's national basketball team.

== Playing career ==
Cissé began her career with for Centre Fédéral de Basket-ball in 2022, and played for the team for three years. During the 2024–25 season she averaged 11.3 points and 8.3 rebounds per game and was named the Ligue Féminine 2 (LF2) Best Young Player. On 23 May 2025, she signed with Basket Lattes Montpellier Agglomération (BLMA) of the La Boulangère Wonderligue. She represented team World at the 2025 Nike Hoop Summit.

During the 2025–26 season she was named the MVP of the Month for October 2025. On 16 October 2025, against BDS Dinamo Sassari she recorded 23 points on 8 of 11 shooting and five rebounds. On 23 October 2025, against ŽKK Ragusa she recorded 28 points on 11 of 13 shooting, along with eight rebounds and two steals. On 29 October 2025 against KP Brno, she recorded 14 points and seven rebounds.

== National team career ==
Cissé represented France at the 2022 FIBA U16 Women's European Championship where she averaged 5.4 points and 5.6 rebounds per game and won a gold medal. In July 2024, she represented France at the 2024 FIBA Under-17 Women's Basketball World Cup where she averaged 11.1 point and 6.6 rebounds per game. The next month she competed at the 2024 FIBA U18 Women's EuroBasket where she averaged 9.7 points and 5.1 rebounds per game and won a gold medal.

She represented France at the 2025 FIBA Under-19 Women's Basketball World Cup where she averaged 13.3 points and 8.8 rebounds per game.

In July 2026, she represented France at the 2026 FIBA U20 Women's EuroBasket where she averaged a tournament double-double of 15.4 points and 10.0 rebounds per game. During the final against Israel, she recorded 15 points and 23 rebounds and won a gold medal. She was subsequently named tournament MVP.
