= Savvy Swords =

Canadian basketball player (born 2008)

No. 21 – Kentucky Wildcats
- Position: Forward
- Conference: Southeastern Conference

Personal information
- Born: January 18, 2008 (age 18) Sudbury, Ontario
- Listed height: 6 ft 2 in (1.88 m)

Career information
- High school: Long Island Lutheran (Brookville, New York)
- College: Kentucky (2026–present)

Career highlights
- McDonald's All-American (2026)
Medals
Women's basketball
Representing Canada
FIBA Under-18 AmeriCup
Silver medal – second place	2026 Mexico	Team
FIBA Under-17 World Cup
Silver medal – second place	2024 Mexico	Team
FIBA Under-16 Americas Championship
Silver medal – second place	2023 Mexico	Team

Savannah Swords (born January 18, 2008) is a Canadian college basketball player for the Kentucky Wildcats of the Southeastern Conference (SEC). She is the daughter of Shawn Swords and younger sister of Syla Swords.

== High school career ==
Swords attends Long Island Lutheran. During her junior year she averaged 16 points, 13 rebounds, four assists and three steals per game in five games, before suffering a season-ending injury. She tore her ACL in December 2024, and underwent surgery in January 2025.

On June 23, 2025, Swords committed to play college basketball at Kentucky. On February 2, 2026, she was selected to play in the 2026 McDonald's All-American Girls Game.

== National team career ==
Swords represented Canada at the 2023 FIBA Under-16 Women's Americas Championship where she averaged 13.3 points, 5.8 rebounds and 1.8 assists per game and won a silver medal. During the gold medal game against the United States she scored a team-high 22 points.

She represented Canada at the 2024 FIBA Under-17 Women's Basketball World Cup where she averaged 16.3 points, six rebounds, 3.1 steals and 2.3 assists per game, and won a silver medal. During the gold medal game against the United States, she scored a team-high 15 points, along with six rebounds, three blocks and a steal. Following the tournament she was named to the FIBA U17 World Cup All-Second Team.

== Personal life ==
Savvy is the daughter of Shawn Swords and Shelley Dewar. Her father, Shawn, is a former professional basketball player and was the head coach at Laurentian University from 2007 to 2022. He currently serves as associate head coach for the Long Island Nets of the NBA G League. Her mother, Shelley, played college basketball for the Laurentian Voyageurs women's basketball team, and was the Ontario conference rookie of the year in 1995. Her older sister, Syla, plays college basketball at Michigan.
