= Olivia Vukoša =

Croatian basketball player (born 2008)

No. 25 – UConn Huskies
- Position: Center
- Conference: Big East Conference

Personal information
- Born: September 7, 2008 (age 18) Whitestone, New York, U.S.
- Listed height: 6 ft 4 in (1.93 m)

Career information
- High school: Christ the King (Middle Village, New York)
- College: UConn (2026–present)

Career highlights
- Gatorade National Player of the Year (2026); McDonald's All-American (2026)

Olivia Vukoša (born September 7, 2008) is a Croatian college basketball player for the UConn Huskies of the Big East Conference. She attended Christ the King Regional High School was considered the No. 3 recruit in the class of 2026 by ESPN.

== High school career ==
Vukoša attends Christ the King Regional High School. During her junior year she averaged 19.4 points, 17.9 rebounds, 5.5 blocks and 3.8 assists per game. She led Christ the King to a Catholic High School Athletic Association Tier 1 New York City Tournament title. Following the season she was named the New York Gatorade Player of the Year.

On February 2, 2026, she was selected to play in the 2026 McDonald's All-American Girls Game. During her senior year she averaged 17.8 points, 18.1 rebounds, 5.5 assists and 4.4 blocks per game, and led Christ the King to the Catholic High School Athletic Association state championship game. Following the season she was named New York Gatorade Player of the Year for the second consecutive year and the Gatorade National Player of the Year.

=== Recruiting ===
Vukoša's top five choices included UConn, South Carolina, LSU, Texas and Ohio State. On October 21, 2025, she committed to play college basketball at Uconn, and signed her National Letter of Intent on November 12, 2025.

== National team career ==
Vukoša made her national team debut for Croatia at the 2023 FIBA U16 Women's European Championship where she averaged 22.6 points and 17.1 rebounds per game and was named to the All-Star 5.

She represented Croatia at the 2024 FIBA Under-17 Women's Basketball World Cup where she averaged a double-double of 19.4 points, 15.6 rebounds, 2.6 blocks and 2.6 assists per game. On July 13, 2024, in a game against Puerto Rico, she scored 21 point and 23 rebounds to help Croatia earn their first FIBA Under-17 Women's Basketball World Cup win in history. Her 16 defensive rebounds were the most ever in the history of the competition, while her 23 rebounds was tied for second-most in the tournament's history. She became the sixth player to record at least 20 rebounds in a single Under-17 Women's Basketball World Cup game. On July 21, 2024, during the ninth place game against Chinese Taipei, she posted a double-double of 31 points and 24 rebounds, along with six blocked shots, three steals and two assists. She became the first player to achieve a performance efficiency valuation of 50, surpassing the previous record of 46 set by Toby Fournier during the 2022 FIBA Under-17 Women's Basketball World Cup. Following the tournament she was named to the FIBA U17 World Cup All-Second Team and Best Defensive Player.

She represented Croatia at the 2025 FIBA U20 Women's EuroBasket Division B at 16 years old and averaged 15.6 points and 9.1 rebounds per game. During the bronze medal game against Bulgaria she scored 35 points and 22 rebounds in 23 minutes in an 82–78 victory. With the win, she helped Croatia get promoted to Division A for the 2026 FIBA U20 Women's EuroBasket.

== Personal life ==
Vukoša is the daughter of Damir and Jenny, and has three sisters, Mateja, Maddy and Gabby. Both sets of her grandparents immigrated from Croatia to the United States. Her parents became Croatian citizens and helped their children also earn citizenship.
