= Madison Ryan =

Australian basketball player (born 2009)

No. 53 – Sandringham Sabres
- Position: Forward
- League: NBL1 South

Personal information
- Born: 31 March 2009 (age 17)
- Listed height: 6 ft 3 in (1.91 m)

Career information
- Playing career: 2024–present

Career history
- 2024–present: Sandringham Sabres

Career highlights
- NBL1 South Youth Player of the Year (2026)
Medals
Women's basketball
Representing Australia
FIBA Under-18 Asia Cup
| Gold medal – first place | 2026 Malaysia | Team |
FIBA Under-19 World Cup
| Silver medal – second place | 2025 Czech Republic | Team |
FIBA Under-17 World Cup
| Bronze medal – third place | 2026 Czech Republic | Team |

Madison Kathleen Ryan (born 31 March 2009) is an Australian professional basketball player for the Sandringham Sabres of the NBL1 South. She helped the Australian Gems win silver at the 2025 FIBA Under-19 World Cup and bronze at the 2026 FIBA Under-17 World Cup.

== Playing career ==
During the 2026 season with the Sandringham Sabres of the NBL1 South she averaged 17.7 points, 7.1 rebounds and 2.4 assists per game and was named the NBL1 South Youth Player of the Year and to the All-NBL1 South Second Team.

== National team career ==
On 30 May 2024, Ryan was selected to represent Australia at the 2024 FIBA Under-17 Women's Basketball World Cup. During the tournament she averaged 10.4 points, 5.3 rebounds, and 1.7 assists per game.

In July 2025, she competed at the 2025 FIBA Under-19 Women's Basketball World Cup where she was the youngest member on the team. She started the first group stage game against Brazil, and scored a game-high 22 points. During the tournament she averaged nine points, 3.3 rebounds and 1.2 assists per game and won a silver medal. In September 2025, she competed at the 2025 FIBA U16 Women's Asia Cup where she averaged 15.2 points, 3.6 rebounds and 3.8 assists per game and won a gold medal. During the final against New Zealand she scored a team-high 15 points, along with five rebounds, four assists, and five steals and was subsequently named to the All-Star Five. In December 2025, she competed at the 2025 FIBA Under-17 Oceania Cup and won a gold medal.

She represented Australia at the 2026 FIBA Under-17 Women's Basketball World Cup where she averaged 14.1 points, 6.0 rebounds, 2.9 assists, 1.4 steals and 1.3 blocks per game and won a bronze medal. During the bronze medal game against Canada, she scored a team-high 15 points, along with eight rebounds and four assists. She scored in double-figures in all seven games and was named to the FIBA U17 World Cup All-First Team.
