= Long Island Nets =

American professional basketball team of the NBA G League

- Conference: Eastern
- League: NBA G League
- Founded: 2016
- History: Long Island Nets; 2016–present
- Arena: Nassau Coliseum
- Location: Uniondale, New York
- Team colors: Blue, red, white
- Team manager: Matt MacDonald
- Head coach: Shawn Swords
- Ownership: Brooklyn Nets
- Affiliation: Brooklyn Nets
- Championships: 0
- Conference titles: 1 (2019)
- Division titles: 1 (2019)
- Retired numbers: 1 (32)
- Website: longisland.gleague.nba.com
Home	Away

The Long Island Nets are an American professional basketball team in the NBA G League based in Uniondale, New York. They are affiliated with the Brooklyn Nets, and play their home games at the Nassau Coliseum. The Nets became the twelfth Development League team to be owned by an NBA team when it was announced in 2015.

== History ==
In June 2015, the Brooklyn Nets announced their intentions to purchase a D-League affiliate. The team announced on November 5, 2015, that they reached an agreement for their new D-League team, called the Long Island Nets, to play in a renovated Nassau Veterans Memorial Coliseum, which was the home of the Nets during their ABA years. However, due to renovations, the new team played in their parent team's home, Barclays Center, for their first season.

On March 24, 2016, the Nets hired Alton Byrd as the vice president of business operations. On April 15, 2016, Ronald Nored was hired as the team's head coach and on August 23, 2016, Ryan Gomes and Pat Rafferty were announced as assistant coaches. On November 12, 2016, the Nets won their first game after defeating the Canton Charge 120–118.

While continuing to play and brand as Long Island, the team would also begin a series of "home" games played at Place Bell in Laval, Quebec under the alternate brand Les Nets Montreal beginning in the 2025 season, following a partnership between Nets ownership and the Molson family, who operate the Laval facility for their Montreal Canadiens minor league affiliate the Laval Rocket.

== Season-by-season ==
Season	Division	Regular reason				Postseason results
Season	Division	Finish	Wins	Losses	Pct.	Postseason results
Long Island Nets
2016–17	Atlantic	5th	17	33	.340	
2017–18	Atlantic	3rd	27	23	.540	
2018–19	Atlantic	1st	34	16	.680	Won Conference Semifinal (Raptors) 112–99; Won Conference Final (Lakeland) 108–106; Lost League Finals (Rio Grande Valley) 1–2
2019–20	Atlantic	4th	19	23	.452	Season cancelled by COVID-19 pandemic
2020–21	—	10th	7	8	.467	
2021–22	Eastern	6th	18	15	.545	Lost Conference Quarterfinal (Delaware) 116–133
2022–23	Eastern	1st	23	9	.719	Won Conference Semifinal (Cleveland) 111–107; Lost Conference Final (Delaware) 94–108
2023–24	Eastern	5th	19	15	.559	Won Conference Quarterfinal (Capital City) 120–118; Won Conference Semifinal (Osceola) 120–112; Lost Conference Final (Maine) 77–99
2024–25	Eastern	10th	17	17	.500	
2025–26	Eastern	8th	18	18	.500	Lost Conference Quarterfinal (Osceola) 117–119
Regular season record			199	177	.529	
Playoff record			6	6	.500	

== Current roster ==
Long Island Nets roster
Players

Pos.	No.	Player	Height	Weight	DOB	From
F/C	–	Tyler Bilodeau (TW)	6 ft 9 in (2.06 m)	230 lb (104 kg)	2004-04-17	UCLA
G	6	Hunter Cattoor	6 ft 3 in (1.91 m)	200 lb (91 kg)	2000-11-17	Virginia Tech
G	–	Tidjiane Dioumassi	6 ft 4 in (1.93 m)	200 lb (91 kg)		Western Carolina Catamounts
G	–	Dwight Murray	6 ft 0 in (1.83 m)	180 lb (82 kg)	2000-01-31	Rider
F	31	Chaney Johnson (TW)	6 ft 7 in (2.01 m)	220 lb (100 kg)	2002-06-20	Auburn
G	24	Jamal Mashburn Jr.	6 ft 2 in (1.88 m)	195 lb (88 kg)	2001-09-29	Temple
C	15	David Muoka	6 ft 10 in (2.08 m)	235 lb (107 kg)	2000-12-14	UNLV
F/C	22	Grant Nelson (TW)	7 ft 0 in (2.13 m)	215 lb (98 kg)	2002-03-18	Alabama
G/F	20	Jahlil White	6 ft 7 in (2.01 m)	210 lb (95 kg)	2001-12-02	La Salle

Coaches
Head coach
- Mfon Udofia
Assistant(s)
- Thomas Bridges
- Jorge Gutiérrez
- Steven Kaner
- Shawn Swords (Associate HC)

Legend
- (DP) Unsigned draft pick
- (FA) Free agent
- (S) Suspended
- (P) Prospects
- (NBA) On assignment from NBA affiliate
- (TW) Two-way affiliate player
- Injured

Roster
Updated: April 3, 2026

== Head coaches ==
#	Head coach	Term	Regular season				Playoffs				Achievements
#	Head coach	Term	G	W	L	Win%	G	W	L	Win%	Achievements
1	Ronald Nored	2016–2018	100	44	56	.440	—	—	—	—	
2	Will Weaver	2018–2019	50	34	16	.680	5	3	2	.600	
3	Shaun Fein	2019–2020	42	19	23	.452	—	—	—	—	
4	Bret Brielmaier	2020–2021	15	7	8	.467	—	—	—	—	
5	Adam Caporn	2021–2022	33	18	15	.545	1	0	1	.000	
6	Ronnie Burrell	2022–2023	32	23	9	.719	2	1	1	.500	
7	Mfon Udofia	2023–2026	68	36	32	.529	3	2	1	.667	
8	Shawn Swords	2026–present				–				–	

== NBA affiliates ==
- Brooklyn Nets (2016–present)
