= The Sword, Gloucester =

Pub in Gloucester, Gloucestershire, England

Coordinates: 51°51′58″N 2°14′51″W

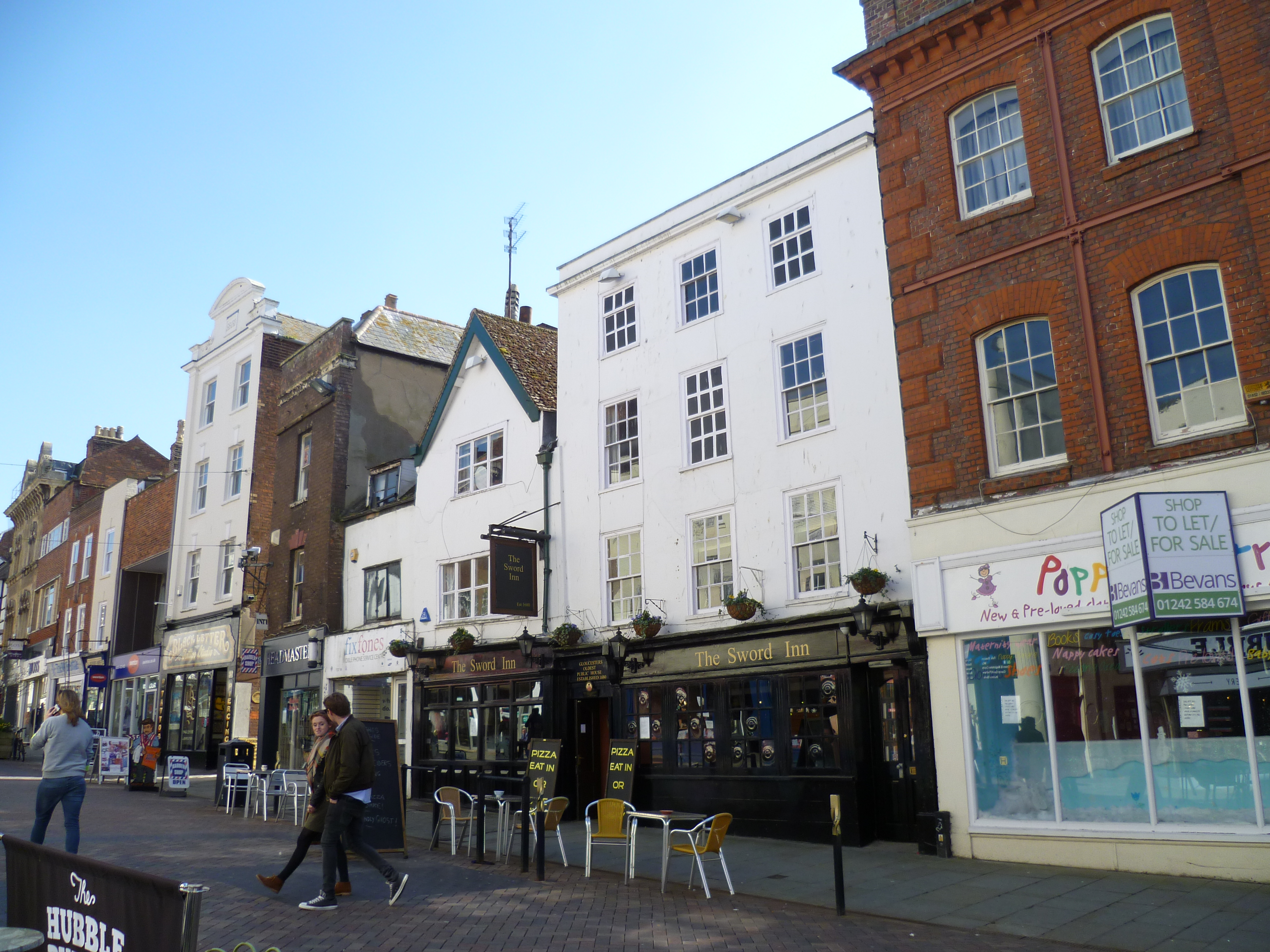
The Sword

The Sword is a public house at 43 and 45 Westgate Street, Gloucester, England, that is a grade II listed building with Historic England. It was formerly known as The Union and Molly's Bar.
