= Cearah Parchment =

Canadian basketball player (born 2007)

No. 30 – Illinois Fighting Illini
- Position: Forward
- League: Big Ten Conference

Personal information
- Born: July 4, 2007 (age 19) Whitby, Ontario, Canada
- Listed height: 6 ft 3 in (1.91 m)

Career information
- High school: Fort Erie International Academy (Fort Erie, Ontario)
- College: Illinois (2025–present)

Career highlights
- Big Ten All-Freshman Team (2026)
Medals
Women's basketball
Representing Canada
FIBA Under-17 World Cup
Silver medal – second place	2024 Mexico	Team
FIBA Under-16 Americas Championship
Silver medal – second place	2023 Mexico	Team

Cearah Parchment (born July 4, 2007) is a Canadian college basketball player for the Illinois Fighting Illini of the Big Ten Conference.

== Early life and high school career ==
Parchment was born in Whitby, Ontario, Canada to Kevin and Loriann Hottot-Parchment, and has an older brother, Aiden. She attended Fort Erie International Academy.

She was a four-star recruit and signed her National Letter of Intent (NLI) to play college basketball at Illinois on November 13, 2024.

== College career ==
On November 30, 2025, against Le Moyne, Parchment recorded 17 points and a career-high 10 steals. Her ten steals tied the program's single-game record and was just the second points-steals double-double in program history, following Shavonna Hunter on December 18, 1999. On December 2, 2025, against Bellarmine, she recorded 16 points, 12 rebounds, three assists and three steals in 21 minutes. The next game against Indiana on December 6, she recorded 15 points and 13 rebounds for another double-double. She averaged 15.5 points and 12.5 rebounds in the two games and was named Big Ten Freshman of the Week. On January 1, 2026, against No. 7 Maryland, she recorded 17 points, eight rebounds, three steals and three blocks to upset Maryland 73–70 for their highest ranked win over a Big Ten opponent in program history. She earned her second Big Ten Freshman of the Week honor.

On January 24, 2026, against Nebraska, she scored a then career-high 25 points and 11 rebounds for her sixth double-double of the season. She subsequently earned her third Big Ten Freshman of the Week honor. The next game against No. 2 UCLA on January 28, 2026, she scored a career-high 26 points. On February 11, 2026, against Wisconsin, she recorded 12 points and a career-high 15 rebounds. On February 17, 2026, against Rutgers she recorded 20 points, 10 rebounds, four assists, four steals and one block with zero turnovers. The next game against Northwestern on February 22, 2026, she recorded 19 points, 10 rebounds, three steals and three assists, for her Big Ten leading eleventh double-double. She averaged 19.5 points, 10 rebounds, 3.5 assists, 3.5 steals, over two games, while not committing any turnovers, and earned her fourth Big Ten Freshman of the Week honor. This tied Illinois' program record for the most Big Ten Freshman of the Week awards in a single season.

During her freshman season she averaged 13.8 points, 8.7 rebounds, 1.5 assists, 1.8 steals, and 0.4 blocks per game during the regular season. She tied the program's freshman single-season rebounds record with 251, while her 399 points ranks fourth on the freshman single-season scoring list. Following the season she was named to the Big Ten All-Freshman team.

== National team career ==
Parchment represented Canada at the 2023 FIBA Under-16 Women's Americas Championship and averaged 10.0 points, 6.7 rebounds, 3.5 steals and 2.2 assists per game and won a silver medal. She posted two double-doubles against Mexico and Puerto Rico in the Quarterfinals and Semifinals and was named to the All-Star Five. She then represented Canada at the 2024 FIBA Under-17 Women's Basketball World Cup and averaged 3.9 points, 5.4 rebounds and 2.1 assists per game and won a silver medal.

She represented Canada at the 2025 FIBA Under-19 Women's Basketball World Cup and averaged 8.1 points, 6.0 rebounds and 2.6 assists per game, as Canada lost to Spain 68–70 in the third place game.
