= Shawn Swords =

Canadian basketball player and coach

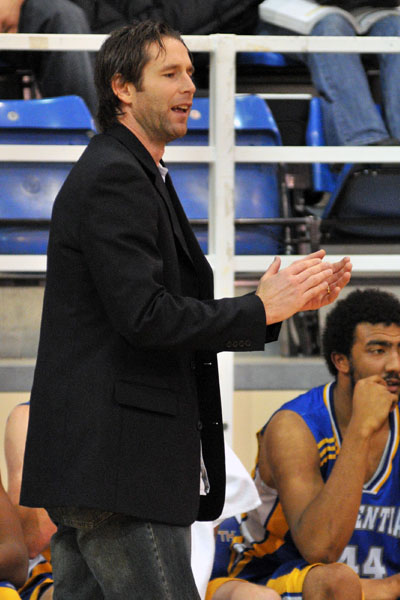
- Shawn Swords coaching the Laurentian Voyageurs.

Long Island Nets
- Position: Head Coach
- League: NBA G League

Personal information
- Listed height: 6 ft 3 in (1.91 m)
- Listed weight: 196 lb (89 kg)

Career history

Coaching
- 2007–2022: Laurentian
- 2022–2023: Long Island Nets (assistant)
- 2023–2026: Long Island Nets (AHC)
- 2026–present: Long Island Nets
Medals
Men's basketball
Representing Canada
Universiade
Bronze medal – third place	1995 Fukuoka	Team
FIBA Americas Championship
Silver medal – second place	1999 San Juan	Team
Bronze medal – third place	2001 Neuquén	Team

Jeffrey Shawn Swords (born December 27, 1973, in Ottawa, Ontario) is a Canadian basketball coach, and former player. As of the 2026–27 NBA G League season he is the head coach for the Long Island Nets. He previously served as head coach of the Laurentian University Voyageurs men's basketball team.

== Playing career ==
He played for Canada at the 2000 Summer Olympics. He also played professionally overseas from 1997 to 2007 in England for the Worthing Bears, and also in France, Italy and on Team Canada.

== Coaching career ==
Swords served as the head coach at Laurentian University from 2007 to 2022.

On October 3, 2022, he was named assistant coach for the Long Island Nets of the NBA G League. On August 10, 2023, he was promoted to associate head coach for the Long Island Nets.

== Personal life ==
His daughters, Syla and Savvy, are both basketball players. Syla plays college basketball at Michigan, while Savvy is committed to play college basketball at Kentucky.
