= Jordyn Palmer =

American basketball player (born 2008)

No. 20 – Westtown School Moose
- League: Friends School League

Personal information
- Born: November 6, 2008 (age 17)
- Listed height: 6 ft 1 in (1.85 m)

Career information
- High school: Westtown School (West Chester, Pennsylvania)

Career highlights
- FIBA U18 Women's AmeriCup MVP (2026)
Medals
Women's basketball
Representing the United States
FIBA U18 AmeriCup
Gold medal – first place	2026 Mexico	Team
FIBA Under-17 World Cup
Gold medal – first place	2024 Mexico	Team

Jordyn Palmer (born November 6, 2008) is an American basketball player who currently attends Westtown School in West Chester, Pennsylvania. She is a five-star recruit and one of the top-ranked players in the 2027 class.

== Early life ==
Jordyn Palmer was born on November 6, 2008, to Kim and Jermaine Palmer via an emergency C-section. She grew up immersed in basketball because her father was an Amateur Athletic Union (AAU) coach, so she often accompanied him to his team's tournaments and decided at age two that she wanted to play professionally. Palmer also played soccer in her youth, but according to her, "basketball won out." She idolized her father’s favorite player, Kobe Bryant. In the third grade, Palmer joined the Chester County Storm AAU program. She was moved up to the under-17 team when she was still in middle school.

In the seventh grade, Palmer was spotted by Fran Burbidge, head basketball coach at Westtown School in West Chester, Pennsylvania, and was offered a full scholarship to the private boarding school. She enrolled the following year, though she had to wake up at 5:30 a.m. to commute from her home in Oxford to the school since middle schoolers could not live on campus. Nevertheless, Palmer earned a starting spot on the varsity team in her second game. In January 2023, she posted 31 points and 13 rebounds in a memorable overtime showdown against Hannah Hidalgo and Paul VI High School. Palmer averaged 15 points and 8.5 rebounds per game and helped her team win the Pennsylvania Independent Schools Athletic Association (PAISAA) state championship title. That offseason, she was invited the inaugural Jr. NBA Showcase in Las Vegas; she was one of 40 elite 13- and 14-year old players from around the world who took part in the week-long event.

As a freshman, Palmer averaged 17.7 points, 11.3 rebounds, 5.8 assists, 4.2 blocks, and 3.2 steals per game, helping Westtown to a 25–2 record and another PAISAA state championship title. She was named the Pennsylvania Gatorade Player of the Year and the Pennsylvania Sports Writers (PSW) Class 3A Player of the Year. As a sophomore, Palmer averaged 21.6 points, 10.5 rebounds, 5.8 assists, 3.1 blocks, and 2.6 steals per game. She helped Westtown to a 27–3 record and its fourth straight PAISAA state championship title, scoring 26 points in their state title game victory over Friends' Central School. In addition to repeating as the Pennsylvania Gatorade Player of the Year, Palmer was also named the MaxPreps Pennsylvania Player of the Year and the PSW Non-PIAA Player of the Year. (Note: This was the first year that the PSW had a separate non-PIAA designation for independent and prep schools.) She also scored her 1,000th career point during the season. As a junior, Palmer averaged 23.2 points, 13.2 rebounds, 6.4 assists, 3.3 steals, and 2.5 blocks per game, leading Westtown to a 28–3 record and an appearance in the PAISAA state championship game, where she scored 27 points in a loss to Friends' Central. She was named the Pennsylvania Gatorade Player of the Year, MaxPreps Pennsylvania Player of the Year, and PSW Non-PIAA Player of the Year.

In the off-seasons, Palmer began playing with the Philly Rise on the Nike Elite Youth Basketball League (EYBL) circuit in 2023. She helped the 16U squad win the 2023 Nike Nationals 16U championship, as well as the 2024 USA Basketball Club Championships. In 2025, Palmer debuted in Overtime Select, a high school girls basketball league for top recruits. Serving as team captain of RWE, she averaged 11.5 points and 6.5 rebounds per game. Palmer also won the Queen of the Court competition at the OT Select Takeover event, defeating Trinity Jones in the final. She returned for her second season in 2026 as captain of the Cold Hearts.

== National team career ==
While in the eighth grade, Palmer tried out for a spot on the United States national under-16 team ahead of the 2023 FIBA Under-16 Women's Americas Championship. She was named a finalist but was ultimately not selected to the roster.

Palmer represented the United States at 2024 FIBA Under-17 Women's Basketball World Cup and won a gold medal. She averaged 10.4 points, 6.3 rebounds, and 2.9 assists per game, and was named to the FIBA U17 World Cup All-Second Team.

Palmer represented the United States at the 2026 FIBA U18 Women's AmeriCup, where she averaged 18.8 points, 7.4 rebounds, and a tournament-high 4.2 steals per game. During the final against Canada she recorded 24 points, 13 rebounds and five steals to help the United States win a gold medal. She was subsequently named tournament MVP.

== Personal life ==
Palmer is the second-oldest of four siblings. In 2024, she donated grant money from her Gatorade Player of the Year award to the Lighthouse Youth Center in her hometown of Oxford, Pennsylvania. "This his is where I grew up playing basketball with all my friends," she said. "This is where I always came to hoop, so I definitely love giving back to the community."
