= Agot Makeer =

Canadian basketball player (born 2007)

No. 44 – South Carolina Gamecocks
- Position: Guard
- League: Southeastern Conference

Personal information
- Born: May 4, 2007 (age 19) Fargo, North Dakota, U.S.
- Listed height: 6 ft 2 in (1.88 m)

Career information
- High school: Crestwood Prep (Toronto, Ontario); Montverde Academy (Montverde, Florida)
- College: South Carolina (2025–present)

Career highlights
- McDonald's All-American (2025); Nike Hoop Summit (2025)
Medals
Women's basketball
Representing Canada
FIBA Under-17 World Cup
Silver medal – second place	2024 Mexico	Team

Agot Makeer (born May 4, 2007) is a Canadian college basketball player for South Carolina.

== Early life and high school career ==
Makeer was born in Fargo, North Dakota, and raised in Thunder Bay, Ontario.

Makeer began her career at Crestwood Preparatory College. During her junior year she averaged 19.3 points, 7.7 rebounds and 2.8 assists. Following her junior year she transferred to Montverde Academy. During her senior year she averaged 10.0 points, 5.7 rebounds, and 2.7 assists per game. On January 27, 2025, she was selected to play in the 2025 McDonald's All-American Girls Game. She also participated in the 2025 Nike Hoop Summit, where she recorded five points, three rebounds, two steals, and a block.

=== Recruiting ===
She was a five-star recruit and ranked the No. 4 player in the class of 2025 by ESPN. On March 1, 2025, Makeer committed to play college basketball at South Carolina. She signed her National Letter of Intent on April 24, 2025.

== College career ==
Makeer made her collegiate debut for South Carolina on November 3, 2025, against Grand Canyon. On November 7, 2025, against Bowling Green, she scored a then career-high 12 points in 16 minutes. On March 21, 2026, during the first round of the 2026 NCAA Division I women's basketball tournament against Southern she scored a then career-high 15 points. During the second round against USC, she tied her career-high of 15 points scored, along with three assists and four steals. During the Elite Eight against TCU she poured in a career-high 18 points off the bench to help South Carolina advance to the Final Four.

In a Final Four victory over the nationally ranked #1 Connecticut Huskies, Makeer posted 14 points on 5-9 shooting in 28 minutes off the bench - including two threes made and two free throws. It was her fifth straight game in the tournament scoring in double figures to that point. Nine of her points came in the second half as the Gamecocks extended their lead after being down by two at halftime.

== National team career ==
Makeer represented Canada at the 2024 FIBA Under-17 Women's Basketball World Cup where she averaged 17.7 points, seven rebounds, and 2.3 assists per game, and won a silver medal. Following the tournament she was named to the FIBA U17 World Cup All-First Team.

On July 9, 2025, she was selected to represent Canada at the 2025 FIBA Under-19 Women's Basketball World Cup. During the tournament she averaged 10.3 points, 4.9 rebounds, two assists and 1.4 steals per game. During the bronze medal game against Spain, she stole the inbound pass With 4.7 seconds left, and missed a would-be game-winning three-point shot as time expired, as Canada lost 68–70.
