= Crossed swords =

Crossed swords may refer to:

== Arts and entertainment ==
- Crossed Swords (1954 film), an Italian film
- "Crossed Swords", an episode of the British sitcom Steptoe and Son
  - "Crossed Swords", the pilot episode of the American sitcom Sanford and Son, based on the Steptoe and Son episode
- The Prince and the Pauper (1977 film), a British film released in the US as Crossed Swords
- Crossed Swords (video game), a 1991 arcade game by ADK
- Crossed Swords (Timemaster), a 1984 role-playing game adventure

== Other uses ==
- ⚔, a Unicode glyph (u+2694), part of the Miscellaneous Symbols Unicode block
- , crossed sword symbol, a map symbol used to indicate the location of a battlefield
- The Victory Arch monument in Baghdad, sometimes referred to as the Crossed Swords
- Meissen porcelein's mark, a logo designed to resemble crossed swords

== See also ==
- Cross of Saint James (Spanish: cruz espada, lit. 'sword cross'), also called "sword cross"
- Sword (disambiguation)
- Cross (disambiguation)
