= Jerzy Robinson =

American basketball player (born 2008)

No. 9 – South Carolina Gamecocks
- Position: Point guard

Personal information
- Born: August 11, 2008 (age 18) Phoenix, Arizona, U.S.
- Listed height: 6 ft 1 in (1.85 m)

Career information
- High school: Desert Vista High School (Phoenix, Arizona); Sierra Canyon (Chatsworth, California)
- College: South Carolina

Career highlights
- McDonald's All-American (2026); Nike Hoop Summit (2026); FIBA Under-17 Women's World Cup MVP (2024); FIBA Under-16 Americas Championship MVP (2023)
Medals
Women's basketball
Representing United States
FIBA Under-19 World Cup
Gold medal – first place	2025 Czech Republic	Team
FIBA Under-17 World Cup
Gold medal – first place	2024 Mexico	Team
FIBA Under-16 Americas Championship
Gold medal – first place	2023 Mexico	Team

Jerzy Elaine Robinson (born August 11, 2008) is an American college basketball player for South Carolina. She attended Sierra Canyon School and was a five-star recruit and one of the top players in the 2026 class.

== High school career ==
Robinson attended Desert Vista High School in Phoenix, Arizona her freshman year, where she averaged 22.0 points and 8.2 rebounds per game on 62% shooting. She helped lead Desert Vista to the first Arizona Interscholastic Association (AIA) basketball Open Division championship. During the championship game she scored 21 points and nine rebounds despite sitting out most of the fourth quarter, in a 63–37 victory. Following the season she was named MaxPreps Arizona High School Girls Basketball Player of the Year.

In June 2023, she announced she would transfer to Sierra Canyon in Chatsworth, California. In January 2024, she signed a NIL deal with Nike. During her sophomore year at Sierra Canyon, she stepped into a starting role after the graduation of JuJu Watkins and averaged 22.5 points and 10.8 rebounds. Following the season she named to the Los Angeles Times All-Star team and the MaxPreps Sophomore All-America Team.

She played for Overtime Select, a new women's basketball league for top high school recruits in August 2024. During her junior year she averaged 27 points and 10.2 rebounds, and then joined the U17 Sports Academy Swish team. She averaged 24.3 points, 6.1 rebounds and 3.1 assists.

On January 17, 2026, Robinson scored 33 points in the Hoophall Classic against Long Island Lutheran High School to become Sierra Canyon's all-time leading scorer, surpassing JuJu Watkins' record of 2,322 points. On February 2, 2026, she was selected to play in the 2026 McDonald's All-American Girls Game. She then competed at the 2026 Nike Hoop Summit where she recorded a game-high tying 19 points, along with Saniyah Hall.

=== Recruiting ===
Robinson is considered a five-star recruit. On December 23, 2025, Robinson committed to play college basketball at South Carolina. On April 15, 2026, she signed with South Carolina.

== National team career ==
Robinson represented the United States at the 2023 FIBA Under-16 Women's Americas Championship and won a gold medal. She averaged 17.3 points, 10.2 rebounds, 2.0 assists and 2.0 steals per game, earning tournament MVP honors. At 14 years old, she was the youngest player to ever win MVP at the tournament. During a game against Colombia she recorded 21 rebounds, setting a USA basketball under-16 single-game record, surpassing the previous record of 16 set by Lauren Betts in 2019.

Robinson represented the United States at the 2024 FIBA Under-17 Women's Basketball World Cup and won a gold medal. She averaged 20.9 points and 6.9 rebounds per games, and was named tournament MVP. During the championship game against Canada she scored a game-high 25 points and seven rebounds.

On June 20, 2025, she was named to the United States under-19 national team for the 2025 FIBA Under-19 Women's Basketball World Cup.

== Personal life ==
Robinson is of Samoan, European, and African American descent. She is the daughter of Taryn Uperesa and Darnell Robinson. Her father was a linebacker and played college football at Oregon State. Robinson is a Christian.
