= 2011 FIBA Under-19 World Championship for Women =

- Official logo of the FIBA Under-19 World Championship for Women 2011

Tournament details
- Host country: Chile
- Cities: Puerto Montt, Puerto Varas
- Dates: 21–31 July 2011
- Teams: 15 (from 5 confederations)
- Venues: 2 (in 2 host cities)

Final positions
- Champions: United States (5th title)

Tournament statistics
- MVP: (Brazil) Damiris Dantas
- Top scorer: (Brazil) Dantas (20.9)
- Top rebounds: (Brazil) Dantas (12.6)
- Top assists: (Japan) Machida (7.2)
- PPG (Team): United States (76.8)
- RPG (Team): United States (47.1)
- APG (Team): United States (16.9)

Official website
- FIBA Under-19 World Championship for Women 2011

The 2011 FIBA Under-19 World Championship for Women was hosted by Chile from July 21 to July 31, 2011. The draw for the Championship took place on March 18, 2011 in Puerto Montt. Teams played a round robin schedule, with the top four teams of the eighth-final four advancing to the knockout stage.

Nigeria did not turn up for the tournament, so the championship just consisted of 15 teams.

== Venues ==
Below is a list of the venues which were used to host games during the 2011 FIBA Under-19 World Championship for Women.

Puerto Montt	Puerto Varas
Arena Puerto Montt	Gimnasio Municipal Puerto Varas

== Group stage ==
Times given below are in Chile Standard Time (UTC−4).

=== Group A ===
Team	Pld	W	L	PF	PA	PD	Pts	Tiebreaker
Canada	3	3	0	250	154	+96	6	
Italy	3	2	1	195	195	0	5	
China	3	1	2	206	213	−7	4	
Egypt	3	0	3	177	266	−89	3	

21 July 2011
11:15

Report

Canada	76–49	China
Scoring by quarter: 23–6, 18–10, 24–19, 11–14
Pts: Fields 22; Rebs: Fields 9 Asts: Williams, Plouffe 2		Pts: Liang Jiamei 12; Rebs: Yu Dong 6 Asts: Yang Liwei 4

Arena Puerto Montt, Puerto Montt
Referees: Tomas Jasevicius (LTU), Carole Delauné (FRA), Fabricio Leonardo Vito (ARG)

21 July 2011
20:15

Report

Italy	74–56	Egypt
Scoring by quarter: 26–9, 14–14, 19–21, 15–12
Pts: Dotto 15; Rebs: Diene 10; Asts: Carangelo 4		Pts: Amer 22; Rebs: Amer 11; Asts: Massoud 3

Arena Puerto Montt, Puerto Montt
Referees: Rüstü Nuran (TUR), Gillian Lesli Ann Martindale (BAR), Shoko Suguro (JPN)

22 July 2011
11:15

Report

China	64–70	Italy
Scoring by quarter: 9–14, 21–18, 18–16, 16–22
Pts: Sun Mengran 18; Rebs: Sun Mengran 9 Asts: Yang Xi 4		Pts: Carangelo 19; Rebs: Masoni 6 Asts: Maffenini, Cigliani 2

Arena Puerto Montt, Puerto Montt
Referees: Juan Carlos Garcia Gonzalez (ESP), Elena Chernova (RUS), Jose Quinones Gonzales (PUR)

22 July 2011
18:00

Report

Egypt	54–99	Canada
Scoring by quarter: 5–28, 14–25, 19–22, 16–24
Pts: Amer 14; Rebs: Massoud 7 Asts: four players 1		Pts: Fields 19; Rebs: Young 5 Asts: Lee, Lukan 3

Arena Puerto Montt, Puerto Montt
Referees: Atanu Banerjee (IND), Patricio Enrique Menares Vasquez (CHI), Ndeye Aissatou Diagne (SEN)

23 July 2011
18:00

Report

Italy	51–75	Canada
Scoring by quarter: 10–19, 15–18, 12–12, 14–26
Pts: Dotto 9 Rebs: Dotto, Carangelo 4 Asts: Dotto, Carangelo 3		Pts: Fields 19; Rebs: Agunbiade 9 Asts: Williams 5

Gimnasio Municipal Puerto Varas, Puerto Varas
Referees: Srdan Dozai (CRO), Matthew John Beattie (AUS), Rüstü Nuran (TUR)

23 July 2011
20:15

Report

China	93–67	Egypt
Scoring by quarter: 28–14, 20–7, 23–24, 22–22
Pts: Yang Xi 19; Rebs: Yang Xi 8 Asts: Yang Xi 4		Pts: Elshaarawy 14; Rebs: Elshaarawy 9 Asts: Massoud 3

Gimnasio Municipal Puerto Varas, Puerto Varas
Referees: Meadow Overstreet (USA), Grzegorz Ziemblicki (POL), Yuliet Mendez Alvarez (CUB)

=== Group B ===
Team	Pld	W	L	PF	PA	PD	Pts	Tiebreaker
United States	3	3	0	244	165	+79	6	
Japan	3	2	1	243	220	+23	5	
Russia	3	1	2	187	217	−30	4	
Argentina	3	0	3	171	243	−72	3	

21 July 2011
13:30

Report

United States	85–63	Japan
Scoring by quarter: 25–17, 23–14, 16–20, 21–12
Pts: Hartley 18; Rebs: Stewart 13; Asts: Massengale 5		Pts: Motokawa 20; Rebs: three players 6 Asts: Takada 3

Arena Puerto Montt, Puerto Montt
Referees: Roberto Chiari (ITA), Atanu Banerjee (IND), Ndeye Aissatou Diagne (SEN)

21 July 2011
16:30

Report

Argentina	51–70	Russia
Scoring by quarter: 7–14, 10–23, 23–9, 11–24
Pts: Gretter 17; Rebs: Cabrera 6 Asts: Gretter 3		Pts: Tikhonenko 18; Rebs: Tikhonenko 10; Asts: Stolyar 4

Arena Puerto Montt, Puerto Montt
Referees: Juan Carlos Garcia Gonzalez (ESP), Yuliet Mendez Alvarez (CUB), Zhu Duan (CHN)

22 July 2011
13:30

Report

Russia	53–76	United States
Scoring by quarter: 7–18, 12–22, 13–25, 21–11
Pts: Andreeva 15; Rebs: Gumennaya 7 Asts: three players 2		Pts: DeShields 16; Rebs: Williams 10; Asts: four players 2

Arena Puerto Montt, Puerto Montt
Referees: Srdan Dozai (CRO), Matthew John Beattie (AUS), Carole Delauné (FRA)

22 July 2011
16:30

Report

Japan	90–71	Argentina
Scoring by quarter: 23–23, 20–3, 30–23, 17–22
Pts: Watanabe 33; Rebs: Watanabe 11; Asts: Machida 6		Pts: Spiatta 12; Rebs: Cabrera 11; Asts: Gretter 4

Arena Puerto Montt, Puerto Montt
Referees: Tomas Jasevicius (LTU), Jonathan Ernest Hunt (CAN), Rüstü Nuran (TUR)

23 July 2011
11:15

Report

Argentina	49–83	United States
Scoring by quarter: 11–26, 11–20, 11–21, 16–16
Pts: Diaz 14; Rebs: Cabrera 11; Asts: Gretter 6		Pts: Stewart 12; Rebs: Burdick 10; Asts: Hartley 4

Arena Puerto Montt, Puerto Montt
Referees: Juan Carlos Garcia Gonzalez (ESP), Kim Bohui (KOR), Heba El Hadidy (EGY)

23 July 2011
18:45

Report

Japan	90–64	Russia
Scoring by quarter: 24–19, 16–16, 29–23, 21–6
Pts: Katsura 22; Rebs: Motokawa 9 Asts: Machida 5		Pts: Tikhonenko 15; Rebs: Tikhonenko 8 Asts: Maksimova 3

Arena Puerto Montt, Puerto Montt
Referees: Jose Quinones Gonazles (PUR), Patricio Enrique Menares Vasquez (CHI), Gillian Lesli Ann Martindale (BAR)

=== Group C ===
Nigeria withdrew from the tournament, the other teams of the group were given a 20–0 win.

Team	Pld	W	L	PF	PA	PD	Pts	Tiebreaker
Australia	3	3	0	164	91	+73	6	
France	3	2	1	124	103	+21	5	
Chile	3	1	2	102	136	−34	4	
Nigeria	3	0	3	0	60	−60	0	

21 July 2011
09:00

Australia	20–0	Nigeria

Gimnasio Municipal Puerto Varas, Puerto Varas

21 July 2011
18:45

Report

France	59–36	Chile
Scoring by quarter: 22–4, 8–10, 16–8, 13–14
Pts: Ayayi 15; Rebs: Barba 8 Asts: Bouzenna 3		Pts: Cousiño 13; Rebs: Tapia 7 Asts: Mansilla, Tapia 2

Arena Puerto Montt, Puerto Montt
Referees: Elena Chernova (RUS), Jonathan Ernest Hunt (CAN), Meadow Overstreet (USA)

22 July 2011
09:00

Nigeria	0–20	France

Gimnasio Municipal Puerto Varas, Puerto Varas

22 July 2011
18:45

Report

Chile	46–77	Australia
Scoring by quarter: 14–23, 8–12, 12–21, 12–21
Pts: Serrano 13; Rebs: Rojas 6 Asts: Mansilla 3		Pts: Roberts 20; Rebs: Tippett, Roberts 10; Asts: Rebecca Cole 4

Arena Puerto Montt, Puerto Montt
Referees: Grzegorz Ziemlicki (POL), Shoko Suguro (JPN), Heba El Hadidy (EGY)

23 July 2011
09:00

Chile	20–0	Nigeria

Arena Puerto Montt, Puerto Montt

23 July 2011
13:30

Report

Australia	67–45	France
Scoring by quarter: 17–10, 20–11, 19–15, 11–9
Pts: Cole 18; Rebs: Allen 10; Asts: Cole 9		Pts: Ayayi 13; Rebs: Bouzenna, Grossemy 5 Asts: Bouzenna 4

Arena Puerto Montt, Puerto Montt
Referees: Roberto Chiari (ITA), Tomas Jasevicius (LTU), Zhu Duan (CHN)

=== Group D ===
Team	Pld	W	L	PF	PA	PD	Pts	Tiebreaker
Brazil	3	3	0	226	164	+62	6	
Spain	3	2	1	216	176	+40	5	
Chinese Taipei	3	1	2	180	238	−58	4	
Slovenia	3	0	3	181	225	−44	3	

21 July 2011
18:00

Report

Chinese Taipei	83–73	Slovenia
Scoring by quarter: 20–17, 18–12, 25–22, 20–22
Pts: Lin Yu-Ting 17; Rebs: Cheng I-Hsiu 6 Asts: five players 1		Pts: Gortnar 23; Rebs: Gortnar 14; Asts: Baric 3

Gimnasio Municipal Puerto Varas, Puerto Varas
Referees: Grzegorz Ziemblicki (POL), Patricio Enrique Menares Vasquez (CHI), Heba El Hadidy (EGY)

21 July 2011
21:00

Report

Brazil	71–64	Spain
Scoring by quarter: 15–18, 20–15, 23–15, 13–16
Pts: Dantas 19; Rebs: Dantas 13; Asts: Martins 3		Pts: Casas 16; Rebs: Gil 9 Asts: Gil 2

Arena Puerto Montt, Puerto Montt
Referees: Srdan Dozai (CRO), Jose Quinones Gonzales (PUR), Matthew John Beattie (AUS)

22 July 2011
20:15

Report

Spain	77–47	Chinese Taipei
Scoring by quarter: 14–10, 12–13, 30–11, 21–13
Pts: Casas 18; Rebs: Ndour 14; Asts: Ortiz 4		Pts: Chang Chi-fang 12; Rebs: Wang Wei-lin 4 Asts: Chang Chi-fang 2

Gimnasio Municipal Puerto Varas, Puerto Varas
Referees: Fabricio Leonardo Vito (ARG), Kim Bohui (KOR), Gillian Lesli Ann Martindale (BAR)

22 July 2011
21:00

Report

Slovenia	50–67	Brazil
Scoring by quarter: 17–19, 6–13, 12–22, 15–13
Pts: Gortnar 17; Rebs: Jakovina 7 Asts: Baric, Rupnik 3		Pts: Dantas 21; Rebs: Gonçalves 11; Asts: Matins, Carcavalli 3

Arena Puerto Montt, Puerto Montt
Referees: Roberto Chiari (ITA), Zhu Duan (CHN), Meadow Overstreet (USA)

23 July 2011
16:30

Report

Slovenia	58–75	Spain
Scoring by quarter: 19–22, 12–16, 17–21, 10–16
Pts: Gortnar 21; Rebs: Gortnar 9 Asts: Rupnik 2		Pts: Casas 20; Rebs: Ortiz, Ndour 8 Asts: Zanoguera 4

Arena Puerto Montt, Puerto Montt
Referees: Jonathan Ernest Hunt (CAN), Shoko Suguro (JPN), Atanu Banerjee (IND)

23 July 2011
21:00

Report

Brazil	88–50	Chinese Taipei
Scoring by quarter: 18–9, 27–6, 17–19, 26–16
Pts: Dantas 15; Rebs: Dantas, Silva 9 Asts: Ramona 3		Pts: Yu-Chun Wei 12; Rebs: three players 4 Asts: Ching-Ning Lee, Cheng I-hsiu 2

Arena Puerto Montt, Puerto Montt
Referees: Elena Chernova (RUS), Carole Delauné (FRA), Ndeye Aissatou Diagne (SEN)

== Eighth-final round ==
=== Group E ===
Team	Pld	W	L	PF	PA	PD	Pts	Tiebreaker
Canada	6	6	0	448	316	+132	12	
United States	6	5	1	470	366	+104	11	
Japan	6	3	3	459	444	+15	9	1–0
Russia	6	3	3	364	391	−27	9	0–1
Italy	6	2	4	379	448	−69	8	1–0
China	6	2	4	423	417	+6	8	0–1

25 July 2011
11:15

Report

Japan	97–69	Italy
Scoring by quarter: 33–22, 18–18, 24–17, 22–12
Pts: Takada 31; Rebs: Machida 9 Asts: Machida 6		Pts: Maffenini 17; Rebs: Formica 8 Asts: Dotto, Zanin 2

Arena Puerto Montt, Puerto Montt
Referees: Fabricio Leonardo Vito (ARG), Carole Delaunẻ (FRA), Bohui Kim (KOR)

25 July 2011
13:30

Report

Russia	50–66	Canada
Scoring by quarter: 8–18, 6–26, 30–14, 6–8
Pts: Polyanova 11; Rebs: Efimova 7 Asts: Kubynina 3		Pts: Fields 22; Rebs: Plouffe 10; Asts: four players 2

Arena Puerto Montt, Puerto Montt
Referees: Juan Carlos Garcia Gonzalez (ESP), Grzegorz Ziemblicki (POL), Heba El Hadidy (EGY)

25 July 2011
16:30

Report

United States	80–77	China
Scoring by quarter: 19–17, 15–15, 24–14, 22–31
Pts: Lewis 19; Rebs: Williams 9 Asts: Hartley 5		Pts: Zuo Jiayi 23; Rebs: Liang Jiamei 7 Asts: Zuo Jiayi 4

Arena Puerto Montt, Puerto Montt
Referees: Patricio Enrique Menares Vasquez (CHI), Matthew John Beattie (AUS), Ndeye Aissatou Diagne (SEN)

26 July 2011
11:15

Report

China	53–65	Russia
Scoring by quarter: 4–10, 21–20, 19–17, 9–18
Pts: Yu Dong 13; Rebs: Jin Weina 7 Asts: Yang Xi 3		Pts: Tikhonenko 20; Rebs: Tikhonenko 8 Asts: Stolyar 2

Arena Puerto Montt, Puerto Montt
Referees: Meadow Overstreet (USA), Rüstü Nuran (TUR), Fabricio Leonardo Vito (ARG)

26 July 2011
13:30

Report

Canada	68–60	Japan
Scoring by quarter: 19–17, 22–12, 14–23, 13–8
Pts: Agunbiade 21; Rebs: Agunbiade 10; Asts: Lukan, M. Plouffe 2		Pts: Motokawa 20; Rebs: Uchino, Machida 8 Asts: Machida 11

Arena Puerto Montt, Puerto Montt
Referees: Juan Carlos Garcia Gonzalez (ESP), Tomas Jasevicius (LTU), Yuliet Mendez Alvarez (CUB)

26 July 2011
16:30

Report

Italy	60–94	United States
Scoring by quarter: 13–31, 15–20, 13–22, 19–21
Pts: Cigliani 11; Rebs: Cigliani 4 Asts: Dotto 3		Pts: Burdick 17; Rebs: Burdick 9 Asts: Massengale 9

Arena Puerto Montt, Puerto Montt
Referees: Patricio Enrique Menares Vasquez (CHI), Gillian Lesli Ann Martindale (BAR), Heba El Hadidy (EGY)

27 July 2011
9:00

Report

Japan	59–87	China
Scoring by quarter: 16–24, 13–17, 11–25, 19–21
Pts: Takada 11; Rebs: Takada 6 Asts: Machida 4		Pts: Ma Xueya 24; Rebs: Ma Xueya 19; Asts: Zuo Jiayi 5

Arena Puerto Montt, Puerto Montt
Referees: Juan Carlos Garcia Gonzalez (ESP), Jonathan Ernest Hunt (CAN), Heba El Hadidy (EGY)

27 July 2011
11:15

Report

Russia	62–55	Italy
Scoring by quarter: 13–16, 5–16, 27–10, 17–13
Pts: Stolyar 21; Rebs: Tikhonenko 22; Asts: Tikhonenko, Poluyanova 3		Pts: Maffenini 20; Rebs: Diene 13; Asts: Dotto, Cigliani 2

Arena Puerto Montt, Puerto Montt
Referees: Grzegorz Ziemblicki (POL), Jose Quinones Gonzales (PUR), Atanu Banerjee (IND)

27 July 2011
13:30

Report

United States	52–64	Canada
Scoring by quarter: 10–20, 13–9, 16–12, 13–23
Pts: Massengale 17; Rebs: Massengale, Lewis 6 Asts: Hartley, Massengale 2		Pts: Plouffe 24; Rebs: Agunbiade 9 Asts: Plouffe 3

Arena Puerto Montt, Puerto Montt
Referees: Rüstü Nuran (TUR), Carole Delauné (FRA), Kim Bohui (KOR)

=== Group F ===
Team	Pld	W	L	PF	PA	PD	Pts	Tiebreaker
Brazil	6	5	1	435	331	+104	11	1–1; +16
Australia	6	5	1	365	273	+93	11	1–1; −6
France	6	5	1	322	270	+52	11	1–1; −10
Spain	6	3	3	415	346	+69	9	
Chinese Taipei	6	2	4	349	442	−93	8	
Chile	6	1	5	244	364	−120	7	

25 July 2011
18:45

Report

Brazil	79–53	Chile
Scoring by quarter: 19–9, 25–15, 19–13, 16–16
Pts: Dantas 22; Rebs: Dantas 18; Asts: Ramona 5		Pts: Rojas 13; Rebs: Rojas 6 Asts: Mansilla 3

Arena Puerto Montt, Puerto Montt
Referees: Tomas Jasevičius (LTU), Gillian Lesli Ann Martindale (BAR), Atanu Banerjee (IND)

25 July 2011
20:15

Report

Spain	55–57	France
Scoring by quarter: 16–14, 8–12, 16–15, 15–16
Pts: Ortiz 21; Rebs: Ortiz 7 Asts: Díaz 3		Pts: Konteh 15; Rebs: Djaldi-Tabdi 10; Asts: Degorces 2

Gimnasio Municipal Puerto Varas, Puerto Varas
Referees: Rüstü Nuran (TUR), Jose Quinones Gonzalez (PUR), Meadow Overstreet (USA)

25 July 2011
21:00

Report

Chinese Taipei	46–89	Australia
Scoring by quarter: 9–20, 13–23, 11–23, 13–23
Pts: Wei Yu-Chun 15; Rebs: Chang Chi-Fang 7 Asts: Cheng I-Hsiu, Lin Yu-Ting 2		Pts: Roberts 18; Rebs: Clydesdale 11; Asts: Cole 7

Arena Puerto Montt, Puerto Montt
Referees: Jonathan Ernest Hunt (CAN), Shoko Suguro (JPN), Yuliet Mendez Alvarez (CUB)

26 July 2011
18:45

Report

Chile	41–66	Chinese Taipei
Scoring by quarter: 8–18, 7–21, 17–2, 9–15
Pts: Rojas 9 Rebs: Garcia 5 Asts: five players 1		Pts: Jung-Hsing Liu 17; Rebs: Lin Yu-ting 10; Asts: Cheng I-hsiu Cheng, Hsiang-Ting Huang 3

Arena Puerto Montt, Puerto Montt
Referees: Srdan Dozai (CRO), Kim Bohui (KOR), Matthew John Beattie (AUS)

26 July 2011
20:15

Report

France	67–55	Brazil
Scoring by quarter: 18–13, 17–12, 16–22, 16–8
Pts: Ayayi 15; Rebs: Djaldi-Tabdi 10; Asts: Degorces, Konteh 5		Pts: Dantas 25; Rebs: Dantas 10; Asts: Martins, Silva 2

Gimnasio Municipal Puerto Varas, Puerto Varas
Referees: Jonathan Ernest Hunt (CAN), Shoko Suguro (JPN), Grzegorz Ziemblicki (POL)

26 July 2011
21:00

Report

Australia	65–61	Spain
Scoring by quarter: 14–17, 22–12, 12–21, 17–11
Pts: Tippett 15; Rebs: Tippett 10; Asts: Cole 6		Pts: Ndour 17; Rebs: Ortiz 3 Asts: Ndour 13

Arena Puerto Montt, Puerto Montt
Referees: Roberto Chiari (ITA), Elena Chernova (RUS), Duan Zhu (CHN)

27 July 2011
16:30

Report

Chinese Taipei	57–74	France
Scoring by quarter: 16–19, 9–18, 16–19, 16–18
Pts: Wang Wei-lin 11; Rebs: Jung-Hsing Liu, Hsiang-Ting Huang 5 Asts: Jung-Hsing Liu, Wang Wei-lin 2		Pts: Akmouche 16; Rebs: Joseph 9 Asts: three players 2

Arena Puerto Montt, Puerto Montt
Referees: Elena Chernova (RUS), Fabricio Leonardo Vito(ARG), Ndeye Aissatou Diagne (SEN)

27 July 2011
18:45

Report

Spain	83–48	Chile
Scoring by quarter: 20–11, 19–13, 21–6, 23–18
Pts: Ndour 15; Rebs: Ndour 10; Asts: Ortiz, España 4		Pts: Mansilla 14; Rebs: Mansilla, Tapia 6 Asts: Fuentes 3

Arena Puerto Montt, Puerto Montt
Referees: Roberto Chiari (ITA), Shoko Suguro (JPN), Yuliet Mednez Alvarez (CUB)

27 July 2011
21:00

Report

Brazil	75–47	Australia
Scoring by quarter: 8–10, 22–19, 27–10, 18–8
Pts: Dantas 24; Rebs: Dantas 16; Asts: Dantas 3		Pts: Allen 14; Rebs: Roberts 12; Asts: Rebecca Cole 8

Arena Puerto Montt, Puerto Montt
Referees: Srdan Dozai (CRO), Tomas Jasevicius (LTU), Meadow Overstreet (USA)

== Knockout stage ==
=== Bracket ===
Quarter-finals
July 29
Canada	55
Spain	69
July 29
Japan	83
Australia	92
July 29
Russia	71
Brazil	73
July 29
United States	70
France	64

Semi-finals
July 30
Spain	55
Australia	49
July 30
Brazil	66
United States	82

Final
July 31
Spain	46
United States	69
Third place
July 31
Australia	67
Brazil	70

5th place bracket

Semi-finals
July 30
Canada	77
Japan	71
July 30
France	82
Russia	50

Fifth place
July 31
Canada	70
France	52
Seventh place
July 31
Japan	71
Russia	66

9th place bracket

Semi-finals
July 29
Italy	67
Chile	48
July 29
China	88
Chinese Taipei	50

Ninth place
July 30
Italy	62
China	66
Eleventh place
July 30
Chile	49
Chinese Taipei	86

13th place bracket

Semi-finals
July 25
Egypt	73
Argentina	94
July 25
Nigeria	0
Slovenia	20

Thirteenth place
July 26
Argentina	89
Slovenia	69
Fifteenth place
July 26
Egypt	20
Nigeria	0

=== Quarterfinals ===
29 July 2011
13:30

Report

Canada	55–69	Spain
Scoring by quarter: 10–17, 16–18, 13–15, 16–19
Pts: Fields 14; Rebs: Plouffe 7 Asts: Lee, Plouffe 2		Pts: Ndour 19; Rebs: Ndour 8 Asts: three players 3

Arena Puerto Montt, Puerto Montt
Referees: Grzegorz Ziemblicki (POL), Elena Chernova (RUS), Zhu Duan (CHN)

29 July 2011
16:30

Report

Japan	83–92	Australia
Scoring by quarter: 15–21, 26–19, 26–32, 16–20
Pts: Takada 23; Rebs: Machida 11; Asts: Motokawa 5		Pts: Roberts 41; Rebs: Roberts 17; Asts: Cole 6

Arena Puerto Montt, Puerto Montt
Referees: Jose Quinones Gonzales (PUR), Carole Delauné (FRA), Yuliet Mendez Alvarez (CUB)

29 July 2011
18:45

Report

United States	70–64	France
Scoring by quarter: 11–23, 14–7, 22–19, 23–15
Pts: Stewart 21; Rebs: Stewart 13; Asts: Hartley 5		Pts: Ayayi 19; Rebs: Ayayi 8 Asts: Degorces 7

Arena Puerto Montt, Puerto Montt
Referees: Roberto Chiari (ITA), Fabricio Leonardo Vito (ARG), Shoko Suguro (JPN)

29 July 2011
21:00

Report

Russia	71–73	Brazil
Scoring by quarter: 13–22, 19–19, 20–13, 19–19
Pts: Stolyar 21; Rebs: Poluyanova 17; Asts: Efimova 5		Pts: Dantas 23; Rebs: Dantas 17; Asts: Carcavalli 2

Arena Puerto Montt, Puerto Montt
Referees: Jonathan Ernest Hunt (CAN), Rüstü Nuran (TUR), Kim Bohui (KOR)

=== Classification 13–16 ===
25 July 2011
09:00

Nigeria	0–20	Slovenia

Gimnasio Municipal Puerto Varas, Puerto Varas

25 July 2011
18:00

Report

Egypt	73–94	Argentina
Scoring by quarter: 8–18, 16–26, 17–24, 32–26
Pts: Amer 29; Rebs: Amer 14; Asts: Moussa 4		Pts: Diaz 20; Rebs: Fiorotto 11; Asts: Gretter 10

Gimnasio Municipal Puerto Varas, Puerto Varas
Referees: Srdan Dozai (CRO), Elena Chernova (RUS), Zhu Duan (CHN)

=== Classification 9–12 ===
29 July 2011
09:00

Report

Italy	67–48	Chile
Scoring by quarter: 24–11, 10–17, 24–8, 9–12
Pts: Maffenini 13; Rebs: Carangelo, Cigliani 8 Asts: Carangelo, Maffenini 3		Pts: Serrano 14; Rebs: Tapia 7 Asts: three players 2

Arena Puerto Montt, Puerto Montt
Referees: Tomas Jasevicius (LTU), Heba El Hadidy (EGY), Ndeye Aissatou Diagne (SEN)

29 July 2011
11:15

Report

China	88–50	Chinese Taipei
Scoring by quarter: 19–17, 20–6, 23–11, 26–16
Pts: Yang Liwei 14; Rebs: Liang Jiamei 9 Asts: four players 3		Pts: Lin Yu-chih 12; Rebs: Chang Chi-fang 11; Asts: Chang Chi-fang 5

Arena Puerto Montt, Puerto Montt
Referees: Srdan Dozai (CRO), Patricio Enrique Menares Vasquez (CHI), Gillian Lesli Ann Martindale (BAR)

=== Classification 5–8 ===
30 July 2011
13:30

Report

Canada	77–71	Japan
Scoring by quarter: 27–17, 20–11, 14–11, 16–32
Pts: Plouffe 19; Rebs: Williams, Plouffe 8 Asts: Williams 3		Pts: Takada 29; Rebs: Machida 8 Asts: Machida 11

Arena Puerto Montt, Puerto Montt
Referees: Rüstü Nuran (TUR), Zhu Duan (CHN), Gillian Lesli Ann Martindale (BAR)

30 July 2011
16:30

Report

France	82–50	Russia
Scoring by quarter: 12–15, 20–13, 22–14, 28–8
Pts: Fouasseau 17; Rebs: Djaldi-Tabdi 11; Asts: Degorces 4		Pts: Tikhonenko, Poluyanova 8 Rebs: Tikhonenko 7 Asts: Kubynina 4

Arena Puerto Montt, Puerto Montt
Referees: Grzegorz Ziemblicki (POL), Meadow Overstreet (USA), Atanu Banerjee (IND)

=== Semifinals ===
30 July 2011
18:45

Report

Spain	55–49	Australia
Scoring by quarter: 16–15, 8–5, 13–15, 18–14
Pts: Ndour 13; Rebs: Ndour 13; Asts: Ortiz 5		Pts: Cole 14; Rebs: Allen 7 Asts: Clydesdale 2

Arena Puerto Montt, Puerto Montt
Referees: Roberto Chiari (ITA), Jonathan Ernest Hunt (CAN), Shoko Suguro (JPN)

30 July 2011
21:00

Report

United States	82–66	Brazil
Scoring by quarter: 20–15, 29–21, 17–16, 16–14
Pts: Hartley 20; Rebs: Burdick, Stewart 9 Asts: Massengale 9		Pts: Dantas 13; Rebs: Dantas 8 Asts: Carcavalli 3

Arena Puerto Montt, Puerto Montt
Referees: Srdan Dozai (CRO), Tomas Jasevicius (LTU), Elena Chernova (RUS)

=== Fifteenth place game ===
26 July 2011
09:00

Egypt	20–0	Nigeria

Gimnasio Municipal Puerto Varas, Puerto Varas

=== Thirteenth place game ===
26 July 2011
18:00

Report

Argentina	89–69	Slovenia
Scoring by quarter: 18–20, 22–16, 23–27, 26–6
Pts: Gretter 25; Rebs: Cabrera 10; Asts: Gretter 5		Pts: Baric 27; Rebs: Gortnar 7 Asts: Baric

Gimnasio Municipal Puerto Varas, Puerto Varas
Referees: Carole Delauné (FRA), Jose Quinones Gonzales (PUR), Atanu Banerjee (IND)

=== Eleventh place game ===
30 July 2011
09:00

Report

Chile	49–86	Chinese Taipei
Scoring by quarter: 9–25, 13–16, 10–20, 17–25
Pts: Serrano 11; Rebs: Videla 5 Asts: Mansilla 4		Pts: Lin Yu-ting 15; Rebs: Cheng I-hsiu 12; Asts: Chang Chi-fang 6

Arena Puerto Montt, Puerto Montt
Referees: Juan Carlos Garcia Gonzalez (ESP), Yuliet Mendez Alvarez (CUB), Ndeye Aissatou Diagne (SEN)

=== Ninth place game ===
30 July 2011
11:15

Report

Italy	62–66	China
Scoring by quarter: 11–23, 9–16, 15–11, 27–16
Pts: Formica 23; Rebs: Diene 7 Asts: Carangelo 3		Pts: Ma Xueya 15; Rebs: Ma Xueya 10; Asts: Jin Weina 3

Arena Puerto Montt, Puerto Montt
Referees: Fabricio Leonardo Vito (ARG), Patricio Enrique Menares Vasquez (CHI), Kim Bohui (KOR)

=== Seventh place game ===
31 July 2011
11:15

Report

Japan	71–66	Russia
Scoring by quarter: 18–15, 21–20, 14–22, 18–9
Pts: Takada 19; Rebs: Sezaki, Machida 9 Asts: Machida 6		Pts: Tikhonenko 21; Rebs: Tikhonenko 17; Asts: Fedorenkova 6

Arena Puerto Montt, Puerto Montt
Referees: Jose Quinones Gonzales (PUR), Fabricio Leonardo Vito (ARG), Heba El Hadidy (EGY)

=== Fifth place game ===
31 July 2011
13:30

Report

Canada	70–52	France
Scoring by quarter: 27–18, 9–14, 14–9, 20–11
Pts: Fields 18; Rebs: Agunbiad, Plouffe 7 Asts: Plouffe 4		Pts: Konteh 14; Rebs: Djaldi-Tabdi 10; Asts: Degorces 4

Arena Puerto Montt, Puerto Montt
Referees: Srdan Dozai (CRO), Patricio Enrique Menares Vasquez (CHI), Shoko Suguro (JPN)

=== Third place game ===
31 July 2011
16:30

Report

Australia	67–70	Brazil
Scoring by quarter: 16–20, 19–13, 10–18, 22–19
Pts: Allen, Roberts 16; Rebs: Allen 12; Asts: Cole 7		Pts: Dantas 26; Rebs: Dantas 13; Asts: Martins 4

Arena Puerto Montt, Puerto Montt
Referees: Juan Carlos Garcia Gonzalez (ESP), Grzegorz Ziemblicki (POL), Meadow Overstreet (USA)

=== Final ===
31 July 2011
18:45

Report

Spain	46–69	United States
Scoring by quarter: 15–25, 7–12, 14–19, 10–13
Pts: Ndour 10; Rebs: Ndour 6 Asts: Zanoguera 3		Pts: three players 15; Rebs: Adams, Lewis 8 Asts: Massengale 7

Arena Puerto Montt, Puerto Montt
Referees: Roberto Chiari (ITA), Carole Delauné (FRA), Zhu Duan (CHN)

== Statistical leaders ==
Points

Name	PPG
(Brazil) Damiris Dantas	20.9
(Egypt) Hagar Amer	19.3
(Slovenia) Tjasa Gortnar	18.8
(Japan) Shiori Takada	16.9
(Canada) Nirra Fields	15.9

Rebounds

Name	RPG
(Brazil) Damiris Dantas	12.6
(Russia) Ksenia Tikhonenko	10.3
(Argentina) Diana Cabrera	9.2
(Spain) Astou Ndour	9.1
(Slovenia) Tjasa Gortnar	9.0

Assists

Name	APG
(Japan) Rui Machida	6.2
(Australia) Rebecca Cole	6.0
(Argentina) Melisa Gretter	5.6
(United States) Ariel Massengale	4.3
(Slovenia) Nika Baric	3.3

Blocks

Name	BPG
(Egypt) Hala Elshaarawy	2.0
(United States) Breanna Stewart	1.7
(Spain) Astou Ndour	1.6
(Russia) Ksenia Tikhonenko	1.1
(France) Clarince Djaldi-Tabdi	1.1

Steals

Name	SPG
(Italy) Debora Carangelo	2.6
(Egypt) Sara Massoud	2.5
(Brazil) Isabela Ramona	2.4
(Australia) Rebecca Allen	2.4
(Egypt) Reem Osama	2.3

== Final standings ==
Rank	Team
1st place, gold medalist(s)	United States
2nd place, silver medalist(s)	Spain
3rd place, bronze medalist(s)	Brazil
4th	Australia
5th	Canada
6th	France
7th	Japan
8th	Russia
9th	China
10th	Italy
11th	Chinese Taipei
12th	Chile
13th	Argentina
14th	Slovenia
15th	Egypt
16th	Nigeria

== Awards ==
2011 Under-19 World Championship for Women winner

United States
Fifth title

Most Valuable Player
(Brazil) Damiris Dantas

All-Tournament Team

- (Brazil) Damiris Dantas
- (Japan) Rui Machida
- (United States) Ariel Massengale
- (United States) Breanna Stewart
- (Spain) Astou Ndour
