= 2010 FIBA Under-17 World Championship for Women =

- Official logo of the FIBA Women's Under-17 World Championship 2010

Tournament details
- Host country: France
- Cities: Toulouse, Rodez
- Dates: 16–25 July
- Teams: 12 (from 5 confederations)
- Venues: 2 (in 2 host cities)

Final positions
- Champions: United States (1st title)

Tournament statistics
- MVP: (China) Li Meng
- Top scorer: (Canada) Fields (22.4)
- Top rebounds: (Argentina) Cabrera (10.6)
- Top assists: (United States) Massengale (5.4)
- PPG (Team): United States (94.8)
- RPG (Team): United States (53.0)
- APG (Team): United States (18.9)

Official website
- web.archive.org

The 2010 FIBA Under-17 World Championship for Women (French: Championnat du monde féminin de basket-ball des moins de 17 ans 2010) was an international basketball competition, held in Toulouse and Rodez, France from July 16–25, 2010. It was the first edition of the Women's Under-17 World Championships.

== Qualification ==
- 2009 FIBA Africa Under-16 Championship for Women
  1. Mali
- 2009 FIBA Asia Under-16 Championship for Women
  1. China
  2. Japan
- 2009 FIBA Americas Under-16 Championship for Women
  1. United States
  2. Canada
  3. Argentina
- 2009 FIBA Europe Under-16 Championship for Women
  1. Belgium
  2. Russia
  3. Spain
  4. Turkey
- 2009 FIBA Oceania Under-16 Championship for Women
  1. Australia
- Host country
  1. France

== Groups ==
Group A	Group B
Canada; France; Japan; Russia; Turkey; United States	Argentina; Australia; Belgium; China; Mali; Spain

== Preliminary round ==
Times given below are in CEST (UTC+2).

=== Group A ===
Team	Pld	W	L	PF	PA	PD	Pts	Tiebreaker
United States	5	5	0	483	266	+217	10	
France	5	3	2	303	304	−1	8	
Russia	5	2	3	311	331	−20	7	
Japan	5	2	3	373	436	−63	7	
Turkey	5	2	3	306	348	−42	7	
Canada	5	1	4	340	431	−91	6	

July 16
15:00

Report

Japan	68–93	Russia
Scoring by quarter: 6–24, 30–24, 23–23, 9–22
Pts: Miyazawa 16; Rebs: Chikahira 9 Asts: Fujioka, Miyazawa 3		Pts: Tikhonenko 22; Rebs: Tikhonenko 16; Asts: Kiseleva 3

L´Amphitheatre, Rodez

July 16
17:30

Report

Turkey	73–82	Canada
Scoring by quarter: 14–18, 10–19, 24–23, 25–22
Pts: Cora 16; Rebs: Kavurmacıoğlu 10; Asts: Cakir, Aydin, Cora 2		Pts: Fields 25; Rebs: Dheensaw 10; Asts: Dheensaw 4

L´Amphitheatre, Rodez

July 16
20:30

Report

United States	70–45	France
Scoring by quarter: 22–12, 9–16, 25–8, 14–9
Pts: Stewart 13; Rebs: Williams 11; Asts: Massengale, Loyd 3		Pts: Galliou 9 Rebs: Galliou 6 Asts: Niamke, Epoupa, Mercier 2

L´Amphitheatre, Rodez

July 17
15:00

Report

Canada	80–87	Japan
Scoring by quarter: 15–17, 23–27, 16–28, 26–15
Pts: Fields 36; Rebs: Fields 9 Asts: Ring, Dheensaw 2		Pts: Nagaoka 34; Rebs: Miyazawa 13; Asts: Fujioka 3

L´Amphitheatre, Rodez

July 17
17:30

Report

United States	82–38	Russia
Scoring by quarter: 15–12, 26–14, 25–7, 16–5
Pts: Williams 20; Rebs: Williams 14; Asts: Massengale 3		Pts: Posylkina 9 Rebs: Davydova 9 Asts: Fedorenkove, Namok, Ryavkina 2

L´Amphitheatre, Rodez

July 17
20:30

Report

France	51–54	Turkey
Scoring by quarter: 13–8, 13–13, 15–17, 10–16
Pts: Mayo, Galliou 8 Rebs: Nayo 6 Asts: Stievenard, Niamke 2		Pts: Kavurmacıoğlu 16; Rebs: Kavurmacıoğlu 7 Asts: Aydin, Duman 2

L´Amphitheatre, Rodez

July 18
15:00

Report

United States	114–57	Canada
Scoring by quarter: 28–20, 25–15, 25–14, 36–8
Pts: Lewis 21; Rebs: Stafford 12; Asts: Massengale 6		Pts: Fields 17; Rebs: Fields, Kiss-Rusk, Dheensaw 5 Asts: Roser 3

L´Amphitheatre, Rodez

July 18
17:30

Report

Russia	53–56	France
Scoring by quarter: 10–13, 14–15, 18–18, 11–10
Pts: Tikhonenko 13; Rebs: Tikhonenko 10; Asts: Tochilova 5		Pts: Diallo 14; Rebs: Epoupa 7 Asts: Epoupa 3

L´Amphitheatre, Rodez

July 18
20:30

Report

Japan	80–60	Turkey
Scoring by quarter: 24–21, 22–15, 19–11, 15–13
Pts: Miyazawa 20; Rebs: Nagaoka 12; Asts: Fujioka 6		Pts: Cakir 16; Rebs: Kavurmacıoğlu 14; Asts: Cora 4

L´Amphitheatre, Rodez

July 20
15:00

Report

Canada	61–76	Russia
Scoring by quarter: 14–19, 14–10, 10–19, 23–28
Pts: Fields 20; Rebs: Kiss-Rusk 8 Asts: Ring 3		Pts: Namok 13; Rebs: Tikhonenko 9 Asts: Tochilova 3

L´Amphitheatre, Rodez

July 20
17:30

Report

Turkey	55–84	United States
Scoring by quarter: 4–21, 17–22, 18–15, 16–26
Pts: Kavurmacıoğlu 13; Rebs: Yalcinkaya 5 Asts: Cora 5		Pts: Loyd, Tuck 11; Rebs: Lewis 6 Asts: Massengale 3

L´Amphitheatre, Rodez

July 20
20:30

Report

France	70–67	Japan
Scoring by quarter: 15–13, 21–13, 22–16, 12–25
Pts: Diallo 14; Rebs: Galliou, Mbuzamba-T. 7 Asts: Mercier 3		Pts: Miyazawa 25; Rebs: Miyazawa 7 Asts: Fujioka 5

L´Amphitheatre, Rodez

July 21
15:00

Report

Russia	51–64	Turkey
Scoring by quarter: 7–16, 13–7, 11–18, 20–23
Pts: Tikhonenko 18; Rebs: Tikhonenko 15; Asts: Zamaraeva 3		Pts: Kavurmacıoğlu 17; Rebs: Cakir 10; Asts: Duman 4

L´Amphitheatre, Rodez

July 21
17:30

Report

United States	133–71	Japan
Scoring by quarter: 35–12, 26–15, 37–23, 35–21
Pts: Stewart 30; Rebs: Williams 8 Asts: Massengale 10		Pts: Izumita 15; Rebs: Miyazawa 5 Asts: Fujioka, Negishi, Miyoshi 5

L´Amphitheatre, Rodez

July 21
20:30

Report

Canada	60–81	France
Scoring by quarter: 22–22, 13–17, 14–18, 11–24
Pts: Fields 30; Rebs: Der 11; Asts: Piackard, Fields 4		Pts: Diallo 24; Rebs: Diallo 9 Asts: Epoupa 5

L´Amphitheatre, Rodez

=== Group B ===
Team	Pld	W	L	PF	PA	PD	Pts	Tiebreaker
Belgium	5	4	1	345	277	+68	9	
China	5	4	1	424	331	+93	9	
Australia	5	3	2	359	312	+47	8	
Spain	5	2	3	349	270	+79	7	
Argentina	5	2	3	279	319	−40	7	
Mali	5	0	5	211	458	−247	5	

July 16
15:00

Report

China	72–54	Argentina
Scoring by quarter: 21–11, 17–10, 21–14, 13–19
Pts: Cui 15; Rebs: Li 10; Asts: Li, Yu 3		Pts: Diaz 14; Rebs: Cabrera 11; Asts: Sancisi 4

Palais des Sports de Toulouse, Toulouse

July 16
17:30

Report

Belgium	80–27	Mali
Scoring by quarter: 16–5, 16–2, 31–7, 17–13
Pts: Meesseman 16; Rebs: Meesseman 9 Asts: Delmulle 6		Pts: Guindo 7 Rebs: Traore, Sanou 11; Asts: Toure, Traore, Sanou 1

Palais des Sports de Toulouse, Toulouse

July 16
20:30

Report

Spain	57–58	Australia
Scoring by quarter: 15–20, 11–8, 16–16, 15–14
Pts: Melich 13; Rebs: Uriszar-A. 7 Asts: Castellano 3		Pts: Tippett, Roberts 13; Rebs: Roberts 9 Asts: Blicavs 5

Palais des Sports de Toulouse, Toulouse

July 17
15:00

Report

Argentina	55–53	Belgium
Scoring by quarter: 18–10, 11–16, 17–15, 9–12
Pts: Diaz 20; Rebs: Gretter, Favre 7 Asts: Gretter 4		Pts: Meesseman 17; Rebs: Mestdagh 14; Asts: Delmulle 3

Palais des Sports de Toulouse, Toulouse

July 17
17:30

Report

Australia	75–92	China
Scoring by quarter: 27–32, 12–15, 24–23, 12–22
Pts: Roberts 14; Rebs: Tippett 14; Asts: Tippett 5		Pts: Li 24; Rebs: Yu 9 Asts: Cui 6

Palais des Sports de Toulouse, Toulouse

July 17
20:30

Report

Mali	42–112	Spain
Scoring by quarter: 11–31, 17–28, 6–30, 8–23
Pts: Toure 17; Rebs: Sanou 12; Asts: Guindo 2		Pts: Coderch 18; Rebs: Uriszar, Florez 6 Asts: Garcias, Coderch, Vilaró, Moros 3

Palais des Sports de Toulouse, Toulouse

July 18
15:00

Report

Australia	77–57	Argentina
Scoring by quarter: 25–8, 16–19, 23–12, 13–18
Pts: Tippett 21; Rebs: Tippett 8 Asts: Nicholson 4		Pts: Vazquez 9 Rebs: Cabrera 5 Asts: Sancisi 4

Palais des Sports de Toulouse, Toulouse

July 18
17:30

Report

Spain	54–55	Belgium
Scoring by quarter: 19–11, 17–15, 11–9, 7–20
Pts: Vilaró 13; Rebs: Moros 8 Asts: Melich 3		Pts: Vanloo 16; Rebs: Meesseman 8 Asts: Devliegher 5

Palais des Sports de Toulouse, Toulouse

July 18
20:30

Report

China	103–54	Mali
Scoring by quarter: 31–13, 26–13, 20–11, 26–17
Pts: Li 18; Rebs: Ma 12; Asts: Li 8		Pts: Sanou 15; Rebs: Traore 7 Asts: Konaté 4

Palais des Sports de Toulouse, Toulouse

July 20
15:00

Report

Belgium	90–80	China
Scoring by quarter: 21–16, 29–20, 23–19, 17–25
Pts: Vanloo 31; Rebs: Meesseman 9 Asts: Vanloo, Deviliegher 6		Pts: Yu 25; Rebs: Li 13; Asts: Li 4

Palais des Sports de Toulouse, Toulouse

July 20
17:30

Report

Mali	39–88	Australia
Scoring by quarter: 7–17, 14–29, 3–24, 15–18
Pts: Maiga 16; Rebs: Sanou 5 Asts: Guindo 3		Pts: Roberts 17; Rebs: Thompson 11; Asts: Talbot, Blicavs 4

Palais des Sports de Toulouse, Toulouse

July 20
20:30

Report

Argentina	38–68	Spain
Scoring by quarter: 3–19, 11–8, 11–24, 13–17
Pts: Acosta 8 Rebs: Cabrera 8 Asts: Gretter 3		Pts: Vilaró 18; Rebs: Melich 8 Asts: Vilaró 5

Palais des Sports de Toulouse, Toulouse

July 21
15:00

Report

Australia	61–67	Belgium
Scoring by quarter: 12–19, 20–12, 16–20, 13–16
Pts: Roberts 23; Rebs: Roberts 14; Asts: Talbot 4		Pts: Delmulle 16; Rebs: Meesseman 8 Asts: Delaere, Devilegher 3

Palais des Sports de Toulouse, Toulouse

July 21
17:30

Report

Mali	49–75	Argentina
Scoring by quarter: 12–17, 10–24, 13–15, 14–19
Pts: Maiga 12; Rebs: Traore 15; Asts: Traore 7		Pts: Diaz 22; Rebs: Cabrera 12; Asts: Cabrera, Gretter 9

Palais des Sports de Toulouse, Toulouse

July 21
20:30

Report

China	77–58	Spain
Scoring by quarter: 23–9, 16–18, 17–17, 21–14
Pts: Yu 20; Rebs: Yu 14; Asts: Cui 7		Pts: Diaz 16; Rebs: Marcelo 10; Asts: Diaz, Balart 3

Palais des Sports de Toulouse, Toulouse

== Knockout round ==
=== Championship ===
Quarter-finals
July 23 – Toulouse
United States	86
Spain	57
July 23 – Toulouse
China	68
Russia	59
July 23 – Toulouse
France	69
Australia	59
July 23 – Toulouse
Belgium	93
Japan	70

Semi-finals
July 24 – Toulouse
United States	97
China	74
July 24 – Toulouse
France	59
Belgium	49

Final
July 25 – Toulouse
United States	92
France	62
Third place
July 25 – Toulouse
China	85
Belgium	73

==== Quarterfinals ====
July 23
12:30

Report

China	68–59	Russia
Scoring by quarter: 14–10, 21–16, 12–14, 21–19
Pts: Yu 19; Rebs: Li 11; Asts: Yang, Li 4		Pts: Kiseleva 15; Rebs: Davydova 7 Asts: six players 1

Palais des Sports de Toulouse, Toulouse

July 23
15:00

Report

United States	86–57	Spain
Scoring by quarter: 27–16, 21–12, 22–14, 16–15
Pts: Lewis 16; Rebs: Burdick, Graves 5 Asts: Massengale 6		Pts: Gonzalez 15; Rebs: Marcelo 8 Asts: Llobet 3

Palais des Sports de Toulouse, Toulouse

July 23
17:30

Report

Belgium	93–70	Japan
Scoring by quarter: 27–11, 25–23, 18–19, 23–17
Pts: Vanloo, Meesseman 23; Rebs: Meesseman 13; Asts: Devliegher 6		Pts: Miyazawa 21; Rebs: Miyazawa 12; Asts: Fujioka, Nagaoka 2

Palais des Sports de Toulouse, Toulouse

July 23
20:30

Report

France	69–59	Australia
Scoring by quarter: 20–19, 12–11, 17–11, 20–18
Pts: Chevaugeon 13; Rebs: Diallo 7 Asts: Moisan 3		Pts: Tippett 17; Rebs: Bunton, Roberts 6 Asts: Clydesdale, Blicavs 3

Palais des Sports de Toulouse, Toulouse

==== Semifinals ====
July 24
17:30

Report

China	74–97	United States
Scoring by quarter: 18–28, 30–26, 18–19, 8–24
Pts: Li 22; Rebs: Yang L. 6 Asts: Yang X. 5		Pts: Massengale 22; Rebs: Stewart 11; Asts: Massengale 6

Palais des Sports de Toulouse, Toulouse

July 24
20:30

Report

Belgium	49–59	France
Scoring by quarter: 10–17, 15–12, 13–17, 11–13
Pts: Meesseman 12; Rebs: Meesseman 9 Asts: Lien Delmulle 3		Pts: Epoupa 18; Rebs: Epoupa 11; Asts: Epoupa 5

Palais des Sports de Toulouse, Toulouse

==== Bronze medal game ====
July 25
14:30

Report

China	85–73	Belgium
Scoring by quarter: 26–25, 15–21, 21–16, 23–11
Pts: Yu 29; Rebs: Yu 13; Asts: Yang L. 5		Pts: Vanloo 23; Rebs: Meesseman 11; Asts: Meesseman 4

Palais des Sports de Toulouse, Toulouse

==== Final ====
July 25
17:30

Report

United States	92–62	France
Scoring by quarter: 26–16, 24–22, 25–16, 17–8
Pts: Massengale 20; Rebs: Stewart 8 Asts: Massengale 6		Pts: Chevaugeon 11; Rebs: Galliou, Cornelie 7 Asts: Cornelie 3

Palais des Sports de Toulouse, Toulouse

=== 5th–8th playoffs ===
Semi-finals
July 24 – Toulouse
Russia	72
Spain	52
July 24 – Toulouse
Japan	95
Australia	92

Fifth place
July 25 – Toulouse
Russia	68
Japan	74
Seventh place
July 25 – Toulouse
Spain	48
Australia	74

==== 5th–8th semifinals ====
July 24
12:30

Report

Russia	72–52	Spain
Scoring by quarter: 13–16, 18–14, 20–10, 21–12
Pts: Tikhonenko 20; Rebs: Tikhonenko, Kiseleva 9 Asts: four players 2		Pts: Vilaró 13; Rebs: Martinez 6 Asts: Balart 3

L´Amphitheatre, Rodez

July 24
15:00

Report

Japan	95–92	Australia
Scoring by quarter: 34–26, 20–33, 26–14, 15–19
Pts: Miyazawa 30; Rebs: Nagaoka 8 Asts: Fujioka 9		Pts: Tippett 34; Rebs: Tippett 16; Asts: Talbot 6

L´Amphitheatre, Rodez

==== 7th place playoff ====
July 25
09:30

Report

Spain	48–74	Australia
Scoring by quarter: 12–8, 12–22, 5–20, 19–24
Pts: Castellano 14; Rebs: Moros 6 Asts: three players 2		Pts: Roberts 25; Rebs: Roberts 14; Asts: Tippett 5

L´Amphitheatre, Rodez

==== 5th place playoff ====
July 25
12:00

Report

Russia	68–74	Japan
Scoring by quarter: 22–12, 19–14, 10–22, 17–26
Pts: Davydova 12; Rebs: Tikhonenko 8 Asts: Tochilova 2		Pts: Nagaoka 28; Rebs: Miyazawa 16; Asts: Fujioka, Miyazawa 2

L´Amphitheatre, Rodez

=== 9th–12th playoffs ===
Semi-finals
July 23 – Rodez
Turkey	88
Mali	56
July 23 – Rodez
Argentina	59
Canada	51

Ninth place
July 24 – Rodez
Turkey	48
Argentina	62
Eleventh place
July 24 – Rodez
Mali	48
Canada	82

==== 9th–12th semifinals ====
July 23
17:30

Report

Turkey	88–56	Mali
Scoring by quarter: 22–12, 16–14, 14–12, 26–18
Pts: Kavurmacıoğlu 19; Rebs: Cakir 8 Asts: Cakir, Cora 5		Pts: Sanou 18; Rebs: Traore, Sanou 10; Asts: Traore 3

L´Amphitheatre, Rodez

July 23
20:30

Report

Argentina	59–51	Canada
Scoring by quarter: 25–14, 11–9, 7–11, 16–17
Pts: Martinez 14; Rebs: Cabrera 15; Asts: Cabrera, Gretter 4		Pts: Fields 11; Rebs: Fields 10; Asts: Dheensaw 3

L´Amphitheatre, Rodez

==== 11th place playoff ====
July 24
12:00

Report

Mali	48–82	Canada
Scoring by quarter: 13–27, 9–18, 3–23, 23–14
Pts: Maiga 17; Rebs: Sanou 8 Asts: three players 1		Pts: Fields 18; Rebs: Dheensaw 9 Asts: Roser 5

L´Amphitheatre, Rodez

==== 9th place playoff ====
July 24
14:00

Report

Turkey	48–62	Argentina
Scoring by quarter: 11–21, 7–11, 15–15, 15–15
Pts: Cora 14; Rebs: Kavurmacıoğlu 9 Asts: Aydin 2		Pts: Diaz 16; Rebs: Cabrera 18; Asts: Gretter 6

L´Amphitheatre, Rodez

== Final standings ==
Rank	Team	Record
Gold medal	United States	8–0
Silver medal	France	5–3
Bronze medal	China	6–2
4th	Belgium	5–3
5th	Japan	4–4
6th	Russia	3–5
7th	Australia	4–4
8th	Spain	2–6
9th	Argentina	4–3
10th	Turkey	3–4
11th	Canada	2–5
12th	Mali	0–7

== Awards ==
2010 Under-17 World Championship for Women winner

United States
First title

Most Valuable Player
(China) Li Meng

All-Tournament Team

== Statistical leaders ==
Points

Name	PPG
(Canada) Nirra Fields	22.4
(Japan) Yuki Miyazawa	21.6
(Japan) Moeko Nagaoka	18.5
(Australia) Gretel Tippett	18.0
(Belgium) Julie Vanloo	16.6

Rebounds

Name	RPG
(Argentina) Diana Maria Cabrera	10.6
(Russia) Ksenia Tikhonenko	9.8
(Belgium) Emma Meesseman	9.6
(Japan) Yuki Miyazawa	9.2
(China) Yu Dong	9.1

Assists

Name	APG
(United States) Ariel Massengale	5.4
(Japan) Manami Fujioka	4.4
(Argentina) Melisa Paola Gretter	4.1
(China) Li Meng	4.0
(Belgium) Sien Devilegher	3.6

Blocks

Name	BPG
(Belgium) Emma Meesseman	2.5
(United States) Breanna Stewart	2.2
(United States) Elizabeth Williams	2.0
(Russia) Ksenia Tikhonenko	1.9
(Japan) Moeko Nagaoka	1.6

Steals

Name	SPG
(Spain) Silvia Marceló Moros	2.8
(Argentina) Diana Maria Cabrera	2.7
(Spain) Inmaculada Zanoguera Garcias	2.6
(Argentina) Melisa Paola Gretter	2.6
(Japan) Manami Fujioka	2.4
