= 2011 FIBA Africa Under-16 Championship for Women =

Women's basketball tournament

2011 FIBA U16 Women's AfroBasket
2nd FIBA Under-16 Women's African Basketball Championship

Tournament details
- Host country: Egypt
- Dates: July 22–30
- Teams: 6
- Venue: 1 (in 1 host city)

Final positions
- Champions: Mali (2nd title)

Tournament statistics
- MVP: (Egypt) Soraya Mohamed
- Top scorer: (Angola) Rosa Gala
- Top rebounds: (Mali) Maïmouna Diallo

Official website
- 2011 FIBA Africa Championship for Women U-16

The 2011 FIBA Africa Under-16 Championship for Women (alternatively the Afrobasket U16) was the 2nd U-16 FIBA Africa championship, played under the auspices of the Fédération Internationale de Basketball, the basketball sport governing body and qualified for the 2012 World Cup. The tournament was held from July 22–30 in Alexandria, Egypt, contested by 6 national teams and won by Mali.

== Teams ==
- Algeria
- Angola
- Egypt
- Mali
- Mozambique
- Tunisia

== Format ==
- The 6 teams played a round robin system for the preliminary round.
- From there on a knockout system was used until the final.

== Preliminary round ==
Times given below are in UTC+2.

Qualified for the semi-finals

Team	W	L	PF	PA	Diff	Pts.
Egypt	5	0	392	204	+188	10
Tunisia	4	1	279	262	+17	9
Mali	3	2	254	229	+25	8
Angola	2	3	291	296	-5	7
Algeria	1	4	211	335	-124	4
Mozambique	0	5	241	342	-101	4

22 July 2011

Egypt	89–56	Angola

Alexandria

23 July 2011

Tunisia	78–52	Algeria

Alexandria

28 July 2011

Mali	65–44	Mozambique

Alexandria

23 July 2011

Mali	55–53	Angola

Alexandria

24 July 2011

Egypt	83–27	Algeria

Alexandria

25 July 2011

Mozambique	55–62	Tunisia

Alexandria

24 July 2011

Mozambique	57–62	Angola

Alexandria

25 July 2011

Algeria	29–61	Mali

Alexandria

28 July 2011

Egypt	77–34	Tunisia

Alexandria

26 July 2011

Angola	50–55	Tunisia

Alexandria

26 July 2011

Algeria	63–43	Mozambique

Alexandria

26 July 2011

Egypt	53–45	Mali

Alexandria

27 July 2011

Mozambique	42–90	Egypt

Alexandria

28 July 2011

Angola	70–40	Algeria

Alexandria

24 July 2011

Tunisia	50–28	Mali

Alexandria

== Knockout stage ==
Semi-finals
29 July
Tunisia	54
Mali	72
29 July
Angola	41
Egypt	72

Final
30 July
Egypt	54
Mali	66
Third place
30 July
Angola	59
Tunisia	55

=== Semifinals ===
29 July 2011

Tunisia	54–72	Mali

Alexandria

29 July 2011

Egypt	72–41	Angola

Alexandria

=== Bronze medal game ===
30 July 2011

Angola	59–55	Tunisia

Alexandria

=== Gold medal game ===
30 July 2011

Egypt	54–66	Mali

Alexandria

== Final standings ==
Rank	Team	Record
Gold medal	Mali	5–2
Silver medal	Egypt	6–1
Bronze medal	Angola	3–4
4	Tunisia	3–3
5	Algeria	1–4
6	Mozambique	0–5

== Awards ==
2011 FIBA Africa Under-16 Championship for Women winner

Mali
Second title

Most Valuable Player
(Egypt) Farida Wael

=== All-Tournament Team ===
- G (Egypt) Farida Wael
- G (Tunisia) Wafa Lobiri
- F (Angola) Rosa Gala
- F (Mali) Maïmouna Diallo
- C (Tunisia) Khouloud Akroute

== See also ==
- 2011 FIBA Africa Championship for Women
