= Hebei Win Power =

- League: Women's Chinese Basketball Association
- Founded: 2018; 8 years ago
- Arena: Hengshui Stadium
- Capacity: 3,600
- Location: Hengshui, Hebei

Hebei Win Power is a Chinese professional women's basketball club in the Women's Chinese Basketball Association (WCBA), based in Hengshui, Hebei.

== Current players ==
Hebei Win Power roster
Players
Coaches

Pos.	No.	Nat.	Name	Ht.	Wt.
G	5	(China)	Qiu Siyue	1.78 m (5 ft 10 in)	75 kg (165 lb)
C	6	(China)	Fu Yu	1.90 m (6 ft 3 in)	85 kg (187 lb)
PF	8	(China)	Ma Xueya	1.90 m (6 ft 3 in)	85 kg (187 lb)
SF	9	(Chinese Taipei)	Huang Ping-jen	1.82 m (6 ft 0 in)	74 kg (163 lb)
SF	10	(China)	Huan Huan	1.87 m (6 ft 2 in)	88 kg (194 lb)
SF	11	(China)	Shang Lei	1.83 m (6 ft 0 in)	63 kg (139 lb)
SF	12	(China)	Shen Siyu	1.80 m (5 ft 11 in)	72 kg (159 lb)
F	16	(China)	Feng Xiaoqian	1.80 m (5 ft 11 in)	76 kg (168 lb)
F	17	(China)	Lu Yao	1.80 m (5 ft 11 in)	71 kg (157 lb)
F	18	(China)	Deng Yahui	1.78 m (5 ft 10 in)	75 kg (165 lb)
F	26	(China)	Xu Ran	1.85 m (6 ft 1 in)	80 kg (176 lb)
G	28	(China)	Huang Jingjing	1.75 m (5 ft 9 in)	63 kg (139 lb)
G	29	(China)	Wang Tianyun	1.78 m (5 ft 10 in)	71 kg (157 lb)
C	30	(United States)	Azurá Stevens	1.98 m (6 ft 6 in)	82 kg (181 lb)
C	51	(United States)	Jessica Breland	1.90 m (6 ft 3 in)	80 kg (176 lb)

Head coach

- (United States) Kareem Hodge

Assistant coach(es)

- (China) Yin Zhong
- (China) Han Jing

Legend

- (C) Team captain
- Injured
