= Ariel Massengale =

American basketball player

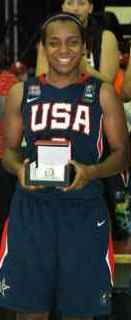

SIU Edwardsville Cougars
- Position: Assistant coach
- League: Ohio Valley Conference

Personal information
- Born: June 10, 1993 (age 33) Downers Grove, Illinois
- Listed height: 5 ft 6 in (1.68 m)

Career information
- High school: Bolingbrook (Bolingbrook, Illinois)
- College: Tennessee (2011–2015)
- WNBA draft: 2015: 3rd round, 29th overall pick
- Drafted by: Atlanta Dream
- Playing career: 2015–2016
- Coaching career: 2017–present

Career history

Playing
- 2016: Catz Lappeenranta

Coaching
- 2017–2019: Ole Miss (graduate assistant)
- 2019–2021: Lipscomb (assistant)
- 2021–2025: SIU Edwardsville (assistant)
- 2025–present: Wisconsin (assistant)

Career highlights
- SEC All-Freshman Team (2012); McDonald's All American (2011); Illinois Miss Basketball (2011)
- Stats at Basketball Reference
Medals
Representing United States
Basketball
World University Games
Gold medal – first place	2013 Kazan	Team
FIBA Under-19 World Cup
Gold medal – first place	2011 Chile	Team
FIBA Under-17 World Cup
Gold medal – first place	2010 France	Team
FIBA Americas U16 Championship
Gold medal – first place	2009 Mexico	Team

Ariel Massengale (born June 10, 1993) is an American professional basketball player.

== Career ==
=== College ===
Massengale played college basketball at the University of Tennessee in Knoxville, Tennessee for the Lady Volunteers.

=== Tennessee statistics ===
Legend
GP	Games played	GS	Games started	MPG	Minutes per game
FG%	Field goal percentage	3P%	3-point field goal percentage	FT%	Free throw percentage
RPG	Rebounds per game	APG	Assists per game	SPG	Steals per game
BPG	Blocks per game	PPG	Points per game	**Bold**	Career high

Year	Team	GP	Points	FG%	3P%	FT%	RPG	APG	SPG	BPG	PPG
2011-12	Tennessee	33	245	**38.7%**	33.3%	77.6%	2.3	4.9	1.4	**0.1**	7.4
2012-13	Tennessee	**35**	276	37.1%	35.1%	77.8%	2.6	4.5	1.0	0.0	7.9
2013-14	Tennessee	19	238	38.5%	**38.3%**	83.8%	3.2	**5.8**	**1.4**	-	**12.5**
2014-15	Tennessee	**35**	**402**	37.7%	36.6%	**86.0%**	**2.6**	2.5	0.7	-	11.5
Career		122	1161	37.9%	36.0%	81.2%	2.6	4.2	1.1	0.0	9.5

=== WNBA ===
In the 2015 WNBA draft, the Atlanta Dream selected Massengale in the third round as the twenty ninth pick overall. Massengale sat out the 2015 season, to rehab a knee injury. In 2016, Massengale returned to the league and made her professional debut with the Dream. However soon after, Massengale was released by the Dream.

=== Europe ===
Massengale headed to Europe, to play in Finland's Naisten Korisliiga with the Catz Lappeenranta for the 2016–17 season. After playing in twelve games, Massengale was released.

== National team ==
=== Youth level ===
Massengale made her international debut at the 2009 FIBA Americas Under-16 Championship in Mexico. She would then go on to represent the USA at both the 2010 FIBA Under-17 World Cup and the 2011 FIBA Under-19 World Cup, taking home the gold on both occasions. At the Under-19 World Cup, she earned a spot on the All-Tournament Team, alongside teammate Breanna Stewart.
