= Nirra Fields =

Canadian basketball player (born 1993)

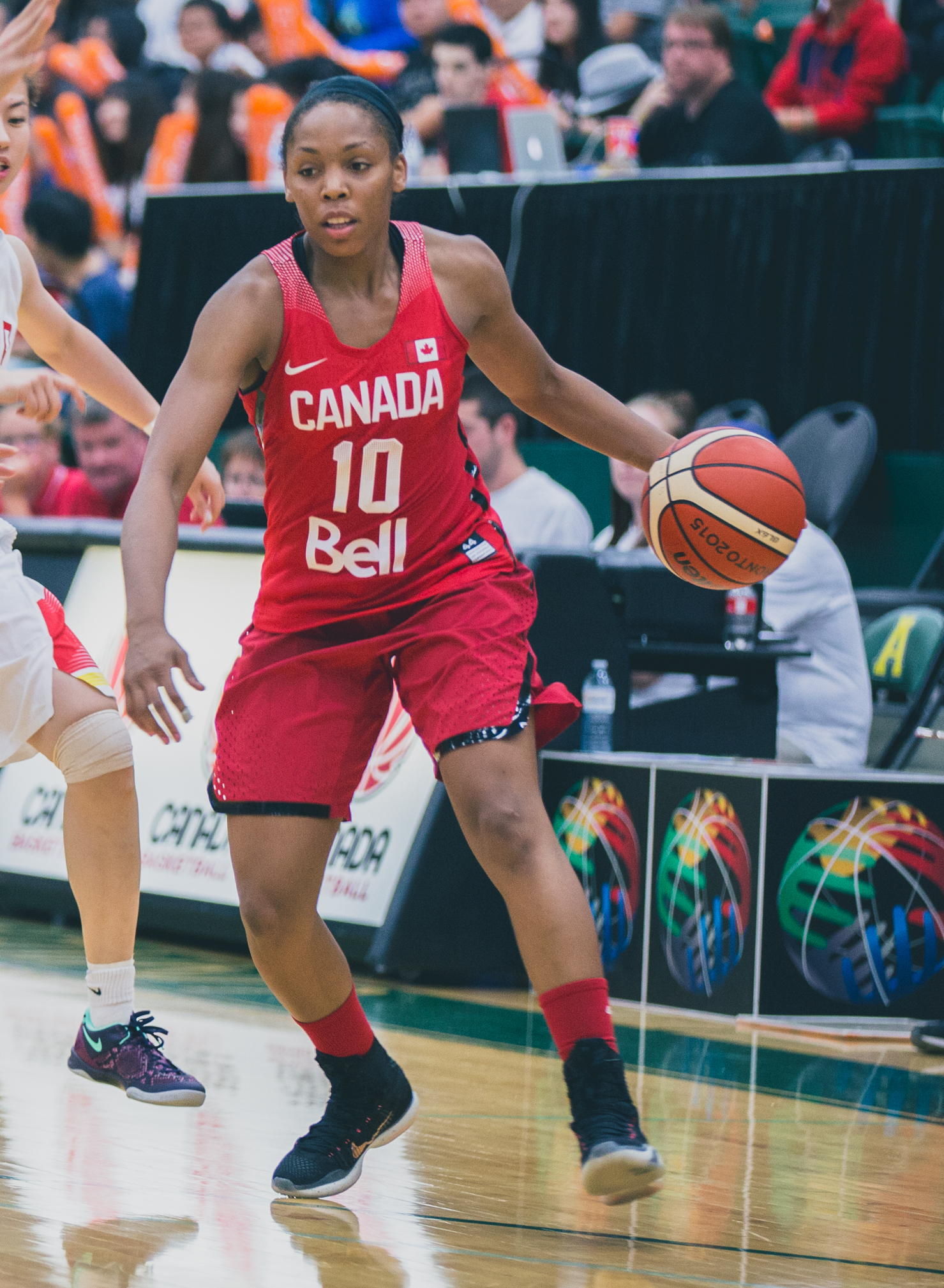
- Fields in 2016

No. 21 – İzmit Belediyespor
- Position: Point guard
- League: Women's Basketball Super League

Personal information
- Born: December 3, 1993 (age 32) Vancouver, British Columbia, Canada
- Listed height: 5 ft 9 in (1.75 m)
- Listed weight: 126 lb (57 kg)

Career information
- High school: Mater Dei (Santa Ana, California)
- College: UCLA (2012–2016)
- WNBA draft: 2016: 3rd round, 32nd overall pick
- Drafted by: Phoenix Mercury
- Playing career: 2016–present

Career history
- 2016: Phoenix Mercury
- 2016: Edremit Belediyesi Gürespor
- 2017–2018: UNI Győr
- 2018–2019: Energa Toruń
- 2020–2021: Antalya 07 Basketbol
- 2021–present: İzmit Belediyespor

Career highlights
- 3x All Pac-12 (2014–2016); McDonald's All-American (2012)
- Stats at Basketball Reference
Medals
Women's basketball
Representing Canada
Pan American Games
Gold medal – first place	2015 Toronto	Team
FIBA Women's AmeriCup
Gold medal – first place	2017 Buenos Aires
Bronze medal – third place	2023 León

Nirra Fields (born December 3, 1993) is a Canadian professional basketball player for İzmit Belediyespor of the Women's Basketball Super League. She played college basketball for the UCLA Bruins. After a successful career with the Bruins, Fields was drafted with the thirty-second pick in the 2016 WNBA draft by the Phoenix Mercury.

Fields represents the Canadian national team internationally, where she participated at the 2014 FIBA World Championship.

== High school ==
Fields started high school at Lakeside Academy in Montreal in 2007, followed by Lower Canada College for a year. The following year she spent at Regina High School in South Euclid, Ohio. She spent her junior year at Oak Hill Academy in Virginia, where she averaged 26.5 points per game. She transferred to Mater Dei High School in Santa Ana, California for her senior year. Although she only played for Mater Dei for one year, she made enough of an impact that the school retired her jersey at the end of the year. During the year, she averaged just over 22 points a game to help the team to a 34–3 record and a CIF SS Division 1AA state championship. She was named a McDonald's All-American and eligible to play in the McDonald's All-American game, the first female Canadian to earn such an honour.

== National team career ==
=== Youth ===
Fields played for Canada in the 2010 FIBA Under-17 World Championship for Women held in Toulouse and Rodez, France. She averaged 22.4 points and 6.9 rebounds per game. She scored 30 points against France and 36 against Japan. The following year, she played for the Canadian team in the 2011 FIBA Under-19 World Championship for Women held in Puerto Montt, Chile. She averaged 15.9 points and 5.4 rebounds per game and helped the team to a fifth-place finish with an 8–1 record.

=== Senior ===
In 2014, Fields played for the senior national team at the 2014 FIBA World Championship for Women held in Ankara and Istanbul, Turkey. She helped the team to a fifth-place finish with an overall record of 4–3. She averaged 5.7 points and 2.6 rebounds per game.

Fields represented Canada in basketball at the 2015 Pan American Games held in Toronto, Canada. Canada won all three preliminary games was against Venezuela, Argentina, and Cuba. Canada beat Brazil in the semifinal 91–63 to earn a spot in the gold-medal game against the USA.

The gold-medal game matched the host team Canada against the USA in a sold-out arena. Canada won the game and the gold-medal 81–73. It was Canada's first gold medal in basketball in the Pan Am games. Nurse was the star for Canada with 33 points, hitting 11 of her 12 free-throw attempts in 10 of her 17 field-goal attempts, including two of three three-pointers. Fields contributed seven rebounds to lead the team and nine points.

== Career statistics ==
Legend
GP	Games played	GS	Games started	MPG	Minutes per game	RPG	Rebounds per game
APG	Assists per game	SPG	Steals per game	BPG	Blocks per game	PPG	Points per game
TO	Turnovers per game	FG%	Field-goal percentage	3P%	3-point field-goal percentage	FT%	Free-throw percentage
**Bold**	Career best	°	League leader

=== WNBA ===
Year	Team	GP	GS	MPG	FG%	3P%	FT%	RPG	APG	SPG	BPG	TO	PPG
2016	Phoenix	4	0	4.3	14.3	0	50.0	0	0	0	0	0.5	0.8

=== College ===
Year	Team	GP	GS	MPG	FG%	3P%	FT%	RPG	APG	SPG	BPG	TO	PPG
2012-13	UCLA	33	2	19.3	37.3	**36.2**	61.2	3.5	1.0	1.2	0.4	2.0	7.8
2013-14	UCLA	31	30	**34.8**	38.9	30.3	**69.4**	**6.3**	**2.3**	2.2	**0.6**	2.5	**17.6**
2014-15	UCLA	**36**	**33**	31.4	38.8	27.2	62.5	5.4	1.8	**2.3**	0.3	**2.9**	15.0
2015-16	UCLA	34	**33**	30.2	**41.5**	33.0	62.7	5.4	1.9	2.1	**0.6**	2.1	15.3
Career		134	98	28.9	39.3	30.7	64.6	5.1	1.7	2.0	0.5	2.4	13.9
