= Andrea Vilaró =

Spanish basketball player

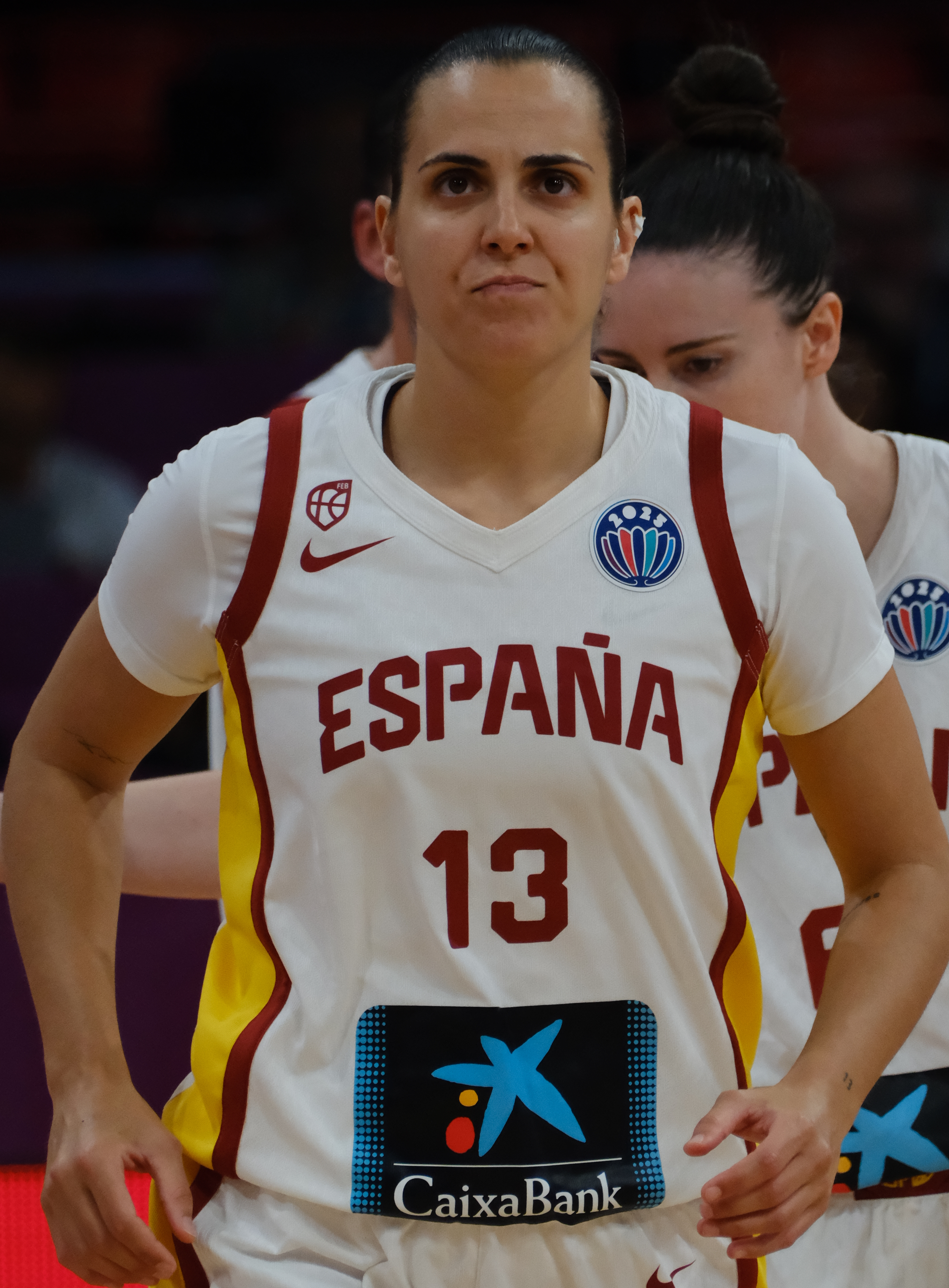

No. 13 – Perfumerías Avenida
- Position: Small forward
- League: LF Spain

Personal information
- Born: 9 May 1993 (age 33) Barcelona, Spain
- Listed height: 6 ft 1 in (1.85 m)

Career information
- College: Florida (2011–2012)
- Playing career: 2008–present

Career history
- 2008–2011: Segle XXI (youth/LF2)
- 2012–2013: CD Zamarat
- 2013–2014: CB Ciudad de Burgos
- 2014–2015: CB Al-Qázeres
- 2015–2019: Cadí La Seu
- 2019–present: Perfumerías Avenida

Career highlights
- Spanish League champion (2021); Spanish Cup champion (2020)

Andrea Vilaró Aragonés (Note: In this Spanish name, the first or paternal surname is Vilaró and the second or maternal family name is Aragonés.) (born 9 May 1993) is a Spanish basketball player. She plays as a small forward in the Spanish league for CB Avenida and the Spanish national team.

== Club career ==
Vilaró started playing with the youth teams of Segle XXI in 2006, reaching the senior team and playing in the Spanish League second tier for the last two seasons. She played for the Florida Gators for the 2011-12 season. From 2012 to 2015 she played for three clubs in the Spanish top tier league: CD Zamarat, CB Ciudad de Burgos and CB Al-Qázeres. She spent the following four seasons, 2015-2019, at Cadí La Seu. On 10 May 2019, she signed for CB Avenida, one of the top teams of the league.

=== EuroCup statistics ===
Season	Team	GP	MPP	PPP	RPP	APP
2019–20 EuroCup	Perfumerías Avenida	10	20.9	5.1	2.2	2.4
2020-21 EuroLeague	Perfumerías Avenida	8	14.3	3.5	1.8	0.9

== National team ==
Vilaró started playing with Spain's youth teams at 15, winning a total of six medals from 2008 to 2013. She made her debut with the senior team in 2019, when she was 26 years old, becoming champion of the FIBA Women's EuroBasket 2019.

- 2008 FIBA Europe Under-16 Championship (youth)
- 2009 FIBA Europe Under-16 Championship (youth) (All-Tournament Team)
- 8th 2010 FIBA Under-17 World Championship (youth)
- 2010 FIBA Europe Under-18 Championship (youth)
- 2011 FIBA Europe Under-18 Championship (youth)
- 2012 FIBA Europe Under-20 Championship (youth)
- 2013 FIBA Europe Under-20 Championship (youth)
- 2019 Eurobasket
