= Senegal women's national under-16 basketball team =

Senegal
- FIBA zone: FIBA Africa
- National federation: Fédération Sénégalaise de Basket-Ball

U17 World Cup
- Appearances: None

U16 AfroBasket
- Appearances: 1 (2009)
- Medals: None

The Senegal women's national under-16 basketball team is a national basketball team of Senegal, administered by the Fédération Sénégalaise de Basket-Ball. It represents the country in international under-16 women's basketball competitions.

== FIBA U16 Women's AfroBasket participations ==
Senegal participated at the 2009 FIBA Africa Under-16 Championship for Women where they finished in 5th place.

== See also ==
- Senegal women's national basketball team
- Senegal women's national under-19 basketball team
- Senegal men's national under-16 basketball team
