= Algeria women's national under-16 basketball team =

Algeria
- FIBA zone: FIBA Africa
- National federation: Algerian Basketball Federation

U17 World Cup
- Appearances: None

U16 AfroBasket
- Appearances: 3
- Medals: (bronze) Bronze: 1 (2021)

The Algeria women's national under-16 basketball team is a national basketball team of Algeria, administered by the Algerian Basketball Federation. It represents the country in international under-16 women's basketball competitions.

== FIBA U16 Women's AfroBasket participations ==
| Year | Result |
|---|---|
| 2009 | 4th |
| 2011 | 5th |
| 2021 | 3rd place, bronze medalist(s) |

== See also ==
- Algeria women's national basketball team
- Algeria women's national under-18 basketball team
- Algeria men's national under-16 basketball team
