= ASPTT Arras =

Arras Pays d'Artois
- Founded: 2007
- Arena: Halle des Sports Richard Tetelin
- Location: Arras, France
- Team colors: blue and pink
- President: Bernard Pot
- Head coach: Bruno Blier
Home	Away

Arras Pays d'Artois is a French women's basketball team based in the city of Arras, playing in the Ligue Féminine de Basketball. Formerly a section of multisports club ASPTT Arras, it became an independent club in 2008.

It reached the final of the 2010-11 FIBA EuroCup, lost to Elitzur Ramla.

== 2011-12 roster ==
- (Russia) Nadezhda Grishaeva (1.95)
- (Democratic Republic of the Congo) Pauline Akonga (1.88)
- (France) Sabrina Reghaissia (1.88)
- (France) Laury Aulnette (1.87)
- (France) Soana Lucet (1.86)
- (France) Juliana Mialoundana (1.85)
- (France) Krissy Bade (1.82)
- (France) Alexandra Tchangoue (1.80)
- (Switzerland) Alexia Rol (1.75)
- (France) Adja Konteh (1.73)
- (France) Joelly Belleka (1.68)
- (France) Joyce Cousseins (1.65)
- (United States) Leilani Mitchell (1.65)

== Coaches ==
- Bruno Blier, assisted by Cécile Constanty
- Thibaut Petit

== Notable players ==
- (Romania) Gabriela Mărginean

== See also ==
- Sport in France
