= Tayla Roberts =

Australian basketball player

Dandenong Rangers
- Position: Forward
- League: WNBL

Personal information
- Born: 16 February 1993 (age 33) Launceston, Tasmania
- Listed height: 6 ft 3 in (1.91 m)

Career information
- Playing career: 2009–present

Career history
- 2009–2111: Australian Institute of Sport
- 2011–2012: Bulleen Boomers
- 2012–2013: Sydney Uni Flames
- 2014–2015: Bendigo Spirit
- 2015–2016: Melbourne Boomers
- 2016–2017: Adelaide Lightning
- 2017–present: Dandenong Rangers

Career highlights
- WNBL Rookie of the Year (2010)
Medals
Representing Australia
Basketball
FIBA Under-16 Oceania Championship
Gold medal – first place	2009 Australia	Team

Tayla Roberts (born 16 February 1993) is an Australian professional basketball boomerang.

== Professional career ==
=== WNBL ===
Roberts began her professional career in 2009, for the Australian Institute of Sport. She would later to go on to receive the WNBL Rookie of the Year Award. Roberts has spent time with a range of WNBL teams in her young career. After the AIS, Roberts was signed by the then defending champions, Bulleen Boomers. She then had a one-season stint with the Sydney Uni Flames. After a one-year absence, she then signed with the defending champions in the Bendigo Spirit. For the 2015–16 season, she returned to Victoria, with the rebranded Melbourne Boomers.

== National team ==
=== Youth level ===
Roberts had an extremely successful and influential youth career for the Australian national team. Roberts made her international debut at the 2009 FIBA Oceania Under-16 Championship in Brisbane, Australia, where she took home Gold and secured Australia's place at the inaugural Under-17 World Championship the following year. Roberts would go on to represent Australia at the FIBA World Championship in France where Australia placed seventh. At this tournament Roberts averaged 16.1 points per game. She then transitioned to represent the Gems at the 2011 FIBA Under-19 World Championship in Chile. At this tournament she was the highest scorer in any single game, scoring 41 points against Japan. Despite averaging 15.9 points per game on a strong Australian team, the team narrowly missed out on bronze, placing fourth.
