= 2021 FIBA U16 Women's African Championship =

2021 FIBA U16 Women's AfroBasket
7th FIBA Under-16 Women's African Basketball Championship

Tournament details
- Host country: Egypt
- City: Cairo
- Dates: 7–15 August 2021
- Teams: 6 (from 1 confederation)
- Venue(s): 1 (in 1 host city)

Final positions
- Champions: Mali (7th title)
- Runners-up: Egypt
- Third place: Algeria

Official website
- www.fiba.basketball/history

The 2021 FIBA U16 Women's African Championship was the seventh edition of the under-16 women's African basketball championship. The tournament was held in Cairo, Egypt, from 7 to 15 August 2021. It served as a qualifier for the 2022 FIBA U17 Women's Basketball World Cup in Debrecen, Hungary.

== Venue ==
Cairo	2021 FIBA U16 Women's African Championship is located in Egypt
Cairo Stadium Indoor Halls Complex; Halls 3 and 4 (Capacity: each 720)	2021 FIBA U16 Women's African Championship is located in Egypt
Image	2021 FIBA U16 Women's African Championship is located in Egypt

== Participating teams ==
- Egypt
- Algeria
- Chad
- Gabon
- Mali
- Uganda

== Group phase ==
All times are local (Egypt Standard Time – UTC+2).

Pos	Team	Pld	W	L	PF	PA	PD	Pts	Qualification
1	Egypt (H)	5	5	0	440	106	+334	10	Semifinals
2	Mali	5	4	1	483	132	+351	9	Semifinals
3	Algeria	5	3	2	193	297	−104	8	Semifinals
4	Uganda	5	2	3	182	291	−109	7	Semifinals
5	Chad	5	1	4	175	216	−41	6	
6	Gabon	5	0	5	96	527	−431	5	

Source: FIBA
(H) Hosts

7 August 2021
13:30

Boxscore

Mali	92–12	Uganda
Scoring by quarter: 26–2, 26–0, 19–8, 21–2

Cairo Stadium Indoor Hall 3

7 August 2021
16:30

Boxscore

Gabon	18–73	Algeria
Scoring by quarter: 9–16, 2–11, 0–28, 7–18

Cairo Stadium Indoor Hall 3

7 August 2021
20:00

Boxscore

Chad	0–20 (Awarded)	Egypt

Cairo Stadium Indoor Hall 4

8 August 2021
13:30

Boxscore

Gabon	14–153	Mali
Scoring by quarter: 0–44, 14–33, 0–40, 0–36

Cairo Stadium Indoor Hall 3

8 August 2021
17:00

Boxscore

Egypt	101–23	Algeria
Scoring by quarter: 28–10, 29–5, 25–2, 19–6

Cairo Stadium Indoor Hall 4

8 August 2021
19:30

Boxscore

Chad	39–56	Uganda
Scoring by quarter: 7–8, 10–18, 6–15, 16–15

Cairo Stadium Indoor Hall 3

9 August 2021
13:30

Boxscore

Algeria	18–104	Mali
Scoring by quarter: 6–33, 4–27, 6–17, 2–27

Cairo Stadium Indoor Hall 3

9 August 2021
17:00

Boxscore

Uganda	17–89	Egypt
Scoring by quarter: 0–22, 10–19, 5–29, 2–19

Cairo Stadium Indoor Hall 4

9 August 2021
19:30

Boxscore

Chad	84–29	Gabon
Scoring by quarter: 18–10, 16–7, 27–8, 23–4

Cairo Stadium Indoor Hall 3

11 August 2021
13:30

Boxscore

Algeria	33–30	Chad
Scoring by quarter: 8–6, 8–10, 5–12, 12–2

Cairo Stadium Indoor Hall 3

11 August 2021
17:00

Boxscore

Egypt	66–56	Mali
Scoring by quarter: 26–16, 8–12, 13–18, 19–10

Cairo Stadium Indoor Hall 4

11 August 2021
19:30

Boxscore

Uganda	53–25	Gabon
Scoring by quarter: 14–2, 6–12, 18–4, 15–7

Cairo Stadium Indoor Hall 3

12 August 2021
13:30

Boxscore

Mali	78–22	Chad
Scoring by quarter: 14–6, 26–7, 13–5, 25–4

Cairo Stadium Indoor Hall 3

12 August 2021
17:00

Boxscore

Egypt	164–10	Gabon
Scoring by quarter: 42–5, 36–0, 46–2, 40–3

Cairo Stadium Indoor Hall 4

12 August 2021
19:30

Boxscore

Uganda	44–46	Algeria
Scoring by quarter: 12–18, 9–11, 18–2, 5–15

Cairo Stadium Indoor Hall 3

== Playoffs ==
Semifinals
1	Egypt	119
4	Uganda	42
2	Mali	79
3	Algeria	14

Final
1	Egypt	65
2	Mali	68
Third place match
4	Uganda	51
3	Algeria	53

=== Semifinals ===
14 August 2021
11:00

Boxscore

Mali	79–14	Algeria
Scoring by quarter: 12–5, 17–2, 25–0, 25–7

Cairo Stadium Indoor Hall 4

14 August 2021
17:00

Boxscore

Egypt	119–42	Uganda
Scoring by quarter: 33–8, 28–13, 27–3, 31–18

Cairo Stadium Indoor Hall 4

=== Third place match ===
15 August 2021
11:00

Boxscore

Uganda	51–53	Algeria
Scoring by quarter: 18–16, 2–16, 20–9, 11–12

Cairo Stadium Indoor Hall 4

=== Final ===
15 August 2021
17:00

Boxscore

Egypt	65–68	Mali
Scoring by quarter: 13–16, 16–13, 20–17, 16–22

Cairo Stadium Indoor Hall 4

== Final standings ==
Rank	Team	Record
1st place, gold medalist(s)	Mali	6–1
2nd place, silver medalist(s)	Egypt	6–1
3rd place, bronze medalist(s)	Algeria	4–3
4	Uganda	2–5
5	Chad	1–4
6	Gabon	0–5

Qualified for the 2022 FIBA Under-17 Basketball World Cup

== Awards ==
2021 FIBA Africa U16 Championship for Women winners

Mali
Seventh title

Most Valuable Player
(Mali) Rokiatou Berthe

=== All-Tournament Team ===
- (Mali) Rokiatou Berthe
- (Mali) Alimata Coulibaly
- F (Egypt) Jana Elalfy
- G (Egypt) Sarah Metwally
- G (Egypt) Hana Abdelaal

== See also ==
- 2021 FIBA U16 African Championship (Men)
- 2022 FIBA U17 Women's Basketball World Cup
