= 2009 FIBA Africa Under-16 Championship for Women =

2009 FIBA U16 Women's AfroBasket
1st FIBA Under-16 Women's African Basketball Championship

Tournament details
- Host country: Mali
- Dates: August 30–September 5
- Teams: 8
- Venue: 1 (in 1 host city)

Final positions
- Champions: Mali (2nd title)

Tournament statistics
- MVP: (Mali) Farima Touré
- Top scorer: (Algeria) Ribah 18.8
- Top rebounds: (Senegal) N'Diaye 17
- Top assists: (Mali) Sissoko 3.4
- PPG (Team): Egypt (64.4)
- RPG (Team): Mali (51.4)
- APG (Team): Mali (10.6)

Official website
- 2009 FIBA Africa Championship for Women U-16

The 2009 FIBA Africa Under-16 Championship for Women (alternatively the Afrobasket U16) was the 1st U-16 FIBA Africa championship for women, played under the auspices of the Fédération Internationale de Basketball, the basketball sport governing body and qualified for the 2010 World Cup. The tournament was held from August 30–September 5 in Bamako, Mali, contested by 8 national teams and won by Mali.

The tournament qualified the winner for the 2010 U17 World Women's Championship.

== Teams ==
- Algeria
- Angola
- Egypt
- Mali
- Senegal

== Format ==
- The five teams who participated played in a single round-robin preliminary round.
- After the preliminaries, only the top two teams qualified for the gold medal match to determine the African Champions and represent the FIBA Africa at the 2010 FIBA Basketball Under-17 Women's World Cup.

== Preliminary round ==
Times given below are in UTC.

Pos	Team	Pld	W	L	PF	PA	PD	Pts	Qualification
1	Egypt	4	4	0	258	169	+89	8	Advanced to the finals
2	Mali	4	3	1	238	184	+54	7	Advanced to the finals
3	Angola	4	2	2	225	221	+4	6	
4	Algeria	4	1	3	201	236	−35	5	
5	Senegal	4	0	4	174	286	−112	4	

Source: Unknown
Rules for classification: 1) Points; 2) Goal difference; 3) Number of goals scored;

30 August 2009
17:00

Report

Mali	45–46	Egypt
Scoring by quarter: 9–17, 8–11, 10–4, 18–14
Pts: Maiga 12; Rebs: Sanou 11; Asts: Konaté 2		Pts: Amer 16; Rebs: Attia 7 Asts: Amr 2

Pavillon Modibo Kéita Bamako

30 August 2009
19:00

Report

Angola	50–48	Algeria
Scoring by quarter: 17-10, 12-14, 10-14, 11-10
Pts: A.Gonçalves 15; Rebs: A.Gonçalves 12; Asts: Artemis 3		Pts: Ribah 18; Rebs: Meribout 9 Asts: Boukerma 4

Pavillon Modibo Kéita Bamako

31 August 2009
17:00

Report

Angola	45–57	Mali
Scoring by quarter: 13-8, 11-9, 7-14, 14-26
Pts: Artemis 26; Rebs: A.Gonçalves 9 Asts: Lizeth 2		Pts: Konaté 19; Rebs: Sanou 15; Asts: Sissoko 6

Pavillon Modibo Kéita Bamako

1 September 2009
21:00

Report

Senegal	37–83	Egypt
Scoring by quarter: 5-20, 7-18, 9-27, 16-18
Pts: Diop 16; Rebs: N'Diaye 14; Asts: Sarr 1		Pts: Amer 23; Rebs: Amer 8 Asts: Salem 2

Pavillon Modibo Kéita Bamako

1 September 2009
17:00

Report

Algeria	58–71	Mali
Scoring by quarter: 11-16, 13-15, 13-12, 21-28
Pts: Ribah 14; Rebs: Boubaker 9 Asts: Ribah 4		Pts: Sissoko 20; Rebs: Sanou 12; Asts: Konaté 5

Pavillon Modibo Kéita Bamako

2 September 2009
17:00

Report

Senegal	51–78	Angola
Scoring by quarter: 21-19, 11-16, 10-19, 9-24
Pts: N'Diaye 24; Rebs: N'Diaye 16; Asts: Diallo 1		Pts: Artemis 17; Rebs: A.Gonçalves 11; Asts: Cláudia 3

Pavillon Modibo Kéita Bamako

3 September 2009
17:00

Report

Algeria	60–51	Senegal
Scoring by quarter: 7-19, 22-8, 19-12, 12-12
Pts: Ribah 26; Rebs: Boubaker 7 Asts: Belmeine 6		Pts: Diop 14; Rebs: N'Diaye 16; Asts: Diagne 2

Pavillon Modibo Kéita Bamako

3 September 2009
19:00

Report

Egypt	65–52	Angola
Scoring by quarter: 13-7, 19-6, 17-17, 16-22
Pts: Amer 13; Rebs: Amer 11; Asts: Moussa 6		Pts: Artemis 17; Rebs: A.Gonçalves 7 Asts: Artemis 2

Pavillon Modibo Kéita Bamako

4 September 2009
19:00

Report

Egypt	64–35	Algeria
Scoring by quarter: 18-11, 18-0, 13-15, 15-9
Pts: Amer 14; Rebs: Amer 12; Asts: Gamal 4		Pts: Ribah 17; Rebs: Slimani 8 Asts: Ribah 2

Pavillon Modibo Kéita Bamako

4 September 2009
17:00

Report

Mali	65–35	Senegal
Scoring by quarter: 17-6, 18-10, 14-6, 16-13
Pts: Sanou 20; Rebs: Touré 11; Asts: Lougue 1		Pts: Diop 11; Rebs: N'Diaye 22; Asts: N'Diaye 3

Pavillon Modibo Kéita Bamako

=== Gold medal game ===
5 September 2009
17:00

Report

Egypt	64–78	Mali
Scoring by quarter: 15–19, 22–15, 16–22, 11–22
Pts: Ragab 16; Rebs: Amer 15; Asts: Amer 2		Pts: Touré 20; Rebs: Touré 17; Asts: Sissoko 5

Pavillon Modibo Kéita Bamako

== Final standings ==
Rank	Team	Record
Gold medal	Mali	4–1
Silver medal	Egypt	4–1
Bronze medal	Angola	2–2
4.	Algeria	1–3
5.	Senegal	0–4

== Awards ==
2009 FIBA Africa Under-16 Championship for Women winner

Mali
First title

Most Valuable Player
(Mali) Farima Touré

=== All-Tournament Team ===
- G (Angola) Artemis Afonso
- G (Egypt) Reem Moussa
- F (Senegal) N'Dèye N'Diaye
- F (Egypt) Hagar Amer
- C (Mali) Farima Touré

== Statistical leaders ==
=== Individual Tournament Highs ===
Points

Rank	Name	G	Pts	PPG
1	(Algeria) Manel Ribah	4	75	18.8
2	(Angola) Artemis Afonso	4	74	18.5
3	(Egypt) Hagar Amer	5	80	16
4	(Senegal) Satta Diop	4	54	13.5
5	(Senegal) N'dèye N'diaye	4	45	11.3
6	(Mali) Farima Touré	5	55	11
7	(Mali) Mariam Maiga	5	53	10.6
7	(Mali) Sadio Konaté	5	53	10.6
9	(Angola) Ana Gonçalves	4	42	10.5
10	(Mali) Fatoumata Sanou	5	48	9.6

Rebounds

Rank	Name	G	Rbs	RPG
1	(Senegal) N'dèye N'diaye	4	119	17
2	(Mali) Fatoumata Sanou	5	89	10.6
3	(Egypt) Hagar Amer	5	55	10
4	(Mali) Farima Touré	5	72	10
5	(Angola) Ana Gonçalves	4	57	9.8
6	(Mali) Aminata Traoré	5	57	9.4
7	(Algeria) Yasmina Slimani	4	38	7.2
8	(Mali) Sadio Konaté	5	66	6.8
9	(Angola) Artemis Afonso	4	50	6.5
10	(Angola) Lizeth N'Dombele	4	54	5.8

Assists

Rank	Name	G	Ast	APG
1	(Mali) Aminata Sissoko	5	17	3.4
2	(Algeria) Nesrine Boukerma	4	10	2.5
3	(Mali) Sadio Konaté	5	11	2.2
4	(Mali) Fanta Guindo	5	10	2
4	(Egypt) Reem Moussa	5	10	2
6	(Angola) Artemis Afonso	4	8	2
6	(Algeria) Norelhoida Belmeine	4	8	2
8	(Angola) Cláudia Manuel	4	6	1.5
8	(Algeria) Manel Ribah	4	6	1.5
10	(Egypt) Hagar Amer	5	7	1.4

Steals

Rank	Name	G	Sts	SPG
1	(Mali) Fanta Guindo	5	11	2.2
1	(Mali) Farima Touré	5	11	2.2
3	(Egypt) Asmaa Gamal	5	10	2
4	(Egypt) Dina Amr	5	8	1.6
4	(Senegal) Sadio Konaté	5	8	1.6
6	(Angola) Analzira Américo	4	6	1.5
6	(Algeria) Ikbal Chenaf	4	6	1.5
6	(Senegal) Ndeye Siagne	4	6	1.5
6	(Angola) Cláudia Manuel	4	6	1.5
10	(Mali) Aminata Traoré	5	7	1.4

Blocks

Rank	Name	G	Bks	BPG
1	(Egypt) Hala Elshaarawy	5	5	1
2	(Algeria) Nesrine Boukerma	4	4	1
3	(Angola) Artemis Afonso	4	3	0.8
4	(Egypt) Hagar Amer	5	3	0.6
5	(Algeria) Ikbal Chenaf	4	2	0.5
5	(Angola) Helena Francisco	4	2	0.5
7	(Egypt) Farida Emara	5	2	0.4
7	(Mali) Aminata Traoré	5	2	0.4
9	(Algeria) Fatima Belarbi	4	1	0.2
9	(Algeria) Nour Boubaker	4	1	0.2

Minutes

Rank	Name	G	Min	MPG
1	(Senegal) N'dèye N'diaye	7	146	36.5
2	(Algeria) Manel Ribah	4	135	33.8
3	(Algeria) Nesrine Boukerma	7	131	32.8
4	(Angola) Ana Gonçalves	7	129	32.3
5	(Mali) Aminata Sissoko	4	157	31.4
6	(Angola) Artemis Afonso	7	125	31.3
7	(Senegal) Satta Diop	6	125	31.3
8	(Mali) Sadio Konaté	4	143	28.6
9	(Algeria) Yasmina Slimani	7	114	28.5
10	(Angola) Lizeth N'Dombele	5	112	28

=== Individual Game Highs ===
Department	Name	Total	Opponent
Points	(Angola) Artemis Afonso (Algeria) Manel Ribah	26	Mali; Senegal
Rebounds	(Senegal) N'Dèye Fatou N'Diaye	22	Mali
Assists	(Algeria) Norelhouda Belmeine (Egypt) Reem Moussa (Mali) Aminata Sissoko	6	Senegal; Angola; Angola
Steals	(Egypt) Dina Amr	6	Senegal
Blocks	(Angola) Artemis Afonso	3	Egypt
2-point field goal percentage	(Egypt) Dina Amr	83.3% (5/6)	Angola
3-point field goal percentage	(Mali) Sadio Konaté	71.4% (5/7)	Egypt
Free throw percentage	(Egypt) Reem Osama	100% (6/6)	Algeria
Turnovers	(Senegal) Satta Diop	9	Egypt

=== Team Tournament Highs ===
Points per Game

Pos.	Name	PPG
1	Egypt	64.4
2	Mali	63.2
3	Angola	56.3
4	Algeria	50.3
5	Senegal	43.5

Total Points

Pos.	Name	PPG
1	Egypt	322
2	Mali	316
3	Angola	225
4	Algeria	201
5	Senegal	174

Rebounds

Pos.	Name	RPG
1	Mali	51.4
2	Algeria	35.5
2	Senegal	35.5
4	Egypt	34.4
5	Angola	34.2

Assists

Pos.	Name	APG
1	Mali	10.6
2	Egypt	10
3	Algeria	7.3
4	Angola	6.8
5	Senegal	4.3

Steals

Pos.	Name	SPG
1	Egypt	10
2	Mali	9.6
3	Algeria	6.8
4	Angola	6.3
5	Senegal	5.5

Blocks

Pos.	Name	BPG
1	Algeria	2.2
1	Egypt	2.2
3	Angola	1.8
4	Mali	0.6
5	Senegal	0.2

2-point field goal percentage

Pos.	Name	%
1	Egypt	46.4
2	Algeria	37.3
3	Angola	36.3
4	Mali	36.2
5	Senegal	30.6

3-point field goal percentage

Pos.	Name	%
1	Mali	24.5
2	Angola	19
3	Algeria	18.2
4	Senegal	18
5	Egypt	17.2

Free throw percentage

Pos.	Name	%
1	Angola	54.8
2	Algeria	50.4
3	Egypt	48.9
4	Mali	47.5
5	Egypt	37.2

=== Team Game highs ===
Department	Name	Total	Opponent
Points	Egypt	83	Senegal
Rebounds	Mali	61	Angola
Assists	Mali	18	Algeria
Steals	Egypt	17	Senegal
Blocks	Algeria	4	Mali
2-point field goal percentage	Algeria	59.3% (16/27)	Senegal
3-point field goal percentage	Mali	58.3% (7/12)	Egypt
Free throw percentage	Egypt	66.7% (16/24)	Algeria
Turnovers	Senegal	31	Egypt

== See also ==
- 2009 FIBA Africa Championship for Women
