= Adja Konteh =

French basketball player

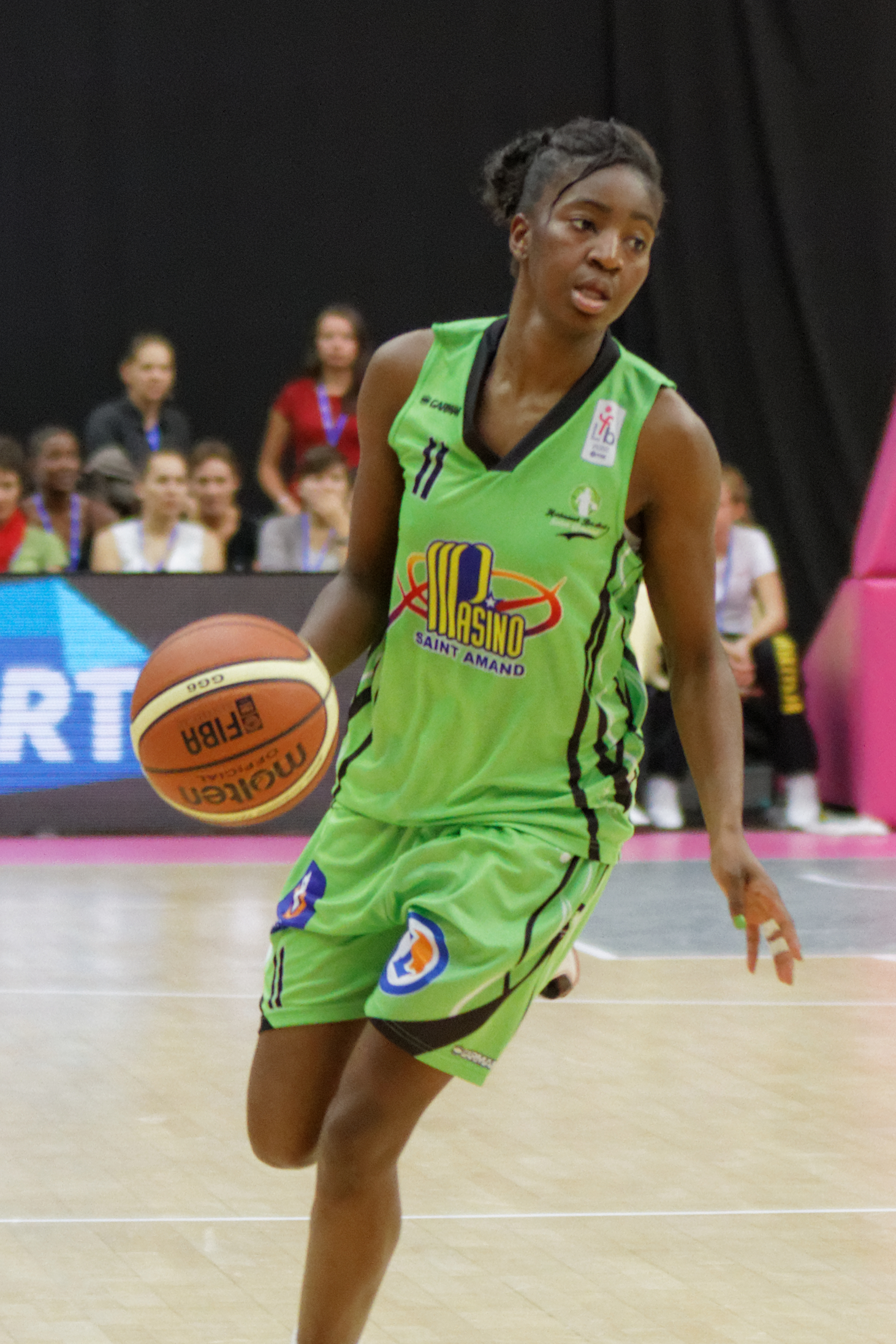
Image of Adja Konteh

Adja Konteh (born 5 March 1992 in Nantes, France) is a French basketball player who plays for ASPTT Arras in the League féminine de basket, the top women's basketball league in France.
