= Soraya Mohamed =

Egyptian basketball player

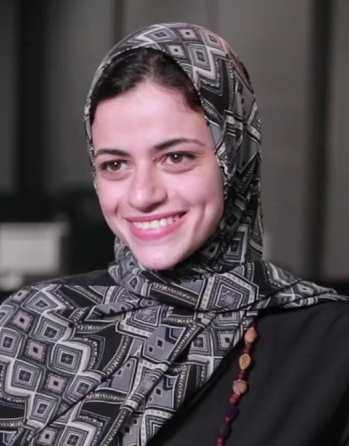

Al Ahly

Personal information
- Born: 1994 or 1995 (age 31–32)
- Listed height: 5 ft 8 in (1.73 m)

Soraya Mohamed is an Egyptian basketball player who plays for Al Ahly and Egypt women's national basketball team. Nicknamed "The Queen of Egypt", she was the first Egyptian woman to win an individual title at the Africa Cup. She won her first MVP at the U16 African Cup named the MVP for the second time at the U18 Africa Cup in 2012 when Egypt finished third.

== Career ==
Mohamed started playing basketball and tennis at Egypt's Shooting Club at the age of eight but found herself more interested in basketball as she had to choose just one sport to play.

At the age of fifteen, she joined the national basketball team where she played in the U16 category that finished second at the Africa Cup. In 2012, she won the MVP for the second time at the U18 Africa Cup 2012 where Egypt finished third.

In 2019, she represented Egypt in 3x3 at the 2019 FIBA Africa Cup Qualifiers where she was named Top Scorer and the MVP of the tournament. FIBA also named her among the 10 best female players who defined the 2019 FIBA 3×3 Africa Cup alongside Michelle Plouffe, Laetitia Guapo, Mai Yamamoto, Migna Toure, JiaYin Jiang.
