= Hagar Amer =

Egyptian basketball player

No. 14 – Alexandria Sporting Club
- Position: Power forward

Personal information
- Born: 10 November 1993
- Listed height: 6 ft 1 in (1.85 m)

Career information
- College: Arab Academy for Science, Technology and Maritime Transport

Hagar Amer (born 10 November 1993) is a professional Egyptian basketball player and captain for Alexandria Sporting Club (ASC). She was named the MVP at the 2022 FIBA Africa Champions Cup.

== Career ==
Amer started playing basketball at the age of four at Alexandria Sporting Club.

=== As a lecturer ===
Amer works as an assistant lecturer at the Industrial Engineering Department of the Arab Academy for Science, Technology and Maritime Transport.

=== As a basketball player ===
Amer helped Egypt to second place at the 2009 FIBA Africa U16 Championship for Women held in Bamako, Mali. In 2011, she participated at FIBA U19 Women's Basketball World Cup where she averaged 19.2 points and 8.8 rebounds per game.

She made her first appearance at the Women's AfroBasket held in Maputo in 2013, where she helped Egypt to an eight-place finish.

In 2022, she helped ASC to win the 2022 FIBA Africa Champions Cup Women in Maputo, Mozambique, also named the MVP of the tournament where she averaged 15 points and rebounds in six games.
