= Ma Xueya =

Chinese basketball player

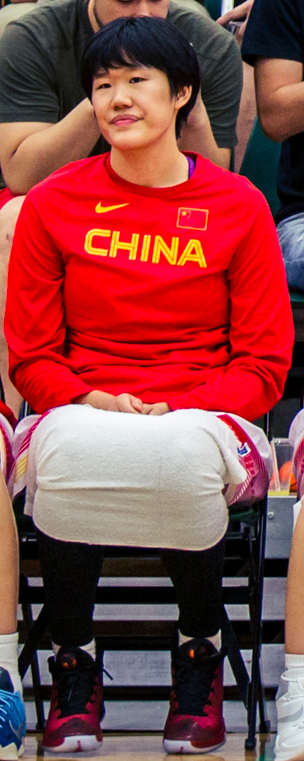
- Ma Xueya in 2016

No. 8 – Hebei Win Power
- Position: Power forward
- League: WCBA

Personal information
- Born: 16 December 1993 (age 32) Handan, Hebei, China
- Listed height: 6 ft 2 in (1.88 m)

Career information
- WNBA draft: 2015: undrafted
- Playing career: 2012–present

Career history
- 2012–16: Shanxi Flame
- 2016–17: Xinjiang Magic Deer
- 2017–18: Shanxi Flame
- 2018–present: Hebei Win Power

Ma Xueya (Chinese: 马雪雅, born 16 December 1993) is a Chinese basketball player. She represented China at the 2018 FIBA Women's Basketball World Cup.
