= Ksenia Tikhonenko =

Kazakhstani-Russian basketball player

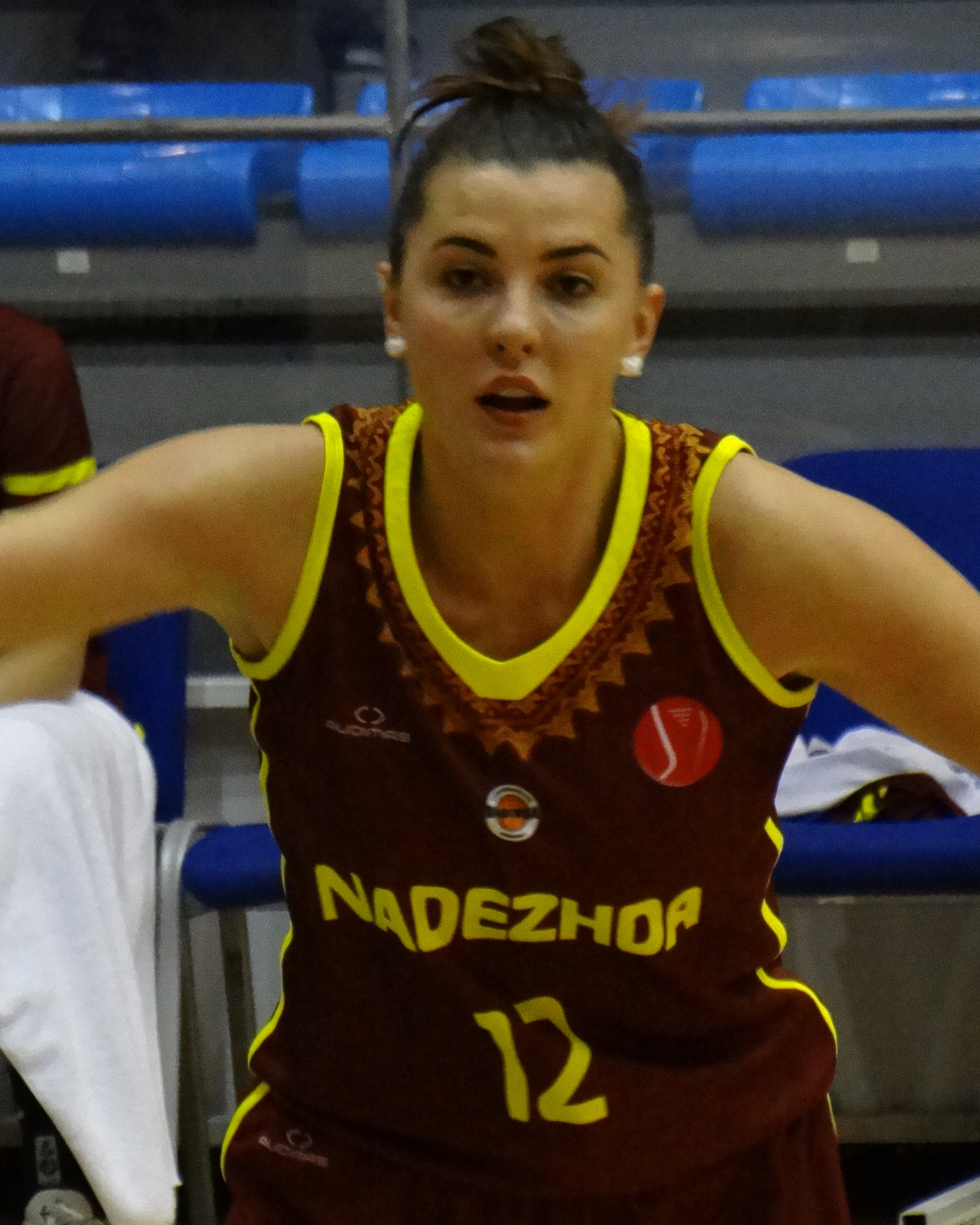
- Tikhonenko in 2017

Nadezhda Orenburg
- Position: Power forward / center

Personal information
- Born: 11 January 1993 (age 33) Almaty, Kazakhstan
- Listed height: 1.93 m (6 ft 4 in)

Career information
- Playing career: 2012–present

Career history
- 2012–2013: C.S.M. Târgoviște
- 2013–2015: Spartak Moscow
- 2015–2017: Dynamo Moscow
- 2017–present: Nadezhda Orenburg

Ksenia Borisovna Tikhonenko (Russian: Ксения Борисовна Тихоненко; born 11 January 1993) is a Russian female professional basketball player for Nadezhda Orenburg and the Russian national team.

She participated at the EuroBasket Women 2017.
