= 2011 FIBA Europe Under-18 Championship for Women =

2011 FIBA U18 Women's European Championship
28th FIBA Under-18 Women's European Basketball Championship

Tournament details
- Host country: Romania
- Dates: 4–14 August 2011
- Teams: 16 (from 1 confederation)
- Venues: 2 (in 2 host cities)

Final positions
- Champions: Belgium (1st title)

Official website
- www.fibaeurope.com

The 2011 FIBA Europe Under-18 Championship for Women was the 28th edition of the FIBA Europe Under-18 Championship for Women. 16 teams featured the competition, held in Romania from 4 to 14 August 2011. Italy was the defending champion.

== Teams ==
- Belgium
- Czech Republic
- France
- Italy
- Lithuania
- Netherlands
- Poland
- Romania
- Russia
- Serbia
- Slovakia
- Slovenia
- Spain
- Sweden
- Turkey
- Ukraine

== Group stages ==
=== Preliminary round ===
In this round, the sixteen teams are allocated in four groups of four teams each. The top three qualify for the qualifying round. The last team of each group play for the 13th–16th place in the Classification Games.

Team advanced to Qualifying Round
Team competed in Classification Round

==== Group A ====
Team	Pld	W	L	PF	PA	PD	Pts	Tiebreaker
Sweden	3	3	0	227	163	+64	6	
Turkey	3	2	1	174	154	+20	5	
Romania	3	1	2	130	183	-53	4	
Russia	3	0	3	159	190	-31	3	

4 August 2011
13:30

Report

Turkey	64–66	Sweden
Scoring by quarter: 12-19, 19-14, 18-20, 15-13
Pts: Kavurmacıoğlu 15; Rebs: Kavurmacıoğlu 9 Asts: three players 2		Pts: Kurt 16; Rebs: Zahui 10; Asts: Nyström, Fontaine 4

Bihorul Sport Hall, Oradea
Attendance: 48
Referees: Ademir Zurapovic (BIH), Damir Kunosic (BIH), Roman Ponomarenko (UKR)

4 August 2011
20:15

Report

Romania	52–50	Russia
Scoring by quarter: 12–11, 9–10, 4–18, 17–11
Pts: Ursu 20; Rebs: Baluta 10; Asts: Baluta, Ursu 3		Pts: Tikhonenko 12; Rebs: Tikhonenko 10; Asts: Ryavkina, Tochilova 2

"Toni Alexe" Arena, Oradea
Attendance: 322
Referees: Jakub Zamojski (POL), Sasa Maricic (SRB), Aleksander Pavlov (MKD)

5 August 2011
15:45

Report

Russia	51–56	Turkey
Scoring by quarter: 18–20, 12–14, 11–12, 10–10
Pts: Davydova 13; Rebs: Tikhonenko 10; Asts: Ryavkina 3		Pts: Cakir 12; Rebs: Kavurmacıoğlu 7 Asts: Kalfali, Yildiz 2

"Toni Alexe" Arena, Oradea
Attendance: 150
Referees: Tomas Jasevicius (LTU), Matej Spendl (SLO), Barry Peters (NED)

5 August 2011
20:15

Report

Sweden	79–41	Romania
Scoring by quarter: 20–10, 19–8, 27–10, 13–13
Pts: Zahui 23; Rebs: Zahui 10; Asts: Nyström 5		Pts: Craciun 8 Rebs: Craciun 7 Asts: Craciun, grigore 1

Bihorul Sport Hall, Oradea
Attendance: 482
Referees: Tolga Sahin (ITA), Serghei Tislenco (MDA), Milos Koljensic (MNE)

6 August 2011
18:00

Report

Sweden	82–58	Russia
Scoring by quarter: 19–15, 15–20, 29–6, 19–17
Pts: Zahui 14; Rebs: Zahui 8 Asts: Nyström 5		Pts: Sych 11; Rebs: Davydova 10; Asts: Ryavkina, Sedletskaya 4

"Toni Alexe" Arena, Oradea
Attendance: 134
Referees: Nikola Lepetic (MNE), Jasmina Biscevic (BIH), Pavel Fuska (SVK)

6 August 2011
20:15

Report

Romania	37–54	Turkey
Scoring by quarter: 13–9, 4–13, 12–15, 8–17
Pts: Craciun 14; Rebs: Ursu 15; Asts: Ursu, Pal 2		Pts: Cakir 15; Rebs: Kavurmacıoğlu 8 Asts: Cakir, Cora, 3

"Toni Alexe" Arena, Oradea
Attendance: 669
Referees: Eddie Viator (FRA), Charalampos Karakatsounis (GRE), Benjamin Jimenez Trujillo (ESP)

==== Group B ====
Team	Pld	W	L	PF	PA	PD	Pts	Tiebreaker
Spain	3	3	0	263	121	+142	6	
Poland	3	1	2	150	192	–42	4	
Slovenia	3	1	2	147	182	–35	4	
Lithuania	3	1	2	154	219	–65	4	

4 August 2011
15:45

Report

Poland	58–61	Lithuania
Scoring by quarter: 13–12, 13–18, 15–16, 17–15
Pts: Koperwas 13; Rebs: Koperwas 6 Asts: Skrzecz, Owczarzak 4		Pts: Kazlauskaitė 13; Rebs: Preskienytė 19; Asts: Juodeikytė 8

Bihorul Sport Hall, Oradea
Attendance: 56
Referees: Charalampos Karakatsounis (GRE), Florin Grigoras (ROU), Serghei Tislenco (MDA)

4 August 2011
18:00

Report

Slovenia	42–76	Spain
Scoring by quarter: 8–18, 7–25, 14–17, 13–16
Pts: Gabrovsek 12; Rebs: Abramovic 6 Asts: Gjerkes, Gabrovsek 2		Pts: Gueye 13; Rebs: Balart 12; Asts: three players 3

Bihorul Sport Hall, Oradea
Attendance: 150
Referees: Georgios Tanatzis (GRE), Barry Peters (NED), Özlem Yalman (TUR)

5 August 2011
13:30

Report

Lithuania	51–67	Slovenia
Scoring by quarter: 15–19, 15–19, 8–13, 13–16
Pts: Prieskienytė 10; Rebs: Prieskienytė 7 Asts: four players 2		Pts: Abramovic 22; Rebs: Samec, Gabrovsek 5 Asts: Gabrovsek 4

"Toni Alexe" Arena, Oradea
Attendance: 150
Referees: Sasa Maricic (SRB), Asa Johansson (SWE), Pavel Fuska (SVK)

5 August 2011
18:00

Report

Spain	93–37	Poland
Scoring by quarter: 23–7, 24–16, 26–4, 20–10
Pts: Vilaró 22; Rebs: Zanoguera, Balart 10; Asts: Diaz, Rodriguez 4		Pts: Skrzecz, Jastrzebska 7 Rebs: Jastrzebska, Szybala 4 Asts: Skrzecz, Szybala 2

"Toni Alexe" Arena, Oradea
Attendance: 123
Referees: Eddie Viator (FRA), Jasmina Biscevic (BIH), Aleksander Pavlov (MKD)

6 August 2011
13:30

Report

Slovenia	38–55	Poland
Scoring by quarter: 6–15, 13–11, 7–11, 12–18
Pts: Abramovic 11; Rebs: Macura 10; Asts: Gabrovsek 4		Pts: Wilk 13; Rebs: Miloszewska 11; Asts: Wilk 3

"Toni Alexe" Arena, Oradea
Attendance: 147
Referees: Roman Ponomarenko (UKR), Alin Faur (ROU), Aleksander Pavlov (MKD)

6 August 2011
15:45

Report

Lithuania	42–94	Spain
Scoring by quarter: 4–26, 13–27, 13–20, 12–21
Pts: Sukyte 10; Rebs: Preskienyte 9 Asts: three players 2		Pts: Diaz 20; Rebs: Balart 9 Asts: Vilaró 5

"Toni Alexe" Arena, Oradea
Attendance: 150
Referees: Tolga Sahin (ITA), Damir Kunosic (BIH), Ilya Putenko (RUS)

==== Group C ====
Team	Pld	W	L	PF	PA	PD	Pts	Tiebreaker
Belgium	3	3	0	208	154	+54	6	
Serbia	3	2	1	166	154	+12	5	
Italy	3	1	2	170	180	-10	4	
Ukraine	3	0	3	156	212	-56	3	

4 August 2011
13:30

Report

Ukraine	60–87	Belgium
Scoring by quarter: 14-22, 13-30, 12-17, 21-18
Pts: Chek 14; Rebs: Chek 11; Asts: Kiriyenko, Sergeieva 2		Pts: Meesseman 23; Rebs: Delmulle, Bende 6 Asts: Vanloo 6

"Toni Alexe" Arena, Oradea
Attendance: 150
Referees: Nikola Lepetic (MNE), Asa Johansson (SWE), Milos Koljensic (MNE)

4 August 2011
20:15

Report

Italy	53–64	Serbia
Scoring by quarter: 8-17, 18-16, 8-16, 19-15
Pts: Reggiani 14; Rebs: Formica, C. Dotto 8 Asts: three players 1		Pts: Kovacevic 17; Rebs: Topuzovic 14; Asts: Stanacev, Bosnjak 5

"Toni Alexe" Arena, Oradea
Attendance: 180
Referees: Eddie Viator (FRA), Matej Spendl (SLO), Pavel Fuska (SVK)

5 August 2011
15:45

Report

Serbia	61–41	Ukraine
Scoring by quarter: 20-12, 17-9, 17-9, 7-11
Pts: Vuckovic 11; Rebs: Vuckovic 11; Asts: Stanacev 5		Pts: Chek 12; Rebs: Naumenko 17; Asts: Demchenko 3

Bihorul Sport Hall, Oradea
Attendance: 58
Referees: Georgios Tanatzis (GRE), Benjamin Jimenez Trujillo (ESP), Ilya Putenko (RUS)

5 August 2011
18:00

Report

Belgium	61–53	Italy
Scoring by quarter: 20-11, 9-16, 13-14, 19-12
Pts: Meesseman 17; Rebs: Meesseman 16; Asts: Meesseman 3		Pts: F. Dotto 13; Rebs: terenzi, C. Dotto 6 Asts: C. Dotto 4

Bihorul Sport Hall, Oradea
Attendance: 92
Referees: Jakub Zamojski (POL), Charalampos Karakatsounis (GRE), Alin Faur (ROU)

6 August 2011
13:30

Report

Ukraine	55–64	Italy
Scoring by quarter: 18-15, 12-22, 13-13, 12-14
Pts: Naumenko 19; Rebs: Naumenko 11; Asts: Krayevska, Demchenko 2		Pts: Formica 16; Rebs: Formica 7 Asts: Dotto 3

Bihorul Sport Hall, Oradea
Attendance: 50
Referees: Ademir Zurapovic (BIH), Florin Grigoras (ROU), Barry Peters (NED)

6 August 2011
18:00

Report

Serbia	41–60	Belgium
Scoring by quarter: 5-7, 10-16, 10-23, 16-14
Pts: Vida 9 Rebs: Topuzovic 9 Asts: Stanacev, Topuzovic 2		Pts: Vanloo 12; Rebs: Meesseman 15; Asts: Delaere 4

Bihorul Sport Hall, Oradea
Attendance: 150
Referees: Tomas Jasevicius (LTU), Serghei Tislenco (MDA), Özlem Yalman (TUR)

==== Group D ====
Team	Pld	W	L	PF	PA	PD	Pts	Tiebreaker
France	3	3	0	183	141	+42	6	
Netherlands	3	2	1	190	178	+12	5	
Czech Republic	3	1	2	195	210	–15	4	
Slovakia	3	0	3	142	181	–39	3	

4 August 2011
15:45

Report

Slovakia	32–55	France
Scoring by quarter: 3–12, 13–16, 8–14, 8–13
Pts: Slamová 10; Rebs: Raková 10; Asts: Raková 2		Pts: Galliou 10; Rebs: Angelis 9 Asts: Bernies 3

"Toni Alexe" Arena, Oradea
Attendance: 180
Referees: Tolga Sahin (ITA), Jasmina Biscevic (BIH), Ilya Putenko (RUS)

4 August 2011
18:00

Report

Czech Republic	69–81	Netherlands
Scoring by quarter: 19–17, 18–25, 23–18, 9–21
Pts: Satoranská 17; Rebs: Salacová, Samková 8 Asts: Brhelová, Satoranská 4		Pts: Bettonvil 20; Rebs: Kraaijenoord 10; Asts: Van Den Bosch, Kallenberg 4

"Toni Alexe" Arena, Oradea
Attendance: 180
Referees: Tomas Jasevicius (LTU), Alin Faur (ROU), Benjamin Jimenez Trujillo (ESP)

5 August 2011
13:30

Report

Netherlands	49–42	Slovakia
Scoring by quarter: 9–11, 16–9, 17–8, 7–14
Pts: Bettonvil, Keijl 12; Rebs: Bettonvil, Keijl 8 Asts: Adams 2		Pts: Slamová 13; Rebs: Oroszová 9 Asts: Bálintová 2

Bihorul Sport Hall, Oradea
Attendance: 24
Referees: Ademir Zurapovic (BIH), Damir Kunosic (BIH), Özlem Yalman (TUR)

5 August 2011
20:15

Report

France	61–49	Czech Republic
Scoring by quarter: 8–14, 16–19, 21–8, 16–8
Pts: Niamke 18; Rebs: Galliou 13; Asts: three players 2		Pts: Vyoralová 11; Rebs: Vojtková 8 Asts: Vyoralová 4

Bihorul Sport Hall, Oradea
Attendance: 100
Referees: Nikola Lepetic (MNE), Florin Grigoras (ROU), Roman Ponomarenko (UKR)

6 August 2011
15:45

Report

Netherlands	60–67	France
Scoring by quarter: 17–16, 3–20, 23–12, 17–19
Pts: Van Den Bosch 19; Rebs: Bettonvil 5 Asts: Kraaijenoord, Bettonvil 2		Pts: Niamke, Galliou 12; Rebs: Bernies, Mbuyamba 4 Asts: Bernies 5

Bihorul Sport Hall, Oradea
Attendance: 100
Referees: Georgios Tanatzis (GRE), Asa Johansson (SWE), Milos Koljensic (MNE)

6 August 2011
20:15

Report

Slovakia	68–77	Czech Republic
Scoring by quarter: 11–20, 20–18, 18–24, 19–15
Pts: Slamová 15; Rebs: Oroszová 19; Asts: Bálintová 3		Pts: Vyoralová 19; Rebs: Vyoralová 8 Asts: Adamcová 4

Bihorul Sport Hall, Oradea
Attendance: 120
Referees: Jakub Zamojski (POL), Sasa Maricic (SRB), Matej Spendl (SLO)

== Qualifying round ==
The twelve teams remaining will be allocated in two groups of six teams each. The four top teams advance to the quarterfinals. The last two teams of each group play for the 9th–12th place.

Team advanced to Quarterfinals
Team competed in 9th–12th playoffs

=== Group E ===
Team	Pld	W	L	PF	PA	PD	Pts	Tiebreaker
Spain	5	5	0	369	208	+161	10	
Sweden	5	4	1	331	244	+87	9	
Turkey	5	3	2	317	295	+22	8	
Poland	5	2	3	249	333	–84	7	
Slovenia	5	1	4	237	314	–77	6	
Romania	5	0	5	207	316	–109	5	

8 August 2011
15:45

Report

Slovenia	42–64	Sweden
Scoring by quarter: 8–16, 11–10, 7–25, 16–13
Pts: Gjerkes 11; Rebs: Gabrovsek 6 Asts: Gabrovsek 3		Pts: Zahui 16; Rebs: Zahui 7 Asts: Kurt 3

"Toni Alexe" Arena, Oradea
Attendance: 150
Referees: Eddie Viator (FRA), Serghei Tislenco (MDA), Ilya Putenko (RUS)

8 August 2011
18:00

Report

Poland	65–76 (OT)	Turkey
Scoring by quarter: 17–14, 14–21, 17–10, 15–18, Overtime: 2–13
Pts: Miloszewska 19; Rebs: Miloszewska 8 Asts: Koperwas 3		Pts: Kavurmacıoğlu 22; Rebs: Kavurmacıoğlu 11; Asts: Cakir 6

"Toni Alexe" Arena, Oradea
Attendance: 72
Referees: Sasa Maricic (SRB), Damir Kunosic (BIH), Jasmina Biscevic (BIH)

8 August 2011
20:15

Report

Romania	25–73	Spain
Scoring by quarter: 5–13, 8–21, 7–17, 5–22
Pts: Ursu 10; Rebs: Ursu 9 Asts: Baluta 2		Pts: Ndour 13; Rebs: Ndour 12; Asts: Zanoguera 3

"Toni Alexe" Arena, Oradea
Attendance: 652
Referees: Ademir Zurapovic (BIH), Barry Peters (NED), Özlem Yalman (TUR)

9 August 2011
13:30

Report

Sweden	75–39	Poland
Scoring by quarter: 17–9, 23–12, 17–11, 18–7
Pts: Vesterberg 21; Rebs: Zahui 8 Asts: four players 3		Pts: Wojdalska 10; Rebs: Jastrzebska 12; Asts: Skrzecz, Wojdalska 2

University Gym, Oradea
Attendance: 50
Referees: Tolga Sahin (ITA), Tomas Jasevicius (LTU), Aleksander Pavlov (MKD)

9 August 2011
18:00

Report

Turkey	57–69	Spain
Scoring by quarter: 15–21, 13–23, 11–8, 18–17
Pts: Cora 19; Rebs: Cakir 9 Asts: Cora, Cakir 2		Pts: Ndour 18; Rebs: Ndour 11; Asts: Zanoguera 4

University Gym, Oradea
Attendance: 200
Referees: Roman Ponomarenko (UKR), Ilya Putenko (RUS), Pavel Fuska (SVK)

9 August 2011
20:15

Report

Slovenia	57–53	Romania
Scoring by quarter: 14–16, 23–15, 8–10, 12–12
Pts: Abramovic 15; Rebs: Gabrovsek, Gjerkes 9 Asts: Abramovic 2		Pts: Ursu 18; Rebs: Baluta 13; Asts: Ursu 3

University Gym, Oradea
Attendance: 200
Referees: Georgios Tanatzis (GRE), Damir Kunosic (BIH), Jasmina Biscevic (BIH)

10 August 2011
13:30

Report

Turkey	66–58	Slovenia
Scoring by quarter: 14–15, 20–13, 16–13, 16–17
Pts: Kavurmacıoğlu 17; Rebs: Kavurmacıoğlu 14; Asts: Cakir 4		Pts: Gjerkes 16; Rebs: Macura 9 Asts: Gjerkes, Abramovic 1

"Toni Alexe" Arena, Oradea
Attendance: 150
Referees: Sasa Maricic (SRB), Tomas Jasevicius (LTU), Aleksander Pavlov (MKD)

10 August 2011
18:00

Report

Spain	58–47	Sweden
Scoring by quarter: 16–7, 10–12, 17–19, 15–9
Pts: De Alfredo, Balart 13; Rebs: Ndour, Balart 8 Asts: Llobet 3		Pts: Zahui 14; Rebs: Zahui 10; Asts: Fontaine 3

"Toni Alexe" Arena, Oradea
Attendance: 247
Referees: Eddie Viator (FRA), Roman Ponomarenko (UKR), Barry Peters (NED)

10 August 2011
20:15

Report

Poland	53–51	Romania
Scoring by quarter: 9–17, 16–13, 24–12, 4–9
Pts: Szybala 11; Rebs: Miloszewska 11; Asts: Wojdalska 2		Pts: Pal 17; Rebs: Grigore 10; Asts: Pal 3

"Toni Alexe" Arena, Oradea
Attendance: 670
Referees: Nikola Lepetic (MNE), Charalampos Karakatsounis (GRE), Serghei Tislenco (MDA)

=== Group F ===
Team	Pld	W	L	PF	PA	PD	Pts	Tiebreaker
France	5	5	0	317	248	+69	10	
Belgium	5	4	1	315	284	+31	9	
Serbia	5	3	2	305	319	–14	8	
Netherlands	5	2	3	301	315	–14	7	
Czech Republic	5	1	4	321	353	–32	6	
Italy	5	0	5	241	281	–40	5	

8 August 2011
15:45

Report

Czech Republic	68–75	Belgium
Scoring by quarter: 14–26, 17–14, 13–18, 24–17
Pts: Satoranská, Brhelová 12; Rebs: Selucká 7 Asts: Vyoralová 3		Pts: Delaere 21; Rebs: Meesseman 12; Asts: Vanloo 8

University Gym, Oradea
Attendance: 100
Referees: Nikola Lepetic (MNE), Benjamin Jimenez Trujillo (ESP), Aleksander Pavlov (MKD)

8 August 2011
18:00

Report

Netherlands	51–60	Serbia
Scoring by quarter: 13–11, 17–11, 8–17, 13–21
Pts: Treffers 14; Rebs: Bettonvil 9 Asts: Van Den Bosch 3		Pts: Kovacevic 21; Rebs: Kovacevic 10; Asts: Stanacev 7

University Gym, Oradea
Attendance: 90
Referees: Tolga Sahin (ITA), Florin Grigoras (ROU), Roman Ponomarenko (UKR)

8 August 2011
20:15

Report

Italy	40–47	France
Scoring by quarter: 3–14, 13–8, 9–12, 15–13
Pts: Ravelli 12; Rebs: Nori 6 Asts: Terenzi 2		Pts: Bernies 11; Rebs: Galliou 12; Asts: Bernies, De Angelis 2

University Gym, Oradea
Attendance: 100
Referees: Tomas Jasevicius (LTU), Asa Johansson (SWE), Pavel Fuska (SVK)

9 August 2011
13:30

Report

Belgium	71–54	Netherlands
Scoring by quarter: 19–16, 16–9, 25–7, 11–22
Pts: Vanloo 14; Rebs: Meesseman, Bende 6 Asts: Vanloo 4		Pts: Essenstam 14; Rebs: Essenstam 10; Asts: Van Den Bosch, Kallenberg 3

"Toni Alexe" Arena, Oradea
Attendance: 140
Referees: Ademir Zurapovic (BIH), Charalampos Karakatsounis (GRE), Matej Spendl (SLO)

9 August 2011
18:00

Report

Czech Republic	54–47	Italy
Scoring by quarter: 14–11, 6–17, 21–8, 13–11
Pts: Vyoralová 19; Rebs: Vyoralová14; Asts: four players 2		Pts: Masoni 11; Rebs: Formica, Nori 6 Asts: Reggiani, Dotto 2

"Toni Alexe" Arena, Oradea
Attendance: 150
Referees: Florin Grigoras (ROU), Alin Faur (ROU), Özlem Yalman (TUR)

9 August 2011
20:15

Report

Serbia	51–74	France
Scoring by quarter: 15–16, 13–17, 11–19, 12–22
Pts: Stanacev 13; Rebs: Toskovic, Vuckovic 4 Asts: Stanacev 3		Pts: Nayo 15; Rebs: Stievenard, Galliou 9 Asts: Epoupa 3

"Toni Alexe" Arena, Oradea
Attendance: 269
Referees: Jakub Zamojski (POL), Serghei Tislenco (MDA), Milos Koljensic (MNE)

10 August 2011
13:30

Report

Netherlands	55–48	Italy
Scoring by quarter: 6–8, 18–12, 14–10, 17–18
Pts: Treffers 17; Rebs: van der Keijl 11; Asts: Kallenberg 6		Pts: Formica, Masoni 10; Rebs: Masoni 8 Asts: Dotto 4

University Gym, Oradea
Attendance: 50
Referees: Damir Kunosic (BIH), Alin Faur (ROU), Benjamin Jimenez Trujillo (ESP)

10 August 2011
18:00

Report

France	68–48	Belgium
Scoring by quarter: 20–6, 18–19, 21–11, 9–12
Pts: Nayo 10; Rebs: three players 5 Asts: Bernies 3		Pts: Vanloo 25; Rebs: Meesseman 8 Asts: Vanloo 3

University Gym, Oradea
Attendance: 80
Referees: Ademir Zurapovic (BIH), Asa Johansson (SWE), Pavel Fuska (SVK)

10 August 2011
20:15

Report

Serbia	89–81	Czech Republic
Scoring by quarter: 22–20, 17–23, 22–21, 28–17
Pts: Kovacevic 25; Rebs: Brajkovic 14; Asts: Stanacev 8		Pts: Salacová 23; Rebs: Satoranská 6 Asts: Vyoralová 4

University Gym, Oradea
Attendance: 100
Referees: Georgios Tanatzis (GRE), Ilya Putenko (RUS), Milos Koljensic (MNE)

== Classification round ==
The last teams of each group in the preliminary round will compete in this Classification Round. The four teams will play in one group. The last two teams will be relegated to Division B for the next season.

Team will be relegated to Division B.

=== Group G ===
Team	Pld	W	L	PF	PA	PD	Pts	Tiebreaker
Russia	6	5	1	456	321	+135	11	1–1 +14
Slovakia	6	5	1	384	329	+55	11	1–1 –14
Ukraine	6	1	5	325	417	–92	7	1–1 +13
Lithuania	6	1	5	300	398	–98	7	1–1 –13

8 August 2011
13:30

Report

Lithuania	41–59	Ukraine
Scoring by quarter: 12–15, 9–14, 8–15, 12–15
Pts: Juodeikyte 9 Rebs: Preskienyte 9 Asts: Juodeikyte 4		Pts: Uro-Nile 12; Rebs: Chek 12; Asts: Krayevska 6

University Gym, Oradea
Attendance: 50
Referees: Jakub Zamojski (POL), Charalampos Karakatsounis (GRE), Milos Koljensic (MNE)

8 August 2011
13:30

Report

Russia	56–64	Slovakia
Scoring by quarter: 13–19, 17–16, 7–12, 19–17
Pts: Davydova 17; Rebs: Razheva 9 Asts: Zamaraeva 3		Pts: Oroszová 16; Rebs: Oroszová 11; Asts: Slamová 6

"Toni Alexe" Arena, Oradea
Attendance: 150
Referees: Georgios Tanatzis (GRE), Matej Spendl (SLO), Alin Faur (ROU)

9 August 2011
15:45

Report

Slovakia	71–42	Lithuania
Scoring by quarter: 17–15, 22–7, 12–6, 20–14
Pts: Oroszová, Slamová 17; Rebs: Oroszová 7 Asts: Slamová 7		Pts: Tamasauskaite 10; Rebs: Zilinskaite 12; Asts: Zilinskaite 3

"Toni Alexe" Arena, Oradea
Attendance: 160
Referees: Nikola Lepetic (MNE), Sasa Maricic (SRB), Benjamin Jimenez Trujillo (ESP)

9 August 2011
15:45

Report

Ukraine	46–75	Russia
Scoring by quarter: 15–21, 6–19, 11–18, 14–17
Pts: Naumenko 12; Rebs: Kiriyenko 6 Asts: Kiriyenko 2		Pts: Razheva 13; Rebs: Davydova 9 Asts: five players 2

University Gym, Oradea
Attendance: 50
Referees: Eddie Viator (FRA), Asa Johansson (SWE), Barry Peters (NED)

10 August 2011
15:45

Report

Ukraine	54–65	Slovakia
Scoring by quarter: 10–15, 13–21, 18–21, 13–8
Pts: Chek 17; Rebs: Uro-Nile 10; Asts: Naumenko, Krayevska 1		Pts: Oroszová 16; Rebs: Bálintová 10; Asts: Slamová 5

University Gym, Oradea
Attendance: 50
Referees: Tolga Sahin (ITA), Matej Spendl (SLO), Özlem Yalman (TUR)

10 August 2011
15:45

Report

Russia	83–51	Lithuania
Scoring by quarter: 25–10, 18–6, 12–15, 28–20
Pts: Kiseleva 19; Rebs: Tikhonenko 7 Asts: Zamaraeva 4		Pts: Jasiunskaite, Aleksaite 9 Rebs: Preskienyte 10; Asts: Jasiunskaite, Aleksaite 2

"Toni Alexe" Arena, Oradea
Attendance: 140
Referees: Jakub Zamojski (POL), Florin Grigoras (ROU), Jasmina Biscevic (BIH)

12 August 2011
13:30

Report

Ukraine	63–68	Lithuania
Scoring by quarter: 17–15, 7–24, 19–16, 20–13
Pts: Naumenko 19; Rebs: Chek 8 Asts: Krayevska 6		Pts: Kazlauskaite 17; Rebs: Preskienyte 8 Asts: Kazlauskaite 5

"Toni Alexe" Arena, Oradea
Attendance: 92
Referees: Tolga Sahin (ITA), Nikola Lepetic (MNE), Asa Johansson (SWE)

12 August 2011
20:15

Report

Slovakia	57–79	Russia
Scoring by quarter: 24–19, 18–20, 7–20, 8–20
Pts: Bálintová 17; Rebs: Slezáriková 7 Asts: Slamová 3		Pts: Tikhonenko 24; Rebs: Tikhonenko 13; Asts: Kiseleva 5

"Toni Alexe" Arena, Oradea
Attendance: 56
Referees: Charalampos Karakatsounis (GRE), Benjamin Jimenez Trujillo (ESP), Milos Koljensic (MNE)

13 August 2011
15:45

Report

Lithuania	46–65	Slovakia
Scoring by quarter: 12–17, 13–18, 7–11, 14–19
Pts: Preskienyte 13; Rebs: Preskienyte 11; Asts: Sukyte 2		Pts: Slamová 19; Rebs: Oroszová 9 Asts: Slezáriková 4

University Gym, Oradea
Attendance: 100
Referees: Damir Kunosic (BIH), Aleksander Pavlov (MKD), Özlem Yalman (TUR)

13 August 2011
15:45

Report

Russia	106–51	Ukraine
Scoring by quarter: 31–13, 23–8, 33–11, 19–19
Pts: Zamaraeva 20; Rebs: Davydova 11; Asts: Kiseleva 9		Pts: Chek 22; Rebs: Chek 8 Asts: Chek, Demchenko 2

"Toni Alexe" Arena, Oradea
Attendance: 100
Referees: Jasmina Biscevic (BIH), Serghei Tislenco (MDA), Barry Peters (NED)

14 August 2011
10:45

Report

Lithuania	52–57	Russia
Scoring by quarter: 13–20, 15–8, 14–16, 10–13
Pts: Preskienyte, Juodeikyte 11; Rebs: Preskienyte 10; Asts: Kazlauskaite 4		Pts: Davydova 15; Rebs: Davydova, Khmeleva 5 Asts: four players 3

University Gym, Oradea
Attendance: 50
Referees: Barry Peters (NED), Pavel Fuska (SVK), Milos Koljensic (MNE)

14 August 2011
13:30

Report

Slovakia	62–52	Ukraine
Scoring by quarter: 17–6, 19–23, 14–8, 12–15
Pts: Bálintová 19; Rebs: Draganovská 10; Asts: Slamová 5		Pts: Chek 8 Rebs: Krayevska 11; Asts: Krayevska 6

"Toni Alexe" Arena, Oradea
Attendance: 50
Referees: Charalampos Karakatsounis (GRE), Alin Faur (ROU), Benjamin Jimenez Trujillo (ESP)

== Knockout round ==
=== Championship ===
Quarter-finals
August 12 – Oradea
Spain	88
Netherlands	50
August 12 – Oradea
Belgium	60
Turkey	58
August 12 – Oradea
France	81
Poland	54
August 12 – Oradea
Sweden	66
Serbia	65

Semi-finals
August 13 – Oradea
Spain	63
Belgium	65
August 13 – Oradea
France	80
Sweden	37

Final
August 14 – Oradea
Belgium	77
France	49
Third place
August 14 – Oradea
Spain	85
Sweden	69

=== 5th–8th playoffs ===
Semi-finals
August 13 – Oradea
Netherlands	81
Turkey	73
August 13 – Oradea
Poland	63
Serbia	61

Fifth place
August 14 – Oradea
Netherlands	80
Poland	62
Seventh place
August 14 – Oradea
Turkey	47
Serbia	42

=== 9th–12th playoffs ===
Semi-finals
August 12 – Oradea
Slovenia	57
Italy	62
August 12 – Oradea
Czech Republic	75
Romania	71

Ninth place
August 14 – Oradea
Italy	54
Czech Republic	59
Eleventh place
August 14 – Oradea
Slovenia	50
Romania	47

==== Quarterfinals ====
12 August 2011
13:30

Report

Spain	88–50	Netherlands
Scoring by quarter: 22–11, 22–12, 26–9, 18–18
Pts: Rodriguez, Ndour 13; Rebs: Balart 7 Asts: Diaz, Vilaró 5		Pts: Bettonvil 12; Rebs: Bettonvil 5 Asts: Van Den Bosch 3

Bihorul Sport Hall, Oradea
Attendance: 143
Referees: Jakub Zamojski (POL), Özlem Yalman (TUR), Aleksander Pavlov (MKD)

12 August 2011
15:45

Report

France	81–54	Poland
Scoring by quarter: 29–16, 20–13, 20–13, 12–12
Pts: Diallo, Cornelie 14; Rebs: Diallo 9 Asts: Diallo, Niamke 3		Pts: Owczarzak 14; Rebs: Jaworska 6 Asts: Wozniak 2

Bihorul Sport Hall, Oradea
Attendance: 123
Referees: Sasa Maricic (SRB), Alin Faur (ROU), Barry Peters (NED)

12 August 2011
18:00

Report

Sweden	66–65	Serbia
Scoring by quarter: 16–28, 11–10, 20–10, 19–17
Pts: Zahui 24; Rebs: Zahui 12; Asts: Nyström 4		Pts: Kovacevic 21; Rebs: Kovacevic, Stanacev 8 Asts: Stanacev 4

Bihorul Sport Hall, Oradea
Attendance: 123
Referees: Tomas Jasevicius (LTU), Florin Grigoras (ROU), Serghei Tislenco (MDA)

12 August 2011
20:15

Report

Belgium	60–58	Turkey
Scoring by quarter: 19–12, 13–15, 7–17, 21–14
Pts: Meesseman 24; Rebs: Meesseman 14; Asts: Vanloo 4		Pts: Cora 20; Rebs: Cakir 10; Asts: five players 1

Bihorul Sport Hall, Oradea
Attendance: 150
Referees: Georgios Tanatzis (GRE), Matej Spendl (SLO), Jasmina Biscevic (BIH)

==== 9th–12th semifinals ====
12 August 2011
15:45

Report

Slovenia	57–62	Italy
Scoring by quarter: 18-18, 10-20, 12-17, 17-7
Pts: Abramovic 17; Rebs: Macura 10; Asts: Zupancic 3		Pts: Formica, C. Dotto 10; Rebs: Formica, C. Dotto 6 Asts: C. Dotto 6

"Toni Alexe" Arena, Oradea
Attendance: 45
Referees: Eddie Viator (FRA), Damir Kunosic (BIH), Ilya Putenko (RUS)

12 August 2011
18:00

Report

Czech Republic	75–71 (OT)	Romania
Scoring by quarter: 21-15, 17-19, 16-14, 8-14, Overtime: 13-9
Pts: Vojtková 17; Rebs: Vojtková 10; Asts: Vojtková 5		Pts: Ursu 25; Rebs: Ursu 14; Asts: Dumitrache 3

"Toni Alexe" Arena, Oradea
Attendance: 300
Referees: Ademir Zurapovic (BIH), Roman Ponomarenko (UKR), Pavel Fuska (SVK)

==== 5th–8th semifinals ====
13 August 2011
18:00

Report

Netherlands	81–73	Turkey
Scoring by quarter: 15-27, 19-16, 26-19, 21-11
Pts: Bettonvil 19; Rebs: Bettonvil 12; Asts: Adams 6		Pts: Kavurmacıoğlu 16; Rebs: Kavurmacıoğlu 7 Asts: Cora, Tokmak 2

Bihorul Sport Hall, Oradea
Attendance: 45
Referees: Roman Ponomarenko (UKR), Asa Johansson (SWE), Milos Koljensic (MNE)

13 August 2011
20:15

Report

Poland	63–61	Serbia
Scoring by quarter: 20-17, 7-10, 19-13, 17-21
Pts: Miloszewska 12; Rebs: Owczarzak 8 Asts: Owczarzak, Wilk 3		Pts: Brajkovic 12; Rebs: Brajkovic 15; Asts: Vidakovic 3

Bihorul Sport Hall, Oradea
Attendance: 120
Referees: Georgios Tanatzis (GRE), Ilya Putenko (RUS), Pavel Fuska (SVK)

==== Semifinals ====
13 August 2011
18:00

Report

France	80–37	Sweden
Scoring by quarter: 28–5, 26–12, 14–9, 12–11
Pts: Bernies 17; Rebs: Bernies, Galliou 6 Asts: Diallo 3		Pts: Vesterberg 11; Rebs: Zahui 4 Asts: Nyström 2

"Toni Alexe" Arena, Oradea
Attendance: 123
Referees: Jakub Zamojski (POL), Charalampos Karakatsounis (GRE), Benjamin Jimenez Trujillo (ESP)

13 August 2011
20:15

Report

Spain	63–65	Belgium
Scoring by quarter: 19–12, 20–25, 15–9, 9–19
Pts: Ndour 22; Rebs: Ndour 10; Asts: Balart, Zanoguera 5		Pts: Vanloo, Meesseman 21; Rebs: Meesseman 8 Asts: Vanloo, Delmulle 3

"Toni Alexe" Arena, Oradea
Attendance: 672
Referees: Eddie Viator (FRA), Ademir Zurapovic (BIH), Alin Faur (ROU)

==== 11th place playoff ====
14 August 2011
12:45

Report

Slovenia	50–47	Romania
Scoring by quarter: 11–12, 10–14, 11–13, 18–8
Pts: Abramovic 17; Rebs: Abramovic 13; Asts: Abramovic, Zupancic 5		Pts: Ursu 20; Rebs: Ursu, Baluta 9 Asts: Ursu 4

Palazzeto Quartu S. Elena, Cagliari
Attendance: 50
Referees: Nikola Lepetic (MNE), Milos Koljensic (MNE), Aleksander Pavlov (MKD)

==== 9th place playoff ====
14 August 2011
14:45

Report

Italy	54–59	Czech Republic
Scoring by quarter: 17–14, 7–13, 14–14, 16–18
Pts: Nori 12; Rebs: Terenzi 9 Asts: Melchiori 4		Pts: Satoranská 15; Rebs: Satoranská 13; Asts: Vojtková, Brhelová 3

Palazzeto Quartu S. Elena, Cagliari
Attendance: 130
Referees: Asa Johansson (SWE), Jasmina Biscevic (BIH), Özlem Yalman (TUR)

==== 7th place playoff ====
14 August 2011
16:45

Report

Turkey	47–42	Serbia
Scoring by quarter: 7-9, 13-12, 7-12, 20-9
Pts: Cora 12; Rebs: Sezer 13; Asts: four players 1		Pts: Kovacevic, Toskovic 11; Rebs: Brajkovic 13; Asts: Vidakovic 2

"Toni Alexe" Arena, Oradea
Attendance: 79
Referees: Eddie Viator (FRA), Jakub Zamojski (POL), Ilya Putenko (RUS)

==== 5th place playoff ====
14 August 2011
15:30

Report

Netherlands	80–62	Poland
Scoring by quarter: 19-16, 13-16, 20-9, 28-21
Pts: van der Keijl 18; Rebs: Bettonvil 12; Asts: Van Den Bosch 6		Pts: Miloszewska, Wilk 11; Rebs: three players 4 Asts: Owczarzak, Wojdalska 3

"Toni Alexe" Arena, Oradea
Attendance: 123
Referees: Ademir Zurapovic (BIH), Matej Spendl (SLO), Serghei Tislenco (MDA)

==== Bronze medal game ====
14 August 2011
19:00

Report

Spain	85–69	Sweden
Scoring by quarter: 20-19, 22-16, 17-15, 26-19
Pts: Diaz 20; Rebs: Ndour 9 Asts: Diaz 5		Pts: Zahui 22; Rebs: Asoro 11; Asts: Kurt 3

"Toni Alexe" Arena, Oradea
Attendance: 546
Referees: Damir Kunosic (BIH), Sasa Maricic (SRB), Roman Ponomarenko (UKR)

==== Final ====
14 August 2011
21:15

Report

Belgium	77–49	France
Scoring by quarter: 18-18, 21-9, 23-5, 15-17
Pts: Meesseman 25; Rebs: Meesseman 9 Asts: Devliegher 4		Pts: Cornelie, Galliou 7 Rebs: Galliou 8 Asts: Bernies, Epoupa 3

"Toni Alexe" Arena, Oradea
Attendance: 1589
Referees: Tolga Sahin (ITA), Georgios Tanatzis (GRE), Florin Grigoras (ROU)

== Awards ==
2011 FIBA Europe Under-20 Championship for Women winner

Belgium
First title

== Final standings ==
Rank	Team	Record
Gold medal	Belgium	8–1
Silver medal	France	8–1
Bronze medal	Spain	8–1
4th	Sweden	6–3
5th	Netherlands	5–3
6th	Poland	3–5
7th	Turkey	5–3
8th	Serbia	4–4
9th	Czech Republic	4–4
10th	Italy	2–6
11th	Slovenia	3–5
12th	Romania	1–7
13th	Russia	5–4
14th	Slovakia	5–4
15th	Ukraine	1–8
16th	Lithuania	2–7
