= Lycée René Cassin =

Lycée René Cassin may refer to:

Schools in France:

- Lycée René Cassin in Arpajon
- Lycée René Cassin in Bayonne
- Lycée René Cassin in Gonesse
- Lycée René Cassin in Le Raincy
- Lycée René Cassin in Mâcon
- Lycée René Cassin in Metz
- Lycée René Cassin in Montfort-sur-Meu
- Lycée René Cassin in Noisiel
- Lycée René Cassin in Strasbourg

Schools outside of France:

- Lycée Français René Cassin d'Oslo
