= Julie Vanloo =

Belgian basketball player (born 1993)

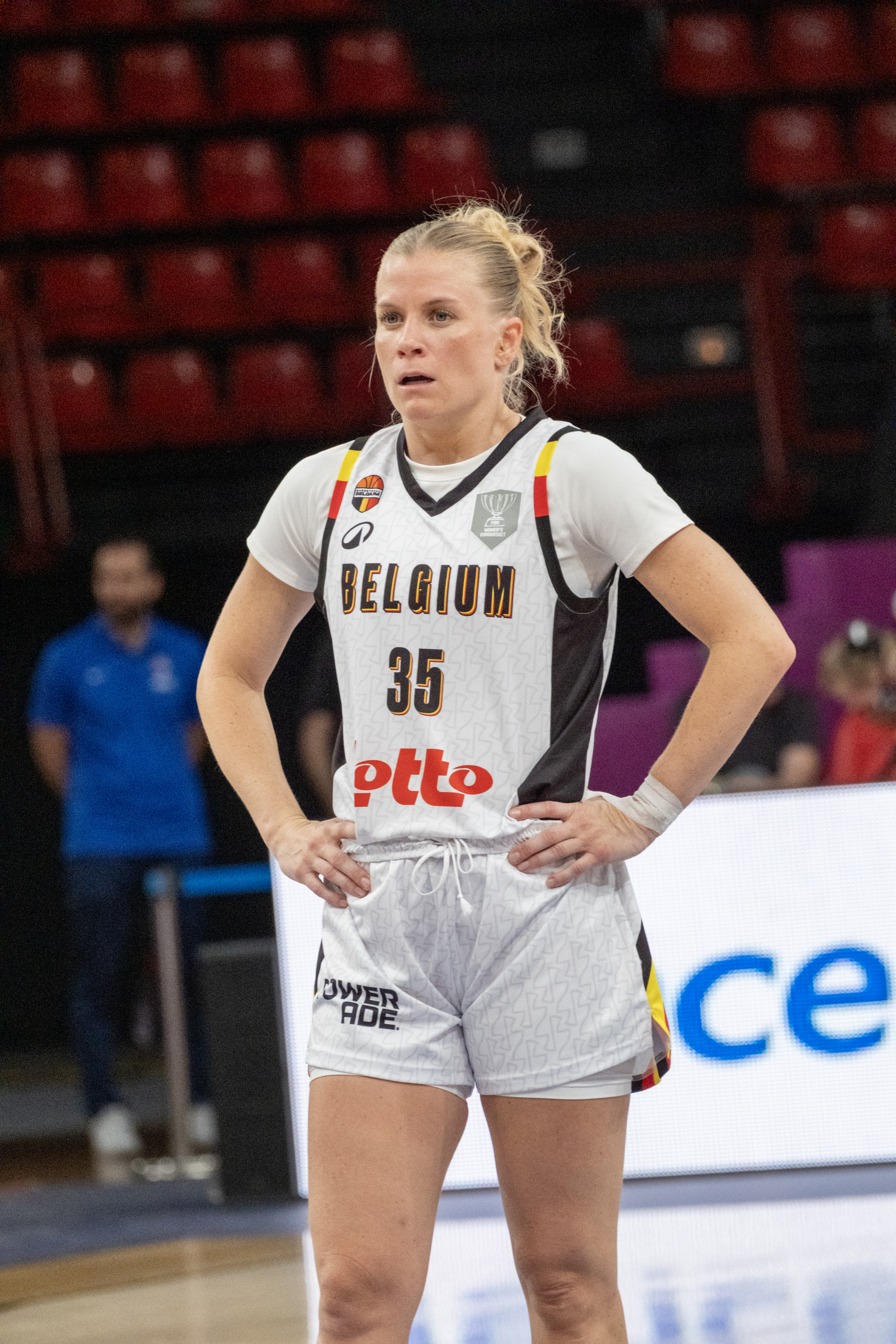
- Vanloo with Belgium during 2025 EuroBasket

No. 35 – Athinaikos
- Position: Point guard
- League: Greek Basketball League; EuroLeague Women

Personal information
- Born: 10 February 1993 (age 33) Ostend, Belgium
- Listed height: 5 ft 8 in (1.73 m)

Career information
- Playing career: 2003–present

Career history
- 2003–2009: Blue Cats Ieper
- 2009–2013: Declercq Stortbeton Waregem BC
- 2013–2015: USO Mondeville
- 2015–2016: Luleå Basket
- 2016–2017: Virtus Eirene Ragusa
- 2017–2018: İstanbul Üniversitesi
- 2018: ASVEL Féminin
- 2018–2019: PEAC Pecs
- 2019–2020: Townsville Fire
- 2020–2021: Casademont Zaragoza
- 2021–2022: ŽBK Jenisej Krasnojarsk
- 2022–2023: BLMA
- 2023–2025: Galatasaray
- 2024: Washington Mystics
- 2025: Golden State Valkyries
- 2025: Los Angeles Sparks
- 2025–2026: ÇBK Mersin
- 2026: New York Liberty
- 2026–present: Athinaikos

Career highlights
- EuroCup champion (2026); EuroBasket U18 Women champion (2011); Belgian National League champion (2011); Swedish National League champion (2016); 2× FIBA EuroBasket champion (2023, 2025)
- Stats at WNBA.com
- Stats at Basketball Reference

Julie Anita Vanloo (born 10 February 1993) is a Belgian professional basketball player for Athinaikos of the Greek Basketball League.

With the Belgian national team, she won the EuroBasket Women 2023 and 2025.

== Professional career ==
=== Europe ===
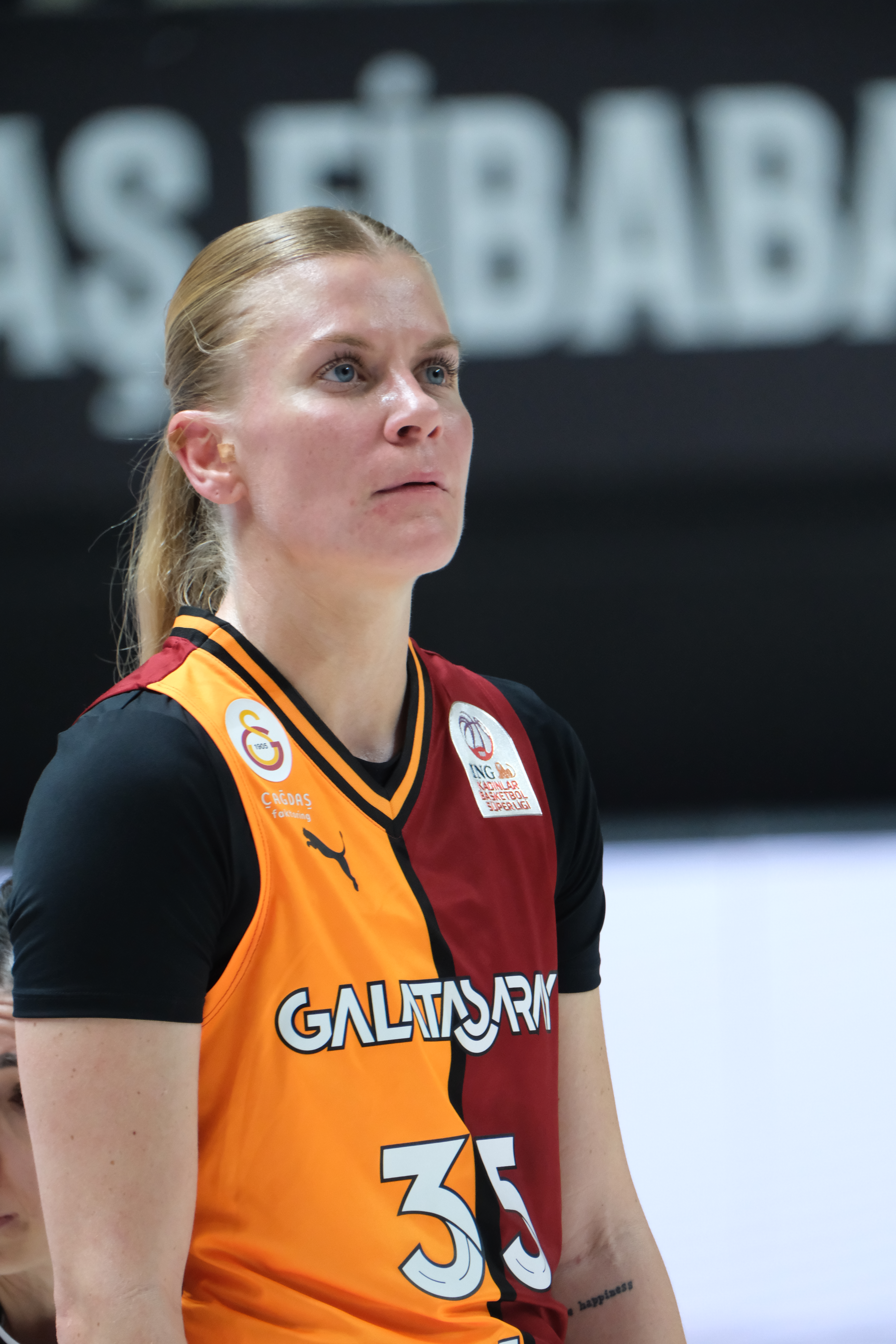
Vanloo with the Galatasaray in 2025

On 13 September 2023, she signed with Galatasaray of the Turkish Women's Basketball Super League (TKBL). She signed a new 1-year contract with Galatasaray on 21 July 2024. Galatasaray club said goodbye to the player on May 28, 2025, by publishing a thank you message.

She signed with Çukurova Basketbol for the 2025–26 season.

=== WNBA ===
==== Washington Mystics (2024) ====
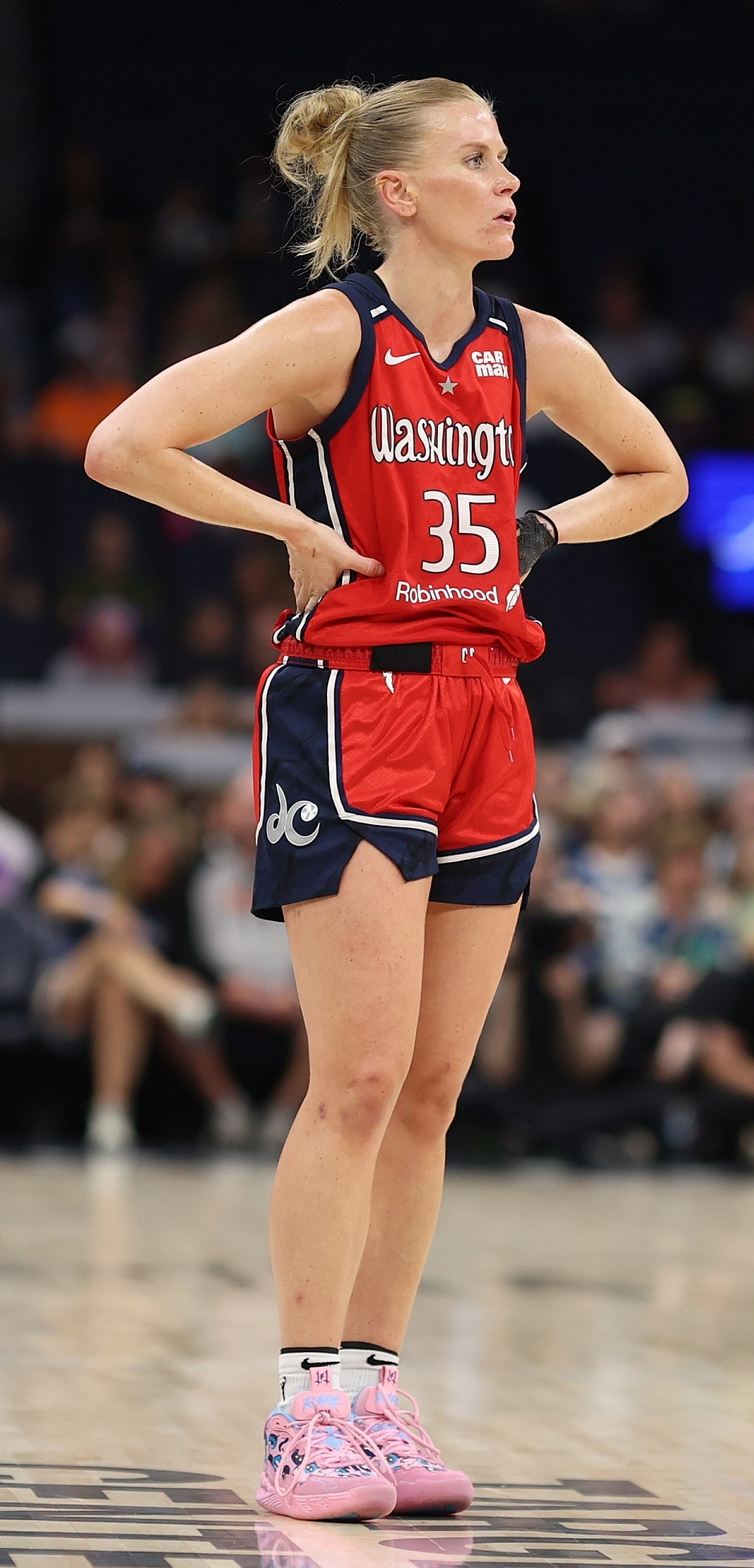
Vanloo with the Washington Mystics in 2024

In 2024, Vanloo entered the Women's National Basketball Association (WNBA) with the Washington Mystics at the age of 31.

==== Golden State Valkyries (2025) ====
On 6 December 2024, Vanloo was selected as the Golden State Valkyries' pick from the Washington Mystics' roster in the 2024 WNBA expansion draft.

After winning the European Championship with Belgium in 2025, Vanloo flew directly from Athens to San Francisco, missing the inauguration in the Royal Palace of Brussels and festivities for the national team the next day. Upon arrival in the United States after an 18-hour flight, she learned online that her contract had been waived.

==== Los Angeles Sparks (2025) ====
On 3 July, 2025, Vanloo was signed by the Los Angeles Sparks.

Towards the end of the 2025 regular season, Vanloo was featured — along with Diamond DeShields, Haley Jones, Harmoni Turner, and Shyanne Sellers — in an ESPN article on life on the WNBA fringe given the league's limit of only 12 roster spots per team.

==== New York Liberty (2026–present) ====
On 8 May, 2026, Vanloo was signed by the New York Liberty on a hardship contract.

On 22 May, 2026, Vanloo was waived by the New York Liberty

== National team career ==
She plays for the Belgian national team and participated at EuroBasket Women 2017, the 2020 and 2024 Summer Olympics, EuroBasket Women 2021, EuroBasket Women 2023, and EuroBasket Women 2025

== Career statistics ==
Legend
GP	Games played	GS	Games started	MPG	Minutes per game	RPG	Rebounds per game
APG	Assists per game	SPG	Steals per game	BPG	Blocks per game	PPG	Points per game
TO	Turnovers per game	FG%	Field-goal percentage	3P%	3-point field-goal percentage	FT%	Free-throw percentage
**Bold**	Career best	°	League leader

=== WNBA ===
Stats current through end of 2025 season

WNBA regular season statistics
Year	Team	GP	GS	MPG	FG%	3P%	FT%	RPG	APG	SPG	BPG	TO	PPG
2024	Washington	**40**	**34**	**23.2**	**.346**	**.324**	.667	1.6	**4.3**	0.5	0.0	2.6	**7.4**
2025	Golden State	9	2	20.0	.292	.211	**.833**	**1.9**	4.1	**0.7**	0.0	2.6	4.6
2025	Los Angeles	26	0	10.3	.302	.315	.750	0.6	1.2	0.3	0.0	**1.0**	2.2
**Career**	3 years, 3 teams	75	36	18.3	.333	.309	.720	1.3	3.2	0.5	0.0	2.0	5.2

== Honours ==
=== Declercq Stortbeton Waregem BC ===
- Belgian Basketball League: 2010–11

=== Luleå Basket ===
- Basketligan dam: 2015–16

=== ÇBK Mersin ===
- EuroCup: 2025–26

=== National team ===
- 2nd place U16 World Cup: 2010
- 4th place U17 World Cup: 2011
- Winner U18 European Championship (gold) : 2011
- Winner Europe U20 Championship Division B (gold) : 2013
- 3rd place European Championship (bronze) : 2017
- 3rd place European Championship (bronze) : 2021
- 1st place European Championship (gold) : 2023
- Belgian Sports team of the Year: 2020, 2023, 2025
- 1st place European Championship (gold) : 2025

=== Individual ===
- All-Star Five U18 European Championship: 2011
- MVP / Most points per game Europe U20 Championship Division B: 2013
- All-Star Five European Championship: 2023
- All-Second Team Olympics Woman's Basketball Tournament: Paris 2024
- All-Second Team European Championship: 2025
