= Ernest Broquet =

- Born: March 17, 1851; Saint-Mards-en-Othe
- Died: November 27, 1928; Gonesse, France

Ernest Broquet in the operating room (pictured in the center in the hat and glasses)

Ernest Broquet (March 17, 1851 – November 27, 1928) was born on March 17, 1851, in the town of Saint-Mards-en-Othe, France. He was a medical doctor and author. He served with the French territorial army. He received the Chevaliers order of the Legion of Honor at the Palace of Versailles on September 10, 1904. He later moved to Gonesse, France, where he was elected mayor in 1925 and served in that role until his death in 1928.

== Works ==
=== Non-fiction ===
- Étude médico-légale sur les conditions de l'état mental nécessaires pour tester (1879)
- Consultation médico-légale sur l'état mental de M. Pierre Filliol (1879)
- Leçons sur un cas de cardiopathie (coeur forcé), avec hémiplégie (1889)
