= Hôtel de Ville, Gonesse =

Town hall in Gonesse, France

Hôtel de Ville
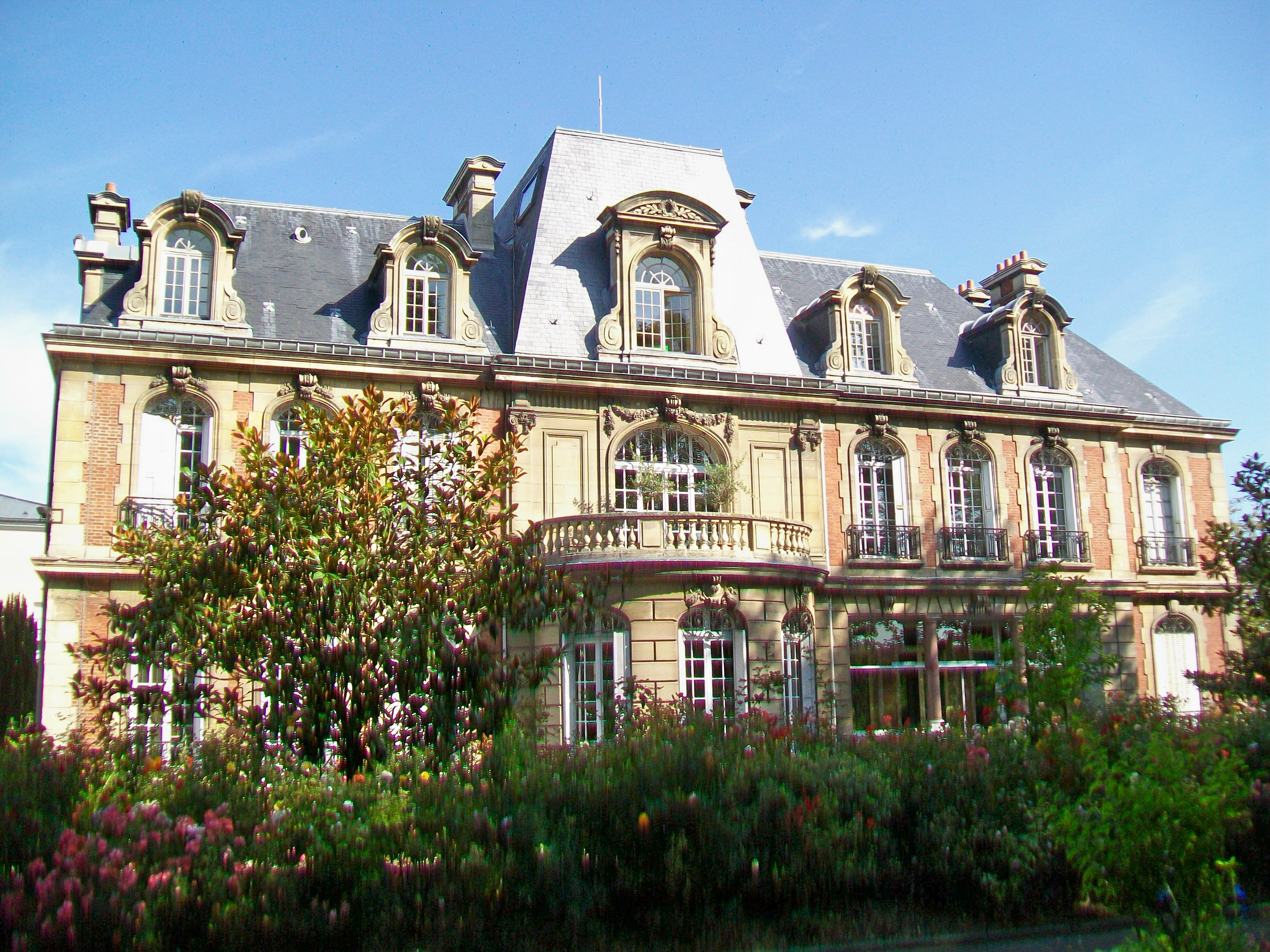
- The main frontage of the Hôtel de Ville in August 2011
- Interactive map of the Hôtel de Ville area

General information
- Type: City hall
- Architectural style: Neoclassical style
- Location: Gonesse, France
- Coordinates: 48.9863°N 2.4499°E
- Completed: 1900

Design and construction
- Architect: Sieur Frappart

The Hôtel de Ville (French pronunciation: [otɛl də vil], City Hall) is a municipal building in Gonesse, Val-d'Oise, in the northeastern suburbs of Paris, standing on Rue de Paris. It has been included on the Inventaire général des monuments by the French Ministry of Culture since 1993.

== History ==
Following the French Revolution, the town council initially met in the clergy house on what is now Place du 8 Mai 1945. In 1832, the local Commission Administrative de l'Hôpital (hospital commission) agreed to allocate funds to demolish the original building and to erect a combined town hall and school on the site. The new building accommodated the municipal office on the ground floor and a school for up to 100 children on the first floor. The building ceased to be used for educational purposes once a new school opened on Rue Fürmanek in 1869, and, after it ceased to be used for municipal purposes as well, it served as a courthouse for the justices of the peace until it was demolished in 1978.

In the 1930s, following significant population growth, the council decided to acquire a more substantial building. The building they selected was Château Frappart on the south side of Rue de Paris. The building had been commissioned as a private residence by a local architect, Sieur Frappart, in the late 19th century. Construction work started in 1895. The building was designed by Frappart himself in the neoclassical style, built in red brick with stone dressings and was completed in 1900. The design involved an asymmetrical main frontage of eight bays facing south onto a park bounded by what is now Place du Général de Gaulle. The fourth bay on the left featured a semi-circular section, which was fenestrated by round headed windows and surmounted by a balustrade. There was a large round headed window with a keystone and garlands on the first floor. The left-hand wing was fenestrated by round headed windows on both floors, while the right-hand wing featured a short flight of steps leading up to a three-bay porch formed by a pair of Doric order columns supporting an entablature. The right-hand wing was fenestrated by round headed windows on the first floor and featured an additional bay which was slightly recessed from the rest of the frontage. There were also five dormer windows at attic level. Internally, the building featured a fine masonry staircase with iron railings.

Although the council acquired the building in 1939, because of the intervention of the Second World War, it was not converted for municipal use until 1948. A new war memorial, depicting a small boy placing a brick in a wall, which was intended to commemorate the lives of local service personnel who had died in both world wars, was created by the Joël Vergne workshop and unveiled in the park in front of the town hall by the mayor, Jean-Pierre Blazy, in November 2017.

All 80 windows in the building were replaced by craftsmen from the workshop, Option Bois, under the direction of a master-craftsman, Thierry Mesnil, in 2022.
