= Romane Bernies =

French basketball player

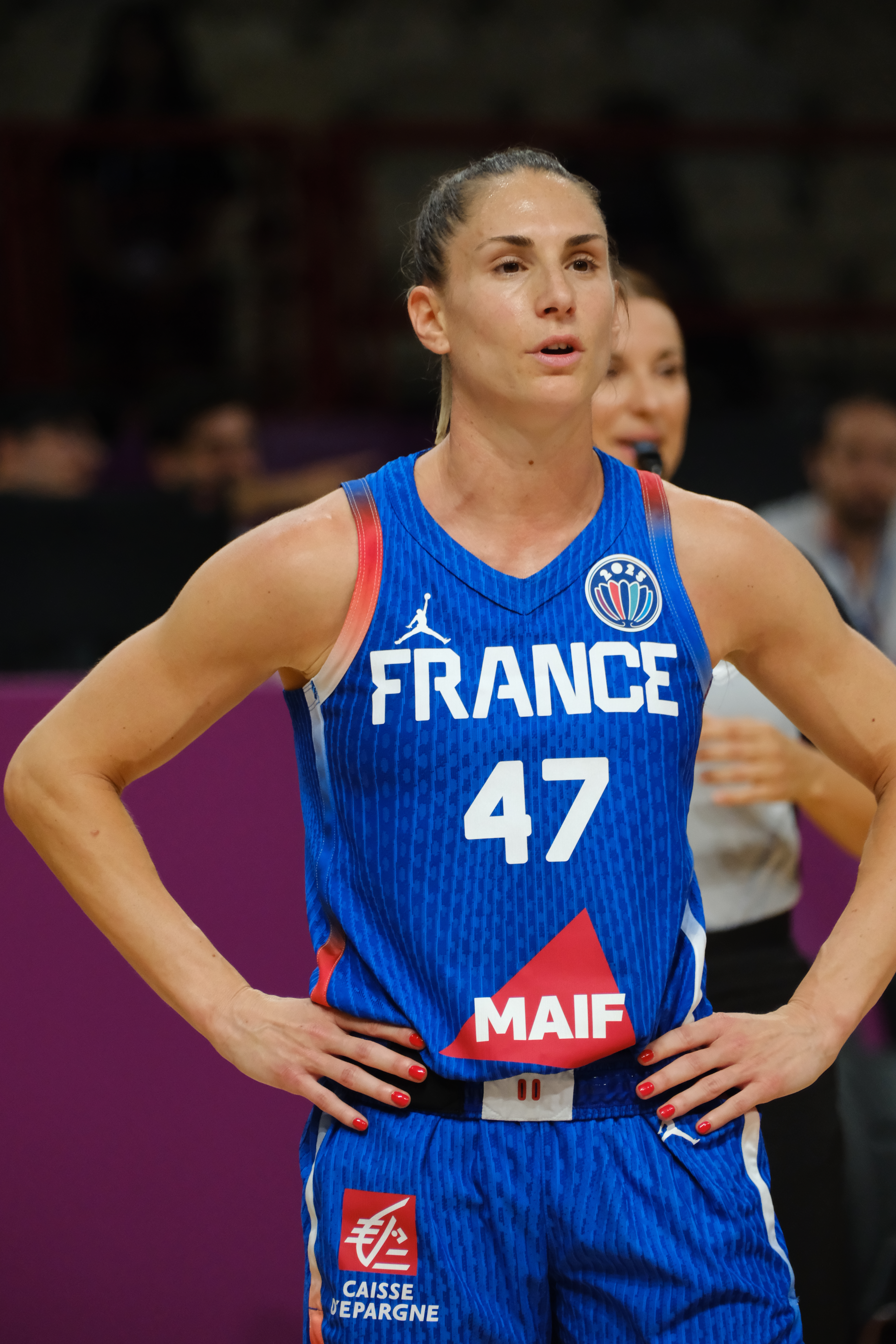
- Bernies with France in 2025

No. 47 – Basket Lattes
- Position: Point guard
- League: LFB

Personal information
- Born: 27 June 1993 (age 33) Agen, France
- Listed height: 5 ft 7 in (1.70 m)

Career information
- WNBA draft: 2015: undrafted

Career history
- 2010–2015: Bourges
- 2015-2016: Angers
- 2017–2018: Montpellier
- 2018–present: Lattes
Medals
Women's basketball
Representing (France) France
Olympic Games
Silver medal – second place	2024 Paris	Team
FIBA World Cup
Silver medal – second place	2026 Germany
EuroBasket
Third place	2023 Israel/Slovenia

Romane Bernies (born 27 June 1993) is a French basketball player for Basket Lattes and the French national team.

== Career ==
She participated at the 2018 FIBA Women's Basketball World Cup.

== Orders ==
- Knight of the French Order of Merit: 2024
