= Christelle Diallo =

French basketball player

Zainabe Christelle Diallo
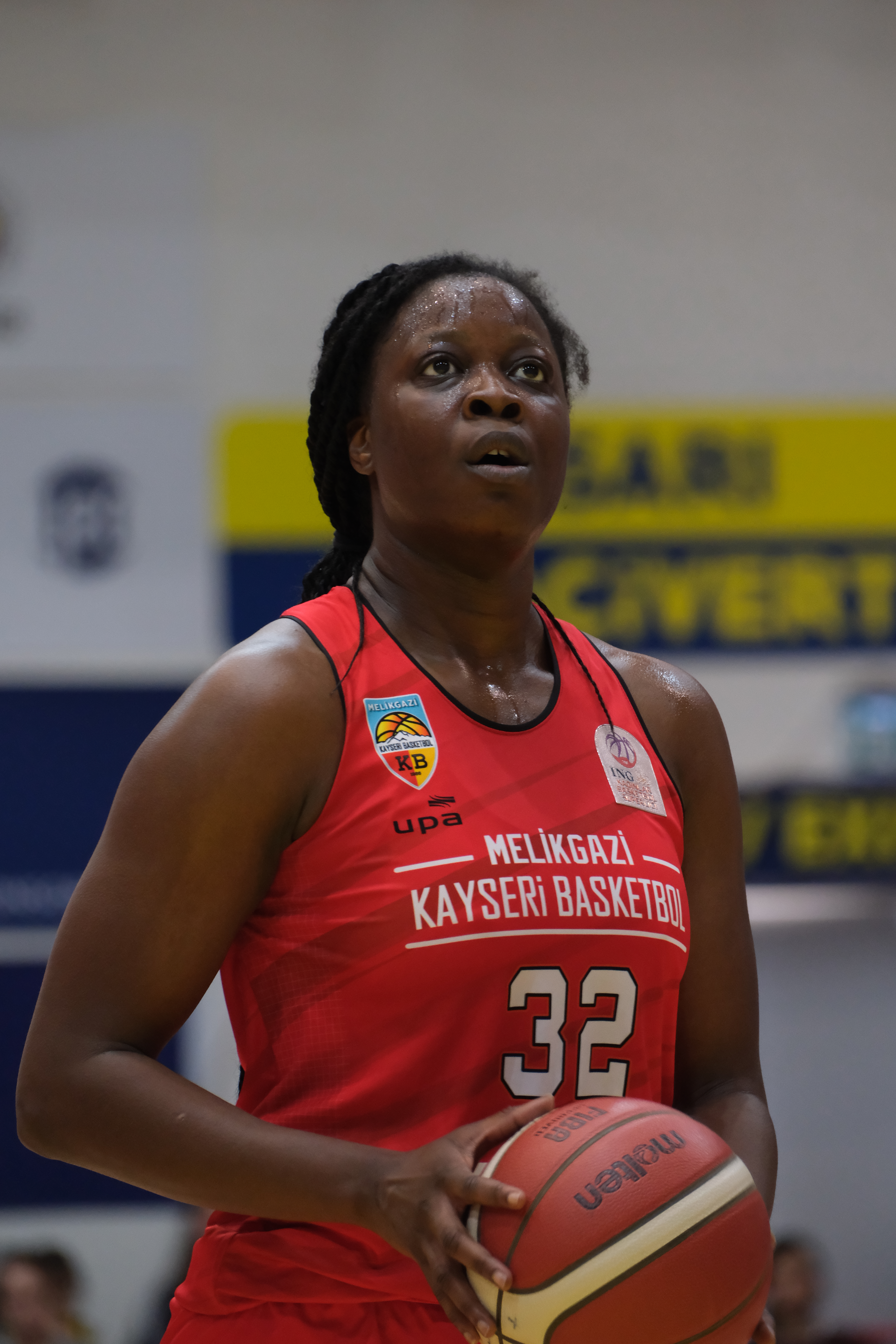
- Diallo in 2025

No. 32 – Basket Lattes
- Position: Center
- League: La Boulangère Wonderligue

Personal information
- Born: March 12, 1993 (age 33) Issy-les-Moulineaux, France
- Listed height: 6 ft 4 in (1.93 m)

Christelle Diallo (born 12 March 1993 in Issy-Les-Moulineaux, France) is a French basketball player for the Basket Lattes of the La Boulangère Wonderligue.

== Career ==
Diallo was the top scorer for the French team at the 2010 U17 World Championship in Rodez, where they won the silver medal.

After three years of training at INSEP (National Institute of Sport, Expertise, and Performance), Diallo joined Tango Bourges Basket in 2011. She saw limited play time in her first year, appearing in only eight games.

In 2012, Diallo participated in the Junior European Championship, finishing as the second-highest scorer for her team (9.2 points). The team placed fifth.

In April 2013, she won her second French championship title with Bourges, this time as a regular player in the rotation, appearing in 30 regular season games. After the 2012–2013 season, she left Bourges to join Nice. Here, she notably recorded a career-high 22 points in a game against Tarbes. The team was relegated after Diallo's first season there. In Summer 2014, Diallo joined Lyon.

In 2014, Diallo was preselected to the French team, but was not kept in the final selection to compete in the FIBA World Championship.

After three seasons with Lyon, Diallo left to spend the 2017–2018 season with Tarbes. Here, she averaged 8.1 points and 3.3 rebounds. In 2018, she joined Villeneuve-d'Ascq.

In June 2018, Diallo was selected for the French 3x3 team that competed in the FIBA World Cup, which was held from June 8–12 in Manila.

In 2020, she joined Flammes Carolo. In November 2021, during her second season, she left the club on her own terms, despite averaging 6.3 points at 47% field goal percentage and 2.7 rebounds in 19 minutes per game on the league-leading team. A few days later, she signed back with her former club, Villeneuve-d'Ascq, which was facing the prolonged unavailability of Djéné Diawara.

On 8 May 2023 she signed for Casademont Zaragoza of the Liga Femenina de basket, the top basketball league for women in Spain, until 14 May 2024, when her termination was announced.

On 6 February 2025, ÇBK Mersin, competing in the Turkish Women's Basketball League, announced that they had signed with Diallo until the end of the 2024–2025 season.

In September 2025, she joined the Basket Lattes. Most recently, she has resigned with the team for the 2026–2027 season.
