= Alice Nayo =

French basketball player

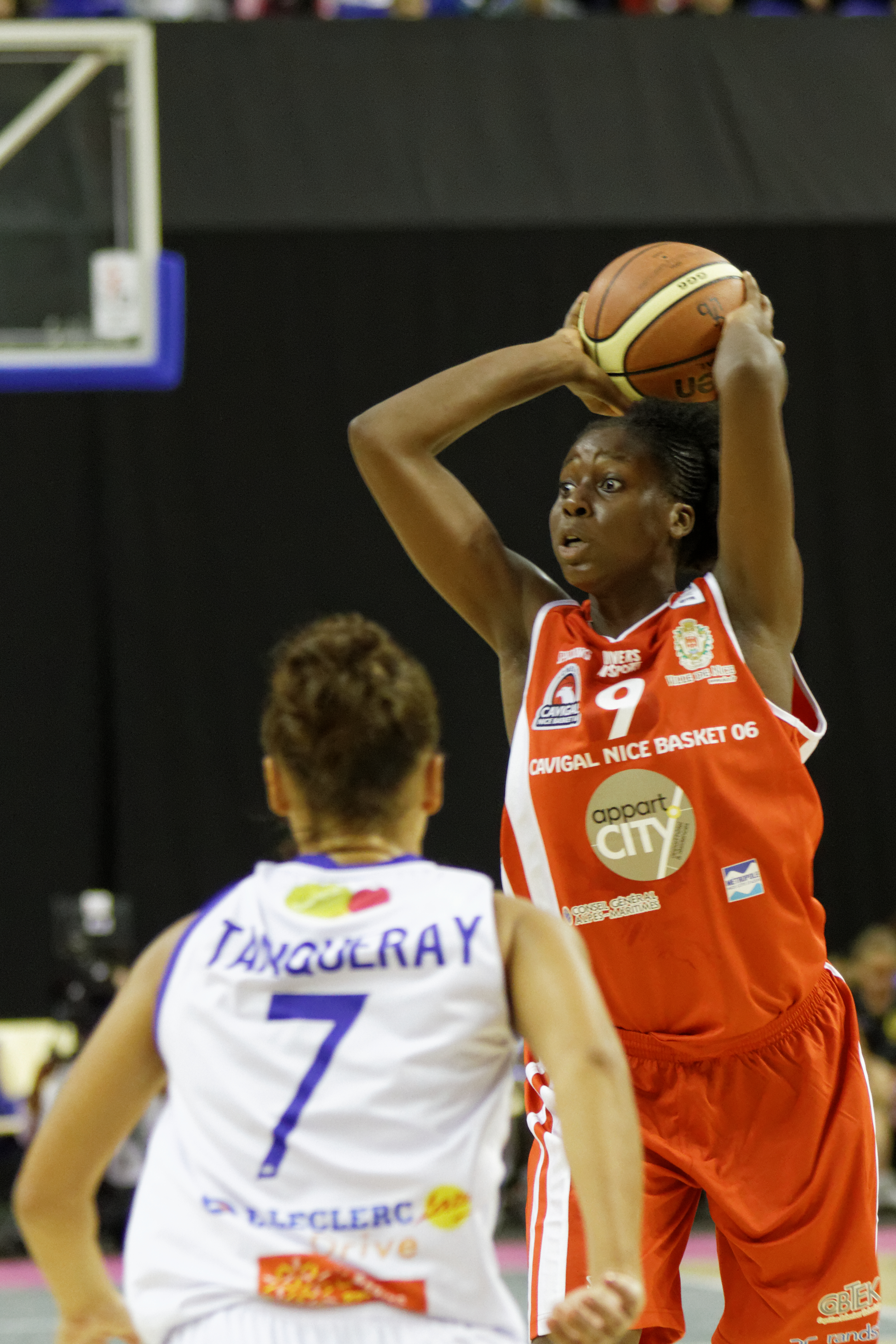

Alice Nayo (born January 16, 1993, in Gonesse, France) is a French basketball player who plays for club ESB Villeneuve-d'Ascq of the League feminine de basket the top league of basketball for women in France.
