= Lycée René Cassin (Gonesse) =

Senior high school in Gonesse, France

Lycée René Cassin is a senior high school in Gonesse, Val-d'Oise, France, in the Paris metropolitan area. It was named after French lawyer René Cassin.

== History ==
In 2009 there was an incident where a female mathematics teacher was hit with tear gas.

In 2010 there were 1,400 students and 95 teachers. That year, some teachers went on strike to oppose the proposed Chatel reform.

In 2016 several teachers protested the sizes of their classes. By September 2 most of the employees were striking. That year there were 1,500 students.

In 2017 a student was injured after being attacked by four people.
