= Gonesse =

- Commune
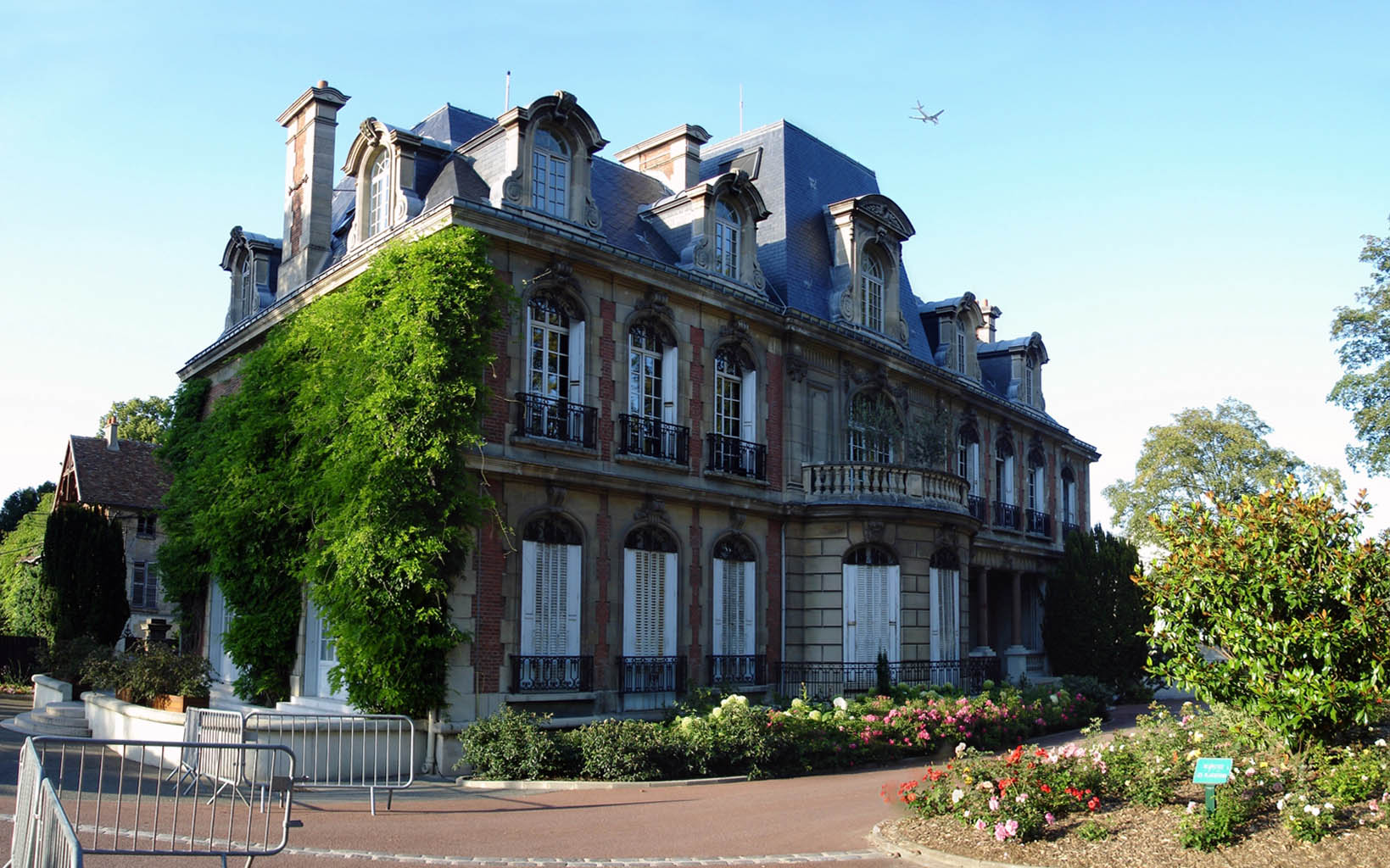
- The Hôtel de Ville

- Coat of arms

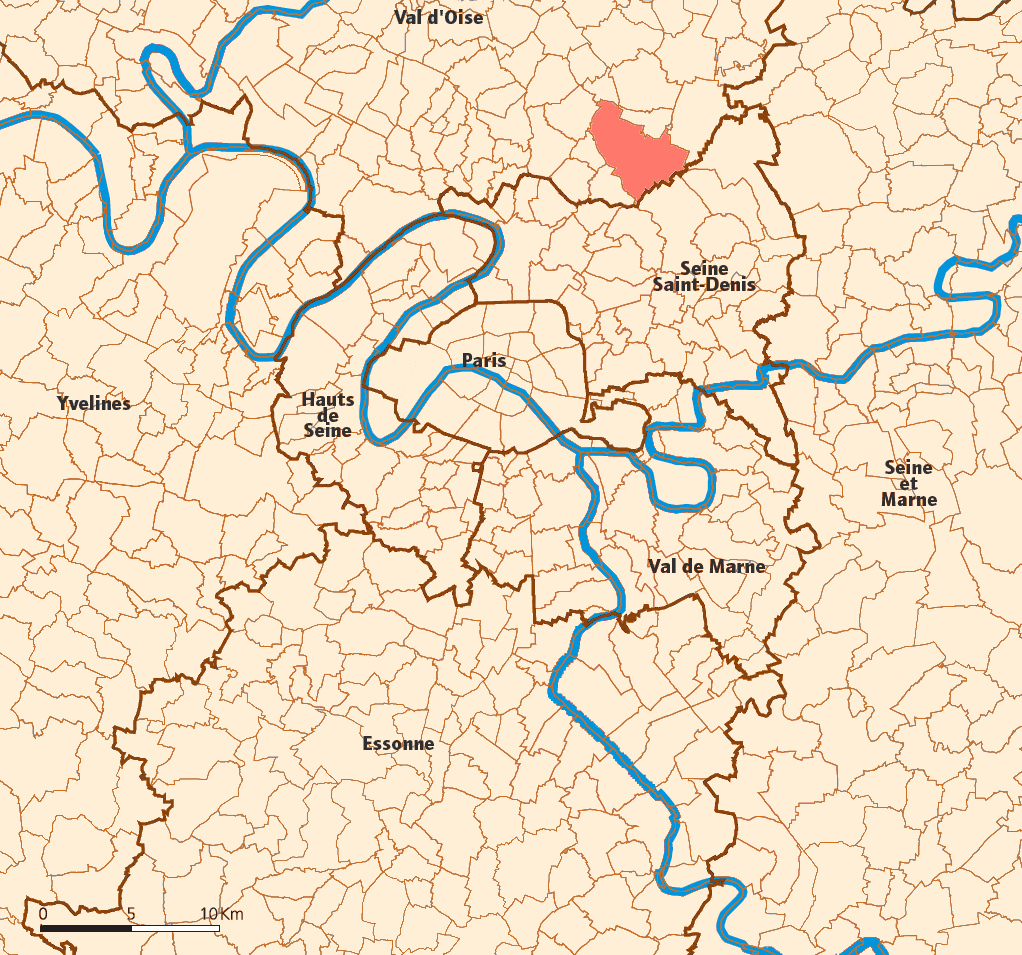
- Location (in red) within Paris inner and outer suburbs
- Location of Gonesse
- Location within France Location within Île-de-France (region)
- Coordinates: 48°59′15″N 2°26′58″E
- Country: France
- Region: Île-de-France
- Department: Val-d'Oise
- Arrondissement: Sarcelles
- Canton: Villiers-le-Bel
- Intercommunality: CA Roissy Pays de France

Government
  - Mayor (2020–2026): Jean-Pierre Blazy
- Area^{1}: 20.09 km^{2} (7.76 sq mi)
- Population (2023): 27,707
  - Density: 1,379/km^{2} (3,572/sq mi)
- Time zone: UTC+01:00 (CET)
  - Summer (DST): UTC+02:00 (CEST)
- INSEE/Postal code: 95277 /95500
- ^{1} French Land Register data, which excludes lakes, ponds, glaciers > 1 km^{2} (0.386 sq mi or 247 acres) and river estuaries.

Gonesse (French pronunciation: [ɡɔnɛs]) is a commune in the Val-d'Oise department, in the north-eastern suburbs of Paris, France. It is located 16.5 km (10.3 mi) from the centre of Paris.

The commune lies approximately eight kilometres (five miles) north of Le Bourget Airport, and it is six kilometres (four miles) south-west of Charles de Gaulle International Airport.

== History ==
Since Carolingian times, cereals have been grown in Gonesse. In the period of the 12th through to the 16th centuries, the cultivation of grain was supplemented by drapery, in particular the production of the coarse woollen material of the gaunace. The commune was an important producer of wheat for the Parisian market in modern times, until the decline of its bakery trade at the end of the 18th century helped feed a strong migration to the capital.

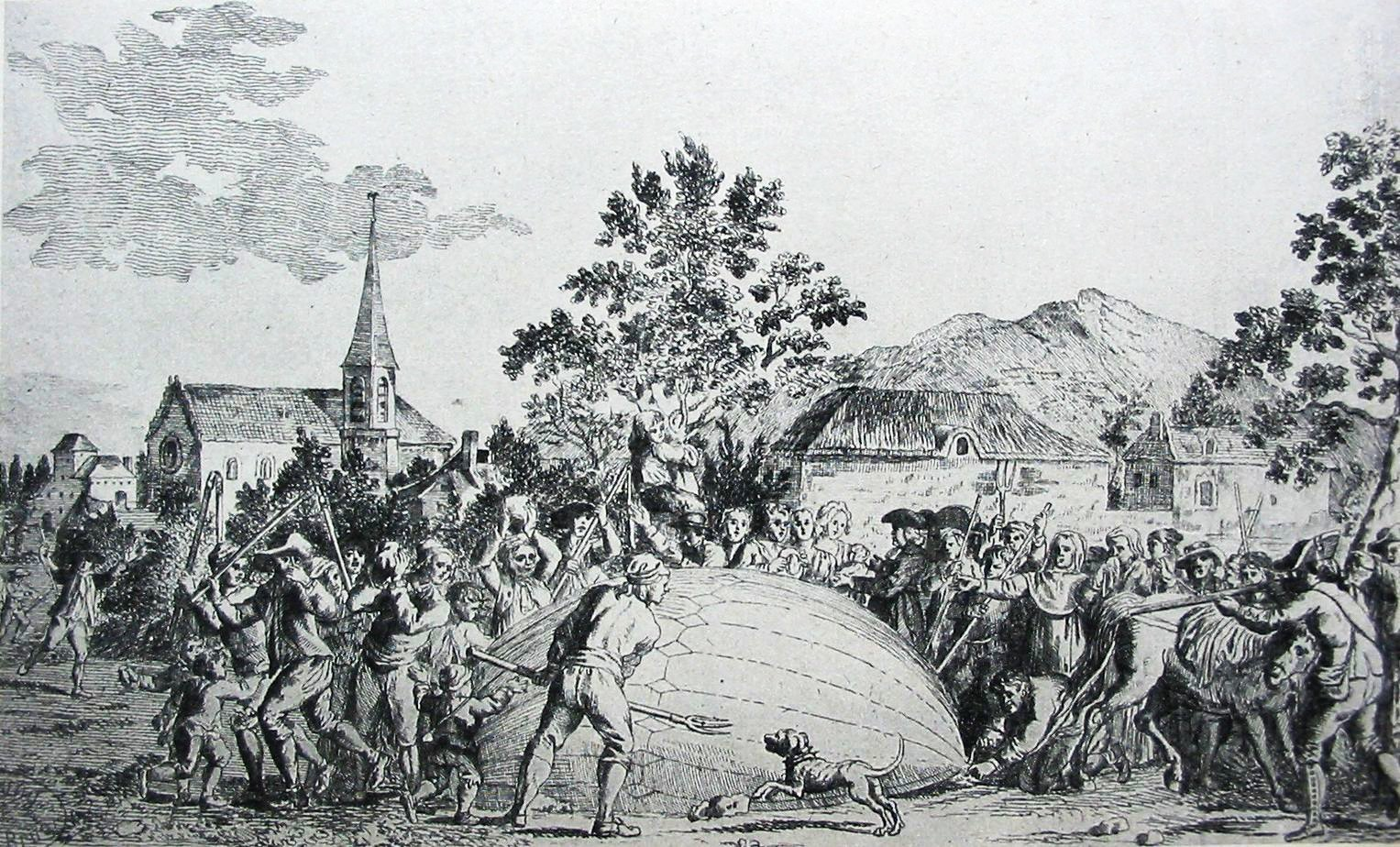
The balloon built by Jacques Charles and the Robert brothers is attacked by terrified villagers.

The world's first hydrogen filled balloon—the unmanned balloon launched by Jacques Charles and the Robert brothers from the Champ de Mars in Paris on 27 August 1783—flew for 45 minutes and landed in Gonesse, where the reportedly terrified local peasants destroyed it with pitchforks. This caused the government to issue a statement on the harmlessness and the scientific value of such experiments.

In 1815, Marshal Grouchy arrived in Gonesse in the course of the War of the Sixth Coalition, with 40,000 troops and 120 artillery pieces. On 2 July, the Duke of Wellington made his headquarters at the commune. The Hôtel de Ville was built as a private residence and completed in 1900.

Since June 1939, the property Frapart (the Castle) is used as the main establishment of the urban administration.

Jean Camus, Louis Furmanek, Pierre Lorgnet, and Albert Drouhot from Gonesse belonged to the French Resistance movement during the German occupation of France from 1940 to 1944.

On 25 July 2000, Air France Flight 4590—a Concorde supersonic transport—crashed onto a hotel in the town after a tyre blew out, caused by running over a strip of metal that had fallen off a DC-10 at nearby Charles de Gaulle International Airport. The crash led to the deaths of all 109 people on board and four more on the ground. The Concorde crash occurred fewer than 6 km from Goussainville, the site of the crash of the supersonic Tupolev Tu-144 during the 1973 Paris Air Show.

== Population ==
Historical population

Year	Pop.	±% p.a.
1793	2,400	—
1800	2,216	−1.13%
1806	2,020	−1.53%
1821	2,008	−0.04%
1831	2,147	+0.67%
1836	2,123	−0.22%
1841	2,221	+0.91%
1846	2,257	+0.32%
1851	2,263	+0.05%
1856	2,348	+0.74%
1861	2,684	+2.71%
1866	2,831	+1.07%
1872	2,526	−1.88%
1876	2,859	+3.14%
1881	2,935	+0.53%
1886	3,008	+0.49%
1891	2,642	−2.56%
1896	2,678	+0.27%
1901	2,757	+0.58%

Year	Pop.	±% p.a.
1906	2,902	+1.03%
1911	3,131	+1.53%
1921	3,231	+0.31%
1926	3,537	+1.83%
1931	4,359	+4.27%
1936	4,638	+1.25%
1946	4,006	−1.45%
1954	4,881	+2.50%
1962	8,517	+7.21%
1968	21,187	+16.40%
1975	21,390	+0.14%
1982	22,896	+0.98%
1990	23,152	+0.14%
1999	24,721	+0.73%
2007	26,262	+0.76%
2012	26,343	+0.06%
2017	25,999	−0.26%
2023	27,707	+1.07%

Source: EHESS and INSEE (1968-2023)

== Sights ==
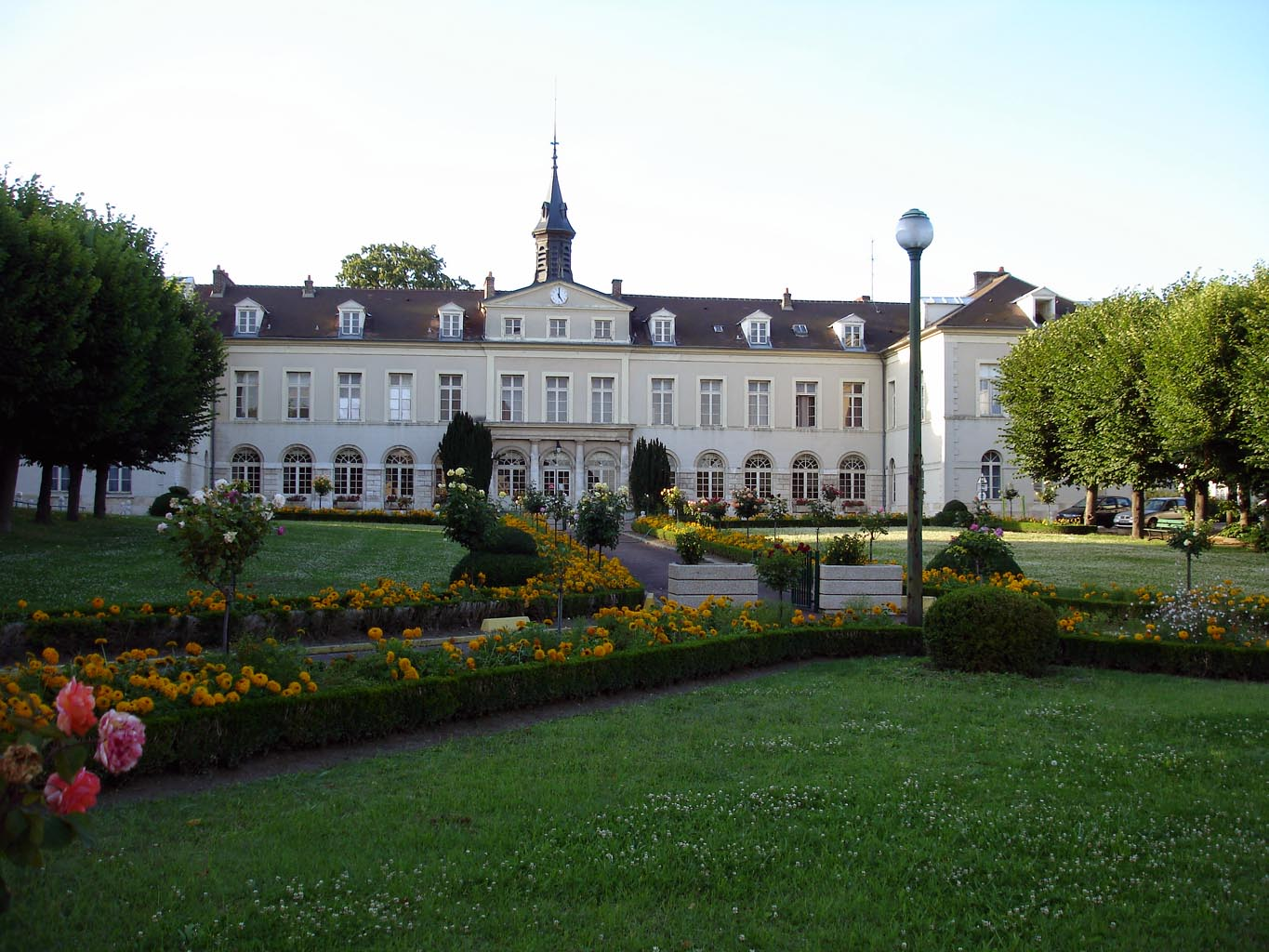
Hotel-Dieu

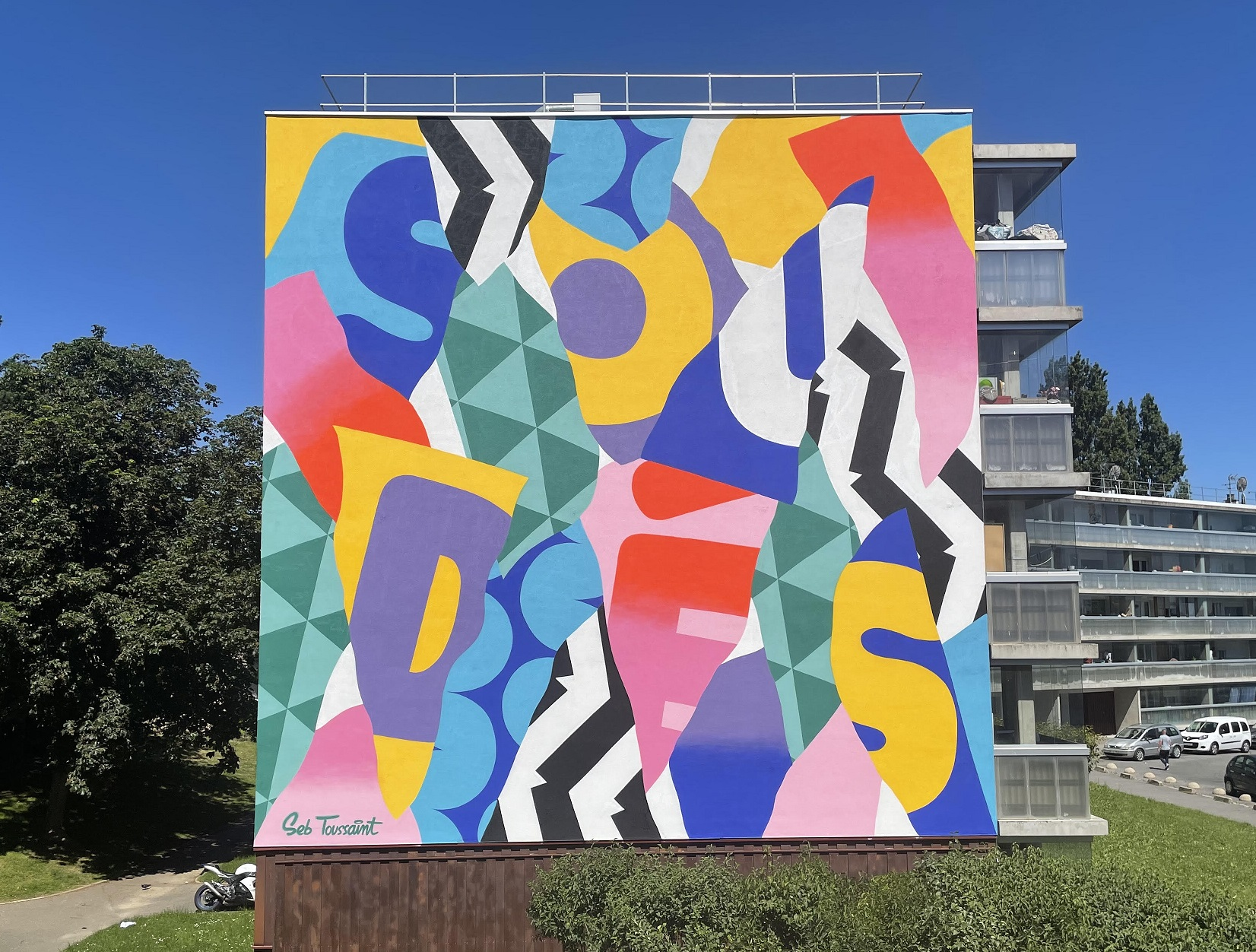
Mural by Seb Toussaint at the La Fauconnière social housing estate

Among the places worthwhile to visit in the town are the Church of St. Peter and St. Paul, the old Hotel-Dieu, the Hotel-Dieu, the lofts Garlande and Orgemont, and the estates of Malmaison and of Coulanges.

== Transport ==
Gonesse is served neither by the Paris Métro, RER, nor the suburban rail network. The closest station is the Villiers-le-Bel–Gonesse–Arnouville station on the Paris RER D. This station is located in the neighbouring commune of Arnouville-lès-Gonesse, 2.6 km (1.6 mi) from Gonesse town centre.

== Education ==
As of 2015, the commune had 20 municipal primary schools with a total of 3,526; pupils, including 11 pre-schools (écoles maternelles) with a total of 1,389 pupils (in addition to 20 children in toute petite programmes) and nine elementary schools with 2,137 total pupils.

Junior high schools:

- College Philippe Auguste
- Collège Robert Doisneau
- Collège François Truffaut

There is one senior high school, Lycée René Cassin-Gonesse.

== Notable people ==
- Philip Augustus, King of France born in Gonesse 21 August 1165.
- Simon Abkarian, French-Armenian actor
- Ernest Broquet, former mayor of Gonesse and recipient of the Legion of Honor
- Woyo Coulibaly, footballer
- Axel Disasi, footballer
- Annabelle Euranie, judoka
- Mohamed Fofana, footballer
- Franck Julienne, footballer
- Aboubakar Kamara, footballer
- Grejohn Kyei, footballer
- Louis Labeyrie, basketball player
- Cedric Moukouri, footballer
- Alice Nayo, basketball player
- Thierry Rupert, basketball player
- Dylan Saint-Louis, footballer
- Halifa Soule, footballer
- Warren Tchimbembe, footballer

== Twinning with Leonessa ==
Gonesse has been twinned with the town of Leonessa in Rieti, Italy, since 1981.

== See also ==
- Communes of the Val-d'Oise department
- Europa City
