= Alessandra Formica =

Italian basketball player

No. 12 – Virtus Eirene Ragusa
- Position: Center
- League: LegA

Personal information
- Born: March 13, 1993 (age 33) Augusta, Italy
- Listed height: 6 ft 2 in (1.88 m)

Alessandra Formica (born March 13, 1993) is an Italian basketball player for Virtus Eirene Ragusa Italy and the Italian national team.

She participated in the EuroBasket Women 2017.
