= Basket Lattes Montpellier Agglomération =

French women's basketball team

Lattes Montpellier
- League: La Boulangère Wonderligue
- Founded: 1974
- Arena: Palais des Sports (capacity: 1,400)
- Location: Lattes, France
- Team colors: Blue and White
- President: (France) Philippe Sebbane
- Head coach: (France) Valéry Demory
- Championships: 2 French Leagues; 4 French Cup
- Website: blma.fr
Home	Away

Basket Lattes Montpellier Agglomération (BLMA) is a French professional women's basketball club from Lattes, Montpellier Agglomération. Founded in 1974 as Basket Lattes-Maurin Montpellier, it took its current name in 2002.

Lattes won the 2011 national cup and was the national championship's runner-up in 2008. It has played the Euroleague in 2009 and 2012, in addition to three Eurocup appearances.

== Titles ==
- Ligue Féminine de Basketball

Champions (2): 2013–14, 2015–16

- Coupe de France

Champions (4): 2011, 2013, 2015, 2016

== Roster ==
=== Current roster ===
Note: Flags indicate national team eligibility at FIBA-sanctioned events. Players may hold other non-FIBA nationalities not displayed.

BLMA roster
Players
Coaches

Pos.	No.	Nat.	Name	Ht.	Age
CG	2	(United States)	Hoppie, Qadashah	1.70 m (5 ft 7 in)	26 – 10 October 1999
SF	5	(Czech Republic)	Pospisilova, Julie	1.83 m (6 ft 0 in)	27 – 20 June 1999
SG	6	(France)	Salgues, Kenza	1.74 m (5 ft 9 in)	26 – 18 May 2000
PG	15	(Slovakia)	Lambert, Kyra	1.75 m (5 ft 9 in)	29 – 6 December 1996
C	19	(France)	Cisse, Sarah	1.90 m (6 ft 3 in)	19 – 26 January 2007
PF	26	(France)	Rabot, Garance	1.80 m (5 ft 11 in)	24 – 4 June 2002
C	32	(France)	Diallo, Christelle	1.93 m (6 ft 4 in)	33 – 12 March 1993
SG	33	(France)	Angloma, Nell	1.85 m (6 ft 1 in)	20 – 12 June 2006
PF	34	(United States)	Breen, Samantha	1.85 m (6 ft 1 in)	27 – 10 August 1999
PG	47	(France)	Bernies, Romane	1.70 m (5 ft 7 in)	33 – 27 June 1993

Head coach

- (France) Valéry Demory

Assistant coach(es)

- (France) Gurvan Morvan

Legend

- (C) Team captain
- Injured

- Roster
Updated: 2 July 2026
