= Ivana Brajković =

Serbian basketball player

No. 14 – CREF ¡Hola!
- Position: Center
- League: Liga Femenina

Personal information
- Born: January 11, 1993 (age 33) Belgrade, FR Yugoslavia
- Listed height: 1.95 m (6 ft 5 in)

Career information
- WNBA draft: 2015: undrafted
- Playing career: 2009–present

Career history
- 2009–2015: Radivoj Korać
- 2015–2016: Slovanka MB
- 2016–present: CREF ¡Hola!

Ivana Brajković (Serbian Cyrillic: Ивана Брајковић; born January 11, 1993) is a Serbian women's basketball player.

== Honours ==
Radivoj Korać

- National Championship of Serbia (2): 2013–14, 2014–15
- National Cup of Serbia (1): 2013-14
- Adriatic League Women (1): 2013-14
