= Saint-Mards-en-Othe =

Commune in Grand Est, France

- Commune
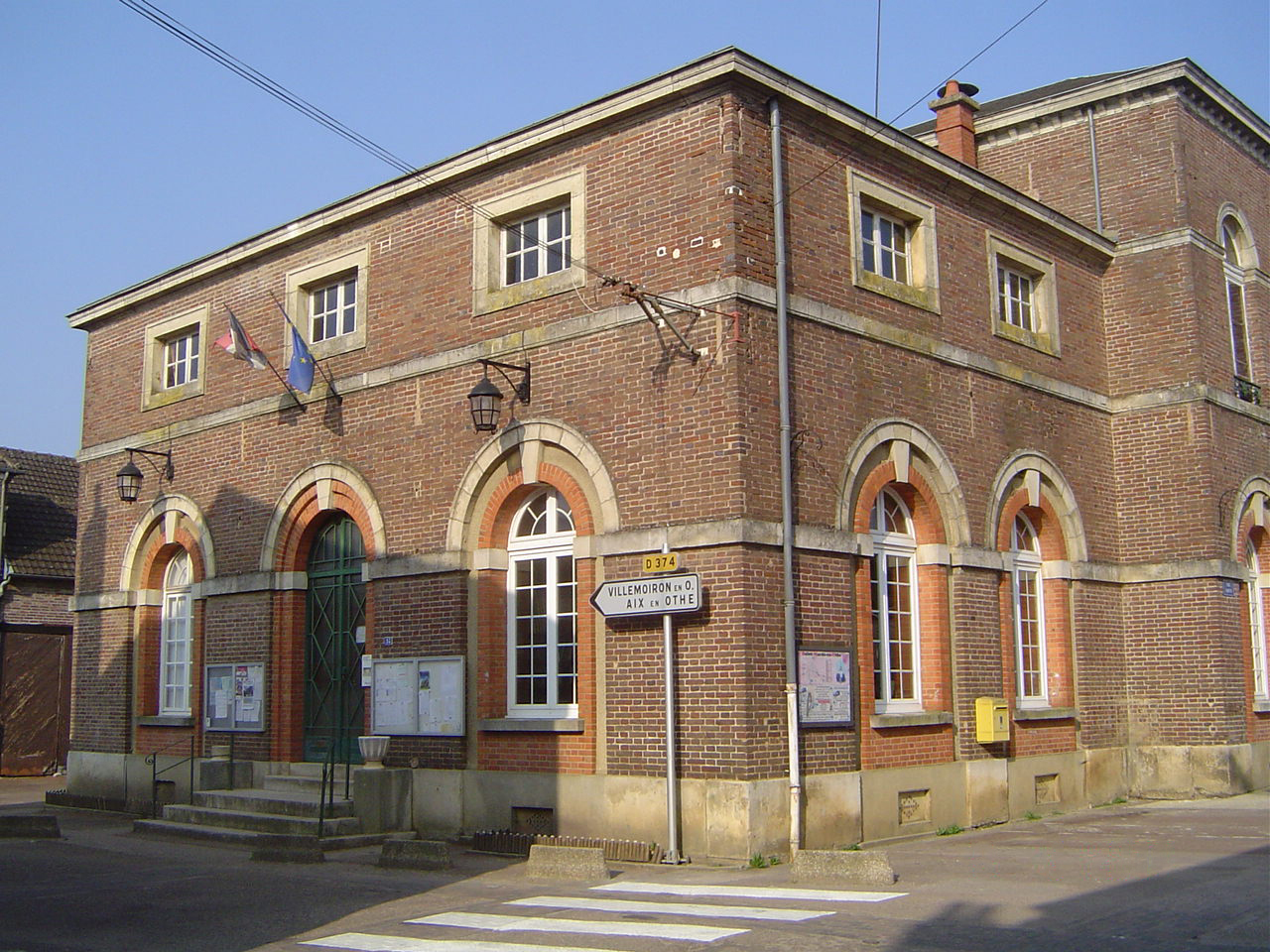
- The town hall in Saint-Mards-en-Othe

- Coat of arms
- Location of Saint-Mards-en-Othe
- Location within France Location within Grand Est
- Coordinates: 48°10′25″N 3°48′00″E
- Country: France
- Region: Grand Est
- Department: Aube
- Arrondissement: Troyes
- Canton: Aix-Villemaur-Pâlis

Government
  - Mayor (2020–2026): Lionel Bertin
- Area^{1}: 31.4 km^{2} (12.1 sq mi)
- Elevation: 172 m (564 ft)
- Population (2023): 635
  - Density: 20.2/km^{2} (52.4/sq mi)
- Time zone: UTC+01:00 (CET)
  - Summer (DST): UTC+02:00 (CEST)
- INSEE/Postal code: 10350 /10160
- ^{1} French Land Register data, which excludes lakes, ponds, glaciers > 1 km^{2} (0.386 sq mi or 247 acres) and river estuaries.

Saint-Mards-en-Othe (French pronunciation: [sɛ̃ maʁ ɑ̃.n‿ɔt], lit. 'Saint-Mards in Othe') is a commune in the Aube department in north-central France.

== Population ==
Historical population
Year	Pop.	±% p.a.
1968	693	—
1975	575	−2.63%
1982	556	−0.48%
1990	513	−1.00%
1999	543	+0.63%
2007	636	+2.00%
2012	658	+0.68%
2017	640	−0.55%
2023	635	−0.13%
Source: INSEE

== See also ==
- Communes of the Aube department
