= Madagascar men's national under-16 basketball team =

Madagascar
- FIBA zone: FIBA Africa
- National federation: Fédération Malagasy de Basket-Ball
- Coach: Angelot Razafiarivony

U17 World Cup
- Appearances: None

U16 AfroBasket
- Appearances: 2 (2013, 2017)
- Medals: None

The Madagascar men's national under-16 basketball team is a national basketball team of Madagascar, administered by the Fédération Malagasy de Basket-Ball. It represents the country in men's international under-16 basketball competitions.

== FIBA U16 AfroBasket participations ==
Year	Result
2013	4th
2017	5th

== History ==
At the 2013 FIBA Africa Under-16 Championship on home soil, they finished fourth, behind champions Angola, Egypt and Tunisia.

At the 2017 FIBA Under-16 African Championship in Mauritius, Madagascar was coached by Angelot Razafiarivony. The Malagasy recorded four wins in eight games, with one significant victory over Algeria, who would go on to finish third behind runners-up Egypt and eventual champions Mali. Overall, Madagascar finished fifth, after beating Rwanda in the Classification Game.

Players of the 2013 team that later capped for the senior national team include Elly Randriamampionona, Kiady Mahery Rabarijoelina and others. From the 2017 squad, Sitraka Raharimanantoanina later followed.

== See also ==
- Madagascar men's national basketball team
- Madagascar men's national under-18 basketball team
- Madagascar women's national under-16 basketball team
