= DR Congo men's national under-16 basketball team =

Democratic Republic of the Congo
- Joined FIBA: 1963
- FIBA zone: FIBA Africa
- National federation: Febaco

U17 World Cup
- Appearances: None

U16 AfroBasket
- Appearances: 1 (2013)
- Medals: None
Home	Away

The Democratic Republic of the Congo men's national under-16 basketball team (French: Équipe nationale masculine de basket-ball des moins de 16 ans de la République démocratique du Congo) is a national basketball team of the Democratic Republic of the Congo, administered by the Basketball Federation of Democratic Republic of Congo (French: République démocratique du Congo Fédération de basket-ball). It represents the country in men's international under-16 basketball competitions.

== FIBA U16 AfroBasket ==
So far, their only participation at the FIBA U16 AfroBasket was the 2013 FIBA Africa Under-16 Championship, where they finished in 5th place.

== See also ==
- DR Congo men's national basketball team
- DR Congo men's national under-18 basketball team
- DR Congo women's national under-19 basketball team
