= Tunisia men's national under-16 basketball team =

Tunisia
- Joined FIBA: 1956
- FIBA zone: FIBA Africa
- National federation: FTBB
- Nickname(s): نسور قرطاج (Eagles of Carthage)

U17 World Cup
- Appearances: None

U16 AfroBasket
- Appearances: 7
- Medals: (silver) Silver: 1 (2011); (bronze) Bronze: 1 (2013)

U16 Arab Championship
- Appearances: 8
- Medals: (silver) Silver: 1 (2023)
Home	Away
Medal record
Event	1st	2nd	3rd
U16 Africa Championship	0	1	1
U16 Arab Championship	0	1	0
Total	0	2	1

The Tunisia men's national under-16 basketball team (Arabic: منتخب تونس تحت 16 سنة لكرة السلة), nicknamed Les Aigles de Carthage (The Eagles of Carthage or The Carthage Eagles), is a national basketball team of Tunisia, administered by the Tunisia Basketball Federation (FTBB). It represents the country in international under-16 men's basketball competitions.

== Competitive record ==
Champions Runners-up Third place Fourth place

- Red border color indicates tournament was held on home soil.

=== FIBA U17 World Cup ===
FIBA Under-17 Basketball World Cup
Appearances: 0
Year	Position	Host
(Germany) 2010	Did not participate	Hamburg, Germany
(Lithuania) 2012	Did not participate	Kaunas, Lithuania
(United Arab Emirates) 2014	Did not participate	Dubai, United Arab Emirates
(Spain) 2016	Did not participate	Zaragoza, Spain
(Argentina) 2018	Did not participate	Rosario / Santa Fe, Argentina
(Bulgaria) 2020	Cancelled due to the COVID-19 pandemic	
(Spain) 2022	Did not participate	Málaga, Spain
(Turkey) 2024	Did not qualify	Istanbul, Turkey
(Turkey) 2026	Did not qualify	Istanbul, Turkey
(Greece) 2028	To be determined	Athens, Greece

=== FIBA U16 AfroBasket ===
FIBA U16 AfroBasket
Appearances: 7
Year	Position	Host
(Mozambique) 2009	Did not participate	Maputo, Mozambique
(Egypt) 2011	(silver) 2nd	Alexandria, Egypt
(Madagascar) 2013	(bronze) 3rd	Antananarivo, Madagascar
(Mali) 2015	7th	Bamako, Mali
(Mauritius) 2017	4th	Vacoas-Phoenix, Mauritius
(Cape Verde) 2019	6th	Praia, Cape Verde
(Egypt) 2021	Did not participate	Cairo, Egypt
(Tunisia) 2023	9th	Monastir, Tunisia
(Rwanda) 2025	6th	Kigali, Rwanda

=== Arab U16 Basketball Championship ===
Arab U16 Basketball Championship
Appearances: 8
Year	Position	Host
(Jordan) 2023	Silver (silver)	Amman, Jordan

== See also ==
- Tunisia men's national basketball team
- Tunisia men's national under-20 basketball team
- Tunisia men's national under-19 basketball team
- Tunisia women's national under-16 basketball team
