= Guinea men's national under-17 basketball team =

Guinea
- FIBA zone: FIBA Africa
- National federation: Fédération Guinéenne de Basket-Ball
- Coach: Ibrahim Touré

U17 World Cup
- Appearances: 1
- Medals: None

U16 AfroBasket
- Appearances: 4
- Medals: (gold) Gold: 1 (2023)

The Guinea men's national under-16 and under-17 basketball team is a national basketball team of Guinea, administered by the Guinean Basketball Federation. It represents the country in international under-16 and under-17 men's basketball competitions.

== U16 AfroBasket record ==
Year	Pos.	Pld	W	L
(Mozambique) 2009	9th	4	0	4
(Egypt) 2011	Did not qualify			
(Madagascar) 2013	Did not qualify			
(Mali) 2015	Did not qualify			
(Mauritius) 2017	Did not qualify			
(Cape Verde) 2019	4th	7	4	3
(Egypt) 2021	Did not qualify			
(Tunisia) 2023	1st place, gold medalist(s)	7	7	0
(Rwanda) 2025	11th	4	1	3
Total	4/9	22	12	10

== U17 World Cup record ==
Year	Pos.	Pld	W	L
(Germany) 2010	Did not qualify			
(Lithuania) 2012	Did not qualify			
(United Arab Emirates) 2014	Did not qualify			
(Spain) 2016	Did not qualify			
(Argentina) 2018	Did not qualify			
(Spain) 2022	Did not qualify			
(Turkey) 2024	14th	7	2	5
(Turkey) 2026	Did not qualify			
(Greece) 2028	To be determined			
Total	1/9	7	2	5

== See also ==
- Guinea men's national basketball team
- Guinea men's national under-18 basketball team
- Guinea women's national under-16 basketball team
