= 2013 in basketball =

The following are the basketball events of the year 2013 throughout the world. Tournaments include international (FIBA), professional (club) and amateur and collegiate levels.

== National tournaments ==
=== FIBA Basketball World Cup qualifiers ===
- 1–11 August: 2013 FIBA Asia Championship for Men in Metro Manila, Philippines:
  (gold) Iran
  (silver) Philippines
  (bronze) South Korea
- 14–18 August: 2013 FIBA Oceania Championship for Men in Auckland, New Zealand and Canberra, Australia:
  (gold) Australia
  (silver) New Zealand
- 20–31 August: 2013 FIBA Africa Championship for Men in Abidjan, Ivory Coast:
  (gold) Angola
  (silver) Egypt
  (bronze) Senegal
- 30 August – 11 September: 2013 FIBA Americas Championship for Men in Caracas, Venezuela:
  (gold) Mexico
  (silver) Puerto Rico
  (bronze) Argentina
  4th: Dominican Republic
- 4–22 September: FIBA EuroBasket 2013 in Slovenia:
  (gold) France
  (silver) Lithuania
  (bronze) Spain
  4th: Croatia
  5th: Slovenia
  6th: Ukraine
  7th: Serbia

=== FIBA World Championship for Women qualifiers ===
- 15–30 June: EuroBasket Women 2013 in France:
  1. Spain
  2. France
  3. Turkey
  4. Serbia
  5. Belarus
  6. Czech Republic
- 14–18 August: 2013 FIBA Oceania Championship for Women in Auckland, New Zealand and Canberra, Australia:
  1. Australia
- 20–29 September: 2013 FIBA Africa Championship for Women in Maputo, Mozambique:
  1. Angola
  2. Mozambique
- 21–28 September: 2013 FIBA Americas Championship for Women in Xalapa and Veracruz, Mexico:
  1. Cuba
  2. Canada
  3. Brazil
- 27 October–3 November: FIBA Asia Championship for Women in Bangkok, Thailand
  1. Japan
  2. South Korea
  3. China

=== Other tournaments ===
- 28 May–1 June: Games of the Small States of Europe in D'Coque, Luxembourg:
  - Men's tournament:
    1. Cyprus
    2. Luxembourg
    3. Iceland
  - Women's tournament:
    1. Luxembourg
    2. Iceland
    3. Cyprus
- 18–25 June: Mediterranean Games in Mersin, Turkey:
  1. Turkey
  2. Serbia
  3. Tunisia
- 2013 William Jones Cup in Taipei City, Taiwan
  - 6–15 July: Men's tournament:
    1. Iran
    2. Chinese Taipei
    3. South Korea
- 15–20 September: Islamic Solidarity Games in Palembang, Indonesia:
  - Men's tournament:
    1. Turkey
    2. Palestine
    3. Indonesia
  - Women's tournament:
    1. Indonesia
    2. Egypt
    3. Qatar
- 8–16 December: Southeast Asian Games in Naypidaw, Myanmar
  - Men's tournament:
    1. Philippines
    2. Thailand
    3. Singapore
  - Women's tournament:
    1. Thailand
    2. Philippines
    3. Malaysia

=== Youth tournaments ===
==== 2014 FIBA Under-17 World championship qualifiers ====
- 11–15 June: 2013 FIBA Americas Under-16 Championship for Men in Punta de Este, Uruguay:
  1. United States
  2. Argentina
  3. Canada
  4. Puerto Rico
- 28 June–7 July: 2013 FIBA Africa Under-16 Championship for Men in Antananarivo, Madagascar:
  1. Angola
  2. Egypt
- 8–18 August: 2013 FIBA Europe Under-16 Championship for Men in Sarajevo, Bosnia and Herzegovina:
  1. France
  2. Greece
  3. Italy
  4. Serbia
  5. Spain
- 25 September–4 October: 2013 FIBA Asia Under-16 Championship for Men in Tehran, Iran:
  1. China
  2. Philippines
  3. Japan
- 26–28 September: 2013 FIBA Oceania Under-16 Championship for Men in Melbourne, Australia:
  1. Australia

==== 2014 FIBA Under-17 World Championship for Women qualifiers ====
- 19–23 June: 2013 FIBA Americas Under-16 Championship for Women in Cancún, Mexico:
  1. United States
  2. Canada
  3. Brazil
  4. Mexico
- 1–11 August: 2013 FIBA Europe Under-16 Championship for Women in Varna and Albena, Bulgaria:
  1. Spain
  2. Czech Republic
  3. Hungary
  4. Italy
  5. France
- 26–28 September: 2013 FIBA Oceania Under-16 Championship for Women in Melbourne, Australia:
  1. Australia
- 5–12 October: 2013 FIBA Africa Under-16 Championship for Women in Maputo, Mozambique:
  1. Mali
  2. Egypt
- 23–30 November: 2013 FIBA Asia Under-16 Championship for Women in Colombo, Sri Lanka:
  1. China
  2. Japan
  3. South Korea

==== 2013 FIBA Europe youth championships ====
- 8–18 August: U-16 European Championship Men Division A in (Ukraine) Kyiv
- 8–18 August: U-16 European Championship Men Division B in (Bosnia and Herzegovina) Sarajevo
- 2–7 July: U-16 European Championship Men Division C in Gibraltar
- 18–28 July: U-18 European Championship Men Division A in (Latvia) Liepāja, Ventspils and Riga
- 18–28 July: U-18 European Championship Men Division B in (North Macedonia) Strumica
- 15–20 July: U-18 European Championship Men Division C in Andorra la Vella
- 9–21 July: U-20 European Championship Men Division A in (Estonia) Tallinn
- 12–21 July: U-20 European Championship Men Division B in (Romania) Pitești
- 1–11 August: U-16 European Championship Women Division A in (Bulgaria) Varna and Albena
- 1–11 August: U-16 European Championship Women Division B in (Portugal) Matosinhos
- 2–7 July: U-16 European Championship Women Division C in Gibraltar
- 15–25 August: U-18 European Championship Women Division A in (Croatia) Vukovar and Vinkovci
- 15–25 August: U-18 European Championship Women Division B in (Hungary) Miskolc
- 15–20 July: U-18 European Championship Women Division C in Andorra la Vella
- 4–14 July: U-20 European Championship Women Division A in (Turkey) Samsun
- 4–14 July: U-20 European Championship Women Division B in (Bulgaria) Albena

== Club championships ==
=== Continental championships ===
Men:

- FIBA Intercontinental Cup:
  - (gold) (Greece) Olympiacos (silver) (Brazil) EC Pinheiros
- Euroleague:
  - (gold) (Greece) Olympiacos (silver) (Spain) Real Madrid (bronze) (Russia) CSKA Moscow
    - Euroleague MVP and Euroleague Final Four MVP: (Greece) Vassilis Spanoulis, Olympiacos
    - Alphonso Ford Trophy (season's leading scorer): (United States) Bobby Brown, (Italy) Montepaschi Siena
- Eurocup:
  - (gold) (Russia) Lokomotiv-Kuban (silver) (Spain) Uxue Bilbao Basket (bronze) (Ukraine) Budivelnyk Kyiv, (Spain) Valencia
- EuroChallenge:
  - (gold) (Russia) Krasnye Krylia Samara (silver) (Turkey) Pınar Karşıyaka (bronze) (Germany) EWE Baskets Oldenburg
- FIBA Americas League:
  - (gold) (Brazil) EC Pinheiros (silver) (Argentina) Lanús (bronze) (Puerto Rico) Capitanes de Arecibo
- FIBA Asia Champions Cup:
  - (gold) (Iran) Foolad Mahan Isfahan (silver) (Qatar) Al Rayyan (bronze) (Jordan) ASU

Women:

- EuroLeague Women:
  - (gold) (Russia) UMMC Ekaterinburg (silver) (Turkey) Fenerbahçe (bronze) (France) Bourges Basket

=== Transnational championships ===
Men:

- (United States) (Canada) NBA
  - Season:
    - Division champions: New York Knicks (Atlantic), Indiana Pacers (Central), Miami Heat (Southeast), Oklahoma City Thunder (Northwest), Los Angeles Clippers (Pacific), San Antonio Spurs (Southwest)
    - Best regular-season record: Miami Heat (66–16)
    - Eastern Conference: Miami Heat
    - Western Conference: San Antonio Spurs
  - Finals: The Heat defend their title from last season, defeating the Spurs 4–3 in the best-of-7 series. LeBron James repeats as Finals MVP.
- (Australia) National Basketball League, 2012–13 season:
  - Premiers: New Zealand Breakers
  - Champions: The Breakers win their third straight championship, sweeping the Perth Wildcats 2–0 in the best-of-3 Grand Final.
- Adriatic League, 2012–13: (Serbia) Partizan Belgrade defeat (Serbia) Red Star Belgrade 71–63 in the one-off final.
- ASEAN Basketball League, 2013: (Philippines) San Miguel Beermen sweep the Indonesia Warriors 3–0 in the best-of-5 finals.
- Balkan League, 2012–13: (Israel) Hapoel Gilboa Galil defeat (Bulgaria) Levski Sofia 87-79 in the one-off final.
- Baltic League: (Latvia) Ventspils defeat (Lithuania) Prienai 161–150 on aggregate (91–69, 70–71) in the two-legged final.
- Czech League: (Czech Republic) Nymburk sweep (Czech Republic) Prostějov 4–0 in the best-of-7 final. This is Nymburk's 10th straight league title.
- VTB United League, 2012–13: (Russia) CSKA Moscow defeat (Russia) Lokomotiv-Kuban 3–1 in the best-of-5 final.

=== National championships ===
- (Argentina) Liga Nacional de Básquet, 2012–13:
  - Regular season championship Round: Regatas
  - Playoffs: Regatas sweep the Lanús 4-0 in the best-of-7 final.
- (Austria) Austrian Bundesliga: BC Vienna defeat Oberwart Gunners 3–2 in the best-of-5 finals.
- (Belarus) Belaruisan Premier League:BC Tsmoki-Minsk sweep BK Grodno-93 3–0 in the best-of-5 finals.
- Basketball League Belgium, 2012–13: Telenet Oostende sweep Belfius Mons-Hainaut 3–0 in the best-of-5 finals.
- Bosnia and Herzegovina Championship, 2012–13: KK Igokea defeat Široki WWin 3–2 in the best-of-5 finals.
- (Brazil) Novo Basquete Brasil, 2012–13: Flamengo defeat Uberlândia 77–70 in the final.
- (Bulgaria) Bulgarian National League: Lukoil Academic defeat Levski Sofia 3–2 in the best-of-5 final, claiming their 11th straight league title.
- (China) Chinese Basketball Association:
  - Regular season: Guangdong Southern Tigers
  - Playoffs: Guangdong Southern Tigers sweep the Shandong Lions 4–0 in the best-of-7 final.
- (Croatia) Croatian League, 2012–13: Cibona sweep Zadar 3–0 in the best-of-5 final.
- (Netherlands) Dutch Basketball League, 2012–13: ZZ Leiden sweep Aris Leeuwarden 4–0 in the best-of-7 final.
- (Estonia) Estonian League, 2012–13: Kalev/Cramo sweep TÜ/Rock 4–0 in the best-of-7 final.
- (France) French Pro A League, 2012–13: Nanterre defeat Strasbourg 3–1 in the best-of-5 final.
- (Germany) German Bundesliga, 2012–13: Brose Baskets sweep EWE Baskets Oldenburg 3–0 in the best-of-5 final, claiming their fourth consecutive title.
- (Greece) Greek League, 2012–13: Panathinaikos sweep Olympiacos 3–0 in the best-of-5 final.
- National Basketball League (Indonesia), 2012–13: Dell Aspac defeat Pelita Jaya Esia 63-50 in the one-off final.
- (Iran) Iranian Super League, 2012–13: Petrochimi defeat Mahram 3-2 in the best-of-5 final.
- (Israel) Israeli Super League, 2012–13: Maccabi Haifa defeat Maccabi Tel Aviv 86–79 in the one-off final.
- (Italy) Italian Serie A, 2012–13: Montepaschi Siena defeat Acea Roma 4–1 in the best-of-7 final, claiming their seventh straight title.
- Japan Basketball League, 2012–13: Toshiba Brave Thunders defeat the Aishin Sea Horses 3-2 in the best-of-5 final.
- (South Korea) Korean Basketball League, 2012–13: Ulsan Mobis Phoebus sweep the Seoul SK Knights 4-0 in the best-of-7 final.
- (Latvia) Latvian League, 2012–13: VEF Rīga defeat Ventspils 4–1 in the best-of-7 final.
- (Lithuania) Lithuanian LKL, 2012–13: Žalgiris sweep Lietuvos rytas 4–0 in the best-of-7 final.
- (Mexico) Mexican League, 2012–13: Toros de Los Dos Laredos defeat Halcones UV Xalapa 4–2 in the best-of-7 final.
- Montenegro League: Budućnost sweep the Sutjeska 3-0 in the best-of-5 final.
- (Philippines) Philippine Basketball Association, 2012–13:
  - Philippine Cup: The Talk 'N Text Tropang Texters sweep the Rain or Shine Elasto Painters 4–0 in the best-of-7 finals.
  - Commissioner's Cup: The Alaska Aces sweep Barangay Ginebra San Miguel 3–0 in the best-of-5 finals.
  - Governors' Cup: The San Mig Coffee Mixers defeat the Petron Blaze Boosters 4–3 in the best-of-7 finals.
- (Poland) Polish League, 2012–13: Stelemet Zielona Góra sweep PGE Turów 4–0 in the best-of-7 final.
- (Portugal) Portuguese League: Benfica defeat Académica de Coimbra 3-1 in the best-of-5 final.
- (Romania) Divizia A: CSU Asesoft Ploiești defeat Mureș 4–2 in the best-of-7 final.
- (Russia) Russian PBL, 2012–13: CSKA Moscow (regular-season play only; no playoffs)
- League of Serbia, 2012–13: Partizan Belgrade defeat Red Star Belgrade 3–1 in the best-of-5 final.
- (Slovenia) Slovenian League: Krka Novo Mesto defeat Union Olimpija Ljubljana i3–1 n the best-of-5 final.
- (Spain) Spanish ACB:
  - Season: Real Madrid
  - Playoffs: Real Madrid defeat FC Barcelona Regal 3–2 in the best-of-5 final.
- (Taiwan) Super Basketball League: Pure Youth defeat Dacin Tigers
- (Turkey) Turkish League, 2012–13: Galatasaray Medical Park defeat Banvit 4–1 in the best-of-7 final.
- (Ukraine) Ukrainian SuperLeague, 2012–13: Budivelnyk Kyiv defeat Azovmash Mariupol 4–3 in the best-of-7 final.
- (United Kingdom) British Basketball League, 2012–13:
  - Season: Leicester Riders
  - Playoffs: The Riders defeat the Newcastle Eagles 68–57 in the one-off final.

Women:

- (United States) WNBA
  - Season:
    - Eastern Conference: Atlanta Dream
    - Western Conference: Minnesota Lynx
  - Finals: The Lynx sweep the Dream 3–0 in the best-of-5 series, claiming their second title in three years. Maya Moore of the Lynx in named Finals MVP.

=== College seasons: Men's Division ===
| Nation | League / Tournament | Champion | Result | Runner-up | Playoff format |
|---|---|---|---|---|---|
| United States | NCAA Division I | Louisville Cardinals | 82–76 | Michigan Wolverines | One-game playoff |
| United States | 2013 National Invitation Tournament | Baylor Bears | 74–54 | Iowa Hawkeyes | One-game playoff |
| United States | 2013 College Basketball Invitational | Santa Clara Broncos | 2–1 | George Mason Patriots | Best-of-3 series |
| United States | 2013 CollegeInsider.com Postseason Tournament | East Carolina Pirates | 77–74 | Weber State Wildcats | One-game playoff |
| United States | NCAA Division II | Drury University | 74–73 | Metro State | One-game playoff |
| United States | NCAA Division III | Amherst College | 87–70 | Mary Hardin–Baylor | One-game playoff |
| United States | NAIA Division I | Georgetown (KY) | 88–62 | SAGU (TX) | One-game playoff |
| United States | NAIA Division II | Cardinal Stritch (WI) | 73–59 | William Penn (IA) | One-game playoff |
| United States | NJCAA Division I | College of Central Florida | 74–69 | Northwest Florida State College | One-game playoff |
| United States | NJCAA Division II | Rend Lake College | 87–69 | Moraine Valley Community College | One-game playoff |
| United States | NJCAA Division III | Brookdale Community College | 61–55 | Eastfield College | One-game playoff |
| Philippines | UAAP Season 76 | De La Salle Green Archers | 2–1 | UST Growling Tigers | Best-of-3 series |
| Philippines | NCAA Season 89 | San Beda Red Lions | 2–1 | Letran Knights | Best-of-3 series |
| Philippines | Philippine Collegiate Champions League | De La Salle Green Archers | 2–0 | SWU Cobras | Best-of-3 series |

Women

- (United States) NCAA
  - Division I: Connecticut 93, Louisville 60
    - Most Outstanding Player: Breanna Stewart, Connecticut
  - WNIT: Drexel 46, Utah 43
  - Women's Basketball Invitational: Detroit 73, McNeese State 62
  - Division II: Ashland 71, Dowling 56
  - Division III: DePauw 69, Wisconsin–Whitewater 51
- (United States) NAIA
  - NAIA Division I: Westmont College 71, Lee University 65
  - NAIA Division II: Indiana Wesleyan 61, Davenport 43
- (United States) NJCAA
  - Division I: Trinity Valley 83, Central Arizona 71
  - Division II: Louisburg 75, Mesa 65
  - Division III: Rock Valley 78, Mohawk Valley 60
- (Philippines) UAAP Women's: La Salle defeated NU 2–1 in the best-of-3 finals.

=== Prep ===
- (United States) USA Today Boys Basketball Ranking #1:
- (United States) USA Today Girls Basketball Ranking #1:
- NCAA (Philippines) Juniors: San Beda defeated LSGH in 2 games in the finals en route to winning all 20 games of the season.
- (Philippines) UAAP Juniors: NU defeated Ateneo in 2 games in the finals en route to winning all 18 games of the season.

== Awards and honors ==
=== Naismith Memorial Basketball Hall of Fame ===
- Class of 2013:
  - Players: Roger Brown, Richie Guerin, Bernard King, Gary Payton, Oscar Schmidt, Dawn Staley
  - Coaches: Sylvia Hatchell, Guy Lewis, Rick Pitino, Jerry Tarkanian
  - Contributors: Russ Granik, Edwin Bancroft Henderson

=== Women's Basketball Hall of Fame ===
- Class of 2012
  - Gary Blair
  - Jim Foster
  - Peggie Gillom-Granderson
  - Jennifer Rizzotti
  - Annette Smith-Knight
  - Sue Wicks

=== FIBA Hall of Fame ===
- Class of 2013:
  - Players: Jean-Jacques Conceiçao, Teresa Edwards, Andrew Gaze, Paula Gonçalves, David Robinson, Zoran Slavnić
  - Coaches: Jack Donohue, Cesare Rubini, Pat Summitt
  - Technical officials: Valentin Lazarov, Costas Rigas
  - Contributors: Aldo Vitale

=== Professional ===
- Men
  - NBA Most Valuable Player Award: LeBron James, Miami Heat
  - NBA Rookie of the Year Award: Damian Lillard, Portland Trail Blazers
  - NBA Defensive Player of the Year Award: Marc Gasol, Memphis Grizzlies
  - NBA Sixth Man of the Year Award: J. R. Smith, New York Knicks
  - NBA Most Improved Player Award: Paul George, Indiana Pacers
  - NBA Sportsmanship Award: Jason Kidd, New York Knicks
  - NBA Coach of the Year Award: George Karl, Denver Nuggets
  - J. Walter Kennedy Citizenship Award: Kenneth Faried, Denver Nuggets
  - Twyman–Stokes Teammate of the Year Award: Chauncey Billups, Los Angeles Clippers
  - NBA Executive of the Year Award: Masai Ujiri, Denver Nuggets
  - FIBA Europe Player of the Year Award:
  - Euroscar Award:
  - Mr. Europa:
- Women
  - WNBA Most Valuable Player Award: Candace Parker, Los Angeles Sparks
  - WNBA Defensive Player of the Year Award: Tamika Catchings, Indiana Fever
  - WNBA Rookie of the Year Award: Elena Delle Donne, Chicago Sky
  - WNBA Sixth Woman of the Year Award: Sylvia Fowles, Chicago Sky
  - WNBA Most Improved Player Award: Shavonte Zellous, Indiana Fever
  - Kim Perrot Sportsmanship Award: Swin Cash, Chicago Sky & Tamika Catchings, Indiana Fever
  - WNBA Coach of the Year Award: Mike Thibault, Washington Mystics
  - WNBA All-Star Game MVP: Candace Parker, Los Angeles Sparks
  - FIBA Europe Player of the Year Award
  - WNBA Finals Most Valuable Player Award: Maya Moore, Minnesota Lynx

=== Collegiate ===
- Combined
  - Legends of Coaching Award: Bill Self, Kansas
- Men
  - John R. Wooden Award: Trey Burke, Michigan
  - Naismith College Coach of the Year: Jim Larrañaga, Miami (FL)
  - Frances Pomeroy Naismith Award: Peyton Siva, Louisville
  - Associated Press College Basketball Player of the Year: Trey Burke, Michigan
  - NCAA basketball tournament Most Outstanding Player: Shabazz Napier, Connecticut
  - USBWA National Freshman of the Year: Marcus Smart, Oklahoma State
  - Associated Press College Basketball Coach of the Year: Jim Larrañaga, Miami
  - Naismith Outstanding Contribution to Basketball: Lute Olson
- Women
  - John R. Wooden Award: Brittney Griner, Baylor
  - Naismith College Player of the Year: Brittney Griner, Baylor
  - Naismith College Coach of the Year: Muffet McGraw, Notre Dame
  - Wade Trophy: Brittney Griner, Baylor
  - Frances Pomeroy Naismith Award: Alex Bentley, Penn State
  - Associated Press Women's College Basketball Player of the Year: Brittney Griner, Baylor
  - NCAA basketball tournament Most Outstanding Player: Breanna Stewart, UConn
  - Basketball Academic All-America Team: Elena Delle Donne, Delaware
  - Kay Yow Award: Sue Semrau, Florida State
  - Carol Eckman Award: Jan Ross, Oklahoma
  - Maggie Dixon Award: Holly Warlick, Tennessee
  - USBWA National Freshman of the Year: Jewell Loyd, Notre Dame
  - Associated Press College Basketball Coach of the Year: Muffet McGraw, Notre Dame
  - List of Senior CLASS Award women's basketball winners: Elena Delle Donne, Delaware
  - Nancy Lieberman Award: Skylar Diggins, Notre Dame
  - Naismith Outstanding Contribution to Basketball: Pat Summitt

== Events ==
- January 21 – The Maloof family announces that it has reached an agreement to sell the Sacramento Kings to a Seattle-based group led by Chris Hansen and Steve Ballmer that plans to move the team to Seattle for the 2013–14 season and resurrect the SuperSonics name.
- April 15 – The 2013 WNBA draft is held at the ESPN studios in Bristol, Connecticut, with Baylor center Brittney Griner chosen first overall.
- April 29 – After Sacramento mayor and former NBA player Kevin Johnson recruits an ownership group to make a counter-offer to keep the Kings in Sacramento, a league committee unanimously recommends that owners reject the Seattle group's deal.
- May 31 – The sale of the Kings to the Sacramento-based group led by Vivek Ranadive is closed.
- June 27 – The 2013 NBA draft is held at the Barclays Center in Brooklyn, with Anthony Bennett, a power forward from UNLV, becoming the first Canadian to be chosen as the first overall pick.
- December 6 – In the highest-scoring game in NCAA Division I women's history, Kentucky defeats Baylor 133–130 in four overtimes. The game, held at AT&T Stadium in Arlington, Texas, was the front end of a doubleheader that included the two schools' men's teams.

== Movies ==
- Long Shot: The Kevin Laue Story
- Medora

== Deaths ==
- January 7 — Gonzalo Puyat II, former president of FIBA (born 1934)
- January 10 — Jay Handlan, College All-American (Washington and Lee) and AAU player (born 1928)
- January 12 — Chuck Dalton, Canadian Olympic player (1952) (born 1927)
- January 15 — George Gund III, NBA owner (Cleveland Cavaliers) (born 1937)
- January 16 — Wayne D. Anderson, American college coach (Idaho) (born 1930)
- January 19 — Jim Marking, American college coach (South Dakota State) (born 1927)
- January 24 — Jim Line, two-time NCAA championship player at Kentucky (1948, 1949) (born 1926)
- January 31 — Larry Killick, 10th overall selection in the 1947 BAA draft (born 1922)
- February 3 — B. H. Born, 1953 NCAA Tournament Most Outstanding Player (Kansas), AAU player (born 1932)
- February 7 — Howard Lassoff, American player (Maccabi Tel Aviv) (born 1955)
- February 11 — Jim Boatwright, American player (Maccabi Tel Aviv) (born 1951)
- February 11 — Matthew White, American player known for his collegiate career (University of Pennsylvania) (born 1957)
- February 13 — Harry Miller, 86, American college coach (Fresno State, Eastern New Mexico, Wichita State, Stephen F. Austin).
- February 13 — Tibor Zsíros, Hungarian Olympic player (1948, 1952) (born 1930)
- February 17 — Phil Henderson, three-time Final Four player at Duke (born 1968)
- February 18 — Jerry Buss, Los Angeles Lakers owner and member of the Naismith Memorial Basketball Hall of Fame (born 1933)
- March 2 — Giorgos Kolokithas, Greek player (Panathinaikos B.C.) (born 1945)
- March 3 — Bart Quinn, American NBL player (Fort Wayne General Electrics) (born 1917)
- March 3 — George Wearring, Canadian Olympic player (1952) (born 1928)
- March 4 — Chick Halbert, American BBA player (born 1919)
- March 5 — Calvin Fowler, ABA player (Carolina Cougars) and 1968 Olympic Gold Medalist (born 1940)
- March 7 — Harold Hunter, College coach (NC Central), first African-American to sign an NBA contract (born 1926)
- March 8 — Mickey Marty, 91, All-American college player (Loras).
- March 14 — Jack Curran, American high school coach (Archbishop Molloy High School) (born 1930)
- March 22 — Ray Williams, NBA player (New York Knicks, among others) (born 1954)
- March 26 — Tom Boerwinkle, NBA player (Chicago Bulls) (born 1945)
- March 30 — Bob Nichols, 82, American college coach (Toledo).
- March 30 — Bobby Parks, American player (San Miguel, Shell, Aspac Jakarta) (born 1962)
- April 1 — Greg Willard, NBA referee (born 1958)
- April 7 — Marty Blake, NBA GM (Atlanta Hawks and scout (born 1927)
- April 12 — Marv Harshman, Naismith Hall of Fame college coach (Washington State, Washington) (born 1917)
- April 24 — Murray Satterfield, 87, American college coach (Boise State, College of Idaho)
- May 5 — Jack Turner, NBA player (Chicago Packers) (born 1939)
- May 16 — Carl Bennett, NBA coach and GM (Fort Wayne Pistons) (born 1915)
- May 23 — Flynn Robinson, NBA player (born 1941)
- May 29 — Cliff Meely, NBA player (Houston Rockets, Los Angeles Lakers) (born 1947)
- June 4 — Monti Davis, NBA player (Philadelphia 76ers, Dallas Mavericks) (born 1958)
- June 7 — Charlie Coles, College coach (Central Michigan, Miami of Ohio) (born 1942)
- June 19 — Ólafur Rafnsson, Icelandic president of FIBA Europe (born 1963)
- July 6 — Rudy Keeling, College coach (Maine, Northeastern) (born 1947)
- July 6 — Leland Mitchell, ABA player (New Orleans Buccaneers) (born 1941)
- July 14 — Simmie Hill, ABA player (born 1946)
- July 23 — Red McManus, college coach (Creighton) (born 1925)
- July 30 — Ossie Schectman, BAA player (New York Knicks) (born 1919)
- August 2 — George Hauptfuhrer, third overall pick in the 1948 BAA draft (born 1926)
- August 5 — Roy Rubin, NBA (Philadelphia 76ers) and college (Long Island) coach (born 1925)
- August 14 — Jack Garfinkel, BAA player (Boston Celtics) (born 1918)
- August 17 — Devin Gray, NBA player (Sacramento Kings, San Antonio Spurs, Houston Rockets) (born 1972)
- August 23 — Dean Meminger, NBA player (New York Knicks) (born 1948)
- August 30 — Howie Crittenden, college (Murray State) and AAU (Peoria Cats) player (born 1933)
- September 3 — Don Meineke, NBA player (Fort Wayne Pistons, Cincinnati Royals) (born 1930)
- September 7 — Zelmo Beaty, NBA/ABA player (St. Louis Hawks, Utah Stars, Los Angeles Lakers) (born 1939)
- September 16 — Jim Palmer, NBA player (Cincinnati Royals, New York Knicks) (born 1933)
- September 17 — Dick O'Neal, All-American college player (TCU) (born 1935)
- September 29 — Bob Kurland, Hall of Fame college (Oklahoma State) and AAU (Phillips 66ers) player (born 1924)
- October 3 — Sergei Belov, Russian Olympic gold medalist (1972) (born 1944)
- October 13 — Joe Meriweather, NBA player (Kansas City Kings, among others) (born 1953)
- October 23 — Wes Bialosuknia, ABA player (Oakland Oaks) (born 1945)
- October 25 — Bill Sharman, Hall of Fame player and coach (born 1926)
- October 25 — Chico Vaughn, NBA and ABA player (St. Louis Hawks, Detroit Pistons, Pittsburgh Pipers) (born 1940)
- November 2 — Walt Bellamy, Hall of Fame player and 1960 Olympic Gold medalist (born 1939)
- November 7 — Ian Davies, Australian player (Sydney Kings) and Olympian (born 1956)
- November 7 — Lenny Rzeszewski, American college basketball player (Indiana State) (born 1923)
- November 17 — Joe Dean, Collegiate basketball Hall of Fame player, administrator (LSU) (born 1930)
- November 21 — Vern Mikkelsen, Hall of Fame player (Minneapolis Lakers) (born 1928)
- November 29 — Valdis Muižnieks, Latvian player who won three Olympic silver medals as a part of the Soviet Union national team (born 1935)
- December 6 — M. K. Turk, college coach (Southern Miss) (born 1942)
- December 15 — Dyron Nix, NBA player (Indiana Pacers) (born 1967)
- December 18 — Harry Boland, Irish Olympic player (born 1925)
- December 29 — Connie Dierking, NBA player (Cincinnati Royals, Philadelphia 76ers) (born 1936)
- December 29 — Khushi Ram, Indian player (born 1936)
- December 31 — Johnny Orr, NBA player and college coach (Michigan, Iowa State) (born 1927)
- December 31 — Art Stolkey, BAA player (Detroit Falcons) (born 1920)

== See also ==
- Timeline of women's basketball
