= 2020 FIBA Under-17 Basketball World Cup =

Tournament details
- Host country: Bulgaria
- Teams: 16 (from 5 confederations)
- Venue: 1 (in 1 host city)

Official website
- www.fiba.basketball

The 2020 FIBA Under-17 Basketball World Cup (Bulgarian: 2020 Световна купа по баскетбол FIBA до 17 години) would have been the 6th edition of the FIBA Under-17 Basketball World Cup, the biennial international men's youth basketball championship contested by the U17 national teams of the member associations of FIBA.

It was originally scheduled to take place between 4 and 12 July 2020, and hosted by Sofia, Bulgaria. However, due to the COVID-19 pandemic, it was postponed to 15 to 23 August. On 12 June 2020, FIBA postponed the tournament again and options were examined to play in 2021, but the tournament was eventually cancelled.

== Venues ==
Sofia	2020 FIBA Under-17 Basketball World Cup is located in Bulgaria
Armeets Arena	2020 FIBA Under-17 Basketball World Cup is located in Bulgaria
Capacity: 12,373	2020 FIBA Under-17 Basketball World Cup is located in Bulgaria

== Qualified teams ==
Means of Qualification	Date	Venue	Berths	Qualifiers
Host Nation	4 April 2019		1	Bulgaria
2019 FIBA Under-16 Americas Championship	3–9 June 2019	(Brazil) Belém do Pará	4	United States; Canada; Dominican Republic; Argentina
2019 FIBA Under-16 African Championship	5–14 July 2019	(Cape Verde) Praia	2	Egypt; Mali
2019 FIBA Under-16 European Championship	9–17 August 2019	(Italy) Udine	5	Spain; France; Italy; Russia; Turkey
Asian selection			4	Australia; China; South Korea; Cancelled
Total			16	

As the Asian tournament was cancelled, the FIBA used the World rankings to decide the participants. Japan and New Zealand were to play a play-off to decide the last participant as they are equal on points.

== Draw ==
The draw for the tournament was held on 6 March 2020 in Sofia, Bulgaria.

=== Seedings ===
The seedings were announced on 6 March 2020.

Pot 1	Pot 2	Pot 3	Pot 4
Bulgaria (hosts); United States; Canada; Spain	France; Italy; Russia; Turkey	Australia; China; South Korea; Japan or New Zealand	Dominican Republic; Argentina; Egypt; Mali

== Preliminary round ==
=== Group A ===
Pos	Team	Pld	W	L	PF	PA	PD	Pts
1	Canada	0	0	0	0	0	0	0
2	Australia	0	0	0	0	0	0	0
3	Italy	0	0	0	0	0	0	0
4	Egypt	0	0	0	0	0	0	0

Source: FIBA
Rules for classification: 1) Points; 2) Head-to-head results; 3) Points difference; 4) Points scored.

=== Group B ===
Pos	Team	Pld	W	L	PF	PA	PD	Pts
1	China	0	0	0	0	0	0	0
2	Dominican Republic	0	0	0	0	0	0	0
3	France	0	0	0	0	0	0	0
4	Bulgaria (H)	0	0	0	0	0	0	0

Source: FIBA
Rules for classification: 1) Points; 2) Head-to-head results; 3) Points difference; 4) Points scored.
(H) Hosts

=== Group C ===
Pos	Team	Pld	W	L	PF	PA	PD	Pts
1	Turkey	0	0	0	0	0	0	0
2	South Korea	0	0	0	0	0	0	0
3	Argentina	0	0	0	0	0	0	0
4	Spain	0	0	0	0	0	0	0

Source: FIBA
Rules for classification: 1) Points; 2) Head-to-head results; 3) Points difference; 4) Points scored.

=== Group D ===
Pos	Team	Pld	W	L	PF	PA	PD	Pts
1	Russia	0	0	0	0	0	0	0
2	United States	0	0	0	0	0	0	0
3	Mali	0	0	0	0	0	0	0
4	Cancelled	0	0	0	0	0	0	0

Source: FIBA
Rules for classification: 1) Points; 2) Head-to-head results; 3) Points difference; 4) Points scored.

== Final round ==
=== Bracket ===
Round of 16
A1
B4
C2
D3
A3
B2
C4
D1
A2
B3
C1
D4
A4
B1
C3
D2

Quarter-finals

Semi-finals

Final
Third place

=== 9–16th classification playoffs ===
Classification quarterfinals

Classification semifinals

Ninth place match
Eleventh place match

Classification semifinals

13th place match
15th place match

=== 5–8th classification playoffs ===
Classification semifinals

Fifth place match
Seventh place match

== Final ranking ==
Rank	Team	Record
Gold medal		
Silver medal		
Bronze medal		
4th		
5th		
6th		
7th		
8th		
9th		
10th		
11th		
12th		
13th		
14th		
15th		
16th		
