= Gabon men's national under-16 basketball team =

Gabon
- FIBA zone: FIBA Africa
- National federation: Fédération Gabonaise de Basket-Ball

U17 World Cup
- Appearances: None

U16 AfroBasket
- Appearances: 2
- Medals: None

The Gabon men's national under-16 basketball team is a national basketball team of Gabon, administered by the Fédération Gabonaise de Basket-Ball. It represents the country in men's international under-16 basketball competitions.

== FIBA U16 AfroBasket participations ==
Year	Result
2013	7th
2021	7th

== See also ==
- Gabon men's national basketball team
- Gabon men's national under-18 basketball team
- Gabon women's national under-16 basketball team
