= Nigeria men's national under-17 basketball team =

Nigeria
- FIBA zone: FIBA Africa
- National federation: Nigeria Basketball Federation

U17 World Cup
- Appearances: None

U16 AfroBasket
- Appearances: 3
- Medals: (bronze) Bronze: 2 (2009, 2019)

The Nigeria men's national under-16 basketball team is a national basketball team of Nigeria, administered by the Nigeria Basketball Federation. It represents the country in men's international under-16 basketball competitions.

== FIBA U16 AfroBasket participations ==
Year	Result
2009	3rd place, bronze medalist(s)
2015	5th
2019	3rd place, bronze medalist(s)

== See also ==
- Nigeria men's national basketball team
- Nigeria men's national under-19 basketball team
- Nigeria women's national under-17 basketball team
