= Chad men's national under-16 basketball team =

Chad
- FIBA zone: FIBA Africa
- National federation: Fédération Tchadienne de Basketball

U17 World Cup
- Appearances: None

U16 AfroBasket
- Appearances: 2
- Medals: None

The Chad men's national under-16 basketball team is a national basketball team of Chad, administered by the Fédération Tchadienne de Basketball. It represents the country in men's international under-16 basketball competitions.

== FIBA U16 AfroBasket participations ==
| Year | Result |
|---|---|
| 2021 | 4th |
| 2023 | 7th |

== See also ==
- Chad men's national basketball team
