= Mozambique men's national under-16 basketball team =

Mozambican basketball team

Mozambique
- Joined FIBA: 1978
- FIBA zone: FIBA Africa
- National federation: Federação Moçambicana de Basquetebol
- Coach: João Mulungo

U17 World Cup
- Appearances: None

U16 AfroBasket
- Appearances: 4
- Medals: None

The Mozambique men's national under-16 basketball team is a national basketball team of Mozambique, administered by the Federação Moçambicana de Basquetebol. It represents the country in men's international under-16 basketball competitions.

== FIBA U16 AfroBasket participations ==
Year	Result
2009	5th
2011	6th
2013	6th
2017	7th

== Roster (2017) ==
Mozambique U-16 Basketball Team - 2017 FIBA Africa Championship roster
Players
Coaches

Pos.	No.	Name	Age – Date of birth	Height	Club	Ctr.
	4	Daniel Chaúque	16 – 24 April 2001		Desportivo de Maputo	(Mozambique)
	5	Edilson Ussivane	16 – 20 May 2001		Costa do Sol	(Mozambique)
PF	6	Nelson Nhamussua (C)	17 – 31 January 2000		Clube de Desportos da Apolitécnica	(Mozambique)
	7	Clayton Clemente	16 – 22 March 2001		Clube de Desportos da Apolitécnica	(Mozambique)
	8	Bryan Ricotso	15 – 30 June 2002		Ferroviário de Maputo	(Mozambique)
C	9	Ndengo Buvana	16 – 12 April 2001		Ferroviário da Beira	(Mozambique)
	10	Ângelo Macie Jr.	16 – 7 March 2001		Ferroviário de Maputo	(Mozambique)
SG	11	Caprinizine Hunguana Jr.	15 – 28 January 2002		Maxaquene	(Mozambique)
	12	Daren Naiene	15 – 29 April 2002		Maxaquene	(Mozambique)
	13	Malik Camal	16 – 11 May 2001		Maxaquene	(Mozambique)
C	14	Mucombo Magagule	15 – 11 March 2002		Ferroviário de Maputo	(Mozambique)
	15	Herman Cumbe	16 – 15 March 2001		Desportivo de Maputo	(Mozambique)

Head coach

- João Mulungo

Assistant coach(es)

- Joseba Martin Garcia

Physio

Legend

- (C) Team captain
- nat field describes country

=== Head coach position ===
- (Mozambique) João Mulungo

== See also ==
- Mozambique men's national basketball team
- Mozambique women's national under-16 basketball team
