= Assémian Moularé =

Ivorian-French basketball player (born 2003)

No. 3 – JL Bourg
- Position: Point guard / shooting guard
- League: LNB Élite; EuroCup

Personal information
- Born: 21 January 2003 (age 23) Paris, France
- Listed height: 6 ft 0 in (1.83 m)
- Listed weight: 195 lb (88 kg)

Career information
- Playing career: 2020–present

Career history
- 2020–2022: Metropolitans 92
- 2022–2025: Vichy-Clermont
- 2025–present: JL Bourg

Career highlights
- EuroCup champion (2026)

Assémian Moularé (born 21 January 2003) is an Ivorian-French professional basketball player for JL Bourg of the LNB Pro A and the EuroCup. Born in France, he represents Ivory Coast internationally.

== Professional career ==
=== Metropolitans 92 (2020–2022) ===
In the 2020–21 season, Moularé gained his first professional experience with the Metropolitans 92 senior team in the LNB Pro A, receiving limited playing time in three games. He made his professional debut on 19 December 2020, recording one assist and one rebound in two minutes of play during a win over Boulazac Basket Dordogne. Moularé also played for the team's club in LNB Espoirs, the French under-21 league, and averaged 13.5 points, 3.1 assists, and 3.3 rebounds per game.

In 12 league games in 2021–22, Moularé averaged 1.1 points per contest in his limited role. He played in seven EuroCup games as well, averaging 1.9 points, while helping the team reach the quarterfinals. Additionally, Moularé averaged 12.5 points, 4.6 assists, and 4.4 rebounds in his final year of LNB Espoirs competition.

=== Vichy-Clermont (2022–2025) ===
On 21 June 2022, Moularé signed with Vichy-Clermont of the second-tier LNB Pro B on a two-year deal – his first professional contract.

Moularé entered his name into the 2023 NBA draft.

=== JL Bourg (2025–present) ===
On April 23, 2025, he signed a three-year contract with JL Bourg of the LNB Pro A, joining the team after the season ended.

== National team career ==
=== Junior national team ===
Moularé represented the Ivory Coast for the first time by playing for the Ivory Coast men's national under-16 basketball team at the 2019 FIBA Under-16 African Championship held in Cape Verde. He finished as the top scorer of the tournament, averaging 20.8 points, 5.8 rebounds, and 2.8 assists in five games. Ivory Coast finished in ninth place.

=== Senior national team ===
Moularé made his debut for the senior national team in February 2021 during AfroBasket 2021 qualification. He appeared in three contests and averaged 3.3 points per game, including a 10-point performance against Equatorial Guinea. Ivory Coast finished the qualifying phase with an undefeated record. Moularé was named to Ivory Coast's preliminary squad for Afrobasket 2021, but was not selected to the final squad.

Moularé was called up for the first window of 2023 FIBA World Cup African qualifiers in November 2021; he was the youngest member of the squad. In their second game, Moularé recorded a game-high 20 points, seven rebounds, three assists, two steals, and one block in 19 minutes to lead his team to a 92–64 victory over the Central African Republic. Moularé was called up again ahead of the next window of qualifiers in July 2022. He was named the Man of the Match after recording 25 points, five rebounds, three assists, and one steal in a 75–73 victory over Angola. Moularé was chosen as Man of the Match again two games later as Ivory Coast defeated Guinea, 65–56, to finish first in their group and qualify to the next round.

In August 2023, Moularé was named to the 12-man roster for the 2023 FIBA Basketball World Cup.

== Personal life ==
Moularé was born in Paris to a Ghanaian-Ivorian father and a Tunisian-Guadeloupean mother.
