= Senegal men's national under-16 basketball team =

Senegal
- FIBA zone: FIBA Africa

World Championships
- Appearances: None

African Championships
- Appearances: None

The Senegal national under-16 basketball team is a national basketball team of Senegal, governed by the Fédération Sénégalaise de Basket-Ball. It represents the country in international under-16 (under age 16) basketball competitions.

The team appeared at the 2009 FIBA Africa Under-16 Championship qualification stage.

== See also ==
- Senegal men's national basketball team
- Senegal men's national under-19 basketball team
- Senegal women's national under-16 basketball team
