= Guinea-Bissau women's national under-16 basketball team =

Guinea-Bissau
- FIBA zone: FIBA Africa

World Championships
- Appearances: None

African Championships
- Appearances: None

The Guinea-Bissau women's national under-16 and under-17 basketball team is a national basketball team of Guinea-Bissau, administered by the Federacao de Basquetebol da Guinée Bissau. It represents the country in international women's under-16 and under-17 (under age 16 and under age 17) basketball competitions.

It appeared at the 2008 FIBA Africa U16 Zonal Championship for Women.

== See also ==
- Guinea-Bissau women's national basketball team
- Guinea-Bissau women's national under-19 basketball team
- Guinea-Bissau men's national under-16 basketball team
