= Algeria men's national under-16 basketball team =

Youth national basketball team

Algeria
- Joined FIBA: 1963
- FIBA zone: FIBA Africa
- National federation: Algerian Basketball Federation

U17 World Cup
- Appearances: None

U16 AfroBasket
- Appearances: 6
- Medals: (bronze) Bronze: 3 (2015, 2017, 2021)

The Algeria men's national under-16 basketball team is the boys' national basketball team of Algeria, governed by Algerian Basketball Federation. It represents the country in international under-16 men's basketball competitions.

== FIBA U16 AfroBasket participations ==
Year	Result
2009	4th
2011	5th
2015	3rd place, bronze medalist(s)
2017	3rd place, bronze medalist(s)
2019	10th
2021	3rd place, bronze medalist(s)

== See also ==
- Algeria men's national basketball team
- Algeria men's national under-18 basketball team
- Algeria women's national under-16 basketball team
