= 2019 FIBA U16 African Championship =

2019 FIBA U16 AfroBasket
6th FIBA Under-16 African Basketball Championship

Tournament details
- Host country: Cape Verde
- Dates: July 5–14
- Teams: 7 (from 1 confederation)
- Venue(s): 1 (in 1 host city)

Final positions
- Champions: Egypt (4th title)

Official website
- www.fiba.basketball

The 2019 FIBA Africa Under-16 Championship, alternatively the 6th Afrobasket U16, was an international basketball competition held in Praia, Cape Verde from 5–14 July 2019. It served as a qualifier for the 2020 FIBA Under-17 Basketball World Cup in Bulgaria.

== Venue ==
Praia	2019 FIBA U16 African Championship is located in Cape Verde
Gimnodesportivo Vavá Duarte (Capacity: 8,000)	2019 FIBA U16 African Championship is located in Cape Verde

== Participating teams ==
On the eve of the tournament, rosters were finalized for the following participating teams:

- Cape Verde
- Algeria
- Ivory Coast
- Egypt
- Guinea
- Mali
- Tunisia

== Group phase ==
All times are local Cape Verde Time (UTC-1:00).

=== Group A ===
Pos	Team	Pld	W	L	PF	PA	PD	Pts	Qualification
1	Egypt	4	4	0	323	232	+91	8	Advance to Quarterfinals
2	Nigeria	4	3	1	306	246	+60	7	Advance to Quarterfinals
3	Angola	4	2	2	260	285	−25	6	Advance to Quarterfinals
4	Cape Verde (H)	4	1	3	191	257	−66	5	Advance to Quarterfinals
5	Algeria	4	0	4	216	276	−60	4	Advance to Classification 9–10

Source: FIBA Africa
(H) Hosts

5 July
19:30

Box Score

Algeria	48–53	Cape Verde
Scoring by quarter: 17–10, 16–15, 12–13, 3–15
Pts: Nessaibia 12; Rebs: Aouana 12; Asts: Yahya 3		Pts: Silva, Buccilli 17; Rebs: Silva 12; Asts: Monteiro 4

Gimnodesportivo Vavá Duarte, Praia

6 July
19:30

Box Score

Nigeria	77–86	Egypt
Scoring by quarter: 21–13, 13–24, 21–30, 22–19
Pts: Isah 23; Rebs: Chinyelu 11; Asts: Dennis, Chinyelu 3		Pts: Abouzeid 30; Rebs: Elshakery 12; Asts: three players 2

Gimnodesportivo Vavá Duarte, Praia

7 July
17:15

Box Score

Egypt	86–61	Angola
Scoring by quarter: 19–15, 15–21, 28–16, 24–9
Pts: Abouzeid 23; Rebs: Ahmed 22; Asts: Abouzeid 4		Pts: Andrade 12; Rebs: Andrade, Texeira 6 Asts: Antonio 3

Gimnodesportivo Vavá Duarte, Praia

7 July
19:30

Box Score

Cape Verde	39–64	Nigeria
Scoring by quarter: 13–11, 7–20, 11–16, 8–17
Pts: Martins, Silva 10; Rebs: Silva 10; Asts: Buccilli 2		Pts: Chinyelu 20; Rebs: Chinyelu 21; Asts: Okpara 3

Gimnodesportivo Vavá Duarte, Praia

8 July
15:00

Box Score

Algeria	53–73	Angola
Scoring by quarter: 16–10, 14–29, 13–14, 10–20
Pts: Ammad, Yahya 15; Rebs: Aouana 13; Asts: four players 1		Pts: Antonio 20; Rebs: Texeira 16; Asts: Antonio, Avelino 3

Gimnodesportivo Vavá Duarte, Praia

8 July
19:30

Box Score

Cape Verde	43–76	Egypt
Scoring by quarter: 4–22, 14–13, 18–16, 7–25
Pts: Delgado, Buccilli 8 Rebs: Monteiro 7 Asts: Silva 2		Pts: Rehan 23; Rebs: three players 8 Asts: Mohamed 2

Gimnodesportivo Vavá Duarte, Praia

9 July
17:15

Box Score

Egypt	75–51	Algeria
Scoring by quarter: 11–7, 24–16, 18–11, 22–17
Pts: Abouzeid 13; Rebs: Abouseria, Elshakery 11; Asts: three players 2		Pts: Ammad 17; Rebs: Aouana 11; Asts: Zidouni 6

Gimnodesportivo Vavá Duarte, Praia

9 July
19:30

Box Score

Angola	57–90	Nigeria
Scoring by quarter: 11–20, 12–26, 19–22, 15–22
Pts: Avelino 14; Rebs: Antonio 8 Asts: Antonio, Andrade 1		Pts: Isah 27; Rebs: Chinyelu 24; Asts: Dennis 5

Gimnodesportivo Vavá Duarte, Praia

10 July
15:00

Box Score

Nigeria	75–64	Algeria
Scoring by quarter: 24–12, 15–11, 16–19, 20–22
Pts: Okemirie 19; Rebs: Okemirie 18; Asts: Okpara, Dennis 5		Pts: Nessaibia 18; Rebs: Aouana 11; Asts: Ammad 3

Gimnodesportivo Vavá Duarte, Praia

10 July
19:30

Box Score

Angola	69–56	Cape Verde
Scoring by quarter: 19–16, 21–18, 15–13, 14–9
Pts: Antonio 22; Rebs: Texeira 16; Asts: Soares 4		Pts: Silva 25; Rebs: Cabral 10; Asts: Delgado 6

Gimnodesportivo Vavá Duarte, Praia

=== Group B ===
Pos	Team	Pld	W	L	PF	PA	PD	Pts	Qualification
1	Mali	4	4	0	250	202	+48	8	Advance to Quarterfinals
2	Guinea	4	3	1	229	211	+18	7	Advance to Quarterfinals
3	Tunisia	4	2	2	261	255	+6	6	Advance to Quarterfinals
4	Rwanda	4	1	3	224	281	−57	5	Advance to Quarterfinals
5	Ivory Coast	4	0	4	226	241	−15	4	Advance to Classification 9–10

Source: FIBA Africa

5 July
17:15

Box Score

Mali	61–57	Tunisia
Scoring by quarter: 12–16, 22–7, 13–13, 14–21
Pts: Singare 13; Rebs: Dembélé 9 Asts: Singare, Sinayoko 3		Pts: Mahjoubi 24; Rebs: Mahjoubi 8 Asts: Mahjoubi, Lejmi 2

Gimnodesportivo Vavá Duarte, Praia

6 July
17:15

Box Score

Ivory Coast	53–55	Guinea
Scoring by quarter: 5–14, 12–15, 20–11, 16–15
Pts: Moulare 19; Rebs: Lath 10; Asts: Moulare, Coulibaly 2		Pts: Sylla 17; Rebs: Diallo, Camara 8 Asts: Soufane, Camara 2

Gimnodesportivo Vavá Duarte, Praia

7 July
12:45

Box Score

Guinea	63–57	Tunisia
Scoring by quarter: 14–19, 12–14, 16–14, 21–10
Pts: Soufane, Kaba 10; Rebs: Sylla 5 Asts: three players 1		Pts: Mahjoubi 9 Rebs: Mahjoubi 7 Asts: Abbassi 1

Gimnodesportivo Vavá Duarte, Praia

7 July
15:00

Box Score

Ivory Coast	60–62	Rwanda
Scoring by quarter: 10–14, 14–11, 17–15, 19–22
Pts: Moulare 27; Rebs: Lath 16; Asts: Zunon, Moulare 2		Pts: Sano 16; Rebs: Sano 14; Asts: Mutabazi 5

Gimnodesportivo Vavá Duarte, Praia

8 July
12:45

Box Score

Rwanda	47–63	Guinea
Scoring by quarter: 12–19, 8–16, 10–19, 17–9
Pts: Ishema 17; Rebs: Sano 10; Asts: Mutabazi 2		Pts: Kaba 16; Rebs: Sylla 13; Asts: Soufane 4

Gimnodesportivo Vavá Duarte, Praia

8 July
17:15

Box Score

Mali	65–57	Ivory Coast
Scoring by quarter: 11–14, 24–11, 12–18, 18–14
Pts: Traore 14; Rebs: Singare, Traore 13; Asts: Kanoute 4		Pts: Moulare 16; Rebs: Lath 7 Asts: Moulare, Coulibaly 3

Gimnodesportivo Vavá Duarte, Praia

9 July
12:45

Box Score

Tunisia	59–56	Ivory Coast
Scoring by quarter: 19–10, 9–19, 14–13, 17–14
Pts: Mahjoubi 23; Rebs: Abbassi 12; Asts: Tarhouni, Sahnoun 2		Pts: Moulare 23; Rebs: Lath 14; Asts: Zunon 2

Gimnodesportivo Vavá Duarte, Praia

9 July
15:00

Box Score

Rwanda	40–70	Mali
Scoring by quarter: 4–13, 13–19, 15–14, 8–24
Pts: Sano 10; Rebs: Sano 7 Asts: Kizito 5		Pts: Traore 19; Rebs: Singare 13; Asts: three players 3

Gimnodesportivo Vavá Duarte, Praia

10 July
12:45

Box Score

Guinea	48–54	Mali
Scoring by quarter: 10–13, 12–10, 17–18, 9–13
Pts: Diallo 15; Rebs: three players 6 Asts: Soufane 2		Pts: Keita 13; Rebs: Singare 11; Asts: none

Gimnodesportivo Vavá Duarte, Praia

10 July
17:15

Box Score

Tunisia	88–75	Rwanda
Scoring by quarter: 24–13, 25–17, 14–20, 25–25
Pts: Tarhouni 24; Rebs: Tarhouni 10; Asts: Tarhouni 6		Pts: Sano 20; Rebs: Kevin 16; Asts: Kizito, Niyomugabo 3

Gimnodesportivo Vavá Duarte, Praia

== Knockout phase ==
All times are local Cape Verde Time (UTC-1:00).

=== Ninth place game ===
Ninth place game
A5	Algeria	51
B5	Ivory Coast	63

12 July
10:30

Box Score

Algeria	51–63	Ivory Coast
Scoring by quarter: 13–18, 16–14, 12–21, 10–10
Pts: Yahya 21; Rebs: Rehaim 8 Asts: Zidouni 3		Pts: Lath 21; Rebs: Lath 17; Asts: Moulare 7

Gimnodesportivo Vavá Duarte, Praia

=== Bracket ===
Fifth place
B4	Rwanda	78
B3	Tunisia	53
Seventh place
A3	Angola	80
A4	Cape Verde	54

5–8 classification
B4	Rwanda	72
A3	Angola	70
A4	Cape Verde	58
B3	Tunisia	64

Quarterfinals
A1	Egypt	78
B4	Rwanda	51
B2	Guinea	77
A3	Angola	54
B1	Mali	61
A4	Cape Verde	41
A2	Nigeria	86
B3	Tunisia	36

Semifinals
A1	Egypt	71
B2	Guinea	67
B1	Mali	54
A2	Nigeria	45

Final
A1	Egypt	66
B1	Mali	57
Third place
B2	Guinea	53
A2	Nigeria	54

=== Quarterfinals ===
12 July
12:45

Box Score

Rwanda	51–78	Egypt
Scoring by quarter: 13–17, 9–17, 16–22, 13–22
Pts: Kizito, Ishema 11; Rebs: Ishema 14; Asts: Kizito, Ishema 3		Pts: Ahmed 22; Rebs: Ahmed 11; Asts: four players 2

Gimnodesportivo Vavá Duarte, Praia

12 July
15:00

Box Score

Tunisia	36–86	Nigeria
Scoring by quarter: 9–24, 10–17, 8–27, 9–18
Pts: Tarhouni 12; Rebs: Khalifa 5 Asts: Rouini, Tarhouni 1		Pts: Ighovodjia 22; Rebs: Chinyelu 15; Asts: Dennis 6

Gimnodesportivo Vavá Duarte, Praia

12 July
17:15

Box Score

Angola	54–77	Guinea
Scoring by quarter: 13–24, 7–18, 19–20, 15–15
Pts: Soares 11; Rebs: Soares 9 Asts: three players 1		Pts: Donzo 21; Rebs: Sylla 14; Asts: Soufane 4

Gimnodesportivo Vavá Duarte, Praia

12 July
19:30

Box Score

Cape Verde	41–61	Mali
Scoring by quarter: 7–20, 10–18, 8–7, 16–16
Pts: Silva 13; Rebs: Silva 13; Asts: Silva 2		Pts: Keita 10; Rebs: Dembele 11; Asts: Kanoute 4

Gimnodesportivo Vavá Duarte, Praia

=== 5–8 classification ===
13 July
12:45

Box Score

Rwanda	72–70	Angola
Scoring by quarter: 12–15, 19–12, 19–22, 22–21
Pts: Sano 19; Rebs: Sano 9 Asts: Sano 2		Pts: Avelino 21; Rebs: Soares 10; Asts: Avelino 4

Gimnodesportivo Vavá Duarte, Praia

13 July
15:00

Box Score

Cape Verde	58–64	Tunisia
Scoring by quarter: 18–14, 11–16, 5–16, 24–18
Pts: Silva 26; Rebs: Caetano 15; Asts: Monteiro, Silva 3		Pts: Tarhouni 17; Rebs: Tarhouni, Khalifa 7 Asts: Rouini, Bengabsia 2

Gimnodesportivo Vavá Duarte, Praia

=== Semifinals ===
13 July
17:15

Box Score

Egypt	71–67	Guinea
Scoring by quarter: 13–8, 19–17, 16–26, 23–16
Pts: Ahmed 15; Rebs: Ahmed 16; Asts: Eldiasty, Abouzeid 3		Pts: Donzo 20; Rebs: Sylla 17; Asts: Soufane 4

Gimnodesportivo Vavá Duarte, Praia

13 July
19:30

Box Score

Mali	54–45	Nigeria
Scoring by quarter: 14–11, 11–12, 17–11, 12–11
Pts: Toure 12; Rebs: Dembele 13; Asts: Sinayoko 3		Pts: Chinyelu 12; Rebs: Chinyelu 17; Asts: Okpara, Isah 2

Gimnodesportivo Vavá Duarte, Praia

=== Seventh place game ===
14 July
12:45

Box Score

Angola	80–54	Cape Verde
Scoring by quarter: 20–15, 22–10, 19–13, 19–16
Pts: Avelino 17; Rebs: Avelino 9 Asts: Neto 3		Pts: Caetano 15; Rebs: Silva 12; Asts: Buccilli 4

Gimnodesportivo Vavá Duarte, Praia

=== Fifth place game ===
14 July
15:00

Box Score

Rwanda	78–53	Tunisia
Scoring by quarter: 17–8, 10–11, 19–14, 32–20
Pts: Ishema 25; Rebs: Ishema 14; Asts: Niyomugabo 8		Pts: Tarhouni 21; Rebs: Morjane 9 Asts: four players 1

Gimnodesportivo Vavá Duarte, Praia

=== Third place game ===
14 July
17:15

Box Score

Guinea	53–54	Nigeria
Scoring by quarter: 10–20, 13–3, 14–11, 16–20
Pts: Donzo 14; Rebs: Donzo 10; Asts: Diallo 3		Pts: Dennis 14; Rebs: Chinyelu 20; Asts: Okpara 3

Gimnodesportivo Vavá Duarte, Praia

=== Final ===
14 July
19:30

Box Score

Egypt	66–57	Mali
Scoring by quarter: 10–18, 20–9, 22–13, 14–17
Pts: Abouzeid 19; Rebs: Mohamed 11; Asts: Rehan 3		Pts: Toure 13; Rebs: Dembele 14; Asts: Kanoute 4

Gimnodesportivo Vavá Duarte, Praia

2019 FIBA Under-16 African champions

Egypt
4th title

== Final ranking ==
Qualified to the 2020 FIBA Under-17 Basketball World Cup.

Rank	Team	Record	Points		
Rank	Team	Record	For	Against	Diff.
1st place, gold medalist(s)	Egypt	7–0	538	407	+131
2nd place, silver medalist(s)	Mali	6–1	422	354	+68
3rd place, bronze medalist(s)	Nigeria	5–2	491	389	+102
4	Guinea	4–3	426	390	+36
5	Rwanda	3–4	425	482	–57
6	Tunisia	3–4	414	477	–63
7	Angola	3–4	464	488	–24
8	Cape Verde	1–6	344	462	–118
9	Ivory Coast	1–4	289	292	–3
10	Algeria	0–5	267	339	–72
