= Malawi men's national under-18 basketball team =

Malawi
- FIBA zone: FIBA Africa

World Championships
- Appearances: None

African Championships
- Appearances: None

The Malawi men's national under-18 basketball team is a national basketball team of Malawi, governed by the Basketball Association of Malawi. It represents the country in international under-18 (under age 18) basketball competitions.

The team appeared at the 2010 FIBA Africa Under-18 Championship qualification stage.

== See also ==
- Malawi men's national basketball team
