= 2013 FIBA Africa Under-16 Championship =

2013 FIBA U16 AfroBasket
3rd FIBA Under-16 African Basketball Championship

Tournament details
- Host country: Madagascar
- Dates: June 28–July 7
- Teams: 9
- Venue: 1 (in 1 host city)

Final positions
- Champions: Angola (1st title)

Tournament statistics
- MVP: (Egypt) Mohamed Abdelrahman
- Top scorer: (Tunisia) Gannouni 24.5
- Top rebounds: (Democratic Republic of the Congo) Shekinah 17
- Top assists: (Egypt) Hussein 3.6
- PPG (Team): Egypt (92.3)
- RPG (Team): Angola (58.3)
- APG (Team): Egypt (15.4)

Official website
- 2013 FIBA Africa Championship U-16

The 2013 FIBA Africa Under-16 Championship for Men (alternatively the Afrobasket U16) was the 3rd U-16 FIBA Africa championship, organized by FIBA Africa and played under the auspices of the Fédération Internationale de Basketball, the basketball sport governing body and qualified for the 2014 FIBA Under-17 World Championship. The tournament was held from June 28 to July 7 in Antananarivo, Madagascar, contested by 9 national teams and won by Angola.

== Format ==
- The 9 teams were divided into two groups (Groups A+B) for the preliminary round.
- Round robin for the preliminary round; the top four teams advanced to the quarterfinals.
- From there on a knockout system was used until the final.

== Draw ==
Group A	Group B
Madagascar; Tunisia; Ivory Coast; Gabon	Egypt; Angola; Mozambique; Comoros; DR Congo

== Preliminary round ==
Times given below are in UTC+3.

=== Group A ===
Qualified for the quarter-finals

Team	Pld	W	L	PF	PA	PD	Pts
Tunisia	3	3	0	212	113	+99	6
Madagascar	3	2	1	181	178	+3	5
Ivory Coast	3	1	2	140	189	-49	4
Gabon	3	0	3	117	170	-53	3

28 June 2013
17:00

Report

Ivory Coast	59–79	Madagascar
Scoring by quarter: 10-18, 10-25, 25-22, 14-14
Pts: Lath 18; Rebs: Kone 15; Asts: N'Guessan 3		Pts: Eddy 22; Rebs: Tsizanirina 12; Asts: Eddy 4

Palais des Sports, Antananarivo

29 June 2013
15:00

Report

Gabon	41–47	Ivory Coast
Scoring by quarter: 8-13, 8-20, 15-6, 10-8
Pts: Sarahn 12; Rebs: Nze Mba 10; Asts: Edou 2		Pts: Lath 12; Rebs: Kone 16; Asts: Lath 4

Palais des Sports, Antananarivo

29 June 2013
17:00

Report

Madagascar	48–74	Tunisia
Scoring by quarter: 11-19, 14-15, 17-18, 6-22
Pts: Elly 15; Rebs: Kiady 12; Asts: Orlando 6		Pts: Gannouni 25; Rebs: Saidani 14; Asts: Gannouni 3

Palais des Sports, Antananarivo

30 June 2013
15:00

Report

Tunisia	69–34	Ivory Coast
Scoring by quarter: 18-8, 19-3, 12-12, 20-11
Pts: Saidani 17; Rebs: Jaouadi 8 Asts: Saidani 3		Pts: Kouassi 7 Rebs: Kone 7 Asts: n/a

Palais des Sports, Antananarivo

01 July 2013
17:00

Report

Gabon	45–54	Madagascar
Scoring by quarter: 9-16, 10-16, 19-6, 7-16
Pts: Tgana 12; Rebs: Nkoma 12; Asts: Tgana 2		Pts: Kiady 14; Rebs: Eddy 15; Asts: Elly 3

Palais des Sports, Antananarivo

02 July 2013
17:00

Report

Tunisia	69–31	Gabon
Scoring by quarter: 22-16, 22-10, 10-2, 15-3
Pts: Gannouni 25; Rebs: Mabrouki 9 Asts: Mabrouki 3		Pts: Nguema 8 Rebs: Nguema 9 Asts: Mba 3

Palais des Sports, Antananarivo

=== Group B ===
Qualified for the quarter-finals

Team	Pld	W	L	PF	PA	PD	Pts
Egypt	4	4	0	391	168	+223	8
Angola	4	3	1	319	243	+76	7
DR Congo	4	2	2	234	264	-30	6
Mozambique	4	1	3	230	285	-55	5
Comoros	4	0	4	133	347	-214	4

28 June 2013
14:00

Report

DR Congo	51–93	Egypt
Scoring by quarter: 9-26, 13-22, 14-25, 15-20
Pts: Shekinah 17; Rebs: Shekinah 21; Asts: Mpolo 3		Pts: Abdelrahman 22; Rebs: Abdalla 8 Asts: Hamed 3

Palais des Sports, Antananarivo

29 June 2013
13:00

Report

Comoros	30–91	Angola
Scoring by quarter: 9-22, 2-24, 11-19, 8-26
Pts: Youssouf 13; Rebs: Yassine 6 Asts: Allaoui 1		Pts: Mílton 14; Rebs: Sílvio 12; Asts: Dó 3

Palais des Sports, Antananarivo

30 June 2013
13:00

Report

Mozambique	37–102	Egypt
Scoring by quarter: 12-20, 13-34, 8-26, 4-22
Pts: Chuma 13; Rebs: Bruno 5 Asts: Titos 2		Pts: Saadeldin 20; Rebs: Elmorsy 8 Asts: Taha 3

Palais des Sports, Antananarivo

30 June 2013
17:00

Report

Comoros	37–65	DR Congo
Scoring by quarter: 8-21, 10-21, 9-8, 10-16
Pts: Youssouf 19; Rebs: Yassine 8 Asts: Youssouf 2		Pts: Shekinah 23; Rebs: Shekinah 15; Asts: Lomingo 3

Palais des Sports, Antananarivo

01 July 2013
13:00

Report

Mozambique	76–39	Comoros
Scoring by quarter: 19-11, 19-7, 16-8, 22-13
Pts: Loren 31; Rebs: Loren 16; Asts: Titos 5		Pts: Yassine 11; Rebs: Yassine 16; Asts: Yassine 3

Palais des Sports, Antananarivo

30 June 2013
15:00

Report

Angola	88–60	DR Congo
Scoring by quarter: 21-13, 16-12, 18-16, 33-19
Pts: A.Jungo 18; Rebs: Sílvio 15; Asts: Dó 4		Pts: Shekinah 13; Rebs: Shekinah 19; Asts: Glody 4

Palais des Sports, Antananarivo

02 July 2013
13:00

Report

Egypt	114–27	Comoros
Scoring by quarter: 29-4, 31-15, 25-4, 29-4
Pts: Abdelrahman 41; Rebs: Hussein 8 Asts: Hussein 8		Pts: Youssouf 15; Rebs: Yassine 8 Asts: Yassine 1

Palais des Sports, Antananarivo

02 July 2013
15:00

Report

Angola	87–71	Mozambique
Scoring by quarter: 25-12, 24-14, 17-19, 21-26
Pts: B.Santos 18; Rebs: B.Santos 13; Asts: Dó 2		Pts: Chuma 21; Rebs: Loren 8 Asts: Titos 6

Palais des Sports, Antananarivo

03 July 2013
15:00

Report

DR Congo	57–46	Mozambique
Scoring by quarter: 20-9, 12-5, 12-12, 13-20
Pts: Shekinah 21; Rebs: Shekinah 13; Asts: Santu 3		Pts: Wagner 14; Rebs: Wagner 14; Asts: Loren 3

Palais des Sports, Antananarivo

03 July 2013
17:00

Report

Egypt	82–53	Angola
Scoring by quarter: 15-12, 19-11, 24-17, 24-13
Pts: Taha 14; Rebs: Abdalla 9 Asts: Hussein 5		Pts: A.Jungo 16; Rebs: Sílvio 9 Asts: Eric 3

Palais des Sports, Antananarivo

== Knockout stage ==
All matches were played in: Palais des Sports, Antananarivo

Quarter-finals
05 July
Mozambique	55
Tunisia	71
05 July
Ivory Coast	33
Angola	68
05 July
DR Congo	71
Madagascar	78
05 July
Gabon	37
Egypt	82

Semi-finals
06 July
Tunisia	59
Angola	72
06 July
Egypt	107
Madagascar	63

Final
07 July
Angola	75
Egypt	66
Third place
07 July
Tunisia	70
Madagascar	49

5th place bracket

Semi-finals
06 July
Mozambique	59
Ivory Coast	55
06 July
Gabon	60
DR Congo	62

Fifth place
07 July
Mozambique	57
DR Congo	63
Seventh place
07 July
Ivory Coast	36
Gabon	52

=== Quarterfinals ===
05 July
13:00

Report

Mozambique	55–71	Tunisia
Scoring by quarter: 16–27, 18–18, 13–14, 10–12
Pts: Loren 29; Rebs: Loren 12; Asts: Titos 2		Pts: Gannouni 43; Rebs: Brahem 8 Asts: Azzabi 6

Palais des Sports, Antananarivo

05 July
15:00

Report

Ivory Coast	33–68	Angola
Scoring by quarter: 9–12, 4–23, 10–20, 10–13
Pts: N'Guessan 9 Rebs: Kone 9 Asts: N'Guessan 1		Pts: A.Jungo 27; Rebs: Sílvio 10; Asts: Edmilson 4

Palais des Sports, Antananarivo

05 July
17:00

Report

DR Congo	71–78	Madagascar
Scoring by quarter: 11–17, 22–16, 19–14, 19–31
Pts: Shekinah 25; Rebs: Shekinah 20; Asts: Makubika 2		Pts: Orlando 17; Rebs: Kenny 10; Asts: Eddy 3

Palais des Sports, Antananarivo

05 July
19:00

Report

Gabon	37–82	Egypt
Scoring by quarter: n/a-13, 12–17, 8–31, 17–21
Pts: Sarahn 12; Rebs: Nguema 5 Asts: N'Dui 1		Pts: Abdelrahman 22; Rebs: Metwali 9 Asts: Abdelrahman 5

Palais des Sports, Antananarivo

=== Classification 5–8 ===
06 July
11:00

Report

Mozambique	59–55	Ivory Coast
Scoring by quarter: 16–16, 17–8, 14–21, 12–10
Pts: Chuma 23; Rebs: Guiamba 10; Asts: Chuma 3		Pts: Guede 17; Rebs: N'Guessan 11; Asts: Lath 2

Palais des Sports, Antananarivo

06 July
13:00

Report

DR Congo	62–60	Gabon
Scoring by quarter: 10–12, 14–14, 13–12, 25–22
Pts: Glody 17; Rebs: Shekinah 15; Asts: Shekinah 1		Pts: Sarahn 17; Rebs: Nze Mba 10; Asts: N'Dui 5

Palais des Sports, Antananarivo

=== Semifinals ===
06 July
15:00

Report

Tunisia	59–72	Angola
Scoring by quarter: 19–7, 18–13, 16–32, 6–20
Pts: Gannouni 17; Rebs: Gannouni 7 Asts: Hajri 4		Pts: Daniel 14; Rebs: Sílvio 17; Asts: Eric 4

Palais des Sports, Antananarivo

06 July
17:00

Report

Madagascar	63–107	Egypt
Scoring by quarter: 16–31, 19–18, 12–31, 16–27
Pts: Orlando 20; Rebs: Kiady 10; Asts: Orlando 5		Pts: Abdelrahman 37; Rebs: Abdalla 7 Asts: Mohamed 5

Palais des Sports, Antananarivo

=== Seventh place game ===
07 July
10:30

Report

Ivory Coast	36–52	Gabon
Scoring by quarter: 15–10, 7–18, 9–10, 5–14
Pts: Guede 14; Rebs: Belga 19; Asts: Belga 1		Pts: Sarahn 22; Rebs: Nguema 15; Asts: Nguema 2

Palais des Sports, Antananarivo

=== Fifth place game ===
07 July
12:30

Report

Mozambique	57–63	DR Congo
Scoring by quarter: 10–13, 14–13, 14–20, 19–17
Pts: Loren 23; Rebs: Loren 13; Asts: Titos 3		Pts: Luasa 18; Rebs: Shekinah 16; Asts: Shekinah 5

Palais des Sports, Antananarivo

=== Bronze medal game ===
07 July
14:30

Report

Tunisia	70–49	Madagascar
Scoring by quarter: 22–8, 11–11, 20–8, 17–22
Pts: Gannouni 21; Rebs: Jaouadi 14; Asts: Azzabi 3		Pts: Elly 18; Rebs: Eddy 9 Asts: Mihaja 3

Palais des Sports, Antananarivo

=== Gold medal game ===
07 July
17:00

Report

Angola	75–66	Egypt
Scoring by quarter: 21–17, 21–16, 11–28, 22–5
Pts: A.Jungo 23; Rebs: Sílvio 19; Asts: Eric 4		Pts: Abdelrahman 22; Rebs: Elsheikha 8 Asts: Abdelrahman 4

Palais des Sports, Antananarivo

== Final standings ==
Qualified for the 2014 FIBA U17 World Championship

Rank	Team	Record
Gold medal	Angola	6–1
Silver medal	Egypt	6–1
Bronze medal	Tunisia	5–1
4.	Madagascar	3–3
5.	DR Congo	4–3
6.	Mozambique	2–5
7.	Gabon	1–5
8.	Ivory Coast	1–5
9.	Comoros	0–4

Angola roster
Aires Goubel, Alexandre Jungo, Avelino Dó, Bruno Santos, Cley Cabanga, Cristiano Xavier, Daniel Manuel, Edmilson Miranda, Eric Amândio, Mílton Valente, Sílvio Sousa, Teodoro Hilário, Coach: Manuel Silva (Gi)

== Awards ==
2013 FIBA Africa Under-16 Championship winner

Angola
First title

Most Valuable Player
(Egypt) Mohamed Abdelrahman

=== All-Tournament Team ===
- (Egypt) Mohamed Abdelmaguid
- (Egypt) Mohamed Abdelrahman MVP
- (Tunisia) Achref Gannouni
- (Angola) Sílvio Sousa
- (Democratic Republic of the Congo) Shekinah Munanga

== Statistical leaders ==
=== Individual Tournament Highs ===
Points

Rank	Name	G	Pts	PPG
1	(Tunisia) Achref Gannouni	6	147	24.5
2	(Egypt) Mohamed Abdelrahman	7	163	23.3
3	(Mozambique) Loren Langa	7	137	19.6
4	(Angola) Alexandre Jungo	7	125	17.9
4	(Democratic Republic of the Congo) Shekinah Munanga	7	125	17.9
6	(Mozambique) Joaquim Chuma	7	110	15.7
7	(Comoros) Ahmed Youssouf	4	55	13.8
8	(Madagascar) Orlando Rahajaniaina	6	81	13.5
9	(Madagascar) Elly Randriamampionona	6	70	11.7
9	(Madagascar) Eddy Ramanampisoa	6	70	11.7

Rebounds

Rank	Name	G	Rbs	RPG
1	(Democratic Republic of the Congo) Shekinah Munanga	7	119	17
2	(Angola) Sílvio Sousa	7	89	12.7
3	(Ivory Coast) Kigninlman Kone	5	55	11
4	(Angola) Alexandre Jungo	7	72	10.3
5	(Gabon) Emmanuel Nguema	6	57	9.5
5	(Madagascar) Kiady Rabarijoelina	6	57	9.5
7	(Comoros) Yassine Abdoulmaki	4	38	9.5
8	(Mozambique) Loren Langa	7	66	9.4
9	(Ivory Coast) Joyce Belga	6	50	8.3
10	(Democratic Republic of the Congo) Jonathan Luasa	7	54	7.7

Assists

Rank	Name	G	Ast	APG
1	(Egypt) Raafat Hussein	7	25	3.6
2	(Egypt) Mohamed Abdelrahman	7	20	2.9
2	(Mozambique) Titos Fernando	7	20	2.9
4	(Angola) Eric Amândio	7	17	2.4
4	(Democratic Republic of the Congo) Glody Dialembokembi	7	17	2.4
6	(Egypt) Ahmed Metwali	7	16	2.3
7	(Madagascar) Orlando Rahajaniaina	6	14	2.3
8	(Tunisia) Louay Azzabi	6	13	2.2
9	(Egypt) Mohamed Abdelmaguid	7	13	1.9
10	(Tunisia) Achref Gannouni	6	11	1.8

Steals

Rank	Name	G	Sts	SPG
1	(Gabon) Mahony N'Dui	6	28	4.7
2	(Tunisia) Achref Gannouni	6	23	3.8
2	(Madagascar) Orlando Rahajaniaina	6	23	3.8
4	(Egypt) Ahmed Metwali	7	25	3.6
5	(Egypt) Mohamed Abdelmaguid	7	23	3.3
6	(Gabon) Jeriel Tgana	6	20	3.3
7	(Ivory Coast) Henri Lath	6	19	3.2
8	(Egypt) Mohamed Abdelrahman	7	21	3
9	(Madagascar) Elly Randriamampionona	6	17	2.8
10	(Egypt) Ahmed Taha	7	19	2.7

Blocks

Rank	Name	G	Bks	BPG
1	(Democratic Republic of the Congo) Shekinah Munanga	7	31	4.4
2	(Angola) Sílvio Sousa	7	14	2
3	(Tunisia) Ahmed Mabrouki	6	9	1.5
4	(Angola) Alexandre Jungo	7	10	1.4
5	(Madagascar) Kelly Randrianarivelo	5	6	1.2
6	(Mozambique) Ivander Macia	7	7	1
7	(Gabon) Kevin Mba	6	6	1
8	(Madagascar) Kiady Rabarijoelina	6	5	0.8
9	(Ivory Coast) Kigninlman Kone	5	4	0.8
10	(Comoros) Yassine Abdoulmaki	4	3	0.8

Minutes

Rank	Name	G	Min	MPG
1	(Mozambique) Joaquim Chuma	7	274	39.1
2	(Comoros) Ahmed Youssouf	4	156	39
3	(Mozambique) Titos Fernando	7	272	38.9
4	(Democratic Republic of the Congo) Shekinah Munanga	7	265	37.9
5	(Comoros) Yassine Abdoulmaki	4	148	37
6	(Mozambique) Loren Langa	7	248	35.4
7	(Ivory Coast) Abraham N'Guessan	6	207	34.5
8	(Comoros) Awadi Ouledi	4	138	34.5
9	(Mozambique) Wagner Guiamba	7	228	32.6
10	(Ivory Coast) Kigninlman Kone	5	158	31.6

=== Individual Game Highs ===
Department	Name	Total	Opponent
Points	(Tunisia) Achref Gannouni	43	Mozambique
Rebounds	(Democratic Republic of the Congo) Shekinah Munanga	21	Egypt
Assists	(Egypt) Ahmed Metwali (Egypt) Raafat Hussein	8	Comoros
Steals	(Gabon) Mahony N'Dui	9	Ivory Coast
Blocks	(Democratic Republic of the Congo) Shekinah Munanga	7	Madagascar
2-point field goal percentage	(Egypt) Mohamed Abdelmaguid	87.5% (7/8)	Mozambique
3-point field goal percentage	(Egypt) Ahmed Taha	100% (2/2)	Angola; Mozambique
Free throw percentage	(Tunisia) Achref Gannouni	100% (6/6)	Madagascar
Turnovers	(Ivory Coast) Gnahore Guede (Madagascar) Orlando Rahajaniaina	15	Gabon; Egypt

=== Team Tournament Highs ===
Points per Game

Pos.	Name	PPG
1	Egypt	92.3
2	Angola	76.3
3	Tunisia	68.7
4	Madagascar	61.8
5	DR Congo	61.4
6	Mozambique	57.3
7	Gabon	44.3
8	Ivory Coast	44
9	Comoros	33.3

Total Points

Pos.	Name	PPG
1	Egypt	646
2	Angola	534
3	DR Congo	430
4	Tunisia	412
5	Mozambique	401
6	Madagascar	371
7	Gabon	266
8	Ivory Coast	264
9	Comoros	133

Rebounds

Pos.	Name	RPG
1	Angola	58.3
2	Ivory Coast	52.3
3	DR Congo	50.4
3	Egypt	50.4
5	Tunisia	48.8
6	Madagascar	45.7
7	Gabon	45
8	Mozambique	42.1
9	Comoros	34.2

Assists

Pos.	Name	APG
1	Egypt	15.4
2	Madagascar	11.3
3	Tunisia	10.8
4	Angola	10.3
5	DR Congo	9.9
6	Mozambique	7.1
7	Gabon	5.5
8	Comoros	4.8
9	Ivory Coast	3.8

Steals

Pos.	Name	SPG
1	Egypt	19.1
2	Gabon	16.3
3	Madagascar	14.2
4	Tunisia	12.2
5	Ivory Coast	11.8
6	Angola	10.6
7	Mozambique	9.3
8	Comoros	8
9	DR Congo	7.4

Blocks

Pos.	Name	BPG
1	DR Congo	5.9
2	Angola	5.4
3	Tunisia	4.5
4	Gabon	4
5	Egypt	3.6
6	Madagascar	3.5
7	Ivory Coast	2
8	Mozambique	1.7
9	Comoros	1.5

2-point field goal percentage

Pos.	Name	%
1	Egypt	54.4
2	Tunisia	46.4
3	Angola	45.9
4	DR Congo	39.1
5	Madagascar	38.4
6	Mozambique	37.7
7	Gabon	30.1
8	Ivory Coast	25
9	Comoros	19.8

3-point field goal percentage

Pos.	Name	%
1	Egypt	25
2	Madagascar	21.6
3	Tunisia	17.9
4	Angola	17.6
5	Comoros	17.4
6	DR Congo	17
7	Mozambique	15.2
8	Ivory Coast	13.1
9	Gabon	10.1

Free throw percentage

Pos.	Name	%
1	Egypt	59.7
2	Tunisia	57.6
3	Comoros	53.2
4	Angola	52.3
5	Mozambique	52.2
6	Madagascar	50.8
7	Gabon	45.3
8	DR Congo	44.9
9	Ivory Coast	37.7

=== Team Game highs ===
Department	Name	Total	Opponent
Points	Egypt	114	Comoros
Rebounds	Angola	73	Mozambique
Assists	Egypt	27	Comoros
Steals	Egypt	26	Comoros
Blocks	Angola	12	DR Congo
2-point field goal percentage	Angola	64.7% (33/51)	DR Congo
3-point field goal percentage	Mozambique	50% (2/4)	DR Congo
Free throw percentage	Egypt	88.9% (24/27)	Comoros
Turnovers	Comoros	41	Angola

== See also ==
- 2014 FIBA Africa Under-18 Championship
