= Cameroon men's national under-17 basketball team =

Cameroon
- FIBA zone: FIBA Africa
- National federation: Fédération Camerounaise de Basketball
- Coach: Parfait Bitee

U17 World Cup
- Appearances: 1

U16 AfroBasket
- Appearances: 1
- Medals: (silver) Silver: (2025)

The Cameroon men's national under-16 and under-17 basketball team is a national basketball team of Cameroon, administered by the Fédération Camerounaise de Basketball. It represents the country in international under-16 and under-17 men's basketball competitions.

The team qualified for the FIBA U16 AfroBasket for the first time in 2025 and immediately won the silver medal there, which means that in 2026 they will play in the FIBA Under-17 Basketball World Cup for the first time.

== Tournament record ==
=== FIBA U17 World Cup ===
Year	Result
2026	15th

=== FIBA U16 AfroBasket ===
Year	Result
2025	2nd place, silver medalist(s)

== See also ==
- Cameroon men's national basketball team
- Cameroon men's national under-18 basketball team
- Cameroon women's national under-16 basketball team
