= Ivory Coast men's national under-16 basketball team =

Ivory Coast
- FIBA zone: FIBA Africa
- National federation: Fédération Ivoirienne de Basket-Ball
- Coach: Eric Affi

U17 World Cup
- Appearances: 1

U16 AfroBasket
- Appearances: 5
- Medals: (gold) Gold: (2025)

The Ivory Coast men's national under-16 and under-17 basketball team is a national basketball team of Ivory Coast, administered by the Fédération Ivoirienne de Basket-Ball. It represents the country in international under-16 and under-17 men's basketball competitions.

In the 2025 FIBA U16 AfroBasket Qualifiers (Zone 3) held in Monrovia, Liberia, Côte d'Ivoire secured their fourth consecutive trip to the final round by going undefeated (4–0). Their commanding wins included lopsided victories over Benin (98–20 and 99–22) and Liberia. Jean Philippe Oka earned MVP honors of the qualifiers.

== Tournament record ==
=== FIBA Under-17 World Cup ===
| Year | Result |
|---|---|
| 2026 | 11th |

=== FIBA U16 AfroBasket ===
| Year | Result |
|---|---|
| 2013 | 8th |
| 2019 | 9th |
| 2021 | 5th |
| 2023 | 6th |
| 2025 | 1st place, gold medalist(s) |

== See also ==
- Ivory Coast men's national basketball team
- Ivory Coast men's national under-19 basketball team
- Ivory Coast women's national under-16 basketball team
