= Mali men's national under-17 basketball team =

Mali
- FIBA zone: FIBA Africa
- National federation: Fédération Malienne de Basketball
- Coach: Mamoutou Kané

U17 World Cup
- Appearances: 3
- Medals: None

U16 AfroBasket
- Appearances: 8
- Medals: (gold) Gold: 1 (2017); (silver) Silver: 4 (2009, 2015, 2019, 2021); (bronze) Bronze: 3 (2011, 2023, 2025)

The Mali men's national under-16 and under-17 basketball team is a national basketball team of Mali, administered by the Fédération Malienne de Basketball. It represents the country in international under-16 and under-17 men's basketball competitions.

== U16 AfroBasket record ==
Year	Pos.	Pld	W	L
(Mozambique) 2009	2nd	6	5	1
(Egypt) 2011	3rd	6	5	1
(Madagascar) 2013	Did not participate			
(Mali) 2015	2nd	8	7	1
(Mauritius) 2017	1st	8	8	0
(Cape Verde) 2019	2nd	7	6	1
(Egypt) 2021	2nd	8	7	1
(Tunisia) 2023	3rd	7	6	1
(Rwanda) 2025	3rd	6	5	1
Total	8/9	56	49	7

== U17 World Cup record ==
Year	Pos.	Pld	W	L
(Germany) 2010	Did not qualify			
(Lithuania) 2012	Did not qualify			
(United Arab Emirates) 2014	Did not qualify			
(Spain) 2016	15th	7	2	5
(Argentina) 2018	12th	7	2	5
(Spain) 2022	15th	7	2	5
(Turkey) 2024	Did not qualify			
(Turkey) 2026	Did not qualify			
(Greece) 2028	To be determined			
Total	3/9	21	6	15

== See also ==
- Mali men's national basketball team
- Mali men's national under-19 basketball team
- Mali women's national under-17 basketball team
