= Shekinah Munanga =

Congolese basketball player

No. 00 – Saint-Quentin
- Position: Power forward
- League: LNB Élite

Personal information
- Born: 18 December 1997 (age 28) Kinshasa, DR Congo
- Listed height: 2.02 m (6 ft 8 in)
- Listed weight: 92 kg (203 lb)

Career information
- Playing career: 2016–present

Career history
- 2016–2017: Limoges CSP
- 2017–2018: Monaco
- 2018–2019: Étoile Angers Basket
- 2019–2020: GET Vosges
- 2020–2021: Chartres
- 2021–2023: Évreux
- 2024–2026: Antibes
- 2026–present: Saint-Quentin

Shekinah Munanga (born 18 December 1997) is a Congolese professional basketball player for Saint-Quentin of the French LNB Élite. Previously, he played for Monaco and the club's youth section, and made his debut in the French professional first tier with Limoges CSP in the 2016–17 season. In April 2018, Munanga declared for the 2018 NBA draft, but was not selected in the two rounds.
