= Spain men's national under-17 basketball team =

Spain
- FIBA zone: FIBA Europe
- National federation: FEB
- Coach: Joaquin Prado

U-17 World Cup
- Appearances: 6
- Medals: 2022
Home	Away

The Spain national U-17 basketball team is the national representative for Spain in international basketball competitions, and is organized and run by the Spanish Basketball Federation. The team represents Spain at the FIBA Under-17 World Championship.

== World Cup ==
Year	Pos.	Pld	W	L
(Germany) 2010	10th	7	2	5
(Lithuania) 2012	4th	8	4	4
(United Arab Emirates) 2014	4th	7	3	4
(Spain) 2016	4th	7	5	2
(Argentina) 2018	did not qualify			
(Bulgaria) 2020	Cancelled			
(Spain) 2022	2nd	7	5	2
(Turkey) 2024	7th	7	5	2
(Turkey) 2026	did not qualify			
(Greece) 2028	to be determined			
Total	6/9	36	19	17

== See also ==
- Spanish Basketball Federation
- Spain national youth basketball teams
- Spain women's national under-17 basketball team
