= FIBA Africa =

Basketball in Africa

- Formation: 1961
- Type: Sports federation
- Headquarters: Cairo, Egypt; Abidjan, Ivory Coast
- Members: 54 national associations
- President: (Mozambique) Anibal Manave
- Website: fiba.basketball/africa

FIBA Africa is a zone within the FIBA basketball association which contains all 54 national African FIBA federations. It was founded in 1961. FIBA Africa maintains offices in Cairo and in Abidjan.

== Sub-zones ==
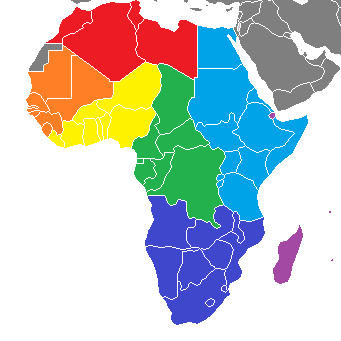
FIBA Africa sub-zones.

The 54 federations of FIBA Africa are grouped in 7 Zones:

1. Zone 1: Maghreb – 4 member associations
2. Zone 2: North West Africa – 8 member associations
3. Zone 3: South West Africa – 8 member associations
4. Zone 4: Central Africa – 8 member associations
5. Zone 5: East Africa – 11 member associations
6. Zone 6: Southern Africa – 10 member associations
7. Zone 7: Indian Ocean – 5 member associations

== Board ==
Bold indicates members of the FIBA Central Board.

FIBA Africa President
(Mozambique) **Anibal Aurelio Manave**
Treasurer
(Egypt) Eskander Adel Tooma
Member of Executive Committee
(Nigeria) Samuel Ahmedu
(Guinea) Maïmouna Bah Diallo
(Libya) Omar Barshushi
(Guinea) Fodé Amara Condé
(Egypt) Hesham El Hariri
(Senegal) Mathieu Faye
(Botswana) Boineelo Hardy
(Morocco) Abdellatif Hatim
(Angola) Paulo Alexandre Madeira Rodrigues da Silva
(Rwanda) Pascale Mugwaneza
(Cameroon) Eric Aimé Niat
(Madagascar) Louis Abel Ntsay
(Uganda) Joy Abooki Olinga
(Madagascar) Jean Michel Ramaroson
(Tunisia) Salma Ben Rondhane
FIBA Executive Director for Africa
(Ivory Coast) Alphonse Bilé

== Members ==
Country	Rank (Aug 2016)	Association	National teams	FIBA affiliation
Zone 1
Algeria	068	Fédération Algérienne de Basket-Ball – FABB	Men's; U18/19; U16/17; Women's; U18/19; U16/17	1963
Libya	079	Libyan Arab Basketball Federation – LBF	Men's; U18/19; U16/17; Women's; U18/19; U16/17	1961
Morocco	060	Moroccan Royal Basketball Federation – FRMBB	Men's; U18/19; U16/17; Women's; U18/19; U16/17	1936
Tunisia	021	Fédération Tunnisienne de Basket-Ball – FTBB	Men's; U18/19; U16/17; Women's; U18/19; U16/17	1956
Zone 2
Cape Verde	063	Federação Cabo-Verdiana de Basquetebol – FCBB	Men's; U18/19; U16/17; Women's; U18/19; U16/17	1988
(The Gambia) Gambia	–	Gambia Basketball Association – GBA	Men's; U18/19; U16/17; Women's; U18/19; U16/17	1972
Guinea-Bissau	–	Federação de Basquetebol da Guiné-Bissau – FBGB	Men's; U18/19; U16/17; Women's; U18/19; U16/17	1994
Guinea	–	Fédération Guinéenne de Basket-Ball – FEGUIBA	Men's; U18/19; U16/17; Women's; U18/19; U16/17	1962
Mali	057	Fédération Malienne de Basket-Ball – FMBB	Men's; U18/19; U16/17; Women's; U18/19; U16/17	1961
Mauritania	–	Fédération de Basketball de la Rép Islamique de Mauritanie – FBBRIM	Men's; U18/19; U16/17; Women's; U18/19; U16/17	1964
Senegal	031	Fédération Sénégalaise de Basket-Ball – FSBB	Men's; U18/19; U16/17; Women's; U18/19; U16/17	1962
Sierra Leone	–	Sierra Leone National Basketball Federation – SLNBF	Men's; U18/19; U16/17; Women's; U18/19; U16/17	1991
Zone 3
Benin	–	Fédération Béninoise de Basket-Ball – FBB	Men's; U18/19; U16/17; Women's; U18/19; U16/17	1962
Burkina Faso	091	Fédération Burkinabè de Basketball – FEBBA	Men's; U18/19; U16/17; Women's; U18/19; U16/17	1964
Ivory Coast	040	Fédération Ivoirienne de Basket-Ball – FIBB	Men's; U18/19; U16/17; Women's; U18/19; U16/17	1961
Ghana	–	Ghana Basketball Association – GBBA	Men's; U18/19; U16/17; Women's; U18/19; U16/17	1962
Liberia	–	Liberia Basketball Federation – LBF	Men's; U18/19; U16/17; Women's; U18/19; U16/17	1964
Niger	–	Fédération Nigérienne de Basket-Ball – FENIBASKET	Men's; U18/19; U16/17; Women's; U18/19; U16/17	1963
Nigeria	016	Nigeria Basketball Federation – NBBF	Men's; U18/19; U16/17; Women's; U18/19; U16/17	1964
Togo	091	Fédération Nationale de Basketball Togo – FTBB	Men's; U18/19; U16/17; Women's; U18/19; U16/17	1963
Zone 4
Cameroon	052	Fédération Camerounaise de Basketball – FECABASKET	Men's; U18/19; U16/17; Women's; U18/19; U16/17	1965
Central African Republic	057	Fédération Centrafricaine de Basket-Ball – FCBB	Men's; U18/19; U16/17; Women's; U18/19; U16/17	1963
Chad	089	Fédération Tchadienne de Basket-Ball – FTBB	Men's; U18/19; U16/17; Women's; U18/19; U16/17	1963
(Republic of the Congo) Congo	079	Fédération Congolaise de Basket-Ball – FECOKET	Men's; U18/19; U16/17; Women's; U18/19; U16/17	1962
(Democratic Republic of the Congo) DR Congo	–	Fédération de Basket-Ball du Congo – FEBACO	Men's; U18/19; U16/17; Women's; U18/19; U16/17	1963
Equatorial Guinea	–	Federación Guineana de Básquetbol – FEGUIBASKET	Men's; U18/19; U16/17; Women's; U18/19; U16/17	1994
Gabon	076	Fédération Gabonaise de Basket-Ball – FEGABAB	Men's; U18/19; U16/17; Women's; U18/19; U16/17	1965
São Tomé and Príncipe	–	Federação Santomense de Basquetebol - FSB	Men's; U18/19; U16/17; Women's; U18/19; U16/17	1983
Zone 5
Burundi	–	Fédération de Basket-Ball du Burundi – FEBABU	Men's; U18/19; U16/17; Women's; U18/19; U16/17	1994
Egypt	041	Egyptian Basketball Federation – EBBFED	Men's; U18/19; U16/17; Women's; U18/19; U16/17	1934
Eritrea	–	Eritrean National Basketball Federation – ENBF	Men's; U18/19; U16/17; Women's; U18/19; U16/17	1997
Ethiopia	–	Ethiopian Basketball Federation – EBBF	Men's; U18/19; U16/17; Women's; U18/19; U16/17	1949
Kenya	–	Kenya Basketball Federation – KBF	Men's; U18/19; U16/17; Women's; U18/19; U16/17	1965
Rwanda	064	Fédération Rwandaise de Basketball Amateur – FERWABA	Men's; U18/19; U16/17; Women's; U18/19; U16/17	1977
Somalia	–	Somali Basketball Federation – SBF	Men's; U18/19; U16/17; Women's; U18/19; U16/17	1960
Sudan	–	Sudan Basketball Association – SBB	Men's; U18/19; U16/17; Women's; U18/19; U16/17	1953
South Sudan	–	South Sudan Basketball Federation – SSBF	Men's; U18/19; U16/17; Women's; U18/19; U16/17	2013
Tanzania	–	Tanzania Basketball Federation – TBF	Men's; U18/19; U16/17; Women's; U18/19; U16/17	1968
Uganda	089	Federation of Uganda Basketball Association – FUBA	Men's; U18/19; U16/17; Women's; U18/19; U16/17	1963
Zone 6
Angola	023	Federação Angolana de Basquetebol – FAB (Archive)	Men's; U18/19; U16/17; Women's; U18/19; U16/17	1979
Botswana	–	Botswana Basketball Association – BBA	Men's; U18/19; U16/17; Women's; U18/19; U16/17	1997
Eswatini	–	Eswatini National Basketball Association – ENBA	Men's; U18/19; U16/17; Women's; U18/19; U16/17	2000
Lesotho	–	Lesotho Basketball Association – LBA	Men's; U18/19; U16/17; Women's; U18/19; U16/17	1997
Malawi	–	Basket Association of Malawi – BASMAL	Men's; U18/19; U16/17; Women's; U18/19; U16/17	1988
Mozambique	061	Federação Moçambicana de Basquetebol – FMB	Men's; U18/19; U16/17; Women's; U18/19; U16/17	1978
Namibia	–	Namibian Basketball Federation – NBF	Men's; U18/19; U16/17; Women's; U18/19; U16/17	1995
South Africa	077	Basketball South Africa – BSA	Men's; U18/19; U16/17; Women's; U18/19; U16/17	1992
Zambia	–	Zambia Basketball Association – ZBA	Men's; U18/19; U16/17; Women's; U18/19; U16/17	1962
Zimbabwe	091	Basketball Union of Zimbabwe – BUZ	Men's; U18/19; U16/17; Women's; U18/19; U16/17	1962
Zone 7
Comoros	–	Fédération Comorienne de Basket-Ball – FCBB	Men's; U18/19; U16/17; Women's; U18/19; U16/17	1995
Djibouti	–	Fédération Djiboutienne de Basket-Ball – FDBB	Men's; U18/19; U16/17; Women's; U18/19; U16/17	1979
Madagascar	082	Fédération Malagasy de Basket-Ball – FMBB	Men's; U18/19; U16/17; Women's; U18/19; U16/17	1963
Mauritius	–	Fédération Mauricienne de Basket-Ball – FMBB	Men's; U18/19; U16/17; Women's; U18/19; U16/17	1959
Seychelles	–	Seychelles Basketball Federation – SBF	Men's; U18/19; U16/17; Women's; U18/19; U16/17	1979

== FIBA World Rankings ==
=== Overview ===
FIBA Men's Rankings (as of 1 September 2026)
Africa*	FIBA	±	National Team	Points
1	24	Steady	South Sudan	530.4
2	27	▲5	Angola	473.9
3	35	▲2	Ivory Coast	413.8
4	42	▲1	Egypt	373.6
5	47	▲1	Senegal	353.4
6	50	▲1	Tunisia	330.3
7	51	▼1	Cape Verde	330.1
8	52	▲1	Nigeria	325.8
9	55	▲3	Cameroon	294.4
10	61	▲2	Mali	259.2
11	67	▲4	Guinea	223.9
12	68	▲4	DR Congo	214.5
13	80	▼1	Uganda	154.8
14	84	▼2	Rwanda	148.1
15	89	Steady	Libya	133.2
16	90	Steady	Madagascar	126.8
17	99	▼1	Central African Republic	104.1
18	109	▼2	Kenya	88.2
19	121	▼2	South Africa	74.2
20	122	▼2	Burundi	73.9
21	123	▼1	Morocco	72.1
22	124	Steady	Mozambique	70.6
23	125	Steady	Algeria	69.5
24	127	▼1	Chad	69.1
25	133	▼4	Gabon	58.5
26	134	▼2	Somalia	55.8
27	137	▼2	Equatorial Guinea	52.9
28	141	▼3	Zambia	49.8
29	144	▼4	Tanzania	43.9
30	145	▼2	Zimbabwe	39.8
31	148	▼2	Eritrea	27.1
*Local rankings based on FIBA ranking points

FIBA Women's Rankings (as of 14 September 2026)
Africa*	FIBA	±	National Team	Points
1	8	Steady	Nigeria	585.2
2	19	▼1	Mali	368.9
3	22	▲3	Senegal	350.7
4	34	▼2	Mozambique	239.3
5	37	▼2	Cameroon	224.2
6	42	▲13	South Sudan	201.3
7	45	▼2	Egypt	185.3
8	53	▼3	Ivory Coast	164.3
9	55	▼4	Angola	160.2
10	57	▼4	Uganda	152.7
11	74	▼2	Rwanda	108.1
12	81	▼3	Kenya	98
13	83	▼3	DR Congo	93.5
14	95	▼1	Guinea	67.8
15	99	▼1	Cape Verde	62
16	100	▼1	Zimbabwe	61
17	102	▼1	Tunisia	59.6
18	103	▼1	Tunisia	56.7
19	112	Steady	Zambia	37.3
20	113	▲1	Burundi	33.7
21	117	▲1	Gabon	27.8
*Local rankings based on FIBA ranking points

==== Team of the Year ====
Teams ranking in the top four – Men's
Year	First	Second	Third	Fourth
2025	South Sudan	Angola	Ivory Coast	Egypt
2024	South Sudan	Ivory Coast	Angola	Tunisia
2023	Nigeria	Tunisia	Senegal	Angola
2022	Nigeria	Tunisia	Senegal	Angola
2021	Nigeria	Tunisia	Angola	Senegal
2020	Nigeria	Angola	Tunisia	Senegal
2019	Nigeria	Senegal	Angola	Tunisia
2018	Nigeria	Senegal	Angola	Tunisia
2017	Nigeria	Tunisia	Angola	Senegal
2016	Angola	Tunisia	Nigeria	Senegal
2015	Angola	Tunisia	Nigeria	Senegal
2014	Angola	Nigeria	Tunisia	Ivory Coast
2013	Angola	Nigeria	Tunisia	Senegal
2012	Angola	Nigeria	Tunisia	Senegal
2011	Angola	Nigeria	Senegal	Ivory Coast

Teams ranking in the top four – Women's
Year	First	Second	Third	Fourth
2025	Nigeria	Mali	Senegal	Mozambique
2024	Nigeria	Mali	Senegal	Mozambique
2023	Nigeria	Mali	Senegal	Egypt
2022	Nigeria	Senegal	Mali	Mozambique
2021	Nigeria	Senegal	Mali	Mozambique
2020	Nigeria	Senegal	Mozambique	Angola
2019	Nigeria	Senegal	Angola	Mozambique
2018	Senegal	Angola	Mali	Mozambique
2017	Senegal	Angola	Mali	Mozambique
2016	Angola	Mali	Senegal	Mozambique
2015	Angola	Mali	Senegal	Mozambique
2014	Mali	Senegal	Angola	Nigeria
2013	Mali	Senegal	Angola	Nigeria
2012	Mali	Nigeria	Senegal	Angola
2011	Senegal	Nigeria	Mali	Tunisia

== FIBA Africa competitions ==
=== National teams ===
- AfroBasket
- AfroBasket Women
- FIBA Africa Nations League
- AfroCan
- Youth championships
  - FIBA U18 AfroBasket
  - FIBA U18 Women's AfroBasket
  - FIBA U16 AfroBasket
  - FIBA U16 Women's AfroBasket
- 3x3 championships
  - FIBA 3x3 Africa Cup
  - FIBA 3x3 U17 Africa Cup

=== Clubs ===
- Basketball Africa League
- Women's Basketball League Africa
- Former competitions
  - FIBA Africa Basketball League
  - African Basketball Cup Winners' Cup

== Medals ==
Last Update: 1 April 2024

=== National Events ===
Exclude Basketball at the African Games, AfroCan and FIBA Africa Nations League.

1. African Men Basketball Championship (1962–2021) - 30 Editions
2. African Women Basketball Championship (1966–2023) - 26 Editions
3. African Men U18 Basketball Championship (1977–2022) - 21 Editions
4. African Women U18 Basketball Championship (1985–2022) - 16 Editions
5. African Men U16 Basketball Championship (2009–2023) - 8 Editions
6. African Women U16 Basketball Championship (2009–2023) - 8 Editions
7. African Men 3x3 Basketball Championship (2017–2023) - 5 Editions
8. African Women 3x3 Basketball Championship (2017–2023) - 5 Editions
9. African Men U17 3x3 Basketball Championship (2019–2023) - 3 Editions
10. African Women U17 3x3 Basketball Championship (2019–2023) - 3 Editions

=== Club Events ===
Exclude African Basketball Cup Winners' Cup.

1. FIBA Africa Basketball League (1972–2019) + Basketball Africa League (2021–2023) - 35 Editions
2. FIBA Africa Women's Basketball League (1985–2023) - 27 Editions

== Current champions ==
=== Nations ===
Competition	Last held	Champion	Title	Runner-up	Next edition
FIBA AfroBasket Men's	2025	Angola	12th	Mali	2029
FIBA AfroCan	2023	Morocco	1st	Ivory Coast	TBD
FIBA AfroBasket Women's	2025	Nigeria	7th	Mali	2027
FIBA Africa U-18 Men's	2026	Ivory Coast	1st	Senegal	2028
FIBA Africa U-18 Women's	2026	Mali	10th	Nigeria	2028
FIBA Africa U-16 Men's	2025	Ivory Coast	1st	Cameroon	2027
FIBA Africa U-16 Women's	2025	Egypt	1st	Ivory Coast	2027

=== 3×3 Africa Cup ===
Competition	Last held	Champion	Title	Runner-up	Next edition
Men	2025	Madagascar	3rd	Egypt	2026
Women	2025	Madagascar	2nd	Egypt	2026

=== Clubs ===
Competition (clubs)	Last held	Champion	Title	Runner-up	Next edition
Basketball Africa League	2026	(Rwanda) RSSB Tigers	1st	(Angola) Petro de Luanda	2027
Women's Basketball League Africa	2025	(Egypt) Al Ahly	1st	(Mozambique) Ferroviário de Maputo	2026

== Summer Olympics record ==
=== Men ===
Nation	(Germany) 1936	(United Kingdom) 1948	(Finland) 1952	(Mexico) 1968	(West Germany) 1972	(Canada) 1976	(Soviet Union) 1980	(United States) 1984	(South Korea) 1988	(Spain) 1992	(United States) 1996	(Australia) 2000	(Greece) 2004	(China) 2008	(United Kingdom) 2012	(Brazil) 2016	(Japan) 2020	(France) 2024	(United States) 2028	Total
Angola										10	11	12	12	12						5
Central African Republic									10											1
Egypt	15-18	19	9-16		16	12		12	12											7
Morocco				16																1
Nigeria															10	11	10			3
Senegal				15	15		11													3
South Sudan																		9		1
Tunisia															11					1
Total	1	1	1	2	2	1	1	1	2	1	1	1	1	1	2	1	1	1		22

=== Women ===
Nation	(United States) 1996	(Australia) 2000	(Greece) 2004	(China) 2008	(United Kingdom) 2012	(Brazil) 2016	(Japan) 2020	(France) 2024	(United States) 2028	Total
Angola					12					1
Mali				12						1
Nigeria			11				11	8		3
Senegal		12				12				2
Zaire	12									1
Total	1	1	1	1	1	1	1	1		8

== World Championship record ==
=== Men ===
Team	(Argentina) 1950	(Chile) 1959	(Socialist Federal Republic of Yugoslavia) 1970	(Puerto Rico) 1974	(Philippines) 1978	(Colombia) 1982	(Spain) 1986	(Argentina) 1990	(Canada) 1994	(Greece) 1998	(United States) 2002	(Japan) 2006	(Turkey) 2010	(Spain) 2014	(China) 2019	(Philippines) (Japan) (Indonesia) 2023	(Qatar) 2027	Total
Algeria											15							1
Angola							20	13	16		11	10	15	17	27	26		9
Cape Verde																28		1
Central African Republic				14														1
Egypt	5	11	13					16	14					24		20		7
Ivory Coast						13	23						20		29	27		5
Nigeria										13		14			17			3
Senegal					14					15		22		16	30			5
South Sudan																17		1
Tunisia													24		20			2
Total	1	1	1	1	1	1	2	2	2	2	2	3	3	3	5	5		35

=== Women ===
Team	(Brazil) 1971	(Colombia) 1975	(South Korea) 1979	(Brazil) 1983	(Malaysia) 1990	(Australia) 1994	(Germany) 1998	(China) 2002	(Brazil) 2006	(Czech Republic) 2010	(Turkey) 2014	(Spain) 2018	(Australia) 2022	(Germany) 2026	Total
Angola											16				1
Kenya						16									1
Madagascar	13														1
Mali										15			11	13	3
Mozambique											15				1
Nigeria									16			8		16	3
Senegal		13	12		14		14	15	15	16		12			8
DR Congo				14	15		16								3
Tunisia								16							1
Total	1	1	1	1	2	1	2	2	2	2	2	2	1	2	22

== See also ==
- Sport in Africa
- Basketball in Africa
