= FIBA U16 AfroBasket =

Under-16 continental basketball championship

- Most recent season or competition: 2025 FIBA U16 AfroBasket
- Formerly: FIBA U16 African Championship; FIBA Africa Under-16 Championship
- Sport: Basketball
- Founded: 2009; 17 years ago
- Organizing body: FIBA Africa
- No. of teams: 12
- Continent: Africa
- Most recent champion: Ivory Coast (1st title)
- Most titles: Egypt (5 titles)
- Qualification: FIBA U17 World Cup
- Related competitions: FIBA U18 AfroBasket
- Website: fiba.basketball/history

The FIBA U16 AfroBasket, previously known as the FIBA U16 African Championship or the FIBA Africa Under-16 Championship, is a biennial international youth basketball competition consisting of under-16 men's national teams organized by FIBA Africa.

The tournament also serves as a qualification for the FIBA Under-17 Basketball World Cup, where the top two teams qualify.

== Summary ==
| Year | Hosts | Final | | | Third place match | | |
| Year | Hosts | Champions | Score | Runners-up | Third place | Score | Fourth place |
|---|---|---|---|---|---|---|---|
| 2009; Details | (Mozambique); Maputo | Egypt | 84–82 | Mali | Nigeria | 65–56 | Algeria |
| 2011; Details | (Egypt); Alexandria | Egypt | 117–67 | Tunisia | Mali | 59–57 | Angola |
| 2013; Details | (Madagascar); Antananarivo | Angola | 75–66 | Egypt | Tunisia | 70–49 | Madagascar |
| 2015; Details | (Mali); Bamako | Egypt | 64–63 | Mali | Algeria | 45–37 | Angola |
| 2017; Details | (Mauritius); Vacoas-Phoenix | Mali | 76–65 | Egypt | Algeria | 57–54 | Tunisia |
| 2019; Details | (Cape Verde); Praia | Egypt | 66–57 | Mali | Nigeria | 54–53 | Guinea |
| 2021; Details | (Egypt); Cairo | Egypt | 63–62 | Mali | Algeria | 65–50 | Chad |
| 2023; Details | (Tunisia); Monastir | Guinea | 84–76 | Egypt | Mali | 63–56 | Angola |
| 2025; Details | (Rwanda); Kigali | Ivory Coast | 62–49 | Cameroon | Mali | 58–51 | Egypt |
| 2027; Details | (N/A); TBD | | – | | | – | |

== Medal table ==
| Rank | Nation | Gold | Silver | Bronze | Total |
|---|---|---|---|---|---|
| 1 | Egypt | 5 | 3 | 0 | 8 |
| 2 | Mali | 1 | 4 | 3 | 8 |
| 3 | Angola | 1 | 0 | 0 | 1 |
| 3 | Guinea | 1 | 0 | 0 | 1 |
| 3 | Ivory Coast | 1 | 0 | 0 | 1 |
| 6 | Tunisia | 0 | 1 | 1 | 2 |
| 7 | Cameroon | 0 | 1 | 0 | 1 |
| 8 | Algeria | 0 | 0 | 3 | 3 |
| 9 | Nigeria | 0 | 0 | 2 | 2 |
| Totals (9 entries) | | 9 | 9 | 9 | 27 |

== Participation details ==
| Team | (Mozambique) 2009 | (Egypt) 2011 | (Madagascar) 2013 | (Mali) 2015 | (Mauritius) 2017 | (Cape Verde) 2019 | (Egypt) 2021 | (Tunisia) 2023 | (Rwanda) 2025 | (N/A) 2027 | Total |
|---|---|---|---|---|---|---|---|---|---|---|---|
| Algeria | 4th | 5th | | 3rd | 3rd | 10th | 3rd | | | | 6 |
| Angola | 6th | 4th | 1st | 4th | | 7th | | 4th | 7th | | 7 |
| Cameroon | | | | | | | | | 2nd | Q | 2 |
| Cape Verde | | | | | | 8th | | | | | 1 |
| Central African Republic | 7th | | | | | | | | | | 1 |
| Chad | | | | | | | 4th | 7th | | | 2 |
| Comoros | | | 9th | | | | | | | | 1 |
| Congo | | 7th | | | | | | | | | 1 |
| DR Congo | | | 5th | | | | | | | | 1 |
| Egypt | 1st | 1st | 2nd | 1st | 2nd | 1st | 1st | 2nd | 4th | Q | 10 |
| Equatorial Guinea | | | | 10th | | | | | | | 1 |
| Ethiopia | | | | 11th | | | | | | | 1 |
| Gabon | | | 7th | | | | 7th | | | | 2 |
| Guinea | 9th | | | | | 4th | | 1st | 11th | | 4 |
| Ivory Coast | | | 8th | | | 9th | 5th | 6th | 1st | Q | 6 |
| Liberia | | | | | | | | | 10th | | 1 |
| Madagascar | | | 4th | | 5th | | | | | | 2 |
| Mali | 2nd | 3rd | | 2nd | 1st | 2nd | 2nd | 3rd | 3rd | Q | 9 |
| Mauritius | | | | | 8th | | | | | | 1 |
| Morocco | | | | 6th | | | | 8th | 9th | | 3 |
| Mozambique | 5th | 6th | 6th | | 7th | | | | | | 4 |
| Nigeria | 3rd | | | 5th | | 3rd | | | | | 3 |
| Rwanda | | | | 9th | 6th | 5th | | 5th | 8th | | 5 |
| Sierra Leone | | | | | | | | | 12th | | 1 |
| South Africa | 8th | 8th | | 8th | | | | | | | 3 |
| Tunisia | | 2nd | 3rd | 7th | 4th | 6th | | 9th | 6th | | 7 |
| Uganda | | | | | | | 6th | 10th | 5th | | 3 |
| Total | 9 | 8 | 9 | 11 | 8 | 10 | 7 | 10 | 12 | # | |

== MVP Awards ==
| Year | MVP Award Winner |
|---|---|
| 2009 | (Egypt) Ahmed Mostafa |
| 2011 | (Egypt) Ehab Amin |
| 2013 | (Egypt) Mohamed Abdelrahman |
| 2015 | (Egypt) Ahmed Khalaf |
| 2017 | (Mali) Siriman Kanouté |
| 2019 | (Egypt) Moamen Abouzeid |
| 2021 | (Egypt) Adam El Halawany |
| 2023 | (Guinea) Nour Gassim Toure |
| 2025 | (Ivory Coast) Jean-Philippe Oka |

== U17 World Cup record ==
| Team | (Germany) 2010 | (Lithuania) 2012 | (United Arab Emirates) 2014 | (Spain) 2016 | (Argentina) 2018 | (Spain) 2022 | (Turkey) 2024 | (Turkey) 2026 | (Greece) 2028 | Total |
|---|---|---|---|---|---|---|---|---|---|---|
| Angola | | | 11 | | | | | | | 1 |
| Cameroon | | | | | | | | 16 | | 1 |
| Egypt | 11 | 12 | 13 | 16 | 16 | 10 | 12 | | | 7 |
| Guinea | | | | | | | 14 | | | 1 |
| Ivory Coast | | | | | | | | 11 | | 1 |
| Mali | | | | 15 | 12 | 15 | | | | 3 |
| Total | 1 | 1 | 2 | 2 | 2 | 2 | 2 | 2 | 2 | |

== Top Ten FIBA Africa boys' teams ==
Updated as of 13 December 2025.

| Rank | Change | Team | Points |
|---|---|---|---|
| 17 | ▲1 | Mali | 552.2 |
| 23 | ▲27 | Ivory Coast ^{C} | 503.6 |
| 25 | Same position | Egypt | 494.3 |
| 26 | ▼5 | Guinea | 488.7 |
| 27 | ▲7 | Cameroon | 481.9 |
| 34 | ▲3 | Angola | 383.9 |
| 35 | ▼5 | Madagascar | 382.8 |
| 36 | ▼16 | Senegal | 379 |
| 48 | Same position | Morocco | 307 |
| 51 | ▲1 | Nigeria | 288.9 |

^{C} Current U16 Africa champions

== See also ==
- FIBA AfroBasket
- FIBA U18 AfroBasket
- FIBA U20 AfroBasket
