= Ahmed Taha =

Palestinian Israeli footballer (born 2001)

Personal information
- Date of birth: 6 June 2001 (age 25)
- Place of birth: Kafr Qasim, Israel
- Height: 1.70 m (5 ft 7 in)
- Positions: Left back; left winger

Team information
- Current team: Kafr Qasim

Youth career
- 2011–2018: Kafr Qasim
- 2018–2019: Maccabi Netanya
- 2019–2020: Kafr Qasim

Senior career*
Years	Team	Apps	(Gls)
2020–	Kafr Qasim	153	(5)

International career^{‡}
2025–	Palestine	1	(0)
- * Club domestic league appearances and goals as of 24 June 2026 ‡ National team caps and goals as of 20 March 2025

Ahmed Taha (Arabic: أحمد طه, Hebrew: אחמד טאהא; born 6 June 2001) is a Palestinian Israeli professional footballer who plays as a left winger for Liga Leumit club Kafr Qasim. Born in Israel, he represents the Palestine national team.

== International career ==
On 20 March 2025 Taha made his debut in the Palestine national football team in the 1–3 loss to Jordan.

Taha's decision to represent Palestine provoked controversy in Israel. Upon his return to Kafr Qasim, players from opponent Maccabi Jaffa refused to shake Taha's hand prior to a match. Israel's Minister for Sport and Culture Miki Zohar also declared, "a player in the national league in Israel came to play in the uniform of the Palestinian national team - as if it were a matter of course. This is an event that cannot be ignored. A player who plays in the national league of the State of Israel cannot represent an entity that does not recognize its right to exist."

== Career statistics ==
=== International ===
As of 25 March 2025

Appearances and goals by national team and year
National team	Year	Apps	Goals
Palestine	2025	1	0
Total		1	0
