= Democratic Republic of Congo Basketball Federation =

The Democratic Republic of the Congo Basketball Federation (French: Fédération de basket-ball de la République démocratique du Congo; Febaco) is the governing body for men's and women's basketball in the Democratic Republic of the Congo. Febaco is an affiliate of FIBA Africa and its offices are located in Kinshasa. As of 2007 its president is Boni Mwawatadi.
