= 2021 FIBA U16 African Championship =

2021 FIBA U16 AfroBasket
7th FIBA Under-16 African Basketball Championship

Tournament details
- Host country: Egypt
- Dates: August 6–15
- Teams: 7 (from 1 confederation)
- Venue(s): 1 (in 1 host city)

Final positions
- Champions: Egypt (5th title)

Official website
- www.fiba.basketball

The 2021 FIBA U16 African Championship was an international basketball competition held in Cairo, Egypt from 6–15 August 2021. It served as a qualifier for the 2022 FIBA Under-17 Basketball World Cup in La Nucia and Alicante in Spain.

== Venue ==
Cairo	2021 FIBA U16 African Championship is located in Egypt
Cairo Stadium Indoor Halls Complex; Halls 3 and 4 (Capacity: each 720)	2021 FIBA U16 African Championship is located in Egypt
Image	2021 FIBA U16 African Championship is located in Egypt

== Participating teams ==
- Egypt
- Algeria
- Chad
- Ivory Coast
- Gabon
- Mali
- Uganda

== Group phase ==
All times are local Egypt Standard Time (UTC-1:00).

Pos	Team	Pld	W	L	PF	PA	PD	Pts	Qualification
1	Mali	6	6	0	565	307	+258	12	Advance to Semifinals
2	Egypt (H)	6	5	1	552	320	+232	11	Advance to Semifinals
3	Algeria	6	4	2	329	285	+44	10	Advance to Semifinals
4	Chad	6	3	3	360	369	−9	9	Advance to Semifinals
5	Ivory Coast	6	2	4	347	391	−44	8	
6	Uganda	6	1	5	288	520	−232	7	
7	Gabon	6	0	6	354	603	−249	6	

Source: FIBA
(H) Hosts

6 August
17:00

Box Score

Algeria	82–63	Gabon
Scoring by quarter: 15-15, 30–26, 14-14', 23-8
Pts: Khodja 28; Rebs: Karabi 18; Asts: Khodja 9		Pts: Makambo Elysé 28; Rebs: Makambo Elysé 13; Asts: Simba Aworet 3

Cairo Stadium Indoor Hall 4
Referees: Didier Gaga (RWA), HOUNGBEDJI, Silver Jacques Houngbedji (BEN), Monicca Nassuuna (UGA)

6 August
20:00

Box Score

Egypt	89–53	Ivory Coast
Scoring by quarter: 18-20, 20–15, 27-9, 24-9
Pts: Elhalawany 15; Rebs: Hussein 12; Asts: Elghayesh, Eldiasty 4		Pts: Diomande 21; Rebs: Haoule 11; Asts: Laubouet 6

Cairo Stadium Indoor Hall 4
Referees: Dorothy Judy Okatch (BWA), Adlen Larouci (ALG), Cynnho Essono Ollomo (GAB)

7 August
14:00

Box Score

Mali	137–47	Gabon
Scoring by quarter: 32-10, 42–15, 26-13, 37-9
Pts: M. Diallo 28; Rebs: Coulibaly 15; Asts: Doumbia 9		Pts: Simba Aworet 12; Rebs: Makambo Elysé 8 Asts: Makambo Elysé, Simba Aworet 2

Cairo Stadium Indoor Hall 4
Referees: Didier Gaga (RWA), Adlen Larouci (ALG), Brian Ssebalamu (UGA)

7 August
17:00

Box Score

Egypt	130–30	Uganda
Scoring by quarter: 37-0, 25–4, 30-13, 38-13
Pts: Eldiasty 22; Rebs: Abouelela 12; Asts: Elghayesh 13		Pts: Mayengo 17; Rebs: Omara 8 Asts: Galiwango 3

Cairo Stadium Indoor Hall 4
Referees: Silver Jacques Houngbedji (BEN), Harouna Maiga (BFA), Cynnho Essono Ollomo (GAB)

7 August

Ivory Coast	0–20	Algeria

Cairo Stadium Indoor Hall 4

8 August
14:00

Box Score

Uganda	25–103	Mali
Scoring by quarter: 10-24, 2-40, 10-18, 3-21
Pts: Omara 9 Rebs: Omara 9 Asts: Mayengo 2		Pts: M. Diallo 32; Rebs: Keita 23; Asts: Doumbia 7

Cairo Stadium Indoor Hall 4
Referees: Adlen Larouci (ALG), Mahmoud Gamal Hussein (EGY), Cynnho Essono Ollomo (GAB)

8 August
16:30

Box Score

Chad	59–46	Ivory Coast
Scoring by quarter: 11-8, 8-10, 23-7, 17-21
Pts: Abdel-Kerim 17; Rebs: Koslengar 20; Asts: Koulambaye 7		Pts: Haoule 18; Rebs: Haoule 12; Asts: Bationo 3

Cairo Stadium Indoor Hall 3
Referees: Didier Gaga (RWA), Hisham Ashraf Hegazy (EGY), Abdou Aliou (MLI)

8 August
20:00

Box Score

Algeria	53–72	Egypt
Scoring by quarter: 7-18, 16-24, 14-19, 16-11
Pts: Khodja 14; Rebs: Karabi 7 Asts: Khodja 7		Pts: Elhalawany 14; Rebs: Abouelela 7 Asts: Eldiasty, Elgizawy, Elghayesh, Elhalawany 4

Cairo Stadium Indoor Hall 4
Referees: Silver Jacques Houngbedji (BEN), Erick Omondi Otieno (KEN), Harouna Maiga (BFA)

9 August
14:00

Box Score

Gabon	56–70	Chad
Scoring by quarter: 13-17, 4-24, 20-17, 19-12
Pts: Makambo Elysé 14; Rebs: Mitoghe 7 Asts: Mitoghe 5		Pts: Tahir 21; Rebs: Tahir 32; Asts: Koulambaye 7

Cairo Stadium Indoor Hall 4
Referees: Harouna Maiga (BFA), Mohamed Lamline Diawara (MLI), Gnoambilé Guillaume Mockey (CIV)

9 August
16:30

Box Score

Uganda	30–69	Algeria
Scoring by quarter: 3-13, 12-11, 10-21, 5-24
Pts: Omara 11; Rebs: Galiwango 11; Asts: Galiwango 2		Pts: Bouzidi 19; Rebs: Abdelouahad 11; Asts: Khodja 10

Cairo Stadium Indoor Hall 3
Referees: Silver Jacques Houngbedji (BEN), Mahmoud Gamal Hussein (EGY), Christelle Madjio Libawo (CMR)

9 August
20:00

Box Score

Mali	93–59	Ivory Coast
Scoring by quarter: 26-15, 28-15, 18-11, 21-18
Pts: Doumbia 22; Rebs: M. Diallo 19; Asts: M. Diallo 7		Pts: Diomande 29; Rebs: Diomande 13; Asts: Laubouet, Bamba-Muluaza 4

Cairo Stadium Indoor Hall 4
Referees: Didier Gaga (RWA), Erick Omondi Otieno (KEN), Adlen Larouci (ALG)

10 August
14:00

Box Score

Gabon	67–81	Uganda
Scoring by quarter: 12-23, 18-16, 21-11, 16-31
Pts: Mihindou Mouiri 15; Rebs: Pyssame Pyssame 8 Asts: Makambo Elysé 6		Pts: Galiwango 30; Rebs: Muwonge 15; Asts: Omara 3

Cairo Stadium Indoor Hall 4
Referees: Nadjet Zenagui (ALG), Abdou Aliou (MLI), Mahmoud Gamal Hussein (EGY)

10 August
17:00

Box Score

Mali	71–53	Algeria
Scoring by quarter: 25-9, 16-9, 19-16, 11-19
Pts: Doumbia 17; Rebs: M. Diallo 8 Asts: T. Diallo, Doumbia, M. Diallo 3		Pts: Khodja, Karabi 10; Rebs: Abdelouahad 8 Asts: Khodja 6

Cairo Stadium Indoor Hall 4
Referees: Harouna Maiga (BFA), Monicca Nassuuna (UGA), Gnoambilé Guillaume Mockey (CIV)

10 August
20:00

Box Score

Egypt	76–49	Chad
Scoring by quarter: 16-13, 15-6, 20-15, 25-15
Pts: Hussein 15; Rebs: Hendawy 12; Asts: Elgizawy 4		Pts: Abdel-Kerim 21; Rebs: Tahir 20; Asts: Manouna 4

Cairo Stadium Indoor Hall 4
Referees: Dorothy Judy Okatch (BWA), Silver Jacques Houngbedji (BEN), Adlen Larouci (ALG)

11 August
14:00

Box Score

Ivory Coast	110–57	Gabon
Scoring by quarter: 23-20, 23-15, 31-8, 33-14
Pts: Diomande 34; Rebs: Diomande 23; Asts: Bamba-Muluaza 9		Pts: Simba Aworet 18; Rebs: Makambo Elysé 11; Asts: Makambo Elysé 4

Cairo Stadium Indoor Hall 4
Referees: Didier Gaga (RWA), Mahmoud Gamal Hussein (EGY), Hisham Ashraf Hegazy (EGY)

11 August
16:30

Box Score

Chad	72–49	Uganda
Scoring by quarter: 21-10, 18-10, 13-16, 20-13
Pts: Tahir 20; Rebs: Tahir 26; Asts: Djouamat Sabaldi, Dignan Elvis 4		Pts: Galiwango 14; Rebs: Muwonge 8 Asts: Galiwango 5

Cairo Stadium Indoor Hall 3
Referees: Mohamed Lamline Diawara (MLI), Abdou Aliou (MLI), Cynnho Essono Ollomo (GAB)

11 August
20:00

Box Score

Egypt	62–71	Mali
Scoring by quarter: 16-21, 4-15, 18-18, 24-17
Pts: Elhalawany 21; Rebs: Hendawy 9 Asts: Elgizawy 7		Pts: M. Diallo 18; Rebs: Coulibaly 13; Asts: M. Diallo, Keita, T. Diallo 3

Cairo Stadium Indoor Hall 4
Referees: Silver Jacques Houngbedji (BEN), Erick Omondi Otieno (KEN), Adlen Larouci (ALG)

12 August
14:00

Box Score

Algeria	52–49	Chad
Scoring by quarter: 14-9, 9-9, 10-13, 19-18
Pts: Khodja 14; Rebs: Abdelouahad 8 Asts: Khodja 6		Pts: Abdel-Kerim 17; Rebs: Tahir 22; Asts: Dignan Elvis 6

Cairo Stadium Indoor Hall 4
Referees: Mohamed Lamline Diawara (MLI), Mahmoud Gamal Hussein (EGY), Gnoambilé Guillaume Mockey (CIV)

12 August
16:30

Box Score

Uganda	73–79	Ivory Coast
Scoring by quarter: 16-17, 24-17, 11-19, 22-26
Pts: Mayengo 25; Rebs: Muwonge 17; Asts: Kisakye, Galiwango 6		Pts: Bationo 20; Rebs: Haoule 19; Asts: Laubouet 6

Cairo Stadium Indoor Hall 3
Referees: Adlen Larouci (ALG), Erick Omondi Otieno (KEN), Cynnho Essono Ollomo (GAB)

12 August
20:00

Box Score

Gabon	64–123	Egypt
Scoring by quarter: 11-39, 16-32, 13-22, 24-30
Pts: Makambo Elysé 28; Rebs: Makambo Elysé 9 Asts: Sophonie Mouele 3		Pts: Abouelela, Amer 17; Rebs: Hussein 14; Asts: Elselmy, Eldiasty 6

Cairo Stadium Indoor Hall 4
Referees: Abdou Aliou (MLI), Nadjet Zenagui (ALG), Silver Jacques Houngbedji (BEN)

13 August
14:00

Box Score

Chad	61–90	Mali
Scoring by quarter: 12-23, 20-10, 13-26, 16-31
Pts: Abdel-Kerim 24; Rebs: Tahir 9 Asts: Abdel-Kerim 4		Pts: Doumbia 22; Rebs: M. Diallo 12; Asts: Doumbia 10

Cairo Stadium Indoor Hall 4
Referees: Erick Omondi Otieno (KEN), Harouna Maiga (BFA), Brian Ssebalamu (UGA)

== Knockout phase ==
Semifinals
1	Mali	70
4	Chad	40
3	Algeria	52
2	Egypt	70

Final
Mali	62
Egypt	63
Third-place
Chad	50
Algeria	65

Semifinals

14 August
14:00

Box Score

Mali	70–40	Chad
Scoring by quarter: 19-5, 22-4, 14-17, 15-14
Pts: Coulibaly 12; Rebs: Coulibaly 10; Asts: Abdel-Kerim 6		Pts: Abdel-Kerim 17; Rebs: Koslengar 11; Asts: Doumbia 4

Cairo Stadium Indoor Hall 4
Referees: Didier Gaga (RWA), Adlen Larouci (ALG), Gnoambilé Guillaume Mockey (CIV)

14 August
20:00

Box Score

Egypt	70–52	Algeria
Scoring by quarter: 16-14, 21-11, 12-17, 21-10
Pts: Elgizawy 11; Rebs: Hendawy 9 Asts: Elgizawy, Elhalawany 5		Pts: Khodja 18; Rebs: Beldjillali 7 Asts: Khodja 6

Cairo Stadium Indoor Hall 3
Referees: Silver Jacques Houngbedji (BEN), Erick Omondi Otieno (KEN), Harouna Maiga (BFA)

Third-place match

15 August
14:00

Box Score

Chad	50–65	Algeria
Scoring by quarter: 8-23, 11-13, 21-12, 10-17
Pts: Andigue 25; Rebs: Lawa Abbas 12; Asts: Dignan Elvis 4		Pts: Khodja 19; Rebs: Abdelouahad 11; Asts: Khodja, Bouzidi 5

Cairo Stadium Indoor Hall 4

Final

15 August
20:00

Box Score

Mali	62–63	Egypt
Scoring by quarter: 12-11, 21-19, 12-18, 17-15
Pts: M. Diallo 17; Rebs: M. Diallo 19; Asts: M. Diall 5		Pts: Amer, Hendawy 15; Rebs: Elmaraghy 7 Asts: Elgizawy 5

Cairo Stadium Indoor Hall 3

== Final standings ==
Qualified to the 2022 FIBA Under-17 Basketball World Cup.

Rank	Team	Record	Points		
Rank	Team	Record	For	Against	Diff.
1st place, gold medalist(s)	Egypt	7–1	685	434	+251
2nd place, silver medalist(s)	Mali	7–1	697	410	+287
3rd place, bronze medalist(s)	Algeria	5–3	426	405	+21
4	Chad	3–5	450	504	-54
5	Ivory Coast	2–4	347	391	-44
6	Uganda	1–5	288	520	-232
7	Gabon	0–6	354	603	-249
