= Egypt men's national under-17 basketball team =

Egypt
- FIBA zone: FIBA Africa
- National federation: Egyptian Basketball Federation
- Coach: Amr Aboul Kheir

U17 World Cup
- Appearances: 7
- Medals: None

U16 AfroBasket
- Appearances: 9
- Medals: (gold) Gold: 5 (2009, 2011, 2015, 2019, 2021); (silver) Silver: 3 (2013, 2017, 2023)

The Egypt men's national under-16 and under-17 basketball team is a national basketball team of Egypt, administered by the Egyptian Basketball Federation. It represents the country in international under-16 and under-17 men's basketball competitions.

== U16 AfroBasket record ==
| Year | Pos. | Pld | W | L |
|---|---|---|---|---|
| (Mozambique) 2009 | 1st | 6 | 5 | 1 |
| (Egypt) 2011 | 1st | 7 | 6 | 1 |
| (Madagascar) 2013 | 2nd | 7 | 6 | 1 |
| (Mali) 2015 | 1st | 8 | 7 | 1 |
| (Mauritius) 2017 | 2nd | 8 | 7 | 1 |
| (Cape Verde) 2019 | 1st | 7 | 7 | 0 |
| (Egypt) 2021 | 1st | 8 | 7 | 1 |
| (Tunisia) 2023 | 2nd | 7 | 5 | 2 |
| (Rwanda) 2025 | 4th | 6 | 3 | 3 |
| Total | 9/9 | 64 | 53 | 11 |

== U17 World Cup record ==
| Year | Pos. | Pld | W | L |
|---|---|---|---|---|
| (Germany) 2010 | 11th | 7 | 1 | 6 |
| (Lithuania) 2012 | 12th | 7 | 0 | 7 |
| (United Arab Emirates) 2014 | 13th | 7 | 2 | 5 |
| (Spain) 2016 | 16th | 7 | 1 | 6 |
| (Argentina) 2018 | 16th | 7 | 1 | 6 |
| (Spain) 2022 | 10th | 7 | 2 | 5 |
| (Turkey) 2024 | 12th | 7 | 1 | 6 |
| (Turkey) 2026 | Did not qualify | | | |
| (Greece) 2028 | To be determined | | | |
| Total | 7/9 | 49 | 8 | 41 |

== See also ==
- Egypt men's national basketball team
- Egypt men's national under-19 basketball team
- Egypt women's national under-17 basketball team
