= FIBA Under-17 Basketball World Cup =

International youth basketball tournament

FIBA U17 Basketball World Cup
- Most recent season or competition: 2026 FIBA Under-17 Basketball World Cup
- Formerly: FIBA Under-17 World Championship
- Sport: Basketball
- Founded: 2010; 16 years ago
- First season: 2010
- Organizing body: FIBA
- No. of teams: 16
- Continents: All (World)
- Most recent champions: United States (8th title)
- Most titles: United States (8 titles)
- Related competitions: FIBA Under-19 Basketball World Cup
- Website: fiba.basketball/history

The FIBA U17 Basketball World Cup (formerly FIBA Under-17 World Championship) is the under-17 men's world basketball championship organized by the International Basketball Federation (FIBA). The inaugural tournament was in July 2010, and is held biennially.

The reigning world champions are United States, winning the tournament in 2026. The next edition will be held in Greece in 2028.

== Composition ==
According to the updated FIBA Internal Regulations, the FIBA U17 World Cup shall be held every two years (2024, 2026, 2028, etc.).

Sixteen teams, representing all continents, are eligible to participate in the FIBA U17 World Cup as follows:

- Directly qualified:
  - The host nation (usually designated by the Central Board a year before the scheduled tournament)
- From each continent:
  - Two from FIBA Africa: Finalists of the FIBA U16 AfroBasket
  - Four from FIBA Americas: Semi-finalists of the FIBA U16 AmeriCup
  - Four from FIBA Asia and FIBA Oceania: Semi-finalists of the FIBA U16 Asia Cup
  - Five from FIBA Europe: Semi-finalists and the fifth-placed team of the FIBA U16 EuroBasket

== Summaries ==
Year	Hosts	Final			Third place match		
Year	Hosts	Champions	Score	Runners-up	Third place	Score	Fourth place
2010	(Germany); Hamburg	United States	111–80	Poland	Canada	83–81	Lithuania
2012	(Lithuania); Kaunas	United States	95–62	Australia	Croatia	93–61	Spain
2014	(United Arab Emirates); Dubai	United States	99–92	Australia	Serbia	62–59	Spain
2016	(Spain); Zaragoza	United States	96–56	Turkey	Lithuania	81–63	Spain
2018	(Argentina); Rosario–Santa Fe	United States	95–52	France	Puerto Rico	90–77	Canada
2022	(Spain); Málaga	United States	79–67	Spain	France	66–58	Lithuania
2024	(Turkey); Istanbul	United States	129–88	Italy	Turkey	101–78	New Zealand
2026	(Turkey); Istanbul	United States	107–81	Serbia	Australia	77–69	Turkey
2028	(Greece); Athens						

== Medal table ==
Rank	Nation	Gold	Silver	Bronze	Total
1	United States	8	0	0	8
2	Australia	0	2	1	3
3	France	0	1	1	2
3	Serbia	0	1	1	2
3	Turkey	0	1	1	2
6	Italy	0	1	0	1
6	Poland	0	1	0	1
6	Spain	0	1	0	1
9	Canada	0	0	1	1
9	Croatia	0	0	1	1
9	Lithuania	0	0	1	1
9	Puerto Rico	0	0	1	1
Totals (12 entries)		8	8	8	24

== Participation details ==
Team	(Germany) 2010	(Lithuania) 2012	(United Arab Emirates) 2014	(Spain) 2016	(Argentina) 2018	(Spain) 2022	(Turkey) 2024	(Turkey) 2026	(Greece) 2028	Total
Angola	–	–	11th	–	–	–	–	–		1
Argentina	9th	6th	10th	13th	11th	11th	10th	–		7
Australia	6th	2nd	2nd	7th	6th	6th	15th	3rd		8
Bosnia and Herzegovina	–	–	–	9th	–	–	–	–		1
Cameroon	–	–	–		–	–	–	15th		1
Canada	3rd	5th	6th	5th	4th	9th	8th	6th		8
China	7th	7th	7th	10th	15th	–	13th	10th		7
Chinese Taipei	–	–	–	14th	–	–	–	–		1
Croatia	–	3rd	–	–	7th	–	–	–		2
Czech Republic	–	8th	–	–	–	–	–	–		1
Dominican Republic	–	–	–	11th	9th	13th	–	–		3
Egypt	11th	12th	13th	16th	16th	10th	12th	–		7
Finland	–	–	–	12th	–	–	–	–		1
France	–	10th	8th	6th	2nd	3rd	9th	5th		7
Germany	8th	–	–	–	–	–	11th	–		2
Greece	–	–	12th	–	–	–	–	–	Q	2
Guinea	–	–	–	–	–	–	14th	–		1
Italy	–	–	9th	–	–	–	2nd	13th		3
Ivory Coast	–	–	–		–	–	–	11th		1
Japan	–	–	14th	–	–	14th	–	14th		3
Lebanon	–	–	–	–	–	16th	–	–		1
Lithuania	4th	9th	–	3rd	–	4th	5th	7th		6
Mali	–	–	–	15th	12th	15th	–	–		3
Montenegro	–	–	–	–	8th	–	–	–		1
New Zealand	–	–	–	–	14th	12th	4th	12th		4
Philippines	–	–	15th	–	13th	–	16th	–		3
Poland	2nd	–	–	–	–	8th	–	–		2
Puerto Rico	–	–	5th	–	3rd	–	6th	8th		4
Serbia	5th	–	3rd	–	10th	5th	–	2nd		5
Slovenia	–	–	–	–	–	7th	–	9th		2
South Korea	12th	11th	–	8th	–	–	–	–		3
Spain	10th	4th	4th	4th	–	2nd	7th	–		6
Turkey	–	–	–	2nd	5th	–	3rd	4th		4
United Arab Emirates	–	–	16th	–	–	–	–	–		1
United States	1st	1st	1st	1st	1st	1st	1st	1st		8
Venezuela	–	–	–	–	–	–	–	16th		1
Total	12	12	16	16	16	16	16	16	16	

== Tournament awards ==
=== Most recent award winners (2026) ===
Award	Winner	Position	Team
Most Valuable Player	Joaquim Boumtje-Boumtje	C	United States
All-Tournament Team	Beckham Black	PG	United States
All-Tournament Team	Luke Paul	SG	Australia
All-Tournament Team	Ömer Kutluay	SF	Turkey
All-Tournament Team	Nikola Kusturica	PF	Serbia
All-Tournament Team	Joaquim Boumtje-Boumtje	C	United States

== Debut of national teams ==
Year	Debutants
2010	Argentina, Australia, Canada, China, Egypt, Germany, Lithuania, Poland; Serbia, South Korea, Spain, United States
2012	Croatia, Czech Republic, France
2014	Angola, Greece, Italy, Japan, Philippines, Puerto Rico, United Arab Emirates
2016	Bosnia and Herzegovina, Chinese Taipei, Dominican Republic, Finland, Mali, Turkey
2018	Montenegro, New Zealand
2022	Lebanon, Slovenia
2024	Guinea
2026	Cameroon, Ivory Coast, Venezuela
2028	TBD

== See also ==
- FIBA Under-19 Basketball World Cup
- FIBA Under-17 Women's Basketball World Cup
- FIBA Under-19 Women's Basketball World Cup
