= Alex P =

Greek-Swedish songwriter and record producer (born 1979)

Alex Papaconstantinou Άλεξ Παπακωνσταντίνου (Alex P)
- Also known as: Alex P
- Born: Alexander Papaconstantinou; December 29, 1979 (age 46); Brännkyrka, Sweden
- Genres: Pop, dance, electronica, R&B, folk
- Occupations: Songwriter, producer
- Years active: 2007-present
- Member of: VAX

Alexander "Alex P" Papaconstantinou (Greek: Αλέξανδρος "Άλεξ" Παπακωνσταντίνου; born 29 December 1979 in Brännkyrka, Sweden) is a Greek-Swedish songwriter and record producer. He has worked with a number of artists including Jennifer López, Paulina Rubio, Enrique Iglesias, Antique, Helena Paparizou, Arash, Anna Vissi, Cameron Cartio, Eleni Foureira, Sarbel and Tamta. In 2011, Papaconstantinou adopted the production pseudonym Alex P and started collaborating with record producer RedOne, joined RedOne's production and 2101 Songs writing team. His collaboration continued until 2014. Along with Adam Baptiste, Papaconstantinou has also been credited as a featured artist under the name "The WAV.s". Since 2017, he has been a member of the pop band VAX. Papaconstantinou has also written and co-written a number of notable songs for Eurovision Song Contest for Sarbel (Greece), Aysel and Arash (Azerbaijan), Ivi Adamou, Eleni Foureira, Tamta and Andromache (Cyprus).

== Eurovision ==
Papaconstantinou has written and co-written a number of songs in various Eurovision Song Contests:

| Year | Country | Song | Artist | Final | Points | Semi | Points |
|---|---|---|---|---|---|---|---|
| 2007 | Greece | "Yassou Maria" | Sarbel | 7 | 120 | Top 10 Previous Year | |
| 2009 | Azerbaijan | "Always" | Aysel and Arash | 3 | 207 | 2 | 180 |
| 2012 | Cyprus | "La La Love" | Ivi Adamou | 16 | 65 | 7 | 91 |
| 2018 | Cyprus | "Fuego" | Eleni Foureira | 2 | 436 | 2 | 262 |
| 2019 | Cyprus | "Replay" | Tamta | 13 | 109 | 9 | 149 |
| 2022 | Cyprus | "Ela" | Andromache | Failed to qualify | | 12 | 63 |

== Collaboration with RedOne ==
In 2011, Papaconstantinou adopted the production pseudonym Alex P and started collaborating with record producer RedOne, joined RedOne's production and 2101 Songs writing team. This collaboration lasted three years until 2014, during which time he co-wrote and co-produced the Enrique Iglesias hit song "I Like How It Feels" and co-wrote and co-produced the Khaled album C'est la vie. In 2013, singer Marc Anthony covered the Khaled song "C'est la vie" as a salsa tune titled "Vivir Mi Vida" ("Live My Life") for his studio album 3.0. This version won a Latin Grammy Award in 2013 for Record of the Year and holds the record for the second-longest run inside the top-five in the Billboard Latin Songs, with 51 weeks. During his collaboration with RedOne, Alex P co-wrote or produced multiple hit singles leading to 3 BMI Awards and a Latin Grammy Award.

== VAX ==
VAX
- Origin: Sweden
- Genres: Pop
- Years active: 2017–present
- Members: Teddy Sky; Alex Papaconstantinou; Viktor Svensson

In 2017, Papaconstantinou co-founded and became a member of the music trio VAX, along with singer Teddy Sky and guitarist Viktor Svensson. VAX released the song "6 in the Morning" featuring the Polish singer-songwriter Margaret followed by "Fireproof" featuring band lead singer Teddy Sky.

=== Discography ===
==== Singles ====
| Title | Year | Peak chart positions | Certifications | Album |
| Title | Year | SWE | Certifications | Album |
|---|---|---|---|---|
| "6 in the Morning" (featuring Margaret) | 2017 | — | | TBA |
| "Fireproof" (featuring Teddy Sky) | 2017 | 51 | GLF: Platinum | TBA |
| "Endless" (featuring Tove Styrke) | 2018 | 76 | | TBA |
| "Bubblegum" (featuring Sorana) | 2018 | — | | TBA |
| "Crime" | 2018 | — | | TBA |
| "What Are We Waiting For" (featuring Ellise) | 2019 | 64 | | TBA |
"—" denotes items which were not released in that country or failed to chart.

== Personal life ==
Alexander Papaconstantinou is of Greek descent. His sister is SVT presenter Ritza Papaconstantinou.

== Selected production discography ==
| Title | Year | Artist / Band | Album | Songwriter | Producer |
|---|---|---|---|---|---|
| "Filla Me" | 2001 | Antique | Die for You | check | |
| "Follow Me" | 2001 | Antique | Die for You | check | |
| "Kalimera" | 2001 | Antique | Die for You | check | |
| "Ligo Ligo" | 2001 | Antique | Die for You | check | |
| "Tabla Dreams" | 2001 | Antique | Die for You | check | |
| "Ela 'Do (Come 2 Me)" | 2002 | Antique | Alli Mia Fora | check | check |
| "Girna Ksana" | 2002 | Antique | Alli Mia Fora | | check |
| "Moro Mou" | 2002 | Antique | Alli Mia Fora | | check |
| "Tora Tora" | 2002 | Antique | Alli Mia Fora | | check |
| "Crying On The Dancefloor" | 2002 | Peter Jöback | I Feel Good and I'm Worth It | | check |
| "Freeway" | 2002 | Peter Jöback | I Feel Good and I'm Worth It | | check |
| "Heal" | 2002 | Peter Jöback | I Feel Good and I'm Worth It | | check |
| "Help Somebody" | 2002 | Peter Jöback | I Feel Good and I'm Worth It | | check |
| "I'm Gonna Do It" | 2002 | Peter Jöback | I Feel Good and I'm Worth It | | check |
| "My Fatal Love" | 2002 | Peter Jöback | I Feel Good and I'm Worth It | | check |
| "Northern Guy" | 2002 | Peter Jöback | I Feel Good and I'm Worth It | | check |
| "She's Like a Butterfly" | 2002 | Peter Jöback | I Feel Good and I'm Worth It | | check |
| "Sinner" | 2002 | Peter Jöback | I Feel Good and I'm Worth It | | check |
| "This is the Year" | 2002 | Peter Jöback | I Feel Good and I'm Worth It | | check |
| "Time to get Tacky" | 2002 | Peter Jöback | I Feel Good and I'm Worth It | check | |
| "Undress Me" | 2002 | Peter Jöback | I Feel Good and I'm Worth It | | check |
| "Ego Moro Mou" | 2003 | Anna Vissi | Paraksenes Eikones | check | check |
| "Anamniseis" | 2004 | Elena Paparizou | Protereotita | check | check |
| "Antitheseis" | 2004 | Elena Paparizou | Protereotita | | check |
| "Katse Kala" | 2004 | Elena Paparizou | Protereotita | check | check |
| "Matia Kai Hili" | 2004 | Elena Paparizou | Protereotita | check | check |
| "Taxidi Gia Ton Agnosto" | 2004 | Elena Paparizou | Protereotita | check | check |
| "Lie (Alex Papaconstantinou Club Edit" | 2005 | Anna Vissi | Nylon | | check |
| "Barone" | 2005 | Cameron Cartio | Borderless | check | check |
| "Henna" | 2005 | Cameron Cartio | Borderless | check | check |
| "Ironiam" | 2005 | Cameron Cartio | Borderless | check | check |
| "Leyli" | 2005 | Cameron Cartio | Borderless | check | check |
| "Madaram" | 2005 | Cameron Cartio | Borderless | check | check |
| "Ni Na Nay" | 2005 | Cameron Cartio | Borderless | check | check |
| "Roma" | 2005 | Cameron Cartio | Borderless | | check |
| "Sandy" | 2005 | Cameron Cartio | Borderless | check | check |
| "Panta Se Perimena" | 2006 | Elena Paparizou | Iparhi Logos | | check |
| "Paradigmatos Hari" | 2006 | Elena Paparizou | Iparhi Logos | | check |
| "Se Pion Na Miliso" | 2006 | Elena Paparizou | Iparhi Logos | | check |
| "Gigolo" | 2006 | Elena Paparizou | Iparhi Logos/The Game of Love | check | check |
| "Iparhi Logos"/"It's Gone Tomorrow" | 2006 | Elena Paparizou | Iparhi Logos/The Game of Love | | check |
| "Mambo!" | 2006 | Elena Paparizou | Iparhi Logos/The Game of Love | check | check |
| "The Game of Love" | 2006 | Elena Paparizou | Iparhi Logos/The Game of Love | check | check |
| "Tipsis"/"You Set My Hear on Fire"" | 2006 | Elena Paparizou | Iparhi Logos/The Game of Love | | check |
| "Pote Xana"/"Let Me Let Go" | 2006 | Elena Paparizou | Iparhi Logos/The Game of Love | check | check |
| "Voulez Vous?" | 2006 | Elena Paparizou | The Game of Love | check | check |
| "Mi Chica" | 2007 | Sarbel | Sahara: Euro Edition | check | check |
| "Yassou Maria" | 2007 | Sarbel | Sahara: Euro Edition | check | check |
| "Stin Pira" | 2008 | Anna Vissi | Apagorevmeno | check | check |
| "Desperado" | 2008 | Sarbel | Kati san esena | check | check |
| "Apo Makria Kai Agapimeni" (Remix by Alex Papaconstantinou) | 2009 | Anna Vissi | Apagorevmeno+ | | check |
| "Fabulous" | 2009 | Anna Vissi | Apagorevmeno+ | check | check |
| "Always" | 2009 | Aysel & Arash | Always | check | check |
| "San Ton Klefti" | 2009 | Giorgos Sabanis | N/A | check | check |
| "Agapi Einai Esi" | 2010 | Anna Vissi | Agapi Einai Esi | | check |
| "Den Tha Iparksei Allo" | 2010 | Anna Vissi | Agapi Einai Esi | | check |
| "Gia Ola Ftei O Theos" | 2010 | Anna Vissi | Agapi Einai Esi | | check |
| "Omprella" | 2010 | Anna Vissi | Agapi Einai Esi | | check |
| "San To Do Kai To Si" | 2010 | Anna Vissi | Agapi Einai Esi | | check |
| "Sta Krifa" | 2010 | Anna Vissi | Agapi Einai Esi | | check |
| "Vampir" | 2010 | Anna Vissi | Agapi Einai Esi | | check |
| "Famous" | 2010 | Big Time Rush | BTR (International version) | | check |
| "To Mistiko Mou Na Vreis" | 2010 | Ivi Adamou | Kalokairi Stin Kardia | check | check |
| "Kita Ti Ekanes" | 2010 | Nikos Ganos | Brosta | check | check |
| "Poso Akoma" | 2010 | Nikos Ganos | | check | |
| "I Like How It Feels" | 2011 | Enrique Iglesias | Sex and Love | check | check |
| "Down for Whatever" | 2011 | Kelly Rowland | Here I Am | | check |
| "Se Thelo Apopse" | 2011 | Kokkina Halia | Emeis | check | check |
| "Break Me" | 2011 | Nikos Ganos | TBD | check | check |
| "This Love is Killing Me" | 2011 | Nikos Ganos | TBD | check | check |
| "Spread a Little Love" | 2012 | Havana Brown | When the Lights Go Out | check | check |
| "La La Love" | 2012 | Ivi Adamou | San Ena Oneiro (Euro Edition) | check | check |
| "C'est la vie" | 2012 | Khaled | C'est la vie | check | check |
| "Hiya Hiya" (feat. Pitbull) | 2012 | Khaled | C'est la vie | check | check |
| "Encore une fois" | 2012 | Khaled | C'est la vie | check | check |
| "Ana Âacheck" | 2012 | Khaled | C'est la vie | check | check |
| "Dima Labess (feat. Mazagan)" | 2012 | Khaled | C'est la vie | check | |
| "Laila (feat. Marwan)" | 2012 | Khaled | C'est la vie | check | check |
| "Bab Jenna" | 2012 | Khaled | C'est la vie | check | check |
| "Samira" | 2012 | Khaled | C'est la vie | check | check |
| "My Heart Is Refusing Me" (Alex P & Victory Version) | 2012 | Loreen | Heal | check | |
| "Hell Yeah" | 2012 | Midnight Red | TBD | check | check |
| "Whip It" | 2012 | Nicki Minaj | Pink Friday: Roman Reloaded | check | check |
| "Boys Will Be Boys" | 2012 | Paulina Rubio | Brava! Reload | check | check |
| "Fist Pump Jump Jump" | 2012 | Ying Yang Twins | TBD | check | check |
| "I Don't Wanna Go" | 2013 | Colette Carr | Skitszo | check | check |
| "Live it Up" (feat. Pitbull) | 2013 | Jennifer Lopez | TBD | check | check |
| "Can't Feel Love Tonight (feat. Andreas Wijk)" | 2013 | Kika | Alive | check | |
| "Love \ Life" (feat. Kika) | 2013 | John Mamann | Love Life | check | check |
| "Vivir Mi Vida" | 2013 | Marc Anthony | 3.0 | check | |
| "Red Cup" | 2013 | Katy Tiz | Far Away | check | |
| "Take Me Home" | 2013 | Midnight Red | Midnight Red | check | |
| "Unloved" | 2015 | Tamta | TBD | check | check |
| "Cool Me Down" | 2016 | Margaret | TBD | check | check |
| "Infinity" | 2016 | Mohombi | TBD | | check |
| "OMG" | 2016 | Arash feat. Snoop Dogg | TBD | check | check |
| "What You Do" | 2017 | Margaret | Monkey Business | | check |
| "6 in the Morning" (feat. Margaret) | 2017 | VAX | TBD | check | check |
| "Fireproof" (feat. Teddy Sky) | 2017 | VAX | TBD | check | check |
| "Call Me" (feat. MIMI) | 2017 | Neiked | TBD | check | check |
| "Fuego" | 2018 | Eleni Foureira | TBD | check | check |
| "Tómame" | 2018 | Eleni Foureira | TBD | check | check |
| "Replay" | 2019 | Tamta | TBD | check | check |
