= 2017 FIBA U16 African Championship =

2017 FIBA U16 AfroBasket
5th FIBA Under-16 African Basketball Championship

Tournament details
- Host country: Mauritius
- City: Vacoas-Phoenix
- Dates: 13–22 July
- Teams: 8 (from 1 confederation)
- Venue(s): 1 (in 1 host city)

Final positions
- Champions: Mali (1st title)

Tournament statistics
- MVP: (Mali) Siriman Kanouté
- Top scorer: (Mali) Kanouté (24.8)
- Top rebounds: (Egypt) Elmadawy (8.8)
- Top assists: (Madagascar) Tsarafeno (5.5)
- PPG (Team): Mali (95.4)
- RPG (Team): Mali (64.5)
- APG (Team): Egypt (17.3)

Official website
- www.fiba.basketball

The 2017 FIBA U16 African Championship, alternatively the 5th Afrobasket U16, was an international basketball competition held in Vacoas-Phoenix, Mauritius from 13–22 July 2017. It served as the qualifier for the 2018 FIBA Under-17 Basketball World Cup.

Mali claimed their first-ever under-16 continental title by dethroning the defending champions Egypt in the final, 76–65. Both teams will represent FIBA Africa to the Under-17 Basketball World Cup next year.

== Hosts selection ==
On 25 March 2016, FIBA Africa announced that Mauritius will be the organising country of the tournament.

== Venue ==
Vacoas-Phoenix	2017 FIBA U16 African Championship is located in Mauritius

== Qualification ==
Event	Date	Location	Vacancies	Qualified
2017 AfroBasket U16 Preliminaries Zone 1	Cancelled (Note: Competition was cancelled. Tunisia was the only team registered for the preliminaries, Algeria was added later.)	NA	2	Tunisia; Algeria
2017 AfroBasket U16 Preliminaries Zone 2	Cancelled (Note: Competition was cancelled. The qualifiers of this zone are cancelled as no team registered for the regional tournament. Mali was added later.)	NA	1	Mali
2017 AfroBasket U16 Preliminaries Zone 3	Cancelled (Note: Competition was cancelled. The qualifiers of this zone are cancelled as no team registered for the regional tournament. Ghana initially qualified as the sole representative but later withdrew.)	NA	1	NA
2017 AfroBasket U16 Preliminaries Zone 4	Cancelled (Note: Competition was cancelled. The qualifiers of this zone are cancelled as no team registered for the regional tournament.)	NA	1	NA
2017 AfroBasket U16 Preliminaries Zone 5	1–6 June 2017 (Note: Three countries participated: hosts Kenya, Tanzania and the eventual zone winner Rwanda. The tournament was played in round-robin format. Egypt was added later.)	(Kenya) Mombasa	2	Rwanda; Egypt
2017 AfroBasket U16 Preliminaries Zone 6	Cancelled (Note: Competition was cancelled. The qualifiers of this zone are cancelled as no team registered for the regional tournament. Zimbabwe initially qualified as the sole representative but later withdrew.)	NA	1	Mozambique
2017 AfroBasket U16 Preliminaries Zone 7	Cancelled (Note: Competition was cancelled. The qualifiers of this zone are cancelled as no team registered for the regional tournament. Mauritius qualified as the tournament hosts. Madagascar was added later.)	NA	1	Mauritius; Madagascar
Total			8	

== Participating teams ==
On the eve of the tournament, rosters were finalized for the following participating teams:

- Mauritius
- Mozambique
- Tunisia
- Mali
- Egypt
- Madagascar
- Rwanda
- Algeria

== Format ==
The eight teams will be divided into two groups. The Group Phase consists of two legs: for each of the teams per group, they will face each other twice. The top two teams of each group will advance to the Semifinals, and the bottom two teams of each group will move on to the Classification Round, both will be played in a knockout format.

== Draw ==
The draw for the main tournament was held on 12 July 2017 at Vacoas-Phoenix, Mauritius.

== Group phase ==
All times are in Mauritius Time (UTC+4:00)

=== Group A ===
Pos	Team	Pld	W	L	PF	PA	PD	Pts	Qualification
1	Mali	6	6	0	615	238	+377	12	Advance to Semifinals
2	Tunisia	6	4	2	381	265	+116	10	Advance to Semifinals
3	Mozambique	6	2	4	358	383	−25	8	Advance to Classification 5-8
4	Mauritius (H)	6	0	6	164	632	−468	6	Advance to Classification 5-8

Source: FIBA Africa
(H) Hosts

13 July
11:15

Box Scores

Tunisia	40–61	Mali
Scoring by quarter: 14–20, 14–17, 9–7, 3–17
Pts: Ghomrassi 14; Rebs: Tebai 7 Asts: Ghomrassi 2		Pts: Kanouté 21; Rebs: Ballo 16; Asts: A. Traore 3

Phoenix Gymnasium, Vacoas-Phoenix
Referees: Mohamed Elmenshawy (EGY), Didier Gaga (RWA), Walelign Fikadu Gebeto (ETH)

13 July
20:00

Box Scores

Mauritius	28–94	Mozambique
Scoring by quarter: 3–20, 7–29, 8–23, 10–22
Pts: Camal Boudou, Doorghen 8 Rebs: Camal Boudou 6 Asts: Wong Moi Sang 2		Pts: Ricotso 15; Rebs: Nhamussua 10; Asts: Chauque, Nhamussua 4

Phoenix Gymnasium, Vacoas-Phoenix
Referees: Fethi Chaib (ALG), Riadh Khalladi (TUN), Haja Maminiaini Ranaivoson (MAD)

14 July
17:45

Box Scores

Mali	108–51	Mozambique
Scoring by quarter: 36–6, 22–10, 19–17, 31–18
Pts: Dieng 19; Rebs: F. Traore 10; Asts: Dieng 6		Pts: Macie 9 Rebs: Buvana 8 Asts: 5 players 1

Phoenix Gymnasium, Vacoas-Phoenix
Referees: Didier Gaga (RWA), Cherubin Leslie (MRI), Haja Maminiaini Ranaivoson (MAD)

14 July
20:00

Box Scores

Tunisia	83–20	Mauritius
Scoring by quarter: 16–2, 19–4, 19–7, 29–7
Pts: Mnafedh 18; Rebs: Mehrez 8 Asts: Chebbi 4		Pts: Doorghen 10; Rebs: Perrine 9 Asts: Crudo 2

Phoenix Gymnasium, Vacoas-Phoenix
Referees: Fethi Chaib (ALG), Mohamed Elmenshawy (EGY), Zophila Emmanuel Mthembu (RSA)

15 July
17:45

Box Scores

Mozambique	60–67 (3OT)	Tunisia
Scoring by quarter: 9–13, 13–15, 13–7, 6–6, Overtime: 6–6, 6–6, 7–14
Pts: Buvana 16; Rebs: Ricotso 16; Asts: 6 players 1		Pts: Chebbi 15; Rebs: Rebai 14; Asts: Chebbi 3

Phoenix Gymnasium, Vacoas-Phoenix

15 July
20:00

Box Scores

Mauritius	23–165	Mali
Scoring by quarter: 2–49, 13–36, 6–31, 2–49
Pts: Sandian 5 Rebs: Perrine 7 Asts: 4 players 1		Pts: Kanouté 50; Rebs: Diarra 19; Asts: Kanouté 4

Phoenix Gymnasium, Vacoas-Phoenix

17 July
15:30

Box Scores

Tunisia	46–30	Mozambique
Scoring by quarter: 14–7, 13–7, 10–10, 9–6
Pts: Mehrez 10; Rebs: Mehrez 10; Asts: Chebbi 4		Pts: Buvana 10; Rebs: Buvana 11; Asts: Macie 2

Phoenix Gymnasium, Vacoas-Phoenix
Referees: Walelign Fikadu Gebeto (ETH), Erick Omondi Otieno (KEN), Haja Maminiaini Ranaivoson (MAD)

17 July
20:00

Box Scores

Mali	108–38	Mauritius
Scoring by quarter: 36–4, 27–0, 27–21, 18–13
Pts: Kanouté 27; Rebs: Sidibe 17; Asts: Kanouté, A. Traore, B. Coulibaly 4		Pts: Camal Boudou 11; Rebs: Armand 5 Asts: Wong Moi Sang 3

Phoenix Gymnasium, Vacoas-Phoenix
Referees: Fethi Chaib (ALG), Mohamed Elmenshawy (EGY), Didier Gaga (RWA)

18 July
15:30

Box Scores

Mozambique	40–103	Mali
Scoring by quarter: 7–25, 11–25, 17–26, 5–27
Pts: Buvana 12; Rebs: Buvana 5 Asts: Ussivane 3		Pts: Kanouté 26; Rebs: Ballo, Diarra 10; Asts: Kanouté 5

Phoenix Gymnasium, Vacoas-Phoenix
Referees: Fethi Chaib (ALG), Mohamed Elmenshawy (EGY), Zophila Emmanuel Mthembu (RSA)

18 July
20:00

Box Scores

Mauritius	24–99	Tunisia
Scoring by quarter: 1–20, 6–23, 10–26, 7–30
Pts: Crudo 10; Rebs: Coopen 5 Asts: Camal Boudou 2		Pts: Ben Amor 18; Rebs: Kacem, Chebbi 12; Asts: Gara, Chebbi, Tebai 2

Phoenix Gymnasium, Vacoas-Phoenix
Referees: Didier Gaga (RWA), Walelign Fikadu Gebeto (ETH), Haja Maminiaini Ranaivoson (MAD)

20 July
17:45

Box Scores

Mali	70–46	Tunisia
Scoring by quarter: 19–10, 26–12, 11–9, 14–15
Pts: Kanouté 23; Rebs: Sanogo 11; Asts: Dieng 2		Pts: Rebai 12; Rebs: Zaghouani 8 Asts: Rebai, Ghomrassi 3

Phoenix Gymnasium, Vacoas-Phoenix

20 July
20:00

Box Scores

Mozambique	83–31	Mauritius
Scoring by quarter: 19–11, 18–5, 27–6, 19–9
Pts: Ricotso 22; Rebs: Macie 12; Asts: 4 players 2		Pts: Wong Moi Sang, Doorghen 8 Rebs: Wong Moi Sang, Doorghen 6 Asts: Crudo 2

Phoenix Gymnasium, Vacoas-Phoenix

=== Group B ===
Pos	Team	Pld	W	L	PF	PA	PD	Pts	Qualification
1	Egypt	6	6	0	547	335	+212	12	Advance to Semifinals
2	Algeria	6	2	4	357	382	−25	8	Advance to Semifinals
3	Madagascar	6	2	4	440	506	−66	8	Advance to Classification 5-8
4	Rwanda	6	2	4	343	464	−121	8	Advance to Classification 5-8

Source: FIBA Africa

13 July
13:30

Box Scores

Rwanda	39–61	Algeria
Scoring by quarter: 2–20, 9–11, 15–12, 13–18
Pts: Nkundwa 19; Rebs: Nkundwa 9 Asts: Umuhoza, Mudenge 1		Pts: Bouzidi 16; Rebs: Gadaoui 8 Asts: Hifi, Gadaoui, Zitouni 2

Phoenix Gymnasium, Vacoas-Phoenix
Referees: Artur Cesar Bandeira de Castro (MOZ), Zophila Emmanuel Mthembu (RSA), Bennon Soobiah (MRI)

13 July
15:45

Box Scores

Egypt	117–63	Madagascar
Scoring by quarter: 25–16, 31–9, 22–17, 39–21
Pts: Hassan 19; Rebs: Elmadawy 9 Asts: Sakr 5		Pts: Rakotovao 18; Rebs: Rakotovao 7 Asts: Andrilova 3

Phoenix Gymnasium, Vacoas-Phoenix
Referees: Cherubin Leslie (MRI), Youssouf Maiga (MLI), Erick Omondi Otieno (KEN)

14 July
13:15

Box Scores

Rwanda	45–101	Egypt
Scoring by quarter: 9–31, 15–20, 6–25, 15–25
Pts: Umuhoza 13; Rebs: Nkundwa 9 Asts: 4 players 1		Pts: Hassan 17; Rebs: Elmadawy 11; Asts: Elmadawy, Mohamed, Khalifa 3

Phoenix Gymnasium, Vacoas-Phoenix
Referees: Walelign Fikadu Gebeto (ETH), Erick Omondi Otieno (KEN), Bennon Soobiah (MRI)

14 July
15:30

Box Scores

Algeria	60–59	Madagascar
Scoring by quarter: 13–13, 16–9, 14–17, 17–20
Pts: Bouzidi 14; Rebs: Bouzidi 9 Asts: Benzidoun 3		Pts: Jaoravo, Rakotovao 12; Rebs: Raharimanantoanina 17; Asts: Tsarafeno 4

Phoenix Gymnasium, Vacoas-Phoenix
Referees: Artur Cesar Bandeira de Castro (MOZ), Riadh Khalladi (TUN), Youssouf Maiga (MLI)

15 July
13:15

Box Scores

Madagascar	95–87	Rwanda
Scoring by quarter: 24–26, 18–21, 26–13, 27–27
Pts: Rakotovao 34; Rebs: Raharimanantoanina 7 Asts: Tsarafeno 8		Pts: Nkundwa 30; Rebs: Nkundwa 15; Asts: Nkundwa 3

Phoenix Gymnasium, Vacoas-Phoenix

15 July
17:45

Box Scores

Egypt	84–61	Algeria
Scoring by quarter: 22–14, 14–14, 21–16, 27–17
Pts: Ibrahim 24; Rebs: Elmadawy 12; Asts: Morsy 6		Pts: Gadaoui 17; Rebs: Bouzidi 8 Asts: Gadaoui, Bouzidi 3

Phoenix Gymnasium, Vacoas-Phoenix

17 July
13:15

Box Scores

Rwanda	73–70	Madagascar
Scoring by quarter: 20–17, 16–9, 20–19, 17–25
Pts: Ngoga 24; Rebs: Murengezi 19; Asts: Murengezi 4		Pts: Jaoravo 19; Rebs: Raharimanantoanina 9 Asts: Tsarafeno 7

Phoenix Gymnasium, Vacoas-Phoenix
Referees: Riadh Khalladi (TUN), Cherubin Leslie (MRI), Zophila Emmanuel Mthembu (RSA)

17 July
17:45

Box Scores

Algeria	49–65	Egypt
Scoring by quarter: 10–32, 13–11, 16–11, 10–21
Pts: Bouzidi 14; Rebs: Gadaoui, Hadji 7 Asts: Zitouni 3		Pts: Hassan 19; Rebs: Khalifa 9 Asts: Morsy 6

Phoenix Gymnasium, Vacoas-Phoenix
Referees: Artur Cesar Bandeira de Castro (MOZ), Youssouf Maiga (MLI), Bennon Soobiah (MRI)

18 July
13:15

Box Scores

Madagascar	78–71	Algeria
Scoring by quarter: 16–22, 12–11, 17–17, 33–21
Pts: Raharimanantoanina 23; Rebs: Raharimanantoanina 15; Asts: Rakotovao 4		Pts: Bouzidi 24; Rebs: Chenieff 8 Asts: Gadaoui 5

Phoenix Gymnasium, Vacoas-Phoenix
Referees: Walelign Fikadu Gebeto (ETH), Youssouf Maiga (MLI), Erick Omondi Otieno (KEN)

18 July
17:45

Box Scores

Egypt	82–42	Rwanda
Scoring by quarter: 32–13, 10–11, 17–10, 23–8
Pts: Elmadawy 18; Rebs: Khalifa 12; Asts: Elmadawy, Mohamed 4		Pts: Nkundwa 22; Rebs: Murengezi 10; Asts: Murengezi 3

Phoenix Gymnasium, Vacoas-Phoenix
Referees: Artur Cesar Bandeira de Castro (MOZ), Riadh Khalladi (TUN), Bennon Soobiah (MRI)

20 July
13:15

Box Scores

Madagascar	75–98	Egypt
Scoring by quarter: 24–23, 15–21, 14–21, 22–33
Pts: Tsarafeno 18; Rebs: Tsarafeno 10; Asts: Andrilova, Tsarafeno 4		Pts: Khalifa 18; Rebs: Elmadawy 9 Asts: Elmadawy 6

Phoenix Gymnasium, Vacoas-Phoenix

20 July
15:30

Box Scores

Algeria	55–57	Rwanda
Scoring by quarter: 13–10, 17–11, 13–19, 12–17
Pts: Gadaoui 15; Rebs: Chenieff 14; Asts: Gadaoui, Benzidoun 3		Pts: Umuhoza 16; Rebs: Nkundwa 16; Asts: Umuhoza 3

Phoenix Gymnasium, Vacoas-Phoenix

== Classification round ==
Classification 5th–8th
21 July
Mauritius	13
Madagascar	125
21 July
Rwanda	67
Mozambique	33

Fifth place
22 July
Madagascar	80
Rwanda	74
Seventh place
22 July
Mauritius	56
Mozambique	121

=== Classification 5–8 ===
21 July
13:15

Box Scores

Rwanda	67–33	Mozambique
Scoring by quarter: 13–8, 16–7, 23–15, 15–3
Pts: Nkundwa 22; Rebs: Nkundwa, Ngoga 15; Asts: Umuhoza, Nkundwa 5		Pts: Buvana 8 Rebs: Macie 6 Asts: Ussivane 3

Phoenix Gymnasium, Vacoas-Phoenix
Referees: Fethi Chaib (ALG), Youssouf Maiga (MLI), Erick Omondi Otieno (KEN)

21 July
15:30

Box Scores

Mauritius	13–125	Madagascar
Scoring by quarter: 0–31, 5–32, 8–33, 0–29
Pts: Perrine 4 Rebs: Camal Boudou 5 Asts: Wong Moi Sang 1		Pts: Rakotovao 33; Rebs: Andrilova, Andrianjafinoarivony 11; Asts: Raheriarison 8

Phoenix Gymnasium, Vacoas-Phoenix
Referees: Mohamed Elmenshawy (EGY), Didier Gaga (RWA), Riadh Khalladi (TUN)

=== Seventh place game ===
22 July
13:00

Box Scores

Mauritius	56–121	Mozambique
Scoring by quarter: 18–27, 11–28, 12–42, 15–24
Pts: Crudo 18; Rebs: Jhungur 6 Asts: Wong Moi Sang 4		Pts: Ricotso 36; Rebs: Ricotso 13; Asts: Clemente 4

Phoenix Gymnasium, Vacoas-Phoenix

=== Fifth place game ===
22 July
15:15

Box Scores

Madagascar	80–74	Rwanda
Scoring by quarter: 17–15, 16–20, 20–22, 27–17
Pts: Tsarafeno 20; Rebs: Raharimanantoanina 9 Asts: Tsarafeno 8		Pts: Nkundwa 24; Rebs: Ngoga 18; Asts: Umuhoza 6

Phoenix Gymnasium, Vacoas-Phoenix

== Final round ==
Semifinals
21 July
Mali	72
Algeria	62
21 July
Egypt	86
Tunisia	45

Final
22 July
Mali	76
Egypt	65
Third place
22 July
Algeria	57
Tunisia	54

=== Semifinals ===
21 July
17:45

Box Scores

Mali	72–62	Algeria
Scoring by quarter: 18–12, 16–13, 18–10, 20–27
Pts: Kanouté 19; Rebs: Ballo 19; Asts: Kanouté 4		Pts: Gadaoui 17; Rebs: Dahman 7 Asts: Benzidoun 6

Phoenix Gymnasium, Vacoas-Phoenix
Referees: Artur Cesar Bandeira de Castro (MOZ), Zophila Emmanuel Mthembu (RSA), Haja Maminiaini Ranaivoson (MAD)

21 July
20:00

Box Scores

Egypt	86–45	Tunisia
Scoring by quarter: 24–7, 19–11, 27–6, 16–21
Pts: Morsy 18; Rebs: Elmadawy, Noureldin 8 Asts: Elmadawy 5		Pts: Zaghouani 18; Rebs: Zaghouani 10; Asts: Gara, Chebbi 2

Phoenix Gymnasium, Vacoas-Phoenix
Referees: Walelign Fikadu Gebeto (ETH), Erick Omondi Otieno (KEN), Bennon Soobiah (MRI)

=== Third place game ===
22 July
17:30

Box Scores

Algeria	57–54	Tunisia
Scoring by quarter: 15–5, 18–0, 13–16, 11–33
Pts: Hifi, Gadaoui 15; Rebs: Chenieff 17; Asts: Gadaoui, Benzidoun 3		Pts: Rebai, Ghomrassi 15; Rebs: Ghomrassi 8 Asts: Mnafedh 3

Phoenix Gymnasium, Vacoas-Phoenix

=== Final ===
22 July
20:00

Box Scores

Mali	76–65	Egypt
Scoring by quarter: 22–19, 17–16, 21–15, 16–15
Pts: Kanouté 17; Rebs: Ballo 22; Asts: Kanouté 9		Pts: Hassan 22; Rebs: Elmadawy 9 Asts: Morsy 6

Phoenix Gymnasium, Vacoas-Phoenix

== Final ranking ==
Qualified to the 2018 FIBA Under-17 Basketball World Cup.

Rank	Team	Record
1st place, gold medalist(s)	Mali	8–0
2nd place, silver medalist(s)	Egypt	7–1
3rd place, bronze medalist(s)	Algeria	3–5
4	Tunisia	4–4
5	Madagascar	4–4
6	Rwanda	3–5
7	Mozambique	3–5
8	Mauritius	0–8

== Awards ==
2017 FIBA Under-16 African champions

Mali
1st title

Most Valuable Player
(Mali) Siriman Kanouté

=== All-Tournament Team ===
- (Mali) Siriman Kanouté (MVP)
- (Tunisia) Faiez Ghomrassi
- (Egypt) Aly Khalifa
- (Rwanda) Thierry Nkundwa
- (Mali) Oumar Ballo

== Statistical leaders ==
=== Individual tournament highs ===
Points

Rank	Name	G	Pts	PPG
1	(Mali) Siriman Kanouté	8	198	24.8
2	(Rwanda) Thierry Nkundwa	8	163	20.4
3	(Madagascar) Marco Rakotovao	8	138	17.3
4	(Egypt) Momen Hassan	8	125	15.6
5	(Algeria) Amir Bouzidi	6	87	14.5
6	(Mali) Oumar Ballo	8	115	14.4
7	(Madagascar) Sitraka Raharimanantoanina	8	114	14.3
8	(Algeria) Ouail Gadaoui	8	111	13.9
9	(Madagascar) Edito Tsarafeno	8	109	13.6
10	(Egypt) Aly Khalifa	8	106	13.3

Rebounds

Rank	Name	G	Rebs	RPG
1	(Mali) Oumar Ballo	8	102	12.2
2	(Rwanda) Thierry Nkundwa	8	93	11.6
3	(Rwanda) Brown Murengezi	8	86	10.8
4	(Rwanda) Elias Ngoga	8	84	10.5
5	(Egypt) Youssef Elmadawy	8	70	8.8
6	(Madagascar) Sitraka Raharimanantoanina	8	69	8.6
7	(Mozambique) Bryan Ricotso	8	66	8.3
8	(Mali) Adama Sanogo	8	64	8.0
9	(Mali) N'Tio Diarra	8	63	7.9
10	(Egypt) Aly Khalifa	8	61	7.6

Assists

Rank	Name	G	Asts	APG
1	(Madagascar) Edito Tsarafeno	8	44	5.5
2	(Mali) Siriman Kanouté	8	34	4.3
3	(Egypt) Omar Morsy	7	26	3.7
4	(Egypt) Youssef Elmadawy	8	27	3.4
5	(Algeria) Ouail Gadaoui	8	21	2.6
6	(Mali) Fousseny Dieng	8	20	2.5
7	(Mali) Wajih Chebbi	8	19	2.4
8	(Algeria) Abdelmalek Benzidoun	8	18	2.3
8	(Madagascar) Marco Rakotovao	8	18	2.3
8	(Rwanda) Jean Umuhoza	8	18	2.3
8	(Madagascar) Samuel Raheriarison	4	9	2.3
