= Sidi Mansour =

Sidi Mansour may refer to:

- Sidi Mansour, Morocco
- Sidi Mansour, a village in Bizerte Governorate, Tunisia
- "Sidi Mansour" (song), a Tunisian folk song
- Sidi Mansour, a small town in Sfax Governorate, Tunisia
- Sidi Mansour (album), a 2000 album by Saber Rebaï
- "Sidi Mansour", a song by Cheikha Rimitti
