= Parakseno sinesthima =

Parakseno sinesthima Παράξενο συναίσθημα

Studio album by Sarbel
- Released: 2005
- Recorded: 2005
- Genre: Modern laika, pop
- Label: Sony BMG Greece

Sarbel chronology
| Parakseno sinesthima Παράξενο συναίσθημα (2005) | Sahara (2001) |

Singles from Sarbel
- 1. "Se pira sovara" 2. "Sokolata"; 3. "Enas Apo Mas"; 4. "Thelo na petakso"

Alternative cover
- "Parakseno sinesthima: Special Edition"

Parakseno Sinesthima (in Greek Παράξενο συναίσθημα meaning Strange feeling) is the debut album of Greek Cypriot singer Sarbel, released in 2005 on the Sony BMG label. The album is in the Greek language and was certified gold. It was re-released in 2006 in a new edition including a greater number of songs and remixes.

Done mostly in a dance-pop style, the album uses many elements of traditional Greek music (laiki) in modern fashion as well as Middle Eastern music. The main success from the album was "Se pira sovara" (in Greek "Σε πήρα σοβαρά"), a cover of the traditional Tunisian song "Sidi Mansour" by Saber Rebaï. Another song from the album, "Skliri kardia" was also a Greek version of "Habibi Dah Nari Narien" made famous Hisham Abbas.

Four singles were released from the album: "Se Pira Sovara", "Sokolata", "Enas apo mas" and "Thelo na petakso".

== Track listings ==
=== Original release (2005) ===
- Skliri kardia (Habibi Dah Nari Narien)
- Se pira sovara (with Irini Merkouri)
- Paraxeno sinesthima
- Monaha esi
- De me niazi
- Sokolata
- Sopa
- Peripetia
- Zontanos nekros
- Ta psihologika sou
- Den boris
- Zo
- Adinaton
- Se pira sovara (Sfera mix by Nikos Nikolakopoulos)

=== Special edition (2006) ===
- Thelo na petaxo
- Boro Boro
- Sokolata (remix)
- Monaha esi (remix)
- Skliri kardia (Habibi Dah Nari Narien)
- Se pira sovara (with Irini Merkouri)
- Paraxeno sinesthima
- Monaha esi
- De me niazi
- Sokolata
- Sopa
- Peripetia
- Zontanos nekros
- Ta psihologika sou
- Den boris
- Zo
- Adinaton
- Se pira sovara (Sfera mix by Nikos Nikolakopoulos)
