= Oumar Ballo (basketball) =

Malian basketball player (born 2002)

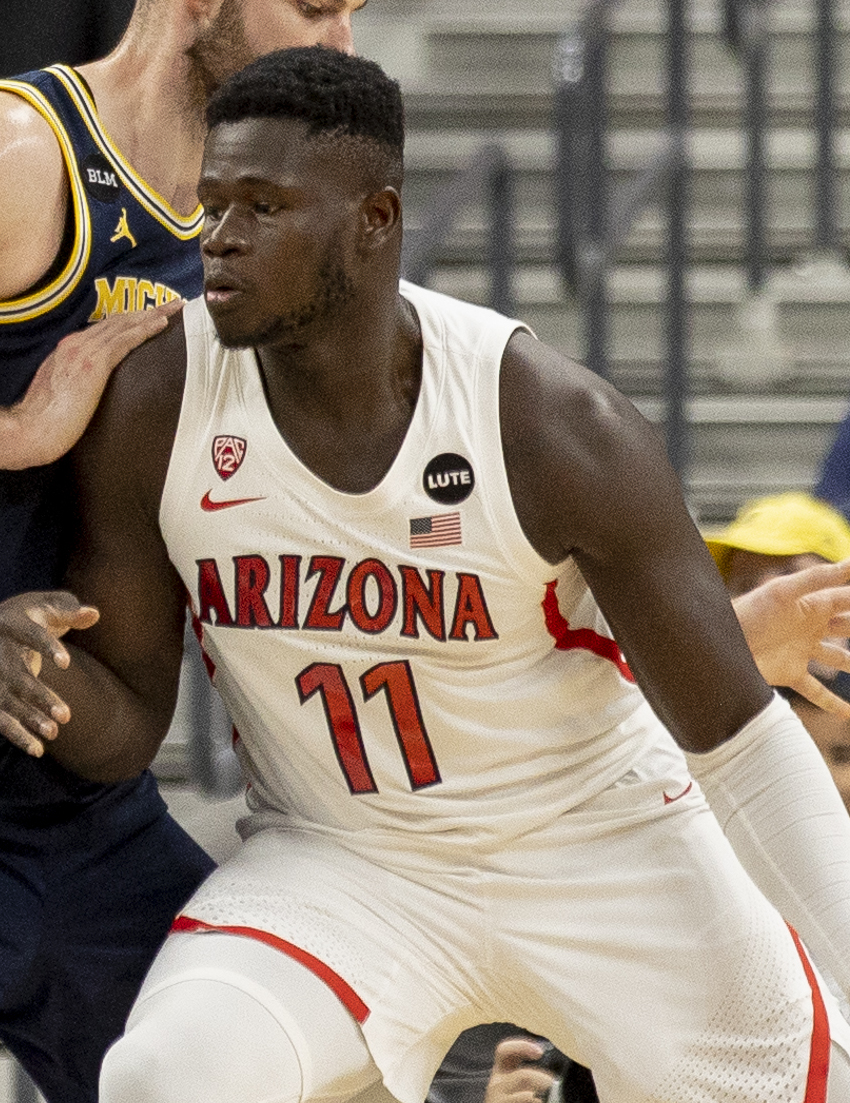
- Ballo with Arizona in 2021

No. 11 – Galatasaray
- Position: Center
- League: BSL; BCL

Personal information
- Born: 13 July 2002 (age 24) Koulikoro, Mali
- Listed height: 7 ft 0 in (2.13 m)
- Listed weight: 260 lb (118 kg)

Career information
- High school: Canterbury Academy (Las Palmas, Spain)
- College: Gonzaga (2020–2021); Arizona (2021–2024); Indiana (2024–2025)
- NBA draft: 2025: undrafted
- Playing career: 2025–present

Career history
- 2025–2026: Pallacanestro Cantù
- 2026: RSSB Tigers
- 2026–present: Valencia Basket
- 2026–present: →Galatasaray

Career highlights
- BAL champion (2026); 2× First-team All-Pac-12 (2023, 2024); Pac-12 Most Improved Player (2023); Pac-12 All-Defensive Team (2024); WCC All-Freshman Team (2021)
Medals
Men's basketball
Representing Mali
AfroBasket
| Silver medal – second place | 2025 Angola |
FIBA Under-19 World Cup
| Silver medal – second place | 2019 Greece | Team |
FIBA Africa U18 Championship
| Gold medal – first place | 2018 Mali | Team |
FIBA Africa U16 Championship
| Gold medal – first place | 2017 Mauritius |

Oumar Ballo (born 13 July 2002) is a Malian professional basketball player for Galatasaray of the Basketbol Süper Ligi (BSL) and the Basketball Champions League (BCL), on loan from Valencia Basket. He played college basketball for the Gonzaga Bulldogs, Arizona Wildcats, and Indiana Hoosiers. Listed at 7 feet 0 inches (2.13 m) and 260 pounds (118 kg), he plays the center position.

== Early life and career ==
Ballo grew up in Koulikoro, Mali. He played football as a goalkeeper but shifted his focus to basketball due to his exceptional height. His mother and brother, who had moved to France at age 15 to play the latter sport, encouraged him to switch to basketball. As a child, Ballo idolized National Basketball Association (NBA) player Shaquille O'Neal.

== High school career ==
When he was 11 years old, Ballo began training with coach Mohamed Diarra in his hometown, eventually earning an invitation from Canterbury Academy, a British private school in Las Palmas, Spain. He enrolled as a full-time student, despite not knowing Spanish or English, and started practicing basketball three times per day. In May 2017, Ballo was named most valuable player (MVP) of the Spain Under-16 Championship after helping Canterbury finish in third place, behind bigger clubs like Barcelona and Real Madrid, and leading the tournament in rebounds. In 2018, he averaged 15.1 points, 10.8 rebounds, and 2.3 blocks per game at the Spanish Junior Championship, earning MVP honors.

In October 2018, Ballo moved to NBA Academy Latin America, a training center in Mexico City sponsored by the NBA, CONADE, and Mexican Basketball Federation. He missed a large portion of the 2018–19 season with an ankle injury. In February 2019, Ballo played at the Basketball Without Borders camp at 2019 NBA All-Star Weekend in Charlotte, North Carolina, where he was one of the youngest participants.

=== Recruiting ===
In 2019, Ballo reclassified from the 2020 recruiting class to the 2019 class and was subsequently rated a four-star recruit by 247Sports and a five-star recruit by Rivals. On 23 February 2019, he verbally committed to Gonzaga over offers from Arizona and Baylor, among others.

College recruiting
| Name | Hometown | School | Height | Weight | Commit date |
|---|---|---|---|---|---|
| Oumar Ballo; C | Koulikoro, Mali | NBA Academy Latin America (MX) | 6 ft 10 in (2.08 m) | 245 lb (111 kg) | Feb 23, 2019 |
| Oumar Ballo; C | Recruit ratings: Rivals: 247Sports: ESPN: (—) | | | | |
Overall recruit ranking: Rivals: — 247Sports: 66 ESPN: —
Note: In many cases, Scout, Rivals, 247Sports, On3, and ESPN may conflict in their listings of height and weight.; In these cases, the average was taken. ESPN grades are on a 100-point scale.; Sources: "Gonzaga 2019 Basketball Commitments". Rivals.; "2019 Gonzaga Bulldogs Recruiting Class". ESPN.; "2019 Team Ranking". Rivals.

== College career ==
On 28 October 2019, Ballo was ruled an academic redshirt for the 2019–20 season by the National Collegiate Athletic Association. As a freshman, he averaged 2.5 points and 1.5 rebounds per game, earning West Coast Conference (WCC) All-Freshman Team honors. After the season, Ballo transferred to Arizona to play for head coach Tommy Lloyd, who had recruited him to Gonzaga. As a sophomore, Ballo averaged 6.8 points and 4.4 rebounds per game. He averaged 13.9 points and 8.6 rebounds per game as a junior, earning First Team All-Pac-12 as well as Pac-12 Most Improved Player honors.

== Professional career ==
=== Pallacanestro Cantù (2025–2026) ===
On July 19, 2025, he signed with Pallacanestro Cantù of the Italian Lega Basket Serie A (LBA).

=== RSSB Tigers (2026) ===
On 11 May 2026, Ballo signed with the RSSB Tigers of the Rwanda Basketball League (RBL) and the Basketball Africa League (BAL). On 31 May 2026, Ballo and the Tigers won the BAL Championship.

=== Valencia Basket (2026–present) ===
==== Loan to Galatasaray (2026–present) ====
On August 7, 2026, Ballo signed a three-year contract with Valencia Basket of the Spanish Liga ACB and the EuroLeague, but was loaned to Galatasaray of the Turkish Basketbol Süper Ligi (BSL) and the Basketball Champions League (BCL) for the 2026–27 season.

== National team career ==
Ballo played for Mali at the 2017 FIBA Under-16 African Championship in Vacoas-Phoenix, Mauritius. He averaged 14.4 points and 12.8 rebounds per game, winning the gold medal while making the tournament All-Star Five. Playing for Mali at the 2018 FIBA Under-17 World Cup in Argentina, Ballo averaged 20.6 points and a tournament-high 16.9 rebounds per game and was named to the All-Star Five. On 7 July 2018, he recorded 32 points and a tournament-record 32 rebounds in a 110–108 triple overtime loss to the Dominican Republic. Ballo won a gold medal with Mali at the 2018 FIBA Under-18 African Championship in Bamako, Mali. He averaged 8.5 points and six rebounds per game.

Ballo competed at the 2019 FIBA Under-19 World Cup in Heraklion, Greece, missing the first two games due to visa issues. In five games, he averaged 17.6 points, 11.8 rebounds, and 3.8 blocks per game, leading Mali to a silver medal, the best performance by an African team at a global basketball tournament. Ballo was named to the All-Star Five with teammate Siriman Kanouté.

Ballo played his first major senior tournament with Mali at FIBA AfroBasket 2025. He had 19 points in the semifinal win over Senegal, that secured Mali's first-ever AfroBasket final appearance. They fell to hosts Angola in the final, thus finishing as runners-up, the country's best performance in history.

== Career statistics ==
Legend
| GP | Games played | GS | Games started | MPG | Minutes per game |
| FG% | Field goal percentage | 3P% | 3-point field goal percentage | FT% | Free throw percentage |
| RPG | Rebounds per game | APG | Assists per game | SPG | Steals per game |
| BPG | Blocks per game | PPG | Points per game | **Bold** | Career high |

=== College ===
| Year | Team | GP | GS | MPG | FG% | 3P% | FT% | RPG | APG | SPG | BPG | PPG |
|---|---|---|---|---|---|---|---|---|---|---|---|---|
| 2019–20 | Gonzaga | Redshirt | | | | | | | | | | |
| 2020–21 | Gonzaga | 24 | 0 | 6.3 | .629 | – | .552 | 1.5 | .1 | .2 | .3 | 2.5 |
| 2021–22 | Arizona | **37** | 0 | 15.2 | .622 | – | **.701** | 4.4 | .6 | .4 | 1.2 | 6.8 |
| 2022–23 | Arizona | 35 | 35 | 27.6 | .647 | – | .565 | 8.6 | 1.6 | .7 | **1.3** | **14.2** |
| 2023–24 | Arizona | 36 | **36** | 26.0 | **.658** | – | .495 | **10.1** | .8 | **.9** | **1.3** | 12.9 |
| 2024–25 | Indiana | 31 | 29 | **28.9** | .623 | – | .571 | 9.1 | **2.1** | .7 | **1.3** | 13.0 |
| Career | | 163 | 100 | 21.5 | .640 | – | .565 | 7.0 | 1.1 | .6 | 1.1 | 10.3 |

== Personal life ==
Ballo's father and mother stand 2.03 m (6 ft 8 in) and 1.96 m (6 ft 5 in) respectively. His older brother, Drissa, who stands 2.08 m (6 ft 10 in), played professional basketball in France.
