= Siriman Kanouté =

Malian basketball player (born 2001)

Orléans Loiret Basket
- Position: Point guard
- League: LNB Pro B

Personal information
- Born: 25 September 2001 (age 25) Bamako, Mali
- Listed height: 1.83 m (6 ft 0 in)

Career information
- Playing career: 2020–present

Career history
- 2020–2022: SLUC Nancy
- 2022: Kaysersberg
- 2022–2023: Besançon
- 2023–2025: AMSB
- 2025–present: Orléans Loiret Basket

Career highlights
- FIBA Africa Under-18 Championship MVP (2018); FIBA Africa Under-16 Championship MVP (2017)
Medals
Men's basketball
Representing Mali
AfroBasket
| Silver medal – second place | 2025 Angola |
FIBA Under-19 World Cup
| Silver medal – second place | 2019 Greece | Team |
FIBA Africa U18 Championship
| Gold medal – first place | 2018 Mali |
FIBA Africa U16 Championship
| Gold medal – first place | 2017 Mauritius |

Siriman Kanouté (born 25 September 2001) is a Malian professional basketball player for Orléans Loiret Basket of the Pro B. He has starred for the Malian national junior teams on several occasions.

== Early life and career ==
Kanouté grew up playing both football and basketball. He learned how to play basketball from his father, a former player, and soon began playing the sport for the club AS Real Bamako. In 2018, Kanouté signed a four-year contract with SLUC Nancy Basket in France.

== Professional career ==
On 23 April 2021, Kanouté made his professional debut for SLUC Nancy, as he recorded 2 minutes in a LNB Pro B game against Saint-Chamond Basket. Over the 2020–21 season, he played in a total of 33 minutes in which he had 9 points and 8 assists.

On June 8, 2025, he signed with Orléans Loiret Basket of the Pro B.

== National team career ==
=== Junior teams ===
Kanouté made his national team debut with the Malian under-16 team at the 2017 FIBA Under-16 African Championship in Vacoas-Phoenix, Mauritius. On 15 July 2017, he recorded a career-high 50 points and 11 steals in a 165–23 victory over Mauritius. Kanouté averaged a tournament-high 24.8 points, 4.5 steals, and 4.2 assists per game, leading Mali to their first gold medal at the tournament and earning most valuable player (MVP) honors. He joined Mali at the 2018 FIBA Under-17 World Cup in Argentina. On 30 June 2018, Kanouté recorded 37 points, tied for fourth-most in a game in tournament history, six rebounds, and five assists in an 89–77 loss to Serbia. He averaged a tournament-high 24.6 points, 4.4 rebounds, and 3.9 steals per game.

Kanouté played for the Malian national under-18 team at the 2018 FIBA Under-18 African Championship in Bamako. He averaged a team-high 14.3 points, 5.4 assists, and 4.4 rebounds per game, leading his team to its first gold medal at the tournament. Kanouté posted 10 points, six rebounds, and five assists against Senegal in the finals and was named tournament MVP. He later took part in the 2019 FIBA Under-19 World Cup in Heraklion, Greece. In seven games, Kanouté averaged 15.4 points, 5.1 assists, and 2.4 steals per game, helping Mali capture an unlikely silver medal, the best performance by an African team at the tournament. He was named to the All-Star Five with teammate Oumar Ballo.

=== Senior team ===
Kanouté was selected for the Mali senior team at age 19 to play at AfroBasket 2021. There, Kanouté led his country both in scoring and assists, with 14 points and 3.7 assists per game.

== Personal life ==
Kanouté's father Séga Kanouté played basketball for AS Real Bamako and the Malian senior national team. Séga is a board member on the Mali Basketball Federation and coaches both the AS Real women's basketball team and Malian men's national junior teams.
