= Ritza Papaconstantinou =

Greek-Swedish television presenter

Ritza Papaconstantinou (Greek: Ρίτσα Παπακωνσταντίνου; born in Brännkyrka, Sweden on 2 March 1972) is a famous Greek-Swedish television presenter at SVT since 2004. She has also taken acting roles in television series most notably Känd från TV.

She is the sister of the Swedish-Greek songwriter and record producer Alex Papaconstantinou.
