= ENISA =

ENISA may refer to:

- ENISA (singer) (born 1996), American singer
- European Union Agency for Cybersecurity
