= Aneta (album) =

Studio album by Irini Merkouri
- Released: December 2005
- Genres: Pop, Dance, Modern Laika
- Label: Sony BMG Greece/Columbia

Irini Merkouri chronology
Palirroia (2004)	Aneta (2005)	Argises (2006)

Aneta (Comfortably) is an album by popular Greek singer Irini Merkouri that was released in Greece, 2005 by Sony BMG Greece. It includes 7 new tracks along with Merkouri's greatest hits to date.

== Track listing ==
1. "Aneta"
2. "Mazi Den Kanoume Ke Horia De Boroume" (Tzini Magiko)
3. "Thelo Gia Mia Stigmi"
4. "Mia Kardia"
5. "Tha Sou To Filao"
6. "Ela Edo Kardia Mou"
7. "Kati Eho Pathi Me Ta Matia Sou"
8. "Ematha Na Zo Horis Esena"
9. "Meine Mazi Mou Apopse"
10. "Dio Mas" (featuring Antonis Remos)
11. "Foties Anapste"
12. "Krata Me Ksana"
13. "Osa Ferni I Ora" (featuring Kostas Doxas)
14. "Pou Na Fantasto"
15. "Palirroia"
16. "Syntelia"
17. "Agapi Mou Esi" (featuring Sarbel)
18. "Ki An Tora De Thimase"
19. "Agie Mou Vasili" (Bonus Track)
