= Nai (song) =

Single by Irini Merkouri
- Released: December 2007 (Greece)
- Recorded: 2007
- Genre: Pop; modern laika; dance
- Label: Sony BMG/Columbia

"Nai" ("Yes") is a CD single by Greek singer Irini Merkouri, released in December 2007 by Sony BMG Greece.

== Track listing ==
1. "Kane Ena Tsigaro"
2. "Nai"

== Charts ==
Chart	Providers	Peak position	Weeks on chart	Certification
Greek Singles Chart	IFPI	2	15	—
