= Henrietta, Mauritius =

Hamlet in Mauritius

Coordinates: 20°20′S 57°28′E

Henrietta is a hamlet in the town of Vacoas-Phoenix, Mauritius. It is the site of an 8-MW solar power plant established in 2023.

== Population and terrain ==
Henrietta consists of a population of different social levels. In recent years, it has seen a vast increase in the size of its population with morcellements and NHDC houses constructed. It is said to be the 'finishing part' of Vacoas as beyond it there is only forest.

== Economy ==
A large part of Henrietta consists of sugar cane plantation. It has a bus station which gives access to route lines towards Port Louis, Vacoas Central, St Pierre, Ebene and Curepipe.

In 2023, an 8-MW solar power plant was established in Henrietta, with assistance from India.
