= Enisa (singer) =

American singer and songwriter (born 1996)

ENISA
- Born: Enisa Nikaj; March 5, 1996 (age 30); Brooklyn, New York, U.S.
- Genres: Pop
- Occupations: Singer; songwriter
- Years active: 2015–present
- Labels: Highbridge The Label; Atlantic
- Website: enisamusic.com

Enisa Nikaj (/ɛniːsɑː ˈniːkaɪ/; born March 5, 1996), mononymously known as Enisa (stylized in all caps), is an American singer and songwriter. She began her music career in 2015 performing cover songs and began releasing original music in 2016. She signed to Atlantic Records and Highbridge The Label in December 2019, and competed in the American Song Contest in March 2022.

== Early life ==
Enisa Nikaj was born in Brooklyn, New York to Albanian parents from Tuzi, Montenegro. Her father emigrated from the SFR Yugoslavia to the United States at the age of 25, and was later followed by her mother. Enisa is a middle child, and has an older and a younger brother, both of whom took up playing basketball while Enisa leaned towards music. She began singing at home as a young child. Enisa attended PS 130 The Parkside elementary school, where she participated in theater and the school choir, graduating as valedictorian. At age seven, she played the role of Dorothy in a school play of The Wizard of Oz in the fourth grade.

Enisa attended I.S. 259 William McKinley Junior High School, where she was in a rock band, and Edward R. Murrow High School, graduating in 2015. Rapper Joey Badass was one of her schoolmates. She attended Brooklyn College, graduating early with a bachelor's degree in business administration in May 2018. She plays the piano, and has done internships at advertising agencies. Enisa grew up listening to Albanian music, in addition to artists such as Frank Sinatra, Nina Simone and Justin Timberlake. She has cited Adele and Amy Winehouse as her inspirations.

== Musical career ==
=== 2015–2017: Beginnings ===
In 2015, Enisa began performing cover songs to artists such as David Guetta and Sia ("Titanium"), Hozier ("Take Me to Church"), Justin Timberlake ("Cry Me a River") and Adele ("Hello"). After graduating from high school she had wanted to get into the music industry, and filmed her first video with a photographer friend who wanted to get into videography. Her cover of Hozier's song hit 100,000 views on YouTube within three months, while a reupload posted by a Facebook page amassed one million views in three days. Enisa has stated in interviews that her lack of connections in the industry prompted her to post herself performing cover songs as a way to showcase her talent and she hoped that it would grab the attention of a music producer or a manager.

The whole experience helped me realize that I don't need to rely on anyone for anything but myself, because I have the power to achieve whatever my heart desires, as long as I believe in myself first.

— Enisa on her writing "Burn This Bridge".

In 2016, she released her debut single "Burn This Bridge" on September 15, with the music video releasing on November 23. Enisa had been inspired to write the song after being discouraged by someone in the industry who she thought would help her instead tell her that "I didn't have what it takes and I wasn't good enough basically ... I just took it out on the studio. I wrote a song and I was feeling it like 'I don't need you, I could do this on my own.'" The song went on to be used in a Beats Electronics advertisement starring soccer player Alex Morgan in June 2017.

In 2017, she released her sophomore single "Glory Days" on May 26. It went on to be her first placement in a film soundtrack when it was featured in the opening scene of Miss Virginia (2019). Enisa released her third single "Freedom" on August 25, with the music video releasing on September 10. She was featured on Statik Selektah's single "Ain't a Damn Thing Change," alongside G-Eazy and Joey Badass, released on November 30.

=== 2018–2019: Record deal ===
Enisa released her fourth single "Reunite" and its music video on February 4, 2018. It was a tribute song to her uncle who had died years earlier. After graduating from college in May, she began pursuing her music career full-time at age 22. On October 18, she teased a collaboration track with French singer Scridge, which went on to be "Karma (Remix)". Following prolonged delays, Enisa confirmed in June 2019 that the French label had canceled its release. After the track was leaked in October 2019, it was officially released on November 15. Enisa performed a number of cover songs from 2018 through 2020, one of which was her cover of "Mockingbird" by Eminem that she released on December 9, 2018, which went on to amass 10 million views on YouTube by December 2020.

In 2019, she released her fifth single "Wait For Love" and its music video on July 6. Enisa was featured on Termanology and Dame Grease's single "Travel The World", alongside Bun B, released on September 19, with the music video releasing on January 29, 2020. She released her sixth single "Something Beautiful" and its music video on December 15, being a tribute to the victims of the 2019 Albania earthquake which had struck on November 26.

A person connected to Highbridge the Label had heard Enisa's music in 2017 while at a Philippe Chow restaurant in Manhattan, New York. A waiter had been playing "Freedom" and introduced him to Enisa's music after being asked about it. Enisa was eventually invited to the studio by rapper A Boogie wit da Hoodie and his team in January 2018. Over a year later, while she was speaking with RCA Records, Enisa had a chance encounter with A Boogie and was invited to the studio again to play her unreleased music. She was later introduced to higher-ups at Atlantic Records and was eventually offered a contract in May 2019, and subsequently signed her first record deal on December 6, 2019.

=== 2020–2021: Breakout singles ===
In 2020, she released her seventh single "Love Cycle" and its music video on September 18. After it went viral and gained particular attention among Nigerian fans, she adopted the name 'Eniola' in their honor in December 2020. Enisa released her eighth single "Dumb Boy" and its music video on November 20. She recorded the song at home due to the COVID-19 pandemic which forced her to become proficient with video editing and Ableton audio software. Enisa styled her own hair and makeup, and recorded, edited and color corrected all her video releases that year. Both music videos went on to amass 12 millions views each on YouTube within a year from their respective releases.

In 2021, she was featured on Tanzanian singer Rayvanny's "Number One (Remix)" released on February 1, with the music video releasing on February 24. Enisa released her ninth single "Count My Blessings" and its music video on February 26. The song sampled Tunisian singer Saber Rebaï's rendition of "Sidi Mansour." Enisa released her single "Love Cycle (Remix)" featuring Nigerian singer Davido on March 26. She released her tenth solo single "Tears Hit The Ground" and its music video on July 4, which went on to serve as the lead single for her debut EP released in 2022. A live acoustic version of the song was released on October 28, 2021.

=== 2022–present: Fake Love EP ===
In 2022, Enisa released her debut EP titled Fake Love on February 18. The music video for "One Thing" was released on January 28 and for "Get That Money" was released on February 18. On March 3, Enisa was announced as one of the contestants to compete in the American Song Contest, representing New York state. On October 14, she stated in a tweet that she was supposed to represent Montenegro in the Eurovision Song Contest 2023 in Liverpool, shortly after the country's broadcaster announced that it would not be participating.

== Modeling career ==
Enisa was the cover model on the annual 2014 edition of Prom Guide magazine. In November 2013, she had been shortlisted as one of the top five contestants selected from nationwide submissions before gracing the cover in January 2014 and winning a $5,000 scholarship. After her foray into music in 2015, Enisa was approached through social media by record labels and managers. She chose to sign with Wilhelmina Models in January 2016 and was managed by Bobby Gutierrez. During this period, she appeared in fashion magazine editorials for C-Heads in February 2016, Vulkan in April 2016, Slimi in November 2016, and Twelv in October 2017.

She has described her style as being "timeless and classic with a modern edge and a hint of Brooklyn attitude," and as being "more conservative. Rather than being flashy and all that. But it's very New York City." Enisa describes the city as her biggest inspiration, "I'm influenced just by walking down the street in SoHo or on 5th Avenue. I just get influenced by so many people," and admires the style of Victoria Beckham. Enisa is known for her long hair as her signature look. When asked about it in 2021, she stated that she avoids heat treatments and receives a haircut each month, with only her mother being allowed to cut her hair.

She appeared in the promotional campaign for Puma's "GRL PWR" Nova sneaker in January 2019. She appeared in editorials for Flaunt in March 2021, and Out Now in June 2021.

== Discography ==
=== Extended play ===
- Fake Love (2022)

=== Singles ===
==== As lead artist ====
- 2016: "Burn This Bridge"
- 2017: "Glory Days"
- 2017: "Freedom"
- 2018: "Reunite"
- 2019: "Something Beautiful"
- 2019: "Wait for Love"
- 2020: "Love Cycle"
- 2020: "Dumb Boy"
- 2020 : "Green Light "
- 2021: "Count My Blessings"
- 2021: "Love Cycle (Remix)" (ft. Davido)
- 2021: "Tears Hit the Ground"
- 2022: "One Thing"
- 2022: "Get That Money"
- 2022: "OLÉ"
- 2024: "Allo" (with Anastasia)
- 2024: "Disco Cone (Take It High)" (ft. Wenzl McGowen)
- 2024: "Tears Don't Fall" (ft. Kaskade)
- 2025: "Bukuri"
- 2025: "Boys"
- 2026: "Under Water"

==== As featured artist ====
- 2017: "Ain't A Damn Thing Change" (Statik Selektah featuring G-Eazy, Joey Badass, Enisa)
- 2019: "Travel the World" (Termanology, Dame Grease featuring Bun B, Enisa)
- 2019: "Karma (Remix)" (Scridge, Enisa, Ghenda)
- 2021: "Number One (Remix)" (Rayvanny featuring Enisa)
- 2023: "Blazin" (Timmy Trumpet, Tinie Tempah featuring Enisa)

=== Charted singles ===
==== As lead artist ====
List of charted singles as lead artist, with selected chart positions, showing year released and album name
Title	Year	Peak chart positions					Album
Title	Year	CIS Air.	EST Air.	KAZ Air.	PER Ang. Air.	RUS Air.	Album
"Just a Kiss (Muah)"	2022	153	—	91	—	167	Non-album singles
"La Dadi"	2024	—	134	—	—	—	Non-album singles
"Pretty Please"	2025	—	—	—	11	—	Non-album singles
"—" denotes items which were not released in that country or failed to chart.

==== As featured artist ====
List of charted singles as featured artist, with selected chart positions, showing year released and album name
Title	Year	Peak chart positions					Album
Title	Year	EST Air.	FIN Air.	LAT Air.	LTU Air.	NOR Air.	Album
"Fool 4 U" (Galantis and Jvke featuring Enisa)	2023	—	—	10	135	—	Non-album single
"Be Your Friend" (Cheat Codes and Edward Maya featuring Enisa)	2025	41	4	—	—	47	Non-album single
"—" denotes items which were not released in that country or failed to chart.
