= Argises =

Studio album by Irini Merkouri
- Released: November 2006
- Genres: Pop, Dance, Modern Laika
- Length: 50:17
- Label: Sony BMG Greece/Columbia

Irini Merkouri chronology
Aneta (2005)	Argises (2006)

Argises (You Were Late) is the last album released by Greek popular singer Irini Merkouri. It was released in Greece in November 2006 by Sony BMG Greece.

== Track listing ==
1. "Kati Trehi" - 3:52
2. "Miso Lepto" - 3:16
3. "Pame Gi'alla" - 4:26
4. "Den Ehoume Pia Tipota Na Poume" - 3:33
5. "Ase Me Na Figo" - 3:36
6. "Argises" - 4:01
7. "Oti Pis" - 3:21
8. "Kane Me Oti Thes" - 3:59
9. "Ena Adio Kitrino Taxi" - 4:11
10. "I Zoi Einai Oraia" - 4:23
11. "Oute Fili Oute Ehthroi" - 3:33
12. "Epanastato" - 3:40
13. "Anemos" - 4:34
