= Sidi Mansour (song) =

Folkloric song from Tunisia

"Sidi Manṣour"
- Traditional Tunisia folk song
- Native name: سيدي منصور
- Language: Tunisian Arabic

Music video
- "Sidi Mansour" on YouTube

"Sidi Manṣour" (Tunisian Arabic: سيدي منصور) is a traditional song from Tunisia with widespread recognition.

Many different versions of the song have been recorded over the years. The song became famous in 2000 when Tunisian singer Saber Rebaï released his version. Since then, many other singers have recorded songs based on 'Sidi Mansour'. These songs have been recorded in Arabic and many other languages. In 2021, Brooklyn-based singer Enisa Nikaj released a song called 'Count My Blessings', inspired by 'Sidi Mansour'. Boney M.'s song 'Ma Baker' was also inspired by this folk song.

Rebaï's "Sidi Mansour" song should not, however, be confused with the unrelated "Sidi Mansour" by Algerian raï artist Cheikha Rimitti.

== History ==
There are many different versions of the song with similar lyrics, and they date back hundreds of years. The song is dedicated to the Tunisian Sufi saint Sidi Mansour, whose name was Mansour Ghulam, and who lived before the 15th century.

== Versions prior to Saber Rebaï ==
The song was recorded by Moḥammed Jarrari (Arabic: محمّد الجراري) in his album Folklore tunisien (Arabic: فولكلور تونسي) as "Sidi Manṣour Baba Baḥri" (Arabic: سيدي منصور بابا بحري).

A version was recorded in 1975 by Moḥamed Ḥanesh (Arabic: محمد الحنش).

== Saber Rebaï version ==
"سيدي منصور"

Single by Saber Rebaï

from the album Sidi Mansour
- Language: Arabic
- English title: "Sidi Manṣour"
- Released: 2000
- Recorded: 2000
- Genre: Pop
- Composer: Tunisian folk music
- Lyricist: Sameh al Ajamai
- Producer: Hamid al Sha'iri

Saber Rebaï popularised the song when he recorded it for his 2000 album of the same name. Sameh al Ajami wrote the lyrics and Hamid al Sha'iri produced the record, which is based on a traditional Tunisian folk song. The popular music video was directed by Fadi Kenaan. The song is also known by the alternative titles 'Allah Allah, ya baba' and 'Sidi Mansour (ya baba)', both of which feature multiple times in the lyrics.

== Sarbel version ==
"Σε πήρα σοβαρά"

Single by Sarbel

from the album Parakseno sinesthima (Παράξενο συναίσθημα)
- Language: Greek, Arabic
- English title: "Se pira sovara"
- Released: 2004
- Recorded: 2004
- Genre: Pop
- Songwriter: Tunisian folk music

Sarbel singles chronology
"Σε πήρα σοβαρά" (2004)	"Sokolata" (2005)

Music video
- "Se Pira Sovara" on YouTube

"Se Pira Sovara" (Greek: Σε πήρα σοβαρά, meaning "I took you seriously") is the debut single by Greek Cypriot singer Sarbel, released in 2004 from his debut album Parakseno sinesthima (Παράξενο συναίσθημα). It is based on Tunisian singer Saber Rebaï's Arabic song "Sidi Mansour". "Se Pira Sovara" is a bilingual song in Greek and Arabic and became highly successful in Greece and Cyprus.

The song features Greek singer Irini Merkouri, who first introduced the young singer Sarbel to fans in Greece, but also across the Middle East. A music video was also shot for the song.

The album also contains a remixed version titled "Se pira sovara (Diva) (Sidi Mansour) - Sfera Mix" by Nikos Nikolakopoulos.

=== Charts ===
Chart (2004–05)	Peak position
Greece (IFPI)	2

== Zack Knight version ==
"Ya Baba"

Single by Zack Knight featuring Rami Beatz
- Language: Arabic, English
- Released: 2016
- Recorded: 2016
- Genre: Pakistani pop
- Label: Zack Knight
- Composer: Tunisian folk music
- Lyricist: Zack Knight
- Producers: Rami Beatz, Dot Da Genius

Music video
- "Ya Baba" on YouTube

"Ya Baba" is a bilingual English-Arabic song released in 2016 by the Pakistani-British artist Zack Knight, featuring Rami Beatz. It is largely based on the Arabic song 'Sidi Mansour' by Tunisian singer Saber Rebaï and samples it. Zack Knight wrote the additional lyrics. The song was produced by Rami Beatz and Dot Da Genius, and is copyrighted to Quantize Music LLC. It was highly successful on the UK's Official Asian Download Chart Top 40, published by the Official Charts Company, reaching number two. It remained on the chart for 13 weeks. The song also received heavy airplay in South Asian venues and on radio stations throughout the Middle East. An Arab-themed music video was also released.

== Other versions and sampling ==
The song has been subject to a huge number of interpretations by Arab and international artists and remixes by many DJs in original Arabic version and in other languages.

Most notably, it became the basis for the Boney M. hit "Ma Baker" in 1977 largely based on the 1975 hit by Mohamed Hanesh.

Parts of the song have also been sampled many times in other released songs in Arabic and other languages.

- Arabic versions were done by Bled Runner featuring Dida Brother (on the album The Rough Guide to Arabesque), by Cheb Rayan featuring Rima and a mix by Malik Adouane.
- Instrumental versions were done by Omar Khorshid.
- Hakim also recorded a version of this song mixing flamenco elements with Spanish and Arabic lyrics.
- Robert Plant performed "Sidi Mansour" with Juldeh Camara at World of Music, Arts and Dance (WOMAD) in Abu Dhabi.
- "Se Pira Sovara" is a version recorded in Greek and Arabic in 2004 by Sarbel and was a big hit for him in Greece.
- "Mariš li" (in Serbian Мариш ли) is a Serbian language song sung by Viki Miljković, using the music of "Sidi Mansour" taken from her 2003 album of the same name.
- "Mavişim" is a Turkish song sung by İbrahim Tatlıses using the music of "Sidi Mansour". It is found on his album Yetmez mi.
- "Za Yam Maghror Laila" with the music of "Sidi Mansour" is a Pakistani song sung by various artists in Urdu / Pashto.
- Mario Più and Mauro Picotto released the song "Arabian Pleasures" in 1999 which uses the melody of "Sidi Mansour". A vocal version was later contributed by Egyptian/Algerian singer Amal Wahby.
- "Allah Allah Ne Zaman" is a Turkish song sung by Güzin and Baha using the music of "Sidi Mansour".
- "Shpirti im" is an Albanian song sung by Ervis Bix using the music of "Sidi Mansour".
- "PAF.no", a song by the Norwegian rap duo Karpe, has a chorus containing parts of the song.
- ”Count My Blessings” by Enisa, an Albanian-American pop singer.
- ”Ela Ela” by Tita, a Bulgarian chalga and pop singer.
- "Nachave Nizam Pori" sung by Adnan Sami and Suneeta Rao in the Indian Telugu language movie Varsham.
