= Palirroia =

Palirroia Παλίρροια

Studio album by Irini Merkouri
- Released: 9 July 2004
- Studio: Sofita studio Argyriou Recordings studio
- Genre: Pop, Dance, Modern laika
- Length: 1:00:44
- Language: Greek
- Label: Sony Music Greece; Columbia
- Producer: Yiannis Doulamis

Irini Merkouri chronology
Meine Mazi Mou Apopse (2003)	Palirroia; Παλίρροια (2004)	Aneta (2005)

Singles from Palirroia
- 1. "Pou Na Fantasto" Released: June 2004; 2. "Palirroia" Released: September 2004; 3. "Ela" Released: October 2004; 4. "Krata Me Xana" Released: November 2004

Palirroia (Greek: Παλίρροια; English: Tide) is the third studio album by Greek singer Irini Merkouri. It was released on 9 July 2004 by Sony Music Greece and later received gold certification, selling 20,000 units. It also contains a cover from a Once Upon a Time in Mexico's soundtrack "Siente Mi Amor", adapted and arranged by Marios Psimopoulos.

== Tracklist ==
No.	Title	Lyrics	Music	Length
1.	"Pou Na Fantasto" (Που Να Φανταστώ; How Can I Imagine)	Evi Droutsa	Marios Psimopoulos	4:27
2.	"Ela" (Έλα; Come)	Tasos Vougiatzis	Elias Pantazopoulos	4:00
3.	"Krata Me Xana" (Κράτα Με Ξανά; Hold Me Again)	Takis Damashis	Takis Damashis	4:03
4.	"Palirroia" (Παλίρροια; Tide)	Evi Droutsa	Marios Psimopoulos	4:19
5.	"Siko Horepse" (Σήκω Χόρεψε; Get Up Dance)	Tasos Vougiatzis	Elias Pantazopoulos	3:52
6.	"Erotas Pikros" (Έρωτας Πικρός; Love Bitter)	Eleni Yiannatsoulia	Vaggelis Vasiliou	3:56
7.	"Kokkino Feggari" (Κόκκινο Φεγγάρι; Red Moon)	Antonis Villiotis	Robert Rodriguez; Jose Tamez	3:48
8.	"Kane Me Eftihismeni" (Κάνε Με Ευτυχισμένη; Make Me Be Happy)	Tasos Vougiatzis	Solon Apostolakis; Tasos Vougiatzis	3:21
9.	"Adiexodo" (Αδιέξοδο; Deadlock)	Tasos Vougiatzis	Solon Apostolakis; Tasos Vougiatzis	3:51
10.	"Dos' Mou Fotia" (Δωσ' Μου Φωτιά; Give Me Fire)	Eleni Yiannatsoulia	Vaggelis Vasiliou	5:11
11.	"Trito Mpoukali" (Τρίτο Μπουκάλι; Third Bottle)	Eleni Yiannatsoulia	Vaggelis Vasiliou	3:56
12.	"Aliti Mou" (Αλήτη Μου; My Bum)	Tasos Vougiatzis	Solon Apostolakis; Tasos Vougiatzis	4:02
13.	"Eheis Osa Zito" (Έχεις Όσα Ζητώ; You Have All I Want)	Andreas Raptis	Marios Psimopoulos	4:03
14.	"Kriono" (Κρυώνω; I'm cold)	Evi Droutsa	Marios Psimopoulos	4:17
15.	"Sta Matia Tora Koita Me" (Στα Μάτια Τώρα Κοίτα Με; Now Look At Me)	Margarita Droutsa	Marios Psimopoulos	3:38
Total length:				1:00:44

== Singles ==
Four songs were officially released as singles at radio stations, some of them with music video, and gained massive airplay:

1. "Pou Na Fantasto" (How Can I Imagine)
2. "Palirroia" (Tide)
3. "Ela" (Come)
4. "Krata Me Xana" (Hold Me Again)

== Credits ==
Credits adapted from liner notes.

=== Personnel ===
- Dimitris Antoniou – guitars (1, 4, 7, 9, 13, 14, 15)
- Solon Apostolakis – orchestration, programming, keyboards (8, 12)
- Yiannis Bithikotsis – bouzouki, cura, baglama (4)
- Takis Damashis – orchestration, programming, keyboards (3)
- Akis Diximos – second vocal (1, 4, 6, 11) / backing vocals (2, 5, 7, 10, 15)
- Manolis Kontaratos – bouzouki (12)
- Katerina Kyriakou – backing vocals (1, 2, 5, 7, 10, 15)
- Yiannis Lionakis – orchestration, programming, keyboards, guitars, bouzouki, baglama (6, 11)
- Andreas Mouzakis – drums (4, 6, 9, 11, 12, 14)
- Elias Pantazopoulos – orchestration, programming, keyboards (2, 5)
- Christos Pertsinidis – guitars (8, 9, 12)
- Manolis Platakis – guitars (10)
- Marios Psimopoulos – orchestration, programming, keyboards (1, 4, 7, 9, 13, 14, 15)
- Nikos Stavropoulos – extra programming (10)
- Nikos Vardis – bass (6, 9, 11, 12)
- Vaggelis Vasiliou – orchestration, programming, keyboards (6, 10, 11) / percussion (10)

=== Production ===
- Takis Argyriou – sound engineer, mix engineer (8, 12)
- Aris Binis – sound engineer (1, 2, 3, 4, 5, 6, 7, 9, 10, 11, 13, 14, 15)
- Yiannis Doulamis – executive producer
- Yiannis Ioannidis (Digital Press Hellas) – mastering
- Vaggelis Kyris – photographer
- Yiannis Marketakis – hair styling, make up
- Lefteris Neromiliotis – mix engineer (1, 2, 3, 4, 5, 6, 7, 9, 10, 11, 13, 14, 15)
- Dimitris Rekouniotis – artwork
- Petros Siakavellas (Digital Press Hellas) – mastering
- Despina Triantafyllidou – photo processing
- Fanis Tsirakis – sound engineer (1, 2, 3, 4, 5, 6, 7, 9, 10, 11, 13, 14, 15)
- Calliope Xyrafi – styling

== Charts ==
Palirroia made its debut at number 7 for 12 weeks on the 'Greece Top 50 Singles' charts.

After months, it was certified gold by IFPI.

Chart	Provider	Peak position	Certification
Greece	IFPI	7	Gold
