= Municipal Council of Vacoas-Phoenix =

Coordinates: 20.300047°S 57.474509°E

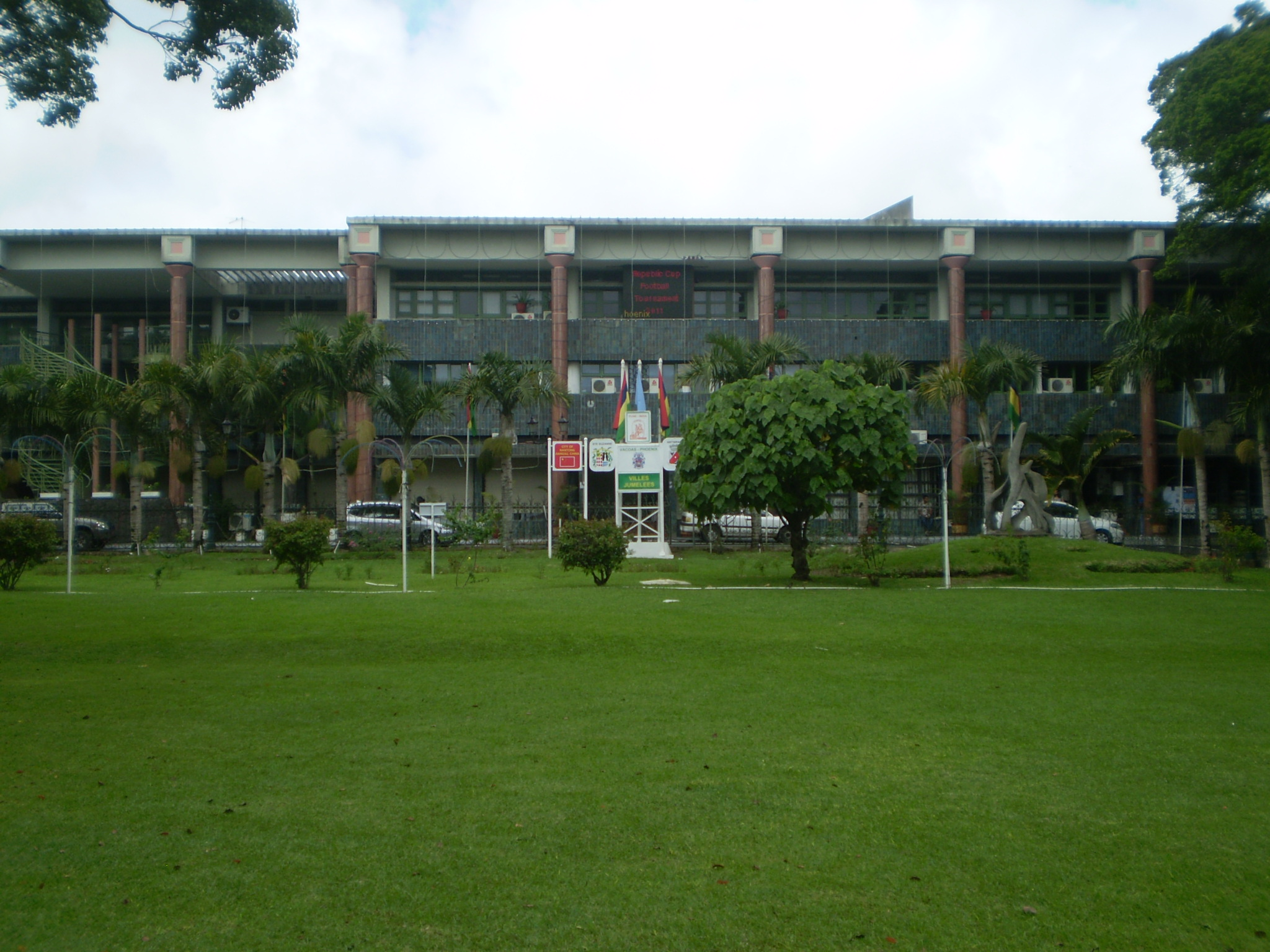
The Municipal Council of Vacoas-Phoenix

The Municipal Council of Vacoas-Phoenix (French: Conseil Municipal de Vacoas-Phoenix) also known as Municipality is the local authority responsible for the administration of the town of Vacoas-Phoenix, Plaines Wilhems District, Mauritius. The Mayor is Mike Manfred Roy Mungur and the Deputy Mayor Devianee Ramchurn.
