= Yassou Maria =

2007 song by Sarbel

- International cover

Single by Sarbel

from the album Sahara: Euro Edition
- Released: 7 March 2007
- Recorded: 2007
- Genre: Laïko; dance-pop
- Length: 2:55
- Label: Sony BMG Greece; Columbia
- Composer(s): Alex Papaconstantinou; Marcus Englöf
- Lyricist(s): Markus Sepehrmanesh
- Producer(s): Alex Papaconstantinou; Marcus Englöf

Sarbel singles chronology
"Se Pira Sovara" (2004)	"Yassou Maria" (2007)

Music video
- "Yassou Maria" on YouTube

Alternate covers
- Greek cover

Eurovision Song Contest 2007 entry
- Country: Greece
- Artist(s): Sarbel Maronitis
- As: Sarbel
- Language: English
- Composer(s): Alex Papaconstantinou; Marcus Englöf
- Lyricist(s): Markus Sepehrmanesh

Finals performance
- Final result: 7th
- Final points: 139

Entry chronology
- ◄ "Everything" (2006)
- "Secret Combination" (2008) ►

Official performance video
- "Yassou Maria (Final) on YouTube

"Yassou Maria" (Greek: Γειά σου Μαρία) is a song recorded by Cypriot-British singer Sarbel, with music composed by Alex Papakonstantinou and Marcus Englöf and lyrics written by Markus Sepehrmanesh. It represented Greece in the Eurovision Song Contest 2007, held in Helsinki, placing seventh.

It was released as a CD single on 7 March 2007 by Sony BMG Greece, going gold in Greece on 7 June 2007.

== Background ==
=== Conception ===
"Yassou Maria" was composed by Alex Papakonstantinou and Marcus Englöf with lyrics by Markus Sepehrmanesh. Papakonstantinou is responsible for big hits by Elena Paparizou.

=== National Selection ===
On 16 February 2007, the Hellenic Broadcasting Corporation (ERT) announced that it had internally selected Sarbel, Tamta, and Christos Dantis as the participants in the national final to select its song and performer for the 52nd edition of the Eurovision Song Contest. The competing songs were revealed on 7 February 2007. On the national final, held on 28 February 2007, the public chose "Yassou Maria" performed by Sarbel as the winner voting 44.45% while the jury also appointed it winner giving 34.92%. All together, it got an average of 39.69% votes, winning the competition and becoming the Greek entry for Eurovision.

At the national final, Sarbel was accompanied on stage by four female dancers, with blue lights and fire in the background. He wore black leather pants and a silver shirt. The choreography was complex, which led with some problems with his microphone.

The CD single was released on 7 March 2007 in Greece and Cyprus by Sony BMG Greece. It includes a duet by Swedish singer Cameron, as well as a remixed song and a Greeklish version of "Yassou Maria". It reached the top position in both countries, being certified gold in Greece.

=== Eurovision ===
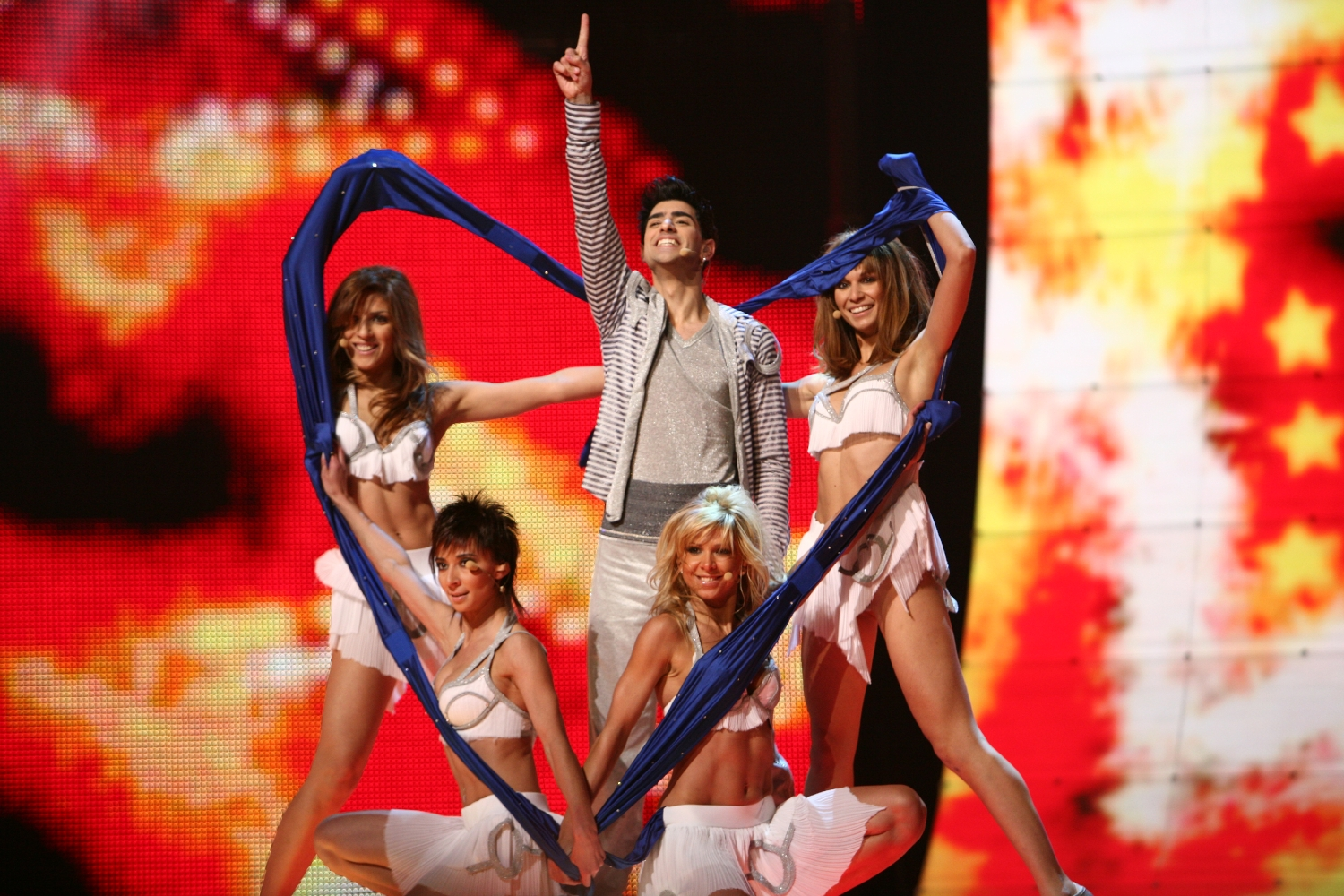
Sarbel performing "Yassou Maria" at Eurovision.

On 12 May 2007, the Eurovision Song Contest grand final was held at the Hartwall Areena in Helsinki hosted by Yleisradio (YLE), and broadcast live throughout the continent. The song was not required to compete in the semi-final since Greece's entry at the previous contest, had reached the top ten –it was ninth–. Sarbel performed "Yassou Maria" tenth on the evening. He went on stage with four girls with short dresses. They used the same dance routine as in the Greek national final, but with minor changes. These included the end part, which used ribbons attached to the girls' skirts during the end bridge, with Sarbel as sort of a puppeteer. Later the ribbons were used to make a heart around Sarbel and the girls at the very end.

At the close of voting, the song received 139 points, finishing in seventh place, 1 point ahead of Armenia and 6 points behind Belarus.

== Track listing ==
1. "Yassou Maria"
2. "Mi Chica" (Greek/English/Spanish mix version) [Duet with Persian-Swedish singer Cameron]
3. "Yassou Maria" (Greeklish version)
4. "Enas Apo Mas" (Anyone of Us – A Stupid Mistake) [Holiday Mix by Dimitris Kontopoulos]

== Charts history ==
=== Weekly charts ===
Chart (2007)	Peak position	Certification
Cyprus (Airplay Chart)	1	
Greece (Singles Chart IFPI)	1	Gold
UK Singles Chart	74	
UK Singles Downloads (OCC)	100	
