= Kati san esena =

Kati san esena Κάτι σαν εσένα

Studio album by Sarbel
- Released: July 2008
- Genre: Modern Laika, Pop
- Language: Greek, English
- Label: Sony BMG Greece/Columbia

Sarbel chronology
Sahara (2006)	Kati san esena Κάτι σαν εσένα (2008)

Singles from Sarbel
- 1. "Eho trelathei"

Kati san esena (in Greek Κάτι σαν εσένα, meaning Something like you) is the 2008 third studio album by Greek singer Sarbel of Cypriot Lebanese origin. It was released by Sony BMG Greece in July 2008.

The album contains 10 songs with 9 in Greek language and one, namely "Desperado" in English. The only single from the album was "Eho threlatei". The songs vary between dance songs and ballads.

The album reached #9 on the Greek Albums Chart.

== Track listing ==
1. Ola dika sou (3:20)
2. Perno tin kardia mou (3:28)
3. To kalokeri afto (3:27)
4. Desperado (02:51)
5. Mono esena (3:42)
6. Kanto (3:34)
7. Ginese erotas (4:00)
8. Eho trelathei (3:30)
9. Poso hronia (kati san esena) (4:12)
10. Ela konta mou (2:41)
