= Sahara (Sarbel album) =

Studio album by Sarbel
- Released: June 14, 2006; March 12, 2007 (Euro Edition)
- Genre: Modern Laika, Pop,
- Language: Greek, English
- Label: Sony BMG Greece/Columbia

Sarbel chronology
Parakseno sinesthima (2004)	Sahara (2006)	Kati san esena

Singles from Sarbel
- 1. "Sahara"; 2. "Takse Mou"; 3. "Enas Apo Mas"; 4. "Yassou Maria" Released: March 7, 2007

Alternative cover
- "Sahara: Euro Edition"

Sahara is an album by Greek artist Sarbel of Cypriot Lebanese origin. It was released on June 14, 2006 by Sony BMG Greece. Following the Eurovision Song Contest 2007, the album was re-released featuring Sarbel's CD single "Yassou Maria": the song that represented Greece.

== Track listing ==
1. "Sahara" (4:14)
2. "Takse mou" (4:05)
3. "E! Kai loipon" (ft Apostoloi, Anax) (3:52)
4. "San kai mena...Pouthena" (ft Vanesa Adamopoulou) (4:13)
5. "O erotas sou me pianei" (3:52)
6. "Mesogeios" (3:46)
7. "Spirto esi - Fotia ego" (ft Keanna Johnson) (4:52)
8. "Enas apo mas (Anyone of Us)" (3:48)
9. "Kali sou nihta" (3:31)
10. "Ego tha ziso" (4:36)
11. "Etsi mou areseis" (4:02)
12. "Dyo matia asteria" (4:02)
13. "Na 'soun thalassa" (ft Natasa Theodoridou) (4:08) (Bonus track)

Sahara: Euro Edition bonus tracks

14. "Yassou Maria" (English Version) (2:59)
15. "Mi chica" (ft Cameron) (3:05)
16. "Yassou Maria" (Greenglish Version) (3:01)
17. "Enas apo mas: Anyone of Us - A Stupid Mistake" (Holiday Mix By D. Kontopoulos) (3:48)
