= Sidi Mansour (album) =

Sidi Mansour سيدي منصور

Studio album by Saber Rebaï
- Released: 2000

Saber Rebaï chronology
Sidi Mansour سيدي منصور (2000)	Khalas tarek (2001)

Sidi Mansour is a 2000 album by Tunisian pan-Arab singer Saber Rebaï that contains his hit song "Sidi Mansour", a massive pan-Arab hit.

== Track listing ==
(Arabic titles in parentheses)

1. "Sidi Mansour" (سيدي منصور)
2. "Awel Alb" (أول قلب)
3. "Kol El Omor" (كل العمر)
4. "Feyn El Nass" (فين الناس)
5. "El Badil" (البديل)
6. "Erhali" (إرحلي)
7. "Eez El Habayeb" (عز الحبايب)
8. "Yeaychek" (يعيشك)
