= Yassin Mohamed =

French footballer (born 1996)

Personal information
- Full name: Yassin Mohamed Dris
- Date of birth: 4 April 1996 (age 30)
- Place of birth: Arras, France
- Height: 1.80 m (5 ft 11 in)
- Positions: Left-back; centre-back

Team information
- Current team: Tournai
- Number: 3

Youth career
- –2012: Lens

Senior career*
Years	Team	Apps	(Gls)
2013	Lens B		
2013–2014	Mouscron II		
2014	Zulte Waregem II		
2014–2015	Córdoba B		
2016–2017	Tournai		
2017–2018	Penya d'Andorra	12	(0)
2018–2019	Vicenza		
2019	Almagro	2	(0)
2019–2020	Raja Beni Mellal		
2020–2022	Lorca	20	(0)
2021–2022	Los Barrios	9	(0)
2022	Villajoyosa	6	(0)
2022–2023	Málaga City		
2023–2024	Olympique Saint-Quentin		
2024	UR Namur	13	(0)
2024–2025	La Louvière Centre	11	(0)
2025	Ordino	1	(0)
2025–	Tournai	0	(0)
- * Club domestic league appearances and goals as of 12:19, 21 January 2026 (UTC)

Yassin Mohamed Dris (born 4 April 1996) is a French professional footballer who plays as a left-back and centre-back for Tournai.

== Career ==
Mohamed started his senior career with Lens. In 2013, he signed for Mouscron in the Belgian First Division B, where he made four league appearances and scored zero goals. After that, he played for Zulte Waregem, Córdoba, R.F.C. Tournai, Penya d'Andorra, Almagro CF, and Lorca, where he moved in 2020.
