= Sarbel =

Greek-Cypriot singer (born 1981)

Sarbel Σαρμπέλ شربل
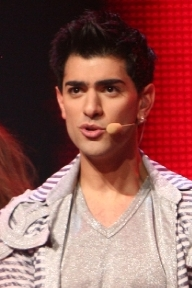
- Sarbel performing in the Eurovision Song Contest

Background information
- Also known as: Sarbel
- Born: Sarbel-Michael Maronitis; 14 May 1981 (age 44); Southgate, London, England
- Origin: Cyprus
- Genres: Pop, modern laika
- Years active: 2004–present
- Labels: Sony Music Greece (2004–2008); 4Music (2009–2011) HoneyBel Music (2011 – present)
- Website: www.sarbel.com

Sarbel-Michael Maronitis (Greek: Σαρμπέλ Μιχαήλ Μαρωνίτης; Arabic: شربل ميهل مارونيت; born 14 May 1981) known mononimously as Sarbel (Greek: Σαρμπέλ; Arabic: شربل; born 14 May 1981), is a British Greek Cypriot singer. His singles include "Se Pira Sovara" [ Greek: 'I've just taken you seriously'], and albums Parakseno sinesthima ['Strange feeling'], Sahara and Kati san esena ['Something reminiscent of you']. Ηe represented Greece in the Eurovision Song Contest 2007 with "Yassou Maria".

== Biography ==
=== Early life ===
Sarbel was born and raised in Southgate, London, England, to a Greek Cypriot father, Elias, himself a singer and bouzouki player, and a Lebanese Maronite mother, a lawyer. Sarbel's family made frequent summer trips to Greece and Cyprus. He received a Jesuit education at St Ignatius' College in Enfield. Sarbel studied music (voice), drama, art, and performing arts. From the age of 5 to 16 he performed at the English National Opera and the Royal Opera House Covent Garden and has recorded Tosca in English for Chandos Recordings as the shepherd boy.

He was named after the Maronite Saint Charbel. and his name is correctly pronounced "Sharbel", but since standard Greek lacks a "sh" sound, Greeks pronounce the name "Sarbel" in accordance with the Greek transliteration ("Σαρμπέλ").

Sarbel sang yearly at St Ignatius and other talent shows.

== Music career ==
At the age of 18, Sarbel went to Crete, where he sang at the Heraklion Palladium. At the age of 21, still living on the Greek island of Crete, he was signed on by Sony BMG (Greece) on a six-year recording contract.

=== 2004–2005: Parakseno sinesthima (Παράξενο Συναίσθημα) ===
In 2004 he recorded the Arabic hit "Se Pira Sovara" featuring Greek singer Irini Merkouri. The song is based on an Arabic song called "Sidi Mansour" by Saber Rebaï. On the same CD (a CD single) he released a second duet with Merkouri called "Agapi Mou Esi" ['My love']. In 2005, he released his first solo album, entitled Parakseno sinesthima (in Greek Παράξενο συναίσθημα). This album went Gold and was re-released with the Wella-sponsored song "Thelo na Petaxo" ['I wanna fly'] and a bonus track of "Boro Boro", which he made famous during his MAD Award Ceremony appearance. The songs "Se Pira Sovara", "Sokolata" ['Chocolate'], and "Thelo Na Petakso" are some of his notable songs.

=== 2006: Sahara ===
In July 2006, he released his second album, Sahara. That same year he recorded a duet with Greek singer Natassa Theodoridou called Na' Soun Thalassa ['Wish you were sea] which was also included as a bonus song on the album. The album includes "Taxe Mou" ['Promise me'], "Sahara" and "Enas Apo Mas" ['One of us'].

=== 2007: Eurovision and Sahara: Euro Edition ===
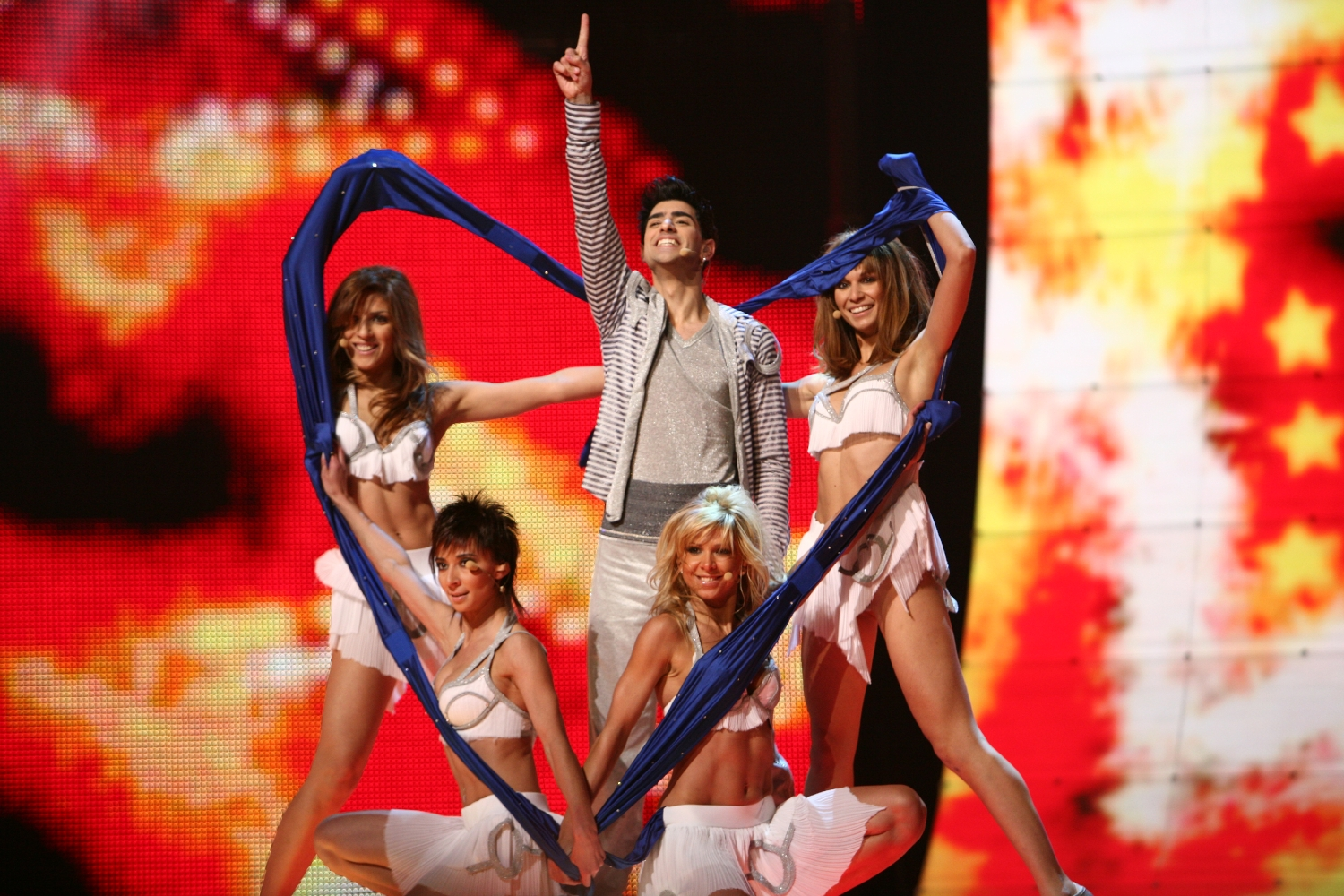
Sarbel at the Eurovision Song Contest 2007

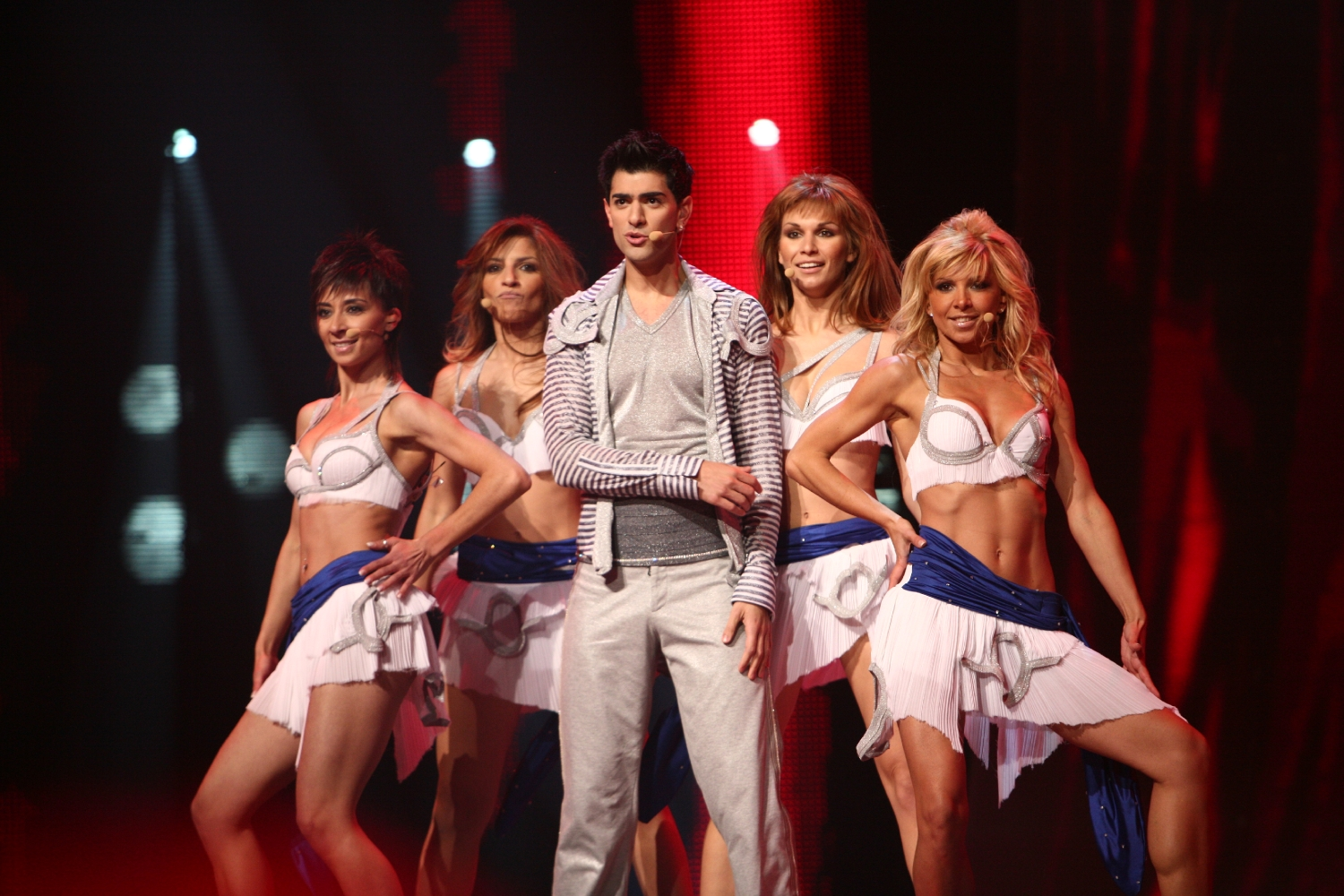
Sarbel at the Eurovision Song Contest 2007

Seeing his growing popularity, Greek television ERT asked Sarbel to compete for a ticket to represent Greece in the Eurovision Song Contest in Helsinki, Finland. Sarbel had to compete against established singer Christos Dantis and fellow newcomer singer Tamta. Sarbel enlisted the help of Greek-Swedish composers Alex Papacostantinou, Marcus Englof, and Mack to write his song, who are responsible for many of Greek singer Elena Paparizou's hits. They wrote the song "Yassou Maria", which is performed in English with only the word 'yassou' (and the name 'Maria') being Greek. There is also a version released in a mix of Greek and English.

On 28 February 2007, Sarbel performed the song live against the two singers for the ticket. Although the performance had some sound problems, he went on to receive 39.69% of the combined televotes and jury votes, winning the contest.

In an interview in March 2007, Sarbel made it clear that he doesn't want an international career by saying "I don't care either being famous abroad or starting an international career. I only care for Greece. I grew up abroad but choose to live in Greece. I can't tell you whether Eurovision helps my career or not, because I don't know. It's very dangerous. However, it is an experience I want to live. I want to have fun in the Contest and do my best.". Following the win, Sarbel toured Europe to promote his song. He also filmed the video clip for the song and changed the scene performance around a bit. The song eventually placed 7th at the Eurovision Song Contest 2007.

On 12 March 2007, Sahara was re-released as Sahara: Euro Edition and feature the "Yassou Maria" CD single as a bonus. The CD single for "Yassou Maria" was released on 7 March 2007. The CD single includes "Yassou Maria", "Yassou Maria (Greeklish version)", "Enas Apo Mas (Special Holiday Mix)" and a duet with Persian singer Cameron Cartio called "Mi Chica" which was recorded in a mixture of Greek, English, Spanish and Persian and is Latin in style with Greek pop elements.

=== 2008–2012: Kati san esena ===
Sarbel started singing at Votanikos club in Athens, at 2008, along with Natassa Theodoridou and Nikos Kourkoulis.

The new single "Eho Trelathei" [Greek for 'I have been driven crazy'] was introduced at the Greek National Final 2008 on ERT. It is a blend of oriental elements with the main chorus being rock. This was followed by the release of the album Kati san esena.

To promote his new album amongst his fellow Londoners, he performed at the two-day Cyprus Wine Festival of London in 2008. Sarbel felt that "My performance at the Cyprus Wine Festival (in London) is my chance to give something back to my community." And both performances brought tears to his friend's and family's eyes that still live in London.

In July 2009, Sarbel released a two track CD-single titled "Mou Pai" under his new signing with E.DI.EL record label. The second track on the CD called "So Perfect" is a song written by Sarbel.

Sarbel toured internationally performing alongside Giorgos Mazonakis in Sydney, Melbourne and Adelaide in Australia and other various solo appearances and Egypt.

His new CD album was released in the Spring of 2011. The first single from this CD Album was the pre-release from the album and was called "Kafto Kalokairi" with the initial performance at the Pavilion on the 18 March 2011. The release was accompanied by a music video for the single filmed on the cruise ship Cristall. The following single was "Pou Na Girnas" released in November 2011 and was penned by Greek composer Alexis Serkos. The video clip was released in conjunction with single to launch Sarbel's winter tour of Dubai and the Persian Gulf region.

=== 2012–present ===
After a tour of Dubai, and other Arab countries, Sarbel went back to the studio and recorded a new single "Proti Ptisi" [Greek for 'First Flight'] which was released in early 2013 and followed up with a tour in Crete, Athens, Beirut and Cyprus. He was also involved in his new record company Honeybel Music which produces lounge music predominantly bought and used in Dubai. Sarbel was a guest as well at the London Eurovision Party which took place in the Shadow Lounge in Soho. The event was organised to promote the representatives for this year's Eurovision Song Contest and Sarbel as an earlier contestant was invited to perform by public demand.

== Discography ==
=== Studio albums ===
All the albums listed underneath were released and charted in Greece and Cyprus.

Year	Title	Title in Greek	Certification
2004	Parakseno sinesthima	Παράξενο συναίσθημα	Gold
2005	Parakseno sinesthima Special Edition	Παράξενο συναίσθημα (Special Edition)	Platinum
2006	Sahara	Σαχάρα	–
2007	Sahara (Euro Edition)	Σαχάρα (Euro Edition)	Gold
2008	Kati san esena	Κάτι σαν εσένα	–

=== CD singles ===
Year	Title	Notes
2004	"Se Pira Sovara" (in Greek Σε πήρα σοβαρά)	Gold
2007	"Yassou Maria" (in Greek Γεια σου, Μαρία)	Platinum

==== Full singles discography ====
- 2004: "Se Pira Sovara"
- 2005: "Sokolata"
- 2005: "Thelo na petaxo"
- 2006: "Sahara"
- 2006: "Takse mou"
- 2006: "Enas apo mas"
- 2007: "Yassou Maria"
- 2008: "Eho trelathei"
- 2009: "Mou pai" ['It suits me']
- 2011: "Kafto Kalokairi" ['Hot summer']
- 2011: "Pou Na Girnas" ['Why come back?']
- 2013: "Proti Ptisi"

==== Music videos ====
- 2004: "Se pira sovara"
- 2005: "Sokolata"
- 2005: "Thelo na petaxo"
- 2005: "Boro Boro/Chiculata" (Mad Music Awards) [feat. Chrispa]
- 2006: "Thriller"/"Pano stin trella mou" (Mad Music Awards) [feat. Vanesa Adamopoulou]
- 2006: "Taxe mou"
- 2006: "Enas apo mas"
- 2007: "Yassou Maria" (ERT Promo Video)
- 2007: "Yassou Maria" (Official Video Clip)
- 2008: "Eho trelathei"
- 2009: "Mou paei"
- 2011: "Monaxa esy"
- 2011: "Kafto Kalokairi"
- 2011: "Pou Na Girnas"
- 2013: "Proti Ptisi"

Preceded by Anna Vissi with Everything	Greece in the Eurovision Song Contest; 2007	Succeeded by Kalomira with Secret Combination
