= Nelson Nhamussua =

Mozambican basketball player

No. 6 – A Politécnica
- Position: Power forward
- League: Mozambican

Personal information
- Born: January 31, 2001 (age 25) Maputo

Career information
- Playing career: 2014–present

Career history
- 2014–present: Apolitécnica (Mozambique)

Nelson Custódia Nhamussua (Maputo, January 31, 2001), a.k.a. Nelsinho is a Mozambican professional basketball player who currently plays for A Politécnica of the Mozambican Division I Basketball League.
