= Ahmed Rebai =

Tunisian singer

Ahmed Rebai أحمد الرباعي
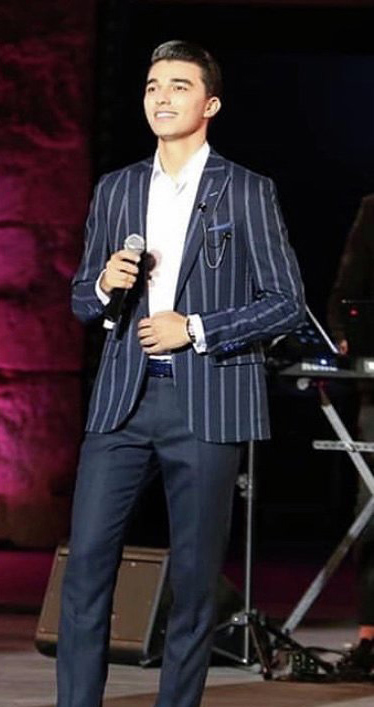
- Ahmed Rebai, Concert of the International Festival of Carthage, July 2019

Background information
- Born: Ahmed Ben Wajdi Rebai; October 27, 1997 (age 29); Tunis, Tunisia
- Genre: Arabic music
- Occupation: Singer
- Instrument: Violin
- Years active: 2016–present
- Label: Rotana
- Website: www.ahmedrebai.com

Ahmed Ben Wajdi Rebai (Arabic: أحمد بن وجدي الرباعي; born October 27, 1997) is a Tunisian singer.

Coming from a family of musicians from Sfax, he is the nephew of singer Saber Rebaï.

== Biography ==
=== Childhood and training ===
Ahmed Rebai, born in 1997 in Tunis into a family of musicians, with his father Wajdi, a professional musician, and his uncle Saber, a renowned singer. His father realizes that his son has talent and that he must be supported in his first steps and especially help him develop his career. Very early on, he encouraged him to learn music and play the violin in specialized schools, such as the National Conservatory of Music in Tunis. Ahmed Rebai started singing at the age of eleven.

After obtaining his baccalaureate, he followed university studies at the Higher Institute of Music of Tunis, where he obtained a fundamental license in music and musicology in 2019. In 2020, it follows studies master.

=== Career ===
- His sources of inspiration are his uncle Saber Rebaï, but also Abdel Halim Hafez, Ali Riahi and Dhikra Mohamed.
- In December 2016, at the age of 19, he released his first song, Abati ( أبتي or My father ), written by Bachir Lakkani and composed by Najib Meslmani.
- In September 2018 released his single Nhebbek Men Ghir Tfalsif .
- In June 2019, he made a television appearance in the show Fekrat Sami Fehri and announced the official release of his first album entitled Waad, whose first song combines the lyricist Hossam Said, the composer Osman Gad and the arranger. Ahmed Magdy; the music video is directed by director Seif El Saher .
- In June 2020, he participated in the creation of a promotional artistic project for Banque Zitouna, with a song entitled Ahna Tejmaana Al Kiyam and interpreted by Lotfi Bouchnak and Insaf Ben Ghalia.

=== Performance ===
- September 2018 : resumption of the title Gabbar by Abdel Halim Hafez during the Essmaani 1 event organized by the Association for Research on Cancer.
- October 2018 : tribute to Hassan Dahmani with the accompaniment of the Tunisian National Orchestra.
- January 2019 : La Mélodie de la Révolution concert : translating the will of the people into music! given by the Tunisian National Orchestra with singer Leïla Hjaiej on the occasion of the festival of the Tunisian revolution organized at the Cité de la Culture.
- July 2019 : surprise guest of singer Latifa Arfaoui with whom he performs Ahimou Bi Tounes El Khadhra on the stage of the International Festival of Carthage.
- August 2019 : duet with Eya Daghnouj during the inaugural evening of the first edition of the Nuits du Théâtre de l'Opéra in Hammamet, accompanied by the Tunisian National Orchestra conducted by Mohamed Lassoued.
- July 2020 : show given at the 63rd anniversary of the proclamation of the Republic and interpété by the Tunisian Symphony Orchestra, under the direction of Mohamed Bouslama, the choir of the Opera of Tunis, the Tunisian National Orchestra and singer Abir Derbel.

== Discography ==
- Abati ( 2016 ): single
- Nhebbek Men Ghir Tfalsif ( 2018 ): single
- Waad ( 2019 ): album
  - Waad
  - Hekayti Ana
  - The Mantoub
- Tamenouni Einik ( 2020 ): single
- Nedem ( 2021 ): single
- Yalli Nsiti ( 2021 ): single

== Prizes and distinctions ==
- March 2018 : trophy of honor awarded by Lions Clubs in honor of its support for its social works.
- February 2019 : certificate of honor for collaboration and mutual aid with the Amicalement Vôtre collective.
- Prize for the best young artist in Tunisia for the year 2019 awarded by the Tunisian Union of Young Workers.
- April 2021 : first prize in the 20 ^{th} edition of the Festival of Song Tunisian held at the Opera House for her project NEDEM (lyrics and composition and arrangement of Slim Abdullah Zaidi Marwen).
