= Irini Merkouri =

Irini Merkouri Ειρήνη Μερκούρη
- Born: Chrysovalanto Chalilopoulou; 26 May 1981 (age 45); Athens, Greece
- Genres: Laïko; pop; dance
- Years active: 2001–present
- Labels: Sony BMG Greece; 4Music

Chrysovalanto Chalilopoulou (Greek: Χρυσοβαλάντω Χαλιλοπούλου; born 26 May 1981), known professionally as Irini Merkouri (Greek: Ειρήνη Μερκούρη, pronounced [iˈrini merˈkuri]), is a Greek pop and laïko singer.

== Career ==
=== Early life ===
Merkouri was born and raised in Ilion, Athens to Romani parents. She began showing interest in being a singer at a very young age and at the age of seven she would mimic all the singers she would see on television.

=== 2001–2003: Debut album and Meine Mazi Mou Apopse ===
Irini Merkouri signed a contract with Sony Music Greece and recorded her first solo album Na Fysai I Anixi in November 2001. As part of this album she sang a duet with Antonis Remos titled "Dio Mas" and a Greek version of the French song "Si Tu Ouvres Tes Bras" titled "Iparhi Kai Theos". The album included a total of twelve songs including the hits "Syntelia" and "Foties Anapste".

In June 2003, Merkouri released her second studio album, titled Mine Mazi Mou Apopse (Stay With Me Tonight). It consisted of 12 songs and included a remix of "Syntelia" which topped the airplay charts for 3 consecutive months. The album also included the hits "Ematha Na Zo Horis Esena" and "Meine Mazi Mou Apopse".

=== 2004: Sarbel and Palirroia ===
In 2004, Merkouri was featured in Sarbel's "Se Pira Sovara". In the same CD Single, Merkouri and Sarbel also released a second duet called "Agapi Mou Esi".

In June 2004, Merkouri released her third studio album, titled Palirroia, which contained 15 new songs. The first single to hit the airwaves was "Ela", a song with a mix of both modern laika and ragga elements. The second single, "Pou Na Fantasto" became the first video clip of the album and was a big hit at clubs throughout Greece. The third single, "Krata Me Ksana", was written by Takis Damashis of C:Real and with his help Merkouri won the Arion Award for "Best Pop Singer".

=== 2005–2009: Aneta, Argises, & "Nai" ===
On July 7, 2005, Merkouri released her fourth studio album, titled Aneta (Comfortably). It featured hits from her previous albums and also contained 7 new songs."

The year 2006 brought Merkouri's fifth studio album, titled Argises (You Were Late). It contained 13 new songs including the hits "Pame Gi'Alla" and "Miso Lepto" which became a video clip. Christos Pazis performs a duet with Merkouri called "Argises".

Merkouri finished off 2007 with the release of a CD single titled "Nai" (Yes). It contained two songs "Nai" and "Kane Ena Tsigaro". "Nai" was made into a video clip, and the single reached the second place on the IFPI Singles Chart for Greece.

Shortly after, Merkouri recorded a new album in the studio with Sony BMG Greece. After internal disagreements with Sony BMG, Merkouri reportedly severed ties with label in 2009, and it is unknown what will happen with the unreleased material. Merkori signed with newly established label E.DI.EL. in 2009, which later re-branded to 4Music. In mid-2009, Merkouri digitally released the song "Parakseno Agori".

== Discography ==
=== Albums ===
- 2002: Na Fysai I Anixi
- 2003: Mine Mazi Mou Apopse
- 2004: Palirroia
- 2005: Aneta
- 2006: Argises

=== CD singles ===
- 2007: "Nai"
