= Brännkyrka =

Parish in South Stockholm, Sweden

Coordinates: 59.28219°N 18.02314°E

Brännkyrka is a parish in South Stockholm, Sweden. The population as of 2004 is 36,572.

Brännkyrka, at that time much larger in area, was amalgamated into the city of Stockholm in 1913. This area now constitutes the southern main part of Stockholm Municipality called Söderort. The original parish has since then been divided into many new parishes and the present Brännkyrka parish is situated around Brännkyrka church in the centre of the area.

Brännkyrka was the site of a Swedish victory over Danish forces in 1518.

Parts of the church were built in the 12th century. There are notes that there has been four serious fires in the church. It is assumed that the name Brännkyrka ("burnt church") was given after a fire around 1400, since it was named "Vantör" before that time.

The Brännkyrka basketball team is very popular amongst locals, and their matches at the Brännkyrka gymnasium are always a fun a happy gathering of the community.
