= Vacoas-Phoenix =

Vacoas-Phoenix Villes Jumelles
- Town
- Vacoas-Phoenix
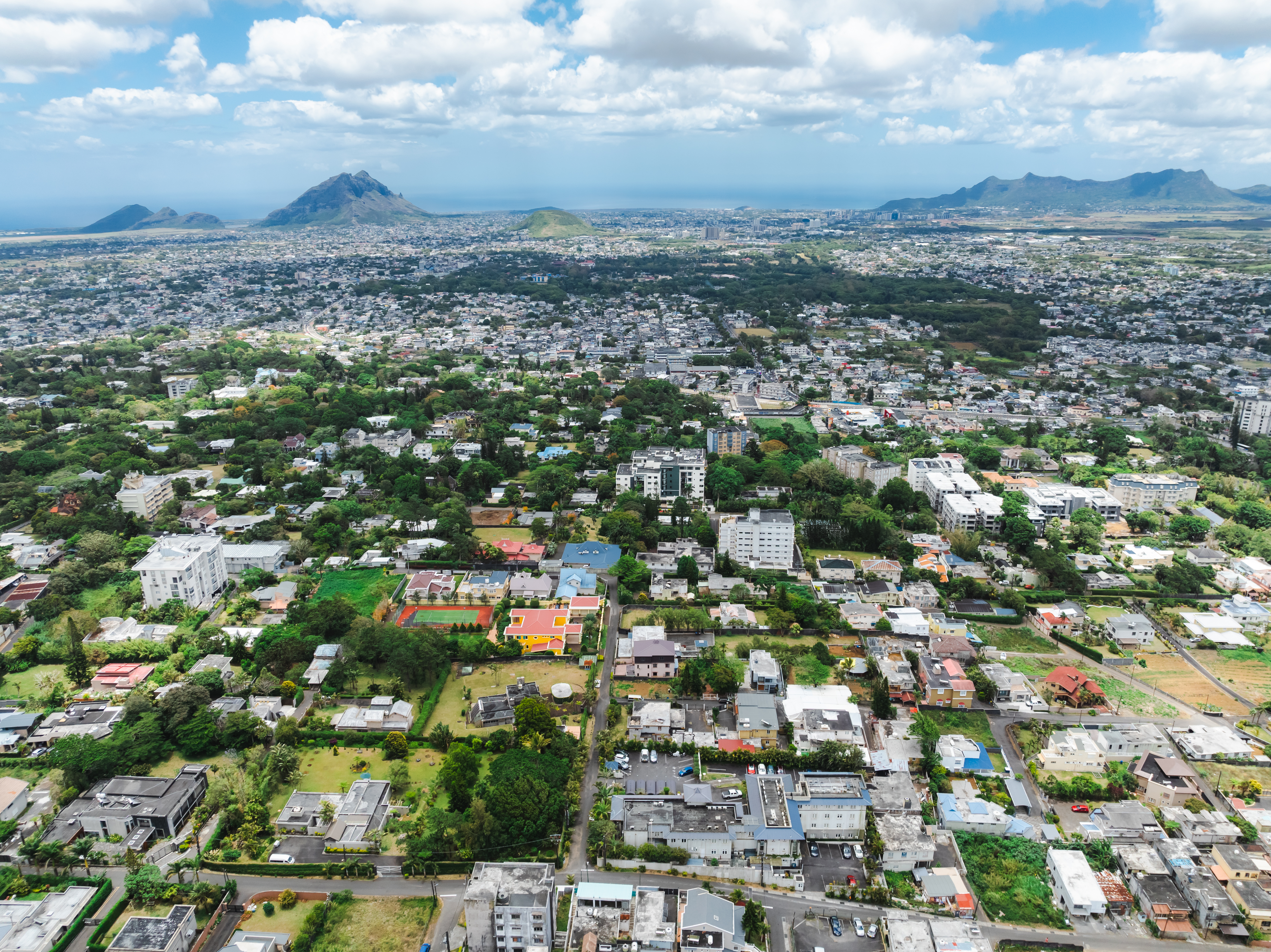
- Motto: "Copia et Concordia"
- Municipal Council location
- Coordinates: 20°18′0.17″S 57°28′28.23″E
- Country: Mauritius
- District: Plaines Wilhems

Government
  - Type: Municipality
  - Mayor: Mr. Sunjeevsingh Dindyal
  - Deputy Mayor: Mr. Sadaseven Sooben

Area
  - Total: 110.2 km^{2} (42.5 sq mi)

Population (2019)
  - Total: 115,289
  - Rank: 2nd in Mauritius
  - Density: 1,046/km^{2} (2,710/sq mi)
- Demonym: Vacoassian / Phoenician
- Time zone: UTC+4 (MUT)
- Climate: Af
- Website: www.vacoasphoenix.org

Vacoas-Phoenix (Mauritian Creole pronunciation: [vakwa feniks]) also known as French: Villes Jumelles (Twin Cities), is a town in Mauritius, located in the Plaines Wilhems District, the eastern part also lies in the Moka District. The town is administered by the Municipal Council of Vacoas-Phoenix. The town lies between Quatre Bornes and Curepipe.

== History ==
The towns of Vacoas and Phoenix fused in 1963. Vacoas-Phoenix fully became a municipality in 1968.

== Politics ==
For the general elections, the town is classified as the No 15 constituency known as La Caverne and Phoenix and the No 16 Vacoas and Floreal constituency.

== Sports ==
The football team of the town is the AS de Vacoas-Phoenix, they play in the Mauritian League, the top football division of the island nation.

The town hosted the official 2017 FIBA Under-16 African Championship.

== Education ==
JSS Academy of Technical Education, Mauritius is a college located at Avenue Droopnath Ramphul, Bonne Terre, Vacoas, Mauritius.

== Sub-locality ==
The town of Vacoas-Phoenix is divided into different suburbs.

- Bonne-Terre
- Camp Fouquereaux
- Castel
- Cinq Arpents
- Clairfonds
- Glen Park
- Henrietta
- Hermitage
- Highlands
- Hollyrood
- La Caverne
- La Marie
- Modern
- Mesnil
- Phoenix
- Quinze Cantons
- Réunion
- Sadally
- Solférino
- St-Paul
- Visitation
- Vacoas

== Government ==
Mauritius Qualifications Authority is headquartered in this town.

== Twin towns – sister cities ==
Vacoas-Phoenix is twinned with:

- Antsirabe, Madagascar
- Nantong, China
- Pune, India
- Sainte-Suzanne, Réunion, France

== Geography ==
=== Climate ===
Climate data for Vacoas (1991-2020)
Month	Jan	Feb	Mar	Apr	May	Jun	Jul	Aug	Sep	Oct	Nov	Dec	Year
Record high °C (°F)	31.6 (88.9)	31.6 (88.9)	31.5 (88.7)	30.0 (86.0)	29.6 (85.3)	27.0 (80.6)	26.5 (79.7)	25.7 (78.3)	27.5 (81.5)	28.5 (83.3)	30.0 (86.0)	31.4 (88.5)	31.6 (88.9)
Mean daily maximum °C (°F)	28.1 (82.6)	28.0 (82.4)	27.7 (81.9)	26.7 (80.1)	25.1 (77.2)	23.1 (73.6)	22.1 (71.8)	22.2 (72.0)	23.1 (73.6)	24.5 (76.1)	26.2 (79.2)	27.5 (81.5)	25.3 (77.5)
Daily mean °C (°F)	24.3 (75.7)	24.4 (75.9)	24.0 (75.2)	23.1 (73.6)	21.3 (70.3)	19.6 (67.3)	18.7 (65.7)	18.7 (65.7)	19.2 (66.6)	20.4 (68.7)	21.9 (71.4)	23.4 (74.1)	21.6 (70.9)
Mean daily minimum °C (°F)	21.3 (70.3)	21.5 (70.7)	21.2 (70.2)	20.4 (68.7)	18.3 (64.9)	16.8 (62.2)	16.0 (60.8)	15.9 (60.6)	16.2 (61.2)	17.2 (63.0)	18.5 (65.3)	20.1 (68.2)	18.6 (65.5)
Record low °C (°F)	14.6 (58.3)	11.6 (52.9)	14.3 (57.7)	12.5 (54.5)	11.8 (53.2)	8.2 (46.8)	7.7 (45.9)	8.0 (46.4)	9.5 (49.1)	10.4 (50.7)	9.4 (48.9)	14.0 (57.2)	7.7 (45.9)
Average precipitation mm (inches)	313.6 (12.35)	338.2 (13.31)	291.0 (11.46)	175.8 (6.92)	123.1 (4.85)	102.3 (4.03)	118.1 (4.65)	97.0 (3.82)	77.4 (3.05)	61.0 (2.40)	80.6 (3.17)	165.0 (6.50)	1,943.2 (76.50)
Average precipitation days (≥ 1 mm)	16.6	17.9	17.5	15.8	13.4	15.2	18.0	16.3	12.8	10.5	8.8	12.2	174.9
Average relative humidity (%)	83	85	84	85	83	82	83	82	83	83	83	82	83
Mean monthly sunshine hours	215.9	192.6	215.4	215.4	226.1	216.9	217.7	220.9	220.6	246.1	233.5	233.1	2,654.2
Percentage possible sunshine	56	55	60	60	67	67	67	63	61	61	61	55	61
Source 1: NOAA
Source 2: Mauritius Meteorological Services (extremes, humidity and percent sun 1971-2000)

== See also ==
- List of places in Mauritius
- Phoenix Beverages, is the largest brewery of the island and is located in Phoenix
