= Saber Rebai =

Tunisian actor and singer (born 1967)

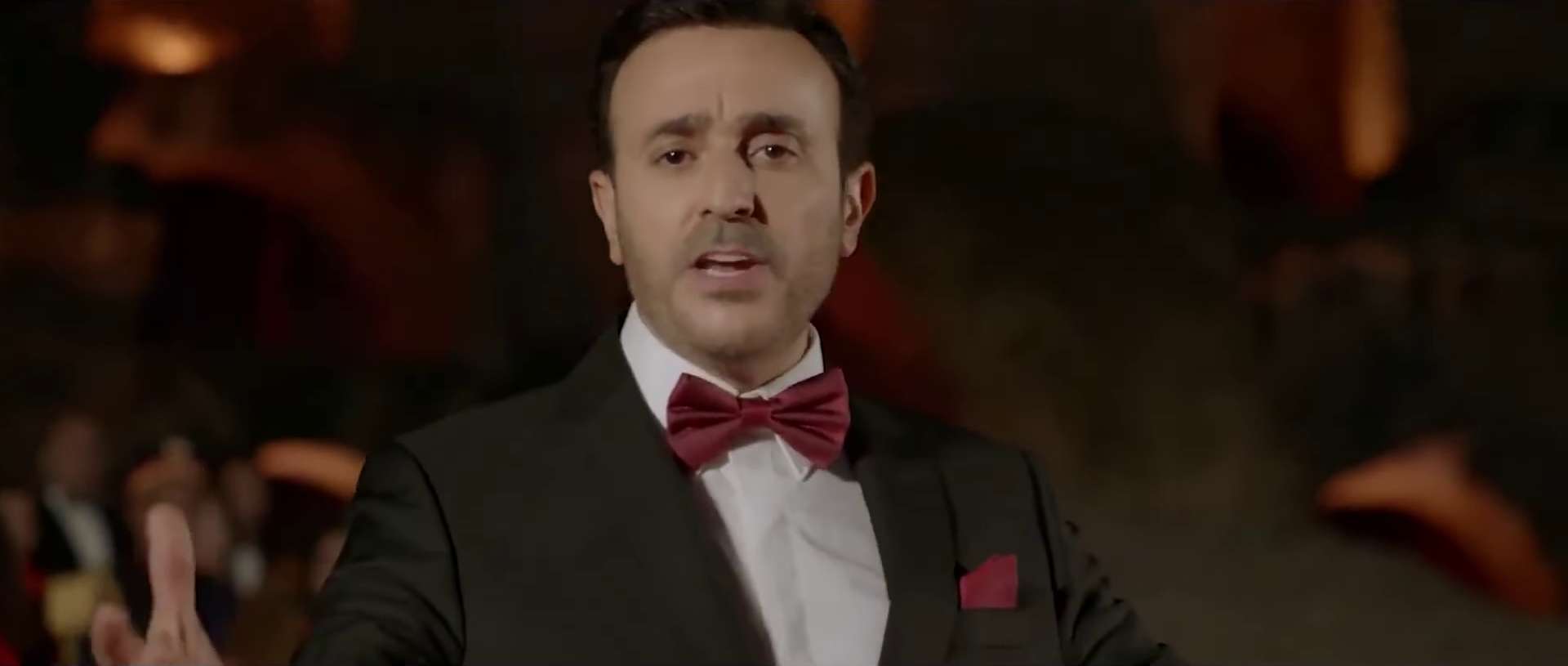

Background information
- Born: Saber ibn Al-Hadi El-Rebai صابر ابن الهادي الرباعي; 13 March 1967 (age 59); Sfax, Tunisia
- Genres: Classical Arabic, Arabic pop
- Occupations: Singer, songwriter, musician, actor
- Instruments: Vocals, oud, violin
- Years active: 1988–present
- Label: Rotana

Saber ibn Al-Hadi El-Rebai (Arabic: صابر ابن الهادي الرباعي, romanized: Ṣābir ibn al-Hādī ar-Rubaʿī; born 13 March 1967) is a Tunisian singer, actor, and composer. He is known for his song "Sidi Mansour". Some albums carry the variant transliteration Saber el Rebaii. He is one of the most well-known artists in the Arab world.

== Early life ==
Rebai was born in Tunisia. In 2006, while performing in Aden, he spoke about his extreme pride of his Yemeni heritage.

== Career ==
Besides being an accomplished violinist, he started singing professionally at 17 years old, impressing leading musicians at the time, including Mohammed Abdel Wahab, Abd El Kader El Asaly, Wadih El Safi, Abdel Halim Hafez, and Karem Mahmoud. Saber composed some of his songs' melodies, including the song Kalima. He worked with Hilmi Baker, Salah El Charnoubi and Dr. Abd El Rab Idriss.

== International concerts ==
Saber Rebai went on tour across Europe, USA, Australia and also performed in Palestine and South Korea. He gave shows in the Olympia in Paris, Carthage and Cairo.

== Awards ==
Saber Rebai won many awards for his participation in international festivals among which:

- Cartage Festivals for many years
- Arab Music Festival
- Egyptian Opera House Award
- Cairo International Festivals
- Francophone Festivals
- The Gold Microphone in Cairo Festivals

== Distinctions ==
Commander of the Tunisian Order of Merit (2006)

== Discography ==
Albums

- Hayyarouni – حيّروني
- Ya lilla – يا للا
- Yalli bjamalak – ياللي بجمالك
- 2000: Sidi Mansour- سيدي منصور
- 2001: Khalas tarek – خلص تارك
- 2003: Share' elgharam – شارع الغرام
- 2004: Atahadda al aalam – أتحدّى العالم
- 2006: Ajmal nesaa aldounia – أجمل نساء الدنيا
- 2007: El ghorba – الغربة
- 2009: Waheshni giddan – واحشني جدا

Singles

- 2000: "Sidi Mansour" – سيدي منصور

== Personal life ==
He is the father of three children: two (Eslam and Safa) from his first marriage to a banker, and one (Jude Hedi) from his second marriage to a flight attendant, which took place in March 2013. He is also the uncle of the singer Ahmed Rebai.
