= 2009 FIBA Africa Under-16 Championship =

2009 FIBA U16 AfroBasket
1st FIBA Under-16 African Basketball Championship

Tournament details
- Host country: Mozambique
- Dates: September 19–26
- Teams: 9
- Venue: 1 (in 1 host city)

Final positions
- Champions: Egypt (1st title)

Tournament statistics
- MVP: (Egypt) Ahmed Mostafa
- Top scorer: (Egypt) Mostafa 21.5
- Top rebounds: (Egypt) Hamdy 8
- Top assists: (Egypt) Mostafa 1.8
- PPG (Team): Mali (80.8)
- RPG (Team): Mali (31.8)
- APG (Team): Mali (11.8)

Official website
- 2009 FIBA Africa Championship U-16

The 2009 FIBA Africa Under-16 Championship for Men (alternatively the Afrobasket U16) was the 1st U-16 FIBA Africa championship, played under the auspices of the Fédération Internationale de Basketball, the basketball sport governing body and qualified for the 2010 World Cup. The tournament was held from September 19–26 in Maputo, Mozambique, contested by 9 national teams and won by Egypt.

The tournament qualified the winner for the 2010 U17 World Championship.

== Format ==
- The 9 teams were divided into two groups (Groups A+B) for the preliminary round.
- Round robin for the preliminary round; the top four teams advanced to the quarterfinals.
- From there on a knockout system was used until the final.

== Draw ==
| Group A | Group B |
|---|---|
| Egypt; Mali; Mozambique; South Africa | Algeria; Angola; Central African Rep. Guinea; Nigeria |

== Preliminary round ==
Times given below are in UTC+2.

=== Group A ===
| Team | Pld | W | L | PF | PA | PD | Pts |
|---|---|---|---|---|---|---|---|
| Mali | 3 | 3 | 0 | 237 | 142 | +95 | 6 |
| Egypt | 3 | 2 | 1 | 241 | 164 | +77 | 5 |
| Mozambique | 3 | 1 | 2 | 149 | 203 | -59 | 4 |
| South Africa | 3 | 0 | 3 | 131 | 249 | -118 | 3 |

18 September 2009
18:00

Report

| Egypt | 59–71 | Mali |
Scoring by quarter: 12-28, 18-12, 12-24, 17-7
| Pts: Mostafa 22; Rebs: Moftan 5 Asts: Mostafa 2 | | Pts: Traoré 18; Rebs: Keita 4 Asts: Sangaré 5 |

Pavilhão do Maxaquene, Maputo

18 September 2009
20:00

Report

| Mozambique | 54–50 | South Africa |
Scoring by quarter: 9-13, 13-8, 17-11, 15-18
| Pts: Chirindza 19; Rebs: Cotela 5 Asts: Mondlane 2 | | Pts: Festile 17; Rebs: Mahlinza 6 Asts: Sithole 1 |

Pavilhão do Maxaquene, Maputo

19 September 2009
14:00

Report

| South Africa | 44–111 | Egypt |
Scoring by quarter: 12-34, 13-21, 14-29, 5-27
| Pts: Paton 13; Rebs: Mahlinza 6 Asts: Festile 2 | | Pts: Hamdy 19; Rebs: Samir 10; Asts: Shousha 5 |

Pavilhão do Maxaquene, Maputo

19 September 2009
20:00

Report

| Mali | 82–46 | Mozambique |
Scoring by quarter: 17-11, 18-7, 25-19, 22-9
| Pts: Moungoro 22; Rebs: Konaté 9 Asts: Sangaré 5 | | Pts: Manusse 16; Rebs: Biasse 4 Asts: Mondlane 1 |

Pavilhão do Maxaquene, Maputo

20 September 2009
20:00

Report

| Mozambique | 49–71 | Egypt |
Scoring by quarter: 7-19, 13-20, 14-22, 15-13
| Pts: Chirindza 17; Rebs: Inhamussua 5 Asts: Chirindza 1 | | Pts: Mostafa 22; Rebs: Hamdy 10; Asts: Gindy 2 |

Pavilhão do Maxaquene, Maputo

20 September 2009
16:00

Report

| Mali | 84–37 | South Africa |
Scoring by quarter: 21-5, 21-11, 22-8, 20-13
| Pts: Moungoro 25; Rebs: D.Konaté 9 Asts: Sangaré 4 | | Pts: Paton 10; Rebs: Touré 6 Asts: Festile 2 |

Pavilhão do Maxaquene, Maputo

=== Group B ===
Guinea was disqualified due to age fraud

| Team | Pld | W | L | PF | PA | PD | Pts |
|---|---|---|---|---|---|---|---|
| Nigeria | 4 | 4 | 0 | 284 | 248 | +36 | 8 |
| Algeria | 4 | 3 | 1 | 209 | 155 | +54 | 6 |
| Angola | 4 | 2 | 2 | 235 | 228 | +7 | 5 |
| Central African Republic | 4 | 1 | 3 | 195 | 354 | -159 | 4 |
| Guinea | 4 | 0 | 4 | 205 | 143 | +62 | 0 |

18 September 2009
14:00

Report

| C.A.R. | 34–85 | Algeria |
Scoring by quarter: 1-25, 13-18, 11-21, 9-21
| Pts: Fanamby 14; Rebs: Kongho 6 Asts: Baïgo-Dari 2 | | Pts: Zenadi 19; Rebs: Zenadi 6 Asts: Guermat 3 |

Pavilhão do Maxaquene, Maputo

18 September 2009
16:00

Report

| Angola | 50–57 | Nigeria |
Scoring by quarter: 6-9, 17-13, 15-16, 12-19
| Pts: Xaussuale 11; Rebs: Celestino 4 Asts: Kavungo 2 | | Pts: Odia 17; Rebs: Odia 3 Asts: Ikima 1 |

Pavilhão do Maxaquene, Maputo

19 September 2009

| Guinea | 61–68 | Nigeria |

Pavilhão do Maxaquene, Maputo

19 September 2009
18:00

Report

| C.A.R. | 54–95 | Angola |
Scoring by quarter: 18-19, 11-25, 18-22, 7-19
| Pts: Fanamby 18; Rebs: Fanamby 5 Asts: Baïgo-Dari 3 | | Pts: Kavungo 21; Rebs: Délvio 8 Asts: P.Bastos 3 |

Pavilhão do Maxaquene, Maputo

20 September 2009

| Guinea | 85–36 | C.A.R. |

Pavilhão do Maxaquene, Maputo

20 September 2009
18:00

Report

| Algeria | 58–51 | Angola |
Scoring by quarter: 19-16, 13-11, 12-11, 14-13
| Pts: Guermat 9 Rebs: Zenadi 10; Asts: Berremila 5 | | Pts: Maconda 24; Rebs: Délvio 7 Asts: Kavungo 3 |

Pavilhão do Maxaquene, Maputo

21 September 2009
16:00

Report

| Nigeria | 89–71 | C.A.R. |
Scoring by quarter: 25-19, 16-20, 20-14, 28-18
| Pts: Obekpa 22; Rebs: Obekpa 7 Asts: Odia 4 | | Pts: Sekou-Cheik 15; Rebs: Fanamby 7 Asts: Baïgo-Dari 7 |

Pavilhão do Maxaquene, Maputo

21 September 2009
18:00

Report

| Algeria | 47–63 | Guinea |
Scoring by quarter: 9-14, 13-19, 12-12, 13-18
| Pts: Guermat 14; Rebs: Guermat 4 Asts: Safer 2 | | Pts: Kasse 13; Rebs: Barry 8 Asts: Kasse 3 |

Pavilhão do Maxaquene, Maputo

22 September 2009
18:00

Report

| Nigeria | 70–66 | Algeria |
Scoring by quarter: 17-13, 17-22, 15-15, 21-16
| Pts: Obekpa 25; Rebs: Obekpa 14; Asts: Yarkwan 3 | | Pts: Berremila 21; Rebs: Berremila 9 Asts: Guermat 4 |

Pavilhão do Maxaquene, Maputo

22 September 2009
14:00

Report

| Angola | 39–59 | Guinea |
Scoring by quarter: 9-17, 3-20, 7-5, 20-17
| Pts: P.Bastos 11; Rebs: Silva 8 Asts: Quimbamba 2 | | Pts: Mara 12; Rebs: Sidibe 6 Asts: Mara 3 |

Pavilhão do Maxaquene, Maputo

== Knockout stage ==
All matches were played in: Pavilhão do Maxaquene, Maputo

Quarter-finals
24 September
C.A.R. | 57
Mali | 83
24 September
Mozambique | 55
Algeria | 67
24 September
Nigeria | 79
South Africa | 50
24 September
Angola | 49
Egypt | 64

Semi-finals
25 September
Mali | 83
Algeria | 53
25 September
Nigeria | 71
Egypt | 74

Final
26 September
Mali | 82
Egypt | 84
Third place
26 September
Nigeria | 65
Algeria | 56

5th place bracket

Semi-finals
25 September
Mozambique | 63
C.A.R. | 57
25 September
Angola | 75
South Africa | 58

Fifth place
26 September
Mozambique | 61
Angola | 60
Seventh place
26 September
South Africa | 52
C.A.R. | 70

=== Quarterfinals ===
24 September 2009
11:00

Report

| C.A.R. | 57–83 | Mali |
Scoring by quarter: 11-24, 20-17, 18-19, 8-23
| Pts: Fanamby 28; Rebs: Sekou-Cheik 4 Asts: Sekou-Cheik 2 | | Pts: Moungoro 27; Rebs: D.Konaté 7 Asts: Sangaré 4 |

Pavilhão do Maxaquene, Maputo

24 September 2009
13:00

Report

| South Africa | 50–79 | Nigeria |
Scoring by quarter: 14-18, 15-9, 8-35, 13-17
| Pts: Festile 16; Rebs: Clark 5 Asts: Nondzaba 3 | | Pts: Yarkwan 21; Rebs: Obekpa 8 Asts: Garga 6 |

Pavilhão do Maxaquene, Maputo

24 September 2009
15:00

Report

| Angola | 49–64 | Egypt |
Scoring by quarter: 10-14, 8-14, 11-19, 20-17
| Pts: Maconda 9 Rebs: Xaussuale 6 Asts: P.Bastos 2 | | Pts: Mostafa 21; Rebs: Hamdy 6 Asts: Mostafa 2 |

Pavilhão do Maxaquene, Maputo

24 September 2009
17:00

Report

| Mozambique | 55–67 | Algeria |
| Pts: Cotela 13; Rebs: Manusse 14; Asts: Biasse 2 | | Pts: Safer 18; Rebs: Guermat 5 Asts: Ben Tayeb 6 |

Pavilhão do Maxaquene, Maputo

=== Seventh place game ===
25 September 2009
14:00

Report

| South Africa | 52–70 | C.A.R. |
Scoring by quarter: 15-7, 18-12, 13-12, 24-21
| Pts: Sissoko 13; Rebs: Sekou-Cheik 3 Asts: Baïgo-Dari 3 | | Pts: Paton 19; Rebs: Clark 4 Asts: Nondzaba 4 |

Pavilhão do Maxaquene, Maputo

=== Fifth place game ===
25 September 2009
16:00

Report

| Mozambique | 61–60 | Angola |
Scoring by quarter: 17-11, 6-9, 21-22, 17-18
| Pts: Chirindza 20; Rebs: Mula 6 Asts: Mondlane 4 | | Pts: Maconda 12; Rebs: Xaussuale 9 Asts: P.Bastos 2 |

Pavilhão do Maxaquene, Maputo

=== Semifinals ===
25 September 2009
18:00

Report

| Mali | 83–53 | Algeria |
Scoring by quarter: 15-13, 21-11, 24-10, 23-19
| Pts: Moungoro 21; Rebs: Konaté 12; Asts: Sangaré 5 | | Pts: Terai 23; Rebs: Terai 6 Asts: Guermat 3 |

Pavilhão do Maxaquene, Maputo

25 September 2009
20:00

Report

| Nigeria | 71–74 | Egypt |
Scoring by quarter: 10-22, 16-12, 22-21, 23-19
| Pts: Obekpa 16; Rebs: Obekpa 10; Asts: Odia 3 | | Pts: Mohamed 19; Rebs: Hamdy 15; Asts: Mostafa 4 |

Pavilhão do Maxaquene, Maputo

=== Bronze medal game ===
26 September 2009
18:00

Report

| Algeria | 56–65 | Nigeria |
Scoring by quarter: 12-12, 6-16, 22-20, 16-17
| Pts: Guermat 16; Rebs: Guermat 5 Asts: Guermat 4 | | Pts: Odia 18; Rebs: Obekpa 10; Asts: Yamsat 3 |

Pavilhão do Maxaquene, Maputo

=== Gold medal game ===
26 September 2009
20:00

Report

| Mali | 82–84 | Egypt |
Scoring by quarter: 19-26, 15-18, 18-18, 30-22
| Pts: F.Konaté 19; Rebs: D.Konaté 11; Asts: Sangaré 5 | | Pts: Mostafa 28; Rebs: Hamdy 7 Asts: Mostafa 2 |

Pavilhão do Maxaquene, Maputo

== Final standings ==
| Qualified for the 2010 U17 World Championship |
| Disqualified due to age fraud |

| Rank | Team | Record |
|---|---|---|
| Gold medal | Egypt | 5–1 |
| Silver medal | Mali | 5–1 |
| Bronze medal | Nigeria | 6–1 |
| 4. | Algeria | 4–3 |
| 5. | Mozambique | 3–3 |
| 6. | Angola | 2–5 |
| 7. | Central African Republic | 2–5 |
| 8. | South Africa | 0–6 |
| 9. | Guinea | 0–4 |

Egypt roster
Ahmed Gamal, Ahmed Hamdy, Ahmed Karoura, Ahmed Mostafa, Assem Gindy, Khaled Moftan, Mostafa Abousamra, Moustafa Ghazi, Omar Mohamed, Omar Yasser, Seif Samir, Youssef Shousha, Coach: Hesham Aboserea

== Awards ==
2009 FIBA Africa Under-16 Championship winner

Egypt
First title

Most Valuable Player
(Egypt) Ahmed Mostafa

All-Tournament Team

- (Algeria) G Mohamed Guermat
- (Egypt) PG Ahmed Mostafa MVP
- (Mali) F Boubacar Moungoro
- (Mozambique) PF René Manusse
- (Egypt) C Khaled Moftan

== Statistical leaders ==
=== Individual Tournament Highs ===
Points

| Rank | Name | G | Pts | PPG |
|---|---|---|---|---|
| 1 | (Egypt) Ahmed Mostafa | 6 | 147 | 24.5 |
| 2 | (Mali) Boubacar Moungoro | 7 | 163 | 23.3 |
| 3 | (Central African Republic) Freddy Fanamby | 7 | 137 | 19.6 |
| 4 | (Nigeria) Christopher Obekpa | 7 | 125 | 17.9 |
| 4 | (Egypt) Ahmed Hamdy | 7 | 125 | 17.9 |
| 6 | (Nigeria) Peter Odia | 7 | 110 | 15.7 |
| 7 | (Mozambique) Délio Chirindza | 4 | 55 | 13.8 |
| 8 | (South Africa) Nkosinathi Festile | 6 | 81 | 13.5 |
| 9 | (Algeria) Mohamed Guermat | 6 | 70 | 11.7 |
| 9 | (Egypt) Omar Mohamed | 6 | 70 | 11.7 |

Rebounds

| Rank | Name | G | Rbs | RPG |
|---|---|---|---|---|
| 1 | (Nigeria) Christopher Obekpa | 7 | 119 | 17 |
| 2 | (Egypt) Ahmed Hamdy | 7 | 89 | 12.7 |
| 3 | (Mali) Demba Konaté | 5 | 55 | 11 |
| 4 | (Mozambique) René Manusse | 7 | 72 | 10.3 |
| 5 | (Guinea) Bachir Diallo | 6 | 57 | 9.5 |
| 5 | (Angola) Joaquim Xaussuale | 6 | 57 | 9.5 |
| 7 | (Algeria) Mohamed Zenadi | 4 | 38 | 9.5 |
| 8 | (Guinea) Amadou Barry | 7 | 66 | 9.4 |
| 9 | (Guinea) Ibrahima Diallo | 6 | 50 | 8.3 |
| 10 | (South Africa) Siyabonga Mahlinza | 7 | 54 | 7.7 |

Assists

| Rank | Name | G | Ast | APG |
|---|---|---|---|---|
| 1 | (Mali) Amadou Sangaré | 7 | 25 | 3.6 |
| 2 | (Algeria) Mohamed Guermat | 7 | 20 | 2.9 |
| 2 | (Central African Republic) Dann Baïgo-Dari | 7 | 20 | 2.9 |
| 4 | (Nigeria) Daniel Garga | 7 | 17 | 2.4 |
| 4 | (Algeria) Mehdi Berremila | 7 | 17 | 2.4 |
| 6 | (Nigeria) Peter Odia | 7 | 16 | 2.3 |
| 7 | (Guinea) Yaya Kasse | 6 | 14 | 2.3 |
| 8 | (Guinea) Diomba Mara | 6 | 13 | 2.2 |
| 9 | (Egypt) Ahmed Mostafa | 7 | 13 | 1.9 |
| 10 | (South Africa) Lwando Nondzaba | 6 | 11 | 1.8 |

Steals

| Rank | Name | G | Sts | SPG |
|---|---|---|---|---|
| 1 | (Egypt) Ahmed Mostafa | 6 | 28 | 4.7 |
| 2 | (Nigeria) Christopher Obekpa | 6 | 23 | 3.8 |
| 2 | (Guinea) Donacien Camará | 6 | 23 | 3.8 |
| 4 | (Algeria) Mehdi Berremila | 7 | 25 | 3.6 |
| 5 | (Nigeria) Peter Odia | 7 | 23 | 3.3 |
| 6 | (Mozambique) Délio Chirindza | 6 | 20 | 3.3 |
| 7 | (South Africa) Nkosinathi Festile | 6 | 19 | 3.2 |
| 8 | (Mali) Boubacar Moungoro | 7 | 21 | 3 |
| 9 | (Mali) Amadou Sangaré | 6 | 17 | 2.8 |
| 10 | (Mali) Fousseini Konaté | 7 | 19 | 2.7 |

Blocks

| Rank | Name | G | Bks | BPG |
|---|---|---|---|---|
| 1 | | 7 | 31 | 4.4 |
| 2 | | 7 | 14 | 2 |
| 3 | | 6 | 9 | 1.5 |
| 4 | | 7 | 10 | 1.4 |
| 5 | | 5 | 6 | 1.2 |
| 6 | | 7 | 7 | 1 |
| 7 | | 6 | 6 | 1 |
| 8 | | 6 | 5 | 0.8 |
| 9 | | 5 | 4 | 0.8 |
| 10 | | 4 | 3 | 0.8 |

Minutes

| Rank | Name | G | Min | MPG |
|---|---|---|---|---|
| 1 | (Nigeria) Christopher Obekpa | 7 | 274 | 39.1 |
| 2 | (Nigeria) Peter Odia | 4 | 156 | 39 |
| 3 | (Central African Republic) Freddy Fanamby | 7 | 272 | 38.9 |
| 4 | (Algeria) Mohamed Guermat | 7 | 265 | 37.9 |
| 5 | (South Africa) Justin Paton | 4 | 148 | 37 |
| 6 | (Mozambique) Délio Chirindza | 7 | 248 | 35.4 |
| 7 | (Guinea) Oumar Condé | 6 | 207 | 34.5 |
| 8 | (Algeria) Azzedine Terai | 4 | 138 | 34.5 |
| 9 | (Egypt) Ahmed Mostafa | 7 | 228 | 32.6 |
| 10 | (Mali) Amadou Sangaré | 5 | 158 | 31.6 |

=== Individual Game Highs ===
| Department | Name | Total | Opponent |
|---|---|---|---|
| Points | (Central African Republic) Freddy Fanamby | 28 | Mali |
| Rebounds | (Egypt) Ahmed Hamdy | 15 | Nigeria |
| Assists | (Central African Republic) Dann Baïgo-Dari | 7 | Nigeria |
| Steals | (Nigeria) Christopher Obekpa | 7 | South Africa |
| 2-point field goal percentage | (Egypt) Ahmed Hamdy | 87.5% (7/8) | Mozambique |
| 3-point field goal percentage | (Central African Republic) Dann Baïgo-Dari (Angola) Pedro Bastos (Egypt) Omar Mohamed (Mali) Boubacar Moungoro (Egypt) Seif Samir (Mali) Amadou Sangare | 100% (2/2) | Angola; Mozambique |
| Free throw percentage | (Mozambique) René Manusse (Mozambique) Lucílio Mondlane (Mali) Salif Traoré | 100% (6/6) | Madagascar |
| Turnovers | (Mozambique) Délio Chirindza (Mozambique) Miguel Maconda (South Africa) Justin Paton (South Africa) Justin Paton | 9 | Gabon; Egypt; Egypt; Egypt |

=== Team Tournament Highs ===
Points per Game

| Pos. | Name | PPG |
|---|---|---|
| 1 | Mali | 92.3 |
| 2 | Egypt | 76.3 |
| 3 | Nigeria | 68.7 |
| 4 | Algeria | 61.8 |
| 5 | Guinea | 61.4 |
| 6 | Angola | 57.3 |
| 7 | Central African Republic | 44.3 |
| 8 | Mozambique | 44 |
| 9 | South Africa | 33.3 |

Total Points

| Pos. | Name | PPG |
|---|---|---|
| 1 | Mali | 646 |
| 2 | Egypt | 534 |
| 3 | Algeria | 430 |
| 4 | Nigeria | 412 |
| 5 | Angola | 401 |
| 6 | Central African Republic | 371 |
| 7 | Mozambique | 266 |
| 8 | South Africa | 264 |
| 9 | Guinea | 133 |

Rebounds

| Pos. | Name | RPG |
|---|---|---|
| 1 | Mali | 58.3 |
| 2 | Egypt | 52.3 |
| 3 | Nigeria | 50.4 |
| 4 | Guinea | 50.4 |
| 5 | Angola | 48.8 |
| 6 | Algeria | 45.7 |
| 7 | Mozambique | 45 |
| 8 | South Africa | 42.1 |
| 9 | Central African Republic | 34.2 |

Assists

| Pos. | Name | APG |
|---|---|---|
| 1 | Mali | 15.4 |
| 2 | Nigeria | 11.3 |
| 3 | Algeria | 10.8 |
| 4 | Egypt | 10.3 |
| 5 | Central African Republic | 9.9 |
| 6 | Angola | 7.1 |
| 7 | Mozambique | 5.5 |
| 8 | Guinea | 4.8 |
| 9 | South Africa | 3.8 |

Steals

| Pos. | Name | SPG |
|---|---|---|
| 1 | Mali | 19.1 |
| 2 | Nigeria | 16.3 |
| 3 | Guinea | 14.2 |
| 4 | Algeria | 12.2 |
| 5 | Egypt | 11.8 |
| 6 | Mozambique | 10.6 |
| 7 | Angola | 9.3 |
| 8 | South Africa | 8 |
| 9 | Central African Republic | 7.4 |

Blocks

| Pos. | Name | BPG |
|---|---|---|
| 1 | Nigeria | 5.9 |
| 2 | Mali | 5.4 |
| 3 | Mozambique | 4.5 |
| 4 | Angola | 4 |

2-point field goal percentage

| Pos. | Name | % |
|---|---|---|
| 1 | Mali | 54.4 |
| 2 | Egypt | 46.4 |
| 3 | Nigeria | 45.9 |
| 4 | Guinea | 39.1 |
| 5 | Central African Republic | 38.4 |
| 6 | Angola | 37.7 |
| 7 | Mozambique | 30.1 |
| 8 | Algeria | 25 |
| 9 | South Africa | 19.8 |

3-point field goal percentage

| Pos. | Name | % |
|---|---|---|
| 1 | Central African Republic | 25 |
| 2 | Nigeria | 21.6 |
| 3 | Angola | 17.9 |
| 4 | Egypt | 17.6 |
| 5 | Mali | 17.4 |
| 6 | Algeria | 17 |
| 7 | Guinea | 15.2 |
| 8 | South Africa | 13.1 |
| 9 | Mozambique | 10.1 |

Free throw percentage

| Pos. | Name | % |
|---|---|---|
| 1 | Guinea | 59.7 |
| 2 | Mali | 57.6 |
| 3 | Central African Republic | 53.2 |
| 4 | Egypt | 52.3 |
| 5 | Mozambique | 52.2 |
| 6 | Algeria | 50.8 |
| 7 | Angola | 45.3 |
| 8 | Nigeria | 44.9 |
| 9 | South Africa | 37.7 |

=== Team Game highs ===
| Department | Name | Total | Opponent |
|---|---|---|---|
| Points | Egypt | 111 | South Africa |
| Rebounds | Egypt | 55 | South Africa |
| Assists | Egypt | 17 | South Africa |
| Steals | Mali | 26 | South Africa |
| 2-point field goal percentage | Central African Republic | 85.7% (18/21) | South Africa |
| 3-point field goal percentage | Guinea | 60% (3/5) | Angola |
| Free throw percentage | Guinea | 87.5% (7/8) | Algeria |
| Turnovers | Central African Republic | 40 | Mozambique |

== See also ==
- 2010 FIBA Africa Under-18 Championship
