= Ethiopia men's national under-16 basketball team =

Ethiopia
- Joined FIBA: 1949
- FIBA zone: FIBA Africa
- National federation: Ethiopian Basketball Federation

U17 World Cup
- Appearances: None

U16 AfroBasket
- Appearances: 1 (2015)
- Medals: None
Home	Away

The Ethiopia men's national under-16 basketball team is a national basketball team of Ethiopia, administered by Ethiopian Basketball Federation (Amharic: ኢትዮጵያ የቅርጫት ኳስ ማህበር). It represents the country in men's international under-16 basketball competitions.

== 2015 U16 African Championship ==
The team qualified for the 2015 FIBA Africa Under-16 Championship in Bamako, Mali. There, the team finished in 11th place. As a debutant, Ethiopia, managed by coach Kasa, beat Morocco in their opening game 58-52.

Ethiopia was able to compete well against all other teams except Tunisia. Tunisia won the match 81-53. Ethiopia produced 37 turnovers, which led to 30 points for Tunisia. Ethiopia's Leul Brhane Tafere finished with 16 points, slightly below his tournament average.

Overall, Ethiopia's player Leul Brhane Tafere finished as the tournament's top scorer as he achieved 18.5 points per game, ahead of Morocco's Sami Al Wariachi, who had 16.0 points per game.

=== Aftermath ===
Tafere was later selected by the NBA and the world governing body FIBA as one of Africa's top basketball players aged 17 and under.

== See also ==
- Ethiopia men's national basketball team
