= 2015 FIBA Africa Under-16 Championship =

2015 FIBA U16 AfroBasket
4th FIBA Under-16 African Basketball Championship

Tournament details
- Host country: Mali
- Dates: July 30–August 8
- Teams: 12
- Venue: 1 (in 1 host city)

Final positions
- Champions: Egypt (3rd title)

Tournament statistics
- MVP: (Egypt) Ahmed Khalaf
- Top scorer: (Ethiopia) Tafere 18.5
- Top rebounds: (Egypt) Khalaf 12.2
- Top assists: (Egypt) Youssef 3.3
- PPG (Team): Egypt (94.1)
- RPG (Team): Egypt (59)
- APG (Team): Egypt (16.3)

Official website
- 2015 FIBA Africa Championship U-16

The 2015 FIBA Africa Under-16 Championship for Men (alternatively the Afrobasket U16) was the 4th U-16 FIBA Africa championship, organized by FIBA Africa and played under the auspices of the Fédération Internationale de Basketball, the basketball sport governing body and qualified for the 2016 FIBA Under-17 World Championship. The tournament was held from July 30 to August 8 at the Palais des sports à l’ACI 2000 in Bamako, Mali, contested by 11 national teams and won by Egypt.

== Format ==
- The 11 teams were divided into two groups (Groups A+B) for the preliminary round.
- Round robin for the preliminary round; the top four teams advanced to the quarterfinals.
- From there on a knockout system was used until the final.

== Draw ==
Group A	Group B
Algeria; Egypt; Equatorial Guinea; Mali; Nigeria; Rwanda	Angola; Ethiopia; Morocco; South Africa; Tunisia

== Preliminary round ==
Times given below are in UTC.

=== Group A ===
Qualified for the quarter-finals

Team	Pld	W	L	PF	PA	PD	Pts
Mali	5	5	0	402	245	+157	6
Egypt	5	4	1	522	263	+259	6
Algeria	5	3	2	317	316	+1	5
Nigeria	5	2	3	300	367	-67	4
Rwanda	5	1	4	271	360	-89	4
Equatorial Guinea	5	0	5	224	483	-259	3

30 July 2015
14:00

Report

Algeria	57–52	Nigeria
Scoring by quarter: 16-14, 17-16, 14-14, 10-8
Pts: Braik 15; Rebs: Oulahcene, Houari 6 Asts: Oulahcene 4		Pts: Ibrahim 16; Rebs: Ibrahim 13; Asts: Ajadi, Banire 3

Palais des Sports, Bamako
Referees: Riadh Khalladi (TUN), Osvaldo Fernandes (ANG)

19:00

Report

Mali	75–40	Rwanda
Scoring by quarter: 20-8, 12-8, 24-11, 19-13
Pts: Sissoko 15; Rebs: Sissoko 11; Asts: Coulibaly, Haidara 5		Pts: Sano 12; Rebs: three players 7 Asts: Sano, Kazeneza 2

Palais des Sports, Bamako
Referees: Djeri Nourou (TOG), Aboulaye Kamagate (CIV)

2 August 2015
16:00

[ Report]

Egypt	145–48	Equatorial Guinea
Scoring by quarter: 27-17, 37-2, 42-12, 39-17
Pts: Khalaf 25; Rebs: Khalaf 18; Asts: Karkoura 7		Pts: Nlavo 16; Rebs: Esuba 5 Asts: three players 2

Palais des Sports, Bamako
Referees: Abdoul Kader (NGR), Aboulaye Kamagate (CIV)

31 July 2015
16:00

Report

Egypt	95–36	Rwanda
Scoring by quarter: 10-17, 27-6, 30-8, 28-5
Pts: Abdrabou 18; Rebs: Abdrabou 10; Asts: Eesa 3		Pts: Sano 16; Rebs: 8 Asts: four players 1

Palais des Sports, Bamako

18:00

Report

Mali	73–47	Algeria
Scoring by quarter: 17-14, 17-17, 15-4, 24-12
Pts: Coulibaly 16; Rebs: Sissoko 17; Asts: Maiga 4		Pts: Sahbi 16; Rebs: Oulahcene 6 Asts: Sahbi 3

Palais des Sports, Bamako

20:00

Report

Equatorial Guinea	47–76	Nigeria
Scoring by quarter: 15-22, 12-4, 11-22, 9-28
Pts: Nsue 13; Rebs: Esuba, Ela 7 Asts: three players 1		Pts: Ibrahim 19; Rebs: Ibrahim 16; Asts: Ibrahim, Oriakhi 2

Palais des Sports, Bamako
Referees: Chaouki Massaoudi (MAR), Alioune Fall (SEN)

1 August 2015
12:00

Report

Algeria	56–100	Egypt
Scoring by quarter: 13-24, 8-22, 14-18, 21-36
Pts: Ramoul, Sahbi 12; Rebs: Taleb 6 Asts: Cheblaoui 2		Pts: Ramadan 15; Rebs: Mostafa 18; Asts: Mostafa 5

Palais des Sports, Bamako
Referees: Chaouki Massaoudi (MAR), Alioune Fall (SEN)

:1400

Report

Rwanda	83–52	Equatorial Guinea
Scoring by quarter: 21-14, 13-10, 28-11, 21-17
Pts: Kazeneza 25; Rebs: Kenny Rubaduka 11; Asts: Sano 7		Pts: Nlavo 13; Rebs: Marama 7 Asts: Owono 3

Palais des Sports, Bamako

18:00

Report

Mali	88–54	Nigeria
Scoring by quarter: 23-11, 12-21, 26-5, 27-17
Pts: Sissoko 22; Rebs: Sissoko 20; Asts: Keita 6		Pts: Ishau 12; Rebs: Ibrahim 7 Asts: Banire 4

Palais des Sports, Bamako
Referees: Aboulaye Kamagate (CIV), Zophila Mthembu (RSA)

3 August 2015
12:00

[ Report]

Rwanda	44–66	Algeria
Scoring by quarter: 9-20, 10-11, 9-17, 16-18
Pts: Rubaduka 21; Rebs: Kisa; Asts: Sano 22		Pts: Sahbi 16; Rebs: Cheblaoui 9 Asts: Oulahcene 5

Palais des Sports, Bamako
Referees: Abdoul Kader (NGR), Aboulaye Kamagate (CIV)

16:00

Report

Nigeria	46–107	Egypt
Scoring by quarter: 8-28, 11-30, 17-26, 10-23
Pts: Ibrahim 13; Rebs: Nwigwe 7 Asts: Ajadi 2		Pts: Khalaf 22; Rebs: Mostafa 11; Asts: Mostafa 4

Palais des Sports, Bamako

18:00

[ Report]

Equatorial Guinea	29–89	Mali
Scoring by quarter: 4-28, 6-27, 14-22, 5-12
Pts: Owono 8 Rebs: Esuba 12; Asts: Owono 3		Pts: Doumbia 13; Rebs: Diawara 10; Asts: Djire 6

Palais des Sports, Bamako
Referees: Riadh Khalladi (TUN), Osvaldo Fernandes (ANG)

4 August 2015
12:00

Report

Nigeria	72–68	Rwanda
Scoring by quarter: 13-10, 15-22, 22-23, 22-13
Pts: Ajadi 25; Rebs: Nwigwe 11; Asts: Banire 6		Pts: Nshizirungu 16; Rebs: Kisa 13; Asts: Niyonshuti 6

Palais des Sports, Bamako
Referees: Chaouki Massaoudi (MAR), Zophila Mthembu (RSA)

14:00

Report

Equatorial Guinea	48–90	Algeria
Scoring by quarter: 4-28, 8-21, 15-18, 21-23
Pts: Owono 13; Rebs: Maye 7 Asts: five players 1		Pts: Braik, Houari 24; Rebs: Braik 12; Asts: Belaouel 5

Palais des Sports, Bamako

18:00

Report

Mali	77–75	Egypt
Scoring by quarter: 15-21, 23-21, 18-9, 21-24
Pts: Haidara 20; Rebs: Coulibaly 10; Asts: Keita 5		Pts: Raafat 17; Rebs: Khalaf 13; Asts: Youssef 6

Palais des Sports, Bamako
Referees: Djeri Nourou (TOG), Aboulaye Kamagate (CIV)

=== Group B ===
Qualified for the quarter-finals

Team	Pld	W	L	PF	PA	PD	Pts
Angola	4	4	0	293	232	+61	8
South Africa	4	2	2	243	243	0	7
Tunisia	4	2	2	268	228	+40	6
Morocco	4	1	3	180	242	-62	5
Ethiopia	4	1	3	187	243	-56	4

30 July 2015
12:00

Report

Morocco	52–58	Ethiopia
Scoring by quarter: 13-12, 14-12, 9-20, 22-8
Pts: Mankour 20; Rebs: Laghouizi 13; Asts: Al Uariachi, Marroun 2		Pts: Tafere 22; Rebs: Nyach, Tut 8 Asts: Gezahegn 8

Palais des Sports, Bamako
Referees: Youssouf Maiga (MLI), Didier Gaga (RWA)

16:00

Report

South Africa	46–54	Angola
Scoring by quarter: 15-10, 11-8, 12-18, 8-18
Pts: Meela 12; Rebs: Geldenhuys 12; Asts: five players 1		Pts: Artur 13; Rebs: Glofate 10; Asts: Hélder, Edvaldo 2

Palais des Sports, Bamako

31 July 2015
12:00

Report

Tunisia	49–54	South Africa
Scoring by quarter: 13-20, 15-10, 12-11, 9-13
Pts: Sohail 14; Rebs: Sohail, Ben Salah 10; Asts: four players 2		Pts: Meela, Geldenhuys 13; Rebs: Westermeyer 10; Asts: three players 2

Palais des Sports, Bamako

14:00

Report

Angola	79–61	Ethiopia
Scoring by quarter: 23-11, 10-9, 20-22, 26-19
Pts: Glofate 18; Rebs: Glofate 13; Asts: Dideltino 4		Pts: Tafere 24; Rebs: Alemu 11; Asts: Tafere, Robi 4

Palais des Sports, Bamako
Referees: Fethi Chaib (ALG), Wael Mostafa (EGY)

1 August 2015
10:00

Report

Ethiopia	53–81	Tunisia
Scoring by quarter: 8-20, 9-18, 19-24, 17-19
Pts: Tafere 16; Rebs: Tut 7 Asts: Berhe 3		Pts: Marnaoui 16; Rebs: Ben Salah 8 Asts: Sohail, Khallala 3

Palais des Sports, Bamako

16:00

Report

Angola	81–53	Morocco
Scoring by quarter: 29-8, 22-13, 13-11, 17-21
Pts: Hélder 15; Rebs: Glofate 15; Asts: Dideltino 3		Pts: Mankour 23; Rebs: three players 6 Asts: El Kalma 3

Palais des Sports, Bamako

3 August 2015
14:00

Report

Morocco	40–61	Tunisia
Scoring by quarter: 10-14, 12-16, 10-19, 8-12
Pts: El Kalma 13; Rebs: Kouraichi 7 Asts: Akouass 1		Pts: Jammali 13; Rebs: Ben Salah 13; Asts: four players 2

Palais des Sports, Bamako
Referees: Djeri Nourou (TOG), Didier Gaga (RWA)

21:00

Report

South Africa	vs.	Ethiopia
Scoring by quarter: 13-20, 10-20, -, -
Pts: Meela 25; Rebs: Westermeyer 11; Asts: Meela 3		Pts: Tafere 22; Rebs: Tut 13; Asts: Gezahegn 4

Palais des Sports, Bamako
Referees: Aboulaye Kamagate (CIV), Youssouf Maiga (MLI)

4 August 2015
16:00

Report

Morocco	68–73	South Africa
Scoring by quarter: 15-20, 13-12, 27-21, 13-20
Pts: Al Uariachi 20; Rebs: Mankour 6 Asts: El Kalma 5		Pts: Ter Mors 19; Rebs: Westermeyer 10; Asts: Ntshele 4

Palais des Sports, Bamako
Referees: Abdoul Kader (NGR), Fethi Chaib (ALG)

20:00

Report

Angola	84–69	Tunisia
Scoring by quarter: 18-17, 22-13, 28-14, 16-25
Pts: Glofate 30; Rebs: Glofate, Benedito 8 Asts: Dideltino 4		Pts: Sohail 23; Rebs: Sohail 10; Asts: Amiri 2

Palais des Sports, Bamako
Referees: Youssouf Maiga (MLI), Wael Mostafa (EGY)

== Knockout stage ==
All matches were played in: Palais des Sports à l’ACI 2000, Bamako

Quarter-finals
6 August 2015
Nigeria	48
Angola	79
6 August 2015
Tunisia	85
Egypt	93
6 August 2015
Algeria	62
South Africa	41
6 August 2015
Morocco	34
Mali	76

Semi-finals
7 August 2015
Angola	51
Egypt	74
7 August 2015
Mali	65
Algeria	39

Final
August 2015
Mali	63
Egypt	64
Third place
August 2015
Algeria	45
Angola	37

5th place bracket

Semi-finals
7 August 2015
Morocco	60
South Africa	49
7 August 2015
Nigeria	56
Tunisia	49

Fifth place
August 2015
Morocco	53
Nigeria	65
Seventh place
August 2015
South Africa	67
Tunisia	76

=== Classification 9-11 ===
6 August 2015
10:00

Report

Equatorial Guinea	58–53	Ethiopia
Scoring by quarter: 13-14, 13-7, 10-15, 22-17
Pts: Nlavo 16; Rebs: Esuba 20; Asts: Nlavo 3		Pts: Gebregiorgies 14; Rebs: Tut, Alemu 14; Asts: Tut, Haile 3

Palais des Sports, Bamako
Referees: Osvaldo Fernandes (ANG), Hussaini Gumel (NGR)

=== Quarterfinals ===
6 August 2015
12:00

[ Report]

Nigeria	48–79	Angola
Scoring by quarter: 8-19, 12-18, 15-25, 13-17
Pts: Ajadi, Banire 7 Rebs: Nwigwe 15; Asts: Ishau 4		Pts: Hélder 15; Rebs: Rifen 10; Asts: Délcio, Selton 3

Palais des Sports, Bamako
Referees: Alioune Fall (SEN), Chaouki Massaoudi (MAR), Zophila Mthembu (RSA)

14:00

Report

Tunisia	85–93	Egypt
Scoring by quarter: 25-18, 17-22, 20-27, 23-26
Pts: Sohail 25; Rebs: Sohail 7 Asts: Amiri 3		Pts: Ramadan 16; Rebs: Mostafa 10; Asts: Youssef 4

Palais des Sports, Bamako
Referees: Youssouf Maiga (MLI), Abdoul Kader (NGR), Fethi Chaib (ALG)

16:00

Report

Algeria	62–41	South Africa
Scoring by quarter: 17-14, 16-6, 15-13, 14-8
Pts: Braik 22; Rebs: Taleb 7 Asts: Oulahcene 4		Pts: Meela, Beukes 8 Rebs: Geldenhuys 6 Asts: Ter Mors 2

Palais des Sports, Bamako

18:00

Report

Morocco	34–76	Mali
Scoring by quarter: 7-24, 11-14, 9-20, 7-18
Pts: Mankour 10; Rebs: Mankour 13; Asts: Al Uariachi 3		Pts: Coulibaly 16; Rebs: Diawara 10; Asts: Diallo 4

Palais des Sports, Bamako
Referees: Djeri Nourou (TOG), Riadh Khalladi (TUN), Osvaldo Fernandes (ANG)

=== Classification 5–8 ===
7 August 2015
12:00

Report

Morocco	60–49	South Africa
Scoring by quarter: 12-13, 13-14, 18-14, 17-8
Pts: Al Uariachi 29; Rebs: Al Uariachi, Froud 6 Asts: El Kalma, Eddine 3		Pts: Ntshele 14; Rebs: Ntshele, Geldenhuys 6 Asts: Geldenhuys, Meela 2

Palais des Sports, Bamako
Referees: Fethi Chaib (ALG), Youssouf Maiga (MLI), Didier Gaga (RWA)

14:00

Report

Nigeria	56–49	Tunisia
Scoring by quarter: 16-12, 10-14, 13-15, 17-8
Pts: Ajadi 16; Rebs: Nwigwe 10; Asts: Ajadi 5		Pts: Jammali 10; Rebs: Sohail 10; Asts: Amiri 3

Palais des Sports, Bamako
Referees: Wael Mostafa (EGY), Osvaldo Fernandes (ANG), Zophila Mthembu (RSA)

=== Semifinals ===
7 August 2015
16:00

Report

Angola	51–74	Egypt
Scoring by quarter: 15-20, 13-26, 19-16, 4-12
Pts: Rifen 19; Rebs: Glofate 10; Asts: Artur, Délcio 3		Pts: Khalaf, Raafat 17; Rebs: Khalaf 17; Asts: Raafat 4

Palais des Sports, Bamako
Referees: Aboulaye Kamagate (CIV), Riadh Khalladi (TUN), Alioune Fall (SEN)

August
18:00

Report

Mali	65–39	Algeria
Scoring by quarter: 26-3, 15-13, 17-13, 7-10
Pts: Coulibaly 11; Rebs: Coulibaly 11; Asts: Haidara 4		Pts: Braik 9 Rebs: Braik 5 Asts: Oulahcene 3

Palais des Sports, Bamako
Referees: Djeri Nourou (TOG), Abdoul Kader (NGR), Chaouki Massaoudi (MAR)

=== Ninth place game ===
7 August 2015
10:00

Report

Rwanda	73–56	Equatorial Guinea
Scoring by quarter: 20-7, 12-15, 10-13, 31-21
Pts: three players 15; Rebs: Nshizirungu 13; Asts: Niyonshuti 5		Pts: Esuba 18; Rebs: Esuba 12; Asts: Nsue 4

Palais des Sports, Bamako
Referees: Wael Mostafa (EGY), Hussaini Gumel (NGR)

=== Seventh place game ===
8 August 2015
10:00

Report

South Africa	67–76	Tunisia
Scoring by quarter: 13-24, 17-14, 13-24, 24-14
Pts: Meela 21; Rebs: Meela 8 Asts: four players 2		Pts: Jammali, Marnaoui 22; Rebs: Sohail 21; Asts: Berrached 4

Palais des Sports, Bamako
Referees: Fethi Chaib (ALG), Chaouki Massaoudi (MAR), Osvaldo Fernandes (ANG)

=== Fifth place game ===
8 August 2015
12:00

Report

Morocco	53–65	Nigeria
Scoring by quarter: 10-13, 9-13, 18-21, 16-18
Pts: Al Uariachi 20; Rebs: Laghouizi, Eddine 7 Asts: Al Uariachi 3		Pts: Oriakhi 18; Rebs: Nwigwe 13; Asts: three players 3

Palais des Sports, Bamako
Referees: Wael Mostafa (EGY), Didier Gaga (RWA), Zophila Mthembu (RSA)

=== Bronze medal game ===
8 August 2015
14:00

Report

Algeria	45–37	Angola
Scoring by quarter: 16-5, 10-15, 8-11, 11-6
Pts: Braik 19; Rebs: Taleb 8 Asts: Cheblaoui 3		Pts: Rifen 15; Rebs: Glofate 16; Asts: Selton 3

Palais des Sports, Bamako
Referees: Youssouf Maiga (MLI), Djeri Nourou (TOG), Abdoul Kader (NGR)

=== Gold medal game ===
August
16:00

Report

Mali	63–64	Egypt
Scoring by quarter: 6-12, 13-11, 15-15, 29-26
Pts: Sissoko 16; Rebs: Sissoko 16; Asts: Sissoko, Maiga 2		Pts: Khalaf 16; Rebs: Khalaf 16; Asts: Youssef 6

Palais des Sports, Bamako
Referees: Riadh Khalladi (TUN), Aboulaye Kamagate (CIV), Alioune Fall (SEN)

== Final standings ==
Qualified for the 2016 FIBA U17 World Championship

Rank	Team	Record
Gold medal	Egypt	7–1
Silver medal	Mali	7–1
Bronze medal	Algeria	5–1
4.	Angola	5–3
5.	Nigeria	4–4
6.	Morocco	2–5
7.	Tunisia	3–4
8.	South Africa	2–5
9.	Rwanda	2–4
10.	Equatorial Guinea	1–6
11.	Ethiopia	1–4

Egypt roster
Abdelrahman Abdelmaged, Ahmed Khalaf, Esam Mostafa, Hassan Elkhouga, Marwan Eesa, Mohamed Elsayed, Mohamed Hassan, Mohamed Ramadan, Mohamed Youssef, Omar Karkoura, Taref Raafat, Youssef Abdrabou, Coach: Bramislay Jeme

== Awards ==
2015 FIBA Africa Under-16 Championship winner

Egypt
Third title

Most Valuable Player
(Egypt) Ahmed Khalaf

=== All-Tournament Team ===
- (Morocco) Sami Al Uariachi
- (Egypt) Ahmed Khalaf MVP
- (Algeria) Mostefa Braik
- (Mali) Abdoulkarim Coulibaly
- (Egypt) Esam Mostafa

== Statistical leaders ==
=== Individual Tournament Highs ===
Points

Rank	Name	G	Pts	PPG
1	(Ethiopia) Leul Tafere	4	74	18.5
2	(Morocco) Sami Al Uariachi	6	96	16
3	(Algeria) Mostafa Braik	8	120	15
4	(Angola) Glofate Buiamba	7	104	14.9
4	(Egypt) Ahmed Khalaf	8	118	14.8
6	(Mali) Abdoulkarim Coulibaly	8	117	14.6
7	(Tunisia) Mohamed Jammali	7	99	14.1
8	(South Africa) Clinton Meela	7	94	13.4
9	(Tunisia) Tarek Sohail	7	91	13
9	(Morocco) Omar Mankour	6	75	12.5

Rebounds

Rank	Name	G	Rbs	RPG
1	(Egypt) Ahmed Khalaf	8	98	12.2
2	(Angola) Glofate Buiamba	7	81	11.6
3	(Mali) Moulaye Sissoko	8	88	11
4	(Rwanda) Enoch Kisa	6	59	9.8
5	(Ethiopia) Reat Tut	4	39	9.8
5	(Egypt) Esam Mostafa	8	75	9.4
7	(Nigeria) Chukwumene Nwigwe	8	74	9.3
8	(Equatorial Guinea) Ángel Esuba	7	65	9.2
9	(Tunisia) Tarek Sohail	7	64	9.1
10	(Mali) Blaise Keita	8	64	8

Assists

Rank	Name	G	Ast	APG
1	(Egypt) Mohamed Youssef	8	26	3.3
2	(Mali) Makan Keita	8	25	3.1
2	(Algeria) Amine Oulahcene	8	22	2.8
4	(Rwanda) Gasana Sano	6	16	2.7
4	(Rwanda) Samuel Niyonshuti	6	15	2.5
6	(Ethiopia) Leul Tafere	4	10	2.5
7	(Mali) Lassana Haidara	8	19	2.4
8	(Mali) Abdoulkarim Coulibaly	8	18	2.3
9	(Morocco) Hatim El Kalma	6	14	2.3
10	(Nigeria) Isiaka Ajadi	8	17	2.1

2-point field goal percentage

Rank	Name	2PA	2PM	2P%
1	(Angola) Glofate Buiamba	59	36	61
2	(Egypt) Ahmed Khalaf	82	48	58.5
3	(Egypt) Mohamed Ramadan	61	34	55.7
4	(Mali) Moulaye Sissoko	84	45	53.6
5	(Egypt) Esam Mostafa	51	27	52.9
6	(Egypt) Youssef Abdrabou	48	25	52.1
7	(Tunisia) Mohamed Jammali	43	22	51.2
8	(Morocco) Sami Al Uariachi	36	17	47.2
9	(Mali) Lassana Haidara	68	32	47.1
10	(Ethiopia) Leul Tafere	34	16	47.1

3-point field goal percentage

Rank	Name	3PA	3PM	3P%
1	(South Africa) Yanick Ter Mors	16	6	37.5
2	(Morocco) Sami Al Uariachi	40	13	32.5
3	(Angola) Hélder Fernandes	31	10	32.3
4	(Tunisia) Mohamed Jammali	50	16	32
5	(Egypt) Mohamed Youssef	32	10	31.2
6	(South Africa) Latrell Beukes	29	9	31
7	(Mali) Abdoulkarim Coulibaly	43	13	30.2
8	(Angola) Rifen Miguel	24	7	29.2
9	(Algeria) Mohamed Sahbi	35	10	28.6
10	(Rwanda) Patrick Nshizirungu	22	6	27.3

Free throw percentage

Rank	Name	FTA	FTM	FT%
1	(Morocco) Sami Al Uariachi	26	23	88.5
2	(Algeria) Lofti Ramoul	25	21	84
3	(South Africa) Sicelo Dzingwa	24	19	79.2
4	(Egypt) Taref Raafat	32	23	71.9
5	(Mali) Blaise Keita	24	16	66.7
6	(Angola) Glofate Buiamba	31	20	64.5
7	(Algeria) Mostafa Braik	41	26	63.4
8	(Egypt) Mohamed Elsayed	30	19	63.3
9	(South Africa) Markus Geldenhuys	49	31	63.3
10	(Tunisia) Oussama Marnaoui	29	18	62.1

Steals

Rank	Name	G	Sts	SPG
1	(Algeria) Mostafa Braik	8	35	4.4
2	(Equatorial Guinea) Vicente Owono	7	19	2.7
2	(Equatorial Guinea) Reginaldo Nsue	7	18	2.6
4	(Nigeria) Isiaka Ajadi	8	19	2.4
5	(Equatorial Guinea) Luis Nlavo	7	17	2.4
6	(Mali) Abdoulkarim Coulibaly	8	17	2.1
7	(Equatorial Guinea) Ángel Esuba	7	15	2.1
8	(South Africa) Kuhle Ntshele	7	15	2.1
9	(Egypt) Mohamed Youssef	8	16	2
10	(Algeria) Amine Oulahcene	8	14	1.8

Blocks

Rank	Name	G	Bks	BPG
1	(Ethiopia) Reat Tut	4	15	3.8
2	(Egypt) Ahmed Khalaf	8	28	3.5
3	(Egypt) Esam Mostafa	8	14	1.8
4	(Nigeria) Olajuwon Ibrahim	8	12	1.5
5	(Ethiopia) Muluken Melaku	4	6	1.5
6	(Mali) Abdoulkarim Coulibaly	8	11	1.4
7	(Angola) Glofate Buiamba	7	9	1.3
8	(Morocco) Mohammed Kouraichi	5	6	1.2
9	(Rwanda) Arnaud Nkusi	6	6	1
10	(Nigeria) Chukwumene Nwigwe	8	7	0.9

Turnovers

Rank	Name	G	Tos	TPG
1	(Equatorial Guinea) Vicente Owono	7	54	7.7
2	(Rwanda) Gasana Sano	6	46	7.7
3	(Equatorial Guinea) Luis Nlavo	7	50	7.1
4	(Morocco) Omar Mankour	6	42	7
5	(Ethiopia) Leul Tafere	4	24	6
6	(Rwanda) Emile Kazeneza	6	34	5.7
7	(Equatorial Guinea) Reginaldo Nsue	7	37	5.3
8	(Rwanda) Enoch Kisa	6	31	5.2
9	(Rwanda) Samuel Niyonshuti	6	29	4.8
10	(South Africa) Clinton Meela	7	33	4.7

=== Individual Game Highs ===
Department	Name	Total	Opponent
Points	(Angola) Glofate Buiamba	30	Tunisia
Rebounds	(Tunisia) Tarek Sohail	21	South Africa
Assists	(Egypt) Omar Karkoura (Rwanda) Gasana Sano	7	Equatorial Guinea
Steals	(Algeria) Mostafa Braik	9	Equatorial Guinea
Blocks	(Ethiopia) Reat Tut	7	Equatorial Guinea
2-point field goal percentage	(Rwanda) Emile Kazeneza	88.9% (8/9)	Equatorial Guinea
3-point field goal percentage	(Angola) Glofate Buiamba	100% (3/3)	Tunisia
Free throw percentage	(Nigeria) Owen Oriakhi	100% (8/8)	Equatorial Guinea
Turnovers	(Equatorial Guinea) Vicente Owono (Rwanda) Gasana Sano	18	Rwanda; Egypt

=== Team Tournament Highs ===
Points

Pos.	Name	PPG
1	Egypt	94.1
2	Mali	75.8
3	Tunisia	67.4
4	Angola	66.4
5	Ethiopia	60
6	Nigeria	58.6
7	Algeria	57.8
8	Rwanda	57.3
9	South Africa	57.1
10	Morocco	51.3

Rebounds

Pos.	Name	RPG
1	Egypt	59
2	Mali	56
3	Ethiopia	52.5
4	Rwanda	52.3
5	Angola	47.7
6	Tunisia	44.7
7	Equatorial Guinea	42.4
8	Nigeria	41.8
9	Morocco	41.2
10	South Africa	40.9

Assists

Pos.	Name	APG
1	Egypt	16.5
2	Mali	15.9
3	Angola	11.6
4	Nigeria	10.5
5	Rwanda	10.5
6	Ethiopia	10.5
7	Tunisia	10.1
8	Algeria	9.4
9	Morocco	8.2
10	South Africa	7.3

Steals

Pos.	Name	SPG
1	Algeria	13.3
2	Equatorial Guinea	13.3
3	Mali	11.5
4	Egypt	10.6
5	Nigeria	8.8
6	Rwanda	8.7
7	South Africa	8.6
8	Angola	8.4
9	Morocco	7.8
10	Ethiopia	7.3

Blocks

Pos.	Name	BPG
1	Ethiopia	7
2	Egypt	6.9
3	Mali	4.8
4	Rwanda	4.7
5	Angola	3.7
6	Nigeria	3.1
7	Morocco	2.3
8	Tunisia	2.1
9	Algeria	1.6
10	South Africa	1.6

Turnovers

Pos.	Name	TPG
1	Rwanda	38.7
2	Equatorial Guinea	37.4
3	Ethiopia	33.5
4	Morocco	26.2
5	South Africa	25.3
6	Nigeria	23.9
7	Tunisia	23.6
8	Angola	22.9
9	Egypt	21.5
10	Algeria	20.3

2-point field goal percentage

Pos.	Name	%
1	Egypt	55.9
2	Angola	46.9
3	Tunisia	43.7
4	Mali	43.5
5	Nigeria	39
6	Ethiopia	39
7	South Africa	39
8	Rwanda	37.5
9	Algeria	35.6
10	Morocco	34.9

3-point field goal percentage

Pos.	Name	%
1	Egypt	24.8
2	Rwanda	24.3
3	Morocco	23.3
4	Tunisia	22.1
5	Mali	21.6
6	Algeria	20.7
7	Ethiopia	20
8	South Africa	18.9
9	Angola	18.5
10	Nigeria	16.8

Free throw percentage

Pos.	Name	%
1	Tunisia	55.6
2	South Africa	54
3	Morocco	54
4	Egypt	53.2
5	Nigeria	52.6
6	Angola	51.9
7	Rwanda	47.2
8	Algeria	46.6
9	Mali	40.3
10	Equatorial Guinea	38.2

=== Team Game highs ===
Department	Name	Total	Opponent
Points	Egypt	145	Equatorial Guinea
Rebounds	Egypt	83	Equatorial Guinea
Assists	Egypt	27	Equatorial Guinea
Steals	Algeria	30	Equatorial Guinea
Blocks	Ethiopia	15	Equatorial Guinea
2-point field goal percentage	Egypt	71.2% (57/80)	Equatorial Guinea
3-point field goal percentage	Rwanda	72.7% (8/11)	Equatorial Guinea
Free throw percentage	Tunisia	66.7% (22/33)	Egypt
Turnovers	Equatorial Guinea; Ethiopia	41	Algeria; Equatorial Guinea

== See also ==
- 2016 FIBA Africa Under-18 Championship
