= Angola men's national under-16 and under-17 basketball team =

Angola
- Joined FIBA: 1979
- FIBA zone: FIBA Africa
- National federation: Federação Angolana de Basquetebol

U17 World Cup
- Appearances: 1
- Medals: None

U16 AfroBasket
- Appearances: 7
- Medals: (gold) Gold: 1 (2013)
Away

The Angola men's national under-16 and under-17 basketball team is a national basketball team of Angola, administered by the Federação Angolana de Basquetebol. It represents the country in international under-16 and under-17 men's basketball competitions.

== FIBA U16 AfroBasket record ==
Year	Reached	Position	Pld	W	L	PF	PA	PD
(Mali) Maputo 2009	Quarter-finals	6th	7	3	4	419	411	+8
(Egypt) Alexandria 2011	Semi-finals	4th	6	3	3	297	336	−39
(Madagascar) Antananarivo 2013	Champions	1st	7	6	1	534	401	+133
(Mali) Bamako 2015	Semi-finals	4th	7	5	2	460	399	+61
(Mauritius) Vacoas-Phoenix 2017	Did not participate							
(Cape Verde) Praia 2019	Quarter-finals	7th	7	3	4	464	488	–24
(Egypt) Cairo 2021	Did not participate							
(Tunisia) Monastir & Jemmal 2023	Semi-finals	4th	7	4	3	432	437	–5
(Rwanda) Kigali 2025	Quarter-finals	7th	5	3	2	313	281	+32
Total	7/9	1 title	46	27	19	2,919	2,753	+166

== FIBA Under-17 Basketball World Cup record ==
Year	Pos.	Pld	W	L
(Germany) 2010	Did not qualify			
(Lithuania) 2012	Did not qualify			
(United Arab Emirates) 2014	11th	7	3	4
(Spain) 2016	Did not qualify			
(Argentina) 2018	Did not qualify			
(Spain) 2022	Did not qualify			
(Turkey) 2024	Did not qualify			
(Turkey) 2026	Did not qualify			
(Greece) 2028	To be determined			
Total	1/9	7	3	4

== Roster (2014) ==
Angola U-16 Basketball Team - 2015 FIBA Africa Championship roster
Players
Coaches

Pos.	No.	Name	Age – Date of birth	Height	Club	Ctr.
	4	Selton Miguel	14 – 24 August 2000		Benfica de Lisboa	(Angola)
	5	Shelson Sanjoaneira	16 – 27 June 1999		Vila Clotilde	(Angola)
	6	Edvaldo Simão	15 – 30 March 2000		Sporting de Benguela	(Angola)
	7	Hélder Fernandes	15 – 3 October 1999		ASA	(Angola)
	8	Gil da Silva	15 – 11 January 2000		Petro Atlético	(Angola)
	9	Dideltino Américo	16 – 1 August 1999		1º de Agosto	(Angola)
	10	Glofate Buiamba	16 – 5 January 1999		ASA	(Angola)
	11	Artur Sacarrolha (C)	16 – 30 June 1999		ASA	(Angola)
	12	Wilson Ambrósio	16 – 6 August 1999		1º de Agosto	(Angola)
	13	Rifen Miguel	16 – 4 May 1999		Benfica de Lisboa	(Portugal)
	14	Délcio Sebastião	16 – 23 February 1999		1º de Agosto	(Angola)
	15	Benedito Sambongue	15 – 19 January 2000		Petro Atlético	(Angola)

Head coach

- Jacinto Olim Jabila

Assistant coach(es)

- Miguel Lutonda

Physio

- Igor Cordeiro

Legend

- (C) Team captain
- nat field describes country

== Players ==
Angola men's u16 and u17 basketball players 2009–2017

A = African championship; A = African championship winner; W = World cup

#	Name	A	P	H	Club	A.P.	E.D.	M. Silva Gi		J.O.	R.R.
#	Name	A	P	H	Club	2009	2011	2013	2014	2015	2017
#	Name	A	P	H	Club	6	4	1	11	4	–
⋅	Agostinho Mayene	-	-	-	(Angola) PRI	-	-	-	-	-	2017
⋅	Aires Goubel	17	SG	1.92	(Angola) PRI	-	-	11	11	-	-
⋅	Alcane Paka	-	-	-	(Angola) PET	-	-	-	-	-	2017
⋅	Aldair Carlos	15	-	-	(Angola) PET	-	7	-	-	-	-
⋅	Alexandre Jungo	16	F	1.98	(Angola) VIL	-	-	12	12	-	-
⋅	Ângelo Alexandre	-	-	-	(Angola) PRO	-	-	-	-	-	2017
⋅	António Congo	14	-	-	(Angola) PET	-	6	-	-	-	-
⋅	António Segunda	-	-	-	(Angola) MAI	-	-	-	-	-	2017
⋅	Aristide Garcia	-	-	-	(Angola) LIB	-	-	-	-	-	2017
⋅	Artur Sacarrolha	16	-	-	(Angola) ASA	-	-	-	-	11	-
⋅	Avelino Dó	17	SG	1.93	(Angola) PET	-	-	7	7	-	-
⋅	Benedito Sambongue	15	-	-	(Angola) PET	-	-	-	-	15	-
⋅	Benvindo Quimbamba	16	-	-	(Angola) PRI	4	-	-	-	-	-
⋅	Bruno Santos	16	C	2.02	(Angola) PET	-	-	13	13	-	-
⋅	Carlos Cabral	15	-	-	(Angola) PRI	-	13	-	-	-	-
⋅	Celestino Neto	15	-	-	(Portugal) SEI	14	-	-	-	-	-
⋅	Cesaltino António	-	-	-	(Angola) MAI	-	-	-	-	-	2017
⋅	Cley Cabanga	14	-	-	(Angola) PET	-	-	10	-	-	-
⋅	Cristiano Xavier	16	SG	1.98	(Angola) PET	-	-	15	15	-	-
⋅	Damba Lenda	16	-	-	(Angola) SBG	-	12	-	-	-	-
⋅	Daniel Manuel	17	G	1.80	(Angola) VIL	-	-	5	5	-	-
⋅	Délcio Sebastião	16	-	-	(Angola) PRI	-	-	-	-	14	-
⋅	Délvio Lima	15	-	-	(Angola) PRI	11	-	-	-	-	-
⋅	Denilson Fernandes	-	-	-	(Angola) FER	-	-	-	-	-	2017
⋅	Denilson Paulo	-	-	-	(Angola) PET	-	-	-	-	-	2017
⋅	Dideltino Américo	16	-	-	(Angola) PRI	-	-	-	-	9	-
⋅	Duarte Vicente	15	-	-	(Angola) PET	-	15	-	-	-	-
⋅	Edmilson Miranda	16	G	1.82	(Angola) PET	-	-	8	8	-	-
⋅	Edvaldo Simão	15	-	-	(Angola) SBG	-	-	-	-	6	-
⋅	Edvânio dos Santos	-	-	-	(Angola) FER	-	-	-	-	-	2017
⋅	Emanuel da Costa	-	-	-	(Angola) CPL	-	-	-	-	-	2017
⋅	Emanuel Sebastião	-	-	-	(Angola) INT	-	-	-	-	-	2017
⋅	Emanuel Silva	-	-	-	(Angola) PRO	-	-	-	-	-	2017
⋅	Eric Amândio	16	G	1.86	(Angola) PET	-	-	4	4	-	-
⋅	Erickson Silva	16	-	-	(Angola) PET	10	-	-	-	-	-
⋅	Esmael Bargão	15	-	-	(Angola) PRI	-	10	-	-	-	-
⋅	Esmael Batista	-	-	-	(Angola) PRI	-	-	-	-	-	2017
⋅	Fernando Kambuando	15	-	-	(Angola) PRI	-	11	-	-	-	-
⋅	Francisco Mieze	14	-	-	(Angola) PRI	15	-	-	-	-	-
⋅	Franklim Rocha	-	-	-	(Angola) PET	-	-	-	-	-	2017
⋅	Gerson Calunga	-	-	-	(Angola) ASA	-	-	-	-	-	2017
⋅	Gil da Silva	15	-	-	(Angola) PET	-	-	-	-	8	-
⋅	Glofate Buiamba	16	-	-	(Angola) ASA	-	-	-	-	10	-
⋅	Godalfim Freitas	16	-	-	(Angola) INT	13	-	-	-	-	-
⋅	Hélder Fernandes	15	-	-	(Angola) ASA	-	-	-	-	7	-
⋅	Isaac Bartolomeu	-	-	-	(Angola) INT	-	-	-	-	-	2017
⋅	Ivanádio Menezes	15	-	-	(Angola) PRI	6	-	-	-	-	-
⋅	Joaquim Xuassuale	15	-	-	(Angola) PRI	12	-	-	-	-	-
⋅	Joel Domingos	14	-	-	(Angola) PRI	5	-	-	-	-	-
⋅	José Cabasu	-	-	-	(Angola) ASA	-	-	-	-	-	2017
⋅	José Celelessa	-	-	-	(Angola) SBG	-	-	-	-	-	2017
⋅	José Kipanda	15	-	-	(Angola) PRI	-	9	-	-	-	-
⋅	Marcelo Motote	-	-	-	(Angola) SBG	-	-	-	-	-	2017
⋅	Márcio Sousa	-	-	-	(Angola) CPL	-	-	-	-	-	2017
⋅	Martin Santos	-	-	-	(Portugal) QUE	-	-	-	-	-	2017
⋅	Michael Ngongo	-	-	-	(Angola) FER	-	-	-	-	-	2017
⋅	Miguel Maconda	16	-	-	(Angola) PET	8	-	-	-	-	-
⋅	Milton Valente	15	SG	1.98	(Angola) PRI	-	-	14	14	-	-
⋅	Pedro Bastos	16	-	-	(Angola) VIL	7	-	-	-	-	-
⋅	Pedro Kavungo	15	-	-	(Angola) PET	9	-	-	-	-	-
⋅	Ramalianes Silva	16	-	-	(Angola) PRI	-	14	-	-	-	-
⋅	Rifen Miguel	16	-	-	(Portugal) BEN	-	-	-	-	13	-
⋅	Rui Monteiro	15	-	-	-	-	8	-	-	-	-
⋅	Selton Miguel	14	-	-	(Portugal) BEN	-	-	-	-	4	-
⋅	Shelson Sanjoaneira	16	-	-	(Angola) VIL	-	-	-	-	5	-
⋅	Sílvio Sousa	15	C	2.03	(Angola) PRI	-	-	6	6	-	-
⋅	Simba Bunga	14	-	-	(Angola) PET	-	5	-	-	-	-
⋅	Tedoyame Simão	-	-	-	(Angola) VIL	-	-	-	-	-	2017
⋅	Teodório Hilário	15	SG	1.93	(Angola) INT	-	-	9	9	-	-
⋅	Tussama Sebastião	-	-	-	(Angola) PET	-	-	-	-	-	2017
⋅	Valdir Manuel	15	C	2.04	(Angola) PET	-	-	-	10	-	-
⋅	Waldir Gonçalves	16	-	-	(Angola) CPL	-	4	-	-	-	-
⋅	Wilson Ambrósio	16	-	-	(Angola) PRI	-	-	-	-	12	-

== Manager history ==
- Ricardo Rodrigues 2017
- Jacinto Olim Jabila 2015
- Manuel Silva Gi 2013, 2014
- Elvino Dias 2011
- Apolinário Paquete 2009

== See also ==
- Angola men's national basketball team
- Angola men's national under-18 and under-19 basketball team
- Angola women's national under-16 and under-17 basketball team
