= Amadou Sissoko =

Central African basketball player

AS Mazanga
- Position: Shooting guard
- League: Central African League

Personal information
- Born: Bangui, Central African Republic

Career history
- 2014–present: AS Mazanga (Central Africa)

Amadou Sissoko is a Central African professional basketball player who currently plays for AS Mazanga of the Central African Division I Basketball League.

== International career ==
Sissoko competed with the Central African Republic national basketball team at the 2009 FIBA Africa Under-16 Championship but failed to medal. In 2011, he participated in Basketball Without Borders, getting the opportunity to work with former players such as Patrick Ewing and Alonzo Mourning. Sissoko was named to the Central African Republic 20-man preliminary squad for the AfroBasket 2015 by head coach Aubin-Thierry Goporo.
