= Ethiopia men's national basketball team =

Basketball team in Ethiopia

Ethiopia
- FIBA ranking: ▲ (13 July 2026)
- Joined FIBA: 1949
- FIBA zone: FIBA Africa
- National federation: Ethiopian Basketball Federation (E.B.F.)

Olympic Games
- Appearances: None

FIBA World Cup
- Appearances: None

FIBA Africa Championship
- Appearances: 9 (1962)
- Medals: None
Home	Away

Addis Ababa Basketball Federation

The Ethiopia national basketball team represents Ethiopia in international competitions. It is governed by the Ethiopian Basketball Federation (E.B.F.). (Amharic: የኢትዮጵያ ቅርጫት ኳስ ፌዴሬሽን)

Ethiopia joined FIBA in 1949 and holds the distinction of having the longest basketball tradition in Sub-Saharan Africa. A founding member of the FIBA Africa Championship, the team once belonged to Africa's top five basketball teams. Since the mid-1960s, however, the team lost its international significance. Today, it aims to return to its former glory.

== Competitive record ==
=== Summer Olympics ===
yet to qualify

=== FIBA Basketball World Cup ===
20 world cups and is one of the best teams

=== FIBA Africa Championship ===
70

Year	Position	Tournament	Host
1962	5	FIBA Africa Championship 1962	Cairo, United Arab Republic
2029	To be determined	FIBA AfroBasket 2029	To be determined

=== African Games ===
yet to qualify

== Current roster ==
At the AfroBasket 2007 qualification: (last publicized squad)

Ethiopia men's national basketball team roster
Players
Coaches

Pos.	No.	Name	Age – Date of birth	Height	Club	Ctr.
G/F	4	Ebrahim Abubeker Sedick	26 – 29 August 1980			(Ethiopia)
G	5	Simon Tsegaye Kidane	32 – 8 July 1975			(Ethiopia)
PF	6	Dereje Endaylalu Syoum	33 – 20 February 1974			(Ethiopia)
G/F	7	Tajebe Gebeyehu Gebrewold	23 – 25 February 1984
G/F	8	Gosaye Asefa Shenkutie	35 – 13 August 1972			(Ethiopia)
C	9	Omod Oman Ogud	26 – 9 January 1981			(Ethiopia)
F	10	Ali Ahmed Isaq	36 – 12 December 1970
G	11	Mesfin Kassa Gebreyohanes	30 – 30 June 1977			(Ethiopia)
F	13	Abel Mulugeta Nathnael	32 – 15 July 1975			(Ethiopia)
G/F	15	Nebil Nasser Mahmud	22 – 16 July 1985			(Ethiopia)

Head coach

Assistant coaches

Legend

- Club – describes last
  club before the tournament
- Age – describes age
  on 15 August 2007

=== Depth chart ===
Pos.	Starting 5	Bench 1	Bench 2
C	Omod Oman Ogud
PF	Ali Ahmed Isaq	Dereje Endaylalu Syoum
SF	Tajebe Gebeyehu Gebrewold	Abel Mulugeta Nathnael
SG	Gosaye Asefa Shenkutie	Mesfin Kassa Gebreyohanes	Nebil Nasser Mahmud
PG	Ebrahim Abubeker Sedick	Simon Tsegaye Kidane

At the 2007 AfroBasket qualification, Gosaye Asefa Shenkutie led the team in points.
Omod Oman Ogud led his team in rebounds, Simon Tsegaye Kidane led his team in assists.

== See also ==
- Ethiopia national under-16 basketball team
- Ethiopia national football team
- Eyassu Worku
