= FIBA Africa Championship 1962 =

Tournament details
- Host country: United Arab Republic
- City: Cairo
- Dates: 24–30 March
- Teams: 5
- Venue: 1 (in 1 host city)

Final positions
- Champions: United Arab Republic (1st title)
- Runners-up: Sudan
- Third place: Morocco
- Fourth place: Guinea

The FIBA Africa Championship 1962 was the first FIBA Africa Championship regional basketball championship held by FIBA Africa. It was held in the United Arab Republic between 24 March and 30 March 1962. Five national teams entered the event under the auspices of FIBA Africa, the sport's regional governing body. The city of Cairo hosted the tournament. The United Arab Republic (Egypt) won the title after finishing in first place of the round robin group.

== Results ==
All five teams competed in a round robin group that defined the final standings.

Team	Pld	W	L	PF	PA	PD	Pts
United Arab Republic	4	4	0	304	139	+165	8
Sudan	4	3	1	198	184	+14	7
Morocco	4	2	2	221	184	+37	6
Guinea	4	1	3	182	213	−31	5
Ethiopia	4	0	4	114	299	−185	4

United Arab Republic	110–20	Ethiopia
Scoring by half: 56–9, 54–11

Morocco	41–44	Sudan
Scoring by half: 20–27, 21–17

Guinea	56–25	Ethiopia
Scoring by half: 27–10, 29–15

United Arab Republic	67–39	Guinea
Scoring by half: 35–15, 32–24

Ethiopia	34–54	Sudan
Scoring by half: 14–27, 20–27

Ethiopia	35–79	Morocco
Scoring by half: 11–52, 24–27

Sudan	58–43	Guinea
Scoring by half: 36–15, 22–28

Sudan	42–66	United Arab Republic
Scoring by half: 22–33, 20–33

Guinea	44–63	Morocco
Scoring by half: 23–19, 38–19

United Arab Republic	61–38	Morocco
Scoring by half: 18–26, 26–37
