= Uganda men's national under-16 basketball team =

Uganda
- FIBA zone: FIBA Africa
- National federation: Federation of Uganda Basketball Association

U17 World Cup
- Appearances: None

U16 AfroBasket
- Appearances: 3
- Medals: None

The Uganda men's national under-16 basketball team is a national basketball team of Uganda, administered by the Federation of Uganda Basketball Association also called FUBA. It represents Uganda in international under-16 men's basketball competitions. It is also called the Junior Silverbacks.

The team is led by the standout players like Kwizera Shane, Kwizera Shammah, Joshua Bwakanda, Evans Shyaka and Pierre Laurent Rwuhiriro.

The Uganda men's national under-16 basketball team competed in the FIBA U16 African Championship in 2023.

== FIBA U16 Afro Basket participation ==
Year	Result
2021	6th
2023	10th
2025	5th

== See also ==
- Uganda men's national basketball team
- Uganda men's national under-18 basketball team
- Uganda women's national under-16 basketball team
