= South Africa men's national under-16 basketball team =

South Africa
- FIBA zone: FIBA Africa
- National federation: Basketball South Africa

U17 World Cup
- Appearances: None

U16 AfroBasket
- Appearances: 3
- Medals: None

The South Africa men's national under-16 basketball team is a national basketball team of South Africa, administered by Basketball South Africa. It represents the country in international under-16 basketball competitions.

== FIBA U16 AfroBasket participations ==
Year	Result
2009	8th
2011	8th
2015	8th

== See also ==
- South Africa men's national basketball team
- South Africa men's national under-18 basketball team
- South Africa women's national under-16 basketball team
