= Equatorial Guinea men's national under-16 basketball team =

Equatorial Guinea
- FIBA zone: FIBA Africa
- National federation: Feguibasket

U17 World Cup
- Appearances: None

U16 AfroBasket
- Appearances: 1 (2015)
- Medals: None

The Equatorial Guinea men's national under-16 basketball team is a national basketball team of Equatorial Guinea, administered by Feguibasket. It represents the country in men's international under-16 basketball competitions.

== FIBA U16 AfroBasket ==
So far, their only participation at the FIBA U16 AfroBasket was the 2015 FIBA Africa Under-16 Championship, where they finished in 10th place.

== See also ==
- Equatorial Guinea men's national basketball team
