= 2025 FIBA U16 AfroBasket =

International youth basketball tournament

9th FIBA Under-16 African Basketball Championship

Tournament details
- Host country: Rwanda
- City: Kigali
- Dates: 2–14 September 2025
- Teams: 12 (from 1 confederation)
- Venues: 2 (in 1 host city)

Final positions
- Champions: Ivory Coast (1st title)
- Runners-up: Cameroon
- Third place: Mali

Official website
- www.fiba.basketball

The 2025 FIBA U16 AfroBasket was the ninth edition of the African basketball championship for under-16 men's national teams. The tournament was played in Kigali, Rwanda, from 2 to 14 September 2025.

This tournament also served as a qualification for the 2026 FIBA Under-17 Basketball World Cup in Turkey, where the top two teams qualified.

== Participating teams ==
- Angola
- Cameroon
- Egypt
- Guinea
- Ivory Coast
- Liberia
- Mali
- Morocco
- Rwanda
- Sierra Leone
- Tunisia
- Uganda

== Group phase ==
All times are local (Central Africa Time; UTC+2).

=== Group A ===
Pos	Team	Pld	W	L	PF	PA	PD	Pts	Qualification
1	Ivory Coast	3	3	0	248	125	+123	6	Quarterfinals
2	Angola	3	2	1	183	157	+26	5	Quarterfinals
3	Rwanda (H)	3	1	2	168	186	−18	4	Quarterfinals
4	Sierra Leone	3	0	3	111	242	−131	3	11th place match

Source: FIBA
(H) Hosts

2 September 2025
19:00

Boxscore

Rwanda	56–67 (OT)	Angola
Scoring by quarter: 18–18, 16–15, 12–12, 10–11, Overtime: 0–11

Petit Stade, Kigali

4 September 2025
18:30

Boxscore

Ivory Coast	112–27	Sierra Leone
Scoring by quarter: 34–2, 35–6, 21–11, 22–8

Petit Stade, Kigali

6 September 2025
16:00

Boxscore

Angola	51–64	Ivory Coast
Scoring by quarter: 10–16, 13–13, 11–17, 17–18

Petit Stade, Kigali

6 September 2025
18:30

Boxscore

Sierra Leone	47–65	Rwanda
Scoring by quarter: 9–10, 11–14, 11–24, 16–17

Petit Stade, Kigali

9 September 2025
13:30

Boxscore

Angola	65–37	Sierra Leone
Scoring by quarter: 17–7, 19–14, 14–10, 15–6

Petit Stade, Kigali

9 September 2025
18:30

Boxscore

Rwanda	47–72	Ivory Coast
Scoring by quarter: 17–24, 14–17, 5–14, 11–17

Petit Stade, Kigali

=== Group B ===
Pos	Team	Pld	W	L	PF	PA	PD	Pts	Qualification
1	Cameroon	3	3	0	205	151	+54	6	Quarterfinals
2	Tunisia	3	2	1	159	150	+9	5	Quarterfinals
3	Uganda	3	1	2	167	161	+6	4	Quarterfinals
4	Guinea	3	0	3	156	225	−69	3	11th place match

Source: FIBA

2 September 2025
16:00

Boxscore

Uganda	50–57	Cameroon
Scoring by quarter: 15–18, 7–17, 16–16, 12–6

Petit Stade, Kigali

3 September 2025
11:00

Boxscore

Guinea	46–64	Tunisia
Scoring by quarter: 13–18, 10–17, 11–16, 12–13

Petit Stade, Kigali

5 September 2025
16:00

Boxscore

Tunisia	51–44	Uganda
Scoring by quarter: 9–10, 16–10, 18–13, 8–11

Petit Stade, Kigali

5 September 2025
18:30

Boxscore

Cameroon	88–57	Guinea
Scoring by quarter: 22–13, 11–17, 31–18, 24–9

Petit Stade, Kigali

8 September 2025
16:00

Boxscore

Guinea	53–73	Uganda
Scoring by quarter: 18–11, 11–14, 15–21, 9–27

Petit Stade, Kigali

8 September 2025
18:30

Boxscore

Tunisia	44–60	Cameroon
Scoring by quarter: 14–11, 2–13, 17–17, 11–19

Petit Stade, Kigali

=== Group C ===
Pos	Team	Pld	W	L	PF	PA	PD	Pts	Qualification
1	Mali	3	3	0	203	173	+30	6	Quarterfinals
2	Egypt	3	2	1	213	195	+18	5	Quarterfinals
3	Liberia	3	1	2	192	212	−20	4	9th place match
4	Morocco	3	0	3	190	218	−28	3	9th place match

Source: FIBA

3 September 2025
16:00

Boxscore

Egypt	77–67	Morocco
Scoring by quarter: 17–16, 14–15, 24–14, 22–22

Petit Stade, Kigali

4 September 2025
13:30

Boxscore

Mali	69–57	Liberia
Scoring by quarter: 20–14, 24–14, 14–9, 11–20

Petit Stade, Kigali

7 September 2025
11:00

Boxscore

Liberia	61–74	Egypt
Scoring by quarter: 13–16, 9–13, 18–20, 21–25

Petit Stade, Kigali

7 September 2025
18:30

Boxscore

Morocco	54–67	Mali
Scoring by quarter: 10–16, 10–16, 23–18, 11–17

Petit Stade, Kigali

10 September 2025
11:00

Boxscore

Morocco	69–74	Liberia
Scoring by quarter: 10–17, 21–18, 17–19, 21–20

Petit Stade, Kigali

10 September 2025
18:30

Boxscore

Egypt	62–67	Mali
Scoring by quarter: 11–12, 14–11, 19–20, 18–24

Petit Stade, Kigali

== Playoff brackets ==
Quarterfinals
12 September
1 Ivory Coast	97
8 Rwanda	38
12 September
4 Angola	51
5 Egypt	69
12 September
2 Cameroon	53
7 Uganda	50
12 September
3 Mali	73
6 Tunisia	70

Semifinals
13 September
Ivory Coast	75
Egypt	58
13 September
Cameroon	61
Mali	56

Final
14 September
Ivory Coast	62
Cameroon	49
3rd place match
14 September
Egypt	51
Mali	58

7th place match
13 September
Rwanda	55
Angola	79

5th place match
13 September
Uganda	66
Tunisia	55

11th place match
11 September
Guinea	66
Sierra Leone	36

9th place match
11 September
Liberia	79
Morocco	80

== Playoff results ==
=== 9th–12th place classification ===
==== 11th place match ====
11 September 2025
13:30

Boxscore

Guinea	66–36	Sierra Leone
Scoring by quarter: 13–10, 19–11, 22–8, 12–7

LDK Gymnasium, Kigali

==== 9th place match ====
11 September 2025
16:00

Boxscore

Liberia	79–80	Morocco
Scoring by quarter: 17–20, 24–20, 21–19, 17–21

LDK Gymnasium, Kigali

=== Quarterfinals ===
12 September 2025
11:00

Boxscore

Cameroon	53–50	Uganda
Scoring by quarter: 17–14, 13–6, 11–16, 12–14

Petit Stade, Kigali

12 September 2025
13:30

Boxscore

Angola	51–69	Egypt
Scoring by quarter: 14–22, 18–15, 8–21, 11–11

Petit Stade, Kigali

12 September 2025
16:00

Boxscore

Mali	73–70	Tunisia
Scoring by quarter: 25–22, 20–14, 18–11, 10–23

Petit Stade, Kigali

12 September 2025
18:30

Boxscore

Ivory Coast	97–38	Rwanda
Scoring by quarter: 19–12, 29–7, 18–9, 31–10

Petit Stade, Kigali

==== 7th place match ====
13 September 2025
13:30

Boxscore

Rwanda	55–79	Angola
Scoring by quarter: 17–18, 10–14, 17–26, 11–21

LDK Gymnasium, Kigali

==== 5th place match ====
13 September 2025
16:00

Boxscore

Uganda	66–55	Tunisia
Scoring by quarter: 9–8, 22–11, 16–15, 19–21

LDK Gymnasium, Kigali

=== Semifinals ===
13 September 2025
16:00

Boxscore

Ivory Coast	75–58	Egypt
Scoring by quarter: 23–15, 21–16, 17–14, 14–13

Petit Stade, Kigali

13 September 2025
18:30

Boxscore

Cameroon	61–56	Mali
Scoring by quarter: 22–8, 11–21, 7–9, 21–18

Petit Stade, Kigali

==== 3rd place match ====
14 September 2025
13:30

Boxscore

Egypt	51–58	Mali
Scoring by quarter: 11–12, 12–17, 18–11, 10–18
Pts: Ammar 16; Rebs: Guirguis 8 Asts: Bekhit 3		Pts: Ballo, Maiga 10; Rebs: Keita 13; Asts: Keita 7

Petit Stade, Kigali
Attendance: 123
Referees: Francisco Tando (ANG), Peter Omwenga Ontita (KEN), Michel Djeugoue (CMR)

==== Final ====
14 September 2025
19:00

Boxscore

Ivory Coast	62–49	Cameroon
Scoring by quarter: 15–12, 8–9, 15–9, 24–19
Pts: Oka 18; Rebs: Ouédraogo 20; Asts: Yapo, Mangassouba 3		Pts: Ngangmeni 13; Rebs: Ngoumou 11; Asts: three players 2

Petit Stade, Kigali
Attendance: 990
Referees: Imad Driouach (MAR), António Sitoe (MOZ), Ahmed Chiwa (TUN)

== Final standings ==
Rank	Team
1st place, gold medalist(s)	Ivory Coast
2nd place, silver medalist(s)	Cameroon
3rd place, bronze medalist(s)	Mali
4	Egypt
5	Uganda
6	Tunisia
7	Angola
8	Rwanda
9	Morocco
10	Liberia
11	Guinea
12	Sierra Leone

Qualified for the 2026 FIBA Under-17 Basketball World Cup
