= Republic of the Congo men's national under-16 basketball team =

Republic of the Congo
- FIBA zone: FIBA Africa
- National federation: Fédération Congolaise de Basketball

U17 World Cup
- Appearances: None

U16 AfroBasket
- Appearances: 1 (2011)
- Medals: None

The Republic of the Congo men's national under-16 basketball team is a national basketball team of the Republic of the Congo, administered by the Fédération Congolaise de Basketball. It represents the country in men's international under-16 basketball competitions.

== FIBA U16 AfroBasket ==
So far, their only participation at the FIBA U16 AfroBasket was the 2011 FIBA Africa Under-16 Championship, where they finished in 7th place.

== See also ==
- Republic of the Congo men's national basketball team
- Republic of the Congo men's national under-18 basketball team
