= Rwanda men's national under-16 basketball team =

Rwanda
- FIBA zone: FIBA Africa
- National federation: Fédération Rwandaise de Basketball Amateur

U17 World Cup
- Appearances: None

U16 AfroBasket
- Appearances: 5
- Medals: None

The Rwanda men's national under-16 basketball team is a national basketball team of Rwanda, administered by the Fédération Rwandaise de Basketball Amateur. It represents the country in international under-16 men's basketball competitions.

== FIBA U16 AfroBasket participations ==
Year	Result
2015	9th
2017	6th
2019	5th
2023	5th
2025	8th

== See also ==
- Rwanda men's national basketball team
- Rwanda men's national under-18 basketball team
- Rwanda women's national under-16 basketball team
