= 2023 FIBA U16 African Championship =

International youth basketball tournament

2023 FIBA U16 AfroBasket
8th FIBA Under-16 African Basketball Championship

Tournament details
- Host country: Tunisia
- City: Monastir, Jemmal
- Dates: 13–23 July
- Teams: 10 (from 1 confederation)
- Venue(s): 2 (in 2 host cities)

Final positions
- Champions: Guinea (1st title)
- Runners-up: Egypt
- Third place: Mali

Tournament statistics
- MVP: (Guinea) Nour Gassim Toure
- Top scorer: (Uganda) Rugette 26.6
- Top rebounds: (Guinea) Diane 17.3
- Top assists: (Guinea) Toure 8.1
- PPG (Team): Guinea (88.7)
- RPG (Team): Guinea (65.9)
- APG (Team): Egypt (26.6)

Official website
- www.fiba.basketball/history

The 2023 FIBA U16 African Championship was an international basketball competition held in Monastir and Jemmal, Tunisia from 13 to 23 July 2023. It served as a qualifier for the 2024 FIBA Under-17 Basketball World Cup in Turkey.

== Venues ==
| Monastir | 2023 FIBA U16 African Championship is located in Tunisia | Jemmal |
| Mohamed-Mzali Sports Hall (Capacity: 5000) | 2023 FIBA U16 African Championship is located in Tunisia | Salle des Sports Jammel (Capacity: 2000) |

== Participating teams ==
- Angola
- Chad
- Egypt
- Guinea
- Ivory Coast
- Mali
- Morocco
- Rwanda
- Tunisia
- Uganda

== Group phase ==
All times are local (Central European Time – UTC+1).

=== Group A ===
| Pos | Team | Pld | W | L | PF | PA | PD | Pts | Qualification |
|---|---|---|---|---|---|---|---|---|---|
| 1 | Mali | 4 | 4 | 0 | 292 | 206 | +86 | 8 | Quarterfinals |
| 2 | Angola | 4 | 3 | 1 | 229 | 229 | 0 | 7 | Quarterfinals |
| 3 | Rwanda | 4 | 2 | 2 | 283 | 264 | +19 | 6 | Quarterfinals |
| 4 | Ivory Coast | 4 | 1 | 3 | 266 | 292 | −26 | 5 | Quarterfinals |
| 5 | Tunisia (H) | 4 | 0 | 4 | 214 | 293 | −79 | 4 | 9th place match |

Source: FIBA
(H) Hosts

13 July 2023
13:00

Boxscore

| Mali | 72–49 | Ivory Coast |
Scoring by quarter: 25-13, 18–11, 9-16, 20-9

Mohamed-Mzali Sports Hall

13 July 2023
18:30

Boxscore

| Tunisia | 59–78 | Rwanda |
Scoring by quarter: 10-21, 9–19, 23-16, 17-22

Mohamed-Mzali Sports Hall

14 July 2023
13:00

Boxscore

| Rwanda | 72–76 | Mali |
Scoring by quarter: 12-17, 19-20, 16-20, 25-19

Mohamed-Mzali Sports Hall

14 July 2023
18:00

Boxscore

| Ivory Coast | 58–78 | Angola |
Scoring by quarter: 13-20, 17-25, 20-18, 8-15

Mohamed-Mzali Sports Hall

15 July 2023
15:30

Boxscore

| Angola | 43–67 | Mali |
Scoring by quarter: 11-22, 10-15, 5-21, 17-9

Mohamed-Mzali Sports Hall

15 July 2023
18:00

Boxscore

| Ivory Coast | 90–68 | Tunisia |
Scoring by quarter: 19-25, 24-12, 24-15, 23-16

Mohamed-Mzali Sports Hall

16 July 2023
13:00

Boxscore

| Rwanda | 74–69 | Ivory Coast |
Scoring by quarter: 15-15, 14-15, 21-8, 24-31

Mohamed-Mzali Sports Hall

16 July 2023
18:00

Boxscore

| Tunisia | 45–48 | Angola |
Scoring by quarter: 10-14, 12-4, 17-12, 6-18

Mohamed-Mzali Sports Hall

17 July 2023
13:00

Boxscore

| Angola | 60–59 | Rwanda |
Scoring by quarter: 18-9, 15-17, 19-18, 8-15

Mohamed-Mzali Sports Hall

17 July 2023
18:00

Boxscore

| Mali | 77–42 | Tunisia |
Scoring by quarter: 25-16, 22-8, 17-9, 13-9

Mohamed-Mzali Sports Hall

=== Group B ===
| Pos | Team | Pld | W | L | PF | PA | PD | Pts | Qualification |
|---|---|---|---|---|---|---|---|---|---|
| 1 | Guinea | 4 | 4 | 0 | 360 | 256 | +104 | 8 | Quarterfinals |
| 2 | Egypt | 4 | 3 | 1 | 377 | 280 | +97 | 7 | Quarterfinals |
| 3 | Chad | 4 | 1 | 3 | 311 | 325 | −14 | 5 | Quarterfinals |
| 4 | Morocco | 4 | 1 | 3 | 311 | 366 | −55 | 5 | Quarterfinals |
| 5 | Uganda | 4 | 1 | 3 | 255 | 387 | −132 | 5 | 9th place match |

Source: FIBA

13 July 2023
15:30

Boxscore

| Egypt | 100–79 | Morocco |
Scoring by quarter: 26-24, 28–11, 23-15, 23-29

Mohamed-Mzali Sports Hall

14 July 2023
10:30

Boxscore

| Morocco | 62–95 | Guinea |
Scoring by quarter: 14-21, 13-21, 22-27, 13-26

Mohamed-Mzali Sports Hall

15 July 2023
10:30

Boxscore

| Chad | 91–70 | Uganda |
Scoring by quarter: 26-26, 22-13, 16-19, 27-12

Mohamed-Mzali Sports Hall

15 July 2023
13:00

Boxscore

| Egypt | 78–83 | Guinea |
Scoring by quarter: 22-17, 16-23, 20-22, 20-21

Mohamed-Mzali Sports Hall

16 July 2023
10:30

Boxscore

| Uganda | 48–116 | Egypt |
Scoring by quarter: 11-28, 15-25, 12-30, 10-33

Mohamed-Mzali Sports Hall

16 July 2023
15:30

Boxscore

| Morocco | 90–86 | Chad |
Scoring by quarter: 23-23, 18-18, 24-26, 25-19

Mohamed-Mzali Sports Hall

17 July 2023
10:30

Boxscore

| Guinea | 82–64 | Chad |
Scoring by quarter: 27-15, 21-22, 12-21, 22-6

Mohamed-Mzali Sports Hall

17 July 2023
15:30

Boxscore

| Uganda | 85–80 | Morocco |
Scoring by quarter: 20-21, 21-14, 20-28, 24-17

Mohamed-Mzali Sports Hall

18 July 2023
13:00

Boxscore

| Chad | 70–83 | Egypt |
Scoring by quarter: 20-21, 9-16, 18-25, 27-27

Mohamed-Mzali Sports Hall

18 July 2023
15:30

Boxscore

| Guinea | 100–52 | Uganda |
Scoring by quarter: 25-10, 19-7, 28-19, 28-16

Mohamed-Mzali Sports Hall

== Knockout phase ==
Main bracket

Quarterfinals
19 July
Morocco | 74
Mali | 76
20 July
Rwanda | 78
Egypt | 94
19 July
Ivory Coast | 43
Guinea | 106
20 July
Chad | 74
Angola | 86

Semifinals
22 July
Mali | 58
Egypt | 66
22 July
Guinea | 71
Angola | 61

Final
23 July
Egypt | 76
Guinea | 84
3rd place match
23 July
Mali | 63
Angola | 56

5th place bracket

5th–8th place semifinals
21 July
Morocco | 76
Rwanda | 77
21 July
Ivory Coast | 85
Chad | 71

5th place match
23 July
Rwanda | 74
Ivory Coast | 62
7th place match
23 July
Morocco | 74
Chad | 75

=== Quarterfinals ===
19 July 2023
15:30

Boxscore

| Morocco | 74–76 | Mali |
Scoring by quarter: 21-19, 19-18, 17-27, 17-12

Mohamed-Mzali Sports Hall

19 July 2023
18:00

Boxscore

| Ivory Coast | 43–106 | Guinea |
Scoring by quarter: 15-28, 16-31, 5-25, 7-22

Mohamed-Mzali Sports Hall

20 July 2023
15:30

Boxscore

| Chad | 74–86 | Angola |
Scoring by quarter: 14-21, 21-19, 19-27, 19-19

Mohamed-Mzali Sports Hall

20 July 2023
18:00

Boxscore

| Rwanda | 78–94 | Egypt |
Scoring by quarter: 20-20, 12-27, 24-21, 20-26

Mohamed-Mzali Sports Hall

=== 9th place match ===
20 July 2023
13:00

Boxscore

| Tunisia | 68–65 | Uganda |
Scoring by quarter: 19-12, 14-20, 16-20, 19-13

Salle des Sports Jammel

=== 5th–8th place semifinals ===
21 July 2023
13:00

Boxscore

| Ivory Coast | 85–71 | Chad |
Scoring by quarter: 16-17, 9-18, 30-18, 30-18

Salle des Sports Jammel

21 July 2023
15:30

Boxscore

| Morocco | 76–77 | Rwanda |
Scoring by quarter: 24-18, 9-15, 20-19, 23-25

Salle des Sports Jammel

=== Semifinals ===
22 July 2023
10:30

Boxscore

| Guinea | 71–61 | Angola |
Scoring by quarter: 15-18, 23-20, 18-16, 15-7

Mohamed-Mzali Sports Hall

22 July 2023
13:00

Boxscore

| Mali | 58–66 | Egypt |
Scoring by quarter: 11-17, 14-12, 18-19, 15-18

Mohamed-Mzali Sports Hall

=== 7th place match ===
23 July 2023
10:30

Boxscore

| Morocco | 74–75 | Chad |
Scoring by quarter: 12-21, 14-18, 20-19, 28-17

Mohamed-Mzali Sports Hall

=== 5th place match ===
23 July 2023
13:00

Boxscore

| Rwanda | 74–62 | Ivory Coast |
Scoring by quarter: 14-18, 25-14, 14-18, 31-12

Mohamed-Mzali Sports Hall

=== 3rd place match ===
23 July 2023
15:30

Boxscore

| Mali | 63–56 | Angola |
Scoring by quarter: 14-10, 21-11, 19-20, 9-15

Mohamed-Mzali Sports Hall

=== Final ===
23 July 2023
18:00

Boxscore

| Egypt | 76–84 | Guinea |
Scoring by quarter: 20-21, 28-23, 17-10, 11-30

Mohamed-Mzali Sports Hall

== Awards ==
2023 FIBA Africa Under-16 Championship winners

Guinea
First title

Most Valuable Players
(Guinea) Nour Gassim Toure

== Final standings ==
| Rank | Team | Record | Points | | |
| Rank | Team | Record | For | Against | Diff. |
|---|---|---|---|---|---|
| 1st place, gold medalist(s) | Guinea | 7-0 | 621 | 436 | +40 |
| 2nd place, silver medalist(s) | Egypt | 5-2 | 613 | 500 | +44 |
| 3rd place, bronze medalist(s) | Mali | 6-1 | 489 | 402 | -48 |
| 4 | Angola | 4-3 | 432 | 437 | -52 |
| 5 | Rwanda | 4-3 | 512 | 496 | -55 |
| 6 | Ivory Coast | 2-5 | 456 | 543 | -58 |
| 7 | Chad | 2-5 | 531 | 570 | -62 |
| 8 | Morocco | 1-6 | 535 | 593 | -68 |
| 9 | Tunisia | 1-4 | 282 | 358 | -76 |
| 10 | Uganda | 1-4 | 268 | 355 | -87 |

| Qualified for the 2024 FIBA Under-17 Basketball World Cup |
