= 2011 FIBA Africa Under-16 Championship =

Men's basketball tournament

2011 FIBA U16 AfroBasket
2nd FIBA Under-16 African Basketball Championship

Tournament details
- Host country: Egypt
- Dates: July 8–16
- Teams: 8
- Venue: 1 (in 1 host city)

Final positions
- Champions: Egypt (2nd title)

Tournament statistics
- MVP: (Egypt) Ehab Amin
- Top scorer: (South Africa) Williams 23
- Top rebounds: (Mozambique) Ubisse 11.3
- Top assists: (Egypt) Abdeen 6
- PPG (Team): Egypt (101)
- RPG (Team): Egypt (46.3)
- APG (Team): Egypt (21.7)

Official website
- 2011 FIBA Africa U16 Championship

The 2011 FIBA Africa Under-16 Championship for Men (alternatively the Afrobasket U16) was the 2nd U-16 FIBA Africa championship, played under the auspices of the Fédération Internationale de Basketball, the basketball sport governing body and qualified for the 2012 World Cup. The tournament was held from July 8–16 in Alexandria, Egypt, contested by 8 national teams and won by Egypt.

The tournament qualified the winner for the 2012 U17 World Championship.

== Format ==
- The 8 teams were divided into two groups (Groups A+B) for the preliminary round.
- Round robin for the preliminary round.
- From there on a knockout system was used until the final.

=== Draw ===
Group A	Group B
Egypt; Mozambique; Algeria; South Africa	Tunisia; Angola; Mali; Congo

== Preliminary round ==
Times given below are in UTC+2.

=== Group A ===
Qualified for the semi-finals

Team	Pld	W	L	PF	PA	PD	Pts
Egypt	3	3	0	303	168	+135	6
Mozambique	3	1	2	181	232	-51	4
Algeria	3	1	2	142	163	-21	4
South Africa	3	1	2	116	179	-63	3

8 July 2011
18:00

Boxscore

Egypt	108–54	Mozambique
Scoring by quarter: 33-15, 19-16, 24-10, 32-13
Pts: Amin 32; Rebs: Osama 6 Asts: Abdeen 7		Pts: Ubisse 22; Rebs: Martins 5 Asts: Chambal 2

Alexandria

9 July 2011

South Africa	0–20	Algeria
Scoring by quarter: n/a
Pts: n/a Rebs: n/a Asts: n/a		Pts: n/a Rebs: n/a Asts: n/a

Alexandria

11 July 2011
14:00

Boxscore

Mozambique	58–59	South Africa
Scoring by quarter: 20-17, 13-12, 12-12, 13-18
Pts: Ubisse 25; Rebs: Ubisse 18; Asts: Bunguele 4		Pts: Williams 30; Rebs: Bilankulu 12; Asts: Mani 5

Alexandria

11 July 2011
18:00

Boxscore

Egypt	94–57	Algeria
Scoring by quarter: 18-15, 28-8, 24-17, 24-17
Pts: Emad 13; Rebs: Hosny 9 Asts: Amin 7		Pts: Boutiba 19; Rebs: Soualah 8 Asts: Boutiba 2

Alexandria

12 July 2011
18:00

Boxscore

South Africa	57–101	Egypt
Scoring by quarter: 12-20, 17-25, 15-23, 13-33
Pts: Paton 18; Rebs: Williams 11; Asts: Mani 2		Pts: Emad 14; Rebs: Emad 9 Asts: Aly 9

Alexandria

12 July 2011
20:00

Boxscore

Algeria	65–69	Mozambique
Scoring by quarter: 13-23, 16-15, 19-12, 17-19
Pts: Boutiba 23; Rebs: Aissa 8 Asts: Nehal 2		Pts: Ubisse 21; Rebs: Ubisse 11; Asts: Francisco 3

Alexandria

=== Group B ===
Qualified for the semi-finals

Team	Pld	W	L	PF	PA	PD	Pts
Tunisia	3	3	0	137	111	+26	6
Angola	3	2	1	137	115	+22	5
Mali	3	1	2	122	116	+6	3
Congo	3	0	3	94	148	-54	2

9 July 2011

Tunisia	20–0	Congo

Alexandria

Angola	20–0	Mali

Alexandria

11 July 2011

Mali	71–43	Congo

Alexandria

Angola	60–64	Tunisia

Alexandria

12 July 2011

Tunisia	53–51	Mali

Alexandria

Congo	51–57	Angola

Alexandria

== Knockout stage ==
All matches were played in: Alexandria

Quarter-finals
15 July
Congo	33
Egypt	128
15 July
Algeria	56
Angola	62
15 July
South Africa	38
Tunisia	80
15 July
Mali	47
Mozambique	44

Semi-finals
16 July
Egypt	106
Angola	41
16 July
Tunisia	51
Mali	49

Final
16 July
Egypt	117
Tunisia	67
Third place
16 July
Angola	57
Mali	59

5th place bracket

Semi-finals
16 July
Congo	50
Algeria	68
16 July
South Africa	61
Mozambique	69

Fifth place
16 July
Algeria	55
Mozambique	54
Seventh place
16 July
Congo	66
South Africa	60

=== Quarterfinals ===
15 July 2011

Congo	33–128	Egypt

Alexandria

Algeria	56–62	Angola

Alexandria

South Africa	38–80	Tunisia

Alexandria

Mali	47–44	Mozambique

Alexandria

=== Classification 5–8 ===
16 July 2011

Congo	50–68	Algeria

Alexandria

South Africa	61–69	Mozambique

Alexandria

=== Semifinals ===
16 July 2011

Egypt	106–41	Angola

Alexandria

Tunisia	51–49	Mali

Alexandria

=== Seventh place game ===
16 July 2011

Congo	66–60	South Africa

Alexandria

=== Fifth place game ===
16 July 2011

Algeria	55–54	Mozambique

Alexandria

=== Bronze medal game ===
16 July 2011

Angola	57–59	Mali

Alexandria

=== Gold medal game ===
16 July 2011

Egypt	117–67	Tunisia

Alexandria

== Final standings ==
Qualified for the 2012 U17 World Championship

Rank	Team	Record
Gold medal	Egypt	6–1
Silver medal	Tunisia	6–1
Bronze medal	Mali	5–1
4.	Angola	3–3
5.	Algeria	4–3
6.	Mozambique	2–5
7.	Congo	1–5
8.	South Africa	1–5

Egypt roster
Ahmed Elsayed, Ahmed Elmoslly, Ahmed Soliman, Amr Nabil, Anas Mahmoud, Ehab Amin, Moataz Hosny, Omar Abdeen, Omar Elmanestrly, Walid Aly, Wessam Emad, Ziad Nabil, Coach: Youssef Rafik

== Awards ==
2011 FIBA Africa Under-16 Championship winner

Egypt
Second title

Most Valuable Player
(Egypt) Ehab Amin

All-Tournament Team

- (Egypt) G Ehab Amin MVP
- (Egypt) PG Omar Abdeen
- (Tunisia) F Ahmed Boutiba
- (Egypt) PF Wessam Emad
- (Mozambique) C Helton Ubisse

== See also ==
- 2012 FIBA Africa Under-18 Championship
