= Makan Kéita =

Malian footballer

Personal information
- Date of birth: 16 December 1972 (age 53)
- Place of birth: Bolibana, Mali
- Position: Midfielder

International career
Years	Team	Apps	(Gls)
1993	Mali	2	(1)

Makan Kéita (born 16 December 1972) is a Malian footballer. He played in two matches for the Mali national football team in 1993. He was also named in Mali's squad for the 1994 African Cup of Nations tournament.
