= Boubacar Moungoro =

Malian professional basketball player (born 1994)

Free agent
- Position: Shooting guard / small forward

Personal information
- Born: September 22, 1994 (age 32) Bamako, Mali
- Listed height: 6 ft 6 in (1.98 m)
- Listed weight: 190 lb (86 kg)

Career information
- High school: IMG Academy (Bradenton, Florida)
- NBA draft: 2014: undrafted
- Playing career: 2013–present

Career history
- 2013–2015: Baloncesto Fuenlabrada
- 2013–2015: → Viten Getafe
- 2015–2017: Oklahoma City Blue
Medals
Men's basketball
Representing Mali
FIBA Africa Under-16 Championship
Silver medal – second place	2009 Maputo	Mali

Boubacar Moungoro (born September 22, 1994) is a Malian professional basketball player. He declared for the 2014 NBA draft after averaging 8.0 points and 2.5 rebounds with Baloncesto Fuenlabrada.

== Professional career ==
Moungoro forwent college after completing his high school career with IMG Academy in Bradenton, Florida. The Bamako native is currently represented by agent Travis King, who has also worked with Robert Covington, and Amar'e Stoudemire in the past. Moungoro has also played for the youth teams of the Mali national basketball team in the past, logging an average of 26 minutes in the 2013 Nike Global Challenge. On November 3, he was acquired by the Oklahoma City Blue after a successful tryout.

== Mali national team ==
In February 2015, it was announced that Moungoro would join the Mali national team at play in the 2015 FIBA Africa Championship qualification against Senegal. In the first game, won by Mali by 65–43, Moungoro scored 12 points and retrieved five rebounds, while in the second leg he scored seven points in the win abroad of his team by 50–47.
