= Morocco men's national under-16 basketball team =

Morocco
- FIBA zone: FIBA Africa
- National federation: Fédération Royale Marocaine de Basket-Ball

U17 World Cup
- Appearances: None

U16 AfroBasket
- Appearances: 3
- Medals: None

The Morocco men's national under-16 basketball team is a national basketball team of Morocco, administered by the Fédération Royale Marocaine de Basket-Ball. It represents the country in international under-16 men's basketball competitions.

== FIBA U16 AfroBasket participations ==
Year	Result
2015	6th
2023	8th
2025	9th

== See also ==
- Morocco men's national basketball team
- Morocco men's national under-18 basketball team
- Morocco women's national under-16 basketball team
