= Justin Paton =

New Zealand writer, art critic and curator

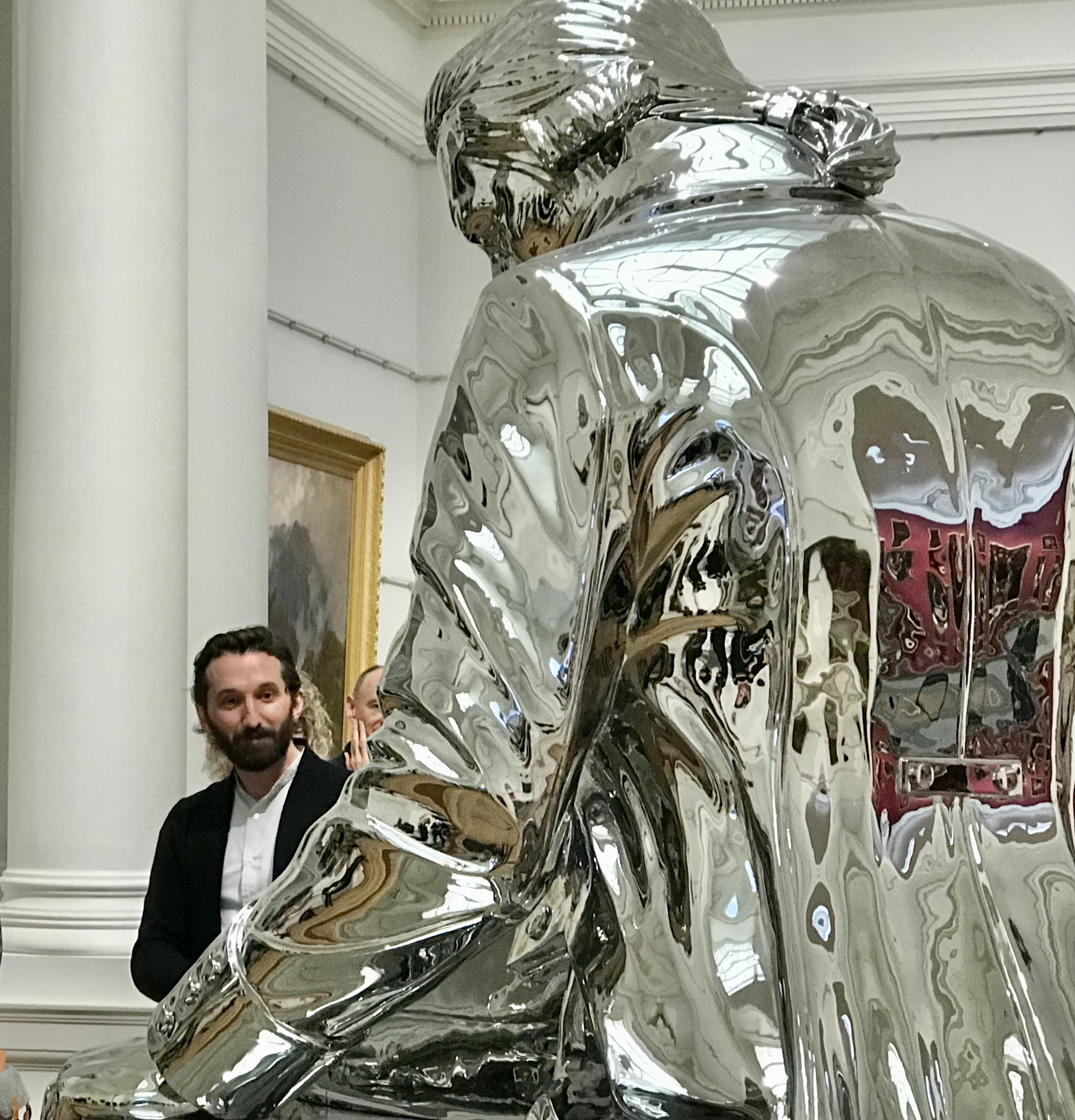
- Justin Paton with Michael Parekowhai’s sculpture 'The English Channel' at the Art Gallery of New South Wales, 2018
- Born: 1972 (age 53–54)
- Education: University of Canterbury
- Occupations: Writer; art critic; curator
- Writing career
- Notable work: How to Look at a Painting (2005)
- Notable awards: Montana New Zealand Book Award for Contemporary Culture 2005; Katherine Mansfield Menton Fellowship 2012

Justin Paton (born 1972) is a New Zealand writer, art critic and curator, currently based in Sydney, Australia. His book How to Look at a Painting (2005) was adapted into a 12-episode television series by TVNZ in 2011.

== Education ==
Paton studied art history and English at the University of Canterbury in Christchurch, New Zealand.

== Arts writer ==
After university, Paton worked as an art critic for New Zealand newspaper The Press. He was the editor of New Zealand's oldest literary journal, Landfall, from 2000 until 2005.

Paton's book How to Look at a Painting was published in 2005. It was critically well-received, being selected as the Best Art Book of 2005 by both the New Zealand Listener and The Press, and won the Montana New Zealand Book Award for Contemporary Culture.

How to Look at a Painting was adapted into a 12-episode television series by TVNZ, which aired in 2011. Paton presented the show. Kim Knight, reviewing the show for the Sunday Star Times, noted that "among the many things Paton does brilliantly is make art accessible to everyone". Christopher Moore at The Press said Paton is "one of those rare individuals in the art world who can bring an artwork to life, inspiring you to plunge into the artist's imagination; to burrow beneath the surface of the canvas, paper and paint to see what lies beneath".

Paton has also written extensively about artists, including a book about Australian sculptor Ricky Swallow in 2004, and essays about New Zealand painter Kushana Bush, Argentinian sculptor Adrián Villar Rojas, New Zealand artist Ronnie van Hout, and Australian painter Ben Quilty.

In 2012, Paton was the recipient of one of New Zealand's most prestigious literary awards, the Katherine Mansfield Menton Fellowship. He spent over six months living and working in Menton, France, where Katherine Mansfield lived and worked for part of her life. In the same year, his book De-Building was the winner of the Judges' Special Award at the 2012 Museums Australia Multimedia & Publication Design Awards, and was shortlisted for the Mary Egan Award for Best Typography at the Publishers' Association of NZ (PANZ) Book Awards 2012.

In 2019 he published McCahon Country, about the works of famous New Zealand painter Colin McCahon, marking the centenary of McCahon's birth. It was long-listed for the Illustrated Non-fiction Award in the 2020 Ockham New Zealand Book Awards.

== Curator ==
In 1996–1997, Paton was the guest curator of The Harmony of Opposites, a major touring exhibition of the work of New Zealand artist Don Peebles, led by the Robert McDougall Art Gallery. He wrote the text that accompanied the exhibition.

Paton was the curator of contemporary art at the Dunedin Public Art Gallery between 1999 and 2009. In 2009 he was appointed as the Senior Curator of the Christchurch Art Gallery. Paton was the curator of New Zealand's official presentation by Bill Culbert at the 2013 Venice Biennale.

In 2014, Paton moved to Sydney to become the Head Curator of International Art at the Art Gallery of New South Wales.

== Selected works ==
- Ricky Swallow: Field recordings (2004)
- How to Look at a Painting (2005)
- De-Building (2012)
- McCahon Country (2019)
