= Selton Miguel =

Angolan basketball player

No. 1 – Tauron GTK Gliwice
- Position: Shooting guard
- League: PLK

Personal information
- Born: 24 October 2000 (age 26) Luanda, Angola
- Listed height: 6 ft 4 in (1.93 m)
- Listed weight: 217 lb (98 kg)

Career information
- High school: West Oaks Academy (Orlando, Florida)
- College: Kansas State (2020–2022); South Florida (2022–2024); Maryland (2024–2025)
- NBA draft: 2025: undrafted
- Playing career: 2025–present

Career history
- 2025: South Bay Lakers
- 2025–2026: Nevėžis Kėdainiai
- 2026–present: GTK Gliwice

Career highlights
- Second-team All-AAC (2024); AAC Sixth Man of the Year (2024)
Medals
Men's basketball
Representing Angola
AfroBasket
Gold medal – first place	2025 Angola

Selton Ricardo Fernandes Miguel Jr. (born 24 October 2000) is an Angolan basketball player for GTK Gliwice of the Polish Basketball League (PLK). He played college basketball for the Kansas State Wildcats, South Florida Bulls, and Maryland Terrapins. Internationally, he represents the Angola national team, winning gold at FIBA AfroBasket 2025.

== Early life and high school career ==
Miguel was born in Luanda to a Henriques and Suzana Miguel. His guardian is Barry Myers, and he has three siblings, including his brother Rifen, who played for the Troy Trojans.

Miguel was born in Luanda, Angola, where he began playing soccer but switched to basketball at the suggestion of his father. At age 13 he moved before he and his older brother moved to Portugal to attend a military academy. In Portugal, Miguel played basketball and gathere attention, which led to his move to the United States. He attended West Oaks Academy in Orlando, Florida, where he scored over 1,500 points. As a senior (2019–20), he averaged 20.6 points per game and was named SIAA MVP and a Ballislife Second Team All-American, despite a thumb injury late in the season.

== College career ==
At Kansas State, Miguel appeared in all 29 games (22 starts) as a freshman, averaging 7.2 ppg. He hit a game-winning three-pointer against the Omaha Mavericks. In 2021–22, he matched his career-high of 17 points versus the McNeese State Cowboys and posted his first double-double (12 pts, 10 rebs) against the UAlbany Great Danes.

Miguel transferred to the South Florida Bulls, where he averaged 10.3 ppg in 2022–23, including 23 points against the NJIT Highlanders. In 2023–24, he averaged 14.7 ppg as sixth man, scoring 23 points against the tenth-ranked Memphis Tigers and 25 versus the #24 FAU Owls. He was named AAC Sixth Man of the Year, Most Improved Player, and All-AAC Second Team.

Miguel's final season was with the Maryland Terrapins, where he averaged 11.6 ppg, 3.0 rpg, and made 75 three-pointers (7th-most in school history). He scored 24 points against the Saint Francis Red Flash and was named Barclays Center Classic MVP and received the Big Ten Sportsmanship Award.

== Professional career ==
After college, Miguel joined the Utah Jazz for the 2025 NBA Summer League as an undrafted free agent. He then joined the South Bay Lakers of the NBA G League.

On 6 December 2025, Miguel signed with Nevėžis Kėdainiai of the Lithuanian Basketball League (LKL).

On August 17, 2026, he signed with GTK Gliwice of the Polish Basketball League (PLK).

== National team career ==
Miguel also represented Angola at youth level in FIBA-sanctioned tournaments. He competed in the 2015 FIBA Africa U16 Championship, appearing in 7 games and averaging 2.7 points, 1.4 rebounds, and 1.6 assists per game. He later took part in the 2017 FIBA U19 Basketball World Cup, playing 7 games and averaging 2.3 points, 0.9 rebounds, and 0.7 assists per game.

Miguel starred for Angola at FIBA AfroBasket 2025, averaging 10.7 ppg, 2.5 rpg, and 1.3 apg. In the final against Mali, he scored 12 points as Angola secured its 12th title.

== Personal ==
Miguel co-founded the M3M Foundation, which organizes youth basketball camps in Angola to connect local talent with education and athletic opportunities abroad.

== Honours ==
National team

- AfroBasket: 2025 – Gold medal

South Florida Bulls

- AAC Sixth Man of the Year – 2024
- AAC Most Improved Player – 2024
- All-AAC Second Team – 2024

Maryland Terrapins

- Barclays Center Classic MVP – 2025
- Big Ten Sportsmanship Award – 2025
