= Salif Traoré =

Malian politician

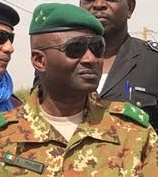
- Born: Ségou
- Occupation: Politician, minister

General Salif Traoré is a Malian politician. He graduated from the École spéciale militaire de Saint-Cyr. He has served as the Malian Minister of Security & Civilian Protection since September 2015. He believes in combatting terrorism by collecting better intelligence.
