= 2027 FIBA Basketball World Cup qualification (Africa) =

2027 FIBA Basketball World Cup
African Qualifiers

Tournament details
- Dates: November 2025 – March 2027
- Teams: 16

Official website
- African qualifiers website

The 2027 FIBA Basketball World Cup qualification for the FIBA Africa region, will begin in November 2025 and will conclude in March 2027. The process will determine the five African teams that will participate at the 2027 FIBA World Cup.

== Format ==
The qualification structure is as follows:

- First round: 16 teams are divided into four groups of four teams to play a double round-robin system (home-and-away or two tournaments at a single venue). The three best-placed teams from each group will advance to the second round.
- Second round: 12 teams will be divided into two groups of six teams. Each group will be formed from teams that advanced from the four first round groups. All results from the previous round will be carried over. The two best-placed teams from each group and the best third-placed team will qualify for the World Cup.

== Entrants ==
The 16 teams that qualified for AfroBasket 2025 will participate in the first round of the 2027 FIBA Basketball World Cup African qualifiers.

- Angola
- Cameroon
- Cape Verde
- DR Congo
- Egypt
- Guinea
- Ivory Coast
- Libya
- Madagascar
- Mali
- Nigeria
- Rwanda
- Senegal
- South Sudan
- Tunisia
- Uganda

== Qualifiers ==
=== Draw ===
The draw was held on 13 May 2025.

=== Seeding ===
The seeding was announced on 9 May 2025.

Pot 1
Team	Pos
South Sudan	23
Ivory Coast	31

Pot 5
Team	Pos
Cameroon	64
DR Congo	72

Pot 2
Team	Pos
Angola	33
Tunisia	36

Pot 6
Team	Pos
Guinea	75
Mali	83

Pot 3
Team	Pos
Egypt	38
Nigeria	42

Pot 7
Team	Pos
Uganda	85
Rwanda	93

Pot 4
Team	Pos
Cape Verde	45
Senegal	47

Pot 8
Team	Pos
Libya	94
Madagascar	105

=== First round ===
All times are local.

==== Group A ====
Pos	Team	Pld	W	L	PF	PA	PD	Pts	Qualification
1	Cameroon	6	5	1	460	431	+29	11	Second round
2	South Sudan	6	4	2	496	392	+104	10	Second round
3	Cape Verde	6	3	3	479	491	−12	9	Second round
4	Libya	6	0	6	399	520	−121	6	

Source: FIBA
Rules for classification: 1) Points; 2) Head-to-head results; 3) Points difference; 4) Points scored.

27 November 2025	Cameroon	77–82	Cape Verde	Radès, Tunisia
11:00	Scoring by quarter: 19–12, 17–26, 22–27, 19–17
	Pts: Nnoko 14; Rebs: Bayehe 11; Asts: Hill 5	Boxscore	Pts: I. Almeida 20; Rebs: I. Almeida 11; Asts: I. Almeida 8	Arena: Salle Multidisciplinaire de Radès; Attendance: 100; Referees: Wael Mostafa (EGY), Sofiane Si Youcef (ALG), Hassane Kamaté (CIV)

27 November 2025	South Sudan	79–55	Libya	Radès, Tunisia
14:00	Scoring by quarter: 19–23, 26–13, 9–9, 25–10
	Pts: Gach 15; Rebs: Kuath 10; Asts: Makoi 11	Boxscore	Pts: Sadi 19; Rebs: Sadi 8 Asts: Sadi 6	Arena: Salle Multidisciplinaire de Radès; Attendance: 100; Referees: Yann Davidson (MAD), Claudio Eiuba (ANG), Silver Houngbedji (BEN)

28 November 2025	Cape Verde	79–109	South Sudan	Radès, Tunisia
14:00	Scoring by quarter: 22–39, 15–25, 20–23, 22–22
	Pts: I. Almeida 17; Rebs: Mendes 10; Asts: Lima 8	Boxscore	Pts: Maker 23; Rebs: Kuath 12; Asts: Makoi 7	Arena: Salle Multidisciplinaire de Radès; Attendance: 100; Referees: Wael Mostafa (EGY), Claudio Eiuba (ANG), Amir Taboubi (TUN)

28 November 2025	Libya	71–77	Cameroon	Radès, Tunisia
17:00	Scoring by quarter: 17–20, 14–24, 12–21, 28–12
	Pts: Zeew 22; Rebs: Sadi 8 Asts: Sadi 10	Boxscore	Pts: Hill 14; Rebs: Nnoko 11; Asts: Hill 6	Arena: Salle Multidisciplinaire de Radès; Attendance: 100; Referees: Yann Davidson (MAD), Hassane Kamaté (CIV), Erick Otieno (KEN)

30 November 2025	Cameroon	60–56	South Sudan	Radès, Tunisia
11:00	Scoring by quarter: 19–9, 18–15, 8–15, 15–17
	Pts: Bayehe, Hill 15; Rebs: Bayehe 8 Asts: Mouaha 8	Boxscore	Pts: Gach 15; Rebs: Adel 11; Asts: Gach 8	Arena: Salle Multidisciplinaire de Radès; Attendance: 100; Referees: Yann Davidson (MAD), Sofiane Si Youcef (ALG), Claudio Eiuba (ANG)

30 November 2025	Libya	74–85	Cape Verde	Radès, Tunisia
14:00	Scoring by quarter: 16–28, 12–14, 20–15, 26–28
	Pts: Al-Maghribi 20; Rebs: Al-Maghribi 14; Asts: Sadi 8	Boxscore	Pts: J. Almeida 16; Rebs: Mendes 10; Asts: I. Almeida, Delgado 6	Arena: Salle Multidisciplinaire de Radès; Attendance: 100; Referees: Wael Mostafa (EGY), Amir Taboubi (TUN), Silver Houngbedji (BEN)

2 July 2026	Libya	57–95	South Sudan	Douala, Cameroon
15:00	Scoring by quarter: 7–22, 11–20, 18–27, 21–26
	Pts: Badrush 17; Rebs: Badrush 5 Asts: Sadi 4	Boxscore	Pts: Uguak 15; Rebs: Kuath, Thor 7 Asts: Adel, Panoam 6	Arena: Japoma Arena; Attendance: 200; Referees: Mbaye Seye (SEN), Amir Taboubi (TUN), Mohamed Diawara (MLI)

2 July 2026	Cape Verde	72–82	Cameroon	Douala, Cameroon
18:00	Scoring by quarter: 15–19, 15–20, 15–24, 27–19
	Pts: I. Almeida 16; Rebs: Mendes 11; Asts: I. Almeida, Tavares 3	Boxscore	Pts: Bayehe, Hill 14; Rebs: Nnoko 9 Asts: Hill 7	Arena: Japoma Arena; Attendance: 1,000; Referees: Mahamadou Diallo (MLI), Oumar Sy (MTN), Zouhir Bouhabba (MAR)

4 July 2026	South Sudan	83–63	Cape Verde	Douala, Cameroon
15:00	Scoring by quarter: 23–17, 16–15, 23–16, 21–15
	Pts: Wur 19; Rebs: Bile, Kuath 8 Asts: five players 3	Boxscore	Pts: I. Almeida 10; Rebs: Brito 12; Asts: I. Almeida 4	Arena: Japoma Arena; Attendance: 500; Referees: Mahamadou Diallo (MLI), Mohamed Diawara (MLI), Vianney Diop (CIV)

4 July 2026	Cameroon	86–76	Libya	Douala
18:00	Scoring by quarter: 27–14, 23–23, 18–19, 18–20
	Pts: Ateba 29; Rebs: Nnoko 7 Asts: Hill 8	Boxscore	Pts: Badrush 19; Rebs: Rizq 7 Asts: Badrush 6	Arena: Japoma Arena; Referees: Mbaye Seye (SEN), Oumar Sy (MTN), Khaled Ahmed (EGY)

5 July 2026	Cape Verde	98–66	Libya	Douala, Cameroon
15:00	Scoring by quarter: 32–10, 15–19, 30–19, 21–18
	Pts: Spencer 21; Rebs: Spencer 10; Asts: I. Almeida 13	Boxscore	Pts: Rizq 13; Rebs: Rizq 9 Asts: Benalhaj, Badrush 5	Arena: Japoma Arena; Attendance: 500; Referees: Mahamadou Diallo (MLI), Zouhir Bouhabba (MAR), Vianney Diop (CIV)

5 July 2026	South Sudan	74–78	Cameroon	Douala, Cameroon
18:00	Scoring by quarter: 20–24, 18–20, 15–12, 21–22
	Pts: Makoi 18; Rebs: Mathiang 9 Asts: Makoi 6	Boxscore	Pts: Hill 22; Rebs: Bayehe 11; Asts: Gbetkom 4	Arena: Japoma Arena; Attendance: 2,500; Referees: Mbaye Seye (SEN), Amir Taboubi (TUN), Khaled Ahmed (EGY)

==== Group B ====
Pos	Team	Pld	W	L	PF	PA	PD	Pts	Qualification
1	Senegal	6	5	1	529	406	+123	11 (Note: Senegal 165–162 Ivory Coast)	Second round
2	Ivory Coast	6	5	1	569	451	+118	11	Second round
3	DR Congo	6	2	4	398	495	−97	8	Second round
4	Madagascar	6	0	6	442	586	−144	6	

Source: FIBA
Rules for classification: 1) Points; 2) Head-to-head results; 3) Points difference; 4) Points scored.
Notes:

26 February 2026	DR Congo	87–79	Madagascar	Dakar, Senegal
18:00	Scoring by quarter: 29–11, 16–21, 16–29, 26–18
	Pts: Jordan 19; Rebs: Sakho 19; Asts: Jordan, Sakho 6	Boxscore	Pts: Razanamahenina 27; Rebs: M'Madi 7 Asts: M'Madi 6	Arena: Marius Ndiaye Stadium; Attendance: 700; Referees: Jean Ruhamiriza (RWA), Claudio Eiuba (ANG), Imad Driouach (MAR)

26 February 2026	Senegal	80–90	Ivory Coast	Dakar
21:00	Scoring by quarter: 14–28, 23–20, 25–18, 18–24
	Pts: Boissy, Faye 13; Rebs: Faye 8 Asts: Boissy 8	Boxscore	Pts: Yebo 15; Rebs: Kouadio 7 Asts: Moularé 4	Arena: Marius Ndiaye Stadium; Attendance: 3,500; Referees: Amr Aboollo (EGY), Sofiane Si Youcef (ALG), Amr Zahed (EGY)

28 February 2026	Ivory Coast	96–59	DR Congo	Dakar, Senegal
18:00	Scoring by quarter: 23–29, 25–11, 16–9, 32–10
	Pts: Dally, Zouzoua 15; Rebs: Tape 6 Asts: Moularé 5	Boxscore	Pts: Nyembo 14; Rebs: Nyembo 7 Asts: Lukoji 5	Arena: Marius Ndiaye Stadium; Attendance: 1,200; Referees: Amr Aboollo (EGY), Silver Houngbedji (BEN), Imad Driouach (MAR)

28 February 2026	Madagascar	66–99	Senegal	Dakar, Senegal
21:00	Scoring by quarter: 19–22, 12–32, 17–28, 18–17
	Pts: Razanamahenina 13; Rebs: Raharimanantoanina 8 Asts: M'Madi 5	Boxscore	Pts: Badio 21; Rebs: Camara 9 Asts: Mané 5	Arena: Marius Ndiaye Stadium; Attendance: 3,500; Referees: Jean Ruhamiriza (RWA), Sofiane Si Youcef (ALG), Erick Otieno (KEN)

1 March 2026	Madagascar	74–99	Ivory Coast	Dakar, Senegal
18:00	Scoring by quarter: 16–19, 21–28, 12–27, 25–25
	Pts: Raharimanantoanina 20; Rebs: Randriamananjara 5 Asts: Razanamahenina 6	Boxscore	Pts: Cissé 19; Rebs: Tape, Yebo 8 Asts: Moularé 11	Arena: Marius Ndiaye Stadium; Attendance: 850; Referees: Jean Ruhamiriza (RWA), Claudio Eiuba (ANG), Amr Zahed (EGY)

1 March 2026	Senegal	75–56	DR Congo	Dakar
21:00	Scoring by quarter: 23–16, 26–10, 11–12, 15–18
	Pts: Badio 20; Rebs: Badio 9 Asts: Badio 8	Boxscore	Pts: Jordan 13; Rebs: Sakho 8 Asts: Jordan, Lukoji 4	Arena: Marius Ndiaye Stadium; Attendance: 3,500; Referees: Amr Aboollo (EGY), Silver Houngbedji (BEN), Erick Otieno (KEN)

2 July 2026	Madagascar	62–82	DR Congo	Dakar, Senegal
15:00	Scoring by quarter: 8–16, 7–27, 30–21, 17–18
	Pts: M'Madi 14; Rebs: Andriatsarafara, M'Madi 7 Asts: Razanamahenina 5	Boxscore	Pts: Munanga 23; Rebs: three players 9 Asts: Jordan 5	Arena: Marius Ndiaye Stadium; Attendance: 125; Referees: Kingsley Ojeaburu (NGR), Guy Sani (CMR), Said Boukbir (MAR)

2 July 2026	Ivory Coast	72–85	Senegal	Dakar, Senegal
18:00	Scoring by quarter: 16–29, 20–26, 20–15, 16–15
	Pts: Moularé 19; Rebs: Sidibé 11; Asts: Moularé 5	Boxscore	Pts: Badio 23; Rebs: Badio, Ndiaye 9 Asts: Badio 6	Arena: Marius Ndiaye Stadium; Attendance: 3,400; Referees: Wael Mostafa (EGY), Adlen Larouci (ALG), Peter Ontita (KEN)

4 July 2026	DR Congo	51–94	Ivory Coast	Dakar, Senegal
15:00	Scoring by quarter: 12–17, 13–27, 12–25, 14–25
	Pts: Jordan 11; Rebs: three players 7 Asts: Jordan 3	Boxscore	Pts: Moularé 17; Rebs: three players 7 Asts: Zouzoua 5	Arena: Marius Ndiaye Stadium; Attendance: 125; Referees: Kingsley Ojeaburu (NGR), Adlen Larouci (ALG), Haytham Ihaqaf (LBA)

4 July 2026	Senegal	101–59	Madagascar	Dakar
18:00	Scoring by quarter: 28–17, 24–11, 24–12, 25–19
	Pts: Badio 22; Rebs: Faye, Sané 10; Asts: Badio 7	Boxscore	Pts: Razanamahenina 14; Rebs: Raharimanantoanina 9 Asts: Randriamampionona 4	Arena: Marius Ndiaye Stadium; Attendance: 320; Referees: Wael Mostafa (EGY), Guy Sani (CMR), David Domingos (ANG)

5 July 2026	Ivory Coast	118–102	Madagascar	Dakar, Senegal
15:00	Scoring by quarter: 34–24, 28–31, 23–24, 33–23
	Pts: Moulare 23; Rebs: Sidibe 7 Asts: Moulare 9	Boxscore	Pts: Raharimanantoanina 23; Rebs: Rakotonanahary 8 Asts: M'Madi 6	Arena: Marius Ndiaye Stadium; Attendance: 200; Referees: Wael Mostafa (EGY), David Domingos (ANG), Said Boukbir (MAR)

5 July 2026	DR Congo	63–89	Senegal	Dakar, Senegal
18:00	Scoring by quarter: 21–24, 23–19, 8–22, 11–24
	Pts: Jordan 20; Rebs: Kande 8 Asts: Jordan 4	Boxscore	Pts: Faye 22; Rebs: Ndiaye 8 Asts: Diop 10	Arena: Marius Ndiaye Stadium; Attendance: 3,450; Referees: Kingsley Ojeaburu (NGR), Haytham Ihaqaf (LBA), Peter Ontita (KEN)

==== Group C ====
Pos	Team	Pld	W	L	PF	PA	PD	Pts	Qualification
1	Guinea	6	4	2	435	386	+49	10 (Note: Head-to-head: Guinea 6 Pts, +11 PD; Tunisia 6 Pts, +9 PD; Nigeria 6 Pts, −20 PD.)	Second round
2	Tunisia	6	4	2	449	411	+38	10	Second round
3	Nigeria	6	4	2	478	448	+30	10	Second round
4	Rwanda	6	0	6	397	514	−117	6	

Source: FIBA
Rules for classification: 1) Points; 2) Head-to-head results; 3) Points difference; 4) Points scored.
Notes:

27 November 2025	Nigeria	78–88(OT)	Tunisia	Radès, Tunisia
17:00	Scoring by quarter: 15–12, 17–23, 21–18, 20–20, Overtime: 5–15
	Pts: Zanna 22; Rebs: Zanna 8 Asts: Ogundiran 6	Boxscore	Pts: Abada 29; Rebs: Lahyani 10; Asts: Abada 5	Arena: Salle Multidisciplinaire de Radès; Attendance: 500; Referees: Amr Aboollo (EGY), Oumar Sy (MTN), Imad Driouach (MAR)

27 November 2025	Rwanda	70–82	Guinea	Radès, Tunisia
20:00	Scoring by quarter: 18–18, 12–26, 17–18, 23–20
	Pts: Hagumintwari, Ndizeye 18; Rebs: McCormack 14; Asts: Nshobouzoua 6	Boxscore	Pts: Evans 25; Rebs: Sy 8 Asts: Boum 6	Arena: Salle Multidisciplinaire de Radès; Attendance: 50; Referees: Mbaye Seye (SEN), Mahamadou Diallo (MLI), Tonton Banza (COD)

29 November 2025	Guinea	69–55	Nigeria	Radès, Tunisia
14:00	Scoring by quarter: 22–16, 13–10, 17–15, 17–14
	Pts: Boum 21; Rebs: Dramé 12; Asts: three players 3	Boxscore	Pts: Udeze 16; Rebs: Udeze 9 Asts: Ogundiran 6	Arena: Salle Multidisciplinaire de Radès; Attendance: 100; Referees: Amr Aboollo (EGY), Mahamadou Diallo (MLI), Imad Driouach (MAR)

29 November 2025	Tunisia	79–66	Rwanda	Radès
17:00	Scoring by quarter: 16–16, 24–15, 21–11, 18–24
	Pts: Jawadi, Lahyani 21; Rebs: Lahyani 8 Asts: Abada 6	Boxscore	Pts: Ndizeye 20; Rebs: McCormack 17; Asts: De Dieu Furaha 5	Arena: Salle Multidisciplinaire de Radès; Attendance: 1,000; Referees: Mbaye Seye (SEN), Kouakou Niamien (CIV), Zouhir Bouhabba (MAR)

30 November 2025	Guinea	66–57	Tunisia	Radès, Tunisia
17:00	Scoring by quarter: 14–9, 13–16, 20–17, 19–15
	Pts: Evans 24; Rebs: Dramé 12; Asts: Boum 5	Boxscore	Pts: Lahyani, Marnaoui 14; Rebs: Lahyani 8 Asts: Abada 8	Arena: Salle Multidisciplinaire de Radès; Attendance: 2,500; Referees: Mbaye Seye (SEN), Oumar Sy (MTN), Imad Driouach (MAR)

30 November 2025	Nigeria	75–69(OT)	Rwanda	Radès, Tunisia
20:00	Scoring by quarter: 12–21, 13–6, 20–9, 16–25, Overtime: 14–8
	Pts: Udeze 30; Rebs: Udeze 10; Asts: Nwamu 10	Boxscore	Pts: Ndizeye 19; Rebs: De Dieu Furaha 9 Asts: Ndizeye 4	Arena: Salle Multidisciplinaire de Radès; Attendance: 100; Referees: Amr Aboollo (EGY), Kouakou Niamien (CIV), Tonton Banza (COD)

2 July 2026	Guinea	89–63	Rwanda	Belas, Angola
10:00	Scoring by quarter: 26–14, 19–27, 18–12, 26–10
	Pts: Boum 17; Rebs: Keita 9 Asts: Doumbouya 6	Boxscore	Pts: Uwitonze 17; Rebs: Furaha 8 Asts: Umuhoza 4	Arena: Pavilhão Multiusos de Luanda; Attendance: 200; Referees: Claudio Eiuba (ANG), Tonton Banza (COD), Amr Zahed (EGY)

2 July 2026	Tunisia	81–84	Nigeria	Belas, Angola
13:00	Scoring by quarter: 21–23, 23–20, 19–21, 18–20
	Pts: Lahiani, Abada 21; Rebs: Lahiani 8 Asts: Abada 9	Boxscore	Pts: I. Iroegbu, Metu 17; Rebs: Metu 8 Asts: U. Iroegbu 6	Arena: Pavilhão Multiusos de Luanda; Attendance: 60; Referees: Amr Aboollo (EGY), Hassane Kamaté (CIV), Michel Djeugoue (CMR)

3 July 2026	Nigeria	80–79	Guinea	Belas, Angola
16:00	Scoring by quarter: 23–17, 23–23, 16–28, 18–11
	Pts: Agada 22; Rebs: Akobundu-Ehiogu, Metu 8 Asts: U. Iroegbu 6	Boxscore	Pts: Doumbouya 23; Rebs: Evans 9 Asts: Evans 8	Arena: Pavilhão Multiusos de Luanda; Attendance: 500; Referees: Claudio Eiuba (ANG), Hassane Kamaté (CIV), Mohammad Shabani (TAN)

3 July 2026	Rwanda	67–83	Tunisia	Belas, Angola
19:00	Scoring by quarter: 15–22, 20–15, 16–22, 16–24
	Pts: De Dieu Furaha 12; Rebs: De Dieu Furaha 7 Asts: De Dieu Furaha 5	Boxscore	Pts: Lahyani 20; Rebs: Lahyani 14; Asts: Abada 7	Arena: Pavilhão Multiusos de Luanda; Attendance: 40; Referees: Amr Aboollo (EGY), Tonton Banza (COD), Harouna Maiga (BUR)

5 July 2026	Rwanda	62–106	Nigeria	Belas, Angola
10:00	Scoring by quarter: 14–25, 15–24, 15–31, 18–26
	Pts: Twa; Rebs: Irankunda 7 Asts: Kwizera 4	Boxscore	Pts: U. Iroegbu 17; Rebs: Mekowulu 7 Asts: Agada 8	Arena: Pavilhão Multiusos de Luanda; Attendance: 100; Referees: Amr Aboollo (EGY), Amr Zahed (EGY), Mohammad Shabani (TAN)

5 July 2026	Tunisia	61–50	Guinea	Belas, Angola
13:00	Scoring by quarter: 17–10, 9–17, 15–15, 20–8
	Pts: Abada 15; Rebs: Lahiani 14; Asts: Jawadi 4	Boxscore	Pts: Boum, Dramé 13; Rebs: Dramé 12; Asts: Boum, Evans 3	Arena: Pavilhão Multiusos de Luanda; Attendance: 500; Referees: Claudio Eiuba (ANG), Harouna Maiga (BUR), Michel Djeugoue (CMR)

==== Group D ====
Pos	Team	Pld	W	L	PF	PA	PD	Pts	Qualification
1	Mali	6	5	1	484	446	+38	11	Second round
2	Angola	6	4	2	508	435	+73	10	Second round
3	Egypt	6	3	3	466	442	+24	9	Second round
4	Uganda	6	0	6	384	519	−135	6	

Source: FIBA
Rules for classification: 1) Points; 2) Head-to-head results; 3) Points difference; 4) Points scored.

26 February 2026	Angola	90–68	Uganda	Alexandria, Egypt
20:00	Scoring by quarter: 27–13, 18–14, 28–19, 17–22
	Pts: Miguel 19; Rebs: Kokila 10; Asts: Dundão 11	Boxscore	Pts: Geu 17; Rebs: Geu 12; Asts: Sibande 7	Arena: Borg Al Arab Sports Hall; Attendance: 300; Referees: Mbaye Seye (SEN), Arnold Moseya (RSA), Walelign Gebeto (ETH)

26 February 2026	Mali	86–77	Egypt	Alexandria, Egypt
23:00	Scoring by quarter: 26–22, 20–12, 23–26, 17–27
	Pts: Ballo 23; Rebs: Ballo 12; Asts: Kanouté 10	Boxscore	Pts: Gendy 22; Rebs: Oraby 8 Asts: Amin 5	Arena: Borg Al Arab Sports Hall; Attendance: 2,000; Referees: Yann Davidson (MAD), Didier Gaga (RWA), Oumar Sy (MTN)

28 February 2026	Uganda	73–84	Mali	Alexandria, Egypt
20:00	Scoring by quarter: 17–23, 31–22, 13–24, 12–15
	Pts: Opong 24; Rebs: Sibande 9 Asts: Sibande 8	Boxscore	Pts: Kanouté 27; Rebs: Ballo 10; Asts: Kanouté 9	Arena: Borg Al Arab Sports Hall; Attendance: 300; Referees: Mbaye Seye (SEN), Guy Sani (CMR), Oumar Sy (MTN)

28 February 2026	Egypt	72–83	Angola	Alexandria
23:00	Scoring by quarter: 16–25, 22–21, 20–16, 14–21
	Pts: Gendy 18; Rebs: Marei 11; Asts: Mahmoud, Marei 3	Boxscore	Pts: Dundão 29; Rebs: Fernando 10; Asts: Dundão 4	Arena: Borg Al Arab Sports Hall; Attendance: 500; Referees: Yann Davidson (MAD), Arnold Moseya (RSA), Kouakou Niamien (CIV)

1 March 2026	Mali	80–79	Angola	Alexandria, Egypt
20:00	Scoring by quarter: 19–20, 27–24, 19–18, 15–17
	Pts: Kanouté 23; Rebs: Ballo 7 Asts: Kanouté 15	Boxscore	Pts: Dundão 24; Rebs: Kokila 7 Asts: Dundão 9	Arena: Borg Al Arab Sports Hall; Attendance: 400; Referees: Yann Davidson (MAD), Didier Gaga (RWA), Walelign Gebeto (ETH)

1 March 2026	Uganda	52–91	Egypt	Alexandria, Egypt
23:00	Scoring by quarter: 14–27, 9–16, 16–22, 13–26
	Pts: Geu 14; Rebs: Sibande 10; Asts: Rugette 4	Boxscore	Pts: Metwaly 16; Rebs: Mahmoud 11; Asts: Metwaly 7	Arena: Borg Al Arab Sports Hall; Attendance: 400; Referees: Mbaye Seye (SEN), Guy Sani (CMR), Kouakou Niamien (CIV)

2 July 2026	Egypt	70–78	Mali	Belas, Angola
16:00	Scoring by quarter: 19–21, 16–22, 11–15, 24–20
	Pts: Mahmoud 14; Rebs: Mahmoud 10; Asts: Amin 4	Boxscore	Pts: Coulibaly 17; Rebs: A. Diarra 14; Asts: H. Diarra, Kanouté 5	Arena: Pavilhão Multiusos de Luanda; Attendance: 200; Referees: Erick Otieno (KEN), Silver Houngbedji (BEN), Imad Driouach (MAR)

2 July 2026	Uganda	62–95	Angola	Belas, Angola
19:00	Scoring by quarter: 14–19, 21–23, 11–31, 16–22
	Pts: Baael, Musiime 17; Rebs: Sibande 8 Asts: Sibande 5	Boxscore	Pts: Miguel 17; Rebs: Fernando 6 Asts: Dundão 9	Arena: Pavilhão Multiusos de Luanda; Attendance: 1,000; Referees: Didier Gaga (RWA), Sofiane Si Youcef (ALG), Kouakou Niamien (CIV)

4 July 2026	Mali	82–59	Uganda	Belas, Angola
16:00	Scoring by quarter: 18–11, 21–14, 21–18, 22–16
	Pts: Kanouté 20; Rebs: Ballo 11; Asts: Kanouté 5	Boxscore	Pts: Geu 13; Rebs: Geu 8 Asts: three players 2	Arena: Pavilhão Multiusos de Luanda; Attendance: 40; Referees: Didier Gaga (RWA), Silver Houngbedji (BEN), Antonio Sitoe (MOZ)

4 July 2026	Angola	73–79	Egypt	Belas
19:00	Scoring by quarter: 23–24, 19–12, 21–24, 10–19
	Pts: Gakou 15; Rebs: Fernando 6 Asts: Dundão 8	Boxscore	Pts: Amin 22; Rebs: Marei 8 Asts: Moussa 6	Arena: Pavilhão Multiusos de Luanda; Attendance: 4,000; Referees: Erick Otieno (KEN), Sofiane Si Youcef (ALG), Walelign Gebeto (ETH)

5 July 2026	Egypt	77–70(OT)	Uganda	Belas, Angola
16:00	Scoring by quarter: 13–21, 16–11, 19–12, 19–23, Overtime: 10–3
	Pts: Abdelhalim 20; Rebs: Amin 11; Asts: Marei 5	Boxscore	Pts: Opong 20; Rebs: Musiime 11; Asts: Sibande 5	Arena: Pavilhão Multiusos de Luanda; Attendance: 1,000; Referees: Erick Otieno (KEN), Walelign Gebeto (ETH), Kouakou Niamien (CIV)

5 July 2026	Angola	88–74	Mali	Belas
19:00	Scoring by quarter: 21–21, 22–20, 22–17, 23–16
	Pts: Dundão, Miguel 22; Rebs: Fernando 8 Asts: Dundao, Fernando 4	Boxscore	Pts: Diarra 18; Rebs: Ballo 9 Asts: Kanoute 8	Arena: Pavilhão Multiusos de Luanda; Attendance: 6,000; Referees: Didier Gaga (RWA), Imad Driouach (MAR), Antonio Sitoe (MOZ)

=== Second round ===
The twelve qualified teams will be divided into two groups and play the other three teams from the other group twice. Group A will be paired with Group C and Group B with Group D. All results from the first round will be carried over.

==== Group E ====
Pos	Team	Pld	W	L	PF	PA	PD	Pts	Qualification
1	Cameroon	9	7	2	688	644	+44	16 (Note: Cameroon 138–130 South Sudan)	2027 FIBA Basketball World Cup
2	South Sudan	9	7	2	738	617	+121	16	2027 FIBA Basketball World Cup
3	Guinea	9	6	3	677	595	+82	15	Best third placed team
4	Tunisia	9	5	4	645	629	+16	14 (Note: Tunisia 169–162 Nigeria)	
5	Nigeria	9	5	4	719	692	+27	14	
6	Cape Verde	9	3	6	680	732	−52	12	

Updated to game(s) played on 30 August 2026. Source: FIBA
Rules for classification: 1) Points; 2) Head-to-head results; 3) Points difference; 4) Points scored.
Notes:

27 August 2026	Guinea	71–81	South Sudan	Radès, Tunisia
13:00	Scoring by quarter: 15–25, 14–28, 22–12, 20–16
	Pts: Boum 19; Rebs: Dramé 13; Asts: Doumbouya 5	Boxscore	Pts: Jones 18; Rebs: Gabriel 10; Asts: Jones 7	Arena: Salle Multidisciplinaire de Radès; Attendance: 100; Referees: Erick Otieno (KEN), Hassane Kamaté (CIV), Claudio Eiuba (ANG)

27 August 2026	Nigeria	62–78	Cameroon	Radès, Tunisia
16:00	Scoring by quarter: 14–23, 18–18, 16–19, 14–18
	Pts: Agada 13; Rebs: Okogie 10; Asts: Okogie 6	Boxscore	Pts: Missi 24; Rebs: Missi 9 Asts: Hill 7	Arena: Salle Multidisciplinaire de Radès; Attendance: 100; Referees: Amr Aboollo (EGY), Amr Zahed (EGY), Mohamed Diawara (MLI)

27 August 2026	Tunisia	60–56	Cape Verde	Radès
19:00	Scoring by quarter: 11–16, 24–8, 10–11, 15–21
	Pts: Abada 26; Rebs: Ghyaza 7 Asts: Abada 4	Boxscore	Pts: I. Almeida 14; Rebs: Santos-Silva 11; Asts: Correia 4	Arena: Salle Multidisciplinaire de Radès; Attendance: 500; Referees: Mbaye Seye (SEN), Oumar Sy (MTN), Walelign Gebeto (ETH)

28 August 2026	South Sudan	82–79	Nigeria	Radès, Tunisia
13:00	Scoring by quarter: 30–19, 13–27, 21–15, 18–18
	Pts: Shayok 19; Rebs: Jones 9 Asts: Jones 13	Boxscore	Pts: Metu 17; Rebs: Agada 10; Asts: Moneke 6	Arena: Salle Multidisciplinaire de Radès; Referees: Amr Aboollo (EGY), Wael Mostafa (EGY), Oumar Sy (MTN)

28 August 2026	Cape Verde	61–81	Guinea	Radès, Tunisia
16:00	Scoring by quarter: 16–23, 18–23, 16–17, 11–18
	Pts: I. Almeida 23; Rebs: Santos-Silva 11; Asts: Delgado 4	Boxscore	Pts: Boum 14; Rebs: Dramé 11; Asts: three players 3	Arena: Salle Multidisciplinaire de Radès; Referees: Erick Otieno (KEN), Tonton Banza (COD), Claudio Eiuba (ANG)

28 August 2026	Cameroon	83–61	Tunisia	Radès, Tunisia
19:00	Scoring by quarter: 15–13, 22–13, 30–15, 16–20
	Pts: Missi 19; Rebs: Missi 14; Asts: Choh 5	Boxscore	Pts: Toumi 19; Rebs: Lahyani 6 Asts: Lahyani 3	Arena: Salle Multidisciplinaire de Radès; Attendance: 500; Referees: Mbaye Seye (SEN), Hassane Kamaté (CIV), Mahamadou Diallo (MLI)

30 August 2026	Nigeria	100–84	Cape Verde	Radès, Tunisia
13:00	Scoring by quarter: 23–9, 29–26, 24–19, 24–30
	Pts: Agada 26; Rebs: Metu 12; Asts: Okogie 11	Boxscore	Pts: I. Almeida 32; Rebs: I. Almeida 8 Asts: I. Almeida 3	Arena: Salle Multidisciplinaire de Radès; Referees: Mbaye Seye (SEN), Tonton Banza (COD), Wael Mostafa (EGY)

30 August 2026	Guinea	90–67	Cameroon	Radès, Tunisia
16:00	Scoring by quarter: 28–13, 19–25, 20–14, 23–15
	Pts: Evans 19; Rebs: Doumbouya, Sy 6 Asts: Diakite, Evans 5	Boxscore	Pts: Moute a Bidias 17; Rebs: Missi 10; Asts: Choh, Hill 5	Arena: Salle Multidisciplinaire de Radès; Attendance: 61; Referees: Amr Aboollo (EGY), Amr Zahed (EGY), Mohamed Diawara (MLI)

30 August 2026	Tunisia	75–79	South Sudan	Radès
19:00	Scoring by quarter: 22–20, 20–20, 19–21, 14–18
	Pts: Toumi 24; Rebs: Lahyani 9 Asts: Abada 7	Boxscore	Pts: Jones 20; Rebs: Deng 11; Asts: Gach 4	Arena: Salle Multidisciplinaire de Radès; Attendance: 1,200; Referees: Erick Otieno (KEN), Mahamadou Diallo (MLI), Walelign Gebeto (ETH)

25 February 2027	Cameroon	vs.	Nigeria
		Boxscore

25 February 2027	South Sudan	vs.	Guinea
		Boxscore

25 February 2027	Cape Verde	vs.	Tunisia
		Boxscore

26 February 2027	Tunisia	vs.	Cameroon
		Boxscore

26 February 2027	Nigeria	vs.	South Sudan
		Boxscore

26 February 2027	Guinea	vs.	Cape Verde
		Boxscore

28 February 2027	Cameroon	vs.	Guinea
		Boxscore

28 February 2027	South Sudan	vs.	Tunisia
		Boxscore

28 February 2027	Cape Verde	vs.	Nigeria
		Boxscore

==== Group F ====
Pos	Team	Pld	W	L	PF	PA	PD	Pts	Qualification
1	Senegal	9	7	2	777	635	+142	16 (Note: Senegal 165–162 Ivory Coast)	2027 FIBA Basketball World Cup
2	Ivory Coast	9	7	2	794	685	+109	16	2027 FIBA Basketball World Cup
3	Angola	9	6	3	781	657	+124	15 (Note: Angola 167–154 Mali)	Best third placed team
4	Mali	9	6	3	733	702	+31	15	
5	Egypt	9	4	5	683	658	+25	13	
6	DR Congo	9	3	6	619	771	−152	12	

Updated to game(s) played on 30 August 2026. Source: FIBA
Rules for classification: 1) Points; 2) Head-to-head results; 3) Points difference; 4) Points scored.
Notes:

27 August 2026	Angola	100–68	DR Congo	Dakar, Senegal
12:30	Scoring by quarter: 25–20, 26–10, 18–19, 31–19
	Pts: Gakou 18; Rebs: Francisco 7 Asts: Dundão 8	Boxscore	Pts: Kamba 18; Rebs: Thamba 7 Asts: Baugh 6	Arena: Dakar Arena; Attendance: 50; Referees: Arnold Moseya (RSA), Amir Taboubi (TUN), Haytham Ihaqaf (LBA)

27 August 2026	Mali	77–83	Ivory Coast	Dakar, Senegal
15:30	Scoring by quarter: 21–27, 12–14, 18–16, 26–26
	Pts: Kanouté 23; Rebs: Ballo 9 Asts: Kanouté 7	Boxscore	Pts: Simmons 17; Rebs: Dadiet, Sidibé 9 Asts: Simmons 4	Arena: Dakar Arena; Attendance: 160; Referees: Jean Ruhamiriza (RWA), Imad Driouach (MAR), Guy Sani (CMR)

27 August 2026	Egypt	76–67	Senegal	Dakar, Senegal
18:30	Scoring by quarter: 13–17, 30–17, 21–17, 12–16
	Pts: Amin, Oraby 15; Rebs: Oraby 11; Asts: Mohamed 3	Boxscore	Pts: Boissy 15; Rebs: M. Faye, M. Ndiaye 7 Asts: Badio 8	Arena: Dakar Arena; Attendance: 550; Referees: Yann Davidson (MAD), Kingsley Ojeaburu (NGR), Peter Ontita (KEN)

29 August 2026	Ivory Coast	72–66	Egypt	Dakar, Senegal
12:30	Scoring by quarter: 17–13, 17–19, 25–19, 13–15
	Pts: Gassaud 16; Rebs: Traoré 8 Asts: Diabate 5	Boxscore	Pts: Mohamed 16; Rebs: Mahmoud 7 Asts: Amin 6	Arena: Dakar Arena; Attendance: 110; Referees: Yann Davidson (MAD), Kingsley Ojeaburu (NGR), Guy Sani (CMR)

29 August 2026	DR Congo	76–101	Mali	Dakar, Senegal
15:30	Scoring by quarter: 19–26, 17–22, 15–31, 25–22
	Pts: Baugh 19; Rebs: Munanga 13; Asts: Baugh 7	Boxscore	Pts: Kanouté 15; Rebs: Sanogo, Togo 5 Asts: Coulibaly 10	Arena: Dakar Arena; Attendance: 500; Referees: Arnold Moseya (RSA), Harouna Maiga (BUR), Zouhir Bouhabba (MAR)

29 August 2026	Senegal	84–82	Angola	Dakar
18:30	Scoring by quarter: 18–20, 25–26, 20–17, 21–19
	Pts: Badio 24; Rebs: Diagne 11; Asts: Badio 7	Boxscore	Pts: Miguel 28; Rebs: Gakou 7 Asts: Gonçalves 4	Arena: Dakar Arena; Attendance: 4,000; Referees: Jean Ruhamiriza (RWA), Sofiane Si Youcef (ALG), Imad Driouach (MAR)

30 August 2026	Egypt	75–77	DR Congo	Dakar, Senegal
12:30	Scoring by quarter: 18–22, 21–20, 14–18, 22–17
	Pts: El-Sheikh 16; Rebs: Mahmoud 11; Asts: Mahmoud 3	Boxscore	Pts: Kamba 23; Rebs: Kasibabu, Munanga 10; Asts: Baugh 7	Arena: Dakar Arena; Attendance: 50; Referees: Jean Ruhamiriza (RWA), Peter Ontita (KEN), Harouna Maiga (BUR)

30 August 2026	Angola	91–70	Ivory Coast	Dakar, Senegal
15:30	Scoring by quarter: 29–18, 18–15, 21–11, 23–26
	Pts: Dundão 15; Rebs: Macachi 12; Asts: Dundão 6	Boxscore	Pts: Simmons 16; Rebs: Dally, Sidibé 6 Asts: Dadiet 7	Arena: Dakar Arena; Attendance: 150; Referees: Yann Davidson (MAD), Sofiane Si Youcef (ALG), Zouhir Bouhabba (MAR)

30 August 2026	Mali	71–97	Senegal	Dakar, Senegal
18:30	Scoring by quarter: 12–25, 18–21, 20–23, 21–28
	Pts: Sanogo 17; Rebs: A. Diarra 12; Asts: Kanouté 8	Boxscore	Pts: Boissy 26; Rebs: Badji, Boissy 7 Asts: Badio 8	Arena: Dakar Arena; Attendance: 9,500; Referees: Arnold Moseya (RSA), Kingsley Ojeaburu (NGR), Amir Taboubi (TUN)

25 February 2027	Senegal	vs.	Egypt
		Boxscore

25 February 2027	Ivory Coast	vs.	Mali
		Boxscore

25 February 2027	DR Congo	vs.	Angola
		Boxscore

26 February 2027	Angola	vs.	Senegal
		Boxscore

26 February 2027	Egypt	vs.	Ivory Coast
		Boxscore

26 February 2027	Mali	vs.	DR Congo
		Boxscore

28 February 2027	Senegal	vs.	Mali
		Boxscore

28 February 2027	Ivory Coast	vs.	Angola
		Boxscore

28 February 2027	DR Congo	vs.	Egypt
		Boxscore

==== Best third placed team ====
Pos	Grp	Team	Pld	W	L	PF	PA	PD	Pts	Qualification
1	F	Angola	9	6	3	781	657	+124	15	2027 FIBA Basketball World Cup
2	E	Guinea	9	6	3	677	595	+82	15	

Updated to game(s) played on 29 August 2026. Source: FIBA
