= 2027 FIBA Basketball World Cup qualification =

2027 FIBA Basketball World Cup
Qualification

Tournament details
- Dates: 19 February 2024 – 2 March 2027
- Teams: 212 max. (from 212 federations)

Official website
- FIBA.basketball

The 2027 FIBA Basketball World Cup qualification process will determine 31 of the 32 teams that will qualify for the 2027 FIBA Basketball World Cup. As hosts, Qatar will receive automatic qualification for the tournament.

== Schedule of windows ==
Similar to the 2019 and the 2023 FIBA Basketball World Cup qualifications, the matches will be held in six windows over a 15-month period across all FIBA regions. 80 national teams will compete during the qualification process. The schedule for the six windows is as follows:

Window	Dates
1	24 November – 2 December 2025
2	23 February – 3 March 2026
3	29 June – 8 July 2026
4	24 August – 1 September 2026
5	23 November – 1 December 2026
6	22 February – 2 March 2027

== Qualified teams ==
Team	Qualification method	Date of qualification	Appearance(s)				Previous best performance (Note: Bold text indicates they hosted that edition.)	WR (Note: World ranking at start of tournament.)
Team	Qualification method	Date of qualification	Total	First	Last	Streak	Previous best performance	WR
Qatar	Host nation	28 April 2023	2nd	2006		1	21st place (2006)	TBD
Turkey	European Group J top three	31 August 2026	6th	2002	2019	1	2nd place (2010)	TBD

== Format ==
The qualifiers format for the 2027 FIBA Basketball World Cup remained unchanged, with six windows over a 15-month period across the four regions of Africa, Americas, Asia (including Oceania) and Europe. The qualifiers will take place from November 2025 to March 2027 with 80 national teams competing for a spot in the World Cup.

The road to the 2027 World Cup will begin in February 2024 with the start of the European pre-qualifiers, which will end at August 2024.

The draw for the qualifiers was held on 13 May 2025 in Doha.

FIBA zone	Qualifying tournaments		World Cup berths		
FIBA zone	Division A top ranked teams	Division B maximum possible entrants	Allocated berths	Berth as the host nation	Total berths
FIBA Africa	16	2	5	0	5
FIBA Americas	16	2	7	0	7
FIBA Asia; FIBA Oceania	16	17	7	1	8
FIBA Europe	32	13	12	0	12
Total	80	114	31	1	32

== Confederation qualifications ==
=== FIBA Africa ===
The 16 teams that qualified for the AfroBasket 2025 will participate in the African qualifiers.

==== First round ====
===== Group A =====
Pos	Team	Pld	W	L	PF	PA	PD	Pts	Qualification	(Cameroon)	(South Sudan)	(Cape Verde)	(Libya)
1	Cameroon	6	5	1	460	431	+29	**11**	Second round	—	60–56	77–82	86–76
2	South Sudan	6	4	2	496	392	+104	**10**	Second round	74–78	—	83–63	79–55
3	Cape Verde	6	3	3	479	491	−12	**9**	Second round	72–82	79–109	—	98–66
4	Libya	6	0	6	399	520	−121	**6**		71–77	57–95	74–85	—

Source: FIBA
Rules for classification: 1) Points; 2) Head-to-head results; 3) Points difference; 4) Points scored.

===== Group B =====
Pos	Team	Pld	W	L	PF	PA	PD	Pts	Qualification	(Senegal)	(Ivory Coast)	(Democratic Republic of the Congo)	(Madagascar)
1	Senegal	6	5	1	529	406	+123	**11 (Note: Senegal 165–162 Ivory Coast)**	Second round	—	80–90	75–56	101–59
2	Ivory Coast	6	5	1	569	451	+118	**11**	Second round	72–85	—	96–59	118–102
3	DR Congo	6	2	4	398	495	−97	**8**	Second round	63–89	51–94	—	87–79
4	Madagascar	6	0	6	442	586	−144	**6**		66–99	74–99	62–82	—

Source: FIBA
Rules for classification: 1) Points; 2) Head-to-head results; 3) Points difference; 4) Points scored.

===== Group C =====
Pos	Team	Pld	W	L	PF	PA	PD	Pts	Qualification	(Guinea)	(Tunisia)	(Nigeria)	(Rwanda)
1	Guinea	6	4	2	435	386	+49	**10 (Note: Head-to-head: Guinea 6 Pts, +11 PD; Tunisia 6 Pts, +9 PD; Nigeria 6 Pts, −20 PD.)**	Second round	—	66–57	69–55	89–63
2	Tunisia	6	4	2	449	411	+38	**10**	Second round	75–68	—	81–84	79–66
3	Nigeria	6	4	2	478	448	+30	**10**	Second round	80–79	78–88 (OT)	—	75–69 (OT)
4	Rwanda	6	0	6	397	514	−117	**6**		70–82	67–83	75–85	—

Source: FIBA
Rules for classification: 1) Points; 2) Head-to-head results; 3) Points difference; 4) Points scored.

===== Group D =====
Pos	Team	Pld	W	L	PF	PA	PD	Pts	Qualification	(Mali)	(Angola)	(Egypt)	(Uganda)
1	Mali	6	5	1	484	446	+38	**11**	Second round	—	80–79	86–77	82–59
2	Angola	6	4	2	508	435	+73	**10**	Second round	88–74	—	73–79	90–68
3	Egypt	6	3	3	466	442	+24	**9**	Second round	70–78	72–83	—	77–70 (OT)
4	Uganda	6	0	6	384	519	−135	**6**		73–84	62–95	52–91	—

Source: FIBA
Rules for classification: 1) Points; 2) Head-to-head results; 3) Points difference; 4) Points scored.

==== Second round ====
===== Group E =====
Pos	Team	Pld	W	L	PF	PA	PD	Pts	Qualification	(Cameroon)	(South Sudan)	(Guinea)	(Tunisia)	(Nigeria)	(Cape Verde)
1	Cameroon	9	7	2	688	644	+44	16 (Note: Cameroon 138–130 South Sudan)	2027 FIBA Basketball World Cup	—	60–56	28 Feb	83–61	25 Feb	77–82
2	South Sudan	9	7	2	738	617	+121	16	2027 FIBA Basketball World Cup	74–78	—	25 Feb	28 Feb	82–79	83–63
3	Guinea	9	6	3	677	595	+82	15	Best third placed team	90–67	71–81	—	66–57	69–55	26 Feb
4	Tunisia	9	5	4	645	629	+16	14 (Note: Tunisia 169–162 Nigeria)		26 Feb	75–79	61–50	—	81–84	60–56
5	Nigeria	9	5	4	719	692	+27	14		62–78	26 Feb	80–79	78–88 (OT)	—	100–84
6	Cape Verde	9	3	6	680	732	−52	12		72–82	79–109	61–81	25 Feb	28 Feb	—

Updated to game(s) played on 30 August 2026. Source: FIBA
Rules for classification: 1) Points; 2) Head-to-head results; 3) Points difference; 4) Points scored.

===== Group F =====
Pos	Team	Pld	W	L	PF	PA	PD	Pts	Qualification	(Senegal)	(Ivory Coast)	(Angola)	(Mali)	(Egypt)	(Democratic Republic of the Congo)
1	Senegal	9	7	2	777	635	+142	16 (Note: Senegal 165–162 Ivory Coast)	2027 FIBA Basketball World Cup	—	80–90	84–82	28 Feb	25 Feb	75–56
2	Ivory Coast	9	7	2	794	685	+109	16	2027 FIBA Basketball World Cup	72–85	—	28 Feb	25 Feb	72–66	96–59
3	Angola	9	6	3	781	657	+124	15 (Note: Angola 167–154 Mali)	Best third placed team	26 Feb	91–70	—	88–74	73–79	100–68
4	Mali	9	6	3	733	702	+31	15		71–97	77–83	80–79	—	86–77	26 Feb
5	Egypt	9	4	5	683	658	+25	13		76–67	26 Feb	72–83	70–78	—	75–77
6	DR Congo	9	3	6	619	771	−152	12		63–89	51–94	25 Feb	76–101	28 Feb	—

Updated to game(s) played on 30 August 2026. Source: FIBA
Rules for classification: 1) Points; 2) Head-to-head results; 3) Points difference; 4) Points scored.

=== FIBA Americas ===
The 16 teams participating in the Americas qualifiers consist of 12 teams from the 2025 FIBA AmeriCup and 4 teams from the Americas pre-qualifiers.

==== First round ====
===== Group A =====
Pos	Team	Pld	W	L	PF	PA	PD	Pts	Qualification	(United States)	(Dominican Republic)	(Mexico)	(Nicaragua)
1	United States	6	5	1	603	509	+94	**11**	Second round	—	79–87	123–88	123–93
2	Dominican Republic	6	4	2	533	472	+61	**10**	Second round	81–82	—	88–89	99–76
3	Mexico	6	3	3	552	548	+4	**9**	Second round	93–94	85–92	—	98–79
4	Nicaragua	6	0	6	448	607	−159	**6**		67–102	61–86	72–99	—

Source: FIBA
Rules for classification: 1) Points; 2) Head-to-head results; 3) Points difference; 4) Points scored.

===== Group B =====
Pos	Team	Pld	W	L	PF	PA	PD	Pts	Qualification	(Canada)	(The Bahamas)	(Puerto Rico)	(Jamaica)
1	Canada	6	6	0	624	491	+133	**12**	Second round	—	94–88	110–84	116–78
2	Bahamas	6	2	4	543	561	−18	**8 (Note: Bahamas 6 Pts, +24 PD; Puerto Rico 6 Pts, +21 PD; Jamaica 6 Pts, −45 PD)**	Second round	75–111	—	92–115	123–74
3	Puerto Rico	6	2	4	537	553	−16	**8**	Second round	85–96 (OT)	71–66	—	92–97
4	Jamaica	6	2	4	518	617	−99	**8**		81–97	96–99	92–90	—

Source: FIBA
Rules for classification: 1) Points; 2) Head-to-head results; 3) Points difference; 4) Points scored.

===== Group C =====
Pos	Team	Pld	W	L	PF	PA	PD	Pts	Qualification	(Brazil)	(Colombia)	(Chile)	(Venezuela)
1	Brazil	6	6	0	562	452	+110	**12**	Second round	—	101–72	82–78	94–84
2	Colombia	6	3	3	499	528	−29	**9**	Second round	80–104	—	79–81	80–78
3	Chile	6	2	4	433	463	−30	**8**	Second round	66–82	78–86	—	68–72
4	Venezuela	6	1	5	474	525	−51	**7**		88–103	86–102	66–78	—

Source: FIBA
Rules for classification: 1) Points; 2) Head-to-head results; 3) Points difference; 4) Points scored.

===== Group D =====
Pos	Team	Pld	W	L	PF	PA	PD	Pts	Qualification	(Uruguay)	(Argentina)	(Panama)	(Cuba)
1	Uruguay	6	5	1	501	409	+92	**11 (Note: Uruguay 137–135 Argentina)**	Second round	—	76–91	84–82	99–70
2	Argentina	6	5	1	517	400	+117	**11**	Second round	44–61	—	101–75	105–49
3	Panama	6	2	4	455	525	−70	**8**	Second round	60–93	71–96	—	83–70
4	Cuba	6	0	6	400	539	−139	**6**		62–88	68–80	81–84	—

Source: FIBA
Rules for classification: 1) Points; 2) Head-to-head results; 3) Points difference; 4) Points scored.

==== Second round ====
===== Group E =====
Pos	Team	Pld	W	L	PF	PA	PD	Pts	Qualification	(United States)	(Dominican Republic)	(Brazil)	(Mexico)	(Colombia)	(Chile)
1	United States	8	7	1	796	660	+136	15	2027 FIBA Basketball World Cup	—	79–87	28 Feb	123–88	104–80	25 Feb
2	Dominican Republic	8	6	2	728	628	+100	14 (Note: Dominican Republic 94–90 Brazil)	2027 FIBA Basketball World Cup	81–82	—	25 Feb	88–89	28 Feb	101–66
3	Brazil	8	6	2	726	625	+101	14	2027 FIBA Basketball World Cup	27 Nov	90–94	—	30 Nov	101–72	78–62
4	Mexico	8	5	3	743	708	+35	13	Best fourth placed team	93–94	85–92	79–74	—	112–86	28 Feb
5	Colombia	8	3	5	665	744	−79	11		30 Nov	27 Nov	80–104	25 Feb	—	79–81
6	Chile	8	2	6	570	653	−83	10		71–89	30 Nov	66–82	27 Nov	68–86	—

Updated to game(s) played on 31 August 2026. Source: FIBA
Rules for classification: 1) Points; 2) Head-to-head results; 3) Points difference; 4) Points scored.

===== Group F =====
Pos	Team	Pld	W	L	PF	PA	PD	Pts	Qualification	(Canada)	(Uruguay)	(Argentina)	(The Bahamas)	(Puerto Rico)	(Panama)
1	Canada	8	8	0	807	649	+158	16	2027 FIBA Basketball World Cup	—	28 Feb	97–92	94–88	110–84	25 Feb
2	Uruguay	8	6	2	675	587	+88	14 (Note: Uruguay 137–135 Argentina)	2027 FIBA Basketball World Cup	26 Nov	—	76–91	94–103	80–75	84–82
3	Argentina	8	6	2	698	572	+126	14	2027 FIBA Basketball World Cup	29 Nov	44–61	—	26 Nov	89–75	101–75
4	Bahamas	8	4	4	746	737	+9	12	Best fourth placed team	75–111	25 Feb	28 Feb	—	92–115	100–82
5	Puerto Rico	8	2	6	687	722	−35	10		85–96 (OT)	29 Nov	25 Feb	71–66	—	28 Feb
6	Panama	8	2	6	603	711	−108	10		66–86	60–93	71–96	29 Nov	26 Nov	—

Updated to game(s) played on 31 August 2026. Source: FIBA
Rules for classification: 1) Points; 2) Head-to-head results; 3) Points difference; 4) Points scored.

=== FIBA Asia and FIBA Oceania ===
The 16 teams that qualified for the 2025 FIBA Asia Cup will participate in the Asian qualifiers. Qatar will participate despite already qualified automatically as the host nation.

==== First round ====
===== Group A =====
Pos	Team	Pld	W	L	PF	PA	PD	Pts	Qualification	(Australia)	(New Zealand)	(Philippines)	(Guam)
1	Australia	6	6	0	565	403	+162	**12**	Second round	—	84–79	92–49	124–52
2	New Zealand	6	4	2	559	473	+86	**10**	Second round	77–79	—	106–102	129–75
3	Philippines	6	2	4	465	477	−12	**8**	Second round	66–93	66–69	—	95–71
4	Guam	6	0	6	391	627	−236	**6**		80–93	67–99	46–87	—

Source: FIBA
Rules for classification: 1) Points; 2) Head-to-head results; 3) Points difference; 4) Points scored.

===== Group B =====
Pos	Team	Pld	W	L	PF	PA	PD	Pts	Qualification	(Japan)	(South Korea)	(China)	(Chinese Taipei)
1	Japan	6	4	2	499	450	+49	**10**	Second round	—	78–72	80–87	90–64
2	South Korea	6	3	3	468	468	0	**9 (Note: South Korea 170–152 China.)**	Second round	81–79	—	90–76	80–82
3	China	6	3	3	504	509	−5	**9**	Second round	73–92	76–80	—	92–74
4	Chinese Taipei	6	2	4	463	507	−44	**8**		73–80	77–65	93–100	—

Source: FIBA
Rules for classification: 1) Points; 2) Head-to-head results; 3) Points difference; 4) Points scored.

===== Group C =====
Pos	Team	Pld	W	L	PF	PA	PD	Pts	Qualification	(Iran)	(Jordan)	(Syria)	(Iraq)
1	Iran	6	5	1	452	381	+71	**11 (Note: Iran 127–122 Jordan)**	Second round	—	60–73	72–68	94–68
2	Jordan	6	5	1	510	360	+150	**11**	Second round	49–67	—	74–59	106–67
3	Syria	6	2	4	396	470	−74	**8**	Second round	52–73	48–100	—	91–81
4	Iraq	6	0	6	416	563	−147	**6**		71–86	59–108	70–78	—

Source: FIBA
Rules for classification: 1) Points; 2) Head-to-head results; 3) Points difference; 4) Points scored.

===== Group D =====
Pos	Team	Pld	W	L	PF	PA	PD	Pts	Qualification	(Lebanon)	(Qatar)	(Saudi Arabia)	(India)
1	Lebanon	6	5	1	537	434	+103	**11**	Second round	—	83–86	94–64	99–56
2	Qatar	6	4	2	480	446	+34	**10**	Second round as host of the final tournament	74–75	—	80–86	99–73
3	Saudi Arabia	6	3	3	461	446	+15	**9**	Second round	82–88	73–76	—	75–51
4	India	6	0	6	365	517	−152	**6**		72–98	56–65	57–81	—

Source: FIBA
Rules for classification: 1) Points; 2) Head-to-head results; 3) Points difference; 4) Points scored.

==== Second round ====
===== Group E =====
Pos	Team	Pld	W	L	PF	PA	PD	Pts	Qualification	(Australia)	(New Zealand)	(Iran)	(Jordan)	(Philippines)	(Syria)
1	Australia	8	8	0	814	560	+254	16	2027 FIBA Basketball World Cup	—	84–79	28 Feb	126–93	92–49	25 Feb
2	New Zealand	8	6	2	778	638	+140	14	2027 FIBA Basketball World Cup	77–79	—	25 Feb	28 Feb	106–102 (2OT)	126–74
3	Iran	8	5	3	599	542	+57	13 (Note: Iran 127–122 Jordan)	2027 FIBA Basketball World Cup	27 Nov	91–93 (OT)	—	60–73	30 Nov	72–68
4	Jordan	8	5	3	684	568	+116	13	Best fourth placed team	30 Nov	27 Nov	49–67	—	81–82 (OT)	74–59
5	Philippines	8	4	4	615	614	+1	12		66–93	66–69	68–56	25 Feb	—	28 Feb
6	Syria	8	2	6	534	719	−185	10		64–123	30 Nov	52–73	48–100	27 Nov	—

Updated to game(s) played on 30 August 2026. Source: FIBA
Rules for classification: 1) Points; 2) Head-to-head results; 3) Points difference; 4) Points scored.

===== Group F =====
Pos	Team	Pld	W	L	PF	PA	PD	Pts	Qualification	(Japan)	(Lebanon)	(China)	(South Korea)	(Qatar)	(Saudi Arabia)
1	Japan	8	6	2	728	598	+130	14	2027 FIBA Basketball World Cup	—	1 Mar	80–87	78–72	123-70	26 Feb
2	Lebanon	8	6	2	717	597	+120	14	2027 FIBA Basketball World Cup	26 Nov	—	29 Nov	93–74	83–86	94–64
3	China	8	5	3	676	653	+23	13	2027 FIBA Basketball World Cup	73–92	89–87	—	76–80	26 Feb	1 Mar
4	South Korea	8	4	4	627	633	−6	12	Best fourth placed team	81–79	26 Feb	90–76	—	1 Mar	85–72
5	Qatar	8	4	4	607	652	−45	12	2027 FIBA Basketball World Cup as hosts	29 Nov	74–75	57–83	26 Nov	—	80–86
6	Saudi Arabia	8	3	5	611	637	−26	11		78–106	82–88	26 Nov	29 Nov	73–76	—

Updated to game(s) played on 31 August 2026. Source: FIBA
Rules for classification: 1) Points; 2) Head-to-head results; 3) Points difference; 4) Points scored.

=== FIBA Europe ===
The 32 teams participated in the European qualifiers consist of 24 teams from the EuroBasket 2025 and eight teams from the European pre-qualifiers. Due to the Russian invasion of Ukraine, both Russia and Belarus have been disqualified.

==== Pre-qualifiers ====
===== First round =====
====== Group A ======
Pos	Team	Pld	W	L	PF	PA	PD	Pts	Qualification	(Switzerland)	(Republic of Ireland)	(Kosovo)	(Azerbaijan)
1	Switzerland	6	6	0	484	341	+143	**12**	Second round	—	85–54	75–43	72–53
2	Ireland	6	3	3	454	470	−16	**9**		63–86	—	91–85	91–67
3	Kosovo	6	2	4	442	489	−47	**8**		73–81	83–76	—	81–79
4	Azerbaijan	6	1	5	405	485	−80	**7**		55–85	64–79	87–77	—

Source: FIBA
Rules for classification: 1) Points; 2) Head-to-head; 3) Points difference; 4) Points scored.

====== Group B ======
Pos	Team	Pld	W	L	PF	PA	PD	Pts	Qualification	(Romania)	(Norway)	(Luxembourg)
1	Romania	4	3	1	316	287	+29	**7**	Second round	—	85–71	72–76 (OT)
2	Norway	4	2	2	273	277	−4	**6**	Second round	62–75	—	68–59
3	Luxembourg	4	1	3	271	296	−25	**5**		78–84	58–72	—

Source: FIBA
Rules for classification: 1) Points; 2) Head-to-head; 3) Points difference; 4) Points scored.

====== Group C ======
Pos	Team	Pld	W	L	PF	PA	PD	Pts	Qualification	(Austria)	(Armenia)	(Albania)
1	Austria	4	3	1	401	312	+89	**7**	Second round	—	106–91	67–78
2	Armenia	4	2	2	346	384	−38	**6**		80–129	—	84–79
3	Albania	4	1	3	290	341	−51	**5**		63–99	67–91	—

Source: FIBA
Rules for classification: 1) Points; 2) Head-to-head; 3) Points difference; 4) Points scored.

===== Second round =====
====== Group A ======
Pos	Team	Pld	W	L	PF	PA	PD	Pts	Qualification	(Ukraine)	(Switzerland)	(Slovakia)
1	Ukraine	4	3	1	315	287	+28	**7**	Qualifiers	—	73–64	80–71
2	Switzerland	4	2	2	275	282	−7	**6**	Qualifiers	66–64	—	85–72
3	Slovakia	4	1	3	302	323	−21	**5**		86–98	73–60	—

Source: FIBA
Rules for classification: 1) Points; 2) Head-to-head; 3) Points difference; 4) Points scored.

====== Group B ======
Pos	Team	Pld	W	L	PF	PA	PD	Pts	Qualification	(Romania)	(Hungary)	(North Macedonia)
1	Romania	4	3	1	235	202	+33	**7**	Qualifiers	—	76–64	79–66
2	Hungary	4	2	2	235	216	+19	**6**	Qualifiers	86–66	—	96–58
3	North Macedonia	4	1	3	278	330	−52	**5**		72–80	82–75	—

Source: FIBA
Rules for classification: 1) Points; 2) Head-to-head; 3) Points difference; 4) Points scored.

====== Group C ======
Pos	Team	Pld	W	L	PF	PA	PD	Pts	Qualification	(Netherlands)	(Austria)	(Bulgaria)
1	Netherlands	4	3	1	313	287	+26	**7**	Qualifiers	—	65–64	97–70
2	Austria	4	2	2	313	298	+15	**6**	Qualifiers	83–70	—	88–76
3	Bulgaria	4	1	3	303	344	−41	**5**		70–81	87–78	—

Source: FIBA
Rules for classification: 1) Points; 2) Head-to-head; 3) Points difference; 4) Points scored.

====== Group D ======
Pos	Team	Pld	W	L	PF	PA	PD	Pts	Qualification	(Croatia)	(Denmark)	(Norway)
1	Croatia	4	4	0	379	271	+108	**8**	Qualifiers	—	100–71	102–53
2	Denmark	4	2	2	318	317	+1	**6**	Qualifiers	76–79	—	89–71
3	Norway	4	0	4	262	371	−109	**4**		68–101	70–79	—

Source: FIBA
Rules for classification: 1) Points; 2) Head-to-head; 3) Points difference; 4) Points scored.

==== Qualifiers ====
===== First round =====
====== Group A ======
Pos	Team	Pld	W	L	PF	PA	PD	Pts	Qualification	(Spain)	(Ukraine)	(Georgia (country))	(Denmark)
1	Spain	6	5	1	526	427	+99	**11**	Second round	—	78–64	90–61	109–81
2	Ukraine	6	4	2	504	459	+45	**10**	Second round	66–86	—	95–76	88–71
3	Georgia	6	3	3	485	497	−12	**9**	Second round	91–89	79–92	—	89–60
4	Denmark	6	0	6	416	548	−132	**6**		64–74	69–99	71–89	—

Source: FIBA
Rules for classification: 1) Points; 2) Head-to-head results; 3) Points difference; 4) Points scored.

====== Group B ======
Pos	Team	Pld	W	L	PF	PA	PD	Pts	Qualification	(Montenegro)	(Portugal)	(Greece)	(Romania)
1	Montenegro	6	4	2	411	434	−23	**10**	Second round	—	62–83	65–79	65–64
2	Portugal	6	3	3	485	449	+36	**9 (Note: Portugal 139–132 Greece)**	Second round	68–72	—	68–76	99–82
3	Greece	6	3	3	433	408	+25	**9**	Second round	65–67	56–71	—	91–64
4	Romania	6	2	4	459	497	−38	**8**		75–80	101–96	73–66	—

Source: FIBA
Rules for classification: 1) Points; 2) Head-to-head results; 3) Points difference; 4) Points scored.

====== Group C ======
Pos	Team	Pld	W	L	PF	PA	PD	Pts	Qualification	(Turkey)	(Serbia)	(Bosnia and Herzegovina)	(Switzerland)
1	Turkey	6	6	0	531	442	+89	**12**	Second round	—	94–86	93–71	95–72
2	Serbia	6	4	2	519	488	+31	**10**	Second round	78–82	—	94–81	90–86
3	Bosnia and Herzegovina	6	2	4	474	463	+11	**8**	Second round	75–82	72–74	—	84–60
4	Switzerland	6	0	6	411	542	−131	**6**		60–85	73–97	60–91	—

Source: FIBA
Rules for classification: 1) Points; 2) Head-to-head results; 3) Points difference; 4) Points scored.

====== Group D ======
Pos	Team	Pld	W	L	PF	PA	PD	Pts	Qualification	(Italy)	(Lithuania)	(Iceland)	(United Kingdom)
1	Italy	6	5	1	524	461	+63	**11**	Second round	—	87–84	76–81	84–75
2	Lithuania	6	3	3	543	510	+33	**9 (Note: Lithuania 184–168 Iceland)**	Second round	81–82	—	99–82	105–85
3	Iceland	6	3	3	504	538	−34	**9**	Second round	83–102	86–85	—	84–90
4	Great Britain	6	1	5	481	543	−62	**7**		57–93	88–89	86–88	—

Source: FIBA
Rules for classification: 1) Points; 2) Head-to-head results; 3) Points difference; 4) Points scored.

====== Group E ======
Pos	Team	Pld	W	L	PF	PA	PD	Pts	Qualification	(Croatia)	(Germany)	(Israel)	(Cyprus)
1	Croatia	6	5	1	593	435	+158	**11 (Note: Croatia 182–179 Germany)**	Second round	—	93–88	103–75	100–60
2	Germany	6	5	1	554	480	+74	**11**	Second round	91–89 (OT)	—	89–69	111–79
3	Israel	6	2	4	478	477	+1	**8**	Second round	71–85	68–92	—	94–54
4	Cyprus	6	0	6	361	594	−233	**6**		50–123	64–83	54–83	—

Source: FIBA
Rules for classification: 1) Points; 2) Head-to-head results; 3) Points difference; 4) Points scored.

====== Group F ======
Pos	Team	Pld	W	L	PF	PA	PD	Pts	Qualification	(Poland)	(Latvia)	(Netherlands)	(Austria)
1	Poland	6	6	0	566	476	+90	**12**	Second round	—	92–72	92–84	90–78
2	Latvia	6	3	3	502	465	+37	**9**	Second round	82–84	—	78–86	112–66
3	Netherlands	6	2	4	490	486	+4	**8**	Second round	83–85	69–72	—	87–88
4	Austria	6	1	5	448	579	−131	**7**		77–123	68–86	71–81	—

Source: FIBA
Rules for classification: 1) Points; 2) Head-to-head results; 3) Points difference; 4) Points scored.

====== Group G ======
Pos	Team	Pld	W	L	PF	PA	PD	Pts	Qualification	(France)	(Finland)	(Hungary)	(Belgium)
1	France	6	5	1	505	437	+68	**11**	Second round	—	98–69	98–79	79–63
2	Finland	6	4	2	468	481	−13	**10**	Second round	83–76	—	85–77	78–75
3	Hungary	6	3	3	488	494	−6	**9**	Second round	71–74	89–82	—	85–70
4	Belgium	6	0	6	431	480	−49	**6**		72–80	66–71	85–87	—

Source: FIBA
Rules for classification: 1) Points; 2) Head-to-head results; 3) Points difference; 4) Points scored.

====== Group H ======
Pos	Team	Pld	W	L	PF	PA	PD	Pts	Qualification	(Estonia)	(Slovenia)	(Sweden)	(Czech Republic)
1	Estonia	6	3	3	509	483	+26	**9**	Second round	—	93–62	69–79	92–97
2	Slovenia	6	3	3	513	501	+12	**9**	Second round	93–94 (OT)	—	79–88	99–59
3	Sweden	6	3	3	494	503	−9	**9**	Second round	77–88	83–94	—	87–76
4	Czechia	6	3	3	488	517	−29	**9**		75–73	84–86	97–80	—

Source: FIBA
Rules for classification: 1) Points; 2) Head-to-head results; 3) Points difference; 4) Points scored.

==== Second round ====
===== Group I =====
Pos	Team	Pld	W	L	PF	PA	PD	Pts	Qualification	(Ukraine)	(Spain)	(Georgia (country))	(Portugal)	(Greece)	(Montenegro)
1	Ukraine	8	6	2	684	624	+60	14	2027 FIBA Basketball World Cup	—	66–86	95–76	1 Mar	82–76	29 Nov
2	Spain	8	5	3	721	630	+91	13	2027 FIBA Basketball World Cup	78–64	—	90–61	89–95	29 Nov	1 Mar
3	Georgia	8	5	3	684	661	+23	13	2027 FIBA Basketball World Cup	79–92	91–89 (OT)	—	29 Nov	1 Mar	101–74
4	Portugal	8	4	4	670	636	+34	12		26 Nov	26 Feb	90–98	—	68–76	68–72
5	Greece	8	4	4	617	596	+21	12		26 Feb	108-106	26 Nov	56–71	—	65–67
6	Montenegro	8	4	4	574	633	−59	12		89–98	26 Nov	26 Feb	62–83	65–79	—

Updated to game(s) played on 31 August 2026. Source: FIBA
Rules for classification: 1) Points; 2) Head-to-head results; 3) Points difference; 4) Points scored.

===== Group J =====
Pos	Team	Pld	W	L	PF	PA	PD	Pts	Qualification	(Turkey)	(Serbia)	(Italy)	(Lithuania)	(Bosnia and Herzegovina)	(Iceland)
1	Turkey (A)	8	8	0	735	581	+154	16	2027 FIBA Basketball World Cup	—	94–86	1 Mar	94–66	93–71	29 Nov
2	Serbia	8	6	2	697	625	+72	14	2027 FIBA Basketball World Cup	78–82	—	29 Nov	1 Mar	94–81	102–73
3	Italy	8	5	3	664	615	+49	13	2027 FIBA Basketball World Cup	26 Nov	64–76	—	87–84	26 Feb	76–81
4	Lithuania	8	4	4	687	677	+10	12		26 Feb	26 Nov	81–82	—	78–73	99–82
5	Bosnia and Herzegovina	8	3	5	625	617	+8	11		75–82	72–74	78–76	29 Nov	—	1 Mar
6	Iceland	8	3	5	650	750	−100	11		73–110	26 Feb	83–102	86–85	26 Nov	—

Updated to game(s) played on 31 August 2026. Source: FIBA
Rules for classification: 1) Points; 2) Head-to-head results; 3) Points difference; 4) Points scored.
(A) Advance to a further round

===== Group K =====
Pos	Team	Pld	W	L	PF	PA	PD	Pts	Qualification	(Croatia)	(Poland)	(Germany)	(Latvia)	(Netherlands)	(Israel)
1	Croatia	8	7	1	809	614	+195	15	2027 FIBA Basketball World Cup	—	28 Feb	93–88	115–80	30 Nov	103–75
2	Poland	8	7	1	766	658	+108	15	2027 FIBA Basketball World Cup	27 Nov	—	94–96 (OT)	92–72	92–84	25 Feb
3	Germany	8	7	1	749	657	+92	15	2027 FIBA Basketball World Cup	91–89 (OT)	30 Nov	—	28 Feb	99–83	89–69
4	Latvia	8	4	4	667	650	+17	12		25 Feb	82–84	27 Nov	—	78–86	85–70
5	Netherlands (E)	8	2	6	672	686	−14	10		99–101	83–85	25 Feb	69–72	—	27 Nov
6	Israel (E)	8	2	6	634	668	−34	10		71–85	86–106	68–92	30 Nov	28 Feb	—

Updated to game(s) played on 30 August 2026. Source: FIBA
Rules for classification: 1) Points; 2) Head-to-head results; 3) Points difference; 4) Points scored.
(E) Eliminated

===== Group L =====
Pos	Team	Pld	W	L	PF	PA	PD	Pts	Qualification	(France)	(Finland)	(Slovenia)	(Hungary)	(Sweden)	(Estonia)
1	France	8	7	1	681	573	+108	15	2027 FIBA Basketball World Cup	—	98–69	92–67	98–79	30 Nov	28 Feb
2	Finland	8	5	3	645	634	+11	13	2027 FIBA Basketball World Cup	83–76	—	28 Feb	85–77	81–86	30 Nov
3	Slovenia	8	4	4	672	670	+2	12	2027 FIBA Basketball World Cup	25 Feb	27 Nov	—	92–77	79–88	93–94 (OT)
4	Hungary	8	4	4	650	653	−3	12		71–74	89–82	30 Nov	—	28 Feb	85–67
5	Sweden	8	4	4	649	668	−19	12		69–84	25 Feb	83–94	27 Nov	—	77–88
6	Estonia	8	3	5	643	664	−21	11		27 Nov	67–96	93–62	25 Feb	69–79	—

Updated to game(s) played on 30 August 2026. Source: FIBA
Rules for classification: 1) Points; 2) Head-to-head results; 3) Points difference; 4) Points scored.
