= Both Gach =

South Sudanese-American basketball player (born 1999)

- Gach with ASVEL in 2026

No. 14 – ASVEL
- Position: Small forward
- League: LNB Élite; EuroLeague

Personal information
- Born: February 4, 1999 (age 27) Austin, Minnesota, U.S.
- Listed height: 2.01 m (6 ft 7 in)
- Listed weight: 100 kg (220 lb)

Career information
- High school: Austin (Austin, Minnesota); AZ Compass Prep (Chandler, Arizona)
- College: Utah (2018–2020); Minnesota (2020–2021); Utah (2021–2022)
- NBA draft: 2022: undrafted
- Playing career: 2022–present

Career history
- 2023: Sigal Prishtina
- 2023–2024: BC Nokia
- 2024–2025: Darüşşafaka
- 2025–2026: JL Bourg
- 2026–present: ASVEL

Career highlights
- EuroCup champion (2026); All-EuroCup Second Team (2026); Finnish League champion (2024); Finnish League MVP (2024); Finnish League Finals MVP (2024)

Both Tut Gach (born February 4, 1999) is a South Sudanese and American professional basketball player for ASVEL of the French LNB Élite and the EuroLeague. Standing at 6 ft 7 in (2.01 m), Gach plays as a small forward. He played college basketball for the Utah Utes and Minnesota Golden Gophers.

== Early life and youth career ==
Born in Austin, Minnesota, Gach grew up in the United States after his family fled South Sudan in 1996 due to the Second Sudanese Civil War. Gach has six siblings, including a twin brother.

Gach attended and played high school basketball for Austin High School in his hometown between 2014 and 2017. He went on to play for AZ Compass Prep School in Chandler, Arizona.

== College career ==
Gach's college basketball career started with Utah in the Big 12 Conference, between 2018 and 2020. As a sophomore, he was the team's second top scorer, averaging 10.7 points per game.

Gach went on to play for Minnesota in the Big Ten Conference for a season.

Gach played an additional season of college basketball after returning to Utah, recording a season-high 21 points in 29 games played.

== Professional career ==
After finishing his college career, Gach signed his first professional contract with Sigal Prishtina of the Kosovo Basketball Superleague in December 2022. In September 2023, Gach signed for BC Nokia of the Finnish Korisliiga.

On June 26, 2024, Gach signed for Darüşşafaka of the Turkish Basketbol Süper Ligi (BSL).

On June 30, 2025, Gach signed for JL Bourg of the French LNB Élite and the EuroCup. Gach experienced a breakthrough season with Bourg, becoming a key player for the team and ultimately helping the French side conquer their first EuroCup title. Gach was also named to the All-EuroCup Second Team.

On July 4, 2026, Gach signed with ASVEL Villeurbanne of the LNB Élite of the EuroLeague.

== National team career ==
Gach has represented the South Sudan national team internationally, taking part in qualifier games for the 2027 FIBA Basketball World Cup.

== Career statistics ==
Legend
GP	Games played	GS	Games started	MPG	Minutes per game
FG%	Field goal percentage	3P%	3-point field goal percentage	FT%	Free throw percentage
RPG	Rebounds per game	APG	Assists per game	SPG	Steals per game
BPG	Blocks per game	PPG	Points per game	**Bold**	Career high

=== College ===
Year	Team	GP	GS	MPG	FG%	3P%	FT%	RPG	APG	SPG	BPG	PPG
2018–19	Utah	**30**	14	20.1	**.472**	**.316**	**.857**	2.1	2.1	.5	.1	7.7
2019–20	Utah	27	**25**	**30.4**	.397	.250	.775	3.6	**2.9**	**.7**	.1	**10.7**
2020–21	Minnesota	29	16	22.7	.401	.276	.808	**3.7**	1.9	.6	.1	6.8
2021–22	Utah	**30**	9	23.7	.415	.295	.803	2.6	2.2	**.7**	**.2**	8.7
Career		116	64	24.0	.418	.282	.808	2.9	2.3	.6	.1	8.4
