= Basketball at the 2028 Summer Olympics – Men's qualification =

The men's qualification for the Olympic basketball tournament will occur between 2027 and 2028; all five FIBA (International Basketball Federation) zones are expected to have a representation in the Olympic basketball event.

As the host nation, the United States reserves a quota place in the men's 5×5 basketball. The 2027 FIBA Basketball World Cup will produce seven directly qualified national teams for the tournament. The sixteen highest-ranked teams from the World Cup (except those directly qualified), five from the pre-qualifying tournaments, and one each from Africa, the Americas, and Asia and Oceania will participate in four separate wild card tournaments with the winner of each receiving a slot in the 12-team field.

== Qualification via World Cup ==
Similar to the 2024 format, the 2027 FIBA Basketball World Cup will distribute seven quota places to the best teams from respective continents based on the final classification as follows:

- FIBA Africa – 1 team
- FIBA Americas – 2 teams
- FIBA Asia – 1 team
- FIBA Europe – 2 teams
- FIBA Oceania – 1 team

== Qualification via the qualifying tournament ==
The four remaining quota places are attributed to the 12-team field through the 2028 FIBA Olympic Qualifying Tournaments, composed of six teams each, twenty-four overall. The tournament will be contested by the top sixteen teams eligible for qualification and the three next highest-ranked from Africa, the Americas, and Asia and Oceania. The FIBA Olympic Pre-Qualifying Tournaments (FPOQTs) to be staged at the continental level will produce five teams to complete the lineup.

- Top 16 teams vying for qualification – 2027 FIBA Basketball World Cup (irrespective of continent)
- FIBA Africa – the highest-ranked team at the World Cup vying for qualification; the highest-ranked team from FPOQTs
- FIBA Americas – the highest-ranked team at the World Cup vying for qualification; the highest-ranked team from FPOQTs
- FIBA Asia or FIBA Oceania – the highest-ranked team at the World Cup vying for qualification; the highest-ranked team from FPOQTs
- FIBA Europe – two highest-ranked teams from FPOQTs

== Qualified teams ==
| Qualification method | | Date | Venue | Berths | Qualified team |
|---|---|---|---|---|---|
| Host nation | | —N/a | —N/a | 1 | United States |
| 2027 FIBA Basketball World Cup | Africa | 27 August – 12 September 2027 | (Qatar) Doha/ Lusail | 1 | |
| 2027 FIBA Basketball World Cup | Americas | 27 August – 12 September 2027 | (Qatar) Doha/ Lusail | 2 | |
| 2027 FIBA Basketball World Cup | Asia | 27 August – 12 September 2027 | (Qatar) Doha/ Lusail | 1 | |
| 2027 FIBA Basketball World Cup | Europe | 27 August – 12 September 2027 | (Qatar) Doha/ Lusail | 2 | |
| 2027 FIBA Basketball World Cup | Oceania | 27 August – 12 September 2027 | (Qatar) Doha/ Lusail | 1 | |
| 2028 FIBA Men's Olympic Qualifying Tournaments | | 26 June – 2 July 2028 | TBA | 1 | |
| 2028 FIBA Men's Olympic Qualifying Tournaments | | 26 June – 2 July 2028 | TBA | 1 | |
| 2028 FIBA Men's Olympic Qualifying Tournaments | | 26 June – 2 July 2028 | TBA | 1 | |
| 2028 FIBA Men's Olympic Qualifying Tournaments | | 26 June – 2 July 2028 | TBA | 1 | |
| Total | | | | 12 | |
