= Kur Kuath =

South Sudanese-American basketball player (born 1998)

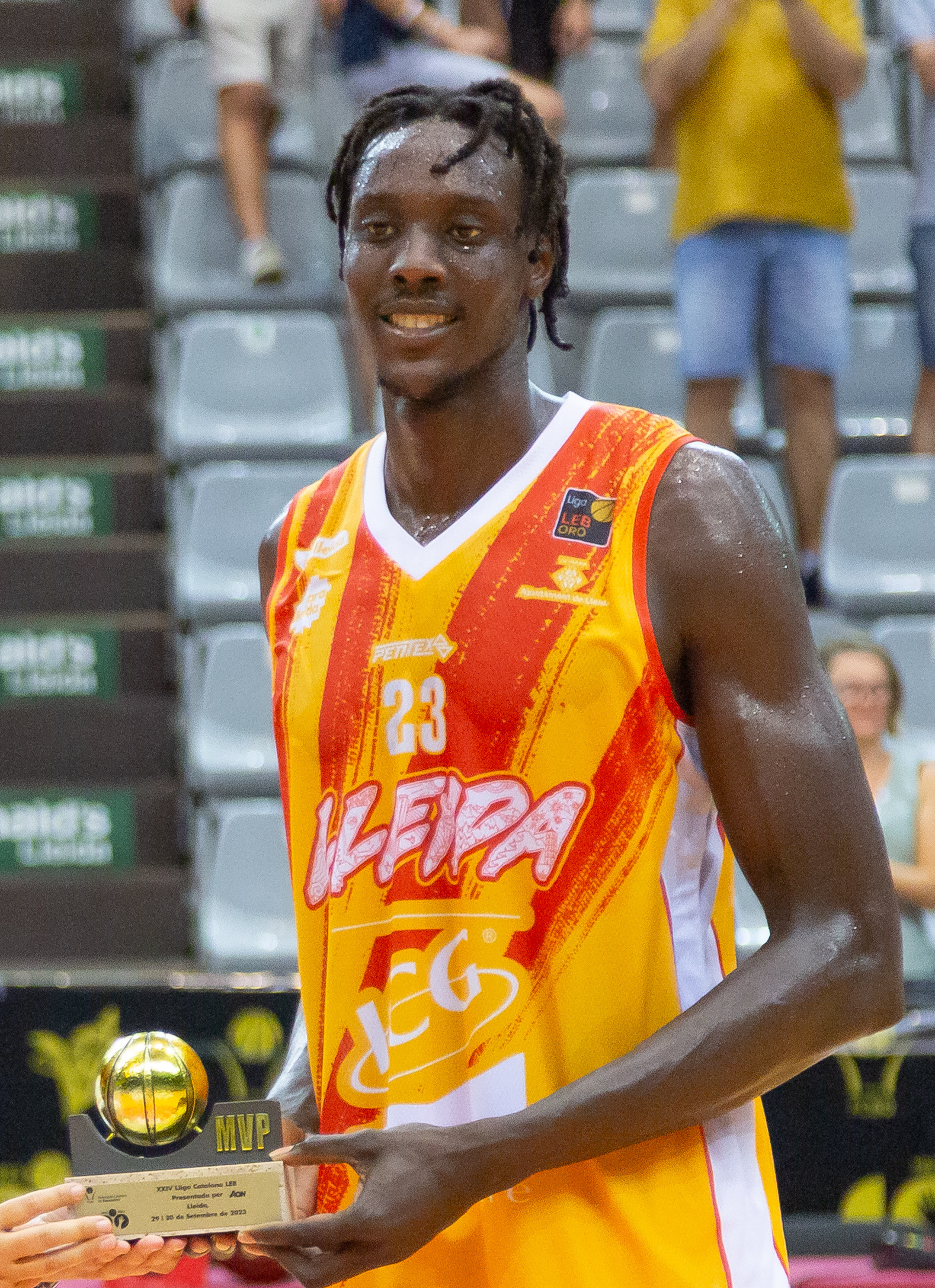
- Kuath with Força Lleida in 2023

No. 23 – Força Lleida
- Position: Center
- League: Liga ACB

Personal information
- Born: August 12, 1998 (age 28) Khartoum, Sudan
- Listed height: 2.08 m (6 ft 10 in)
- Listed weight: 100 kg (220 lb)

Career information
- High school: Kearns (Kearns, Utah)
- College: Oklahoma (2018–2021); Marquette (2021–2022)
- NBA draft: 2022: undrafted
- Playing career: 2022–present

Career history
- 2022–2023: Lavrio
- 2023: Ourense
- 2023–2024: Força Lleida
- 2024–2025: Hamburg Towers
- 2025–2026: Gran Canaria
- 2026–present: Força Lleida

Kur Nyok Kuath (born August 12, 1998) is a South Sudanese-American professional basketball player who plays for Força Lleida of the Spanish Liga ACB. Standing at 6 ft 10 in (2.08 m), Kuath plays as a center.

== Early life and youth career ==
Born in Khartoum, Sudan, Kuath fled to Egypt with his family as a child due to the Sudanese civil war. They would eventually move to the United States as refugees and settle in Utah, where Kuath grew up and started playing basketball.

Kuath attended and played high school basketball for Kearns High School in Kearns, Utah.

== College career ==
Kuath's college basketball career started with Salt Lake Community College in the National Junior College Athletic Association, between 2016 and 2018.

He went on to play for the Oklahoma Sooners in the NCAA. In three seasons, he played 63 games, averaging 3.9 points per game.

Kuath played an additional season of college basketball with Marquette, averaging 5.6 points per game over 32 games.

== Professional career ==
After finishing his college career, Kuath signed his first professional contract with Lavrio of the Greek Basketball League in July 2022. In January 2023, Kuath signed for Ourense of the Spanish LEB Oro.

In August 2023, Kuath signed for another LEB Oro team, Força Lleida. Kuath helped Lleida achieve promotion to the Liga ACB in the 2023–24 LEB Oro Playoffs. He won the MVP award in the Final Four held in Madrid in June 2024.

On June 25, 2024, Kuath signed for Hamburg Towers of the Basketball Bundesliga and the EuroCup. Kuath recorded successful performances in the EuroCup, managing to become the second player in the competition's history to record at least 10 rebounds, 5 assists and 5 blocked shots in a game in November 2024.

On July 5, 2025, Kuath signed a two-season contract with CB Gran Canaria of the Liga ACB and the Basketball Champions League. Recording 22 points and 9 rebounds in a February 2026 win over Covirán Granada, he was the round 20 MVP of the 2025–26 ACB season.

On August 3, 2026, Kuath returned to Força Lleida of the Liga ACB, signing a one-season deal.

== National team career ==
Kuath has represented the South Sudan national team internationally, taking part in the FIBA AfroBasket 2025 and the tournament's previous qualifier games. He has also represented his country in 2027 FIBA Basketball World Cup qualification games.
