= Moustafa Diop =

Senegalese basketball player (born 1951)

Personal information
- Nationality: Senegalese
- Born: 7 September 1951 (age 73)

Sport
- Sport: Basketball

Mohamadou Moustafa Diop (born 7 September 1951) is a Senegalese basketball player. He competed in the men's tournament at the 1972 Summer Olympics and the 1980 Summer Olympics.
