= Mbaye Ndiaye (basketball) =

Senegalese basketball player (born 1999)

- Ndiaye with Olympiacos in 2026

No. 24 – Olympiacos
- Position: Power forward / small forward
- League: Greek Basketball League; EuroLeague

Personal information
- Born: January 4, 1999 (age 27) Thiès, Senegal
- Listed height: 2.03 m (6 ft 8 in)
- Listed weight: 92 kg (203 lb)

Career information
- NBA draft: 2021: undrafted
- Playing career: 2017–present

Career history
- 2017–2020: JL Bourg
- 2020–2023: ADA Blois Basket
- 2023–2026: ASVEL
- 2026–present: Olympiacos

Career highlights
- Greek Super Cup winner (2026)

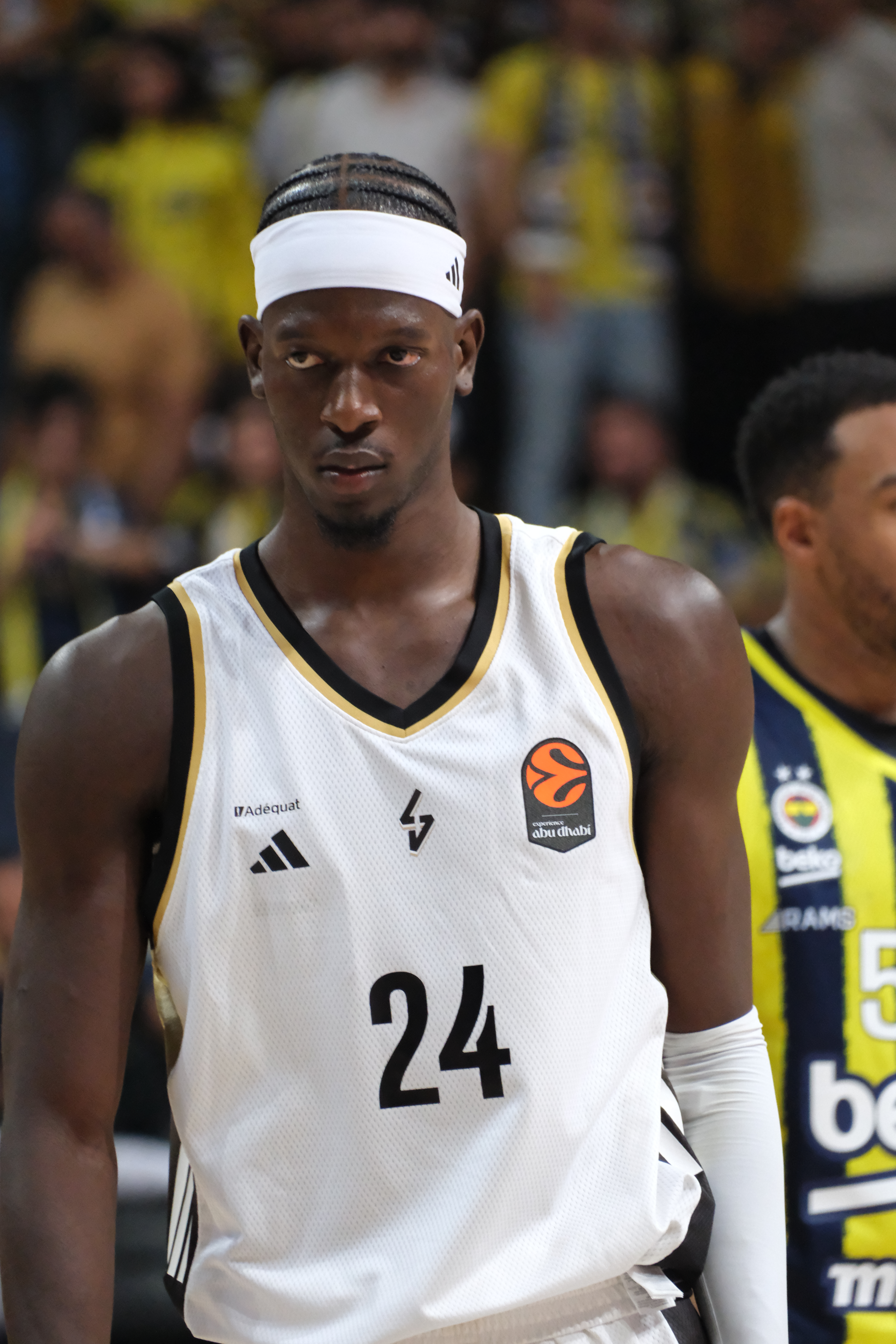
Ndiaye with ASVEL Basket in 2025

Mbaye Ndiaye (born January 4, 1999) is a Senegalese professional basketball player for Olympiacos of the Greek Basketball League (GBL) and the EuroLeague. He has also represented Senegal at the international level. Standing at a height of 2.03 m (6 ft 8 in), Ndiaye primarily plays as a power forward.

== Early life and youth career ==
Ndiaye was born in Thiès, Senegal. He started playing basketball in the youth ranks of his hometown team, US Rail. In 2017, he took part in the Gorgui Dieng Basketball Camp held in Senegal, in which he was named MVP. At the camp, he was scouted by French-Senegalese basketball agent Bouna Ndiaye. In 2017, he joined the youth ranks of French club JL Bourg.

== Professional career ==
Ndiaye played mainly with Espoirs, JL Bourg's youth team in his first two seasons at the club, occasionally playing with the first team. He would sign his first professional contract in 2019, making his way to the senior team.

In June 2020, Ndiaye signed with ADA Blois Basket of the Pro B, the second tier of French basketball. While at Blois, he took part in the 2022 NBA Summer League with the Denver Nuggets.

=== ASVEL (2023–2026) ===
On June 16, 2023, LDLC ASVEL of the French LNB Élite and the EuroLeague announced Ndiaye as a new player. On December 17, 2024, Ndiaye was injured in a EuroLeague game against Partizan. He ruptured the cruciate ligaments in his right knee, which kept him off the court for several months.

=== Olympiacos (2026–present) ===
On August 13, 2026, Ndiaye signed a two–year deal with Olympiacos of the Greek Basketball League (GBL) and the EuroLeague.

== National team career ==
Ndiaye has represented Senegal at the senior level, taking part in qualification games for the AfroBasket 2021 and the 2023 FIBA Basketball World Cup.

== Career statistics ==
Legend
GP	Games played	GS	Games started	MPG	Minutes per game
FG%	Field goal percentage	3P%	3-point field goal percentage	FT%	Free throw percentage
RPG	Rebounds per game	APG	Assists per game	SPG	Steals per game
BPG	Blocks per game	PPG	Points per game	**Bold**	Career high

=== EuroLeague ===
Year	Team	GP	GS	MPG	FG%	3P%	FT%	RPG	APG	SPG	BPG	PPG	PIR
2023–24	ASVEL	**22**	1	15.8	.507	.182	.538	**3.9**	**1.0**	.5	**.9**	3.6	6.3
2024–25	ASVEL	14	**5**	**19.6**	**.528**	**.406**	**.667**	2.9	.8	**.6**	.6	**7.2**	**7.0**

=== Domestic leagues ===
Year	Team	League	GP	MPG	FG%	3P%	FT%	RPG	APG	SPG	BPG	PPG
2023–24	(France) ASVEL	LNB	29	17.1	.589	.292	.647	3.8	1.0	.7	1.0	5.6
2024–25	(France) ASVEL	LNB	10	19.9	.588	.348	.667	4.2	1.3	.6	.8	8.0
