= Souley Boum =

American basketball player

No. 0 – UCAM Murcia
- Position: Point guard / shooting guard
- League: Liga ACB

Personal information
- Born: January 26, 1999 (age 27) Oakland, California, U.S.
- Listed height: 6 ft 3 in (1.91 m)
- Listed weight: 175 lb (79 kg)

Career information
- High school: Oakland Tech (Oakland, California)
- College: San Francisco (2017–2018); UTEP (2019–2022); Xavier (2022–2023)
- NBA draft: 2023: undrafted
- Playing career: 2023–present

Career history
- 2023–2024: Grand Rapids Gold
- 2024: MKS Dąbrowa Górnicza
- 2024–2025: Limoges CSP
- 2025–2026: BC Vienna
- 2026–present: UCAM Murcia

Career highlights
- First-team All-Big East (2023); Second-team All-Conference USA (2022); Third-team All-Conference USA (2021); WCC All-Freshman team (2018)
- Stats at NBA.com
- Stats at Basketball Reference

Souleymane Boum (born January 26, 1999) is an American professional basketball player for UCAM Murcia of the Liga ACB. He played college basketball for the San Francisco Dons, UTEP Miners and Xavier Musketeers.

== High school and college career ==
Boum starred at Oakland Technical High School, where he was twice named Oakland Athletic League player of the year. His success in high school and on the AAU circuit led to a scholarship offer from the nearby University of San Francisco, where he quickly earned a starting spot and was named to the West Coast Conference All-Freshman team. Following the season, he transferred to UTEP. In three seasons at UTEP, Boum proved an effective scorer, averaging 16.9 points per game.

Boum then transferred to Xavier for the extra season of eligibility granted by the NCAA for players whose careers were affected by COVID-19. Boum moved to the point guard position and led the Musketeers to a second-place finish in the Big East Conference. He passed the 2,000 career point milestone on December 3, 2022, in a game against West Virginia. At the close of the regular season he was named first-team All-Big East.

== Professional career ==
After going undrafted in the 2023 NBA draft, Boum joined the Sacramento Kings for the 2023 NBA Summer League

On September 29, 2023, he signed with the Denver Nuggets. However, he was waived on October 13. On October 30, he joined the Grand Rapids Gold.

On July 27, 2024, Boum signed with MKS Dąbrowa Górnicza of the Polish Basketball League.

On November 18, 2024, he signed with Limoges CSP of the LNB Pro A.

On August 26, 2025, he signed with GGMT Vienna of the Austrian Basketball Superliga.

On July 18, 2026, he signed with UCAM Murcia of the Liga ACB.

== Personal life ==
Boum is of Guinean descent, born after his mother emigrated to the United States.
