= South Sudan men's national basketball team =

Men's national basketball team representing South Sudan

South Sudan
- FIBA ranking: 25 ▼1 (3 March 2026)
- Joined FIBA: 2013
- FIBA zone: FIBA Africa
- National federation: SSBF
- Coach: Luol Deng
- Nickname: Bright Stars

Olympic Games
- Appearances: 1

FIBA World Cup
- Appearances: 1

Afrobasket
- Appearances: 2
Home	Away

First international
- Unofficial; Power 86–84 South Sudan (Juba, South Sudan; 13 July 2011); Official; Egypt 87–76 South Sudan (Cairo, Egypt; 12 March 2017)

Biggest win
- Libya 52–115 South Sudan (Moçâmedes, Angola; 14 August 2025)

Biggest defeat
- South Sudan 83–115 Serbia (Quezon City, Philippines; 30 August 2023)

The South Sudan men's national basketball team is the national basketball team representing South Sudan. It was established in May 2011, and became a member of FIBA on November 24th 2013. They are nicknamed the Bright Stars.

South Sudan has already played at two AfroBasket tournaments (2021, 2025), one FIBA World Cup (2023) and one Olympic Games (2024).

== History ==
=== 2011–19 ===
The team played its first unofficial match in Juba against Ugandan club champions Power on 13 July 2011. Power won the match 86–84.

In 2016, the team played in an exhibition tournament named Indigenous Basketball Competition in Vancouver, Canada.

On 9 January 2016, it was announced by the South Sudan Basketball Federation that Jerry Steele would become the new head coach of the men's national team for preparation of the 2017 AfroBasket competition. Through the agreement Steele would be under contract until the 2020 Tokyo Olympics.

In the 2017 AfroBasket qualifiers, the team was placed in Zone 5 Group A, with Egypt, Kenya, and Rwanda. South Sudan played its first official international game on 12 March 2017, against Egypt in Cairo. They would lose to Egypt by 11 points (87–76) in the first match on 12 March. Two days later the national team got its first victory in group stage against Kenya by 2 (68–66). The next day, the team relieved its next loss by ten (80–90) to Rwanda, later placing them in the Classification game. On 12 March, the team would beat Kenya in the Classification game in OT (84–89).

Coach Steele and the South Sudan Basketball Federation parted ways by mutual agreement on 3 October 2017.

On 7 November 2017, Scott Catt was appointed to be the new head coach of the men's national team by the South Sudan Basketball Federation. Madut Bol, son of the late Manute Bol, was also named as assistant head coach of the men's national team.

=== 2020–present ===
In November 2020, former NBA All-Star Luol Deng became the president of the SSBF. He also briefly coached the team. In September 2021, Royal Ivey, assistant coach with the Brooklyn Nets, became the head coach of the team. At AfroBasket 2021, South Sudan made its debut at a major tournament and reached the round of 16 after defeating Uganda and Cameroon in the preliminary round. In the round of 16, South Sudan beat Kenya, in the quarterfinals the team lost to defending champions Tunisia.

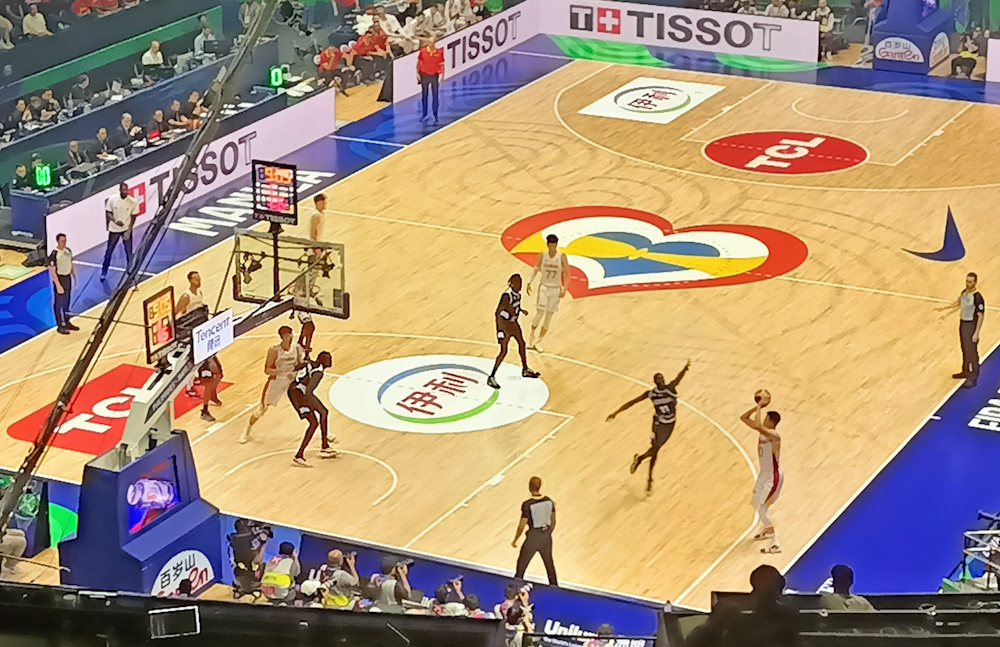
South Sudan (black) vs China (white) at the 2023 World Cup.

In the following 2023 FIBA World Cup qualification games, the Bright Stars impressed and had an unbeaten record in the first round (6–0), beating the defending African champions Tunisia twice and qualifying for their first World Cup in the third round with two games left. In the second round, again coached by Royal Ivey, they had another successful streak in order to qualify for South Sudan's first-ever World Cup in 2023.

On August 28, South Sudan earned its first World Cup victory with a dominant win over China in Quezon City, Philippines. South Sudan qualified for the 2024 Summer Olympics in Paris by finishing as the best African team in the World Cup, beating Angola in their final game to qualify for their first-ever Olympics.

In exhibition play leading up to the 2024 Paris Olympics, South Sudan played the United States and lost by just one point, 100–101, to a team led by four former NBA MVP winners, including LeBron James, Joel Embiid, Stephen Curry and Kevin Durant. Marial Shayok scored 25 points for South Sudan.

On the opening day of the Olympics, South Sudan stunned Puerto Rico for their first Olympic victory in the first game of group play, winning 90–79. Carlik Jones led the way with 19 points. The Bright Stars lost their two following games to the United States and Serbia, and thus did not advance past the preliminary stage.

== Competitive record ==
=== Olympic Games ===
Summer Olympic Games record
Year	Round	Position	GP	W	L
(Brazil) 2016	Did not enter				
(Japan) 2020	Did not enter				
(France) 2024	Preliminary round	9th	3	1	2
Total	Best: 9th		3	1	2

=== Record against other teams at the Olympics ===
Country	W–L
Puerto Rico	1–0
United States	0–1
Serbia	0–1
Total record	1–2
Overall historic score	261–278

Last updated: 1 August 2024

=== FIBA World Cup ===
FIBA Basketball World Cup record						Qualification record		
Year	Round	Position	GP	W	L	GP	W	L
(Spain) 2014	Did not enter					AfroBasket served as qualification		
(China) 2019	Did not enter					Did not enter		
(Philippines) (Japan) (Indonesia) 2023	Classification round	17th	5	3	2	12	11	1
(Qatar) 2027	To be determined					In progress		
(France) 2031	To be determined					To be determined		
Total	Classification round		5	3	2	12	11	1

=== FIBA AfroBasket ===
AfroBasket record						Qualification record		
Year	Round	Position	GP	W	L	GP	W	L
(Tunisia) 2015	Did not enter					Did not enter		
(Tunisia) (Senegal) 2017	Did not qualify					4	2	2
(Rwanda) 2021	Quarter-finals	7th	5	3	2	13	8	5
(Angola) 2025	Qualification to quarterfinals	10th	4	1	3	6	4	2
Total	Quarter-finals		9	4	5	23	14	9

== Team ==
=== Current roster ===
Roster as of the AfroBasket 2025.

South Sudan men's national basketball team roster
Players
Coaches

Pos.	No.	Name	Age – Date of birth	Height	Club	Ctr.
C	0	Jo Lual-Acuil	31 – 26 April 1994	2.13 m (7 ft 0 in)	Perth Wildcats	(Australia)
SF	1	Nuni Omot (C)	30 – 3 October 1994	2.06 m (6 ft 9 in)	APR BBC	(Rwanda)
PF	3	Emmanuel Akot	26 – 17 March 1999	2.01 m (6 ft 7 in)	Winnipeg Sea Bears	(Canada)
PG	4	Mareng Gatkuoth	25 – 10 September 1999	1.98 m (6 ft 6 in)	Pazi BBC	(Tanzania)
SF	7	Deng Deng	33 – 5 January 1992	2.03 m (6 ft 8 in)	Al Ittihad	(Egypt)
SG	8	Junior Madut	28 – 26 March 1997	1.98 m (6 ft 6 in)	Manchester Basketball	(England)
PG	10	Kendale McCullum	29 – 31 May 1996	1.85 m (6 ft 1 in)	Promitheas Patras B.C.	(Greece)
SG	11	Both Gach	26 – 4 February 1999	2.01 m (6 ft 7 in)	JL Bourg	(France)
PF	13	Majok Deng	32 – 1 March 1993	2.05 m (6 ft 9 in)	Tasmania JackJumpers	(Australia)
SG	14	Peter Jok	31 – 30 March 1994	1.98 m (6 ft 6 in)	Cibona	(Croatia)
PF	23	Kur Kuath	27 – 12 August 1998	2.08 m (6 ft 10 in)	CB Gran Canaria	(Spain)
PF	32	Wenyen Gabriel	28 – 26 March 1997	2.08 m (6 ft 10 in)	Bayern Munich	(Germany)

Head coach

- (South Sudan) / (United Kingdom) Luol Deng

Assistant coach(es)

- (South Sudan) Ajou Deng
- (United Kingdom) Dzaflo Larkai

Legend

- (C) Team captain
- Club – describes last
  club before the tournament
- Age – describes age
  on 12 August 2025

=== Head coaches ===
The following is a list of all head coaches of South Sudan:

Coach	Tenure	Major tournaments
(South Sudan) Deng Lek & Bil Duany	2011–2016	–
(United States) Jerry Steele	2016–2017	–
(United States) Scott Catt	2017–2020	–
(South Sudan) Ajou Deng	2020	–
(United Kingdom) Luol Deng	2020–2021; 2023	–
(United States) Royal Ivey	2021–present	2021 AfroBasket; 2023 World Cup; 2024 Summer Olympics; 2025 AfroBasket
