= 2027 FIBA Basketball World Cup =

International basketball competition

كأس العالم لكرة السلة 2027 Kaʾs al-ʿālam li-kurat al-salla 2027

Tournament details
- Host country: Qatar
- Dates: 27 August – 12 September
- Teams: 32 (from 4 confederations)
- Venues: 4 (in 4 (Note: For marketing purposes, all venues are considered as located in Doha, despite three of them being situated outside the city; one in Lusail, one in Al Rayyan and one in Al Wakrah.) host cities)

The 2027 FIBA Basketball World Cup will be the 20th FIBA Basketball World Cup, the quadrennial international basketball championship contested by the men's national teams of FIBA. The tournament will be hosted in Qatar from 27 August to 12 September 2027.

It will be the first FIBA Basketball World Cup to be held in the Arab world, and the third straight to be held in Asia, after the 2019 tournament in China, and the 2023 edition co-hosted by the Philippines, Japan, and Indonesia.

The tournament will serve as qualification for the 2028 Summer Olympics, where the top two teams from each of the Americas and Europe, and the top team from each of Africa, Asia, and Oceania, will qualify alongside the tournament's host the United States.

Germany will be the defending champions heading into the tournament, having beaten Serbia in the 2023 final.

== Host selection ==
During its Central Board meeting in Metro Manila, Philippines, on 28 April 2023, FIBA announced that Qatar will host the upcoming World Cup in 2027. According to the Associated Press, "Qatar ultimately was the lone bidder" for hosting the tournament. Given the criticism faced by Qatar on human rights issues around the 2022 FIFA World Cup, FIBA was asked about the subject, and replied that for this tournament there was no need for new construction, and that "time and cost savings from not building any new venues will be focused into delivering the strongest possible social legacy".

== Qualification ==
As hosts, Qatar earned an automatic qualification for the tournament when they were awarded the hosting rights. Qatar last played in the event at the 2006 World Championship, where it lost all five of its games.

80 teams from four FIBA zones will qualify for the World Cup qualifiers through qualification for the FIBA Continental Cups (AfroBasket 2025, 2025 FIBA AmeriCup, 2025 FIBA Asia Cup, and EuroBasket 2025). For Europe and the Americas, additional teams will qualify through the pre-qualifiers of the said regions. The participants of both the AfroBasket and the Asia Cup comprise the teams that will also take part in the qualifiers for their respective regions.

The first round of the Americas, Asia/Oceania, and Africa qualifiers will feature 16 teams each, whereas Europe will have 32 teams. Division A teams will be split into groups of four, to be held in a home-and-away round-robin. The top three teams in each group will advance to the second round. In round two of the World Cup qualifiers, teams will be split into six groups, totaling four groups in Europe and two in the other qualifiers. Teams carried over the points from round one, and faced the other three teams again in a home-and-away round-robin. The best teams in each group will qualify for the World Cup. No wild card selection will be held, and the Olympic champions will not be guaranteed a spot in the tournament.

Team	Qualification method	Date of qualification	Appearance(s)				Previous best performance (Note: Bold text indicates they hosted that edition.)	WR (Note: World ranking at start of tournament.)
Team	Qualification method	Date of qualification	Total	First	Last	Streak	Previous best performance	WR
Qatar	Host nation	28 April 2023	2nd	2006		1	21st place (2006)	TBD
Turkey	European Group J top three	31 August 2026	6th	2002	2019	1	2nd place (2010)	TBD

== Venues ==
In their official bid video, Qatar proposed four venues for the World Cup, and was ratified on 27 August 2025. According to FIBA, Qatar was selected as the host nation due to the proximity of its proposed venues; being located "in one city" and are 30 minutes apart from each other. Three of the four venues, Lusail Arena, Al Attiyah Arena and the Duhail Arena, were built for the 2015 World Men's Handball Championship. The Al Janoub Stadium, a retractable roof football stadium that hosted matches during the 2022 FIFA World Cup, as well as the 2023 AFC Asian Cup, will be temporarily converted into a basketball arena. All four venues will also host various sports during the 2030 Asian Games.

Lusail (Doha Area)	Doha	2027 FIBA Basketball World Cup is located in Qatar
Lusail Arena	Duhail Arena	2027 FIBA Basketball World Cup is located in Qatar
Capacity: 15,227	Capacity: 5,500	2027 FIBA Basketball World Cup is located in Qatar
Al Rayyan (Doha Area)	Al Wakrah	2027 FIBA Basketball World Cup is located in Qatar
Al Attiyah Arena	Al Janoub Arena	2027 FIBA Basketball World Cup is located in Qatar
Capacity: 8,600	Capacity: 8,200	2027 FIBA Basketball World Cup is located in Qatar

== Preparations ==
=== Turnover ceremony ===
At halftime of the 2023 FIBA Basketball World Cup final between Germany and Serbia at the SM Mall of Asia Arena in Pasay, Metro Manila, a turnover ceremony took place officially hand over the hosting rights of the FIBA Basketball World Cup from the Philippines, Japan, and Indonesia to Qatar. FIBA Central Board members Manuel V. Pangilinan from the Philippines and Yuko Mitsuya from Japan, and member of the Indonesian House of Representatives Budi Djiwandono passed a ball to then-FIBA President Hamane Niang, who then passed it to Qatar Basketball Federation President Mohammed Saad Al-Meghaiseeb and Marketing and Communications Director of the Qatar Olympic Committee Sheikha Asma Al Thani.

=== FIBA Basketball World Cup 2027 Board ===
The FIBA Basketball World Cup 2027 Council held its first meeting on 30 November and 1 December 2023.

== Format ==
Like in the past two editions, the tournament will be played in three phases – the group stage, the second round, and the final phase. In the group stage, the 32 qualified teams will be sorted into eight groups of four (A–H), where every team in a group will play each other once. The top two teams from each group will then advance to the second round. The bottom two teams will then play two classification games to determine the 17th to 32nd rankings. In the second round, there will be four groups (I–L) of four made up of the teams that advanced from the first round, again playing each other once. The top two teams from groups I to L will qualify for the final phase. The teams that lost in the quarterfinals will then play classification games to determine the 5th to 8th rankings.

== Sponsorship ==
FIBA Global Partners	Global Suppliers	Official Ticketing Partner
1xbet; Ganten; Intersport; Jetour; Molten Corporation; Nike, Inc.; Smart Communications; TCL Technology; Tissot; XTB S.A.; Yili Group	Junckers Flooring; Kuehne + Nagel; Schelde Sports	Ticketmaster

== See also ==
- 2026 FIBA Women's Basketball World Cup
