= United States women's national under-17 basketball team =

United States
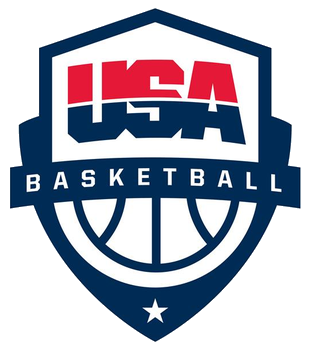
- FIBA ranking: 1st
- FIBA zone: FIBA Americas
- National federation: USA Basketball
- Coach: Steve Gomez

FIBA Under-17 Women's World Cup
- Appearances: 8
- Medals: Gold: 2010, 2012, 2014, 2018, 2022, 2024, 2026; Bronze: 2016

FIBA Under-16 Women's AmeriCup
- Appearances: 9
- Medals: Gold: 2009, 2011, 2013, 2017, 2019, 2021, 2023, 2025; Bronze: 2015
Medal record
FIBA Under-17 Women's World Cup
Gold medal – first place	2010 France
Gold medal – first place	2012 Netherlands
Gold medal – first place	2014 Czech Republic
Gold medal – first place	2018 Belarus
Gold medal – first place	2022 Hungary
Gold medal – first place	2024 Mexico
Gold medal – first place	2026 Czechia
Bronze medal – third place	2016 Spain
FIBA Under-16 Women's AmeriCup
Gold medal – first place	2009 Mexico
Gold medal – first place	2011 Mexico
Gold medal – first place	2013 Mexico
Gold medal – first place	2017 Buenos Aires
Gold medal – first place	2019 Chile
Gold medal – first place	2021 Guanajuato
Gold medal – first place	2023 Yucatán
Gold medal – first place	2025 Irapuato
Bronze medal – third place	2015 Mexico

The USA women's national under-17 basketball team is the women's basketball team, administered by USA Basketball, that represents the United States in international under-17 and under-16 (under age 17 and under age 16) women's basketball competitions, consisting mainly of the FIBA Americas Under-16 Championship for Women and FIBA Under-17 World Championship for Women. These events replaced the USA Basketball Women's Youth Development Festival.

The usual sequence is for the U16 team to play in a regional championship in one year, with the top three qualifying teams being invited to a World Championship in the following year, as the U17 team. The first FIBA Americas U16 Championship For Women was held in 2009. The qualifying teams were invited to the 2010 FIBA U17 World Championship for Women held in France. The events are on a two-year cycle, with U16 events in 2009 and 2011, and the corresponding U17 events in 2010 and 2012.

The U16 team becomes the U17 team, with largely the same players and coaches, although invitations are not automatic and changes can occur.

== Competitive record ==
=== FIBA Under-17 Women's World Cup ===
Year	Result	Position	Pld	W	L	Ref
(France) 2010	Champions	1st	8	8	0	
(Netherlands) 2012	Champions	1st	8	8	0	
(Czech Republic) 2014	Champions	1st	7	7	0	
(Spain) 2016	Third place	3rd	7	6	1	
(Belarus) 2018	Champions	1st	7	7	0	
(Hungary) 2022	Champions	1st	7	7	0	
(Mexico) 2024	Champions	1st	7	7	0	
(Czech Republic) 2026	Champions	1st	7	7	0	
Total	7 titles	8/8	58	57	1	—N/a

=== FIBA Under-16 Women's AmeriCup ===
Year	Result	Position	Pld	W	L	Ref
(Mexico) 2009	Champions	1st	5	5	0	
(Mexico) 2011	Champions	1st	5	5	0	
(Mexico) 2013	Champions	1st	5	5	0	
(Mexico) 2015	Third place	3rd	5	4	1	
(Argentina) 2017	Champions	1st	5	5	0	
(Chile) 2019	Champions	1st	6	6	0	
(Mexico) 2021	Champions	1st	6	6	0	
(Mexico) 2023	Champions	1st	6	6	0	
(Mexico) 2025	Champions	1st	6	6	0	
Total	8 titles	9/9	49	48	1	—N/a

== 2011 U16 results ==
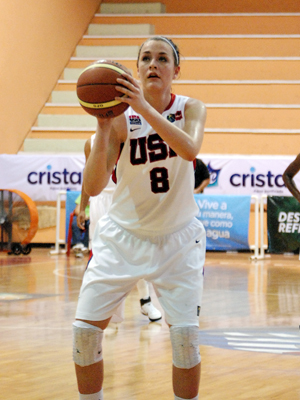
Rebecca Greenwell, hit 4-of-5 3-point fleid goal attempts in the US semi-final win over Puerto Rico

The US team opened the 2011 FIBA Americas U16 Championship in Mexico City with a game against Brazil on Monday, 13 June. Although the US team started the game with a 6–0 run, the team from Brazil responded, and held a 34–31 lead at halftime. The US team held Brazil to eight points in the third period to retake the lead. The US squad held on to win the first game with a score of 71–54. Mercedes Russell, from Springfield High School in Springfield Oregon, set US single-game records for points and rebounds, with 21 and 15 respectively.

The US team faced the team from Argentina on the following day. The score was close for the early part of the game, with both teams tied at nine points apiece, then a lead by Argentina at 14–13, and a lead by the US at 17–16. The US put on a 17–0 run in the second quarter to take a large lead, and continued on to a win with a score of 82–46. Rebecca Greenwell from Owensboro Catholic High School in Owensboro Kentucky was the leading scorer with 22 points.

The US team faced Venezuela on the following day, Wednesday. The US team opened up an early lead, and held the Venezuela team to single digit scoring for the first three periods. The US team won with a final score of 114–32. Rebecca Greenwell tied with Stephanie Mavunga from Brownsburg High School in Indianapolis Indiana for the scoring lead; each player had 18 points. The win qualified the team for the medal rounds.

After a day off, the US team faced Puerto Rico in the semifinal game. The US team jumped out to a ten-point margin in the first quarter, but a 23–0 run in the second quarter produced a commanding lead that would not be challenged. The US won, with a final score of 99–51. Rebecca Greenwell repeated as the scoring leader, with 20 points.

The gold medal game on Saturday was a rematch between the US and first round opponent Brazil. While the earlier game had been close at the half, in this game, the US outscored Brazil 19–8 in the first period, and held a 21-point lead by halftime. The US went on to win the game, the gold medal and a n invitation to the 2012 world championships with a score of 73–40. Jannah Tucker's seven steals set a US U16 single-game record, eclipsing the previous record of five steals in a game. Rebecca Greenwell shared tournament MVP honors with Izabella Frederico Sangalli of Brazil.

== 2012 U17 results ==
The 2012 U17 World Championship was held in Amsterdam 17–26 August 2012. The US squad underwent training at the Walt Disney World Resort in Orlando, Florida between 28 May and 1 June, then re-assembled at the U.S. Olympic Training Center in Colorado Springs, Colorado from the first through the eighth of August. The team then flew to Caorle, Italy for more training, including exhibition games against some of the teams. The team then traveled to Amsterdam, for the World Championships.

=== Preliminary round ===
The twelve qualifying teams are separated into two groups, with six teams in each group.

Group A

- Belgium
- Italy
- United States
- South Korea
- Canada
- Mali

Group B

- Japan
- Spain
- Australia
- Netherlands
- Brazil
- Turkey

The first five rounds are played as a round-robin, which each team playing all five of the other teams in their group. The preliminary rounds were scheduled for 17—22 August, with 20 August as an off day.

The first game for the US team was against South Korea. Although South Korea tried to utilize a full-court press, the US team was able to break the press, and scored 72 points in the first half. Rebecca Greenwell and Brianna Turner each scored 20 or more points, while Linnae Harper set a US U17 record with five steals. Mercedes Russell scored 17 points on perfect shooting from the field, hitting all eight of her field goal attempt. The US won 131–89.

The second preliminary round game was against Canada. The game was close at first, with the US team holding a six-point lead at the end of the first quarter, 18–12. In the second quarter, Diamond DeShields scored eleven of her game total 29 points to help extend the US lead. The US team held Canada to 21% shooting, and ended up with an 86–47 victory. In addition to her team high 29 points, DeShields also had five steals, tying the US U17 record set the day before.

The third game was against Italy. The US team had five scorers in double digits, lead by Rebecca Greenwell with 16 points. The US team held the Italian team to under 17% field goal shooting for the game, leading to an 83–43 victory.

The US team started slow against Belgium, holding only a four-point lead at the end of the first quarter. Although they opened up the lead to 16 points by halftime, the Belgian team cut the lead back to eight in the third period. The US team responded with an 11–4 run to extend the lead to 15, then broke open the game in the fourth quarter, and won by thirty points 80–50. Diamond DeShields had a double-double with 14 points and 11 rebounds, while Linnae Harper broke her own steals record by swiping seven in the game. The team hit 7 of 11 three-point attempts to set a record for three-point shooting.

The US team had little trouble with Mali in the final game of the preliminary round. Four bench players had more minutes than the starter with e most minutes, but the US team still managed to set a record for the largest margin of victory in U17 history, admittedly brief, as it only goes back to 2010. The final score was 98–28.

=== Quarterfinals ===
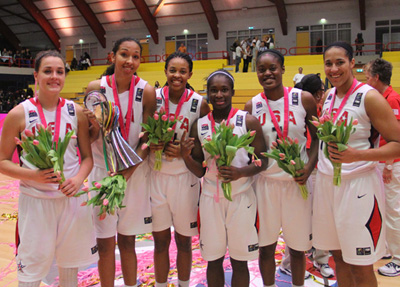
2012 USA Basketball Women's U17 World Championship Team members

The US advanced to the quarterfinals with a game against the fourth place team in Group B, Australia. The US team scored first, but Australia at on an 11–1 run to take a seven-point lead. The Australian team still lead by five at the end of the first quarter. The US team out-scored the Aussies 22–13 in the second period, but this left them with only a four-point margin at halftime. The US team extended the margin in the third quarter, and again in the fourth, ending up with a win 89–68. The US did not shoot well, hitting only a third of their shots, but blocked 16 shots, a US U17 record, and Linnae Harper broke her own steals record with eight. The win advances the US team to the semi-finals against Canada, a team they beat earlier in the preliminary rounds.

=== Semifinals ===
The semifinal game against Canada resembled the quarterfinal game in many respects. The US scored the first three points, then gave up a run to give up the lead. The US team shot poorly, again hitting a third of their shots, but garnered 23 steals, lead by Harper's seven. They forced the Canadians into 31 turnovers, and ended up with an 84–59 win, in a game in which every US player scored. The win sets up the gold medal game against Spain.

=== Final ===
The gold medal game matched up the US with Spain. The opening of the game looked headed toward a blowout. The US had a 22–8 lead at the end of the first quarter. However, the team from Spain did not quit, and out-scored the US in the second quarter. They were unable to take the lead, but cut the margin to single digits. The game continued to see-saw, with the US opening up a large lead, then Spain responding and trimming the margin to single digits. Spain was unable to close the gap, and the US ended up earning the gold medal with a 75–62 win. The MVP of the Tournament was presented to Diamond DeShields. Teammate Linnae Harper was also named to the All Tournament team.

== 2013 U16 results ==
The 2013 FIBA Americas U16 Championship was held in Cancun, Mexico. In the opening game, the US team took on Brazil. They scored the first eight points of the game, and went on to open up a commanding lead. The US won 76–20, with Asia Durr scoring 20 points. During one stretch starting at the end of the first quarter, and extending into the second, the team scored 21 consecutive points. In the second game, the US faced the team from Argentina. Asia Durr again led all scorers, with 23 points. Crystal Dangerfield scored 16 on 7 of 9 shooting. DeJanae Boykin had a double-double with 12 points and 12 rebounds. The US team had a 23-point lead at halftime, but outscored their opponents 38–6 in the third period to leave no doubt as to the outcome, winning easily, 98–28. In the last game of preliminary round play, the US faced Costa Rica. The US completely out matched their opponents, with seven players reaching double figures, led by Katie Lou Samuelson's 20 points. Costa Rica held a brief lead at 4–2, but the US team scored the next 33 points to put the game away. The final score was 106–19. The win secured the US position in the 2014 FIBA U17 World Championship, because the top four finishers in the U16 event are qualifiers.

=== Semifinals ===
The US faced the host team, Mexico in the semis. Mexico started out with an early lead, up 5–4 in the second minute, but the US team then scored the next 25 points. Three players shared top scoring honors, each with 16 points: Lauren Cox, Arike Ogunbowale and Katie Lou Samuelson. The final score was 101–29.

=== Finals ===
In the first four games, the outcome was all but decided by the end of the first quarter. In the gold medal game against Canada, the results would be very different. Canada entered the game with a 4–0 record, the same as the US team. The game started with low scoring, neither team managing to reach double digits in the quarter. At the end of the first quarter the teams were tied 9–9. The scoring picked up in the second quarter, but by both teams. The US team, after hitting only 3 of their first 16 field goal attempts, went on a 10–0 run to take an eight-point lead, but Canada did not fold, and responded to tie the game. The teams were tied at 27 points each at halftime. The teams traded baskets early in the third period, but then the US went on a 22–0 run to take a large lead. The US extended the lead until it reached 38 points in the fourth quarter. Canada outscored the US over the final minutes, but the game was out of reach, and the US went on to win the game 82–48, and the gold medal. Asia Durr was named the tournament MVP. She had set three single game records for the U16 tournament, including most points, 26, most steals, 8, and most field goal attempts 22. Teammate Katie Lou Samuelson also set a record. She hit 8 three-pointers on only eight attempts in the final game, to set a record for three-pointers made and three-point shooting percentage for a game.

== 2014 U17 results ==
The 2014 FIBA U17 World Championship For Women were held in Klatovy and Plzeň, Czech Republic. Prior to the official matches, some teams played friendlies in Nogent-sur-Seine, France.

=== Exhibitions ===
The US team took on China in a match on 20 June 2014. The game was close at the end of the first quarter, with the US holding a six-point lead, 23–17. The US extended the lead at halftime to 15 points. In the second half, the US team continued to extend the lead, and ended the game with a 40-point victory, 89–49. The five starters for the US squad all scored in double digits, led by Arike Ogunbowale with 16 points.

The US took on Canada in the second exhibition. The game began as a close match, with the US holding only a three-point lead at halftime, 33–30. In the third period, the US held Canada to nine points, and extended the lead, then stepped up defensively and offensively in the fourth period, outscoring Canada 31–6 to win the game 80–45. Joyner Holmes recorded a double-double with 14 points and 11 rebounds.

The third and final exhibition was against the host team, France. The opening period was close, with the US holding on to a slim lead, 18–15. The US outscored France in the second period by 20–8, to take a large lead at halftime. The US hit 47% of their shots in the first half while holding France to % shooting. These numbers would almost reverse in the second half, with the US shooting under 30% and France hitting 57% of their shots. The halftime lead of 15 points was cut to only two points at the beginning of the last period. France outscored the US in the final period to win the game 78–72.

=== Preliminary round ===
The US faced China in the first game of the preliminary round. The two teams had played each other in a friendly match the week before in France. The US shot poorly, hitting under 30% of their shots in the first half, but defense helped the US team hold China to four points in the opening quarter. China did better ant he second quarter, but was only able to cut the lad to seven points. The offense started working for the US in the third quarter, when the US scored 25 points, and the US went on to win 69–41. Katie Lou Samuelson, who had not played in any of the exhibition games, tied a US U17 record for three-pointers attempted, hitting four of ten attempts. Samuelson led all scorers with 22 points, while Lauren Cox led the team in rebounds with 12.

The second opening round game was against France, a team that had beaten the US a week earlier. This time the result was very different. The US scored first, never trailed, and went on to a convincing 88–40 win. The team shot better than they had the previous day, hitting 46% of their shots, and holding France to 28% shooting. The US outscored France in each quarter, but especially in the final quarter scoring 26 points and holding France to a single point. Samuelson was the leading scorer with 17 points, while Asia Durr led the team in assist with four, and scored 14 points. Sabrina Ionescu was the leading rebounder with six rebounds and led the team in steals with four.

Early in the final game of the opening round, the US scored 22 consecutive points against Mali to set the tone for the game. The US only allowed six points in the first quarter, then improved to allowing only four in the second quarter, and only gave up three in the third period. By then, the outcome was not in doubt, and the US went on to win 78–22. Joyner Holmes had a double-double with 12 points and 11 rebounds.

=== Medal rounds ===
The US faced Canada in the quarter finals. The teams were familiar with each other, as they had played in an exhibition in France a week earlier. The game started slowly, with Canada holding an early 5–3 lead, when Ogunbowale scored seven straight points as part of a 13–0 run to open up a US lead. Samuelson hit back to back three-pointers in the second quarter and the US held a comfortable 41–14 lead at the half. After a strong third quarter, the team from Canada came back and outscored the US in the final period, but by then the game was out of reach. The US won 86–45. Joyner Holmes was the leading scorer with 24 points.

In the semi-final game against Hungary, the US team gave up 26 points in the first quarter, but still managed to end the quarter with a six-point lead, largely due to six three-pointers hit by Samuelson, a US Women's U17 record. The second period was lower scoring, with the US scoring 14 to Hungary's 13. In the third and fourth periods, the US extended the lead, ending with a 91–63 win. Samuelson was the leading scorer with 25 points, but Asia Durr led the team with 24 efficiency points, with 14 scoring points, along with three steals, four rebounds and a team leading six assists. Kristine Anigwe recorded a double-double with 14 rebounds and 14 points.

In the gold medal game, both the US and Spain entered the game undefeated. The US started well, opening up an early 7–2 lead, but Spain came back strong. The lead changed hands in the first half, with the US holding on to a five-point lead at halftime. The US scored the first six points of the second half to push the lead to double digits, but Spain cut the lead back to just two points at the end of the third period. Spain hit three-pointers in the final period and took the lead; the game was tied at 71 points each late in the game. The US team outscored Spain by just 6–4 over the remaining time to win the game and the gold medal. Spain's Ángela Salvadores scored 40 points for her team and was awarded the tournament MVP honors, but it wasn't quite enough. The US's Lauren Cox scored 20 points, while the team set a US U17 record for blocked shots, with eight. The US's Joyner Holmes and Katie Lou Samuelson were named to the all-tournament team.

== 2015 U16 results ==
The 2015 FIBA Americas U16 Championship was held in Puebla, Mexico. Eight teams from North, South and Central America qualified for the event, which will crown a champion for the event, and that team will be automatically qualified for the U17 World Championship in 2017.

=== Preliminary round ===
USA team faced Argentina in their first game. The US team started out slowly, but led Argentina 17–8 by the end of the first quarter. The US team outscored Argentina in each of the four quarters, and ended up winning 80–48. Alexis Morris and Andre Espinoza-Hunter shared high scorer honors with 16 points each Valencia Myers was the leading rebounder with eight rebounds. All 12 players participated with every player earning at least 10 minutes.

In the second game, the US team faced Honduras. The team started out even slower than they did against Argentina falling behind early and ending the first quarter with a one-point deficit 13–12. They came alive in the second quarter outscoring Honduras 26–7. That opened up a largely they would never relinquish an end of the game with the win 86–41. Honesty Scott-Grayson was the leading scorer for the US, with 18 points. Desireé Caldwell recorded 10 assists, which is a US Women's U16 record.

The third game was against the host team Mexico. The host team started with a very early lead 5–2, but Alexis Morris would hit a three as the start of a 9–0 run to open up a lead for the US. Morris would go on to score 15 points in the game. US had a small lead at the end of the first quarter which they extended in the second but the third quarter with an outscore the host 32–13 put the game out of reach. Destiny Littleton was the leading scorer for the US with 17 points. Aquira DeCosta ad a double double with 10 points and 12 rebounds. The final score, in favor of the US, was 85–44, which advances the US team to the medal rounds.

=== Medal rounds ===
The US team took on Brazil in the semifinals. The US team fell behind early and was as many as 22 point behind. They worked even the score and got to within six points in the fourth. But could not close the gap and lost 73–63. By virtue of the top four finish in the event the team automatically qualifies for the 2016 FIBA U17 World Championship.

The bronze medal game was a rematch between the US and Mexico a team the US had beaten earlier. This time would be no different although the margin of victory was larger. The US team jumped to a 22–6 lead in the first quarter and outscored the opponents and each quarter including a 10–0 fourth-quarter. The final score was 81–24 in favor of the US team.

== 2016 U17 results ==
The 2015 FIBA U17 World Championship was held in Zaragoza, Spain from June 22 to July 2, 2016. Sixteen countries, including the US competed.

=== Preliminary rounds ===
The US defeated South Korea 104–45 in their first game, setting several records, including team records for rebounds with 85 free throws aid with 31 and free throws attempted with 43. Aquira DeCosta set an individual record with 17 rebounds. The second game was against the Czech Republic. Although the US team led by as much as 15 points, the Czech team cut the margin to three points with just under seven minutes left in the game. The US team went on to win 72–63. In the game against Italy, the Italian team lead for more than half the game, but the US team put together a 12–0 run late in the game to take the lead in hang on for the win 59–55. In the final preliminary round game the US beat Brazil 79 – 62. Christyn Williams scored 19 points, including hitting all seven of her feet throw attempts to tie a record for free-throw percentage.

=== Quarterfinals ===
The US took on France in the quarterfinals. The US had a three-point lead with just over six minutes left in the game but the defense held France scoreless for the final six minutes; the US finished with a 56–45 win.

=== Semi-finals ===
Both Australia and US were undefeated going into their semi final match. The Australian team took an early lead and never gave up the lead. The US attempted several comebacks but were never able to overtake the Aussies. The final score in favor of Australia was 73–60.

=== Bronze medal game ===
The US faced China and the bronze medal game. Although the US had a double-digit lead at halftime they only led by two points with just over five minutes left. The US extended the lead to eight points and held China scoreless for 3 1/2 minutes to end up with a 65–50 win and the bronze medal.

== Coaches and results ==
Head coaches, assistant coaches and managers for the U16 and U17 teams, through 2016.

First	Last	Team	Position	Coached at	Year	W–L	Results
Barbara	Nelson	U16	Head coach	Wingate University (NC)	2009	5–0	Gold
Mike	Armstrong	U16	Assistant coach	Perry Meridian H.S. (IN)	2009	5–0	Gold
Doreena	Bingham	U16	Assistant coach	Team Alaska AAU	2009	5–0	Gold
Barbara	Nelson	U17	Head coach	Wingate University (NC)	2010	8–0	Gold
Mike	Armstrong	U17	Assistant coach	Perry Meridian H.S. (IN)	2010	8–0	Gold
Doreena	Bingham	U17	Assistant coach	Team Alaska AAU	2010	8–0	Gold
Jill	Rankin Schneider	U16	Head coach	Monterey H.S. Texas	2011	5–0	Gold
Gail	Hook	U16	Assistant coach	Monterey H.S. Colo	2011	5–0	Gold
Letitia	Hughley	U16	Assistant coach	Flint Northern Academy and Mott CC, MI.	2011	5–0	Gold
Betsy	Nadler	U16	Trainer	The Green Hill School, Texas	2011	5–0	Gold
Jill	Rankin Schneider	U17	Head coach	Monterey H.S., Texas	2012	5–0	Gold
Gail	Hook,	U17	Assistant coach	Monarch H.S., Colo.	2012	5–0	Gold
Letitia	Hughley,	U17	Assistant coach	Mott Community College,	2012	5–0	Gold
Jeff	Kawaguchi,	U17	Trainer	Eastern Washington University	2012	5–0	Gold
Sue	Phillips	U16	Head coach	Archbishop Mitty High School	2013	5–0	Gold
Mary Coyle	Klinger	U16	Assistant coach	Rutgers Preparatory School, N.J.	2013	5–0	Gold
Brian	Robinson	U16	Assistant coach	Bishop McGuinness H.S.	2013	5–0	Gold
Sue	Phillips	U17	Head coach	Archbishop Mitty High School	2014	7–0	Gold
Mary Coyle	Klinger	U17	Assistant coach	Rutgers Preparatory School, N.J.	2014	7–0	Gold
Brian	Robinson	U17	Assistant coach	Bishop McGuinness H.S.	2014	7–0	Gold
Dori	Oldaker	U16	Head coach	Mt. Lebanon H.S. (Pa.)	2015	4–1	Bronze
Dianne	Lewis	U16	Assistant coach	Thomas Edison H.S. (Va.)	2015	4–1	Bronze
Samantha	Quigley	U16	Assistant coach	University of St. Francis (NAIA, Ill.)	2015	4–1	Bronze
Geoffrey	Doner	U16	Physician		2015	4–1	Bronze
Angie	Lawrence	U16	Trainer	University of Central Florida	2015	4–1	Bronze
Dori	Oldaker	U17	Head coach	Mt. Lebanon H.S. (Pa.)	2016	6–1	Bronze
Dianne	Lewis	U17	Assistant Coach	Thomas Edison H.S. (Va.)	2016	6–1	Bronze
Samantha	Quigley	U17	Assistant Coach	University of St. Francis (NAIA, Ill.)	2016	6–1	Bronze
Carla	Berube	U16	Head Coach	Tufts University	2017	5–0	Gold
Steve	Gomez	U16	Assistant Coach	Lubbock Christian University	2017	5–0	Gold
Vanessa	Nygaard	U16	Assistant Coach	Windward School (C.A.)	2017	5–0	Gold
Carla	Berube	U17	Head Coach	Tufts University	2018	7–0	Gold
Steve	Gomez	U17	Assistant Coach	Lubbock Christian University	2018	7–0	Gold
Vanessa	Nygaard	U17	Assistant Coach	Windward School (C.A.)	2018	7–0	Gold
Mark	Campbell	U16	Head Coach	Union University	2019	6–0	Gold
Kelly	Carruthers	U16	Assistant Coach	James Bowie H.S., Texas	2019	6–0	Gold
Ruth	Sinn	U16	Assistant Coach	University of St. Thomas	2019	6–0	Gold
Sue	Phillips	U16	Head Coach	Archbishop Mitty H.S.	2021	6–0	Gold
Tom	McConnell	U16	Assistant Coach	Indiana University Pennsylvania	2021	6–0	Gold
Sophia	Witherspoon	U16	Assistant Coach	Fort Pierce Central H.S.	2021	6–0	Gold
Sue	Phillips	U17	Head Coach	Archbishop Mitty H.S.	2022	7–0	Gold
Tom	McConnell	U17	Assistant Coach	Indiana University Pennsylvania	2022	7–0	Gold
Brittany	Johnson	U17	Assistant Coach	Evanston Township H.S.	2022	7–0	Gold
Dan	Rolfes	U16	Head Coach	Incarnate Word Academy	2023	6–0	Gold
Bobbi	Morgan	U16	Assistant Coach	Ursinus College	2023	6–0	Gold
Trenia	Tillis-Hoard	U16	Assistant Coach	Tyler Junior College	2023	6–0	Gold
Meg	Barber	U17	Head Coach	New York University	2024	7–0	Gold
Bobbi	Morgan	U17	Assistant Coach	Ursinus College	2024	7–0	Gold
Trenia	Tillis-Hoard	U17	Assistant Coach	Tyler Junior College	2024	7–0	Gold

== Players ==
Players participating on U16 and U17 teams, 2009 through 2025.

First	Last	Team	Year	High School Played at
Jordan	Adams	U16	2009	Mater Dei (CA)
Cierra	Burdick	U16	2009	Butler (NC)
Bashaara	Graves	U16	2009	Clarksville (TN)
Justine	Hartman	U16	2009	Brea Olinda
Betnijah	Laney	U16	2009	Smyrna (DE)
Ariel	Massengale	U16	2009	Bolingbrook
Kaleena	Mosqueda-Lewis	U16	2009	Mater Dei (CA)
Alexia	Standish	U16	2009	Colleyville Heritage
Breanna	Stewart	U16	2009	Cicero-North Syracuse
Kiah	Stokes	U16	2009	Linn Mar
Alexyz	Vaioletama	U16	2009	Mater Dei (CA)
Elizabeth	Williams	U16	2009	Princess Anne
Jordan	Adams	U17	2010	Mater Dei (CA)
Cierra	Burdick	U17	2010	Butler (NC)
Bashaara	Graves	U17	2010	Clarksville (TN)
Betnijah	Laney	U17	2010	Smyrna (DE)
Jewell	Loyd	U17	2010	Niles West
Ariel	Massengale	U17	2010	Bolingbrook
Kaleena	Mosqueda-Lewis	U17	2010	Mater Dei (CA)
Bria	Smith	U17	2010	Christ the King Regional
Imani	Stafford	U17	2010	Windward School
Breanna	Stewart	U17	2010	Cicero-North Syracuse
Morgan	Tuck	U17	2010	Bolingbrook
Elizabeth	Williams	U17	2010	Princess Anne
Recee'	Caldwell	U16	2011	Lady Bird Johnson
Jordin	Canada	U16	2011	Windward School
Kaela	Davis	U16	2011	Buford (GA)
Rebecca	Greenwell	U16	2011	Owensboro Catholic
Linnae	Harper	U16	2011	Whitney M. Young Magnet
Stephanie	Mavunga	U16	2011	Brownsburg
Erica	McCall	U16	2011	Ridgeview (Bakersfield, CA)
Taya	Reimer	U16	2011	Hamilton Southeastern
Mercedes	Russell	U16	2011	Springfield (OR)
Jannah	Tucker	U16	2011	New Town (MD)
Sydney	Umeri	U16	2011	The Lovett School Acworth, GA
Jatarie	White	U16	2011	Providence Day School
Lindsay	Allen	U17	2012	St. John's College
Oderah	Chidom	U17	2012	Bishop O'Dowd
Kaela	Davis	U17	2012	Buford (GA)
Diamond	DeShields	U17	2012	Norcross
Rebecca	Greenwell	U17	2012	Owensboro Catholic
Linnae	Harper	U17	2012	Whitney M. Young Magnet
Kai	James	U17	2012	William T. Dwyer
Erica	McCall	U17	2012	Ridgeview (Bakersfield, CA)
Taya	Reimer	U17	2012	Hamilton Southeastern
Mercedes	Russell	U17	2012	Springfield (OR)
Brianna	Turner	U17	2012	Manvel
Jessica	Washington	U17	2012	Jenks
DeJanae	Boykin	U16	2013	Charles H. Flowers
Kalani	Brown	U16	2013	Salmen
Chassity	Carter	U16	2013	Dickson County
Lauren	Cox	U16	2013	Flower Mound
Crystal	Dangerfield	U16	2013	Blackman
Chelsea	Dungee	U16	2013	Preston Public School
Asia	Durr	U16	2013	St. Pius X Catholic (GA)
Sabrina	Ionescu	U16	2013	Miramonte
Nancy	Mulkey	U16	2013	Cypress Woods
Taylor	Murray	U16	2013	Annapolis Area Christian School
Arike	Ogunbowale	U16	2013	Divine Savior Holy Angels
Katie Lou	Samuelson	U16	2013	Mater Dei (CA)
Kristine	Anigwe	U17	2014	Desert Vista
DeJanae	Boykin	U17	2014	Charles H. Flowers
Kennedy	Burke	U17	2014	Sierra Canyon School
Natalie	Chou	U17	2014	Plano West Senior
Lauren	Cox	U17	2014	Flower Mound
Asia	Durr	U17	2014	St. Pius X Catholic (GA)
Joyner	Holmes	U17	2014	Cedar Hill
Sabrina	Ionescu	U17	2014	Miramonte
Nancy	Mulkey	U17	2014	Cypress Woods
Arike	Ogunbowale	U17	2014	Divine Savior Holy Angels
Katie Lou	Samuelson	U17	2014	Mater Dei (CA)
Anna	Wilson	U17	2014	Collegiate School (VA)
Jayda	Adams	U16	2015	Mater Dei (CA)
Desireé	Caldwell	U16	2015	Lady Bird Johnson
Aquira	DeCosta	U16	2015	St. Mary's (Stockton, CA)
Andra	Espinoza-Hunter	U16	2015	Blair Academy
Destiny	Littleton	U16	2015	The Bishop's School
Lauryn	Miller	U16	2015	Kirkwood H.S.
Alexis	Morris	U16	2015	Legacy Christian Academy (Beaumont, Texas)
Valencia	Myers	U16	2015	Solon
Sedona	Prince	U16	2015	Faith Academy
Honesty	Scott-Grayson	U16	2015	Blair Academy
Bexley	Wallace	U16	2015	Pickerington Central
Jade	Williams	U16	2015	Prestonwood Christian Academy
Janelle	Bailey	U17	2016	Providence Day School
Jenna	Brown	U17	2016	The Lovett School, Marietta, GA
Samantha	Brunelle	U17	2016	William Monroe
Charli	Collier	U17	2016	Barbers Hill
Aquira	DeCosta	U17	2016	St. Mary's (Stockton, CA)
Maya	Dodson	U17	2016	St. Francis Schools
Destanni	Henderson	U17	2016	Fort Myers Senior
Taylor	Mikesell	U17	2016	Jackson (OH)
Olivia	Nelson-Ododa	U17	2016	Winder-Barrow
Sedona	Prince	U17	2016	Liberty Hill
Abby	Prohaska	U17	2016	Lakota West
Christyn	Williams	U17	2016	Central Arkansas Christian School
Fran	Belibi	U16	2017	Regit Jesuit
Aliyah	Boston	U16	2017	Worcester Academy
Samantha	Brunelle	U16	2017	William Monroe
Paige	Bueckers	U16	2017	Hopkins
Caitlin	Clark	U16	2017	Dowling Catholic
Zia	Cooke	U16	2017	Rogers (Toledo, OH)
Azzi	Fudd	U16	2017	Potomac School
Jordan	Horston	U16	2017	Columbus Africentric Early College
Diamond	Miller	U16	2017	Franklin (NJ)
Jordyn	Oliver	U16	2017	Prosper
Celeste	Taylor	U16	2017	Long Island Lutheran
Kylee	Watson	U16	2017	Mainland Regional (NJ)
Fran	Belibi	U17	2018	Regit Jesuit
Aliyah	Boston	U17	2018	Worcester Academy
Cameron	Brink	U17	2018	Southridge (Beaverton, Oregon)
Samantha	Brunelle	U17	2018	William Monroe
Paige	Bueckers	U17	2018	Hopkins
Zia	Cooke	U17	2018	Rogers (Toledo, OH)
Azzi	Fudd	U17	2018	St. John's College
Jordan	Horston	U17	2018	Columbus Africentric Early College
Haley	Jones	U17	2018	Archbishop Mitty
Charisma	Osborne	U17	2018	Windward School
Celeste	Taylor	U17	2018	Long Island Lutheran
Hailey	Van Lith	U17	2018	Cashmere (WA)
Janiah	Barker	U16	2019	Tampa Bay Tech
Lauren	Betts	U16	2019	Grandview (CO)
KK	Bransford	U16	2019	Mount Notre Dame
Sonia	Citron	U16	2019	The Ursuline School
Amari	DeBerry	U16	2019	Williamsville South
Timea	Gardiner	U16	2019	Fremont (Utah)
Londynn	Jones	U16	2019	Santiago (Corona, CA)
Olivia	Miles	U16	2019	Blair Academy
Aaliyah	Moore	U16	2019	Moore (OK)
Saylor	Poffenbarger	U16	2019	Middletown (MD)
Kiki	Rice	U16	2019	Sidwell Friends School
Payton	Verhulst	U16	2019	Bishop Miege
KK	Arnold	U16	2021	Germantown (WI)
Madison	Booker	U16	2021	Germantown (MS)
Jaloni	Cambridge	U16	2021	The Ensworth School
Breya	Cunningham	U16	2021	La Jolla Country Day School
Jadyn	Donovan	U16	2021	Sidwell Friends School
Kendall	Dudley	U16	2021	Sidwell Friends School
Margaret	Mendelson	U16	2021	Fremont (Utah)
Olivia	Olson	U16	2021	Benilde-St. Margaret's
Grace	Slaughter	U16	2021	Grain Valley
Delaney	Thomas	U16	2021	St. John's College
JuJu	Watkins	U16	2021	Sierra Canyon School
Jada	Williams	U16	2021	La Jolla Country Day School
Sunaja	Agara	U17	2022	Hopkins
Madison	Booker	U17	2022	Germantown (MS)
Jaloni	Cambridge	U17	2022	The Ensworth School
Morgan	Cheli	U17	2022	Archbishop Mitty
Breya	Cunningham	U17	2022	La Jolla Country Day School
Jadyn	Donovan	U17	2022	Sidwell Friends School
Hannah	Hidalgo	U17	2022	Paul VI
Mackenly	Randolph	U17	2022	Sierra Canyon School
Kennedy	Umeh	U17	2022	McDonogh School
JuJu	Watkins	U17	2022	Sierra Canyon School
Jada	Williams	U17	2022	La Jolla Country Day School
Mikaylah	Williams	U17	2022	Parkway (LA)
Jacy	Abii	U16	2023	Liberty (Frisco, TX)
Darriana	Alexander	U16	2023	Purcell Marian
Kelsi	Andrews	U16	2023	Hazel Green
Addison	Bjorn	U16	2023	Park Hill South
Aaliyah	Crump	U16	2023	Minnetonka
Lanie	Grant	U16	2023	James River (Chesterfield County, VA)
Jayla	Jackson	U16	2023	Sidwell Friends School
Trinity	Jones	U16	2023	Naperville Central
Lola	Lampley	U16	2023	Lawrence Central
Jerzy	Robinson	U16	2023	Desert Vista
Hailee	Swain	U16	2023	Holy Innocents Episcopal School
McKenna	Woliczko	U16	2023	Archbishop Mitty
Jacy	Abii	U17	2024	Liberty
Kelsi	Andrews	U17	2024	Hazel Green
Addison	Bjorn	U17	2024	Park Hill South
Alex	Eschmeyer	U17	2024	Peak to Peak Charter School
Lanie	Grant	U17	2024	James River (Chesterfield County, VA)
Lola	Lampley	U17	2024	Lawrence Central H.S.
Jordyn	Palmer	U17	2024	Westtown School
Jerzy	Robinson	U17	2024	Sierra Canyon School
Emilee	Skinner	U17	2024	Ridgeline (UT)
Hailee	Swain	U17	2024	Holy Innocents Episcopal School
Ivanna	Wilson-Manyacka	U17	2024	Bullis School
McKenna	Woliczko	U17	2024	Archbishop Mitty
Jazman	Bailey	U16	2025	Mansfield Lakeridge
Caroline	Bradley	U16	2025	Oak Grove (LA)
Reece	Gilpatrick	U16	2025	Broomfield
Tatianna	Griffin	U16	2025	Ontario Christian School
Jordyn	Haywood	U16	2025	Mary Institute and St. Louis Country Day School
Olivia	Jones	U16	2025	Long Island Lutheran
Eve	Long	U16	2025	Olathe South
Micah	Ojo	U16	2025	Princess Anne
Morghan	Reckley	U16	2025	Sandy Creek
Arianna	Robinson	U16	2025	Plano East
Nation	Williams	U16	2025	Centennial (NV)
Ivanna	Wilson-Manyacka	U16	2025	Bullis School

== See also ==
- USA Basketball
- United States women's national basketball team
- United States women's national under-19 basketball team
- USA Women's Pan American Team
- USA Women's World University Games Team
- United States women's national 3x3 team
- FIBA Under-19 World Championship for Women
- FIBA Americas Under-18 Championship for Women
- United States men's national basketball team
- United States men's national under-19 basketball team
- United States men's national under-17 basketball team
