= Preston School District =

Preston School District refers to:

- Preston Joint School District 201 (Idaho)
- Preston Community School District (Iowa)
- Preston Public School (Oklahoma)
