= Cassandre Prosper =

Canadian basketball player (born 2005)

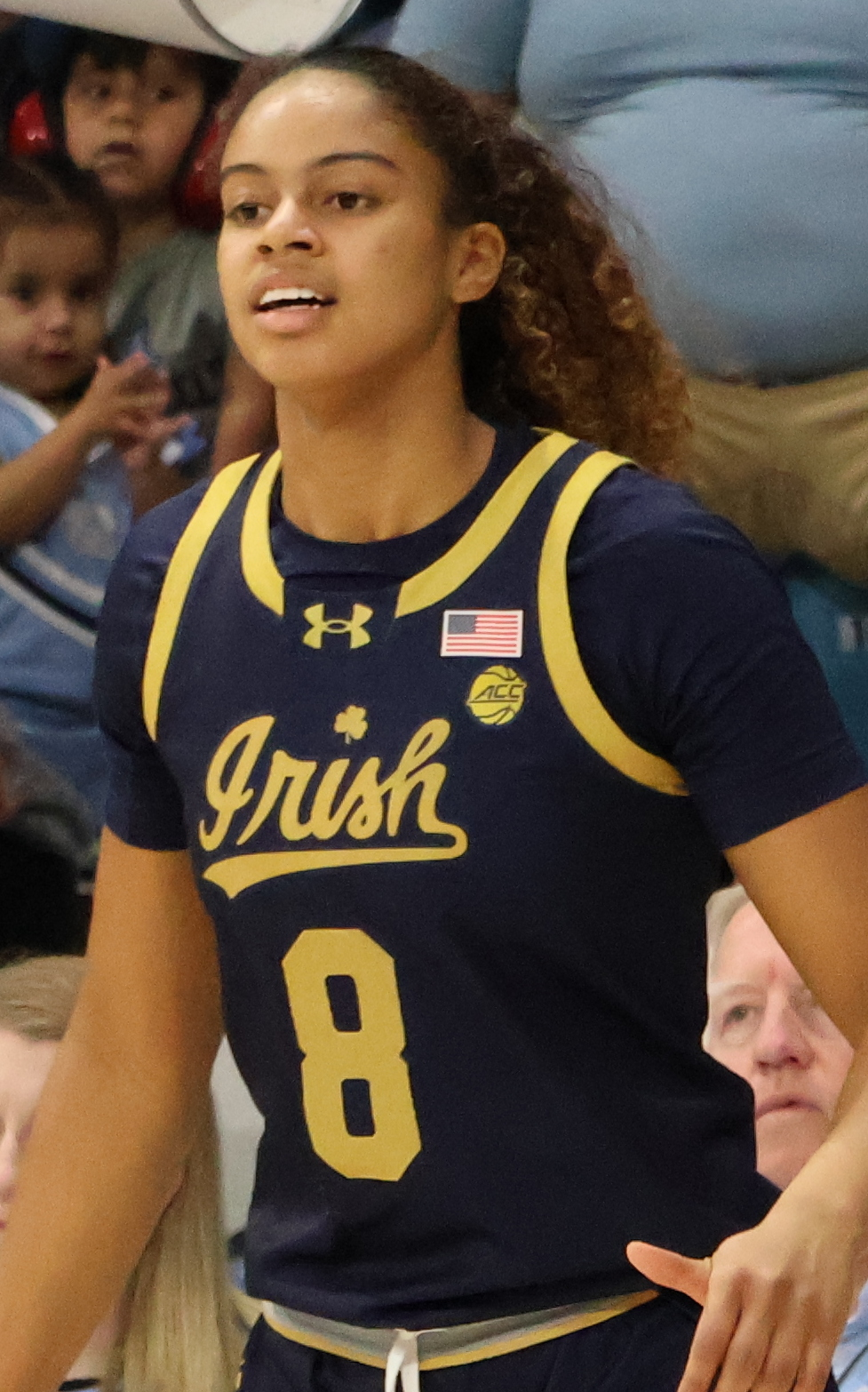
- Prosper with Notre Dame in 2025

No. 18 – Washington Mystics
- Position: Shooting guard / small forward
- League: WNBA

Personal information
- Born: June 25, 2005 (age 21) Montreal, Quebec, Canada
- Listed height: 6 ft 3 in (1.91 m)
- Listed weight: 182 lb (83 kg)

Career information
- High school: Cairine Wilson Secondary School (Ottawa, Ontario)
- College: Notre Dame (2022–2026)
- WNBA draft: 2026: 2nd round, 19th overall pick
- Drafted by: Washington Mystics
- Playing career: 2026–present

Career history
- 2026–present: Washington Mystics
- Stats at Basketball Reference
Medals
Women's basketball
Representing Canada
FIBA Women's AmeriCup
Bronze medal – third place	2023 León	Team
FIBA Under-19 World Cup
Bronze medal – third place	2023 Spain	Team
FIBA Under-16 Americas Championship
Silver medal – second place	2021 Mexico	Team

Cassandre Prosper (born June 25, 2005) is a Canadian professional basketball player for the Washington Mystics of the Women's National Basketball Association (WNBA). She played college basketball for the Notre Dame Fighting Irish. Internationally, she represents the Canada national team.

== High school career ==
Prosper attended Cairine Wilson Secondary School in Ottawa, Ontario and Capital Courts Academy. During the 2022 season she averaged 25.1 points to lead the league in scoring while also recording 13.7 rebounds, 2.9 assists, 3.1 steals and 2.6 blocks and led the team to its first ever OSBA championship. At the 2022 Ontario Scholastic Basketball Association Final 8 championships she was named finals MVP after scoring 33 points, 15 rebounds and two assists. Following the season she was named the 2022 Ontario Scholastic Basketball Association season MVP and First-Team All-Star. She was also named the 2022 Biosteel Player of the Year.

During the 2023 season she averaged 23.2 points, 13.2 rebounds and 2.6 assists per game over 10 games. She was a five-star recruit and ranked as the No. 16 overall recruit per the ESPN HoopGurlz recruiting rankings.

== College career ==
On November 14, 2022, Prosper committed to play college basketball at Notre Dame. On December 12, 2022, she announced she would enroll early at Notre Dame. She joined the team after Christmas and made her collegiate debut on December 29, 2022, in a game against Miami. During the 2022–23 season, in her freshman year, she played in 22 games and averaged 22 minutes, 5.2 points, 3.9 rebounds, 0.7 assists, 0.9 blocks and 0.8 steals per game.

During the 2023–24 season, in her sophomore year, she appeared in five games, with three starts, before missing the remainder of the season with a lower leg injury on November 29, 2023. On November 21, 2023, she scored a career-high 19 points in a game against Chicago State. Prior to her injury she averaged 8.2 points and 4.6 rebounds per game with nine steals and three blocks.

During the 2025–26 season, in her senior year, she started all 36 games and averaged 13.6 points, 6.5 rebounds and 1.6 steals in 33.2 minutes per game on 49.2% shooting from the field. She scored in double figures in 27 games, 20 or more points six times, and recorded six double-doubles. She helped the Irish reach their first Elite Eight since 2019. During her collegiate career she appeared in 97 games, with 43 starts, and averaged 8.7 points and 4.8 rebounds per game, finishing her Irish career with 842 points and 465 rebounds.

== Professional career ==
On April 13, 2026, Prosper was drafted in the second round, 19th overall, by the Washington Mystics in the 2026 WNBA draft. Her brother, Olivier-Maxence Prosper, was drafted 24th overall by the Sacramento Kings in the 2023 NBA draft. The Prosper siblings became the first Canadian-born brother-sister duo to be drafted into the NBA and WNBA.

== National team career ==
Prosper represented Canada at the 2021 FIBA Under-16 Women's Americas Championship where she averaged 18.6 points, 10.6 rebounds, 3.0 assists, 3.2 steals and 1.2 blocks and won a silver medal. During the gold medal game against the United States she scored 13 points and five rebounds. She led team Canada in scoring, and ranked second in the tournament behind JuJu Watkins, and was subsequently named to the 2021 FIBA Americas Cup All-Star Five team.

She represented Canada at the 2022 FIBA Under-17 Women's Basketball World Cup where she started in all seven games, and averaged 14.0 points, 9.6 rebounds, 2.4 assists, 4.6 steals and 3.0 blocks. During the bronze medal game she recorded 18 points, five rebounds and five assists. She stole the ball and scored on a layup with eight seconds remaining in the game to bring Canada within two points, however, they ran out of time, and lost to France 82–84. Following the tournament she was named to the all-tournament team.

She made her senior national team debut for Canada at the 2023 FIBA Women's AmeriCup where she averaged seven points, 2.9 rebounds and 1.6 steals in 19.8 minutes per game and won a bronze medal.

She represented Canada at the 2023 FIBA Under-19 Women's Basketball World Cup where she averaged 16.2 points, 5.8 rebounds, 2.3 assists, 1.8 steals and 1.8 blocks per game and won a bronze medal. She led the team in scoring and steals and ranked second in assists and blocks, and ranked fourth among all players in the World Cup in blocks. She missed the bronze medal game due to an undisclosed reason.

She represented Canada at the 2024 FIBA Women's Americas Pre-Qualifying Olympic Qualifying Tournament, where she averaged eight points, 3.7 rebounds and 1.3 assists per game in three games. After going undefeated during the tournament, Canada qualified for the 2024 FIBA Women's Olympic Qualifying Tournaments. On July 2, 2024, she was named to team Canada's roster for the 2024 Summer Olympics.

== Personal life ==
Prosper is the daughter of Gaetan and Guylaine Prosper. She is of Haitian descent. Her parents both played college basketball at Concordia University and were both multiple-time RSEQ All-Stars. Her mother also competed for Canada women's national basketball team. Her brother, Olivier-Maxence Prosper, played college basketball at Marquette and is a professional basketball player for the Memphis Grizzlies.

== Career statistics ==
Legend
GP	Games played	GS	Games started	MPG	Minutes per game	RPG	Rebounds per game
APG	Assists per game	SPG	Steals per game	BPG	Blocks per game	PPG	Points per game
TO	Turnovers per game	FG%	Field-goal percentage	3P%	3-point field-goal percentage	FT%	Free-throw percentage
**Bold**	Career best	°	League leader

=== College ===
Year	Team	GP	GS	MPG	FG%	3P%	FT%	RPG	APG	SPG	BPG	TO	PPG
2022-23	Notre Dame	22	0	21.9	32.1	21.7	63.6	3.9	0.7	0.8	0.9	1.6	5.2
2023-24	Notre Dame	5	3	22.8	34.9	20.0	**81.8**	4.2	1.4	**1.8**	0.6	**1.2**	8.2
2024-25	Notre Dame	34	4	22.4	45.7	**32.6**	65.4	3.7	0.9	0.9	0.7	1.7	5.8
2025-26	Notre Dame	**36**	**36**	**33.2**	**49.2**	30.5	73.8	**6.5**	**1.6**	1.6	**1.1**	2.1	**13.6**
**Career**		97	43	26.3	44.5	27.8	70.6	4.8	1.2	1.2	0.9	1.8	8.7
Statistics retrieved from Sports-Reference.
