= Delaney Gibb =

Canadian basketball player (born 2005)

No. 11 – BYU Cougars
- Position: Guard
- League: Big 12 Conference

Personal information
- Born: August 27, 2005 (age 21) Raymond, Alberta, Canada
- Listed height: 5 ft 10 in (1.78 m)

Career information
- High school: Timpview (Provo, Utah); Raymond (Raymond, Alberta)
- College: BYU (2024–present)

Career highlights
- Big 12 Freshman of the Year (2025); First-team All-Big 12 (2026); Second-team All-Big 12 (2025); Big 12 All-Freshman Team (2025); 2x Nike Hoop Summit (2023, 2024)
Medals
Women's basketball
Representing Canada
FIBA Women's AmeriCup
Bronze medal – third place	2025 Chile
FIBA Under-19 World Cup
Bronze medal – third place	2023 Spain	Team
FIBA Under-16 Americas Championship
Silver medal – second place	2021 Mexico	Team

Delaney Gibb (born August 27, 2005) is a Canadian college basketball player for BYU.

== Early life and High school career ==
Gibb was born to Alan and Tonya Gibb. Her sister, Saige, is a basketball player for Utah Valley. She attended Timpview High School in Provo, Utah her freshman year before transferring to Raymond High School. She led Raymond to three consecutive 4A Provincial Championships in 2022, 2023, and 2024, and was named Alberta's Miss Basketball in 2022, 2023, and 2024, becoming the first three-time winner in history.

On June 20, 2023, she committed to play college basketball at BYU. She was named to the World Team for the inaugural women's Nike Hoop Summit in 2023. She was again named to the World Team in 2024.

== College career ==
During the 2024–25 season, in her freshman year, she started all 30 games, and led her team in scoring (17.4), rebounds (5.3), and assists (4.1) per game. She set several BYU freshman records, ranking first in points per game (17.4), second in points (522), field goal attempts (402), three-point field goals per game (2.57), assists (124), and assists per game (4.1), and third in field goals (182), three-point field goals (77), free throws (81) and minutes per game (33:47). On March 1, 2025, in a game against Utah, she scored a career-high 36 points, and ten rebounds, for her second career double-double. She was subsequently named the Big 12 Freshman of the Week for the tenth time. She became the second player in Big 12 Conference history to be receive the award at least ten times, following Ayoka Lee in 2020. Following an outstanding season she was named Big 12 Freshman of the Year. She was also named to the Big 12 All-Freshman Team and Second Team All-Big 12.

== National team career ==
Gibb made her national team debut for Canada at the 2021 FIBA Under-16 Women's Americas Championship. During the tournament she averaged 13.7 points, 7.5 rebounds and 3.3 assists per game and won a silver medal. She ranked second on the team in scoring, behind teammate Cassandre Prosper. In August 2022, she represented Team Alberta at the 2022 Canada Summer Games where she served as flag bearer and won a gold medal.

She represented Canada at the 2022 FIBA Under-17 Women's Basketball World Cup, where she averaged 9.6 points, 3 rebounds, and 3.3 assists per game, as Canada lost to France 82–84 in the bronze medal game. She then competed at the 2023 FIBA Under-19 Women's Basketball World Cup, where she averaged 10.3 points, 4.6 rebounds, and 1.6 assists per game and won a bronze medal.

On June 25, 2025, she was named to team Canada's roster for the 2025 FIBA Women's AmeriCup. During the tournament she averaged 9.1 points, 2.9 rebounds and 1.3 assists per game and won a bronze medal.

== Career statistics ==
=== College ===
Year	Team	GP	GS	MPG	FG%	3P%	FT%	RPG	APG	SPG	BPG	TO	PPG
2024–25	BYU	30	30	33.8	45.3	39.5	77.1	5.3	4.1	1.6	0.5	4.5	17.4
Career		30	30	33.8	45.3	39.5	77.1	5.3	4.1	1.6	0.5	4.5	17.4
Statistics retrieved from Sports-Reference.
