= 2021 FIBA Under-16 Women's Americas Championship =

7th FIBA Under-16 Women's Americas Basketball Championship

Tournament details
- Host country: Mexico
- City: León
- Dates: 23–29 August
- Teams: 8 (from 1 confederation)
- Venue: 1 (in 1 host city)

Final positions
- Champions: United States (6th title)
- Runners-up: Canada
- Third place: Mexico

Tournament statistics
- MVP: (United States) JuJu Watkins
- Top scorer: (United States) JuJu Watkins: 20.0
- Top rebounds: (Brazil) Taissa Queiroz: 14.0
- Top assists: (United States) Jada Williams: 7.5
- PPG (Team): (United States) USA: 120.0
- RPG (Team): Brazil: 69.3
- APG (Team): (United States) USA: 26.2

Official website
- Official website

The 2021 FIBA Under-16 Women's Americas Championship was an international basketball competition held in León, Guanajuato, Mexico, from 23 to 29 August 2021. It was the seventh edition of the FIBA Under-16 Women's Americas Championship. The top four teams qualified for the 2022 FIBA Under-17 Women's Basketball World Cup in Hungary.

== Qualification ==
Eight teams from three sub zones were qualified through the Nike Youth Ranking for each sub-zone.

Sub-zone	Vacancies	Qualified
North area	2	Canada; United States
Central America and the Caribbean area (CONCENCABA)	3	Puerto Rico; Costa Rica; Mexico
South American (CONSUBASQUET)	3	Argentina; Brazil; Chile

== Draw ==
The draw ceremony for the competition took place on 10 August at the FIBA Regional Office, in the city of Miami, Florida.

Group A	Group B
Puerto Rico; Canada; Brazil; Costa Rica	Argentina; United States; Chile; Mexico

== Group phase ==
All times are local (UTC−5).

=== Group A ===
Pos	Team	Pld	W	L	PF	PA	PD	Pts	Qualification
1	Canada	3	3	0	296	131	+165	6	Quarterfinals
2	Puerto Rico	3	2	1	184	214	−30	5	Quarterfinals
3	Brazil	3	1	2	196	187	+9	4	Quarterfinals
4	Costa Rica	3	0	3	101	245	−144	3	Quarterfinals

Source: FIBA

23 August 2021
11:30

Boxscore

Puerto Rico	60–45	Costa Rica
Scoring by quarter: 18-14, 16-7, 21–13, 5-11
Pts: García 13; Rebs: Rivera 8 Asts: Torres 4		Pts: James 11; Rebs: Montero 7 Asts: 0

Fair Dome, León, Guanajuato
Referees: Claudio Andrés Osorio Vargas (CHI), Carla Cristel Peña Moreta (DOM), Alejandra Godoy Montero (URU)

23 August 2021
14:30

Boxscore

Canada	82–56	Brazil
Scoring by quarter: 33-13, 16-14, 18-18, 15-11
Pts: Prosper 24; Rebs: Prosper 9 Asts: Prosper 4		Pts: Nascimento Queiroz 16; Rebs: Nascimento Queiroz 9 Asts: Prande Freitas 5

Fair Dome, León, Guanajuato
Referees: Leydys Castellon Baro (CUB), Romina Belén Morales Ibrra (ARG), Daniel Ronald Jimenez Choque (BOL)

24 August 2021
11:30

Boxscore

Costa Rica	25–112	Canada
Scoring by quarter: 8-24, 7-25, 2-37, 8-26
Pts: McGuinness 5 Rebs: Montero 6 Asts: James 2		Pts: Prosper 24; Rebs: Prosper 9 Asts: Sta. Maria 3

Fair Dome, León, Guanajuato
Referees: Claudio Andrés Osorio Vargas (CHI), JIMENEZ CHOQUE, Daniel Ronald Jimenez Choque (BOL), Nancy Yunuhen Romo Salinas (MEX)

24 August 2021
14:30

Boxscore

Brazil	67–74	Puerto Rico
Scoring by quarter: 33-13, 16-14, 18-18, 15-11
Pts: Passos Alves Da Silva 23; Rebs: Passos Alves Da Silva 22; Asts: Nascimento Queiroz 4		Pts: Torres 17; Rebs: Muñoz 7 Asts: Torres 5

Fair Dome, León, Guanajuato
Referees: Leydys Castellon Baro (CUB), Romina Belén Morales Ibarra (ARG), Carla Cristel Peña Moreta (DOM)

25 August 2021
11:30

Boxscore

Puerto Rico	50–102	Canada
Scoring by quarter: 18-29, 7-27, 17-28, 8-18
Pts: De Pool 13; Rebs: Muñoz 8 Asts: García 5		Pts: Gibb 23; Rebs: Gibb 11; Asts: Sta. Maria 6

Fair Dome, León, Guanajuato
Referees: José Antonio De María Gómez (PAN), Romina Belén Morales Ibarra (ARG), Alejandra Godoy Montero (URU)

25 August 2021
14:30

Boxscore

Brazil	73–31	Costa Rica
Scoring by quarter: 10-12, 30-5, 17-11, 16-3
Pts: Guyton 18; Rebs: Passos Alves Da Silva 16; Asts: Guyton 4		Pts: James 7 Rebs: James 8 Asts: Cordero 2

Fair Dome, León, Guanajuato
Referees: Claudio Andrés Osorio Vargas (CHI), Daniel Ronald Jimenez Choque (BOL), Samanta Fiallos Peralvo (ECU)

=== Group B ===
Pos	Team	Pld	W	L	PF	PA	PD	Pts	Qualification
1	United States	3	3	0	358	102	+256	6	Quarterfinals
2	Argentina	3	1	2	163	234	−71	4	Quarterfinals
3	Mexico	3	1	2	169	246	−77	4	Quarterfinals
4	Chile	3	1	2	138	246	−108	4	Quarterfinals

Source: FIBA

23 August 2021
17:30

Boxscore

United States	117–23	Chile
Scoring by quarter: 37-6, 22-4, 33-9, 25-4
Pts: Watkins 21; Rebs: Watkins 7 Asts: Williams 3		Pts: Vega 8 Rebs: Poblete 4 Asts: Pizarro 2

Fair Dome, León, Guanajuato
Referees: José Antonio De María Gómez (PAN), Samanta Fiallos Peralvo (ECU), Mónica Mongelos (PAR)

23 August 2021
20:30

Boxscore

Mexico	66–58	Argentina
Scoring by quarter: 37-6, 22-4, 33-9, 25-4
Pts: Flores 20; Rebs: Guajardo 10; Asts: Navarro 5		Pts: Giacone 12; Rebs: Cergneux 15; Asts: Espedale 4

Fair Dome, León, Guanajuato
Referees: Maria Claudia Comodaro Morales (BRA), Mauricio Chinchilla Picado (CRC), Rebeca Xiomaira Davila Aquino (PUR)

24 August 2021
17:30

Boxscore

Chile	53–69	Argentina
Scoring by quarter: 12-13, 12-22, 16-13, 13-21
Pts: Pizarro 15; Rebs: Poblete 11; Asts: Pizarro 4		Pts: Espedale 12; Rebs: Giacone 9 Asts: Guglielmi 3

Fair Dome, León, Guanajuato
Referees: María Claudia Comodaro Morales (BRA), José Antonio De María Gómez (PAN), Mónica Mongelos (PAR)

24 August 2021
20:30

Boxscore

Mexico	43–126	United States
Scoring by quarter: 37-6, 22-4, 33-9, 25-4
Pts: Maciel 12; Rebs: Guajardo 4 Asts: Navarro 2		Pts: Watkins 21; Rebs: Thomas 8 Asts: Cambridge 4

Fair Dome, León, Guanajuato
Referees: Christine Vuong (CAN), Rebeca Xiomaira Davila Aquino (PUR), Alejandra Godoy Montero (URU)

25 August 2021
17:30

Boxscore

Argentina	36–115	United States
Scoring by quarter: 4-32, 13-30, 5-26, 14-27
Pts: Maggi 6 Rebs: Lagowski 6 Asts: Amaya 2		Pts: Watkins 17; Rebs: Thomas 10; Asts: Williams 9

Fair Dome, León, Guanajuato
Referees: Leydys Castellon Baro (CUB), Christine Vuong (CAN), Carla Cristel Peña Moreta (DOM)

25 August 2021
20:30

Boxscore

Chile	62–60	Mexico
Scoring by quarter: 37-6, 22-4, 33-9, 25-4
Pts: Vega 17; Rebs: Paredes 8 Asts: Pizarro 7		Pts: Maciel 15; Rebs: Mendoza 9 Asts: Mendoza 3

Fair Dome, León, Guanajuato
Referees: María Claudia Comodaro Morales (BRA), Mauricio Chinchilla Picado (CRC), Rebeca Xiomaira Davila Aquino (PUR)

== Knockout stage ==
=== Bracket ===
Fifth place
Brazil	49
Puerto Rico	68
Seventh place
Chile	59
Costa Rica	58

5–8th place semifinals
Chile	44
Brazil	75
Puerto Rico	81
Costa Rica	48

Quarterfinals
1A	Canada	76
4B	Chile	25
2B	Argentina	56
3A	Brazil	54
2A	Puerto Rico	66
3B	Mexico	67
1B	United States	121
4A	Costa Rica	12

Semifinals
Canada	74
Argentina	47
Mexico	30
United States	121

Final
Canada	45
United States	118
Third place
Argentina	67
Mexico	72

=== Quarterfinals ===
27 August 2021
11:30

Boxscore

United States	121–12	Costa Rica
Scoring by quarter: 36-7, 30-1, 28-0, 27-4
Pts: Mendelson 18; Rebs: Donovan 10; Asts: Watkins 7		Pts: Cordero 5 Rebs: Murillo 5 Asts: McGuinness 1

Fair Dome, León, Guanajuato
Referees: Claudio Andrés Osorio Vargas (CHI), Christine Vuong (CAN), Samanta Fiallos Peralvo (ECU)

27 August 2021
14:30

Boxscore

Canada	76–25	Chile
Scoring by quarter: 19-13, 17-8, 28-4, 12-0
Pts: Prosper 21; Rebs: Prosper 16; Asts: Sta. Maria 5		Pts: Vega 8 Rebs: Rojas 6 Asts: Vega 3

Fair Dome, León, Guanajuato
Referees: Leydys Castellon Baro (CUB), Mauricio Chinchilla Picado (CRC), Alejandra Godoy Montero (URU)

27 August 2021
17:30

Boxscore

Argentina	56–54	Brazil
Scoring by quarter: 6-15, 22-7, 13-19, 15-13
Pts: Espedale 14; Rebs: Cergneux 9 Asts: Barrionuevo 3		Pts: Nascimento Queiroz 19; Rebs: Nascimento Queiroz 20; Asts: Nascimento Queiroz 4

Fair Dome, León, Guanajuato
Referees: José Antonio De María Gómez (PAN), Rebeca Xiomaira Davila Aquino (PUR), Daniel Ronald Jimenez Choque (BOL)

27 August 2021
20:30

Boxscore

Puerto Rico	66–67	Mexico
Scoring by quarter: 12-17, 15-16, 20-19, 19-15
Pts: Crespo 18; Rebs: García 9 Asts: De Pool 3		Pts: Mendoza 13; Rebs: Mora 10; Asts: Maciel 5

Fair Dome, León, Guanajuato
Referees: María Claudia Comodaro Morales (BRA), Romina Belén Morales Ibarra (ARG), Mónica Mongelos (PAR)

=== 5-8th place seminfinals ===
28 August 2021
11:30

Boxscore

Chile	44–75	Brazil
Scoring by quarter: 12-17, 9-19, 12-20, 11-19
Pts: Vega 13; Rebs: Paredes 5 Asts: Pizarro 3		Pts: Nascimento Queiroz 22; Rebs: Nascimento Queiroz 21; Asts: Prande Freitas 4

Fair Dome, León, Guanajuato
Referees: Leydys Castellon Baro (CUB), Christine Vuong (CAN), Romina Belén Morales Ibarra (ARG)

28 August 2021
14:30

Boxscore

Puerto Rico	81–48	Costa Rica
Scoring by quarter: 22-15, '17-9, 25-15, 17-9
Pts: Carreno 18; Rebs: Torres 9 Asts: Martínez 4		Pts: McGuinness 14; Rebs: Montero 10; Asts: Pérez 3

Fair Dome, León, Guanajuato
Referees: José Antonio De María Gómez (PAN), Daniel Ronald Jimenez Choque (BOL), Carla Cristel Peña Moreta (DOM)

=== Seminfinals ===
28 August 2021
17:30

Boxscore

Canada	74–47	Argentina
Scoring by quarter: 25-10, 11-6, 18-15, 20-16
Pts: Bediako 14; Rebs: Prosper 13; Asts: Sta. Maria 3		Pts: Espedale 11; Rebs: Lagowski 6 Asts: Bourgarel 2

Fair Dome, León, Guanajuato
Referees: Claudio Andrés Osorio Vargas (CHI), Maria Claudia Comodaro Morales (BRA), Samanta Fiallos Peralvo (ECU)

28 August 2021
20:30

Boxscore

Mexico	30–121	United States
Scoring by quarter: 14-40, 2-34, 9-22, 5-25
Pts: Navarro 9 Rebs: Mendoza 4 Asts: Mendoza 2		Pts: Cunningham 18; Rebs: Watkins 7 Asts: Donovan 7

Fair Dome, León, Guanajuato
Referees: Mauricio Chinchilla Picado (CRC), Alejandra Godoy Montero (URU), Rebeca Xiomaira Davila Aquino (PUR)

=== Seventh place game ===
29 August 2021
11:30

Boxscore

Chile	59–58	Costa Rica
Scoring by quarter: 9-13, 11-20, 11-11, 28-14
Pts: Vega 19; Rebs: Paredes 9 Asts: Pizarro 5		Pts: Montero 22; Rebs: Montero 13; Asts: Cordero 4

Fair Dome, León, Guanajuato
Referees: José Antonio De María Gómez (PAN), Rebeca Xiomaira Davila Aquino (PUR), Mónica Mongelos (PAR)

=== Fifth place game ===
29 August 2021
17:30

Boxscore

Brazil	49–68	Puerto Rico
Scoring by quarter: 12-17, 11-24, 11-14, 15-13
Pts: Francisco De Oliveira 10; Rebs: Nascimento Queiroz 12; Asts: Nascimento Queiroz 3		Pts: Muñoz 30; Rebs: Crespo 9 Asts: García 9

Fair Dome, León, Guanajuato
Referees: Mauricio Chinchilla Picado (CRC), Samanta Fiallos Peralvo (ECU), Alejandra Godoy Montero (URU)

=== Third place game ===
29 August 2021
20:30

Boxscore

Argentina	67–72	Mexico
Scoring by quarter: 16-9, 14-22, 16-23, 21-18
Pts: Cergneux 17; Rebs: Giacone 7 Asts: Barrionuevo 4		Pts: Maciel 23; Rebs: Rubio 7 Asts: Mendoza 4

Fair Dome, León, Guanajuato
Referees: María Claudia Comodaro Morales (BRA), Christine Vuong (CAN), Daniel Ronald Jimenez Choque (BOL)

=== Final ===
29 August 2021
20:30

Boxscore (FIBA),
Boxscore (USAB)

Canada	45–118	United States
Scoring by quarter: 13-25, 11-31, 10-31, 10-31
Pts: Prosper 13; Rebs: Gibb 8 Asts: Gibb 6		Pts: Watkins 28; Rebs: Donovan 9 Asts: Williams 8

Fair Dome, León, Guanajuato
Referees: Claudio Andrés Osorio Vargas (CHI), Leydys Castellon Baro (CUB), Romina Belén Morales Ibarra (ARG)

== Final ranking ==
Qualified for the 2022 FIBA Under-17 Women's Basketball World Cup.

Rank	Team	Record
1st place, gold medalist(s)	United States	6–0
2nd place, silver medalist(s)	Canada	5–1
3rd place, bronze medalist(s)	Mexico	3–3
4	Argentina	2–4
5	Puerto Rico	4–2
6	Brazil	2–4
7	Chile	2–4
8	Costa Rica	0–6

== Statistical leaders ==
=== Players ===
Points

Pos.	Name	PPG
1	(United States) JuJu Watkins	20.0
2	(Canada) Cassandre Prosper	17.7
3	(Canada) Delaney Gibb	13.7
4	(Chile) Vania Marileo	13.3
5	(Mexico) Loriette Maciel	12.5
5	(Puerto Rico) Sofía Acevedo	12.5

Rebounds

Pos.	Name	RPG
1	(Brazil) Taissa Queiroz	14.0
2	(Brazil) Ana Alves Da Silva	12.3
3	(Canada) Cassandre Prosper	9.7
4	(Brazil) Giovanna Da Silva	9.2
5	(Costa Rica) María Camareno	7.7

Assists

Pos.	Name	APG
1	(United States) Jada Williams	5.2
2	(Chile) Betsa Nahuelhuaique	3.7
2	(United States) JuJu Watkins	3.7
4	(Puerto Rico) Paloma García	3.5
4	(Canada) Taija Sta. Maria	3.5

Steals

Pos.	Name	SPG
1	(United States) JuJu Watkins	5.2
2	(Puerto Rico) Paloma García	3.0
3	(Dominican Republic) Danny Carbuccia	2.8
4	(Canada) Cassandre Prosper	2.7
4	(United States) Jadyn Donovan	2.7
4	(Mexico) Loriette Maciel	2.7

Blocks

Pos.	Name	BPG
1	(Mexico) Valeria Mora	2.2
2	(United States) Breya Cunningham	2.0
3	(Costa Rica) María Camareno	1.8
4	(Canada) Delaney Gibb	1.5
4	(Chile) Vania Marileo	1.5

Other statistical leaders

Stat	Name	Avg.
Field goal percentage	(United States) Breya Cunningham	62.3%
3-point FG percentage	(United States) Jada Williams	52.4%
Free throw percentage	(United States) JuJu Watkins	91.7%
Turnovers	(Costa Rica) Shaima James	5.7
Fouls	(Mexico) Valeria Mora	4.0

== Awards ==
2021 Americas Under-16 champions

United States
Sixth title

- Most Valuable Player:
  - (United States) JuJu Watkins
- All-Star Five:
  - (United States) JuJu Watkins
  - (United States) Jada Williams
  - (Canada) Cassandre Prosper
  - (Mexico) Loriette Maciel
  - (Brazil) Taissa Nascimento Queiroz

== See also ==
- 2021 FIBA Under-16 Americas Championship
- 2022 FIBA Under-17 Women's Basketball World Cup
