= Morgan Cheli =

American basketball player (born 2005)

No. 23 – UConn Huskies
- Position: Point guard / shooting guard
- League: Big East Conference

Personal information
- Born: September 18, 2005 (age 21) Los Altos, California, U. S.
- Listed height: 6 ft 2 in (1.88 m)

Career information
- High school: Archbishop Mitty (San Jose, California)
- College: UConn (2024–present)

Career highlights
- NCAA champion (2025); McDonald's All-American Game (2024); Nike Hoop Summit (2024); Jordan Brand Classic (2024)
Medals
Women's basketball
Representing the United States
FIBA Under-17 World Cup
Gold medal – first place	2022 Hungary	Team

Morgan Cheli (born September 18, 2005) is an American college basketball player for the UConn Huskies of the Big East Conference.

== High school career ==
Cheli attended Archbishop Mitty High School in San Jose, California. She averaged 15 points, 7.3 assists, 5.3 rebounds and 3.1 steals per game as a senior, where she was named a McDonald’s All-American in 2024. Cheli also played for the Cal Stars, an Amateur Athletic Union team. As the nation's No. 11 recruit in the class of 2024, she committed to play college basketball at UConn.

== College career ==
During the 2024–25 season, her freshman year, Cheli appeared in 24 games, and averaged 2.5 points, 2.4 rebounds and 1.3 assists per game. On February 21, 2025, it was announced that she underwent successful surgery on her ankle and would miss the remainder of the season as UConn won the National Championship win against South Carolina.

== National team career ==
On June 7, 2022, Cheli was named to the United States under-17 national team for the 2022 FIBA Under-17 Women's Basketball World Cup. During the tournament, she averaged 6.1 points, 3.6 rebounds, 2.3 assists and a team-leading 3.0 steals, en-route to a gold medal.

== Career statistics ==
Legend
GP	Games played	GS	Games started	MPG	Minutes per game	RPG	Rebounds per game
APG	Assists per game	SPG	Steals per game	BPG	Blocks per game	PPG	Points per game
TO	Turnovers per game	FG%	Field-goal percentage	3P%	3-point field-goal percentage	FT%	Free-throw percentage
**Bold**	Career best	°	League leader

*	Denotes seasons in which Cheli won an NCAA Championship

=== College ===
Year	Team	GP	GS	MPG	FG%	3P%	FT%	RPG	APG	SPG	BPG	TO	PPG
2024–25*	UConn	24	0	13.3	39.1	37.0	—	2.4	1.3	0.4	0.0	0.6	2.5
Career		24	0	13.3	39.1	37.0	—	2.4	1.3	0.4	0.0	0.6	2.5
