= Preston, Oklahoma =

- Unincorporated community
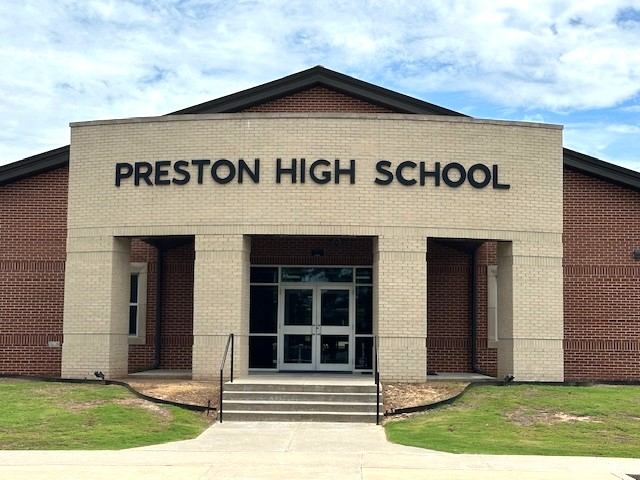
- Preston High School (2025)

- Location within Oklahoma Preston, Oklahoma (the United States)
- Coordinates: 35°42′41″N 95°59′20″W
- Country: United States
- State: Oklahoma
- County: Okmulgee

Area
  - Total: 0.46 sq mi (1.18 km^{2})
  - Land: 0.46 sq mi (1.18 km^{2})
  - Water: 0 sq mi (0.00 km^{2})
- Elevation: 791 ft (241 m)

Population (2020)
  - Total: 169
  - Density: 371/sq mi (143/km^{2})
- Time zone: UTC−6 (CST)
  - Summer (DST): UTC−5 (CDT)
- ZIP Code: 74456
- FIPS code: 40-60650
- GNIS ID: 2805349

Preston is an unincorporated community located in Okmulgee County, Oklahoma, United States. The population was 169 at the 2020 census.

== History ==
First known as Hamilton Switch, and now unrecognizable from the past, Preston was once a highly prosperous community, thriving mainly from the oil boom, as did many of the surrounding communities. Later on, as the oil industry quieted in Preston, it served as a station for restocking trains and running cattle trails, loading water from Frisco Lake.

The post office was established December 13, 1909. It was named for an Okmulgee oilman, Harry Preston.

It currently has two schools, three churches, a feed store, a heating and air company, and a hair salon, as well as a fire protection business and the offices of Oklahoma Rural Water District No. 2.

== Demographics ==
Historical population
| Census | Pop. | Note | %± |
|---|---|---|---|
| 2020 | 169 | | — |
U.S. Decennial Census

=== 2020 census ===
As of the 2020 census, Preston had a population of 169. The median age was 45.7 years. 21.9% of residents were under the age of 18 and 14.8% of residents were 65 years of age or older. For every 100 females there were 108.6 males, and for every 100 females age 18 and over there were 109.5 males age 18 and over.

0.0% of residents lived in urban areas, while 100.0% lived in rural areas.

There were 82 households in Preston, of which 36.6% had children under the age of 18 living in them. Of all households, 53.7% were married-couple households, 12.2% were households with a male householder and no spouse or partner present, and 24.4% were households with a female householder and no spouse or partner present. About 20.8% of all households were made up of individuals and 12.2% had someone living alone who was 65 years of age or older.

There were 94 housing units, of which 12.8% were vacant. The homeowner vacancy rate was 0.0% and the rental vacancy rate was 0.0%.

Racial composition as of the 2020 census
| Race | Number | Percent |
|---|---|---|
| White | 93 | 55.0% |
| Black or African American | 20 | 11.8% |
| American Indian and Alaska Native | 36 | 21.3% |
| Asian | 0 | 0.0% |
| Native Hawaiian and Other Pacific Islander | 0 | 0.0% |
| Some other race | 0 | 0.0% |
| Two or more races | 20 | 11.8% |
| Hispanic or Latino (of any race) | 5 | 3.0% |

== Education ==
Preston Public School is the school district serving the community.

== Transportation ==
Preston is served by U.S. Route 75, a major national north/south artery for much of its length, currently running from the Canada–US border at Noyes, Minnesota to Dallas.

Preston is also on Old Highway 75, being the previous two-lane alignment of US-75 running north to Beggs and south to Okmulgee.
