= Jadyn Donovan =

American basketball player

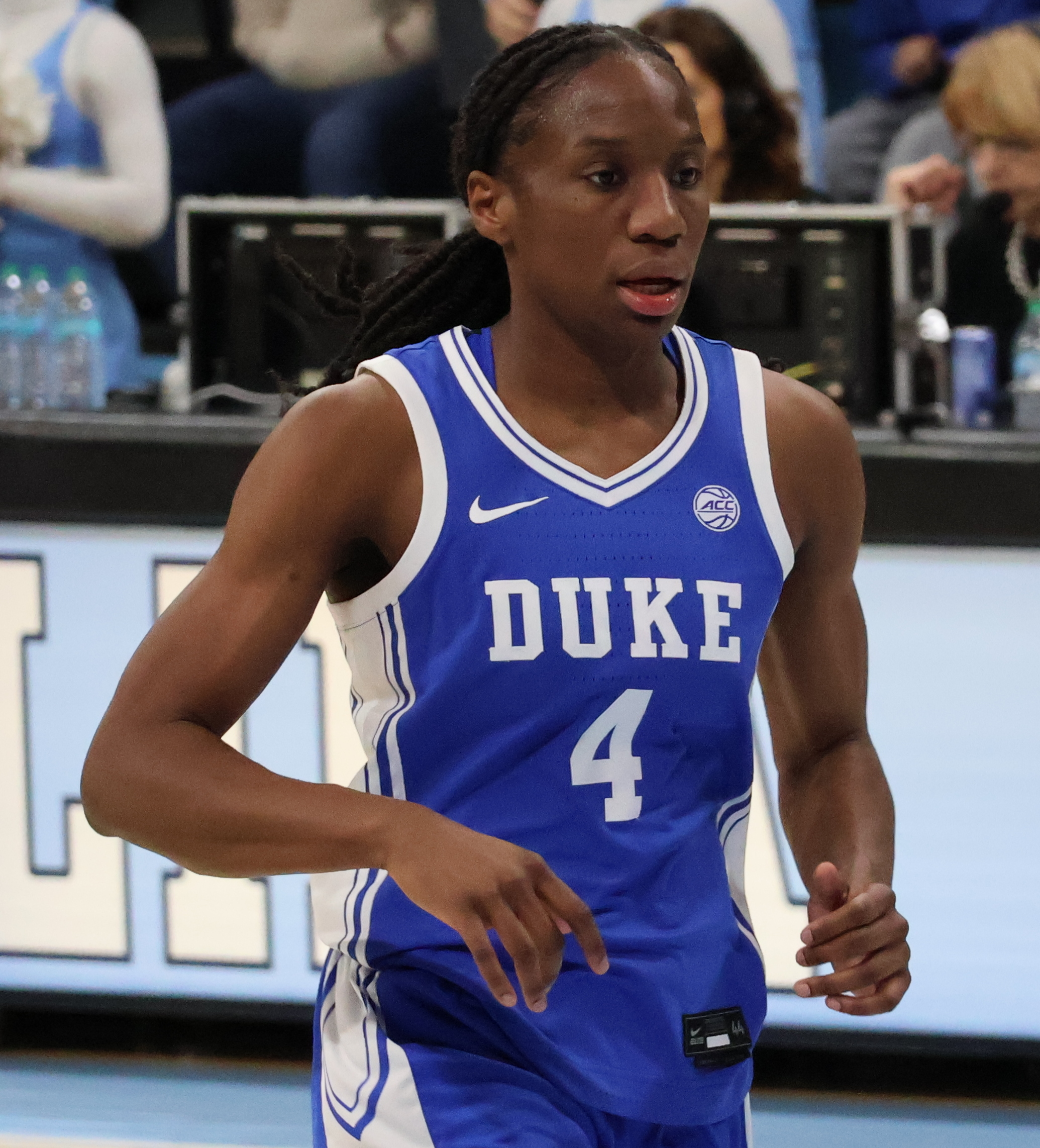
- Donovan in 2025

No. 2 – Duke Blue Devils
- Position: Shooting guard / small forward
- League: Atlantic Coast Conference

Personal information
- Born: August 31, 2005 (age 20)
- Listed height: 6 ft 0 in (1.83 m)

Career information
- High school: Sidwell Friends School (Washington D.C.)
- College: Duke (2023–present)

Career highlights
- ACC All-Defensive Team (2025); McDonald's All-American (2023); Nike Hoop Summit (2023)
Medals
Women's basketball
Representing the United States
FIBA Under-19 World Cup
Gold medal – first place	2023 Spain	Team
FIBA Under-17 World Cup
Gold medal – first place	2022 Hungary	Team
FIBA Under-16 Americas Championship
Gold medal – first place	2021 Mexico	Team

Jadyn Donovan (born August 31, 2005) is an American college basketball player for the Duke Blue Devils of the Atlantic Coast Conference (ACC).

== High school career ==
Donovan played for Sidwell Friends School in Washington D.C. As a junior, she averaged 15.2 points, 8.4 rebounds, and 3.3 steals. Alongside Kiki Rice, she helped lead the team to an undefeated season and Independent School League (ISL) and District of Columbia State Athletic Association (DCSAA) titles.

In her senior year, Sidwell Friends won a second DCSAA title. Donovan was DCSAA Player of the Year, D.C's Gatorade Player of the Year, named a McDonald's All-American, and a Naismith first-team All-American. She was also selected for the Jordan Brand Classic and the Nike Hoop Summit.

Donovan was the number 3 recruit in the Class of 2023 by ESPN. In August 2022, she committed to Duke, the highest-ranked recruit under Kara Lawson.

== College career ==
In her freshman year, Donovan averaged 6.3 points, 5.7 rebounds, and 1.4 steals. On February 22, she had a career-high 15 rebounds against Syracuse. She had a career-high four blocks against South Carolina on December 3, and Toledo on December 20.

As a sophomore, Donovan started 37 games, with an average of 5.1 points, 6.4 rebounds, and 1.3 steals. She led the team in rebounds and blocks. On November 17, she scored a career-high 23 points with 15 rebounds in a win against South Dakota State. In the postseason, she was named to the ACC All-Defensive Team.

== National team career ==
Donovan won gold with the United States in international competition three times, including the 2021 FIBA Under-16 Women's Americas Championship, the 2022 FIBA Under-17 Women's Basketball World Cup, and the 2023 FIBA Under-19 Women's Basketball World Cup.

== Career statistics ==
Legend
GP	Games played	GS	Games started	MPG	Minutes per game	RPG	Rebounds per game
APG	Assists per game	SPG	Steals per game	BPG	Blocks per game	PPG	Points per game
TO	Turnovers per game	FG%	Field-goal percentage	3P%	3-point field-goal percentage	FT%	Free-throw percentage
**Bold**	Career best	°	League leader

=== College ===
Year	Team	GP	GS	MPG	FG%	3P%	FT%	RPG	APG	SPG	BPG	TO	PPG
2023–24	Duke	34	32	22.1	**54.9**	0.0	39.4	5.7	1.7	**1.4**	1.2	2.5	**6.3**
2024–25	Duke	**37**	**37**	**24.8**	45.0	0.0	**43.5**	**6.4**	**2.1**	1.3	**1.3**	**1.8**	5.1
**Career**		76	3	18.7	43.1	30.3	77.8	2.9	2.0	1.6	0.8	1.8	11.8
Statistics retrieved from Sports-Reference.
