= Marine Dursus =

French basketball player (born 2005)

No. 5 – UConn Huskies
- Position: Point guard / shooting guard
- League: Big East Conference

Personal information
- Born: August 26, 2005 (age 21)
- Listed height: 5 ft 10 in (1.78 m)

Career information
- High school: Collège Hector Berlioz
- College: UConn (2026–present)
- Playing career: 2022–present

Career history
- 2022–2026: Union Féminine Angers Basket 49

Career highlights
- Nike Hoop Summit (2023)
Medals
Women's basketball
Representing France
FIBA Under-17 World Cup
Bronze medal – third place	2022 Hungary	Team

Marine Dursus (born August 26, 2005) is a French college basketball player for the UConn Huskies of the Big East Conference. She previously played for Union Féminine Angers Basket 49 of the La Boulangère Wonderligue.

== Playing career ==
Dursus began her career for Union Féminine Angers Basket 49 of the La Boulangère Wonderligue. In the 2025–26 season, she averaged 9.9 points, 2.1 rebounds and 1.4 assists per game.

On May 22, 2026, Dursus signed a National Letter of Intent to play college basketball at the University of Connecticut. She did not play in any preseason exhibition games due to a foot injury.

== National team career ==
Dursus made her national team debut for the French under-16 national team at the 2021 FIBA U16 Women's European Challengers. In 2022, she competed in the FIBA U17 World Cup, where she averaged 14.7 points, 3.1 rebounds and 2 assists per game, earning a bronze medal. In that same year, Dursus played in the FIBA U18 Women's European Championship, where she finished with 6.3 points per game. She won silver at the 2023 FIBA U18 Women's European Championship, averaging 13 points, 2.4 rebounds and three assists.

In FIBA U20 Women's EuroBasket competition, Dursus won a gold medal in the 2024 event, where she averaged 12.1 points, 3.7 rebounds and 1.4 assists per game. Then she averaged 13.8 points and 4.2 rebounds during the 2025 FIBA U20 Women's EuroBasket tournament.
