= Jada Williams =

American basketball player

No. 8 – LSU Tigers
- Position: Guard
- League: Southeastern Conference

Personal information
- Born: February 6, 2005 (age 21)
- Listed height: 5 ft 6 in (1.68 m)

Career information
- High school: Blue Springs (Blue Springs, Missouri); LJCDS (San Diego, California)
- College: Arizona (2023–2025); Iowa State (2025–2026); LSU (2026–present)

Career highlights
- First-team All-Big 12 (2026); Pac-12 All-Freshman Team (2024); McDonald's All-American (2023); Nike Hoop Summit (2023)

Jada Williams (born February 6, 2005) is an American college basketball player for the LSU Tigers of the Southeastern Conference. She previously played for the Arizona Wildcats and for the Iowa State Cyclones.

== High school career ==
Williams played at Blue Springs High School in Blue Springs, Missouri, in her freshman year. She transferred to La Jolla Country Day School in La Jolla, California, and was the first high school female athlete to sign an NIL deal in 2021. Williams was named to the Nike Hoop Summit and the McDonald's All-American Game. Williams was a five-star recruit and the number 21 recruit in the class of 2023. She initially committed to UCLA in March 2021, but flipped to Arizona in August 2022.

== College career ==
Williams started in 28 games and averaged 9.5 points per game in her freshman year. On February 23 2024, she scored a career-high 23 points to upset No. 3 Stanford, scoring 14 points in the fourth quarter, later winning Pac-12 Freshman of the Week. Williams was named to the Pac-12 All-Freshman team in 2024. In the postseason, Arizona would lose in the second round of the 2024 NCAA Tournament.

As a sophomore, Williams led the team in scoring and assists with 12.7 points per game and 2.9 assists per game. On November 26 2024, she had a career-high six steals in a 71–60 loss against Vanderbilt in the Acrisure Thanksgiving Tournament. She had a career-high of 25 points and seven rebounds in a loss against Utah on January 31 2025.

Williams announced that she would be transferring on March 31 2025, becoming one of five members of the team to leave. She committed to Iowa State.

After one season at Iowa State, Williams announced she would transfer to play for the LSU Tigers in the Southeastern Conference.

== National team career ==
Williams helped the United States win a gold medal at the 2021 FIBA Under-16 Women's Americas Championship in Mexico. She averaged 11.7 points, 4.0 rebounds, and 5.2 assists, and was named to the All-Star Five. At the 2022 FIBA Under-17 Women's World Cup in Hungary, she won her second gold medal, averaging 4.4 points and 2.1 assists.

== Career statistics ==
Legend
GP	Games played	GS	Games started	MPG	Minutes per game	RPG	Rebounds per game
APG	Assists per game	SPG	Steals per game	BPG	Blocks per game	PPG	Points per game
TO	Turnovers per game	FG%	Field-goal percentage	3P%	3-point field-goal percentage	FT%	Free-throw percentage
**Bold**	Career best	°	League leader

Year	Team	GP	GS	MPG	FG%	3P%	FT%	RPG	APG	SPG	BPG	TO	PPG
2023–24	Arizona	**34**	28	29.8	35.2	26.3	84.5	1.7	2.4	1.1	0.0	**2.2**	9.5
2024–25	Arizona	30	30	**30.5**	37.1	29.2	**86.2**	**3.5**	2.9	**1.6**	**0.1**	2.6	12.7
2025–26	Iowa State	32	**32**	29.8	**41.7**	**30.3**	80.5	**3.5**	**7.7**	1.0	0.0	3.5	**15.3**
**Career**		96	90	30.0	38.4	28.8	83.5	2.8	4.3	1.2	0.1	2.8	12.4
Statistics retrieved from Sports-Reference.
