= 2022 FIBA Under-17 Women's Basketball World Cup =

2022 edition of the FIBA Under-17 Women's Basketball World Cup

Tournament details
- Host country: Hungary
- Dates: 9–17 July
- Teams: 16 (from 5 confederations)
- Venues: 2 (in 1 host city)

Final positions
- Champions: United States (5th title)
- Runners-up: Spain
- Third place: France
- Fourth place: Canada

Tournament statistics
- Games played: 56
- Attendance: 4,853 (87 per game)
- MVP: (United States) JuJu Watkins
- Top scorer: (Germany) Annika Soltau (20.3 points per game)

Official website
- www.fiba.basketball

The 2022 FIBA Under-17 Women's Basketball World Cup (Hungarian: 2022-es FIBA U17-es női kosárlabda-világbajnokság) was an international basketball competition held in Debrecen, Hungary from 9 to 17 July 2022. It is the seventh edition of the FIBA Under-17 Women's Basketball World Cup. Sixteen national teams competed in the tournament.

The United States captured their fifth title after a finals win over Spain, while France defeated Canada to grab the bronze medal.

To be eligible for this competition, players must be born on or after 1 January 2005.

== Qualified teams ==
Means of qualification	Date(s)	Venue(s)	Berth(s)	Qualifiers
Host nation	31 January 2020	(Switzerland) Mies	1	Hungary
2021 FIBA U16 Women's European Challengers	9–16 August 2021	Various	5	France; Germany; ~~Russia~~^{1} Slovenia; Spain; Serbia
2021 FIBA Under-16 Women's Americas Championship	23–29 August 2021	(Mexico) León	4	United States; Canada; Mexico; Argentina
2021 FIBA U16 Women's African Championship	7–15 August 2021	(Egypt) Cairo	2	Mali; Egypt
2022 FIBA Under-16 Women's Asian Championship	24–30 June 2022	(Jordan) Amman	4	Australia; Japan; South Korea; New Zealand
Total			16	

^{1} Russia was excluded due to the 2022 Russian invasion of Ukraine and was replaced by Serbia.

== Draw ==
The draw took place on 22 March 2022.

=== Seeding ===
Pot 1 Team United States Canada France Hungary	Pot 2 Team Germany Slovenia Spain Belgium	Pot 3 Team Australia Japan South Korea New Zealand	Pot 4 Team Mexico Argentina Mali Egypt

== Preliminary round ==
All times are local (UTC+2).

=== Group A ===
Pos	Team	Pld	W	L	PF	PA	PD	Pts
1	Hungary (H)	3	3	0	205	130	+75	6
2	Belgium (Note: Belgium replaced Serbia, which had previously replaced Russia.)	3	2	1	191	155	+36	5
3	Japan	3	1	2	189	179	+10	4
4	Mexico	3	0	3	119	240	−121	3

Source: FIBA
Rules for classification: 1) Points; 2) Head-to-head results; 3) Points difference; 4) Points scored.
(H) Hosts
Notes:

9 July 2022
17:30

Boxscore

Hungary	55–39	Belgium
Scoring by quarter: 13–7, 15–12, 12–8, 15–12
Pts: Tomán 15; Rebs: Aho, Kastl 9 Asts: Bajzáth 6		Pts: Bruyndoncx 12; Rebs: Mukeba-Kasanda 12; Asts: Bayart 3

Főnix Hall, Debrecen
Attendance: 150
Referees: Felipe Ibarra (CHI), Diego Chiconato (BRA), Marion Ortis (FRA)

9 July 2022
19:30

Boxscore

Mexico	40–77	Japan
Scoring by quarter: 14–25, 5–20, 7–16, 14–16
Pts: Cardona, Yañez 8 Rebs: Yañez 16; Asts: Zazueta 3		Pts: Sasaki 14; Rebs: Oue 12; Asts: Kadowaki, Shimoda 4

Oláh Gábor Sports Hall, Debrecen
Attendance: 35
Referees: Michał Proc (POL), Norval Young (IVB), Micaela Prado (ARG)

10 July 2022
17:30

Boxscore

Japan	55–79	Hungary
Scoring by quarter: 18–19, 11–24, 15–17, 11–19
Pts: Higashi 17; Rebs: Oue 6 Asts: Yagi 3		Pts: Tomán 23; Rebs: Kastl, Strausz 7 Asts: Aho 7

Főnix Hall, Debrecen
Attendance: 100
Referees: Beniamino Attard (ITA), Alan Dos Santos (BRA), Jacquiline Dover (AUS)

10 July 2022
20:00

Boxscore

Belgium	92–43	Mexico
Scoring by quarter: 22–11, 11–17, 31–9, 28–6
Pts: Bruyndoncx 20; Rebs: Bayart, Mukeba-Kasanda 9 Asts: Courthiau 7		Pts: Navarro 12; Rebs: Cardona 5 Asts: Mejía, Mendoza 2

Főnix Hall, Debrecen
Attendance: 70
Referees: Carsten Straube (GER), Vladimir Jevtović (SRB), Aline García (URU)

12 July 2022
17:30

Boxscore

Mexico	36–71	Hungary
Scoring by quarter: 5–13, 10–20, 10–13, 11–25
Pts: Zazueta 14; Rebs: Mora 6 Asts: Navarro 3		Pts: Gábor 14; Rebs: Tomán 8 Asts: Bajzáth 7

Főnix Hall, Debrecen
Attendance: 280
Referees: Blaž Zupančič (SLO), Jacquiline Dover (AUS), Lee Ji-youn (KOR)

12 July 2022
17:30

Boxscore

Belgium	60–57	Japan
Scoring by quarter: 11–23, 20–11, 13–14, 16–9
Pts: Bayart, Daelemans 15; Rebs: Mukeba-Kasanda 9 Asts: Bruyndoncx 5		Pts: Ueno 22; Rebs: Yagi 10; Asts: Mitsugi 3

Oláh Gábor Sports Hall, Debrecen
Attendance: 0
Referees: Kristian Páez (ECU), Waseem Husainy (CAN), Diego Chiconato (BRA)

=== Group B ===
Pos	Team	Pld	W	L	PF	PA	PD	Pts
1	France	3	3	0	268	157	+111	6
2	Slovenia	3	2	1	216	219	−3	5
3	Australia	3	1	2	213	208	+5	4
4	Argentina	3	0	3	124	237	−113	3

Source: FIBA
Rules for classification: 1) Points; 2) Head-to-head results; 3) Points difference; 4) Points scored.

9 July 2022
12:00

Boxscore

Australia	81–87 (OT)	Slovenia
Scoring by quarter: 21–19, 20–15, 16–16, 17–24, Overtime: 7–13
Pts: Shiels 18; Rebs: Juffermans 15; Asts: Shiels 8		Pts: Sivka 20; Rebs: Barthelme 9 Asts: Žitek 5

Oláh Gábor Sports Hall, Debrecen
Attendance: 40
Referees: Esperanza Mendoza (ESP), Aya Ahmed (EGY), Özge Şentürk (TUR)

9 July 2022
14:30

Boxscore

France	98–35	Argentina
Scoring by quarter: 26–9, 27–9, 23–12, 22–5
Pts: Malonga 21; Rebs: Malonga 10; Asts: Ferre 6		Pts: three players 7 Rebs: Amaya 4 Asts: López 3

Oláh Gábor Sports Hall, Debrecen
Attendance: 50
Referees: Waseem Husainy (CAN), Péter Praksch (HUN), Mbaye Seye (SEN)

10 July 2022
12:30

Boxscore

Argentina	44–66	Australia
Scoring by quarter: 12–19, 9–12, 11–14, 12–21
Pts: López 12; Rebs: López 10; Asts: Bourgarel, López 5		Pts: Clark 11; Rebs: Juffermans 11; Asts: Petrie 5

Főnix Hall, Debrecen
Attendance: 50
Referees: Michał Proc (POL), Blaž Zupančič (SLO), Lee Ji-youn (KOR)

10 July 2022
15:00

Boxscore

Slovenia	56–93	France
Scoring by quarter: 9–22, 21–26, 14–25, 12–20
Pts: Valančič 11; Rebs: Marolt 7 Asts: Bartelme 8		Pts: Cleante 19; Rebs: Angloma, Malonga 7 Asts: Dursus 6

Főnix Hall, Debrecen
Attendance: 100
Referees: Gvidas Gedvilas (LTU), Norval Young (IVB), James Griguol (AUS)

12 July 2022
12:30

Boxscore

Argentina	45–73	Slovenia
Scoring by quarter: 8–21, 14–14, 10–17, 13–21
Pts: Giacone 14; Rebs: Fontana 7 Asts: Giacone 3		Pts: Barthelme, Žitek 11; Rebs: Barthelme 11; Asts: Barthelme 11

Oláh Gábor Sports Hall, Debrecen
Attendance: 40
Referees: Carsten Straube (GER), Sofiane Si Youcef (ALG), Kumiko Kumagai (JPN)

12 July 2022
12:30

Boxscore

Australia	66–77	France
Scoring by quarter: 17–21, 12–23, 18–18, 19–15
Pts: Petrie 15; Rebs: Juffermans, Laditan 8 Asts: Shiels 4		Pts: Dursus 22; Rebs: Malonga 10; Asts: Malonga, Cleante 4

Főnix Hall, Debrecen
Attendance: 50
Referees: Felipe Ibarra (CHI), Jelena Smiljanic (SRB), Mbaye Seye (SEN)

=== Group C ===
Pos	Team	Pld	W	L	PF	PA	PD	Pts
1	Spain	3	3	0	238	157	+81	6
2	Canada	3	2	1	216	162	+54	5
3	Egypt	3	1	2	167	226	−59	4
4	South Korea	3	0	3	183	259	−76	3

Source: FIBA
Rules for classification: 1) Points; 2) Head-to-head results; 3) Points difference; 4) Points scored.

9 July 2022
12:30

Boxscore

Egypt	75–73	South Korea
Scoring by quarter: 17–12, 9–21, 28–18, 21–22
Pts: Sallman 27; Rebs: Sallman 12; Asts: El-Alfy 4		Pts: Kim Sol 20; Rebs: Heo, Seo 6 Asts: Heo 7

Főnix Hall, Debrecen
Attendance: 10
Referees: Gvidas Gedvilas (LTU), James Griguol (AUS), Jacquiline Dover (AUS)

9 July 2022
15:00

Boxscore

Canada	57–60	Spain
Scoring by quarter: 15–17, 16–18, 11–16, 15–9
Pts: Prosper 14; Rebs: Fournier 15; Asts: Gibb, Prosper 3		Pts: Martín Carrión 12; Rebs: Fam Thiam 8 Asts: Martín Carrión 8

Főnix Hall, Debrecen
Attendance: 50
Referees: Carsten Straube (GER), Alan Dos Santos (BRA), Amel Dahra (FRA)

10 July 2022
12:00

Boxscore

South Korea	58–92	Canada
Scoring by quarter: 12–20, 16–26, 13–27, 17–19
Pts: Heo 11; Rebs: Seo 4 Asts: Cho, Ko 3		Pts: Fournier 32; Rebs: Fournier 17; Asts: Gibb 8

Oláh Gábor Sports Hall, Debrecen
Attendance: 35
Referees: Jelena Smiljanic (SRB), Péter Praksch (HUN), Marion Ortis (FRA)

10 July 2022
14:30

Boxscore

Spain	86–48	Egypt
Scoring by quarter: 18–10, 22–6, 26–16, 20–16
Pts: Fam Thiam 16; Rebs: Mata 9 Asts: Martín Carrión 5		Pts: El-Alfy 15; Rebs: Sallman 5 Asts: Korchied 2

Oláh Gábor Sports Hall, Debrecen
Attendance: 45
Referees: Kristian Páez (ECU), Amel Dahra (FRA), Mbaye Seye (SEN)

12 July 2022
15:00

Boxscore

Egypt	44–67	Canada
Scoring by quarter: 6–17, 20–15, 11–14, 7–21
Pts: El-Alfy 15; Rebs: Ahmed, Sallman 8 Asts: El-Shebshery 3		Pts: Fournier 13; Rebs: Fournier, Prosper 14; Asts: Prawl 5

Oláh Gábor Sports Hall, Debrecen
Attendance: 42
Referees: Beniamino Attard (ITA), Micaela Prado (ARG), Marek Kúkelčík (SVK)

12 July 2022
15:00

Boxscore

Spain	92–52	South Korea
Scoring by quarter: 22–19, 17–13, 29–10, 24–10
Pts: Mata, Viegas 13; Rebs: Mata 11; Asts: Conesa 6		Pts: Ko 19; Rebs: Ko 9 Asts: Ko 8

Főnix Hall, Debrecen
Attendance: 40
Referees: Gvidas Gedvilas (LTU), Vladimir Jevtović (SRB), Aline García (URU)

=== Group D ===
Pos	Team	Pld	W	L	PF	PA	PD	Pts
1	United States	3	3	0	266	123	+143	6
2	Germany	3	2	1	163	165	−2	5
3	New Zealand	3	1	2	130	228	−98	4
4	Mali	3	0	3	151	194	−43	3

Source: FIBA
Rules for classification: 1) Points; 2) Head-to-head results; 3) Points difference; 4) Points scored.

9 July 2022
17:30

Boxscore

Germany	68–35	New Zealand
Scoring by quarter: 12–4, 13–10, 20–10, 23–11
Pts: Soltau 14; Rebs: Rolf 13; Asts: Byvatov, Rolf 2		Pts: Pateman 9 Rebs: three players 8 Asts: Lacey-Rameka, Taulelei 2

Oláh Gábor Sports Hall, Debrecen
Attendance: 38
Referees: Beniamino Attard (ITA), Marek Kúkelčík (SVK), Aline García (URU)

9 July 2022
20:00

Boxscore

United States	78–49	Mali
Scoring by quarter: 25–13, 25–15, 10–10, 18–11
Pts: Randolph 12; Rebs: Booker 9 Asts: Williams 5		Pts: Touré 14; Rebs: Touré 8 Asts: three players 2

Főnix Hall, Debrecen
Attendance: 80
Referees: Kristian Páez (ECU), Jelena Smiljanic (SRB), Kumiko Kumagai (JPN)

10 July 2022
17:00

Boxscore

Mali	44–55	Germany
Scoring by quarter: 6–8, 9–15, 14–21, 15–11
Pts: Coulibaly 13; Rebs: Touré 8 Asts: Samassekou 3		Pts: Rolf 15; Rebs: Rolf 14; Asts: Scheu 3

Oláh Gábor Sports Hall, Debrecen
Attendance: 40
Referees: Esperanza Mendoza (ESP), Waseem Husainy (CAN), Micaela Prado (ARG)

10 July 2022
19:30

Boxscore

New Zealand	34–102	United States
Scoring by quarter: 12–12, 9–23, 5–28, 8–39
Pts: Jones 13; Rebs: Tamilo 7 Asts: Leger-Walker 2		Pts: Hidalgo 16; Rebs: Cunningham 10; Asts: Cheli, Randolph 3

Oláh Gábor Sports Hall, Debrecen
Attendance: 0
Referees: Felipe Ibarra (CHI), Aya Ahmed (EGY), Sofiane Si Youcef (ALG)

12 July 2022
20:00

Boxscore

Germany	40–86	United States
Scoring by quarter: 7–21, 12–26, 9–16, 12–23
Pts: Soltau 19; Rebs: Soltau 8 Asts: Scheu 3		Pts: Cunningham 14; Rebs: Watkins 10; Asts: Cambridge 5

Főnix Hall, Debrecen
Attendance: 100
Referees: Esperanza Mendoza (ESP), James Griguol (AUS), Özge Şentürk (TUR)

12 July 2022
20:00

Boxscore

Mali	58–61	New Zealand
Scoring by quarter: 18–10, 6–13, 22–18, 12–20
Pts: Berthe 16; Rebs: Sarr 12; Asts: Samassekou 5		Pts: Cameron 18; Rebs: Tamilo 15; Asts: Brown 6

Oláh Gábor Sports Hall, Debrecen
Attendance: 0
Referees: Michał Proc (POL), Péter Praksch (HUN), Marion Ortis (FRA)

== Final round ==
=== Bracket ===
Round of 16
13 July
Hungary	82
Argentina	53
13 July
Canada	70
New Zealand	36
13 July
Japan	64
Slovenia	58
13 July
South Korea	29
United States	114
13 July
Belgium	46
Australia	63
13 July
Spain	62
Mali	56
13 July
Mexico	39
France	86
13 July
Egypt	46
Germany	61

Quarter-finals
15 July
Hungary	49
Canada	70
15 July
Japan	38
United States	112
15 July
Australia	51
Spain	62
15 July
France	63
Germany	40

Semi-finals
16 July
Canada	57
United States	87
16 July
Spain	66
France	59

Final
17 July
United States	84
Spain	62
Third place
17 July
Canada	82
France	84

=== Round of 16 ===
13 July 2022
12:00

Boxscore

Mexico	39–86	France
Scoring by quarter: 7–24, 9–28, 9–14, 14–20
Pts: Mendoza 9 Rebs: Mendoza 5 Asts: Navarro 3		Pts: Malonga 14; Rebs: Kane 8 Asts: Cleante 6

Oláh Gábor Sports Hall, Debrecen
Attendance: 35
Referees: Felipe Ibarra (CHI), Sofiane Si Youcef (ALG), Kumiko Kumagai (JPN)

13 July 2022
12:30

Boxscore

Belgium	46–63	Australia
Scoring by quarter: 12–12, 13–24, 10–17, 11–10
Pts: Bruyndoncx 12; Rebs: Bayart 11; Asts: three players 2		Pts: Juffermans 15; Rebs: Petrie 12; Asts: Laditan 3

Főnix Hall, Debrecen
Attendance: 50
Referees: Gvidas Gedvilas (LTU), Alan Dos Santos (BRA), Amel Dahra (FRA)

13 July 2022
14:30

Boxscore

Japan	64–58	Slovenia
Scoring by quarter: 16–18, 16–8, 16–11, 16–21
Pts: Yagi 15; Rebs: Yagi 7 Asts: Mitsugi 6		Pts: Žitek 5 Rebs: Barthelme 8 Asts: Barthelme 4

Oláh Gábor Sports Hall, Debrecen
Attendance: 60
Referees: Esperanza Mendoza (ESP), Waseem Husainy (CAN), Vladimir Jevtović (SRB)

13 July 2022
15:00

Boxscore

Canada	70–36	New Zealand
Scoring by quarter: 15–4, 18–11, 19–10, 18–11
Pts: Maria 17; Rebs: Prosper 9 Asts: three players 2		Pts: Tamilo 8 Rebs: Taulelei 12; Asts: Cameron 3

Főnix Hall, Debrecen
Attendance: 30
Referees: Kristian Páez (ECU), Jacquiline Dover (AUS), Özge Şentürk (TUR)

13 July 2022
17:00

Boxscore

Spain	62–56	Mali
Scoring by quarter: 17–12, 14–12, 17–21, 14–11
Pts: Martín Carrión 20; Rebs: Fam Thiam 11; Asts: Martín Carrión 5		Pts: Berthe 13; Rebs: Touré 10; Asts: Samassekou 4

Oláh Gábor Sports Hall, Debrecen
Attendance: 70
Referees: Beniamino Attard (ITA), Lee Ji-youn (KOR), Aya Ahmed (EGY)

13 July 2022
17:30

Boxscore

Hungary	82–53	Argentina
Scoring by quarter: 22–13, 22–15, 21–8, 17–17
Pts: Tomán 21; Rebs: Gábor 5 Asts: Bajzáth 5		Pts: López 14; Rebs: Hentschel 6 Asts: Amaya 5

Főnix Hall, Debrecen
Attendance: 200
Referees: Blaž Zupančič (SLO), Norval Young (IVB), Marion Ortis (FRA)

13 July 2022
19:30

Boxscore

Egypt	46–61	Germany
Scoring by quarter: 14–18, 9–15, 11–14, 12–14
Pts: El-Alfy 15; Rebs: El-Alfy 13; Asts: Metwally 3		Pts: Soltau 33; Rebs: Soltau 14; Asts: Scheu 7

Oláh Gábor Sports Hall, Debrecen
Attendance: 60
Referees: Michał Proc (POL), Jelena Smiljanic (SRB), Diego Chiconato (BRA)

13 July 2022
20:00

Boxscore

South Korea	29–114	United States
Scoring by quarter: 14–39, 6–30, 6–24, 3–21
Pts: Ko 7 Rebs: Ko 6 Asts: Ko 2		Pts: Cunningham 14; Rebs: Umeh 15; Asts: Williams 6

Főnix Hall, Debrecen
Attendance: 140
Referees: Carsten Straube (GER), Péter Praksch (HUN), Marek Kúkelčík (SVK)

=== 9–16th classification playoffs ===
Classification quarterfinals
15 July
Argentina	58
New Zealand	65
15 July
Slovenia	92
South Korea	61
15 July
Belgium	55
Mali	59
15 July
Mexico	57
Egypt	67

Classification semifinals
16 July
New Zealand	49
Slovenia	83
16 July
Mali	58
Egypt	44

Ninth place match
17 July
Slovenia	75
Mali	66
Eleventh place match
17 July
New Zealand	47
Egypt	69

Classification semifinals
16 July
Argentina	55
South Korea	68
16 July
Belgium	88
Mexico	42

13th place match
17 July
South Korea	35
Belgium	81
15th place match
17 July
Argentina	68
Mexico	55

==== 9–16th place quarterfinals ====
15 July 2022
12:00

Boxscore

Mexico	57–67	Egypt
Scoring by quarter: 7–20, 12–11, 15–19, 23–17
Pts: Yañez 13; Rebs: Yañez 15; Asts: Mendoza 4		Pts: El-Shebshery 21; Rebs: Sallman 13; Asts: Metwally 6

Oláh Gábor Sports Hall, Debrecen
Attendance: 35
Referees: James Griguol (AUS), Özge Şentürk (TUR), Mbaye Seye (SEN)

15 July 2022
14:30

Boxscore

Belgium	55–59	Mali
Scoring by quarter: 18–20, 16–13, 17–10, 4–16
Pts: Benoit 16; Rebs: Mukeba-Kasanda 10; Asts: Daelemans 7		Pts: Sarr 14; Rebs: Sarr 7 Asts: Samassekou 4

Oláh Gábor Sports Hall, Debrecen
Attendance: 40
Referees: Vladimir Jevtović (SRB), Sofiane Si Youcef (ALG), Micaela Prado (ARG)

15 July 2022
17:00

Boxscore

Argentina	58–65	New Zealand
Scoring by quarter: 19–15, 11–12, 16–16, 12–22
Pts: Maggi 13; Rebs: López 9 Asts: Amaya 4		Pts: Tamilo 15; Rebs: Jones 10; Asts: Cameron 5

Oláh Gábor Sports Hall, Debrecen
Attendance: 22
Referees: Michał Proc (POL), Jelena Smiljanic (SRB), Marek Kúkelčík (SVK)

15 July 2022
19:30

Boxscore

Slovenia	92–61	South Korea
Scoring by quarter: 24–14, 27–13, 19–16, 25–18
Pts: Sivka 19; Rebs: Bartelme 7 Asts: Sivka 6		Pts: Heo 16; Rebs: Lee 7 Asts: Lee 4

Oláh Gábor Sports Hall, Debrecen
Attendance: 40
Referees: Beniamino Attard (ITA), Jacquiline Dover (AUS), Aya Ahmed (EGY)

==== 13–16th place semifinals ====
16 July 2022
12:00

Boxscore

Belgium	88–42	Mexico
Scoring by quarter: 27–10, 27–8, 19–12, 15–12
Pts: Bruyndoncx 17; Rebs: Bayart 14; Asts: Battiston 5		Pts: Zazueta 8 Rebs: Zazueta 6 Asts: Mendoza 2

Oláh Gábor Sports Hall, Debrecen
Attendance: 26
Referees: Amel Dahra (FRA), Diego Chiconato (BRA), Aline García (URU)

16 July 2022
14:30

Boxscore

Argentina	55–68	South Korea
Scoring by quarter: 10–24, 13–21, 11–16, 21–7
Pts: López 11; Rebs: López 9 Asts: Amaya, Fontana 2		Pts: Kim Sol 19; Rebs: Ko 9 Asts: Heo 9

Oláh Gábor Sports Hall, Debrecen
Attendance: 25
Referees: Norval Young (IVB), James Griguol (AUS), Kumiko Kumagai (JPN)

==== 15th place game ====
17 July 2022
10:00

Boxscore

Argentina	68–55	Mexico
Scoring by quarter: 15–16, 18–9, 16–19, 19–11
Pts: Maggi 21; Rebs: Amaya, Giacone 9 Asts: Amaya 7		Pts: Zazueta 16; Rebs: Mendoza 8 Asts: Navarro 4

Oláh Gábor Sports Hall, Debrecen
Attendance: 25
Referees: Blaž Zupančič (SLO), Alan Dos Santos (BRA), Mbaye Seye (SEN)

==== 13th place game ====
17 July 2022
12:30

Boxscore

South Korea	35–81	Belgium
Scoring by quarter: 15–18, 6–22, 6–26, 8–15
Pts: Heo 14; Rebs: Ko 8 Asts: five players 1		Pts: Bayart 18; Rebs: Mukeba-Kasanda 14; Asts: Courthiau, Hucorne 6

Oláh Gábor Sports Hall, Debrecen
Attendance: 15
Referees: Marek Kúkelčík (SVK), Norval Young (BVI), Sofiane Si Youcef (ALG)

==== 9–12th place semifinals ====
16 July 2022
17:00

Boxscore

Mali	58–44	Egypt
Scoring by quarter: 25–14, 12–14, 11–5, 10–11
Pts: Berthe 14; Rebs: Mam. Doumbia 14; Asts: Mab. Doumbia 3		Pts: El-Alfy 13; Rebs: El-Alfy 12; Asts: Metwally 7

Oláh Gábor Sports Hall, Debrecen
Attendance: 30
Referees: Micaela Prado (ARG), Marek Kúkelčík (SVK), Alan Dos Santos (BRA)

16 July 2022
19:30

Boxscore

New Zealand	49–83	Slovenia
Scoring by quarter: 11–28, 10–20, 12–14, 16–21
Pts: Brown, Williams 13; Rebs: Brown 6 Asts: Cameron, Jones 2		Pts: Žitek 23; Rebs: Sivka 8 Asts: Štirn 6

Oláh Gábor Sports Hall, Debrecen
Attendance: 55
Referees: Waseem Husainy (CAN), Mbaye Seye (SEN), Lee Ji-youn (KOR)

==== Eleventh place game ====
17 July 2022
15:00

Boxscore

New Zealand	47–69	Egypt
Scoring by quarter: 8–22, 6–14, 18–13, 15–20
Pts: Jones 18; Rebs: Tamilo 10; Asts: three players 2		Pts: El-Alfy 32; Rebs: El-Alfy 26; Asts: three players 3

Oláh Gábor Sports Hall, Debrecen
Attendance: 27
Referees: Vladimir Jevtović (SRB), Diego Chiconato (BRA), Lee Ji-youn (KOR)

==== Ninth place game ====
17 July 2022
17:30

Boxscore

Slovenia	75–66	Mali
Scoring by quarter: 18–19, 13–16, 19–10, 25–21
Pts: Valančič 18; Rebs: Žitek 8 Asts: Žitek 7		Pts: Berthe 31; Rebs: Mam. Doumbia 12; Asts: Mam. Doumbia, Samassekou 3

Oláh Gábor Sports Hall, Debrecen
Attendance: 43
Referees: Felipe Ibarra (CHI), Özge Şentürk (TUR), Aya Ahmed (EGY)

=== Quarterfinals ===
15 July 2022
12:30

Boxscore

Australia	51–62	Spain
Scoring by quarter: 14–19, 10–19, 13–13, 14–11
Pts: Juffermans, Petrie 12; Rebs: Juffermans 12; Asts: Shiels 3		Pts: Fam Thiam, Valero 12; Rebs: Fam Thiam 17; Asts: Martín Carrión 7

Főnix Hall, Budapest
Attendance: 120
Referees: Felipe Ibarra (CHI), Waseem Husainy (CAN), Blaž Zupančič (SLO)

15 July 2022
15:00

Boxscore

France	63–40	Germany
Scoring by quarter: 20–4, 16–7, 16–11, 11–18
Pts: Malonga 16; Rebs: Malonga 8 Asts: Dursus, Salahy 3		Pts: Soltau 11; Rebs: Djuela, Fox 6 Asts: three players 2

Főnix Hall, Budapest
Attendance: 50
Referees: Gvidas Gedvilas (LTU), Péter Praksch (HUN), Aline García (URU)

15 July 2022
17:30

Boxscore

Hungary	49–70	Canada
Scoring by quarter: 18–19, 9–14, 11–19, 11–18
Pts: Dobo 14; Rebs: Strausz 7 Asts: Bajzáth 6		Pts: Prosper 21; Rebs: Fournier 14; Asts: Gibb 3

Főnix Hall, Debrecen
Attendance: 400
Referees: Esperanza Mendoza (ESP), Carsten Straube (GER), Alan Dos Santos (BRA)

15 July 2022
20:00

Boxscore

Japan	38–112	United States
Scoring by quarter: 7–43, 12–30, 9–18, 10–21
Pts: Higashi 13; Rebs: Kadowaki 5 Asts: Shimoda 2		Pts: Watkins 25; Rebs: Watkins 9 Asts: Cambridge 7

Főnix Hall, Budapest
Attendance: 100
Referees: Kristian Páez (ECU), Amel Dahra (FRA), Norval Young (IVB)

=== 5–8th classification playoffs ===
Classification semifinals
16 July
Hungary	67
Japan	45
16 July
Australia	75
Germany	72

Fifth place match
17 July
Hungary	52
Australia	72
Seventh place match
17 July
Japan	50
Germany	59

==== 5–8th place semifinals ====
16 July 2022
12:30

Boxscore

Australia	75–72	Germany
Scoring by quarter: 21–21, 16–19, 22–14, 16–18
Pts: Clark 15; Rebs: Juffermans 10; Asts: Shiels 5		Pts: Soltau 27; Rebs: Soltau 8 Asts: Soltau 4

Főnix Hall, Debrecen
Attendance: 30
Referees: Esperanza Mendoza (ESP), Jelena Smiljanic (SRB), Marion Ortis (FRA)

16 July 2022
15:00

Boxscore

Hungary	67–45	Japan
Scoring by quarter: 24–7, 17–10, 20–13, 6–15
Pts: Aho 12; Rebs: Dobó 7 Asts: Tomán 5		Pts: Yagi 15; Rebs: Oue, Ueno 5 Asts: Shibata, Shimoda 2

Főnix Hall, Debrecen
Attendance: 150
Referees: Michał Proc (POL), Blaž Zupančič (SLO), Özge Şentürk (TUR)

==== Seventh place game ====
17 July 2022
12:30

Boxscore

Japan	50–59	Germany
Scoring by quarter: 14–22, 11–10, 13–14, 12–13
Pts: Higashi 16; Rebs: Oue 8 Asts: Shimoda 3		Pts: Soltau 18; Rebs: Rolf 14; Asts: Scheu 3

Főnix Hall, Debrecen
Attendance: 30
Referees: Beniamino Attard (ITA), James Griguol (AUS), Marion Ortis (FRA)

==== Fifth place game ====
17 July 2022
15:00

Boxscore

Hungary	52–72	Australia
Scoring by quarter: 13–19, 12–14, 23–21, 4–18
Pts: Strausz 13; Rebs: three players 4 Asts: Bajzáth 3		Pts: Juffermans 20; Rebs: Petrie 9 Asts: Shiels 10

Főnix Hall, Debrecen
Attendance: 200
Referees: Kristian Páez (ECU), Amel Dahra (FRA), Aline García (URU)

=== Semifinals ===
16 July 2022
17:30

Boxscore

Spain	66–59	France
Scoring by quarter: 11–20, 15–13, 17–15, 23–11
Pts: Martín Carrión 20; Rebs: Fam Thiam 9 Asts: Martín Carrión 7		Pts: Malonga 21; Rebs: Malonga 14; Asts: Cleante, Saulnier 5

Főnix Hall, Debrecen
Attendance: 200
Referees: Beniamino Attard (ITA), Kristian Páez (ECU), Jacquiline Dover (AUS)

16 July 2022
20:00

Boxscore

Canada	57–87	United States
Scoring by quarter: 9–27, 17–18, 16–22, 15–20
Pts: Prosper 11; Rebs: Prosper 10; Asts: Maria 5		Pts: Randolph 14; Rebs: Watkins 9 Asts: Cambridge 7

Főnix Hall, Debrecen
Attendance: 150
Referees: Felipe Ibarra (CHI), Péter Praksch (HUN), Vladimir Jevtović (SRB)

=== Third place game ===
17 July 2022
17:30

Boxscore

Canada	82–84	France
Scoring by quarter: 20–23, 17–22, 25–18, 20–21
Pts: Gibb 25; Rebs: Fournier 7 Asts: Gibb, Prosper 5		Pts: Malonga 28; Rebs: Malonga 17; Asts: Salahy 5

Főnix Hall, Debrecen
Attendance: 150
Referees: Esperanza Mendoza (ESP), Péter Praksch (HUN), Jacquiline Dover (AUS)

=== Final ===
17 July 2022
20:00

Boxscore

United States	84–62	Spain
Scoring by quarter: 24–13, 12–13, 21–18, 27–18
Pts: Cambridge 16; Rebs: Cunningham 10; Asts: Cambridge 9		Pts: Martín Carrión 14; Rebs: Fam Thiam 8 Asts: Martín Carrión 8

Főnix Hall, Debrecen
Attendance: 800
Referees: Gvidas Gedvilas (LTU), Carsten Straube (GER), Waseem Husainy (CAN)

== Final ranking ==
Rank	Team	Record
Gold medal	United States	7–0
Silver medal	Spain	6–1
Bronze medal	France	6–1
4th	Canada	4–3
5th	Australia	4–3
6th	Hungary	5–2
7th	Germany	4–3
8th	Japan	2–5
9th	Slovenia	5–2
10th	Mali	2–5
11th	Egypt	3–4
12th	New Zealand	2–5
13th	Belgium	4–3
14th	South Korea	1–6
15th	Argentina	1–6
16th	Mexico	0–7

== Statistics and awards ==
=== Statistical leaders ===
==== Players ====
Points

Name	PPG
(Germany) Annika Soltau	20.3
(France) Dominique Malonga	18.0
(Egypt) Jana El-Alfy	16.4
(France) Marine Dursus	14.7
(Canada) Cassandre Prosper	14.0

Rebounds

Name	RPG
(Canada) Toby Fournier	11.4
(Egypt) Jana El-Alfy	11.0
(Australia) Isla Juffermans	10.6
(France) Dominique Malonga	10.0
(Spain) Awa Fam	9.9

Assists

Name	APG
(Spain) Iyana Martín Carrión	6.1
(Slovenia) Lea Bartelme	5.6
(United States) Jaloni Cambridge	5.1
(Hungary) Lili Bajzáth	4.9
(Australia) Saffron Shiels	4.9

Blocks

Name	BPG
(New Zealand) Ritorya Tamilo	3.1
(Canada) Cassandre Prosper	3.0
(Egypt) Jana Sallman	2.3
(Canada) Toby Fournier	2.1
(Australia) Isla Juffermans	2.1

Steals

Name	SPG
(Canada) Cassandre Prosper	4.6
(France) Inès Salahy	3.3
(Mali) Mariam Sarr	3.1
(United States) Morgan Cheli	3.0
(France) Marine Dursus	3.0
(South Korea) Kim Soo-in	3.0

Efficiency

Name	EFFPG
(France) Dominique Malonga	22.4
(Canada) Toby Fournier	19.4
(Canada) Cassandre Prosper	19.3
(Spain) Awa Fam	18.4
(Belgium) Pauline Benoit	18.1
(Egypt) Jana El-Alfy	18.1

==== Teams ====
Points

Team	PPG
United States	94.7
France	80.0
Slovenia	74.9
Canada	70.7
Spain	70.0

Rebounds

Team	RPG
United States	57.3
Belgium	52.9
Canada	49.9
Germany	49.6
Australia	48.9

Assists

Team	APG
United States	24.3
France	20.7
Slovenia	20.3
Hungary	19.6
Belgium	19.0

Blocks

Team	BPG
Belgium	6.4
Canada	6.4
Egypt	5.6
Hungary	5.4
New Zealand	5.1

Steals

Team	SPG
United States	20.7
Canada	16.4
South Korea	15.6
France	15.3
Mali	14.7

Efficiency

Team	EFFPG
United States	124.7
France	97.0
Canada	81.4
Belgium	79.6
Slovenia	79.1

=== Awards ===
The awards were announced on 17 July 2022.

Position	Player
All-Tournament Team	(Spain) Iyana Martín Carrión
All-Tournament Team	(United States) JuJu Watkins
All-Tournament Team	(United States) Jaloni Cambridge
All-Tournament Team	(Canada) Cassandre Prosper
All-Tournament Team	(France) Dominique Malonga
MVP	(United States) JuJu Watkins
