= Jaloni Cambridge =

American basketball player (born 2005)

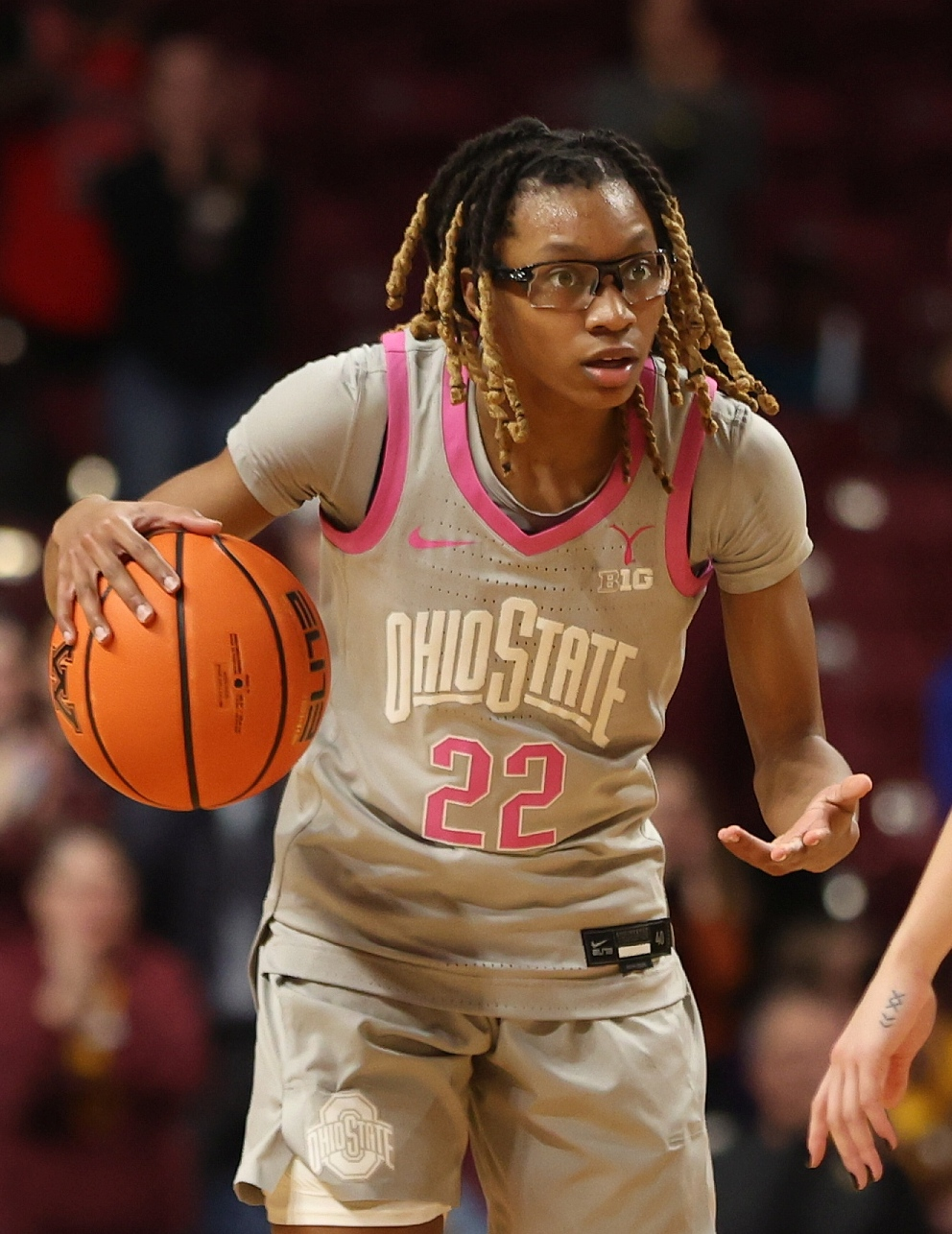
- Cambridge with Ohio State in 2026

No. 22 – Ohio State Buckeyes
- Position: Guard
- League: Big Ten Conference

Personal information
- Born: November 19, 2005 (age 20)
- Listed height: 5 ft 7 in (1.70 m)

Career information
- High school: The Ensworth School (Nashville, Tennessee); Montverde Academy (Montverde, Florida)
- College: Ohio State (2024–present)

Career highlights
- Dawn Staley Award (2026); WBCA Coaches' All-American (2026); Second-team All-American – AP, USBWA (2026); Big Ten Freshman of the Year (2025); Big Ten All-Freshman Team (2025); 2× First-team All-Big Ten (2025, 2026); MaxPreps National Player of the Year (2024); McDonald's All-American (2024); Nike Hoop Summit (2024); Jordan Brand Classic (2024); 3× Division II AA Tennessee Miss Basketball (2021–2023)
Medals
Women's basketball
Representing the United States
FIBA Under-17 World Cup
Gold medal – first place	2022 Hungary	Team
FIBA Under-16 Americas Championship
Gold medal – first place	2021 Mexico	Team

Jaloni Cambridge (born November 19, 2005) is an American college basketball player for the Ohio State Buckeyes of the Big Ten Conference. She attended Montverde Academy and was a five-star recruit and one of the top players in the 2024 class.

== Early life and high school career ==
Cambridge began her high school career at The Ensworth School in Nashville, Tennessee. She started on the high school varsity team as an eighth grader. During her sophomore year she averaged 17.3 points, 6.4 rebounds, 3.8 steals and 3.1 assists per game. She was named the Division II-AA state tournament MVP after leading the Lady Tigers to the 2022 TSSAA state championship. During her junior year she averaged 26.9 points, 7.6 rebounds, 4.3 steals and 3.8 assists per game in 30 games, and led the Lady Tigers to the Division II-AA state championship game for the second consecutive year. She scored a career-high 41 points in the state championship game, however Ensworth lost the game 59–64. Following the season she was named Tennessee Gatorade Player of the Year.

She was named a three-time Division II-AA Tennessee Miss Basketball winner and a three-time Tennessean Girls Basketball Player of the Year. On June 30, 2023, she transferred to Montverde Academy in Montverde, Florida. During her senior year, she averaged 20.7 points, 9.0 assists, 7.3 rebounds and 3.7 steals per game. During the semifinals of the 2024 Chipotle High School Nationals championship against No. 1 ranked Long Island Lutheran she had a game-high 33 points, and scored the game-winning buzzer-beating shot. During the championship game against IMG Academy she scored 17 points to help Montverde Academy win their third consecutive Chipotle Nationals championship. Following the season she was named Florida Gatorade Player of the Year, and the MaxPreps National Basketball Player of the Year. She was also named a finalist for the Gatorade National Player of the Year and Naismith High School Player of the Year awards. She was named to the 2024 McDonald's All-American Girls Game.

=== Recruiting ===
Cambridge was considered a five-star recruit and was the number-three ranked basketball player in the class of 2024 by ESPN. On December 29, 2023, she committed to play college basketball at Ohio State, where she will join her sister Kennedy. Other finalists she was considering included Baylor, Florida, Georgia, Louisville, LSU and South Carolina.

== College career ==
During her freshman year she averaged 16.0 points, 3.88 assists and 2.12 steals per game. She was one of only eight players in the conference to record more than one 30-point game this season. She led the conference with four Big Ten Freshman of the Week honors. Following the season she was named Big Ten Freshman of the Year, first-team All-Big Ten, and all-Big Ten freshman teams.

During her sophomore year she averaged 23.4 points, and 4.6 assists per game. On January 7, 2026, she scored a career-high 41 points against Illinois. She became the first Buckeye to score 40 points in a game against a Big Ten opponent since Kelsey Mitchell scored 43 against Rutgers on March 4, 2016. She led the league in free throws made per game (4.3), ranked third in field goals made per game (8.6), tied for eighth in assists per game (4.6) and tied for tenth in steals per game (1.9). She scored in double figures in all 33 games for the Buckeyes. With 19 points against Oregon on February 8, 2026, she became the 40th player in program history to reach 1,000 career points. During the final game of the regular season she became the fifth player in program history to score 700 points in a season. She finished the regular season as the Big Ten scoring champion and was named a unanimous first-team All-Big Ten honoree. She was also named a second-team All-American by the AP, and the U.S. Basketball Writers Association (USBWA), and earned third-team honors from The Sporting News.

== National team career ==
On June 7, 2022, Cambridge was named to the United States' roster to compete at the 2022 FIBA Under-17 Women's Basketball World Cup. During the tournament she averaged 9.4 points, 3.9 rebounds, and a team-high 5.1 assists per game and won a gold medal. During the gold medal game against Spain she scored a team-high 16 points, six rebounds, nine assists and one steal. She was subsequently named to the All-Tournament Team.

== Personal life ==
Cambridge's father, Desmond Cambridge, played college basketball at Alabama A&M. She has six siblings, Desmond Jr., Devan, Jalon, Jasiah, Jordyn and Kennedy. All of her siblings also played basketball.

In April 2025, Cambridge was invited to Kelsey Plum's Dawg Class, an Under Armour-sponsored camp to help top college athletes transition from collegiate to professional basketball.

== Career statistics ==
Legend
GP	Games played	GS	Games started	MPG	Minutes per game	RPG	Rebounds per game
APG	Assists per game	SPG	Steals per game	BPG	Blocks per game	PPG	Points per game
TO	Turnovers per game	FG%	Field-goal percentage	3P%	3-point field-goal percentage	FT%	Free-throw percentage
**Bold**	Career best	°	League leader

=== College ===
Year	Team	GP	GS	MPG	FG%	3P%	FT%	RPG	APG	SPG	BPG	TO	PPG
2024–25	Ohio State	29	29	27.3	42.9	31.0	73.9	4.5	3.9	2.0	0.2	2.7	15.4
**Career**		29	29	27.3	42.9	31.0	73.9	4.5	3.9	2.0	0.2	2.7	15.4
Statistics retrieved from Sports-Reference.
