= Preston Public School =

School district in Oklahoma, United States

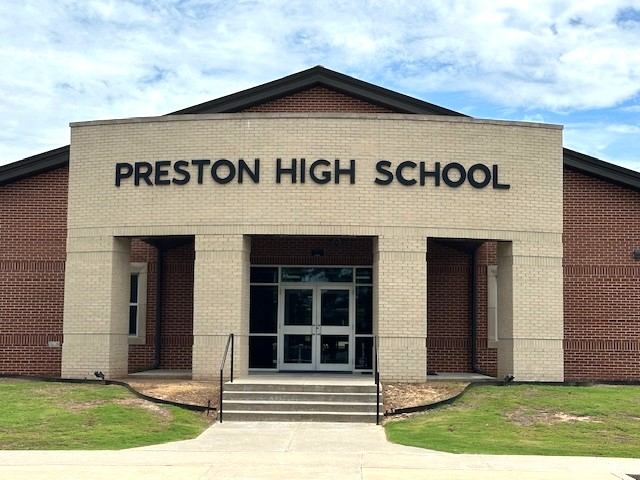
Preston High School in 2025

Preston Public School is a school district in Preston, unincorporated Okmulgee County, Oklahoma. It includes an elementary/junior high school campus and a Preston High School campus. It serves approximately 700 students.
