= JuJu Watkins =

American basketball player (born 2005)

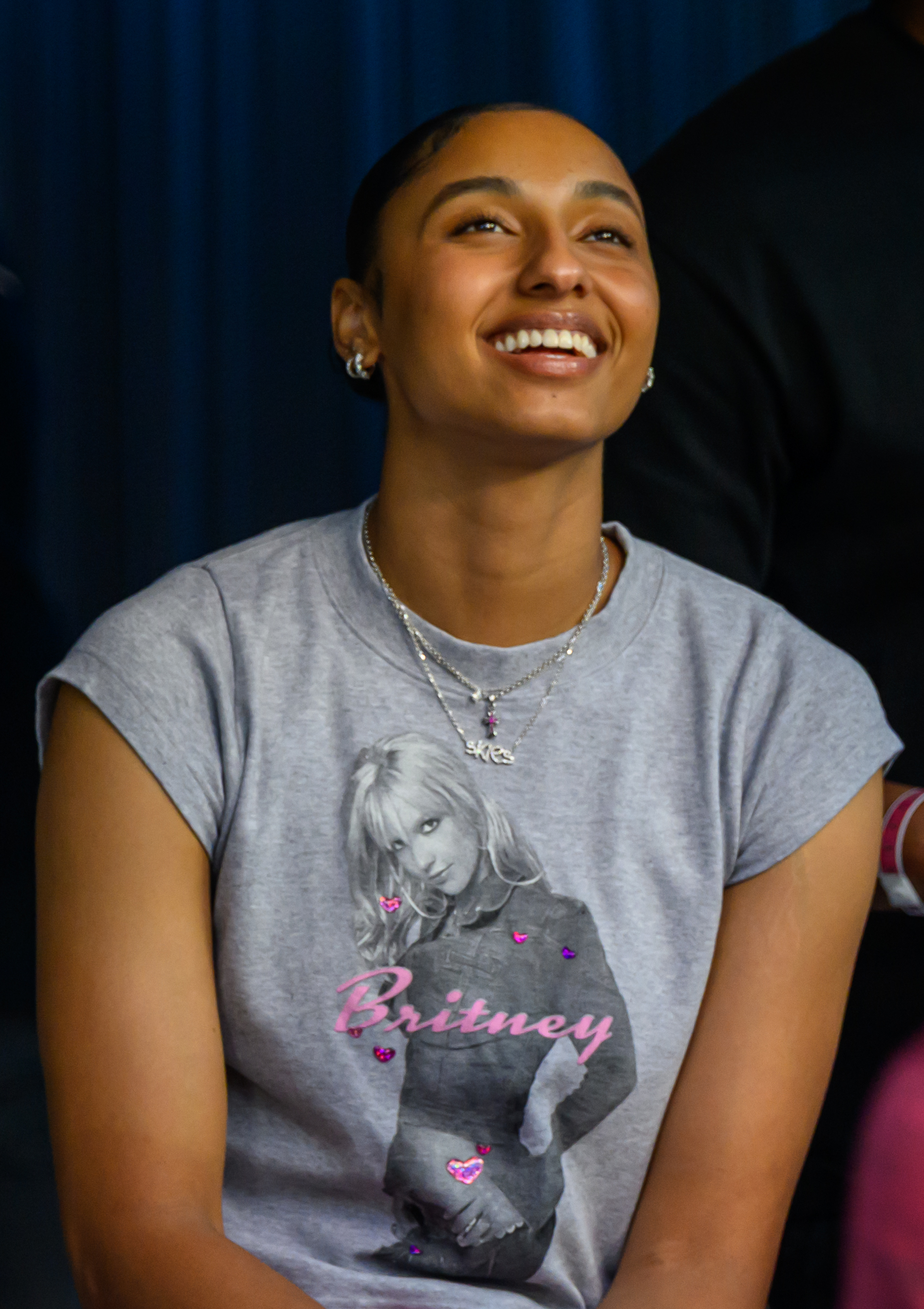
- Watkins in 2025

No. 12 – USC Trojans
- Position: Shooting guard / point guard
- League: Big Ten Conference

Personal information
- Born: July 15, 2005 (age 21) Los Angeles, California, U.S.
- Listed height: 6 ft 2 in (1.88 m)

Career information
- High school: Windward School (Los Angeles); Sierra Canyon (Los Angeles)
- College: USC (2023–present)

Career highlights
- John R. Wooden Award (2025); Dawn Staley Award (2025); AP Player of the Year (2025); Naismith College Player of the Year (2025); USBWA National Player of the Year (2025); 2× consensus first-team All-American (2024, 2025); 2× Ann Meyers Drysdale Award (2024, 2025); USBWA National Freshman of the Year (2024); WBCA Freshman of the Year (2024); Big Ten Female Athlete of the Year (2025); All-Pac-12 Team (2024); Gatorade National Player of the Year (2023); Naismith Prep Player of the Year (2023); 2× MaxPreps National Player of the Year (2022, 2023); McDonald's All-American Game Co-MVP (2023); Nike Hoop Summit (2023); FIBA Under-17 Women's World Cup MVP (2022); FIBA Under-16 Americas Championship MVP (2021)
Medals
Women's basketball
Representing the United States
FIBA Under-17 World Cup
Gold medal – first place	2022 Hungary	Team
FIBA Under-16 Americas Championship
Gold medal – first place	2021 Mexico	Team

Judea Skies "JuJu" Watkins (born July 15, 2005) is an American college basketball player for the USC Trojans of the Big Ten Conference.

Watkins attended Windward School and Sierra Canyon School, both in her hometown of Los Angeles. She was ranked the number one recruit in her class by ESPN and earned national high school player of the year honors as a senior at Sierra Canyon. In her first season at USC, Watkins was named a unanimous first-team All-American and won the Ann Meyers Drysdale Award. She received national freshman of the year recognition and set the NCAA Division I freshman scoring record.

Watkins has won two gold medals with the United States at the youth international level. She was named Most Valuable Player of the 2022 FIBA Under-17 World Cup and the 2021 FIBA Under-16 Americas Championship.

== Early life ==
Watkins started playing basketball in a park league at age seven. She has trained with former National Basketball Association (NBA) assistant coach Phil Handy and modeled her game after Arike Ogunbowale. As a freshman at Windward School in Los Angeles, Watkins averaged 21 points and nine rebounds per game, leading her team to the CIF Southern Section Open Division title game and the regional final. She was named the Los Angeles Times Player of the Year. In 2020, Watkins was named SportsKid of the Year by Sports Illustrated Kids. As a sophomore at Windward, she averaged 27 points and 12 rebounds per game.

Entering her junior year, Watkins transferred to Sierra Canyon School in Los Angeles. She led her team to the Open Division state title and a 30–2 record as a junior. After averaging 25 points, 10.6 rebounds and 3.2 assists, Watkins was named California Gatorade Player of the Year and Ms. Basketball. She earned player of the year honors from the Los Angeles Times and Los Angeles Daily News. As a senior, Watkins averaged 27.3 points, 13.8 rebounds and 3.6 assists per game, leading Sierra Canyon to the CIF Southern Section Open Division title, a 31–1 record and the regional final. On senior night, she scored a career-high 60 points, the second-most points in a game in area history, in an 88–39 win over Notre Dame High School. Watkins was recognized as Gatorade National Player of the Year and Naismith Prep Player of the Year. She repeated as player of the year from the Los Angeles Times and Los Angeles Daily News, as well as California Gatorade Player of the Year and Ms. Basketball. Watkins played in the McDonald's All-American Game, where she shared MVP honors, and the Nike Hoop Summit.

=== Recruiting ===
Watkins was considered a five-star recruit and the number one player in the 2023 class, according to ESPN. On November 15, 2022, she announced her commitment to USC over offers from South Carolina and Stanford.

== College career ==
=== Freshman season ===
On November 6, 2023, Watkins made her college debut and scored 32 points in an 83–74 upset win over AP No. 7 Ohio State. She set the USC record for points in a freshman debut, surpassing Lisa Leslie from 1990. On November 22, she posted her first double-double with 31 points and 12 rebounds in a 71–70 win over Penn State. It was the first of three consecutive 30-point games by Watkins, which tied Cheryl Miller for the longest such streak in program history. On January 14, 2024, Watkins recorded 32 points and 10 rebounds in a 73–65 win over AP No. 2 UCLA. On February 2, she scored a career-high 51 points and grabbed 11 rebounds in a 67–58 victory over AP No. 4 Stanford. Watkins broke the USC single-game scoring record held by Cherie Nelson since 1989. It was the first 50-point game by an NCAA Division I freshman since Elena Delle Donne of Delaware in 2010. On February 23, Watkins scored 42 points in an 87–81 win over AP No. 11 Colorado. She set the single-game scoring record for the Galen Center, her team's home arena, and had her 11th 30-point game, eclipsing Cheryl Miller for the most in a season by a USC player. In her next game, Watkins posted 30 points, seven rebounds and five assists in a 74–68 loss to AP No. 18 Utah, passing Paula McGee for the program freshman single-season scoring record. At the end of the regular season, she was named Pac-12 Freshman of the Year and All-Pac-12, while earning All-Defensive Team honors from the league's media.

In the semifinals of the 2024 Pac-12 tournament, Watkins posted 33 points and 10 rebounds in an 80–70 double overtime win over UCLA. She set the tournament single-game scoring record by a freshman. Although Watkins was held to nine points on 2-of-15 shooting in the final, her team defeated Stanford, 67–58, to win its first Pac-12 tournament since 2014. She led USC to the Elite Eight of the 2024 NCAA tournament, where she had 29 points and 10 rebounds in an 80–73 loss to UConn. During the game, Watkins broke the Division I freshman scoring record, held by Tina Hutchinson of San Diego State since 1984. As a freshman, she averaged 27.1 points, 7.3 rebounds, 3.3 assists, and 2.3 steals per game, ranking second among Division I players in scoring. Watkins was a unanimous first-team All-American: she earned first-team All-American accolades from the AP and the United States Basketball Writers Association (USBWA), and made the Women's Basketball Coaches Association (WBCA) Coaches' All-America team. She received the Ann Meyers Drysdale Award as the nation's top shooting guard, and was named the top Division I Freshman of the Year by the USBWA and the WBCA.

=== Sophomore season ===
Entering her sophomore season, Watkins was named an AP preseason All-American and the Big Ten preseason player of the year. In her season debut on November 4, 2024, she posted 27 points, 10 rebounds, and five blocks in a 68–66 win over AP No. 20 Ole Miss. On November 15, Watkins became the fastest USC player to reach 1,000 career points (38 games) and tied for the fourth-fewest games in Division I history to reach the mark, as part of a 22-point effort against Santa Clara. On December 3, she scored a season-high 40 points and shot 9-of-11 from three-point range in a 94–52 victory over California Baptist, breaking the program single-game record in three-pointers. On December 21, Watkins led USC to a 72–70 win against AP No. 4 UConn, with 25 points, six rebounds, and five assists. On January 12, 2025, she posted 35 points on 13-of-15 shooting, 11 rebounds, and five steals in a 95–73 win over Penn State. Watkins led USC to a 71–60 victory over undefeated, AP No. 1 UCLA on February 13, recording 38 points, 11 rebounds, eight blocks, and five assists. She became the first Division I player in 20 seasons with at least 35 points, five blocks, and five assists in a game. On March 1, Watkins scored 30 points in a rematch with AP No. 2 UCLA, helping her team win 80–67 and clinch the Big Ten regular season championship.

On March 24, 2025, USC announced that Watkins had torn the anterior cruciate ligament (ACL) in her right knee during a game against Mississippi State during the second-round of the 2025 NCAA Tournament. The injury and subsequent surgery effectively ended her sophomore season, where she was the nation's fourth-leading scorer.

She was named Women's National Player of the Year by the USBWA, along with being named the Naismith College Player of the Year for the 2024–25 season. Watkins was also the winner of the 2025 John R. Wooden Award. Watkins was chosen over fellow finalists Madison Booker of Texas, Hannah Hidalgo of Notre Dame, Lauren Betts of UCLA, and Paige Bueckers of UConn. She was named the Ann Meyers Drysdale Shooting Guard of the Year, becoming the first ever back to back winner of the prestigious award.

=== Junior season ===
On September 29, 2025, it was announced that Watkins would be sitting out for the 2025-2026 basketball season due to her ACL injury.

== National team career ==
Watkins won a gold medal with the United States at the 2021 FIBA Under-16 Americas Championship in Mexico. She averaged 20 points, 5.7 rebounds, 5.2 steals and 3.7 assists per game, earning tournament MVP honors. At the 2022 FIBA Under-17 World Cup in Hungary, Watkins led her team to the gold medal and was named MVP after averaging 13.1 points, 6.4 rebounds, 2.4 assists and 2.3 steals per game.

== Career statistics ==
Legend
GP	Games played	GS	Games started	MPG	Minutes per game	RPG	Rebounds per game
APG	Assists per game	SPG	Steals per game	BPG	Blocks per game	PPG	Points per game
TO	Turnovers per game	FG%	Field-goal percentage	3P%	3-point field-goal percentage	FT%	Free-throw percentage
**Bold**	Career best	°	League leader

=== College ===
Year	Team	GP	GS	MPG	FG%	3P%	FT%	RPG	APG	SPG	BPG	TO	PPG
2023–24	USC	**34**	**34**	**34.6**	.401	.319	**.852**	**7.3**	3.3	**2.3**	1.6	4.1	**27.1**
2024–25	USC	33	33	33.8	**.426**	**.325**	.820	6.8	**3.4**	2.2	**1.8**	**3.2**	23.9
2025–26	USC	Did not play due to injury											
Career		67	67	34.2	.412	.322	.836	7.0	3.4	2.2	1.7	3.7	25.5

== Personal life ==
Watkins is the daughter of Robert Neal-Watkins and Sari Watkins. She has three siblings: Mali, Dami, and Mar. Her great-grandfather, Ted Watkins, founded the Watts Labor Community Action Committee. Ted Watkins remains an inspiration in Juju's life, "I feel like my family, my great grandfather and my grandfather, have done so much for the community that it inspires me to want to take that step and really use my platform for something bigger than just basketball."

She lists her family as a main source of motivation in her basketball career and life. Watkins also emphasizes the importance of community. Juju is an active member in her community, she told CBS Sports "From a philanthropy aspect, I try to be as active as I can."

=== Endorsements ===
In 2022, as a high school junior, Watkins signed with Klutch Sports Group, becoming the first female athlete to be represented by the agency. Later that year, she signed a name, image and likeness (NIL) deal with Nike. In October 2024, Watkins signed a multi-year contract extension with Nike, described by ESPN as one of the largest shoe deals in women's basketball. She has also signed NIL deals with AT&T, Celsius, Dove, Gatorade, NerdWallet, Ritz, State Farm, and Wells Fargo among other companies. Watkins has invested in the women's three-on-three basketball league Unrivaled. She is estimated to be one of the highest-earning women's college basketball players from NIL deals and was named Best NIL Athlete by Sports Business Journal in 2024.
