= 2027 FIBA U16 Women's AmeriCup (South American qualifiers) =

International youth basketball tournament

Tournament details
- Host country: Venezuela
- City: La Asunción
- Dates: 11–15 November 2026
- Teams: 6 (from 1 sub-confederation)
- Venue: 1 (in 1 host city)

Final positions
- Champions: Colombia (1st title)
- Runners-up: Venezuela
- Third place: Ecuador

Tournament statistics
- Games played: 15

Official website
- www.fiba.basketball

The South American leg of the 2027 FIBA U16 Women's AmeriCup qualifiers marked the first edition of this competition. The South American qualifiers replaced the FIBA U15 Women's South American Championship and, unlike the previous format, they do not include the top South American teams. Therefore, Argentina and Brazil did not participate in this tournament, having already secured direct qualification for the 2027 FIBA U16 Women's AmeriCup based on the historical ranking.

The tournament was played at Gimnasio Ciudad in La Asunción (Margarita Island), Venezuela, from 11 to 15 November 2026. In this tournament, U15 national teams competed to qualify for next year's FIBA U16 Women's AmeriCup, with the winning team qualifying directly, while the second berth may be awarded depending on the designation of the host nation for the continental tournament, which will be announced at a later date.

Colombia won the tournament and qualified for the 2027 FIBA U16 Women's AmeriCup.

== Participating teams ==
- Chile
- Colombia
- Ecuador
- Paraguay
- Uruguay
- Venezuela

== Tournament format ==
All teams played a round-robin tournament in a single group. The final standings of the group also determined the final standings of the tournament.

== Final standings ==
Pos	Team	Pld	W	L	PF	PA	PD	Pts	Qualification
1st place, gold medalist(s)	Colombia	5	5	0	338	243	+95	10	2027 FIBA U16 Women's AmeriCup
2nd place, silver medalist(s)	Venezuela (H)	5	3	2	264	252	+12	8	Possible 2027 FIBA U16 Women's AmeriCup
3rd place, bronze medalist(s)	Ecuador	5	3	2	286	269	+17	8	
4	Uruguay	5	2	3	274	269	+5	7	
5	Paraguay	5	1	4	259	298	−39	6	
6	Chile	5	1	4	194	284	−90	6	

Source: FIBA
(H) Hosts

== Match results ==
All times are local (Venezuelan Standard Time; UTC−4).

11 November 2026
14:30

Boxscore

Colombia	67–34	Chile
Scoring by quarter: 28–8, 17–7, 19–11, 3–8

Gimnasio Ciudad de la Asunción

11 November 2026
17:00

Boxscore

Paraguay	46–72	Uruguay
Scoring by quarter: 15–24, 6–19, 14–14, 11–15

Gimnasio Ciudad de la Asunción

11 November 2026
19:30

Boxscore

Ecuador	67–73	Venezuela
Scoring by quarter: 12–20, 23–20, 13–17, 19–16

Gimnasio Ciudad de la Asunción

12 November 2026
14:30

Boxscore

Uruguay	60–76	Colombia
Scoring by quarter: 12–21, 17–17, 13–7, 18–31

Gimnasio Ciudad de la Asunción

12 November 2026
17:00

Boxscore

Chile	39–55	Ecuador
Scoring by quarter: 7–17, 10–14, 12–14, 10–10

Gimnasio Ciudad de la Asunción

12 November 2026
19:30

Boxscore

Venezuela	49–47	Paraguay
Scoring by quarter: 19–12, 8–10, 9–10, 13–15

Gimnasio Ciudad de la Asunción

13 November 2026
14:30

Boxscore

Ecuador	40–62	Colombia
Scoring by quarter: 14–11, 12–18, 10–14, 4–19

Gimnasio Ciudad de la Asunción

13 November 2026
17:00

Boxscore

Paraguay	56–37	Chile
Scoring by quarter: 13–13, 5–10, 17–7, 21–7

Gimnasio Ciudad de la Asunción

13 November 2026
19:30

Boxscore

Venezuela	38–46	Uruguay
Scoring by quarter: 8–11, 9–6, 10–13, 11–16

Gimnasio Ciudad de la Asunción

14 November 2026
14:30

Boxscore

Uruguay	48–56	Ecuador
Scoring by quarter: 11–7, 5–15, 15–8, 17–26

Gimnasio Ciudad de la Asunción

14 November 2026
17:00

Boxscore

Colombia	72–63	Paraguay
Scoring by quarter: 18–15, 14–13, 20–12, 20–23

Gimnasio Ciudad de la Asunción

14 November 2026
19:30

Boxscore

Chile	31–58	Venezuela
Scoring by quarter: 8–11, 3–12, 9–13, 11–22

Gimnasio Ciudad de la Asunción

15 November 2026
13:30

Boxscore

Chile	53–48	Uruguay
Scoring by quarter: 17–7, 16–10, 13–13, 7–18

Gimnasio Ciudad de la Asunción

15 November 2026
16:00

Boxscore

Ecuador	68–47	Paraguay
Scoring by quarter: 16–18, 19–9, 16–7, 17–13

Gimnasio Ciudad de la Asunción

15 November 2026
18:30

Boxscore

Venezuela	46–61	Colombia
Scoring by quarter: 15–7, 5–13, 7–27, 19–14

Gimnasio Ciudad de la Asunción
