= 2020 FIBA Under-17 Women's Basketball World Cup =

Tournament details
- Host country: Romania
- Teams: 16 (from 5 confederations)
- Venues: 2 (in 1 host city)

Official website
- www.fiba.basketball

The 2020 FIBA Under-17 Women's Basketball World Cup (Romanian: Cupa mondială de baschet feminin FIBA sub-17 ani 2020) would have been an international basketball competition to be held in Cluj-Napoca, Romania. It would have been the sixth edition of the FIBA Under-17 Women's Basketball World Cup. Sixteen national teams were scheduled to compete in the tournament. It was originally scheduled to take place from 15 to 23 August 2020, but on 12 June, FIBA postponed the tournament due to the COVID-19 pandemic and options were examined to play in 2021, but the tournament was eventually cancelled.

== Qualified teams ==
Means of qualification	Date	Venue	Berths	Qualifiers
Host nation		(Ivory Coast) Abidjan	1	Romania
2019 FIBA Under-16 Women's Americas Championship	16–22 June 2019	(Chile) Puerto Aysén	4	United States; Canada; Chile; Puerto Rico
2019 FIBA Under-16 Women's African Championship	20 July – 3 August 2019	(Rwanda) Kigali	2	Mali; Egypt
2019 FIBA U16 Women's European Championship	22–30 August 2019	(North Macedonia) Skopje	5	Russia; Lithuania; Spain; France; Italy
2019 FIBA Under-16 Women's Asian Championship (cancelled)	5–10 April 2020	(Australia) Canberra	4	Australia; China; Japan; South Korea
Total			16	

== Draw ==
The draw for the tournament was held on 4 March 2020 in Cluj-Napoca, Romania.

=== Seedings ===
The seedings were announced on 4 March 2020.

Pot 1	Pot 2	Pot 3	Pot 4
Romania (hosts); United States; Canada; Russia	Spain; Lithuania; France; Italy	Japan; Australia; China; South Korea	Chile; Egypt; Mali; Puerto Rico

== Preliminary round ==
=== Group A ===
Pos	Team	Pld	W	L	PF	PA	PD	Pts
1	Italy	0	0	0	0	0	0	0
2	Canada	0	0	0	0	0	0	0
3	South Korea	0	0	0	0	0	0	0
4	Egypt	0	0	0	0	0	0	0

First match(es) will be played: TBD. Source: FIBA
Rules for classification: 1) Points; 2) Head-to-head results; 3) Points difference; 4) Points scored.

=== Group B ===
Pos	Team	Pld	W	L	PF	PA	PD	Pts
1	Mali	0	0	0	0	0	0	0
2	United States	0	0	0	0	0	0	0
3	Australia	0	0	0	0	0	0	0
4	Spain	0	0	0	0	0	0	0

First match(es) will be played: TBD. Source: FIBA
Rules for classification: 1) Points; 2) Head-to-head results; 3) Points difference; 4) Points scored.

=== Group C ===
Pos	Team	Pld	W	L	PF	PA	PD	Pts
1	Lithuania	0	0	0	0	0	0	0
2	Russia	0	0	0	0	0	0	0
3	Japan	0	0	0	0	0	0	0
4	Chile	0	0	0	0	0	0	0

First match(es) will be played: TBD. Source: FIBA
Rules for classification: 1) Points; 2) Head-to-head results; 3) Points difference; 4) Points scored.

=== Group D ===
Pos	Team	Pld	W	L	PF	PA	PD	Pts
1	Romania (H)	0	0	0	0	0	0	0
2	France	0	0	0	0	0	0	0
3	China	0	0	0	0	0	0	0
4	Puerto Rico	0	0	0	0	0	0	0

First match(es) will be played: TBD. Source: FIBA
Rules for classification: 1) Points; 2) Head-to-head results; 3) Points difference; 4) Points scored.
(H) Hosts

== Final round ==
=== Bracket ===
Round of 16
A1
B4
C2
D3
A3
B2
C4
D1
A2
B3
C1
D4
A4
B1
C3
D2

Quarter-finals

Semi-finals

Final
Third place

=== 9–16th classification playoffs ===
Classification quarterfinals

Classification semifinals

Ninth place match
Eleventh place match

Classification semifinals

13th place match
15th place match

=== 5–8th classification playoffs ===
Classification semifinals

Fifth place match
Seventh place match

== Final ranking ==
Rank	Team	Record
Gold medal		
Silver medal		
Bronze medal		
4th		
5th		
6th		
7th		
8th		
9th		
10th		
11th		
12th		
13th		
14th		
15th		
16th		
