= Blanca Quiñónez =

Ecuadorian basketball player (born 2006)

No. 4 – UConn Huskies
- Position: Forward
- League: Big East Conference

Personal information
- Born: August 3, 2006 (age 19) Milagro, Ecuador
- Listed height: 6 ft 2 in (1.88 m)

Career information
- College: UConn (2025–present)
- Playing career: 2020–present

Career history
- 2020–2025: Magnolia Campobasso

Career highlights
- Big East Freshman of the Year (2026); Big East All-Second Team (2026); Big East Sixth Player of the Year (2026); Serie A1 Best Young Player (2022)
Medals
Women's basketball
Representing Ecuador
FIBA U15 South American Championship
Silver medal – second place	2018 Chile	Team

Blanca Francheska Quiñónez Mina (born August 3, 2006) is an Ecuadorian college basketball player for the UConn Huskies. She previously played for Magnolia Campobasso in Italy, making her professional debut at age 14.

== Early life ==
Blanca Francheska Quiñónez Mina was born on August 3, 2006, in Milagro, Ecuador. She began playing basketball at age five after attending a local summer camp alongside her twin brother and older brother. Quiñónez grew up trying many sports, such as soccer, karate, swimming, and boxing, as well as other activities like dance and modeling, but excelled on the basketball court. She started out playing in the Liga Deportiva Cantonal de Milagro. Quiñónez quickly developed into one of the most skilled players in Guayas Province. At age 11, she was named the best player at a national under-15 tournament, which earned her her first call-up to the junior national team.

Quiñónez attracted attention from multiple clubs after her MVP performance in the 2019 FIBA U16 Americas Championship. She and her mother then traveled to Italy in October 2019 to attend a trial period with Magnolia Campobasso, practicing with both the under-15 and senior squads. They chose Magnolia because it was the only club to allow her mother to accompany her.

== Early professional career ==
Quiñónez officially signed with Magnolia Campobasso in January 2020 at the age of 13, initially joining their youth developmental team, Cestistica Campobasso. A few days after her 14th birthday, she was promoted to the senior team in the Lega Basket Femminile (LBF) for the 2020–21 season. Quiñónez made her professional debut on December 6, 2020, recording four points and six rebounds in a 49–70 home loss to San Martino di Lupari. She became the youngest foreign player in LBF history at 14 years, four months, and three days old.

Ahead of her second season, Quiñónez said: "My intention remains the same: I want to always be able to give my best, gain experience, and grow." She made her EuroCup debut at the age of 15 on September 25, 2021, posting 17 points and four rebounds in a 65–64 qualification round victory over Spanish club Ensino Lugo. That season, Quiñónez averaged 7.1 points per game and won the Lega Basket Femminile (LBF) Best Young Player award while playing small forward, receiving the news while she was at school. In 2023–24, she averaged 10.4 points, 3.1 rebounds, 2.1 assists, and 2.1 steals per game, helping Magnolia Campobasso advance to the LBF semifinals for the first time. Quiñónez re-signed with the club ahead of her fifth pro season. In her final season in Italy in 2024–25, she averaged 11.0 points, 3.5 rebounds, and 2.2 steals per game, leading her team to a third-place finish in the regular season and a semifinal appearance in the playoffs. The team also reached the Coppa Italia semifinal and the EuroCup round of 32.

Aside from the first team, Quiñónez also starred for Magnolia Campobasso's reserve team in the third-tier Serie B. Additionally, she helped the club win the Italian under-17 championship in 2023, scoring 29 points in the final and earning tournament MVP honors. The following year, she helped them win the Italian under-19 championship and again won tournament MVP after scoring 22 points in the final. Quiñónez earned invites to participate in the 2022 NBA Academy Games in Atlanta and the 2024 Basketball Without Borders Global girls camp in Phoenix, Arizona, with the latter event marking her first time visiting the U.S.

== College career ==
Quiñónez opened her college recruitment in April 2024 after watching that year's Final Four and the overall growth of women's college basketball in the United States. According to CT Insider, "the floodgates immediately burst open" with interest from many of the top NCAA Division I programs in the country. On October 2, 2024, Quiñónez verbally committed to playing college basketball at the University of Connecticut for the UConn Huskies, becoming the first player in program history from South America. She made her choice without having visited the campus. Quiñónez signed with the Huskies the following month, although this was not officially announced until February 11, 2025. After one practice with the team, she received praise from head coach Geno Auriemma, who said that she was "fun to watch because she's unpredictable".

Quiñónez missed the first two games of her freshman season due to injury, after which she made her collegiate debut on November 12, 2025, recording five points, three assists, and two steals in an 85–31 blowout win over Loyola–Chicago. She then tallied 18 points, four rebounds, and two steals against Ohio State in her second game, and was subsequently named the Big East Freshman of the Week. A week later, Quiñónez scored 21 points on eight-of-11 shooting and grabbed five rebounds in a 93–41 win over Utah, and repeated as the Big East Freshman of the Week. In mid-December, she won the award for a third time after posting 12 points, four rebounds, and four steals in 79–51 win over AP No. 16 USC. Quiñónez won it again the following week after she put up 12 points and four rebounds against Marquette, followed by 10 points, five assists, five steals, and four rebounds versus No. 11 Iowa, with the Huskies routing both opponents. On December 29, she was named the Big East Freshman of the Week for the third straight week, and the fifth time overall, after tallying 12 points, three rebounds, and three steals in a 94–47 win over Butler. Quiñónez nabbed the award again two weeks later after averaging 14.5 points, 3.5 rebounds, and 3.5 steals per game in blowout wins over St. John's and Creighton.

== National team career ==
Quiñónez won a silver medal with the Ecuador national under-15 team at the 2018 FIBA U15 South American Championship, averaging 7.0 points and 4.4 rebounds per game. She later competed at the 2019 FIBA U16 Americas Championship, where she averaged 14.2 points and 3.8 rebounds per game, as well as the 2019 U14 South American Championship held in Ecuador, where she averaged 21 points per game.

Quiñónez debuted for the Ecuador senior national team at the 2022 FIBA South American Championship, averaging 10.5 points and 4.5 rebounds per game.

== Personal life ==
Quiñónez is the daughter of Guillermo and Fabiola Quiñónez. Her twin brother, Jaime, is a footballer in Ecuador.

Quiñónez speaks Spanish, English, Italian, as well as the Molisan dialect. She remained in Italy during the onset of the COVID-19 pandemic until she was able to get a humanitarian flight to Ecuador in July 2020 with the help of the embassy. In 2025, Quiñónez graduated from the Mario Pagano School, a liceo scientifico in Italy.

Quiñónez was signed as a brand ambassador for sports apparel company Airdom in 2024.
