= Peru women's national under-15 basketball team =

Peru
- FIBA zone: FIBA Americas
- National federation: Federación Deportiva Peruana de Basketball

U17 World Cup
- Appearances: None

U16 AmeriCup
- Appearances: None

U15 South American Championship
- Appearances: 13–19 (Note: Data from 1987, 1990, 1998, 1999, 2000 and 2001 championships are not available)
- Medals: (bronze) Bronze: 4 (1992, 1994, 1996, 1997)

The Peru women's national under-15 basketball team is a national basketball team of Peru, administered by the Peru Basketball Federation (Spanish: Federación Deportiva Peruana de Basketball) (F.D.P.B.). It represents the country in international under-15 women's basketball competitions.

Currently, Peru is not a member of FIBA.

== FIBA South America Under-15 Championship for Women participations ==
Year	Result
1992	3rd place, bronze medalist(s)
1994	3rd place, bronze medalist(s)
1996	3rd place, bronze medalist(s)
1997	3rd place, bronze medalist(s)
2004	6th
2005	6th
2006	4th

Year	Result
2007	7th
2010	6th
2011	7th
2012	4th
2014	8th
2016	7th

== See also ==
- Peru women's national basketball team
- Peru women's national under-17 basketball team
- Peru men's national under-15 basketball team
