= 2019 FIBA Under-16 Women's Americas Championship =

International women's basketball competition

6th FIBA Under-16 Women's Americas Basketball Championship

Tournament details
- Host country: Chile
- City: Puerto Aysén
- Dates: 16–22 June
- Teams: 8 (from 1 confederation)
- Venue: 1 (in 1 host city)

Final positions
- Champions: United States (5th title)
- Runners-up: Canada
- Third place: Chile

Tournament statistics
- MVP: (United States) Payton Verhulst
- Top scorer: (Chile) Fernanda Ovalle: 17.8
- Top rebounds: (Mexico) Mariana Valenzuela: 15.3
- Top assists: (United States) Olivia Miles: 7.5
- PPG (Team): (United States) USA: 103.0
- RPG (Team): (United States) USA: 63.2
- APG (Team): (United States) USA: 26.5

Official website
- Official website

The 2019 FIBA Under-16 Women's Americas Championship was an international basketball competition held in Puerto Aysén, Chile from 16–22 June 2019. It was the sixth edition of the FIBA Under-16 Women's Americas Championship, and the first to be hosted in Chile.

The United States to reclaim the championship, after defeated Canada 87–37 in the final game. Meanwhile, the hosts Chile edged Puerto Rico in the bronze medal game, 59–49. The top four teams qualified for the 2020 FIBA Under-17 Women's Basketball World Cup in Romania.

== Venue ==
| Puerto Aysén | 2019 FIBA Under-16 Women's Americas Championship is located in Chile |
| Polideportivo 21 de Abril | 2019 FIBA Under-16 Women's Americas Championship is located in Chile |
| Capacity: 2,000 | 2019 FIBA Under-16 Women's Americas Championship is located in Chile |

== Qualified teams ==
- North America
  - Canada
  - United States
- South America: 2018 FIBA U15 Women's South American Championship in Puerto Aysén, Chile, from 29 October to 3 November 2018
  - Chile (host)
  - Ecuador
  - Brazil
- Central America:
  - Mexico
  - Puerto Rico
  - El Salvador

== Draw ==
The draw was held on 30 April 2019 in San Juan, Puerto Rico.

| Pot 1 | Pot 2 | Pot 3 | Pot 4 |
|---|---|---|---|
| Canada; United States | Brazil; Mexico | Ecuador; El Salvador | Chile; Puerto Rico |

== Group phase ==
All times are local (UTC–4).

=== Group A ===
| Pos | Team | Pld | W | L | PF | PA | PD | Pts | Qualification |
|---|---|---|---|---|---|---|---|---|---|
| 1 | Canada | 3 | 3 | 0 | 240 | 112 | +128 | 6 | Quarterfinals |
| 2 | Puerto Rico | 3 | 1 | 2 | 149 | 184 | −35 | 4 (Note: Puerto Rico 1–1, +8PD; Ecuador 1–1, +3PD; Brazil 1–1, –11PD) | Quarterfinals |
| 3 | Ecuador | 3 | 1 | 2 | 143 | 186 | −43 | 4 | Quarterfinals |
| 4 | Brazil | 3 | 1 | 2 | 156 | 206 | −50 | 4 | Quarterfinals |

Source: FIBA
Notes:

16 June 2019
13:15

Boxscore

| Ecuador | 33–79 | Canada |
Scoring by quarter: 3–11, 8–17, 13–28, 9–23
| Pts: Quiñónez 12; Rebs: Vaicekauskas 6 Asts: Quiñónez 3 | | Pts: Stupar 11; Rebs: Alexander 10; Asts: Lee, Thompson 3 |

Polideportivo 21 de Abril, Puerto Aysén
Referees: Ashley Gilpin (USA), Mario Granados (ESA), Karol Quiñones (CHI)

16 June 2019
15:30

Boxscore

| Brazil | 62–57 | Puerto Rico |
Scoring by quarter: 24–6, 10–14, 11–20, 17–17
| Pts: Bleidao 20; Rebs: Souza 15; Asts: Bleidao, Souza 3 | | Pts: De León 17; Rebs: Fontaine 8 Asts: De León, Delgado 3 |

Polideportivo 21 de Abril, Puerto Aysén
Referees: Virginia Peruchini (ARG), Nicolás Flores (PAR), Felipe Valenzuela (CHI)

17 June 2019
13:15

Boxscore

| Puerto Rico | 52–39 | Ecuador |
Scoring by quarter: 6–13, 24–5, 12–15, 10–6
| Pts: three players 10; Rebs: Hernández 14; Asts: three players 2 | | Pts: Quiñónez 16; Rebs: Bacilio 10; Asts: Quiñónez 4 |

Polideportivo 21 de Abril, Puerto Aysén
Referees: Virginia Peruchini (ARG), Ashley Gilpin (USA), Karol Quiñones (CHI)

17 June 2019
18:00

Boxscore

| Canada | 78–39 | Brazil |
Scoring by quarter: 25–16, 19–3, 12–15, 22–5
| Pts: Audino 12; Rebs: Alexander 12; Asts: Mercille 5 | | Pts: Oliveira 8 Rebs: Bleidao, Camargo 7 Asts: Oliveira, Souza 2 |

Polideportivo 21 de Abril, Puerto Aysén
Referees: Virginia Peruchini (ARG), Felipe Valenzuela (CHI), Mario Granados (ESA)

18 June 2019
13:15

Boxscore

| Brazil | 55–71 | Ecuador |
Scoring by quarter: 8–24, 12–20, 19–8, 16–19
| Pts: Bleidao 22; Rebs: Bleidao 12; Asts: Rodrigues 4 | | Pts: Pilay 16; Rebs: Pilay 14; Asts: Mora, Prado 3 |

Polideportivo 21 de Abril, Puerto Aysén
Referees: Virginia Peruchini (ARG), Ashley Gilpin (USA), Mario Granados (ESA)

18 June 2019
18:00

Boxscore

| Canada | 83–40 | Puerto Rico |
Scoring by quarter: 21–5, 22–11, 20–11, 20–13
| Pts: Thompson 16; Rebs: Thompson 10; Asts: Allana, Zingaro 4 | | Pts: Ruíz 14; Rebs: Pérez 8 Asts: Pérez 2 |

Polideportivo 21 de Abril, Puerto Aysén
Referees: Gabriel Ramírez (MEX), Felipe Valenzuela (CHI), Karol Quiñones (CHI)

=== Group B ===
| Pos | Team | Pld | W | L | PF | PA | PD | Pts | Qualification |
|---|---|---|---|---|---|---|---|---|---|
| 1 | United States | 3 | 3 | 0 | 321 | 96 | +225 | 6 | Quarterfinals |
| 2 | Chile (H) | 3 | 2 | 1 | 168 | 189 | −21 | 5 | Quarterfinals |
| 3 | Mexico | 3 | 1 | 2 | 140 | 184 | −44 | 4 | Quarterfinals |
| 4 | El Salvador | 3 | 0 | 3 | 90 | 250 | −160 | 3 | Quarterfinals |

Source: FIBA
(H) Hosts

16 June 2019
20:30

Boxscore

| Chile | 63–46 | El Salvador |
Scoring by quarter: 18–14, 16–6, 19–9, 10–17
| Pts: Ovalle 24; Rebs: Ovalle 14; Asts: Alarcón 5 | | Pts: Murcia 21; Rebs: Murcia, Tejada 10; Asts: Murcia 4 |

Polideportivo 21 de Abril, Puerto Aysén
Referees: Andreia Silva (BRA), Carlos Peralta (ECU), Rebeca Dávila (PUR)

17 June 2019
15:30

Boxscore

| El Salvador | 19–114 | United States |
Scoring by quarter: 5–34, 4–23, 9–33, 1–24
| Pts: Am. Williams 6 Rebs: Vega 9 Asts: S. Alfaro 3 | | Pts: Jones 21; Rebs: Barker, Betts 13; Asts: Miles 7 |

Polideportivo 21 de Abril, Puerto Aysén
Referees: Nicolás Flores (PAR), Rebeca Dávila (PUR), Romina Morales (ARG)

17 June 2019
20:15

Boxscore

| Chile | 61–34 | Mexico |
Scoring by quarter: 17–6, 24–7, 11–7, 9–14
| Pts: Ovalle 13; Rebs: Ovalle 15; Asts: Valenzuela 6 | | Pts: Valenzuela 11; Rebs: Valenzuela 12; Asts: Arredondo 3 |

Polideportivo 21 de Abril, Puerto Aysén
Referees: Andreia Silva (BRA), Carlos Peralta (ECU), Romina Morales (ARG)

18 June 2019
15:30

Boxscore

| Mexico | 73–25 | El Salvador |
Scoring by quarter: 12–3, 25–5, 22–4, 14–13
| Pts: Valenzuela 18; Rebs: Valenzuela 21; Asts: Arredondo, V. López 6 | | Pts: Am. Williams 10; Rebs: Maldonado 7 Asts: Am. Williams 4 |

Polideportivo 21 de Abril, Puerto Aysén
Referees: Andreia Silva (BRA), Carlos Peralta (ECU), Rebeca Dávila (PUR)

18 June 2019
20:15

Boxscore

| United States | 109–44 | Chile |
Scoring by quarter: 24–16, 26–5, 36–2, 23–21
| Pts: Verhulst 21; Rebs: Betts 16; Asts: Rice 6 | | Pts: Ovalle 13; Rebs: Torres, Valenzuela 4 Asts: Valenzuela 3 |

Polideportivo 21 de Abril, Puerto Aysén
Referees: Nicolás Flores (PAR), Christine Vuong (CAN), Romina Morales (ARG)

19 June 2019
18:00

Boxscore

| United States | 98–33 | Mexico |
Scoring by quarter: 28–11, 26–6, 17–11, 27–5
| Pts: Verhulst 19; Rebs: Betts 14; Asts: Miles 9 | | Pts: Valenzuela 12; Rebs: Valenzuela 6 Asts: three players 2 |

Polideportivo 21 de Abril, Puerto Aysén
Referees: Christine Vuong (CAN), Rebeca Dávila (PUR), Romina Morales (ARG)

== Knockout stage ==
=== Bracket ===
Fifth place
3A | Ecuador | 59
4A | Brazil | 47
Seventh place
4B | El Salvador | 38
3B | Mexico | 61

5–8th place semifinals
4B | El Salvador | 26
3A | Ecuador | 59
3B | Mexico | 39
4A | Brazil | 49

Quarterfinals
1A | Canada | 61
4B | El Salvador | 15
2B | Chile | 56
3A | Ecuador | 43
2A | Puerto Rico | 50
3B | Mexico | 48
1B | United States | 107
4A | Brazil | 32

Semifinals
1A | Canada | 50
2B | Chile | 38
2A | Puerto Rico | 30
1B | United States | 103

Final
1A | Canada | 37
1B | United States | 87
Third place
2B | Chile | 59
2A | Puerto Rico | 49

=== Quarterfinals ===
20 June 2019
13:15

Boxscore

| Canada | 61–15 | El Salvador |
Scoring by quarter: 20–0, 18–6, 14–3, 9–6
| Pts: Thompson 13; Rebs: Stupar 11; Asts: Alexander 4 | | Pts: Roque 6 Rebs: Roque 6 Asts: three players 1 |

Polideportivo 21 de Abril, Puerto Aysén
Referees: Ashley Gilpin (USA), Romina Morales (ARG), Rebeca Davila (PUR)

20 June 2019
15:30

Boxscore

| United States | 107–32 | Brazil |
Scoring by quarter: 27–10, 25–5, 28–11, 27–6
| Pts: Citron 16; Rebs: Betts 14; Asts: three players 5 | | Pts: Dias 8 Rebs: Camargo, Carvalho 6 Asts: Oliveira 2 |

Polideportivo 21 de Abril, Puerto Aysén
Referees: Nicolás Flores (PAR), Karol Quiñones (CHI), Mario Granados (ESA)

20 June 2019
18:00

Boxscore

| Puerto Rico | 50–48 | Mexico |
Scoring by quarter: 15–12, 14–13, 7–14, 14–9
| Pts: García 13; Rebs: García 6 Asts: Vázquez 5 | | Pts: Valenzuela 17; Rebs: Valenzuela 14; Asts: three players 2 |

Polideportivo 21 de Abril, Puerto Aysén
Referees: Carlos Peralta (ECU), Christine Vuong (CAN), Felipe Valenzuela (CHI)

20 June 2019
20:15

Boxscore

| Chile | 56–43 | Ecuador |
Scoring by quarter: 9–8, 11–18, 13–11, 23–6
| Pts: Ovalle 23; Rebs: Ovalle 17; Asts: Valenzuela 5 | | Pts: Quiñónez 18; Rebs: Bacilio 12; Asts: Mora 3 |

Polideportivo 21 de Abril, Puerto Aysén
Referees: Andreia Silva (BRA), Virginia Peruchini (ARG), Gabriel Ramirez (MEX)

=== 5–8th place semifinals ===
21 June 2019
13:15

Boxscore

| Mexico | 39–49 | Brazil |
Scoring by quarter: 14–13, 6–6, 7–24, 12–6
| Pts: three players 9 Rebs: Valenzuela 22; Asts: Lopez 3 | | Pts: Bleidao 18; Rebs: Carvalho, Camargo 12; Asts: Reolon 4 |

Polideportivo 21 de Abril, Puerto Aysén
Referees: Virginia Peruchini (ARG), Christine Vuong (CAN), Felipe Valenzuela (CHI)

21 June 2019
15:30

Boxscore

| El Salvador | 26–59 | Ecuador |
Scoring by quarter: 4–20, 3–17, 7–13, 12–9
| Pts: Am. Williams 8 Rebs: Vega 13; Asts: Alfaro 3 | | Pts: Bacilio 16; Rebs: Bacilio 15; Asts: Argüello 5 |

Polideportivo 21 de Abril, Puerto Aysén
Referees: Andreia Silva (BRA), Ashley Gilpin (USA), Rebeca Davila (PUR)

=== Semifinals ===
21 June 2019
18:00

Boxscore

| Puerto Rico | 30–103 | United States |
Scoring by quarter: 9–18, 11–23, 6–37, 4–25
| Pts: De León 7 Rebs: Pérez 5 Asts: Pérez, Vázquez 2 | | Pts: Betts 16; Rebs: Barker 13; Asts: Miles 11 |

Polideportivo 21 de Abril, Puerto Aysén
Referees: Carlos Peralta (ECU), Karol Quiñones (CHI), Romina Morales (ARG)

21 June 2019
20:15

Boxscore

| Canada | 50–38 | Chile |
Scoring by quarter: 15–15, 12–4, 11–17, 12–2
| Pts: Alexander 16; Rebs: Alexander 13; Asts: Alexander 4 | | Pts: Ovalle 15; Rebs: Ovalle 13; Asts: Ovalle 3 |

Polideportivo 21 de Abril, Puerto Aysén
Referees: Gabriel Ramirez (MEX), Nicolas Flores (PAR), Mario Granados (ESA)

=== Seventh place game ===
22 June 2019
13:15

Boxscore

| El Salvador | 38–61 | Mexico |
Scoring by quarter: 13–16, 7–17, 13–14, 5–14
| Pts: Vega, Am. Williams 11; Rebs: Tejada 12; Asts: Alfaro 4 | | Pts: Quiroz 15; Rebs: Valenzuela 17; Asts: Gil 5 |

Polideportivo 21 de Abril, Puerto Aysén
Referees: Felipe Valenzuela (CHI), Rebeca Davila (PUR), Romina Morales (ARG)

=== Fifth place game ===
22 June 2019
15:30

Boxscore

| Ecuador | 59–47 | Brazil |
Scoring by quarter: 21–13, 18–12, 7–8, 13–14
| Pts: Quiñónez 20; Rebs: Vaicekauskas 10; Asts: Argüello 4 | | Pts: Carvalho 10; Rebs: Carvalho 10; Asts: Rodrigues 3 |

Polideportivo 21 de Abril, Puerto Aysén
Referees: Nicolas Flores (PAR), Karol Quiñones (CHI), Mario Granados (ESA)

=== Third place game ===
22 June 2019
18:00

Boxscore

| Chile | 59–49 | Puerto Rico |
Scoring by quarter: 9–17, 16–11, 18–2, 16–19
| Pts: Ovalle 19; Rebs: Ovalle 16; Asts: Alarcón 3 | | Pts: De León 27; Rebs: De León, Hernández 9 Asts: Ruíz 2 |

Polideportivo 21 de Abril, Puerto Aysén
Referees: Ashley Gilpin (USA), Christine Vuong (CAN), Gabriel Ramirez (MEX)

=== Final ===
22 June 2019
20:15

Boxscore

| Canada | 37–87 | United States |
Scoring by quarter: 2–24, 12–21, 9–25, 14–17
| Pts: Thompson 10; Rebs: Zingaro 6 Asts: Allana 4 | | Pts: Verhulst 18; Rebs: Betts 14; Asts: Miles 8 |

Polideportivo 21 de Abril, Puerto Aysén
Referees: Andreia Silva (BRA), Carlos Peralta (ECU), Virginia Peruchini (ARG)

== Final ranking ==
| Qualified for the 2020 FIBA Under-17 Women's Basketball World Cup |

| Rank | Team | Record |
|---|---|---|
| 1st place, gold medalist(s) | United States | 6–0 |
| 2nd place, silver medalist(s) | Canada | 5–1 |
| 3rd place, bronze medalist(s) | Chile | 4–2 |
| 4 | Puerto Rico | 3–3 |
| 5 | Ecuador | 3–3 |
| 6 | Brazil | 2–4 |
| 7 | Mexico | 2–4 |
| 8 | El Salvador | 0–6 |

== Awards ==
2019 FIBA Under-16 Women's Americas champions

United States
5th title

All-Tournament Team

- (United States) Payton Verhulst (MVP)
- (United States) Lauren Betts
- (United States) Sonia Citron
- (Canada) Isaline Alexander
- (Chile) Fernanda Ovalle
