= Brazil women's national under-17 basketball team =

Brazil
- FIBA zone: FIBA Americas
- National federation: Confederação Brasileira de Basketball

U17 World Cup
- Appearances: 3
- Medals: None

U16 AmeriCup
- Appearances: 7
- Medals: (silver) Silver: 2 (2011, 2015); (bronze) Bronze: 1 (2013)

U15 South American Championship
- Appearances: 23
- Medals: (gold) Gold: 15 (1990, 1992, 1994, 1996, 1997, 1998, 2000, 2001, 2005, 2006, 2009, 2010, 2011, 2012, 2014); (silver) Silver: 5 (1987, 1999, 2004, 2007, 2008); (bronze) Bronze: 2 (2018, 2022)
Home	Away

The Brazil women's national under-15, under-16 and under-17 basketball team is a national basketball team of Brazil, administered by the Brazilian Basketball Confederation (Portuguese: Confederação Brasileira de Basketball), abbreviated as CBB. It represents the country in international under-15, under-16 and under-17 women's basketball competitions.

== Under-15 South American Championship participations ==
Year	Result
1987	2nd place, silver medalist(s)
1990	1st place, gold medalist(s)
1992	1st place, gold medalist(s)
1994	1st place, gold medalist(s)
1996	1st place, gold medalist(s)
1997	1st place, gold medalist(s)
1998	1st place, gold medalist(s)
1999	2nd place, silver medalist(s)

Year	Result
2000	1st place, gold medalist(s)
2001	1st place, gold medalist(s)
2004	2nd place, silver medalist(s)
2005	1st place, gold medalist(s)
2006	1st place, gold medalist(s)
2007	2nd place, silver medalist(s)
2008	2nd place, silver medalist(s)
2009	1st place, gold medalist(s)

Year	Result
2010	1st place, gold medalist(s)
2011	1st place, gold medalist(s)
2012	1st place, gold medalist(s)
2014	1st place, gold medalist(s)
2018	3rd place, bronze medalist(s)
2022	3rd place, bronze medalist(s)
2024	4th

== Under-16 AmeriCup participations ==
Year	Result
2009	4th
2011	2nd place, silver medalist(s)
2013	3rd place, bronze medalist(s)
2015	2nd place, silver medalist(s)
2019	6th
2021	6th
2023	6th

== Under-17 World Cup record ==
Year	Pos.	Pld	W	L
(France) 2010	Did not qualify			
(Netherlands) 2012	11th	7	2	5
(Czech Republic) 2014	9th	7	5	2
(Spain) 2016	13th	6	2	4
(Belarus) 2018	Did not participate			
(Hungary) 2022	Did not qualify			
(Mexico) 2024	Did not qualify			
(Czech Republic) 2026	To be determined			
Total	3/8	20	9	11

== History ==
=== Under-15 South American Championship ===
Brazil is the most successful team in the number of medals won at the South American Championship (15 gold, five silver and two bronze medals).

=== Under-16 AmeriCup ===
At the Americas Championship, Brazil has traditionally battled Argentina as South America's frontrunner. In this duel, Brazil has kept the upper hand as they have won two silver medals. At the 2015 event, Brazil eliminated the traditionally dominant United States but ceded to Canada in the finals 71-72 after overtime.

In 2021, Ana Passos Alves Da Silva and Taissa Nascimento Queiroz both averaged a double-double through group play for Brazil, but Giovanna Rocha da Silva has followed the lead with a 10 point and 8 rebound average of her own.

=== Under-17 World Cup ===
As the only South American team, Brazil qualified for the 2016 FIBA Under-17 World Championship for Women where they finished 13th.

== See also ==
- Brazil women's national basketball team
- Brazil women's national under-19 basketball team
- Brazil men's national under-17 basketball team
