= Payton Verhulst =

American basketball player

No. 12 – Oklahoma Sooners
- Position: Guard

Personal information
- Born: June 1, 2003 (age 23)
- Listed height: 6 ft 1 in (1.85 m)

Career information
- High school: Bishop Miege (Roeland Park, Kansas)
- College: Louisville (2021–2023); Oklahoma (2023–2025)

Career highlights
- First-team All-Big 12 (2024); ACC All-Freshman Team (2022); McDonald's All-American (2021); FIBA Americas Championship MVP (2019)
Medals
Women's basketball
Representing the United States
FIBA Under-19 World Cup
Gold medal – first place	2021 Hungary	Team
FIBA Under-16 Americas Championship
Gold medal – first place	2019 Chile	Team

Payton Verhulst is an American college basketball player for the Oklahoma Sooners of the SEC. She previously played for the Louisville Cardinals.

== High school career ==
Verhulst played basketball for Bishop Miege High School in Roeland Park, Kansas. As a senior, she led Bishop Miege to a 23-1 record and a Kansas Class 4A state championship, while averaging 20.0 points, 7.5 rebounds, 3.8 steals, 3.6 assists, and 3.5 blocks a game. She was McDonald's All-American and played in the Jordan Brand Classic. She was Kansas' Girls Basketball Player of the Year, the 2021 USA Today National Female Athlete of the Year, and the 2021 Kansas Player of the year by MaxPreps. She was a two-time Kansas Gatorade Player of the Year Rated a five-star recruit by ESPN and ranked No. 12 in the class of 2021, Verhulst committed to play for Louisville.

== College career ==
Verhulst was named to the ACC All-Freshman Team. She set career-highs with 13 points and three threes, shooting 2-2 from the line in the win over Duke. In her sophomore year, Verhulst played in eight games for Louisville before transferring to Oklahoma. She averaged 6.4 points, 1.5 rebounds and 1.1 steals per game.

In her junior year, she played and started in 32 games, averaging 12.6 points, 5.8 rebounds, 3.9 assists, 1.2 steals and 1.0 blocks per game. She had a career-high 32 points on 12-15 shooting with six rebounds, six assists, three blocks and two steals against Oral Roberts on November 12. She was named Big 12 Newcomer of the Year and a first-team All-Big 12 selection.

== National team career ==
Verhulst was the 2019 FIBA Americas U16 Championship MVP after leading the team to a 6-0 record and a gold medal.

== Career statistics ==
Legend
GP	Games played	GS	Games started	MPG	Minutes per game	FG%	Field goal percentage
3P%	3-point field goal percentage	FT%	Free throw percentage	RPG	Rebounds per game	APG	Assists per game
SPG	Steals per game	BPG	Blocks per game	TO	Turnovers per game	PPG	Points per game

=== College ===
Payton Verhulst NCAA Statistics
Year	Team	GP	GS	MPG	FG%	3P%	FT%	RPG	APG	SPG	BPG	TO	PPG
2021–22	Louisville	32	0	11.1	42.9	40.0	75.0	1.9	0.8	0.7	0.3	0.6	3.3
2022–23	Louisville	8	0	15.0	38.2	20.8	66.7	1.5	0.9	1.1	0.3	0.8	6.4
2023–24	Oklahoma	32	32	29.1	39.6	35.0	79.1	5.8	3.9	1.2	1.0	2.4	12.6
2024–25	Oklahoma	35	35	29.3	42.1	35.2	83.1	5.7	3.9	1.4	0.8	2.0	14.9
Career		107	67	22.7	40.9	34.7	80.3	4.3	2.7	1.1	0.7	1.6	10.1
