= Bolivia women's national under-15 basketball team =

Bolivia
- FIBA zone: FIBA Americas
- National federation: Federación Boliviana de Básquetbol

U17 World Cup
- Appearances: None

U16 AmeriCup
- Appearances: None

U15 South American Championship
- Appearances: 7–14 (Note: Data from 1987, 1990, 1992, 1998, 1999, 2000 and 2001 championships are not available)
- Medals: None

The Bolivia women's national under-15 basketball team is a national basketball team of Bolivia, administered by the Federación Boliviana de Básquetbol (FBB). It represents the country in international under-15 women's basketball competitions.

== FIBA South America Under-15 Championship for Women participations ==
Year	Result
1994	5th
1996	4th
1997	4th
2005	8th
2008	6th
2022	4th
2024	8th

== See also ==
- Bolivia women's national basketball team
- Bolivia women's national under-17 and under-18 basketball team
- Bolivia men's national under-15 basketball team
