= FIBA U15 Women's South American Championship =

International youth basketball tournament

- Current season, competition or edition: 2024 FIBA U15 Women's South American Championship
- Formerly: FIBA South American Championship for Cadettes; FIBA South America Under-15 Championship for Women
- Sport: Basketball
- Founded: 1987; 39 years ago
- Organizing body: FIBA Americas
- No. of teams: 10 max.
- Continent: South America
- Most recent champion: Venezuela (1st title)
- Most titles: Brazil (15 titles)
- Qualification: FIBA Under-16 Women's AmeriCup
- Related competitions: FIBA U17 Women's South American Championship
- Website: www.fiba.basketball/history

The FIBA U15 Women's South American Championship is a basketball tournament held about every two years among the ten countries of South America and is organized in part by FIBA Americas. The tournament serves as a gateway to the FIBA Under-16 Women's AmeriCup. Originally, this competition was played in the under-16 age category, and since 2008 it has been played in the under-15 age category.

== Summary ==
Year	Host	Gold	Silver	Bronze
1987	Ecuador (Ibarra)	Argentina	Brazil	Venezuela
1990	Colombia (Pasto)	Brazil	Colombia	Venezuela
1992	Paraguay (Asunción)	Brazil	Argentina	Peru
1994	Chile (Santiago)	Brazil	Argentina	Peru
1996	Bolivia (Santa Cruz)	Brazil	Argentina	Peru
1997	Argentina (Buenos Aires)	Brazil	Argentina	Peru
1998	Brazil (São Paulo)	Brazil	Argentina	Venezuela
1999	Peru (Lima)	Argentina	Brazil	Ecuador
2000	Colombia (Cúcuta)	Brazil	Argentina	Chile
2001	Ecuador (Quito)	Brazil	Argentina	Colombia
2004	Venezuela (Barquisimeto)	Argentina	Brazil	Venezuela
2005	Venezuela (Barquisimeto)	Brazil	Paraguay	Venezuela
2006	Ecuador (Cuenca)	Brazil	Venezuela	Ecuador
2007	Ecuador (Loja)	Argentina	Brazil	Colombia
2008	Paraguay (Asunción)	Argentina	Brazil	Paraguay
2009	Ecuador (Portoviejo)	Brazil	Argentina	Venezuela
2010	Uruguay (Trinidad)	Brazil	Argentina	Venezuela
2011	Ecuador (Chordeleg)	Brazil	Chile	Argentina
2012	Venezuela (Caracas)	Brazil	Venezuela	Argentina
2014	Venezuela (Barquisimeto)	Brazil	Venezuela	Argentina
2016	Ecuador (Ibarra)	Argentina	Venezuela	Colombia
2018	Chile (Puerto Aysén)	Chile	Ecuador	Brazil
2022	Chile (Santiago)	Argentina	Colombia	Brazil
2024	Venezuela (Barquisimeto)	Venezuela	Colombia	Argentina

== Medal table ==
Rank	Nation	Gold	Silver	Bronze	Total
1	Brazil	15	5	2	22
2	Argentina	7	9	4	20
3	Venezuela	1	4	7	12
4	Chile	1	1	1	3
5	Colombia	0	3	3	6
6	Ecuador	0	1	2	3
7	Paraguay	0	1	1	2
8	Peru	0	0	4	4
Totals (8 entries)		24	24	24	72

== Participation details ==
Team	(Ecuador); 1987	(Colombia); 1990	(Paraguay); 1992	(Chile); 1994	(Bolivia); 1996	(Argentina); 1997	(Brazil); 1998	(Peru); 1999	(Colombia); 2000	(Ecuador); 2001	(Venezuela); 2004	(Venezuela); 2005	(Ecuador); 2006	(Ecuador); 2007	(Paraguay); 2008	(Ecuador); 2009	(Uruguay); 2010	(Ecuador); 2011	(Venezuela); 2012	(Venezuela); 2014	(Ecuador); 2016	(Chile); 2018	(Chile); 2022	(Venezuela); 2024
Argentina	1st	?	2nd	2nd	2nd	2nd	2nd	1st	2nd	2nd	1st	4th	—	1st	1st	2nd	2nd	3rd	3rd	3rd	1st	4th	1st	3rd
Bolivia	?	?	?	5th	4th	4th	?	?	?	?	—	8th	—	—	6th	—	—	—	—	—	—	—	4th	8th
Brazil	2nd	1st	1st	1st	1st	1st	1st	2nd	1st	1st	2nd	1st	1st	2nd	2nd	1st	1st	1st	1st	1st	—	3rd	3rd	4th
Chile	?	?	?	4th	—	8th	?	?	3rd	?	—	—	6th	6th	5th	5th	4th	2nd	—	6th	6th	1st	5th	5th
Colombia	?	2nd	?	—	—	5th	?	?	?	3rd	4th	5th	—	3rd	—	6th	—	4th	—	4th	3rd	5th	2nd	2nd
Ecuador	?	?	?	—	5th	7th	?	3rd	?	?	—	7th	3rd	4th	4th	4th	—	5th	—	5th	4th	2nd	6th	6th
Paraguay	?	?	?	—	6th	9th	?	?	?	?	5th	2nd	7th	—	3rd	7th	5th	—	6th	7th	—	7th	7th	—
Peru	?	?	3rd	3rd	3rd	3rd	?	?	?	?	6th	6th	4th	7th	—	—	6th	7th	4th	8th	7th	—	—	—
Uruguay	?	?	?	—	—	10th	?	?	?	?	—	—	5th	—	—	—	7th	6th	5th	—	5th	6th	8th	7th
Venezuela	3rd	3rd	?	—	—	6th	3rd	?	?	?	3rd	3rd	2nd	5th	—	3rd	3rd	—	2nd	2nd	2nd	8th	—	1st

== See also ==
- FIBA U17 Women's South American Championship
- FIBA U15 South American Championship
- FIBA U17 South American Championship
- FIBA South America Under-21 Championship for Men (defunct)
