= 2024 FIBA U15 Women's South American Championship =

International youth basketball tournament

Tournament details
- Host country: Venezuela
- City: Barquisimeto
- Dates: 6–10 November 2024
- Teams: 8 (from 1 confederation)
- Venue: 1 (in 1 host city)

Final positions
- Champions: Venezuela (1st title)
- Runners-up: Colombia
- Third place: Argentina
- Fourth place: Brazil

Official website
- www.fiba.basketball

The 2024 FIBA U15 Women's South American Championship was the 24th edition of the South American basketball championship for under-15 women's national teams. The tournament was played at Domo Bolivariano in Barquisimeto, Venezuela, from 6 to 10 November 2024.

== Participating teams ==
- Argentina
- Bolivia
- Brazil
- Chile
- Colombia
- Ecuador
- Uruguay
- Venezuela

== First round ==
In the first round, the teams were drawn into two groups of four. The first two teams from each group advanced to the semifinals; the third and fourth teams advanced to the 5th–8th place playoffs.

All times are local (Venezuelan Standard Time – UTC-4).

=== Group A ===
Pos	Team	Pld	W	L	PF	PA	PD	Pts	Qualification
1	Colombia	3	3	0	178	131	+47	6	Semifinals
2	Venezuela	3	2	1	203	141	+62	5	Semifinals
3	Chile	3	1	2	134	159	−25	4	5th–8th place playoffs
4	Bolivia	3	0	3	120	204	−84	3	5th–8th place playoffs

Source: FIBA

6 November 2024
17:00

Boxscore

Venezuela	77–43	Bolivia
Scoring by quarter: 13–13, 26–9, 28–13, 10–8

Domo Bolivariano, Barquisimeto

6 November 2024
19:30

Boxscore

Colombia	49–38	Chile
Scoring by quarter: 9–5, 18–11, 10–6, 12–16

Domo Bolivariano, Barquisimeto

7 November 2024
17:00

Boxscore

Chile	34–69	Venezuela
Scoring by quarter: 19–19, 7–23, 4–16, 4–11

Domo Bolivariano, Barquisimeto

7 November 2024
19:30

Boxscore

Bolivia	36–65	Colombia
Scoring by quarter: 3–10, 9–27, 12–18, 12–10

Domo Bolivariano, Barquisimeto

8 November 2024
17:00

Boxscore

Venezuela	57–64	Colombia
Scoring by quarter: 14–21, 17–14, 8–9, 18–20

Domo Bolivariano, Barquisimeto

8 November 2024
19:30

Boxscore

Chile	62–41	Bolivia
Scoring by quarter: 14–19, 8–6, 22–3, 18–13

Domo Bolivariano, Barquisimeto

=== Group B ===
Pos	Team	Pld	W	L	PF	PA	PD	Pts	Qualification
1	Argentina	3	3	0	196	123	+73	6	Semifinals
2	Brazil	3	2	1	146	171	−25	5	Semifinals
3	Ecuador	3	1	2	180	180	0	4	5th–8th place playoffs
4	Uruguay	3	0	3	143	191	−48	3	5th–8th place playoffs

Source: FIBA

6 November 2024
12:00

Boxscore

Brazil	64–56	Ecuador
Scoring by quarter: 20–12, 11–13, 14–13, 19–18

Domo Bolivariano, Barquisimeto

6 November 2024
14:30

Boxscore

Uruguay	40–68	Argentina
Scoring by quarter: 8–17, 8–20, 8–12, 16–19

Domo Bolivariano, Barquisimeto

7 November 2024
12:00

Boxscore

Argentina	67–24	Brazil
Scoring by quarter: 19–7, 15–2, 18–11, 15–4

Domo Bolivariano, Barquisimeto

7 November 2024
14:30

Boxscore

Ecuador	65–55	Uruguay
Scoring by quarter: 8–13, 17–13, 20–12, 20–17

Domo Bolivariano, Barquisimeto

8 November 2024
12:00

Boxscore

Argentina	61–59	Ecuador
Scoring by quarter: 13–21, 17–14, 12–13, 19–11

Domo Bolivariano, Barquisimeto

8 November 2024
14:30

Boxscore

Brazil	58–48	Uruguay
Scoring by quarter: 17–10, 18–7, 10–18, 13–13

Domo Bolivariano, Barquisimeto

== 5th–8th place playoffs ==
5th–8th place semifinals
A3	Chile	66
B4	Uruguay	51
B3	Ecuador	100
A4	Bolivia	57

5th place match
A3	Chile	74
B3	Ecuador	70
7th place match
B4	Uruguay	55
A4	Bolivia	47

=== 5th–8th place semifinals ===
9 November 2024
12:00

Boxscore

Chile	66–51	Uruguay
Scoring by quarter: 8–16, 21–18, 14–10, 23–7

Domo Bolivariano, Barquisimeto

9 November 2024
14:30

Boxscore

Ecuador	100–57	Bolivia
Scoring by quarter: 32–16, 31–11, 20–16, 17–14

Domo Bolivariano, Barquisimeto

=== 7th place match ===
10 November 2024
12:00

Boxscore

Uruguay	55–47	Bolivia
Scoring by quarter: 11–17, 9–9, 17–13, 18–8

Domo Bolivariano, Barquisimeto

=== 5th place match ===
10 November 2024
14:30

Boxscore

Chile	74–70	Ecuador
Scoring by quarter: 12–17, 22–15, 20–19, 20–19

Domo Bolivariano, Barquisimeto

== Championship playoffs ==
Semifinals
A1	Colombia	57
B2	Brazil	52
B1	Argentina	70
A2	Venezuela	74

Final
A1	Colombia	59
A2	Venezuela	72
3rd place match
B2	Brazil	53
B1	Argentina	68

=== Semifinals ===
9 November 2024
17:00

Boxscore

Argentina	70–74	Venezuela
Scoring by quarter: 14–20, 15–15, 24–18, 17–21

Domo Bolivariano, Barquisimeto

9 November 2024
19:30

Boxscore

Colombia	57–52	Brazil
Scoring by quarter: 12–16, 17–13, 15–10, 13–13

Domo Bolivariano, Barquisimeto

=== 3rd place match ===
10 November 2024
17:00

Boxscore

Brazil	53–68	Argentina
Scoring by quarter: 9–18, 9–18, 17–12, 18–20

Domo Bolivariano, Barquisimeto

=== Final ===
10 November 2024
19:30

Boxscore

Colombia	59–72	Venezuela
Scoring by quarter: 22–25, 21–17, 9–17, 7–13

Domo Bolivariano, Barquisimeto

== Final standings ==
Rank	Team
1st place, gold medalist(s)	Venezuela
2nd place, silver medalist(s)	Colombia
3rd place, bronze medalist(s)	Argentina
4	Brazil
5	Chile
6	Ecuador
7	Uruguay
8	Bolivia

Qualified for the 2025 FIBA U16 Women's AmeriCup
