= Big East Conference Women's Basketball Freshman of the Year =

Basketball award

- Awarded for: the top women's basketball freshman in the Big East Conference
- Country: United States

History
- First award: 1983
- Most recent: Blanca Quiñónez, UConn

The Big East Conference Women's Basketball Freshman of the Year, known as the Big East Conference Women's Basketball Rookie of the Year from 1989 to 2003, is an annual college basketball award presented to the top women's basketball freshman in the Big East Conference.

== Key ==
| † | Co-Freshman of the Year |
| * | Awarded a national Freshman of the Year award: USBWA National Freshman of the Year (USBWA); WBCA Freshman of the Year (WBCA) |

== Winners ==
| Season | Player | School | National Freshman of the Year Awards | Source(s) |
|---|---|---|---|---|
| 1982–83 | Ann Marie McNamee | St. John's | — | |
| 1983–84 | Shelly Pennefather | Villanova | — | |
| 1984–85 | Felisha Legette-Jack | Syracuse | — | |
| 1985–86 | Geraldine Saintilus | Seton Hall | — | |
| 1986–87 | Kris Lamb | UConn | — | |
| 1987–88 | Laura Lishness | UConn | — | |
| 1988–89 | Tracy Lis | Providence | — | |
| 1989–90 | Sarah Behn | Boston College | — | |
| 1990–91 | Jonna Huemrich | Pittsburgh | — | |
| 1991–92 | Rebecca Lobo | UConn | — | |
| 1992–93^{†} | Holly Rilinger | Miami | — | |
| 1992–93^{†} | Jennifer Rizzotti | UConn | — | |
| 1993–94 | Holly Porter | Boston College | — | |
| 1994–95 | Nykesha Sales | UConn | — | |
| 1995–96 | Kimberly Smith | Georgetown | — | |
| 1996–97 | Shea Ralph* | UConn | USBWA | |
| 1997–98 | Natasha Pointer | Rutgers | — | |
| 1998–99 | Tamika Williams | UConn | — | |
| 1999–2000 | Alicia Ratay | Notre Dame | — | |
| 2000–01 | Rebekkah Brunson | Georgetown | — | |
| 2001–02 | Jacqueline Batteast* | Notre Dame | USBWA | |
| 2002–03 | Cappie Pondexter | Rutgers | — | |
| 2003–04 | Meg Bulger | West Virginia | — | |
| 2004–05 | Matee Ajavon | Rutgers | — | |
| 2005–06 | Renee Montgomery | UConn | — | |
| 2006–07 | Tina Charles* | UConn | USBWA | |
| 2007–08 | Maya Moore* | UConn | UWBWA | |
| 2008–09 | Da'Shena Stevens | St. John's | — | |
| 2009–10 | Sugar Rodgers | Georgetown | — | |
| 2010–11 | Bria Hartley | UConn | — | |
| 2011–12 | Kaleena Mosqueda-Lewis | UConn | — | |
| 2012–13 | Jewell Loyd* | Notre Dame | USBWA | |
| 2013–14 | Natalie Butler | Georgetown | — | |
| 2014–15 | Dorothy Adomako | Georgetown | — | |
| 2015–16 | Allazia Blockton | Marquette | — | |
| 2016–17 | Jaylyn Agnew | Creighton | — | |
| 2017–18 | Qadashah Hoppie | St. John's | — | |
| 2018–19 | Mary Baskerville | Providence | — | |
| 2019–20 | Maddy Siegrist | Villanova | — | |
| 2020–21 | Paige Bueckers* (Note: Bueckers also won the Naismith and Wooden Awards as the national player of the year.) | UConn | USBWA; WBCA | |
| 2021–22 | Aneesah Morrow | DePaul | USBWA; WBCA | |
| 2022–23 | Kennedy Fauntleroy | Georgetown | — | |
| 2023–24 | Ashlynn Shade | UConn | — | |
| 2024–25 | Sarah Strong | UConn | WBCA | |
| 2025–26 | Blanca Quiñónez | UConn | TBA | |

== Winners by school ==
| School (year joined) | Winners | Years |
|---|---|---|
| UConn (1979–2013, 2020–present) (Note: Following the split of the original Big East, Cincinnati, Louisville, Rutgers, South Florida, and UConn all remained in the football-sponsoring portion that became the American Athletic Conference.) (Note: UConn joined the current Big East in 2020.) | 16 | 1987, 1988, 1992, 1993, 1995, 1997, 1999, 2006, 2007, 2008, 2011, 2012, 2021, 2024, 2025, 2026 |
| Georgetown (1979–present) | 6 | 1996, 2001, 2010, 2014, 2015, 2023 |
| Notre Dame (1995–2013) (Note: Notre Dame, Pitt, and Syracuse all left for the Atlantic Coast Conference after the 2012–13 season.) | 3 | 2000, 2002, 2013 |
| Rutgers (1995–2013) | 3 | 1998, 2003, 2005 |
| St. John's (1979–present) | 3 | 1983, 2009, 2018 |
| Boston College (1979–2005) (Note: Boston College left for the ACC in 2005.) | 2 | 1990, 1994 |
| Providence (1979–present) | 2 | 1989, 2019 |
| Villanova (1980–present) | 2 | 1984, 2020 |
| Creighton (2013–present) | 1 | 2017 |
| DePaul (2005–present) | 1 | 2022 |
| Marquette (2005–present) | 1 | 2016 |
| Miami (1991–2004) (Note: Miami and Virginia Tech left for the ACC in 2004.) | 1 | 1993 |
| Pittsburgh (1982–2013) | 1 | 1991 |
| Seton Hall (1979–present) | 1 | 1986 |
| Syracuse (1979–2013) | 1 | 1985 |
| West Virginia (1995–2012) (Note: West Virginia left for the Big 12 Conference in 2012.) | 1 | 2004 |
| Butler (2013–present) | 0 | — |
| Cincinnati (2005–2013) | 0 | — |
| Louisville (2005–2013) | 0 | — |
| USF (2005–2013) | 0 | — |
| Virginia Tech (2000–2004) | 0 | — |
| Xavier (2013–present) | 0 | — |
