= Uruguay women's national under-15 basketball team =

Uruguay
- FIBA zone: FIBA Americas
- National federation: Federación Uruguaya de Básquetbol

U17 World Cup
- Appearances: None

U16 AmeriCup
- Appearances: None

U15 South American Championship
- Appearances: 9–16 (Note: Data from 1987, 1990, 1992, 1998, 1999, 2000 and 2001 championships are not available)
- Medals: None

The Uruguay women's national under-15 basketball team is a national basketball team of Uruguay, administered by the Federación Uruguaya de Básquetbol - "FUBB". It represents the country in international under-15 women's basketball competitions.

== FIBA South America Under-15 Championship for Women participations ==
Year	Result
1997	10th
2006	5th
2010	7th
2011	6th
2012	5th
2016	5th
2018	6th
2022	8th
2024	7th

== See also ==
- Uruguay women's national basketball team
- Uruguay women's national under-17 basketball team
- Uruguay men's national under-15 basketball team
