= 2025 FIBA U16 Women's AmeriCup =

9th FIBA Under-16 Women's Americas Basketball Championship

Tournament details
- Host country: Mexico
- City: Irapuato
- Dates: 16–22 June 2025
- Teams: 8 (from 1 confederation)
- Venue: 1 (in 1 host city)

Final positions
- Champions: United States (8th title)
- Runners-up: Canada
- Third place: Mexico

Tournament statistics
- MVP: (United States) Ivanna Wilson Manyacka

Official website
- www.fiba.basketball

The 2025 FIBA U16 Women's AmeriCup was the ninth edition of the Americas basketball championship for women's under-16 national teams. The tournament was played in Irapuato, Mexico, from 16 to 22 June 2025. The top four teams qualified for the 2026 FIBA Under-17 Women's Basketball World Cup in Czechia.

The United States won their eighth title, after defeating Canada 85–59 in the final.

== Participating teams ==
- North America:
1. United States
2. Canada
- Central America and the Caribbean: (2024 FIBA U15 Women's Centrobasket in David, Panama, 24–28 July 2024)
1. Mexico
2. Panama
3. Puerto Rico
- South America: (2024 FIBA U15 Women's South American Championship in Barquisimeto, Venezuela, 6–10 November 2024)
1. Venezuela
2. Colombia
3. Argentina

== Group phase ==
In this round, the teams were drawn into two groups of four. All teams advanced to the playoffs.

All times are local (Time in Mexico / Pacific Zone DST – UTC-6).

=== Group A ===
Pos	Team	Pld	W	L	PF	PA	PD	Pts
1	United States	3	3	0	352	136	+216	6
2	Argentina	3	2	1	183	203	−20	5
3	Venezuela	3	1	2	168	222	−54	4
4	Puerto Rico	3	0	3	133	275	−142	3

Source: FIBA

16 June 2025
12:30

Boxscore

Puerto Rico	50–73	Argentina
Scoring by quarter: 17–22, 5–18, 13–14, 15–19

Inforum, Irapuato

16 June 2025
15:00

Boxscore

Venezuela	52–113	United States
Scoring by quarter: 12–29, 17–21, 14–33, 9–30

Inforum, Irapuato

17 June 2025
12:30

Boxscore

Argentina	64–52	Venezuela
Scoring by quarter: 24–8, 16–17, 14–12, 10–15

Inforum, Irapuato

17 June 2025
15:00

Boxscore

United States	138–38	Puerto Rico
Scoring by quarter: 46–9, 31–11, 41–12, 20–6

Inforum, Irapuato

18 June 2025
12:30

Boxscore

Puerto Rico	45–64	Venezuela
Scoring by quarter: 10–24, 11–19, 9–7, 15–14

Inforum, Irapuato

18 June 2025
15:00

Boxscore

United States	101–46	Argentina
Scoring by quarter: 27–6, 21–11, 32–16, 21–13

Inforum, Irapuato

=== Group B ===
Pos	Team	Pld	W	L	PF	PA	PD	Pts
1	Canada	3	3	0	246	95	+151	6
2	Mexico (H)	3	2	1	218	142	+76	5
3	Colombia	3	1	2	129	137	−8	4
4	Panama	3	0	3	71	290	−219	3

Source: FIBA
(H) Hosts

16 June 2025
17:30

Boxscore

Colombia	29–63	Canada
Scoring by quarter: 3–12, 7–15, 12–16, 7–20

Inforum, Irapuato

16 June 2025
20:00

Boxscore

Mexico	122–27	Panama
Scoring by quarter: 27–18, 33–2, 39–1, 23–6

Inforum, Irapuato

17 June 2025
17:30

Boxscore

Panama	29–61	Colombia
Scoring by quarter: 2–17, 11–13, 7–17, 9–14

Inforum, Irapuato

17 June 2025
20:00

Boxscore

Canada	76–51	Mexico
Scoring by quarter: 21–14, 22–13, 17–18, 16–6

Inforum, Irapuato

18 June 2025
17:30

Boxscore

Canada	107–15	Panama
Scoring by quarter: 35–1, 30–5, 20–6, 22–3

Inforum, Irapuato

18 June 2025
20:00

Boxscore

Mexico	45–39	Colombia
Scoring by quarter: 8–16, 14–7, 12–3, 11–13

Inforum, Irapuato

== Playoffs ==
=== Bracket ===
5th place match
Venezuela	46
Argentina	61
7th place match
Panama	72
Puerto Rico	95

5th–8th place semifinals
Panama	53
Venezuela	74
Argentina	64
Puerto Rico	58

Quarterfinals
A1	United States	131
B4	Panama	12
B2	Mexico	69
A3	Venezuela	44
A2	Argentina	39
B3	Colombia	44
B1	Canada	72
A4	Puerto Rico	47

Semifinals
United States	112
Mexico	50
Colombia	37
Canada	80

Final
United States	85
Canada	59
3rd place match
Mexico	51
Colombia	43

=== Quarterfinals ===
20 June 2025
12:30

Boxscore

United States	131–12	Panama
Scoring by quarter: 48–2, 28–6, 30–4, 25–0

Inforum, Irapuato

20 June 2025
15:00

Boxscore

Canada	72–47	Puerto Rico
Scoring by quarter: 19–8, 23–5, 13–22, 17–12

Inforum, Irapuato

20 June 2025
17:30

Boxscore

Argentina	39–44	Colombia
Scoring by quarter: 10–8, 4–2, 11–16, 14–18

Inforum, Irapuato

20 June 2025
20:00

Boxscore

Mexico	69–44	Venezuela
Scoring by quarter: 10–14, 21–8, 18–7, 20–15

Inforum, Irapuato

=== 5th–8th place semifinals ===
21 June 2025
12:30

Boxscore

Argentina	64–58	Puerto Rico
Scoring by quarter: 24–16, 23–12, 9–13, 8–17

Inforum, Irapuato

21 June 2025
15:00

Boxscore

Panama	53–74	Venezuela
Scoring by quarter: 8–17, 12–21, 11–12, 22–24

Inforum, Irapuato

=== 7th place match ===
22 June 2025
12:30

Boxscore

Panama	72–95	Puerto Rico
Scoring by quarter: 19–24, 22–21, 15–23, 16–27

Inforum, Irapuato

=== 5th place match ===
22 June 2025
15:00

Boxscore

Venezuela	46–61	Argentina
Scoring by quarter: 9–15, 11–19, 8–21, 18–6

Inforum, Irapuato

=== Semifinals ===
21 June 2025
17:30

Boxscore

Colombia	37–80	Canada
Scoring by quarter: 0–17, 8–21, 12–18, 17–24

Inforum, Irapuato

21 June 2025
20:00

Boxscore

United States	112–50	Mexico
Scoring by quarter: 27–17, 30–6, 30–10, 25–17

Inforum, Irapuato

=== 3rd place match ===
22 June 2025
17:30

Boxscore

Mexico	51–43	Colombia
Scoring by quarter: 12–16, 9–5, 18–7, 12–15

Inforum, Irapuato

=== Final ===
22 June 2025
20:00

Boxscore

United States	85–59	Canada
Scoring by quarter: 30–17, 21–12, 13–13, 21–17

Inforum, Irapuato

== Final standings ==
Rank	Team	Record
1st place, gold medalist(s)	United States	6–0
2nd place, silver medalist(s)	Canada	5–1
3rd place, bronze medalist(s)	Mexico	4–2
4	Colombia	2–4
5	Argentina	4–2
6	Venezuela	2–4
7	Puerto Rico	1–5
8	Panama	0–6

Qualified for the 2026 FIBA Under-17 Women's Basketball World Cup

== Awards ==
2025 FIBA U16 Women's AmeriCup champions

United States
Eighth title

=== Most Valuable Player ===
- (United States) Ivanna Wilson Manyacka

=== All-Star Five ===
- (United States) Ivanna Wilson Manyacka - Center
- (Mexico) Jimena Velázquez - Point guard
- (Canada) Avery Arije - Shooting guard
- (Colombia) Keren Bertel - Forward
- (United States) Eve Long - Forward
