= 2018 FIBA U15 Women's South American Championship =

International basketball competition

Tournament details
- Host country: Chile
- City: Puerto Aysén
- Dates: 29 October – 3 November 2018
- Teams: 8 (from 1 confederation)
- Venue: 1 (in 1 host city)

Final positions
- Champions: Chile (1st title)
- Runners-up: Ecuador
- Third place: Brazil

Official website
- www.fiba.basketball/history

The 2018 FIBA U15 Women's South American Championship was the 22nd edition of the South American basketball championship for under-15 women's national teams. The tournament was played at Polideportivo 21 de abril in Puerto Aysén, Chile, from 23 to 27 November 2022.

== Participating teams ==
- Argentina
- Brazil
- Chile
- Colombia
- Ecuador
- Paraguay
- Uruguay
- Venezuela

== First round ==
In the first round, the teams were drawn into two groups of four. The first two teams from each group advanced to the semifinals; the third and fourth teams advanced to the 5th–8th place playoffs.

All times are local (Time in Chile – UTC-3).

=== Group A ===
Pos	Team	Pld	W	L	PF	PA	PD	Pts	Qualification
1	Brazil	3	3	0	199	156	+43	6	Semifinals
2	Ecuador	3	2	1	189	166	+23	5	Semifinals
3	Paraguay	3	1	2	184	181	+3	4	5th–8th place playoffs
4	Venezuela	3	0	3	135	204	−69	3	5th–8th place playoffs

Source: FIBA

29 October 2018
15:30

Boxscore

Brazil	68–59	Paraguay
Scoring by quarter: 19–17, 18–7, 8–18, 23–17

Polideportivo 21 de abril, Puerto Aysén

29 October 2018
17:45

Boxscore

Ecuador	70–44	Venezuela
Scoring by quarter: 17–10, 22–8, 11–11, 20–15

Polideportivo 21 de abril, Puerto Aysén

30 October 2018
13:15

Boxscore

Venezuela	42–69	Brazil
Scoring by quarter: 15–15, 9–15, 4–17, 14–22

Polideportivo 21 de abril, Puerto Aysén

30 October 2018
15:30

Boxscore

Paraguay	60–64	Ecuador
Scoring by quarter: 11–22, 23–10, 15–19, 11–13

Polideportivo 21 de abril, Puerto Aysén

31 October 2018
13:15

Boxscore

Brazil	62–55	Ecuador
Scoring by quarter: 14–6, 18–10, 9–8, 21–31

Polideportivo 21 de abril, Puerto Aysén

31 October 2018
17:45

Boxscore

Venezuela	49–65	Paraguay
Scoring by quarter: 16–15, 8–13, 13–17, 12–20

Polideportivo 21 de abril, Puerto Aysén

=== Group B ===
Pos	Team	Pld	W	L	PF	PA	PD	Pts	Qualification
1	Argentina	3	3	0	180	150	+30	6	Semifinals
2	Chile	3	2	1	183	173	+10	5	Semifinals
3	Uruguay	3	1	2	183	195	−12	4	5th–8th place playoffs
4	Colombia	3	0	3	165	193	−28	3	5th–8th place playoffs

Source: FIBA

29 October 2018
13:15

Boxscore

Uruguay	71–64	Colombia
Scoring by quarter: 16–12, 17–13, 17–22, 21–17

Polideportivo 21 de abril, Puerto Aysén

29 October 2018
20:00

Boxscore

Argentina	60–50	Chile
Scoring by quarter: 16–12, 12–11, 10–14, 22–13

Polideportivo 21 de abril, Puerto Aysén

30 October 2018
17:45

Boxscore

Colombia	44–62	Argentina
Scoring by quarter: 10–18, 14–19, 10–10, 10–15

Polideportivo 21 de abril, Puerto Aysén

30 October 2018
20:00

Boxscore

Chile	73–56	Uruguay
Scoring by quarter: 21–12, 13–12, 19–20, 20–12

Polideportivo 21 de abril, Puerto Aysén

31 October 2018
15:30

Boxscore

Argentina	58–56	Uruguay
Scoring by quarter: 16–11, 17–14, 11–9, 14–22

Polideportivo 21 de abril, Puerto Aysén

31 October 2018
20:00

Boxscore

Colombia	57–60	Chile
Scoring by quarter: 18–21, 11–8, 15–26, 13–5

Polideportivo 21 de abril, Puerto Aysén

== 5th–8th place playoffs ==
5th–8th place semifinals
A3	Paraguay	54
B4	Colombia	70
B3	Uruguay	74
A4	Venezuela	56

5th place match
B4	Colombia	64
B3	Uruguay	40
7th place match
A3	Paraguay	86
A4	Venezuela	49

=== 5th–8th place semifinals ===
2 November 2018
13:15

Boxscore

Paraguay	54–70	Colombia
Scoring by quarter: 14–13, 12–24, 8–12, 20–21

Polideportivo 21 de abril, Puerto Aysén

2 November 2018
15:30

Boxscore

Uruguay	74–56	Venezuela
Scoring by quarter: 10–18, 17–17, 27–13, 20–8

Polideportivo 21 de abril, Puerto Aysén

=== 7th place match ===
3 November 2018
13:15

Boxscore

Paraguay	86–49	Venezuela
Scoring by quarter: 19–8, 24–13, 21–12, 22–16

Polideportivo 21 de abril, Puerto Aysén

=== 5th place match ===
3 November 2018
15:30

Boxscore

Colombia	64–40	Uruguay
Scoring by quarter: 19–10, 15–8, 15–8, 15–14

Polideportivo 21 de abril, Puerto Aysén

== Championship playoffs ==
5th–8th place semifinals
A1	Brazil	55
B2	Chile	60
B1	Argentina	51
A2	Ecuador	62

5th place match
B2	Chile	61
A2	Ecuador	43
7th place match
A1	Brazil	48
B1	Argentina	47

=== Semifinals ===
2 November 2018
17:45

Boxscore

Argentina	51–62	Ecuador
Scoring by quarter: 8–15, 14–16, 6–16, 23–15

Polideportivo 21 de abril, Puerto Aysén

2 November 2018
20:00

Boxscore

Brazil	55–60	Chile
Scoring by quarter: 10–13, 13–15, 12–17, 20–15

Polideportivo 21 de abril, Puerto Aysén

=== 3rd place match ===
3 November 2018
17:45

Boxscore

Brazil	48–47	Argentina
Scoring by quarter: 11–16, 10–4, 17–13, 10–14

Polideportivo 21 de abril, Puerto Aysén

=== Final ===
3 November 2018
20:00

Boxscore

Chile	61–43	Ecuador
Scoring by quarter: 14–5, 15–12, 15–9, 17–17

Polideportivo 21 de abril, Puerto Aysén

== Final standings ==
Rank	Team
1st place, gold medalist(s)	Chile
2nd place, silver medalist(s)	Ecuador
3rd place, bronze medalist(s)	Brazil
4	Argentina
5	Colombia
6	Uruguay
7	Paraguay
8	Venezuela

Qualified for the 2019 FIBA Under-16 Women's Americas Championship
