= 2022 FIBA U15 Women's South American Championship =

International basketball competition

Tournament details
- Host country: Chile
- City: Santiago
- Dates: 23–27 November 2022
- Teams: 8 (from 1 confederation)
- Venue: 1 (in 1 host city)

Final positions
- Champions: Argentina (7th title)
- Runners-up: Colombia
- Third place: Brazil

Official website
- www.fiba.basketball

The 2022 FIBA U15 Women's South American Championship was the 23rd edition of the South American basketball championship for under-15 women's national teams. The tournament was played at CEO 2 in Santiago, Chile, from 23 to 27 November 2022.

== Participating teams ==
- Argentina
- Bolivia
- Brazil
- Chile
- Colombia
- Ecuador
- Paraguay
- Uruguay

== First round ==
In the first round, the teams were drawn into two groups of four. The first two teams from each group advanced to the semifinals; the third and fourth teams advanced to the 5th–8th place playoffs.

All times are local (Time in Chile – UTC-3).

=== Group A ===
Pos	Team	Pld	W	L	PF	PA	PD	Pts	Qualification
1	Argentina	3	3	0	185	121	+64	6	Semifinals
2	Bolivia	3	2	1	161	188	−27	5	Semifinals
3	Paraguay	3	1	2	167	172	−5	4	5th–8th place playoffs
4	Chile	3	0	3	133	165	−32	3	5th–8th place playoffs

Source: FIBA

23 November 2022
18:00

Boxscore

Bolivia	70–66	Paraguay
Scoring by quarter: 22–13, 19–20, 14–17, 15–16

CEO 2, Santiago

23 November 2022
20:30

Boxscore

Argentina	54–40	Chile
Scoring by quarter: 15–10, 13–12, 19–8, 7–10

CEO 2, Santiago

24 November 2022
18:00

Boxscore

Paraguay	45–52	Argentina
Scoring by quarter: 14–20, 13–12, 6–10, 12–10

CEO 2, Santiago

24 November 2022
20:30

Boxscore

Chile	43–55	Bolivia
Scoring by quarter: 11–14, 13–4, 7–19, 12–18

CEO 2, Santiago

25 November 2022
18:00

Boxscore

Argentina	79–36	Bolivia
Scoring by quarter: 25–12, 24–6, 17–10, 13–8

CEO 2, Santiago

25 November 2022
20:30

Boxscore

Paraguay	56–50	Chile
Scoring by quarter: 11–16, 18–11, 13–13, 14–10

CEO 2, Santiago

=== Group B ===
Pos	Team	Pld	W	L	PF	PA	PD	Pts	Qualification
1	Colombia	3	3	0	215	162	+53	6	Semifinals
2	Brazil	3	2	1	203	186	+17	5	Semifinals
3	Uruguay	3	1	2	154	186	−32	4	5th–8th place playoffs
4	Ecuador	3	0	3	137	175	−38	3	5th–8th place playoffs

Source: FIBA

23 November 2022
12:30

Boxscore

Brazil	58–47	Ecuador
Scoring by quarter: 13–8, 11–11, 21–18, 13–10

CEO 2, Santiago

23 November 2022
15:00

Boxscore

Colombia	78–35	Uruguay
Scoring by quarter: 18–5, 24–7, 15–12, 21–11

CEO 2, Santiago

24 November 2022
12:30

Boxscore

Ecuador	52–59	Colombia
Scoring by quarter: 11–8, 11–16, 13–20, 17–15

CEO 2, Santiago

24 November 2022
15:00

Boxscore

Uruguay	61–70	Brazil
Scoring by quarter: 12–18, 13–12, 18–26, 18–14

CEO 2, Santiago

25 November 2022
12:30

Boxscore

Ecuador	38–58	Uruguay
Scoring by quarter: 13–9, 10–24, 11–16, 4–9

CEO 2, Santiago

25 November 2022
15:00

Boxscore

Colombia	78–75	Brazil
Scoring by quarter: 15–21, 20–13, 18–23, 25–18

CEO 2, Santiago

== 5th–8th place playoffs ==
5th–8th place semifinals
A3	Paraguay	50
B4	Ecuador	69
B3	Uruguay	46
A4	Chile	62

5th place match
B4	Ecuador	50
A4	Chile	52
7th place match
A3	Paraguay	58
B3	Uruguay	52

=== 5th–8th place semifinals ===
26 November 2022
12:30

Boxscore

Paraguay	50–69	Ecuador
Scoring by quarter: 15–19, 11–15, 9–18, 15–17

CEO 2, Santiago

26 November 2022
15:00

Boxscore

Uruguay	46–62	Chile
Scoring by quarter: 8–14, 16–22, 9–8, 13–18

CEO 2, Santiago

=== 7th place match ===
27 November 2022
12:30

Boxscore

Paraguay	58–52	Uruguay
Scoring by quarter: 16–8, 14–14, 13–15, 15–15

CEO 2, Santiago

=== 5th place match ===
27 November 2022
15:00

Boxscore

Ecuador	50–52	Chile
Scoring by quarter: 11–9, 14–16, 14–12, 11–15

CEO 2, Santiago

== Championship playoffs ==
Semifinals
A1	Argentina	60
B2	Brazil	37
B1	Colombia	70
A2	Bolivia	47

Final
A1	Argentina	66
B1	Colombia	61
3rd place match
B2	Brazil	72
A2	Bolivia	45

=== Semifinals ===
26 November 2022
18:00

Boxscore

Argentina	60–37	Brazil
Scoring by quarter: 25–7, 9–11, 17–7, 9–12

CEO 2, Santiago

26 November 2022
20:30

Boxscore

Colombia	70–47	Bolivia
Scoring by quarter: 23–11, 12–11, 20–10, 15–15

CEO 2, Santiago

=== 3rd place match ===
27 November 2022
18:00

Boxscore

Brazil	72–45	Bolivia
Scoring by quarter: 15–12, 13–12, 23–8, 21–13

CEO 2, Santiago

=== Final ===
27 November 2022
20:30

Boxscore

Argentina	66–61	Colombia
Scoring by quarter: 22–14, 13–17, 13–16, 18–14

CEO 2, Santiago

== Final standings ==
Rank	Team
1st place, gold medalist(s)	Argentina
2nd place, silver medalist(s)	Colombia
3rd place, bronze medalist(s)	Brazil
4	Bolivia
5	Chile
6	Ecuador
7	Paraguay
8	Uruguay

Qualified for the 2023 FIBA Under-16 Women's Americas Championship
