= Paraguay women's national under-15 basketball team =

Paraguay
- FIBA zone: FIBA Americas
- National federation: Confederación Paraguaya de Basquetbol

U17 World Cup
- Appearances: None

U16 AmeriCup
- Appearances: None

U15 South American Championship
- Appearances: 12–19 (Note: Data from 1987, 1990, 1992, 1998, 1999, 2000 and 2001 championships are not available)
- Medals: (silver) Silver: 1 (2005); (bronze) Bronze: 1 (2008)

The Paraguay women's national under-15 basketball team is a national basketball team of Paraguay, administered by the Confederación Paraguaya de Basquetbol. It represents the country in international under-15 women's basketball competitions.

== FIBA South America Under-15 Championship for Women participations ==
Year	Result
1996	6th
1997	9th
2004	5th
2005	2nd place, silver medalist(s)
2006	7th
2008	3rd place, bronze medalist(s)

Year	Result
2009	7th
2010	5th
2012	6th
2014	7th
2018	7th
2022	7th

== See also ==
- Paraguay women's national basketball team
- Paraguay women's national under-17 and under-18 basketball team
- Paraguay men's national under-17 basketball team
