= Colombia women's national under-17 basketball team =

Colombia
- FIBA zone: FIBA Americas
- National federation: Federación Colombiana de Baloncesto
- Coach: Ricardo Pinzón

U17 World Cup
- Appearances: 2

U16 AmeriCup
- Appearances: 3

U15 South American Championship
- Appearances: 13–18 (Note: Data from 1987, 1992, 1998, 1999 and 2000 championships are not available)
- Medals: (silver) Silver: (1990, 2022, 2024); (bronze) Bronze: (2001, 2007, 2016)

The Colombia women's national under-15, under-16 and under-17 basketball team is a national basketball team of Colombia, administered by the Federación Colombiana de Baloncesto. It represents the country in international under-15, under-16 and under-17 women's basketball competitions.

== Results ==
=== FIBA Under-17 World Cup ===
Year	Result
2018	14th
2026	12th

=== FIBA Under-16 AmeriCup ===
Year	Result
2017	4th
2023	5th
2025	4th

=== FIBA South America Under-15 Championship ===
Year	Result
1990	2nd place, silver medalist(s)
1997	5th
2001	3rd place, bronze medalist(s)
2004	4th
2005	5th
2007	3rd place, bronze medalist(s)
2009	6th

Year	Result
2011	4th
2014	4th
2016	3rd place, bronze medalist(s)
2018	5th
2022	2nd place, silver medalist(s)
2024	2nd place, silver medalist(s)

== See also ==
- Colombia women's national basketball team
- Colombia women's national under-19 basketball team
- Colombia men's national under-17 basketball team
