= Argentina women's national under-17 basketball team =

Argentina
- FIBA zone: FIBA Americas
- National federation: CAB
- Coach: Paula Buduni

U17 World Cup
- Appearances: 4
- Medals: None

U16 AmeriCup
- Appearances: 8
- Medals: (bronze) Bronze: 3 (2009, 2017, 2023)

U15 South American Championship
- Appearances: 22–23 (Note: Data from the 1990 championship are not available)
- Medals: (gold) Gold: 7 (1987, 1999, 2004, 2007, 2008, 2016, 2022); (silver) Silver: 9 (1992, 1994, 1996, 1997, 1998, 2000, 2001, 2009, 2010); (bronze) Bronze: 4 (2011, 2012, 2014, 2024)
Home	Away

The Argentina women's national under-15, under-16 and under-17 basketball team is a national basketball team of Argentina, administered by the Argentine Basketball Confederation. It represents the country in international under-15, under-16 and under-17 women's basketball competitions.

== Under-15 South American Championship participations ==
Year	Result
1987	1st place, gold medalist(s)
1992	2nd place, silver medalist(s)
1994	2nd place, silver medalist(s)
1996	2nd place, silver medalist(s)
1997	2nd place, silver medalist(s)
1998	2nd place, silver medalist(s)
1999	1st place, gold medalist(s)
2000	2nd place, silver medalist(s)

Year	Result
2001	2nd place, silver medalist(s)
2004	1st place, gold medalist(s)
2005	4th
2007	1st place, gold medalist(s)
2008	1st place, gold medalist(s)
2009	2nd place, silver medalist(s)
2010	2nd place, silver medalist(s)
2011	3rd place, bronze medalist(s)

Year	Result
2012	3rd place, bronze medalist(s)
2014	3rd place, bronze medalist(s)
2016	1st place, gold medalist(s)
2018	4th
2022	1st place, gold medalist(s)
2024	3rd place, bronze medalist(s)

== Under-16 AmeriCup participations ==
Year	Result
2009	3rd place, bronze medalist(s)
2011	5th
2013	7th
2015	6th
2017	3rd place, bronze medalist(s)
2021	4th
2023	3rd place, bronze medalist(s)
2025	5th

== Under-17 World Cup record ==
Year	Pos.	Pld	W	L
(France) 2010	9th	7	4	3
(Netherlands) 2012	Did not qualify			
(Czech Republic) 2014	Did not qualify			
(Spain) 2016	Did not qualify			
(Belarus) 2018	13th	7	4	3
(Hungary) 2022	15th	7	1	6
(Mexico) 2024	16th	7	0	7
(Czech Republic) 2026	Did not qualify			
(Indonesia) 2028	To be determined			
Total	4/9	28	9	19

== History ==
=== Under-15 South American Championship ===
After Brazil, Argentina is the second most successful team in the number of medals won at the South American Championship (seven gold, nine silver and three bronze medals).

=== Under-16 AmeriCup ===
The team qualified on seven occasions. Argentina's best performance were three 3rd places (2009, 2017, 2023).

In 2021, Angelina Giacone stood out as one of the more versatile players in the tournament averaging 7 points and 7.7 rebounds per game, but it was a team effort defensively and Delfina Cergneux led the charge on the boards to keep Argentina in every game.

=== Under-17 World Cup ===
Argentina qualified for the 2010 FIBA Under-17 World Championship for Women, the inaugural edition where it finished 9th, better than any other team from South America.

== See also ==
- Argentina women's national basketball team
- Argentina women's national under-19 basketball team
- Argentina men's national under-17 basketball team
