= Chile women's national under-15 and under-16 basketball team =

U15 and U16 national Chilean basketball team

Chile
- FIBA zone: FIBA Americas
- National federation: Federación de Basquetbol de Chile

U17 World Cup
- Appearances: None

U16 AmeriCup
- Appearances: 2
- Medals: (bronze) Bronze: 1 (2019)

U15 South American Championship
- Appearances: 14–20 (Note: Data from 1987, 1990, 1992, 1998, 1999 and 2001 championships are not available)
- Medals: (gold) Gold: 1 (2018); (silver) Silver: 1 (2011); (bronze) Bronze: 1 (2000)
Home	Away

The Chile women's national under-15 and under-16 basketball team is a national basketball team of Chile, administered by the Federación de Basquetbol de Chile. It represents the country in international under-15 and under-16 women's basketball competitions.

== FIBA South America Under-15 Championship for Women participations ==
Year	Result
1994	4th
1997	8th
2000	3rd place, bronze medalist(s)
2006	6th
2007	6th
2008	5th
2009	5th

Year	Result
2010	4th
2011	2nd place, silver medalist(s)
2014	6th
2016	6th
2018	1st place, gold medalist(s)
2022	5th
2024	5th

== FIBA Under-16 Women's AmeriCup participations ==
Year	Result
2019	3rd place, bronze medalist(s)
2021	7th

== History ==
=== Under-15 South American Championship ===
The team won three medals in this competition, one of each kind.

=== Under-16 Americas Championship ===
The team qualified on two occasions.

In 2021, Chile won their final match of group play to move to 1-2 record. Major performances came from Vania Vega who recorded 17 points, 7 rebounds and 5 steals in the win over Mexico.

=== Under-17 World Cup ===
The team qualified for the 2020 FIBA Under-17 Women's Basketball World Cup, their most noteworthy accomplishment so far. Unfortunately, the tournament was cancelled due to the COVID-19 pandemic.

== See also ==
- Chile women's national basketball team
- Chile women's national under-19 basketball team
- Chile men's national under-15 and under-16 basketball team
