= Venezuela women's national under-15 and under-16 basketball team =

Venezuela
- FIBA zone: FIBA Americas
- National federation: Federación Venezolana de Baloncesto

U17 World Cup
- Appearances: None

U16 AmeriCup
- Appearances: 5
- Medals: None

U15 South American Championship
- Appearances: 15–19 (Note: Data from 1992, 1999, 2000 and 2001 championships are not available)
- Medals: (gold) Gold: 1 (2024); (silver) Silver: 4 (2006, 2012, 2014, 2016); (bronze) Bronze: 7 (1987, 1990, 1998, 2004, 2005, 2009, 2010)

The Venezuela women's national under-15 and under-16 basketball team is a national basketball team of Venezuela, administered by the Federación Venezolana de Baloncesto. It represents the country in international under-15 and under-16 women's basketball competitions.

== FIBA South America Under-15 Championship for Women participations ==
Year	Result
1987	3rd place, bronze medalist(s)
1990	3rd place, bronze medalist(s)
1997	6th
1998	3rd place, bronze medalist(s)
2004	3rd place, bronze medalist(s)
2005	3rd place, bronze medalist(s)
2006	2nd place, silver medalist(s)
2007	5th

Year	Result
2009	3rd place, bronze medalist(s)
2010	3rd place, bronze medalist(s)
2012	2nd place, silver medalist(s)
2014	2nd place, silver medalist(s)
2016	2nd place, silver medalist(s)
2018	8th
2024	1st place, gold medalist(s)

== FIBA Under-16 Women's AmeriCup participations ==
Year	Result
2011	6th
2013	6th
2015	7th
2017	6th
2025	6th

== See also ==
- Venezuela women's national basketball team
- Venezuela women's national under-17 and under-18 basketball team
- Venezuela men's national under-15 and under-16 basketball team
