= Ecuador women's national under-15 and under-16 basketball team =

Ecuador
- FIBA zone: FIBA Americas
- National federation: Federación Ecuatoriana de Básquetbol

U17 World Cup
- Appearances: None

U16 AmeriCup
- Appearances: 1
- Medals: None

U15 South American Championship
- Appearances: 14–20 (Note: Data from 1987, 1990, 1992, 1998, 2000 and 2001 championships are not available)
- Medals: (silver) Silver: 1 (2018); (bronze) Bronze: 2 (1999, 2006)

The Ecuador women's national under-15 and under-16 basketball team is a national basketball team of Ecuador, administered by the Federación Ecuatoriana de Básquetbol. It represents the country in international under-15 and under-16 women's basketball competitions.

== FIBA South America Under-15 Championship for Women participations ==
Year	Result
1996	5th
1997	7th
1999	3rd place, bronze medalist(s)
2005	7th
2006	3rd place, bronze medalist(s)
2007	4th
2008	4th

Year	Result
2009	4th
2011	5th
2014	5th
2016	4th
2018	2nd place, silver medalist(s)
2022	6th
2024	6th

== FIBA Under-16 Women's AmeriCup participations ==
Year	Result
2019	5th

== See also ==
- Ecuador women's national basketball team
- Ecuador women's national under-17 and under-18 basketball team
- Ecuador men's national under-15 basketball team
