= Canada women's national under-17 basketball team =

Canada
- FIBA zone: FIBA Americas
- National federation: Canada Basketball
- Coach: Jessica Roque

U17 World Cup
- Appearances: 8
- Medals: (silver) Silver: (2024); (bronze) Bronze: (2012)

U16 AmeriCup
- Appearances: 9
- Medals: (gold) Gold: (2015); (silver) Silver: (2009, 2013, 2017, 2019, 2021, 2023, 2025); (bronze) Bronze: (2011)

The Canada women's national under-16 and under-17 basketball team is a national basketball team of Canada, administered by Canada Basketball. It represents the country in international under-16 and under-17 women's basketball competitions.

== Tournament record ==
=== U17 World Cup ===
Year	Pos.	Pld	W	L
(France) 2010	11th	7	2	5
(Netherlands) 2012	3rd place, bronze medalist(s)	8	5	3
(Czech Republic) 2014	6th	7	3	4
(Spain) 2016	7th	6	4	2
(Belarus) 2018	9th	7	5	2
(Hungary) 2022	4th	7	4	3
(Mexico) 2024	2nd place, silver medalist(s)	7	6	1
(Czech Republic) 2026	4th	7	5	2
Total	8/8	56	34	22

=== U16 AmeriCup ===
Year	Result
2009	2nd place, silver medalist(s)
2011	3rd place, bronze medalist(s)
2013	2nd place, silver medalist(s)
2015	1st place, gold medalist(s)
2017	2nd place, silver medalist(s)
2019	2nd place, silver medalist(s)
2021	2nd place, silver medalist(s)
2023	2nd place, silver medalist(s)
2025	2nd place, silver medalist(s)

== See also ==
- Canada women's national basketball team
- Canada women's national under-19 basketball team
- Canada men's national under-17 basketball team
