= 2018 FIBA Under-17 Women's Basketball World Cup =

Tournament details
- Host country: Belarus
- Dates: 21–29 July
- Teams: 16 (from 5 confederations)
- Venue: 2 (in 1 host city)

Final positions
- Champions: United States (4th title)

Tournament statistics
- MVP: (United States) Jordan Horston
- Top scorer: (Mali) S. Koné (16.9)
- Top rebounds: (Mali) Sangare (13.1)
- Top assists: (Argentina) Chagas (6.6)
- PPG (Team): United States (89.3)
- RPG (Team): United States (55.6)
- APG (Team): United States (26.1)

Official website
- www.fiba.basketball

The 2018 FIBA Under-17 Women's Basketball World Cup (Belarusian: Кубак свету па баскетболе сярод жанчын да 17 гадоў ФІБА 2018) was an international basketball competition held from 21 to 29 July 2018 in Minsk, Belarus. It was the fifth edition of the FIBA Under-17 Women's Basketball World Cup. Sixteen national teams competed in the tournament.

The United States won their fourth title after defeating France in the final.

== Venues ==
| Minsk | | 2018 FIBA Under-17 Women's Basketball World Cup is located in Belarus |
| Minsk Sports Palace | Falcon Club Arena | 2018 FIBA Under-17 Women's Basketball World Cup is located in Belarus |
| Capacity: 3,311 | Capacity: 3,000 | 2018 FIBA Under-17 Women's Basketball World Cup is located in Belarus |

== Qualified teams ==
| Means of Qualification | Date | Venue | Berths | Qualifiers |
|---|---|---|---|---|
| Host Nation | 3 May 2017 | | 1 | Belarus |
| 2017 FIBA Under-16 Women's Americas Championship | 7 – 11 June 2017 | (Argentina) Buenos Aires | 4 | United States; Canada; Argentina; Colombia |
| 2017 FIBA Under-16 Women's African Championship | 5 – 12 August 2017 | (Mozambique) Beira | 2 | Mali; Angola |
| 2017 FIBA Under-16 Women's European Championship | 4 – 12 August 2017 | (France) Bourges | 5 | Italy; France; Hungary; Latvia; Spain |
| 2017 FIBA Under-16 Women's Asian Championship | 22 – 28 October 2017 | (India) Bangalore | 4 | Australia; China; New Zealand; Japan |
| Total | | | 16 | |

== Preliminary round ==
The draw ceremony was held on 6 March 2018.

=== Group A ===
| Pos | Team | Pld | W | L | PF | PA | PD | Pts |
|---|---|---|---|---|---|---|---|---|
| 1 | France | 3 | 3 | 0 | 202 | 122 | +80 | 6 |
| 2 | Japan | 3 | 2 | 1 | 229 | 164 | +65 | 5 |
| 3 | Belarus (H) | 3 | 1 | 2 | 165 | 243 | −78 | 4 |
| 4 | Colombia | 3 | 0 | 3 | 162 | 229 | −67 | 3 |

Source: FIBA
Rules for classification: 1) Points; 2) Head-to-head results; 3) Points difference; 4) Points scored.
(H) Hosts

21 July 2018
17:30

Boxscore

| Japan | 53–60 | France |
Scoring by quarter: 10–12, 14–17, 21–11, 8–20
| Pts: three players 8 Rebs: Miura, Takahashi 6 Asts: Takahashi 4 | | Pts: Rupert 18; Rebs: Rupert 16; Asts: Chéry 5 |

Minsk Sports Palace, Minsk
Attendance: 200
Referees: Vasiliki Tsaroucha (GRE), Yuen Chun Yip (HKG), Ahmed Al-Shuwaili (IRQ)

21 July 2018
20:30

Boxscore

| Colombia | 75–79 (OT) | Belarus |
Scoring by quarter: 25–14, 11–19, 12–15, 19–19, Overtime: 8–12
| Pts: Álvarez 35; Rebs: Morales 13; Asts: Álvarez 6 | | Pts: Vasilevich 27; Rebs: Vasilevich 12; Asts: Vasilevich 7 |

Minsk Sports Palace, Minsk
Attendance: 2,000
Referees: Andris Aunkrogers (LAT), Sadegh Ghanbaridamanab (IRN), Ivana Ivanović (SRB)

22 July 2018
20:00

Boxscore

| France | 78–35 | Colombia |
Scoring by quarter: 21–9, 24–12, 18–10, 15–4
| Pts: Wadoux 14; Rebs: Guennoc 10; Asts: Fathoux 8 | | Pts: Morales 12; Rebs: Chivata, González 6 Asts: Álvarez 4 |

Falcon Club Arena, Minsk
Attendance: 170
Referees: Andrei Sharapa (BLR), Christian Wilmore (BAH), Imran Baig (IND)

22 July 2018
20:30

Boxscore

| Belarus | 52–104 | Japan |
Scoring by quarter: 9–21, 6–28, 22–37, 15–18
| Pts: Samailiuk 12; Rebs: Sinelshchykova 7 Asts: Vasilevich 6 | | Pts: Miura 19; Rebs: Hayashi, Hirashita 6 Asts: Suzuki 9 |

Minsk Sports Palace, Minsk
Attendance: 1,500
Referees: Michał Proc (POL), Hortencia Sánchez (MEX), Ivor Matějek (CZE)

24 July 2018
20:30

Boxscore

| Japan | 72–52 | Colombia |
Scoring by quarter: 15–10, 21–9, 18–15, 18–18
| Pts: Noguchi 17; Rebs: Hirashita, McArthur 8 Asts: Fujita, Takahashi 4 | | Pts: Álvarez 12; Rebs: González 12; Asts: Álvarez 4 |

Falcon Club Arena, Minsk
Attendance: 40
Referees: Alejandro Sánchez (URU), Sadegh Ghanbaridamanab (IRN), Sarty Nghixulifwa (NAM)

24 July 2018
20:30

Boxscore

| Belarus | 34–64 | France |
Scoring by quarter: 9–21, 10–14, 11–13, 4–16
| Pts: Yakhnavets 9 Rebs: Siamiletnikava 7 Asts: Siamiletnikava 7 | | Pts: Ewodo 11; Rebs: Mahoutou 9 Asts: Ewodo 6 |

Minsk Sports Palace, Minsk
Attendance: 2,500
Referees: Ryan Jones (NZL), Preeda Muongmee (THA), Virginia Peruchini (ARG)

=== Group B ===
| Pos | Team | Pld | W | L | PF | PA | PD | Pts |
|---|---|---|---|---|---|---|---|---|
| 1 | United States | 3 | 3 | 0 | 285 | 137 | +148 | 6 |
| 2 | Italy | 3 | 2 | 1 | 194 | 206 | −12 | 5 |
| 3 | China | 3 | 1 | 2 | 176 | 228 | −52 | 4 |
| 4 | Mali | 3 | 0 | 3 | 151 | 235 | −84 | 3 |

Source: FIBA
Rules for classification: 1) Points; 2) Head-to-head results; 3) Points difference; 4) Points scored.

21 July 2018
13:00

Boxscore

| China | 69–49 | Mali |
Scoring by quarter: 15–16, 16–15, 13–15, 25–3
| Pts: Liu 16; Rebs: Ma 10; Asts: Zhou 9 | | Pts: Sangare 14; Rebs: Sangare 14; Asts: F. Koné 5 |

Minsk Sports Palace, Minsk
Attendance: 120
Referees: Michał Proc (POL), Andrada Csender (ROU), Opeyemi Ogunleye (NGA)

21 July 2018
15:15

Boxscore

| United States | 86–48 | Italy |
Scoring by quarter: 23–10, 20–12, 23–8, 20–18
| Pts: Jones 13; Rebs: Horston 10; Asts: Bueckers 5 | | Pts: Natali 16; Rebs: Spinelli 5 Asts: three players 2 |

Minsk Sports Palace, Minsk
Attendance: 300
Referees: Alejandro Sánchez (URU), Virginia Peruchini (ARG), Ryan Jones (NZL)

22 July 2018
13:15

Boxscore

| Italy | 72–57 | China |
Scoring by quarter: 20–12, 14–20, 15–16, 23–9
| Pts: Natali 21; Rebs: Gilli 13; Asts: Orsili 7 | | Pts: Zheng 16; Rebs: Yang 7 Asts: Ma 3 |

Falcon Club Arena, Minsk
Attendance: 150
Referees: Ryan Jones (NZL), Virginia Peruchini (ARG), Sarty Nghixulifwa (NAM)

22 July 2018
15:30

Boxscore

| Mali | 39–92 | United States |
Scoring by quarter: 9–29, 9–30, 12–15, 9–18
| Pts: Sissoko 11; Rebs: Sangare 11; Asts: F. Koné, Sangare 3 | | Pts: Fudd 18; Rebs: Taylor 11; Asts: Horston 5 |

Falcon Club Arena, Minsk
Attendance: 170
Referees: Andris Aunkrogers (LAT), Yuen Chun Yip (HKG), Opeyemi Ogunleye (NGA)

24 July 2018
18:15

Boxscore

| Italy | 74–63 | Mali |
Scoring by quarter: 22–20, 14–11, 18–22, 20–10
| Pts: Natali 18; Rebs: Orsili 6 Asts: Orsili 5 | | Pts: Sangare 20; Rebs: Sangare 18; Asts: F. Koné 6 |

Falcon Club Arena, Minsk
Attendance: 80
Referees: Andris Aunkrogers (LAT), Andrada Csender (ROU), Amr Aboollo (EGY)

24 July 2018
18:15

Boxscore

| China | 50–107 | United States |
Scoring by quarter: 12–33, 10–24, 16–26, 12–24
| Pts: Huang, Ma 10; Rebs: Jiyuan 6 Asts: four players 2 | | Pts: Horston 18; Rebs: Brink 11; Asts: Horston 8 |

Minsk Sports Palace, Minsk
Attendance: 500
Referees: Vasiliki Tsaroucha (GRE), Judith Mendoza (CUB), Hortencia Sánchez (MEX)

=== Group C ===
| Pos | Team | Pld | W | L | PF | PA | PD | Pts |
|---|---|---|---|---|---|---|---|---|
| 1 | Hungary | 3 | 3 | 0 | 210 | 177 | +33 | 6 |
| 2 | Argentina | 3 | 2 | 1 | 197 | 204 | −7 | 5 |
| 3 | Spain | 3 | 1 | 2 | 206 | 181 | +25 | 4 |
| 4 | New Zealand | 3 | 0 | 3 | 160 | 211 | −51 | 3 |

Source: FIBA
Rules for classification: 1) Points; 2) Head-to-head results; 3) Points difference; 4) Points scored.

21 July 2018
13:15

Boxscore

| New Zealand | 48–83 | Spain |
Scoring by quarter: 19–22, 12–17, 9–18, 8–26
| Pts: Dalton, Kailahi-Fulu 11; Rebs: Kailahi-Fulu 12; Asts: Leger-Walker, Pupuke-Robati 2 | | Pts: Carrera 17; Rebs: Carbonell 8 Asts: Galve, Méndez 3 |

Falcon Club Arena, Minsk
Attendance: 120
Referees: Andrei Sharapa (BLR), Christian Wilmore (BAH), Amr Aboollo (EGY)

21 July 2018
15:30

Boxscore

| Argentina | 61–85 | Hungary |
Scoring by quarter: 14–19, 13–28, 17–19, 17–19
| Pts: Acevedo, Chagas 15; Rebs: Gauna 6 Asts: Chagas 8 | | Pts: Dombai 18; Rebs: three players 5 Asts: Angyal 5 |

Falcon Club Arena, Minsk
Attendance: 150
Referees: Ivor Matějek (CZE), Yuji Hirahara (JPN), Sara El-Sharnouby (EGY)

22 July 2018
13:45

Boxscore

| Hungary | 68–60 | New Zealand |
Scoring by quarter: 23–15, 17–10, 15–18, 13–17
| Pts: Varga 16; Rebs: Varga 13; Asts: Dombai 4 | | Pts: Manumaleuga 23; Rebs: Pupuke-Robati 13; Asts: Pupuke-Robati 5 |

Minsk Sports Palace, Minsk
Attendance: 120
Referees: Gina Cross (USA), Andrada Csender (ROU), Zdenko Tomašovič (SVK)

22 July 2018
16:00

Boxscore

| Spain | 67–76 (OT) | Argentina |
Scoring by quarter: 13–13, 14–16, 22–15, 15–20, Overtime: 3–12
| Pts: Carrera 21; Rebs: Hermosa 12; Asts: Pueyo, Puiggros 4 | | Pts: Acevedo 23; Rebs: Chagas 12; Asts: Chagas 12 |

Minsk Sports Palace, Minsk
Attendance: 200
Referees: Alejandro Sánchez (URU), Yuji Hirahara (JPN), Wang Zebo (CHN)

24 July 2018
13:45

Boxscore

| Spain | 56–57 | Hungary |
Scoring by quarter: 19–13, 13–9, 10–19, 14–16
| Pts: Hermosa 15; Rebs: Carrera 10; Asts: Méndez 4 | | Pts: Varga 14; Rebs: Varga 10; Asts: Angyal 8 |

Minsk Sports Palace, Minsk
Attendance: 240
Referees: Michał Proc (POL), Ahmed Al-Shuwaili (IRQ), Zdenko Tomašovič (SVK)

24 July 2018
13:45

Boxscore

| Argentina | 60–52 | New Zealand |
Scoring by quarter: 13–16, 10–15, 15–6, 22–15
| Pts: Acevedo 21; Rebs: three players 6 Asts: Chagas 6 | | Pts: Pupuke-Robati 17; Rebs: Pupuke-Robati 9 Asts: Leger-Walker 10 |

Falcon Club Arena, Minsk
Attendance: 40
Referees: Yevgeniy Mikheyev (KAZ), Christian Wilmore (BAH), Imran Baig (IND)

=== Group D ===
| Pos | Team | Pld | W | L | PF | PA | PD | Pts |
|---|---|---|---|---|---|---|---|---|
| 1 | Australia | 3 | 3 | 0 | 205 | 132 | +73 | 6 |
| 2 | Canada | 3 | 2 | 1 | 179 | 151 | +28 | 5 |
| 3 | Latvia | 3 | 1 | 2 | 160 | 172 | −12 | 4 |
| 4 | Angola | 3 | 0 | 3 | 126 | 215 | −89 | 3 |

Source: FIBA
Rules for classification: 1) Points; 2) Head-to-head results; 3) Points difference; 4) Points scored.

21 July 2018
17:45

Boxscore

| Latvia | 51–65 | Canada |
Scoring by quarter: 4–14, 16–13, 13–20, 18–18
| Pts: Meldere 20; Rebs: Meldere 11; Asts: Nulle, Vihmane 3 | | Pts: Russell 11; Rebs: Edwards 9 Asts: Te-Biasu, Wilson 4 |

Falcon Club Arena, Minsk
Attendance: 350
Referees: Gina Cross (USA), Hortencia Sánchez (MEX), Zdenko Tomašovič (SVK)

21 July 2018
20:00

Boxscore

| Angola | 43–81 | Australia |
Scoring by quarter: 9–21, 11–22, 12–20, 11–18
| Pts: Antonio 10; Rebs: Dizeko 13; Asts: Dizeko 4 | | Pts: Amoore 16; Rebs: Hannan 9 Asts: Amoore 4 |

Falcon Club Arena, Minsk
Attendance: 250
Referees: Yevgeniy Mikheyev (KAZ), Imran Baig (IND), Sarty Nghixulifwa (NAM)

22 July 2018
17:45

Boxscore

| Australia | 60–41 | Latvia |
Scoring by quarter: 15–2, 10–9, 21–14, 14–16
| Pts: Heal 17; Rebs: Heal 11; Asts: Heal 3 | | Pts: Miķelsone 8 Rebs: Kļeščova 10; Asts: Indriķe, Vinerte 2 |

Falcon Club Arena, Minsk
Attendance: 300
Referees: Vasiliki Tsaroucha (GRE), Ahmed Al-Shuwaili (IRQ), Yevgeniy Mikheyev(KAZ)

22 July 2018
18:15

Boxscore

| Canada | 66–36 | Angola |
Scoring by quarter: 12–9, 17–13, 14–9, 23–5
| Pts: Russell 18; Rebs: Masikewich 9 Asts: Te-Biasu 3 | | Pts: Antonio 14; Rebs: Antonio 8 Asts: Dizeko 3 |

Minsk Sports Palace, Minsk
Attendance: 250
Referees: Amr Aboollo (EGY), Joenard Garcia (PHI), Sadegh Ghanbaridamanab (IRN)

24 July 2018
16:00

Boxscore

| Angola | 47–68 | Latvia |
Scoring by quarter: 13–13, 12–19, 11–24, 11–12
| Pts: Caetano 13; Rebs: Dizeko 10; Asts: Dizeko 3 | | Pts: Vihmane 17; Rebs: Meldere 12; Asts: Kļeščova 7 |

Falcon Club Arena, Minsk
Attendance: 65
Referees: Gina Cross (USA), Ivor Matějek (CZE), Opeyemi Ogunleye (NGA)

24 July 2018
16:00

Boxscore

| Canada | 48–64 | Australia |
Scoring by quarter: 10–15, 15–26, 10–11, 12–12
| Pts: Russell 17; Rebs: Ejim 7 Asts: Ntambue 4 | | Pts: Scanlon 22; Rebs: Anstey 12; Asts: Heal, Palmer 3 |

Minsk Sports Palace, Minsk
Attendance: 300
Referees: Andrei Sharapa (BLR), Yuji Hirahara (JPN), Yuen Chun Yip (HKG)

== Final round ==
=== Bracket ===
Round of 16
25 July
France | 78
Mali | 57
25 July
Argentina | 58
Latvia | 72
25 July
Belarus | 50
Italy | 65
25 July
New Zealand | 37
Australia | 77
25 July
Japan | 82
China | 73
25 July
Hungary | 88
Angola | 48
25 July
Colombia | 42
United States | 98
25 July
Spain | 72
Canada | 50

Quarterfinals
27 July
France | 67
Latvia | 43
27 July
Italy | 46
Australia | 64
27 July
Japan | 62
Hungary | 74
27 July
United States | 66
Spain | 31

Semifinals
28 July
France | 68
Australia | 58
28 July
Hungary | 39
United States | 84

Final
29 July
France | 40
United States | 92
Third place
29 July
Australia | 57
Hungary | 51

=== Round of 16 ===
25 July 2018
13:15

Boxscore

| Hungary | 88–48 | Angola |
Scoring by quarter: 24–10, 26–4, 26–16, 12–18
| Pts: Dombai 14; Rebs: three players 6 Asts: Horváth, Mányoky 4 | | Pts: Antonio, Caetano 12; Rebs: Dizeko 6 Asts: Dizeko 2 |

Falcon Club Arena, Minsk
Attendance: 50
Referees: Andris Aunkrogers (LAT), Christian Wilmore (BAH), Ivana Ivanović (SRB)

25 July 2018
13:45

Boxscore

| Argentina | 58–72 | Latvia |
Scoring by quarter: 9–19, 15–20, 15–13, 19–20
| Pts: Fontana 25; Rebs: Fontana 16; Asts: Chagas 7 | | Pts: Meldere 21; Rebs: Meldere 14; Asts: Kļeščova 5 |

Minsk Sports Palace, Minsk
Attendance: 120
Referees: Andrei Sharapa (BLR), Ahmed Al-Shuwaili (IRQ), Amr Aboollo (EGY)

25 July 2018
15:30

Boxscore

| Spain | 72–50 | Canada |
Scoring by quarter: 14–12, 21–6, 14–17, 23–15
| Pts: Hermosa 19; Rebs: Hermosa 16; Asts: Méndez, Puiggros 4 | | Pts: Masikewich, Russell 9 Rebs: Ejim, Masikewich 6 Asts: Te-Biasu, Wilson 3 |

Falcon Club Arena, Minsk
Attendance: 80
Referees: Vasiliki Tsaroucha (GRE), Virginia Peruchini (ARG), Andrada Csender (ROU)

25 July 2018
16:00

Boxscore

| New Zealand | 37–77 | Australia |
Scoring by quarter: 7–23, 12–17, 6–20, 12–17
| Pts: Leger-Walker 15; Rebs: Kailahi-Fulu, Leger-Walker 7 Asts: Manumaleuga, Pupuke-Robati 2 | | Pts: Heal 20; Rebs: Emma-Nnopu 9 Asts: Palmer 7 |

Minsk Sports Palace, Minsk
Attendance: 60
Referees: Alejandro Sánchez (URU), Sadegh Ghanbaridamanab (IRN), Sarty Nghixulifwa (NAM)

25 July 2018
17:45

Boxscore

| Japan | 82–73 | China |
Scoring by quarter: 23–16, 28–26, 10–16, 21–15
| Pts: Noguchi 17; Rebs: Noguchi 13; Asts: Fujita, Hayashi 3 | | Pts: Zheng 28; Rebs: Liu 10; Asts: Huang 4 |

Falcon Club Arena, Minsk
Attendance: 250
Referees: Michał Proc (POL), Joenard Garcia (PHI), Hortencia Sánchez (MEX)

25 July 2018
18:15

Boxscore

| France | 78–57 | Mali |
Scoring by quarter: 17–14, 18–15, 27–14, 16–14
| Pts: Wadoux 15; Rebs: Chéry 10; Asts: Fauthoux 6 | | Pts: S. Koné 26; Rebs: Sangare 17; Asts: Sissoko 6 |

Minsk Sports Palace, Minsk
Attendance: 100
Referees: Yevgeniy Mikheyev (KAZ), Yuji Hirahara (JPN), Imran Baig (IND)

25 July 2018
20:00

Boxscore

| Colombia | 42–98 | United States |
Scoring by quarter: 8–26, 19–20, 11–20, 4–32
| Pts: Morales, Quesada 7 Rebs: Morales 5 Asts: Chivata 3 | | Pts: Boston 21; Rebs: Boston, Jones 9 Asts: Bueckers 8 |

Falcon Club Arena, Minsk
Attendance: 250
Referees: Ryan Jones (NZL), Yuen Chun Yip (HKG), Opeyemi Ogunleye (NGA)

25 July 2018
20:30

Boxscore

| Belarus | 50–65 | Italy |
Scoring by quarter: 19–17, 5–17, 12–19, 14–12
| Pts: Vasilevich 13; Rebs: Babak 8 Asts: Durmanava 3 | | Pts: Spinelli 15; Rebs: Pastrello 8 Asts: Orsili, Pastrello 6 |

Minsk Sports Palace, Minsk
Attendance: 1,500
Referees: Gina Cross (USA), Zdenko Tomašovič (SVK), Ivor Matějek (CZE)

=== 9–16th classification playoffs ===
Classification quarterfinals
27 July
Mali | 63
Argentina | 48
27 July
Belarus | 59
New Zealand | 73
27 July
China | 97
Angola | 41
27 July
Colombia | 51
Canada | 71

Classification semifinals
28 July
Mali (OT) | 66
New Zealand | 64
28 July
China | 59
Canada | 74

Ninth place match
29 July
Mali | 50
Canada | 58
Eleventh place match
29 July
New Zealand | 66
China | 88

Classification semifinals
28 July
Argentina | 61
Belarus | 58
28 July
Angola | 44
Colombia | 49

13th place match
29 July
Argentina | 51
Colombia | 47
15th place match
29 July
Belarus | 70
Angola | 58

==== 9–16th place quarterfinals ====
27 July 2018
12:00

Boxscore

| China | 97–41 | Angola |
Scoring by quarter: 18–8, 28–6, 26–18, 25–9
| Pts: Liu 21; Rebs: Ma 11; Asts: Sui, Yang 6 | | Pts: Lourenço 13; Rebs: Dizeko 7 Asts: Antonio 4 |

Falcon Club Arena, Minsk
Attendance: 40
Referees: Ivor Matějek (CZE), Christian Wilmore (BAH), Opeyemi Ogunleye (NGA)

27 July 2018
13:00

Boxscore

| Mali | 63–48 | Argentina |
Scoring by quarter: 19–8, 12–16, 20–13, 12–11
| Pts: S. Koné 23; Rebs: S. Koné 17; Asts: four players 4 | | Pts: Chagas 18; Rebs: D'Agostino 6 Asts: Chagas, Fontana 5 |

Minsk Sports Palace, Minsk
Attendance: 70
Referees: Alejandro Sánchez (URU), Joenard Garcia (PHI), Sarty Nghixulifwa (NAM)

27 July 2018
14:15

Boxscore

| Colombia | 51–71 | Canada |
Scoring by quarter: 13–12, 12–25, 14–18, 12–16
| Pts: Álvarez 20; Rebs: González 5 Asts: Chivata, Ulloa 4 | | Pts: Wilson 12; Rebs: Ejim 11; Asts: Te-Biasu 4 |

Falcon Club Arena, Minsk
Attendance: 50
Referees: Andrei Sharapa (BLR), Sadegh Ghanbaridamanab (IRN), Amr Aboollo (EGY)

27 July 2018
15:30

Boxscore

| Belarus | 59–73 | New Zealand |
Scoring by quarter: 8–10, 21–18, 16–24, 14–21
| Pts: Yakhnavets 10; Rebs: Siamiletnikava 5 Asts: Vasilevich 6 | | Pts: Dalton 14; Rebs: Kailahi-Fulu 15; Asts: Pupuke-Robati 6 |

Minsk Sports Palace, Minsk
Attendance: 250
Referees: Yuji Hirahara (JPN), Preeda Muongmee (THA), Imran Baig (IND)

==== 13–16th place semifinals ====
28 July 2018
11:00

Boxscore

| Angola | 44–49 | Colombia |
Scoring by quarter: 9–18, 9–9, 11–10, 15–12
| Pts: Dizeko 16; Rebs: Dizeko 12; Asts: Dizeko 4 | | Pts: Chivata 14; Rebs: Morales 7 Asts: Ulloa 4 |

Falcon Club Arena, Minsk
Attendance: 50
Referees: Joenard Garcia (PHI), Imran Baig (IND), Ivana Ivanović (SRB)

28 July 2018
13:00

Boxscore

| Argentina | 61–58 | Belarus |
Scoring by quarter: 6–18, 16–14, 20–11, 19–15
| Pts: Acevedo 28; Rebs: Gentinetta 10; Asts: Chagas 4 | | Pts: Venskaya 15; Rebs: Siamiletnikava 7 Asts: Samailiuk, Venskaya 3 |

Minsk Sports Palace, Minsk
Attendance: 150
Referees: Andris Aunkrogers (LAT), Yuji Hirahara (JPN), Hortencia Sánchez (MEX)

==== 15th place game ====
29 July 2018
13:00

Boxscore

| Belarus | 70–58 | Angola |
Scoring by quarter: 19–12, 14–26, 19–6, 18–14
| Pts: Vasilevich 18; Rebs: Siamiletnikava 9 Asts: Vasilevich 8 | | Pts: Antonio 14; Rebs: Antonio, Dizeko 9 Asts: Dizeko 5 |

Minsk Sports Palace, Minsk
Attendance: 150
Referees: Ivor Matějek (CZE), Sara El-Sharnouby (EGY), Opeyemi Ogunleye (NGA)

==== 13th place game ====
29 July 2018
11:00

Boxscore

| Argentina | 51–47 | Colombia |
Scoring by quarter: 10–8, 6–14, 18–9, 17–16
| Pts: Chagas 13; Rebs: Chagas 13; Asts: Chagas, Fontana 4 | | Pts: Chivata 12; Rebs: Chivata 6 Asts: Ayala 3 |

Falcon Club Arena, Minsk
Attendance: 60
Referees: Alejandro Sánchez (URU), Joenard Garcia (PHI), Christian Wilmore (BAH)

==== 9–12th place semifinals ====
28 July 2018
15:30

Boxscore

| Mali | 66–64 (OT) | New Zealand |
Scoring by quarter: 17–19, 11–17, 4–10, 25–11, Overtime: 9–7
| Pts: S. Koné 21; Rebs: S. Koné 15; Asts: F. Koné, Sissoko 6 | | Pts: Leger-Walker 25; Rebs: Leger-Walker 11; Asts: Leger-Walker 7 |

Falcon Club Arena, Minsk
Attendance: 50
Referees: Zdenko Tomašovič (SVK), Amr Aboollo (EGY), Opeyemi Ogunleye (NGA)

28 July 2018
17:45

Boxscore

| China | 59–74 | Canada |
Scoring by quarter: 14–12, 7–18, 11–16, 27–28
| Pts: Liu 26; Rebs: Wu 7 Asts: Wang, Wu 6 | | Pts: Masikewich, Russell 12; Rebs: Masikewich 8 Asts: Te-Biasu 7 |

Falcon Club Arena, Minsk
Attendance: 80
Referees: Vasiliki Tsaroucha (GRE), Sadegh Ghanbaridamanab (IRN), Christian Wilmore (BAH)

==== Eleventh place game ====
29 July 2018
15:30

Boxscore

| New Zealand | 66–88 | China |
Scoring by quarter: 11–17, 15–28, 17–14, 23–29
| Pts: Leger-Walker 23; Rebs: Leger-Walker 11; Asts: three players 3 | | Pts: Sui 19; Rebs: Jiyuan 8 Asts: Zheng 6 |

Falcon Club Arena, Minsk
Attendance: 110
Referees: Yuji Hirahara (JPN), Sadegh Ghanbaridamanab (IRN), Sarty Nghixulifwa (NAM)

==== Ninth place game ====
29 July 2018
17:45

Boxscore

| Mali | 50–58 | Canada |
Scoring by quarter: 12–15, 14–18, 13–12, 11–13
| Pts: S. Koné 22; Rebs: S. Koné 16; Asts: F. Koné 5 | | Pts: Ejim 12; Rebs: Masikewich 7 Asts: Wilson 6 |

Falcon Club Arena, Minsk
Attendance: 50
Referees: Virginia Peruchini (ARG), Yuen Chun Yip (HKG), Imran (IND)

=== Quarterfinals ===
27 July 2018
16:30

Boxscore

| Italy | 46–64 | Australia |
Scoring by quarter: 14–21, 14–13, 9–10, 9–20
| Pts: Panzera 14; Rebs: three players 6 Asts: Panzera 7 | | Pts: Heal 19; Rebs: Emma-Nnopu 11; Asts: three players 3 |

Falcon Club Arena, Minsk
Attendance: 250
Referees: Michał Proc (POL), Hortencia Sánchez (MEX), Ryan Jones (NZL)

27 July 2018
18:00

Boxscore

| France | 67–43 | Latvia |
Scoring by quarter: 16–6, 23–8, 11–20, 17–9
| Pts: Rupert 12; Rebs: Rupert 8 Asts: Fauthoux 5 | | Pts: Loceniece 12; Rebs: Meldere 10; Asts: Nulle 3 |

Minsk Sports Palace, Minsk
Attendance: 150
Referees: Gina Cross(USA), Yuen Chun Yip (HKG), Virginia Peruchini (ARG)

27 July 2018
18:45

Boxscore

| United States | 66–31 | Spain |
Scoring by quarter: 17–8, 17–10, 18–4, 14–9
| Pts: Cooke 14; Rebs: Boston 9 Asts: Horston 4 | | Pts: Carbonell, Méndez 6 Rebs: Méndez 6 Asts: Galve, Méndez 2 |

Falcon Club Arena, Minsk
Attendance: 500
Referees: Andris Aunkrogers (LAT), Yevgeniy Mikheyev (KAZ), Andrada Csender (ROU)

27 July 2018
20:30

Boxscore

| Japan | 62–74 | Hungary |
Scoring by quarter: 16–17, 18–11, 11–23, 17–23
| Pts: Takahashi 13; Rebs: McArthur 9 Asts: Fujita 7 | | Pts: Angyal 18; Rebs: Tóth 10; Asts: Angyal, Kiss 3 |

Minsk Sports Palace, Minsk
Attendance: 150
Referees: Vasiliki Tsaroucha (GRE), Ahmed Al-Shuwaili (IRQ), Zdenko Tomašovič (SVK)

=== 5–8th classification playoffs ===
Classification semifinals
28 July
Latvia | 49
Italy | 86
28 July
Japan | 68
Spain | 69

Fifth place match
29 July
Italy | 65
Spain | 58
Seventh place match
29 July
Latvia | 57
Japan | 75

==== 5–8th place semifinals ====
28 July 2018
13:15

Boxscore

| Latvia | 49–86 | Italy |
Scoring by quarter: 4–31, 15–17, 19–21, 11–17
| Pts: Vihmane 9 Rebs: Mikelsone 8 Asts: Kļeščova 2 | | Pts: Mattera, Panzera 13; Rebs: Mattera, Pastrello 7 Asts: Orsili 5 |

Falcon Club Arena, Minsk
Attendance: 50
Referees: Michał Proc (POL), Yuen Chun Yip (HKG), Ahmed Al-Shuwaili (IRQ)

28 July 2018
14:55

Boxscore

| Japan | 68–69 | Spain |
Scoring by quarter: 17–21, 15–14, 25–13, 11–21
| Pts: Hayashi 17; Rebs: McArthur 5 Asts: Fujita 4 | | Pts: Carrera 15; Rebs: Carrera 13; Asts: Puiggros 4 |

Minsk Sports Palace, Minsk
Referees: Gina Cross (USA), Andrada Csender (ROU), Sarty Nghixulifwa (NAM)

==== Seventh place game ====
29 July 2018
13:15

Boxscore

| Latvia | 57–75 | Japan |
Scoring by quarter: 14–21, 11–24, 15–12, 17–18
| Pts: Meldere 15; Rebs: Meldere 18; Asts: Nulle 4 | | Pts: Hayashi 18; Rebs: Takahashi 9 Asts: Fujita 5 |

Falcon Club Arena, Minsk
Attendance: 40
Referees: Zdenko Tomašovič (SVK), Ahmed Al-Shuwaili (IRQ), Amr Aboollo (EGY)

==== Fifth place game ====
29 July 2018
15:30

Boxscore

| Italy | 65–58 | Spain |
Scoring by quarter: 17–10, 12–14, 19–21, 17–13
| Pts: Natali 17; Rebs: Gilli 14; Asts: Orsili 7 | | Pts: Carrera 19; Rebs: Carrera 8 Asts: Méndez 4 |

Minsk Sports Palace, Minsk
Attendance: 130
Referees: Ryan Jones (NZL), Andrei Sharapa (BLR), Andrada Csender (ROU)

=== Semifinals ===
28 July 2018
18:00

Boxscore

| France | 68–58 | Australia |
Scoring by quarter: 11–19, 10–17, 22–5, 25–17
| Pts: Rupert 20; Rebs: Rupert 14; Asts: Ewodo 6 | | Pts: Palmer 17; Rebs: Emma-Nnopu, Heal 8 Asts: Heal 5 |

Minsk Sports Palace, Minsk
Attendance: 700
Referees: Alejandro Sánchez (URU), Yevgeniy Mikheyev (KAZ), Ivor Matějek (CZE)

28 July 2018
20:30

Boxscore

| Hungary | 39–84 | United States |
Scoring by quarter: 10–30, 12–15, 7–25, 10–14
| Pts: Dombai 10; Rebs: Tóth, Vári 6 Asts: five players 2 | | Pts: Horston 18; Rebs: Brink 7 Asts: Jones 6 |

Minsk Sports Palace, Minsk
Attendance: 1,500
Referees: Andrei Sharapa (BLR), Virginia Peruchini (ARG), Ryan Jones (NZL)

=== Third place game ===
29 July 2018
18:00

Boxscore

| Australia | 57–51 | Hungary |
Scoring by quarter: 12–11, 7–6, 12–20, 26–14
| Pts: Heal 16; Rebs: Emma-Nnopu 9 Asts: Emma-Nnopu 5 | | Pts: Angyal 16; Rebs: Varga 9 Asts: Kovács 4 |

Minsk Sports Palace, Minsk
Attendance: 500
Referees: Gina Cross (USA), Andris Aunkrogers (LAT), Yevgeniy Mikheyev (KAZ)

=== Final ===
29 July 2018
20:30

Boxscore

| France | 40–92 | United States |
Scoring by quarter: 12–23, 16–23, 7–24, 5–22
| Pts: Wadoux 16; Rebs: three players 5 Asts: Fathoux, Pardon 2 | | Pts: Boston 16; Rebs: Horston 9 Asts: Bueckers 10 |

Minsk Sports Palace, Minsk
Attendance: 2,500
Referees: Vasiliki Tsaroucha (GRE), Hortencia Sánchez (MEX), Michał Proc (POL)

== Final standings ==
| Rank | Team | Record |
|---|---|---|
| Gold medal | United States | 7–0 |
| Silver medal | France | 6–1 |
| Bronze medal | Australia | 6–1 |
| 4th | Hungary | 5–2 |
| 5th | Italy | 5–2 |
| 6th | Spain | 3–4 |
| 7th | Japan | 4–3 |
| 8th | Latvia | 2–5 |
| 9th | Canada | 5–2 |
| 10th | Mali | 2–5 |
| 11th | China | 3–4 |
| 12th | New Zealand | 1–6 |
| 13th | Argentina | 4–3 |
| 14th | Colombia | 1–6 |
| 15th | Belarus | 2–5 |
| 16th | Angola | 0–7 |

== Statistics and awards ==
=== Statistical leaders ===
Points

| Name | PPG |
|---|---|
| (Mali) Sika Koné | 16.9 |
| (Australia) Shyla Heal | 16.0 |
| (Argentina) Sofía Acevedo | 15.7 |
| (New Zealand) Charlisse Leger-Walker | 15.1 |
| (China) Liu Yutong | 14.4 |

Rebounds

| Name | RPG |
|---|---|
| (Mali) Aminata Sangare | 13.1 |
| (Mali) Sika Koné | 10.9 |
| (Latvia) Laura Meldere | 10.6 |
| (New Zealand) Jazzmyne Kailahi-Fulu | 9.0 |
| (France) Iliana Rupert | 8.8 |

Assists

| Name | APG |
|---|---|
| (Argentina) Florencia Chagas | 6.6 |
| (United States) Jordan Horston | 5.1 |
| (Mali) Fanta Koné | 4.9 |
| (United States) Paige Bueckers | 4.7 |
| (Japan) Nodoka Fujita | 4.7 |
| (Belarus) Yuliya Vasilevich | 4.7 |

Blocks

| Name | BPG |
|---|---|
| (France) Kendra Chéry | 2.4 |
| (France) Iliana Rupert | 2.3 |
| (Hungary) Réka Mányoky | 2.0 |
| (China) Liu Yutong | 1.4 |
| (Canada) Faith Dut | 1.4 |

Steals

| Name | SPG |
|---|---|
| (United States) Jordan Horston | 3.4 |
| (Belarus) Iryna Venskaya | 3.0 |
| (Italy) Alessandra Orsili | 2.9 |
| (Spain) Raquel Carrera | 2.7 |
| (Mali) Fanta Koné | 2.7 |
| (Mali) Aminata Sangare | 2.7 |
| (China) Yang Shuyu | 2.7 |

=== Awards ===
2018 FIBA Under-17 Women's Basketball World Cup winner

United States
4th title

Most Valuable Player

- (United States) Jordan Horston

All-Tournament Team

- (United States) Jordan Horston
- (United States) Haley Jones
- (United States) Aliyah Boston
- (Australia) Shyla Heal
- (France) Iliana Rupert
