= FIBA U16 Women's AmeriCup =

Under-16 basketball championship

- Most recent season or competition: 2025 FIBA U16 Women's AmeriCup
- Formerly: FIBA Under-16 Women's Americas Championship
- Sport: Basketball
- Founded: 2009; 17 years ago
- Organizing body: FIBA Americas
- No. of teams: 8
- Continent: Americas
- Most recent champions: United States (8th title)
- Most titles: United States (8 titles)
- Qualification: FIBA Under-17 Women's Basketball World Cup
- Related competitions: FIBA U18 Women's AmeriCup
- Website: www.fiba.basketball/history

The FIBA U16 Women's AmeriCup, previously known as the FIBA Under-16 Women's Americas Championship, is the Americas basketball championship for women's under-16 national teams that takes place every two years in the FIBA Americas zone. The inaugural edition of this event was held in 2009.

The top four finishers qualify for the FIBA Under-17 Women's Basketball World Cup.

== Qualification ==
USA and Canada participate in the Under-16 Women's AmeriCup without playing qualifiers. The top three teams from the Under-15 Women's Centrobasket along with the top three teams from the Under-15 Women's South American Championship qualify for this event.

== Summary ==
| Year | Host | Final | | | Third place game | | |
| Year | Host | Gold | Score | Silver | Bronze | Score | Fourth place |
|---|---|---|---|---|---|---|---|
| 2009; Details | Mexico (Mexico City) | United States | 103–52 | Canada | Argentina | 64–47 | Brazil |
| 2011; Details | Mexico (Mérida) | United States | 73–40 | Brazil | Canada | 53–36 | Puerto Rico |
| 2013; Details | Mexico (Cancún) | United States | 82–48 | Canada | Brazil | 70–56 | Mexico |
| 2015; Details | Mexico (Puebla) | Canada | 72–71 (OT) | Brazil | United States | 81–24 | Mexico |
| 2017; Details | Argentina (Buenos Aires) | United States | 91–46 | Canada | Argentina | 59–52 (OT) | Colombia |
| 2019; Details | Chile (Puerto Aysén) | United States | 87–37 | Canada | Chile | 59–49 | Puerto Rico |
| 2021; Details | Mexico (León) | United States | 118–45 | Canada | Mexico | 72–67 | Argentina |
| 2023; Details | Mexico (Mérida) | United States | 79–59 | Canada | Argentina | 67–58 | Puerto Rico |
| 2025; Details | Mexico (Irapuato) | United States | 85–59 | Canada | Mexico | 51–43 | Colombia |
| 2027; Details | TBD (TBD) | | – | | | – | |

== Medal table ==
| Rank | Nation | Gold | Silver | Bronze | Total |
|---|---|---|---|---|---|
| 1 | United States | 8 | 0 | 1 | 9 |
| 2 | Canada | 1 | 7 | 1 | 9 |
| 3 | Brazil | 0 | 2 | 1 | 3 |
| 4 | Argentina | 0 | 0 | 3 | 3 |
| 5 | Mexico | 0 | 0 | 2 | 2 |
| 6 | Chile | 0 | 0 | 1 | 1 |
| Totals (6 entries) | | 9 | 9 | 9 | 27 |

== Participation details ==
| Team | (Mexico); 2009 | (Mexico); 2011 | (Mexico); 2013 | (Mexico); 2015 | (Argentina); 2017 | (Chile); 2019 | (Mexico); 2021 | (Mexico); 2023 | (Mexico); 2025 | 2027 | Total |
| Argentina | 3rd | 5th | 7th | 6th | 3rd | — | 4th | 3rd | 5th | | 8 |
| Brazil | 4th | 2nd | 3rd | 2nd | — | 6th | 6th | 6th | — | | 7 |
| Canada | 2nd | 3rd | 2nd | 1st | 2nd | 2nd | 2nd | 2nd | 2nd | | 9 |
| Chile | — | — | — | — | — | 3rd | 7th | — | — | | 2 |
| Colombia | — | — | — | — | 4th | — | — | 5th | 4th | | 3 |
| Costa Rica | — | — | 8th | — | — | — | 8th | — | — | | 2 |
| Cuba | — | — | — | 5th | — | — | — | — | — | | 1 |
| Dominican Republic | 7th | — | — | — | 8th | — | — | 8th | — | | 3 |
| Ecuador | — | — | — | — | — | 5th | — | — | — | | 1 |
| El Salvador | — | — | — | — | — | 8th | — | — | — | | 1 |
| Guatemala | 8th | 8th | — | — | — | — | — | — | — | | 2 |
| Honduras | — | — | — | 8th | — | — | — | — | — | | 1 |
| Mexico | 5th | 7th | 4th | 4th | 5th | 7th | 3rd | 7th | 3rd | | 9 |
| Panama | — | — | — | — | — | — | — | — | 8th | | 1 |
| Puerto Rico | 6th | 4th | 5th | — | 7th | 4th | 5th | 4th | 7th | | 8 |
| United States | 1st | 1st | 1st | 3rd | 1st | 1st | 1st | 1st | 1st | | 9 |
| Venezuela | — | 6th | 6th | 7th | 6th | — | — | — | 6th | | 5 |

== Under-17 Women's World Cup record ==
| Team | (France); 2010 | (Netherlands); 2012 | (Czech Republic); 2014 | (Spain); 2016 | (Belarus); 2018 | (Hungary); 2022 | (Mexico); 2024 | (Czech Republic); 2026 | (Indonesia); 2028 | Total |
| Argentina | 9th | — | — | — | 13th | 15th | 16th | — | | 4 |
| Brazil | — | 11th | 9th | 13th | — | — | — | — | | 3 |
| Canada | 11th | 3rd | 6th | 7th | 9th | 4th | 2nd | 4th | | 8 |
| Colombia | — | — | — | — | 14th | — | — | 12th | | 2 |
| Mexico | — | — | 14th | 14th | — | 16th | 15th | 15th | | 5 |
| Puerto Rico | — | — | — | — | — | — | 14th | — | | 1 |
| United States | 1st | 1st | 1st | 3rd | 1st | 1st | 1st | 1st | | 8 |
| Total | 3 | 3 | 4 | 4 | 4 | 4 | 5 | 4 | 4 | |

== See also ==
- FIBA Under-18 Women's AmeriCup
- FIBA Under-16 AmeriCup
- FIBA Under-17 Women's Basketball World Cup
