= Puerto Aysén =

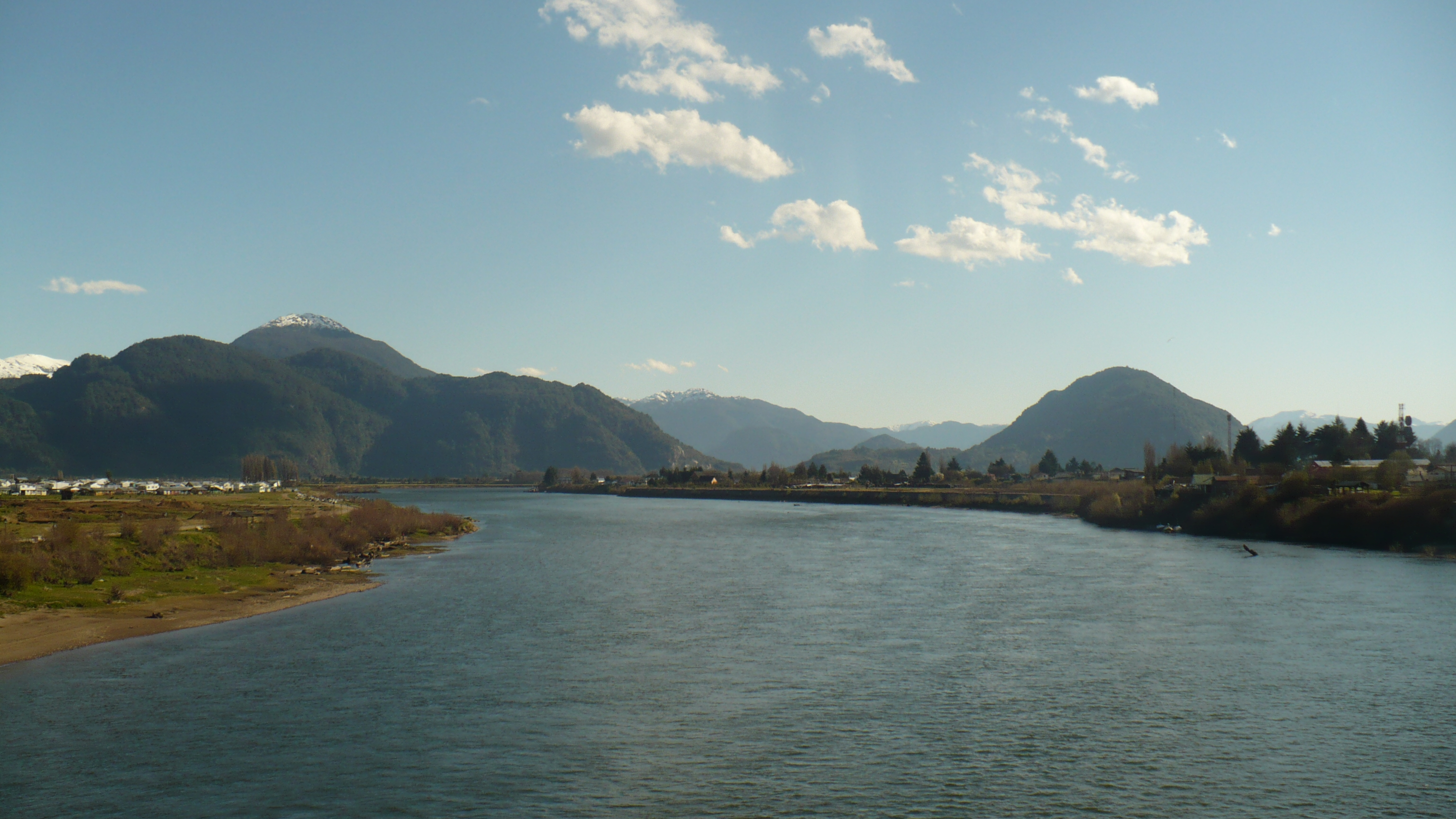
- Puerto Aysén in 2008

- Location of the commune of Aisén in Aysén del General Carlos Ibáñez del Campo Region Location in Chile Puerto Aysén (Chile)
- Coordinates: 45°24′09″S 72°41′24″W
- Region: Aysén
- Province: Aysén
- Municipalidad: Aysén
- Comuna: Aysén

Government
  - Type: Municipalidad
  - Alcalde: Óscar Catalán Sánchez

Population (2017 census )
  - Total: 27,644
- Time zone: UTC−03:00
- Area code: Country + town = 56 + 67
- Climate: Cfb

Puerto Aysén is a city of Chile located in the Aysén del General Carlos Ibáñez del Campo Region, 4 kilometres (2 mi) above the head of Aisén Fjord in the country's extreme south. Puerto Aisén, which is the capital city of both the Aysén Province and the commune of Aisén is located 65 kilometres (40 mi) from the Regional Capital of Coyhaique, and 15 kilometres (9 mi) from the port of Puerto Chacabuco, main entry point to Puerto Aisén by sea. The main tourist attraction is Lagoon San Rafael.

Originally settled around 1914, it was officially recognized as a city on January 28, 1928. It numbers around 27,644 inhabitants (as of the 2017 census).

== Economy ==
Fisheries and tourism are the main economic activities. The port of Chacabuco serves passenger ferries but also cargo traffic: fuel and other necessities are imported while live cattle and other agricultural produce are exported. The city is surrounded by several power plants, both hydro- and thermal powered.

== Climate ==
Puerto Aysén has an oceanic climate (Köppen climate classification: Cfb) with high rainfall throughout the year (and one of Chile's wettest places). Typical of oceanic climates, precipitation peaks in late fall and early winter. The highest temperature recorded is 35.3 °C (95.5 °F) in February 2019 while the lowest is −8.9 °C (16.0 °F) in June 1965.

Climate data for Puerto Aisén (1991–2020, extremes 1955–present)
Month	Jan	Feb	Mar	Apr	May	Jun	Jul	Aug	Sep	Oct	Nov	Dec	Year
Record high °C (°F)	34.9 (94.8)	35.3 (95.5)	31.5 (88.7)	23.6 (74.5)	18.5 (65.3)	15.3 (59.5)	16.6 (61.9)	17.0 (62.6)	23.7 (74.7)	26.0 (78.8)	29.0 (84.2)	31.0 (87.8)	35.3 (95.5)
Mean daily maximum °C (°F)	21.3 (70.3)	19.7 (67.5)	18.5 (65.3)	15.4 (59.7)	12.1 (53.8)	8.4 (47.1)	8.4 (47.1)	10.0 (50.0)	13.6 (56.5)	15.6 (60.1)	17.1 (62.8)	18.8 (65.8)	14.9 (58.8)
Daily mean °C (°F)	14.2 (57.6)	13.9 (57.0)	12.3 (54.1)	9.7 (49.5)	7.2 (45.0)	4.9 (40.8)	4.3 (39.7)	5.8 (42.4)	7.5 (45.5)	9.5 (49.1)	11.3 (52.3)	13.0 (55.4)	9.5 (49.1)
Mean daily minimum °C (°F)	8.1 (46.6)	8.8 (47.8)	6.8 (44.2)	5.0 (41.0)	3.1 (37.6)	1.2 (34.2)	0.4 (32.7)	2.0 (35.6)	2.2 (36.0)	4.7 (40.5)	5.9 (42.6)	7.7 (45.9)	4.7 (40.5)
Record low °C (°F)	1.0 (33.8)	0.6 (33.1)	−2.9 (26.8)	−3.4 (25.9)	−5.8 (21.6)	−8.6 (16.5)	−8.9 (16.0)	−5.4 (22.3)	−7.4 (18.7)	−3.2 (26.2)	−4.0 (24.8)	0.9 (33.6)	−8.9 (16.0)
Average precipitation mm (inches)	160.2 (6.31)	127.7 (5.03)	157.4 (6.20)	178.4 (7.02)	255.5 (10.06)	253.0 (9.96)	224.2 (8.83)	219.2 (8.63)	145.5 (5.73)	173.4 (6.83)	186.8 (7.35)	174.3 (6.86)	2,255.6 (88.80)
Average precipitation days (≥ 1.0 mm)	14.0	12.2	13.7	14.1	15.8	16.7	15.6	16.3	14.2	15.0	15.6	15.4	178.5
Average relative humidity (%)	73	75	77	83	88	88	87	84	80	75	73	73	80
Source 1: Dirección Meteorológica de Chile (humidity 1970–2000)
Source 2: NOAA (precipitation days 1991–2020)

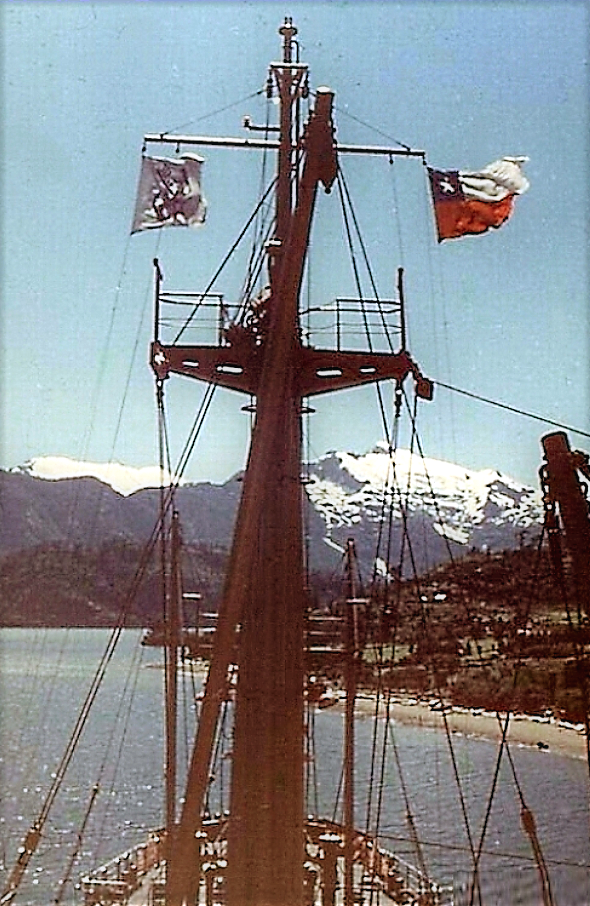
MS LECHSTEIN - 1960
