= 2027 FIBA U16 Women's AmeriCup (Centrobasket qualifiers) =

International youth basketball tournament

Tournament details
- Host country: Panama
- City: Panama City
- Dates: 9–13 December 2026
- Teams: 5 (from 1 sub-confederation)
- Venue: 1 (in 1 host city)

Official website
- www.fiba.basketball

The Central American and Caribbean leg of the 2027 FIBA U16 Women's AmeriCup qualifiers marks the first edition of this competition. The Central American and Caribbean qualifiers replaced the FIBA U15 Women's Centrobasket and, unlike the previous format, they do not include the top Central American and Caribbean teams. Therefore, Mexico and Puerto Rico will not participate in this tournament, having already secured direct qualification for the 2027 FIBA U16 Women's AmeriCup based on the historical ranking.

The tournament will be played at Centro de Alto Rendimiento Luis Carlos "Matador" Tejada Hansell in Panama City, Panama, from 9 to 13 December 2026. In this tournament, U15 teams will compete to qualify for next year's FIBA U16 AmeriCup, with the winning team qualifying directly, while the second berth may be awarded depending on the designation of the host nation for the continental tournament, which will be announced at a later date.

== Participating teams ==
- Costa Rica
- Dominican Republic
- Honduras
- Nicaragua
- Panama

== Tournament format ==
All teams will play a round-robin tournament in a single group. The final standings of the group will also determine the final standings of the tournament.

== Standings ==
Pos	Team	Pld	W	L	PF	PA	PD	Pts	Qualification
1st place, gold medalist(s)	Costa Rica	0	0	0	0	0	0	0	2027 FIBA U16 Women's AmeriCup
2nd place, silver medalist(s)	Dominican Republic	0	0	0	0	0	0	0	Possible 2027 FIBA U16 Women's AmeriCup
3rd place, bronze medalist(s)	Honduras	0	0	0	0	0	0	0	
4	Nicaragua	0	0	0	0	0	0	0	
5	Panama (H)	0	0	0	0	0	0	0	

First match(es) will be played: 9 December 2026. Source: FIBA
(H) Hosts

== Schedule ==
All times are local (Eastern Standard Time; UTC−5).

9 December 2026
18:00

Boxscore

Nicaragua	vs.	Dominican Republic
Scoring by quarter: –, –, –, –

CAR Luis Matador Tejada

9 December 2026
20:30

Boxscore

Panama	vs.	Honduras
Scoring by quarter: –, –, –, –

CAR Luis Matador Tejada

10 December 2026
18:00

Boxscore

Costa Rica	vs.	Honduras
Scoring by quarter: –, –, –, –

CAR Luis Matador Tejada

10 December 2026
20:30

Boxscore

Nicaragua	vs.	Panama
Scoring by quarter: –, –, –, –

CAR Luis Matador Tejada

11 December 2026
18:00

Boxscore

Dominican Republic	vs.	Costa Rica
Scoring by quarter: –, –, –, –

CAR Luis Matador Tejada

11 December 2026
20:30

Boxscore

Honduras	vs.	Nicaragua
Scoring by quarter: –, –, –, –

CAR Luis Matador Tejada

12 December 2026
18:00

Boxscore

Honduras	vs.	Dominican Republic
Scoring by quarter: –, –, –, –

CAR Luis Matador Tejada

12 December 2026
20:30

Boxscore

Panama	vs.	Costa Rica
Scoring by quarter: –, –, –, –

CAR Luis Matador Tejada

13 December 2026
18:00

Boxscore

Costa Rica	vs.	Nicaragua
Scoring by quarter: –, –, –, –

CAR Luis Matador Tejada

13 December 2026
20:30

Boxscore

Dominican Republic	vs.	Panama
Scoring by quarter: –, –, –, –

CAR Luis Matador Tejada
