= 2016 FIBA Under-17 World Championship for Women =

Tournament details
- Host country: Spain
- City: Zaragoza
- Dates: 22 June – 2 July
- Teams: 16 (from 5 confederations)
- Venues: 2 (in 1 host city)

Final positions
- Champions: Australia (1st title)

Tournament statistics
- MVP: (Australia) Eziyoda Magbegor
- Top scorer: (South Korea) Park Ji-hyun (16.5)
- Top rebounds: (Canada) Laeticia Amihere (13.0)
- Top assists: (United States) Destanni Henderson (5.0)
- PPG (Team): Australia (72.8)
- RPG (Team): United States (59.9)
- APG (Team): Australia (17.0)

Official website
- www.fiba.basketball

The 2016 FIBA Under-17 World Championship for Women (Spanish:Campeonato Mundial FIBA Sub-17 Femenino 2016) was an international basketball competition that was held in Zaragoza, Spain from 22 June 22 to 2 July 2016. It was the fourth edition of the FIBA Under-17 World Championship for Women. Sixteen national teams competed in the tournament.

Australia won its first gold medal in this event by beating Italy, 62–38. In the semifinals, Australia beat the United States 73–60, handing the Americans their first ever loss in the history of the Under-17 World Championships. The United States would go on to win bronze.

== Teams ==
Sixteen teams have qualified for this year's edition.

- 2015 FIBA Africa Under-16 Championship for Women
  - Mali
  - Nigeria
- 2015 FIBA Asia Under-16 Championship for Women
  - China
  - Japan
  - South Korea
- 2015 FIBA Americas Under-16 Championship for Women
  - Canada
  - Brazil
  - United States
  - Mexico
- 2015 FIBA Europe Under-16 Championship for Women
  - Czech Republic
  - Portugal
  - Italy
  - Latvia
  - France
- 2015 FIBA Oceania Under-16 Championship for Women
  - Australia
- Host country
  - Spain
    - Spain finished fourth at the 2015 FIBA Europe Under-16 Championship for Women. By virtue of hosting this year's FIBA Under-17 World Championship for Women, their European slot was given to the sixth-placed team, France.

== Preliminary round ==
The draw was held on 13 April 2016.

All times are local (UTC+2).

=== Group A ===
Pos	Team	Pld	W	L	PF	PA	PD	Pts
1	Canada	2	2	0	130	112	+18	4
2	Japan	2	1	1	132	141	−9	3
3	Latvia	2	0	2	128	137	−9	2
4	Nigeria (Note: Nigeria was unable to travel and therefore, their results are voted as a forfeit.) (D)	0	0	0	0	0	0	0

Source: FIBA
Rules for classification: 1) Points; 2) Head-to-head results; 3) Points difference; 4) Points scored.
(D) Disqualified
Notes:

22 June 2016
14:15

Boxscore

Latvia	71–77	Japan
Scoring by quarter: 19–20, 16–28, 22–14, 14–15
Pts: Gulbe 13; Rebs: Lipe 11; Asts: Šepte 3		Pts: Yamamoto 30; Rebs: H. Takahara 12; Asts: three players 3

C.D.M. Siglo XXI, Zaragoza
Referees: Tiffany Bird (USA), Abdelaziz Abassi (TUN), Igor Mitrovski (MKD)

23 June 2016
16:30

Boxscore

Canada	60–57 (OT)	Latvia
Scoring by quarter: 15–11, 8–17, 14–11, 13–11, Overtime: 10–7
Pts: Amihere 18; Rebs: Amihere 21; Asts: five players 1		Pts: Mote 16; Rebs: Gulbe, Rozentāle 9 Asts: three players 2

C.D.M. Siglo XXI, Zaragoza
Referees: Sebastián Negron (CHI), Ricardo Hayles (JAM), Didier Shema-Maboko (RWA)

25 June 2016
09:45

Boxscore

Japan	55–70	Canada
Scoring by quarter: 17–17, 10–17, 10–19, 18–17
Pts: H. Takahara 12; Rebs: Mima 13; Asts: Yamamoto 4		Pts: Amihere 20; Rebs: Amihere 16; Asts: Donovan 4

C.D.M. Siglo XXI, Zaragoza
Referees: Susana Gómez (ESP), Andrada Csender (ROU), Jelena Tomić (CRO)

=== Group B ===
Pos	Team	Pld	W	L	PF	PA	PD	Pts
1	Australia	3	3	0	219	127	+92	6
2	China	3	2	1	179	153	+26	5
3	France	3	1	2	157	138	+19	4
4	Mexico	3	0	3	108	245	−137	3

Source: FIBA
Rules for classification: 1) Points; 2) Head-to-head results; 3) Points difference; 4) Points scored.

22 June 2016
13:45

Boxscore

Australia	98–38	Mexico
Scoring by quarter: 19–8, 26–7, 27–15, 26–8
Pts: Conti 14; Rebs: Magbegor 8 Asts: Conti 6		Pts: Ruiz 9 Rebs: Cano 8 Asts: Canseco 3

Palacio de los Deportes, Utebo
Referees: Ingus Baumanis (LAT), Alexey Davydov (RUS), Babacar Guèye (SEN)

22 June 2016
16:00

Boxscore

France	44–56	China
Scoring by quarter: 7–6, 17–14, 5–21, 15–15
Pts: Sissoko 12; Rebs: Sissoko 7 Asts: Bretagne 5		Pts: Han 17; Rebs: Han 8 Asts: Li 6

Palacio de los Deportes, Utebo
Referees: Daniel García (VEN), Andrada Csender (ROU), Ricardo Hayles (JAM)

23 June 2016
13:45

Boxscore

Mexico	27–65	France
Scoring by quarter: 4–16, 3–14, 6–23, 14–12
Pts: Cano 7 Rebs: Ayala 8 Asts: Landín 2		Pts: Pouye 12; Rebs: Fofana 10; Asts: Bretagne 4

Palacio de los Deportes, Utebo
Referees: Pavel Fuska (SVK), Viola Györgyi (NOR), Alice Lei (MAC)

23 June 2016
14:15

Boxscore

China	41–66	Australia
Scoring by quarter: 5–21, 6–17, 18–15, 12–13
Pts: Wang J. 18; Rebs: Han 8 Asts: Wang J. 3		Pts: Simons 16; Rebs: Magbegor, Shelley 8 Asts: Cubillo, Simmons 3

C.D.M. Siglo XXI, Zaragoza
Referees: Igor Mitrovski (MKD), Andrada Csender (ROU), Jelena Tomić (CRO)

25 June 2016
12:00

Boxscore

Australia	55–48	France
Scoring by quarter: 15–10, 12–12, 14–8, 14–18
Pts: Simmons 13; Rebs: Simmons 9 Asts: Simmons 5		Pts: three players 9 Rebs: Fofana 8 Asts: Bretagne 3

C.D.M. Siglo XXI, Zaragoza
Referees: Tomislav Hordov (CRO), Tiffany Bird (USA), José Fernández

25 June 2016
12:00

Boxscore

China	82–43	Mexico
Scoring by quarter: 23–10, 13–14, 29–12, 17–7
Pts: Han 18; Rebs: Han 9 Asts: Wang J. 7		Pts: Payan 12; Rebs: Ayala 11; Asts: three players 2

Palacio de los Deportes, Utebo
Referees: Ivor Matějek (CZE), Hong Sun-hee (KOR), Chun Yip Yuen (HKG)

=== Group C ===
Pos	Team	Pld	W	L	PF	PA	PD	Pts
1	United States	3	3	0	235	163	+72	6
2	Italy	3	2	1	192	183	+9	5
3	Czech Republic	3	1	2	212	185	+27	4
4	South Korea	3	0	3	166	274	−108	3

Source: FIBA
Rules for classification: 1) Points; 2) Head-to-head results; 3) Points difference; 4) Points scored.

22 June 2016
18:15

Boxscore

Italy	59–57	Czech Republic
Scoring by quarter: 15–10, 11–16, 20–13, 13–18
Pts: Fassina 16; Rebs: Madera 10; Asts: Pinzan 5		Pts: Smutná 19; Rebs: Brabencová 8 Asts: Pospíšilová, Sotolová 4

Palacio de los Deportes, Utebo
Referees: Omar Bermúdez (MEX), Sarah Carey (AUS), Gonzalo Salgueiro (URU)

22 June 2016
20:30

Boxscore

United States	104–45	South Korea
Scoring by quarter: 28–14, 23–7, 26–10, 27–14
Pts: Collier 22; Rebs: De Costa 17; Asts: Henderson 10		Pts: Park J. 17; Rebs: Park J. 10; Asts: Lim 3

Palacio de los Depores, Utebo
Referees: Susana Gómez (ESP), James Boyer (AUS), Nicolas Fernandes (TAH)

24 June 2016
13:45

Boxscore

South Korea	67–78	Italy
Scoring by quarter: 19–22, 15–20, 15–17, 18–19
Pts: Park J. 20; Rebs: Park J. 9 Asts: Park J. 5		Pts: Vella 18; Rebs: Fassina 10; Asts: Vella 8

Palacio de los Deportes, Utebo
Referees: Tomislav Hordov (CRO), Babacar Guèye (SEN), Alice Lei (MAC)

24 June 2016
14:15

Boxscore

Czech Republic	63–72	United States
Scoring by quarter: 12–20, 11–13, 23–20, 17–19
Pts: Smutná 14; Rebs: Šípová 6 Asts: Pospíšilová 4		Pts: Nelson-Ododa 13; Rebs: De Costa 16; Asts: Henderson, Nelson-Ododa 4

C.D.M. Siglo XXI, Zaragoza
Referees: Fabiano Huber (BRA), Alexey Davydov (RUS), Yener Yılmaz (TUR)

25 June 2016
21:00

Boxscore

United States	59–55	Italy
Scoring by quarter: 7–9, 21–21, 13–10, 18–15
Pts: Williams 20; Rebs: Nelson-Ododa 16; Asts: Henderson 3		Pts: Pinzan 16; Rebs: Cubaj 7 Asts: Pinzan 4

C.D.M. Siglo XXI, Zaragoza
Referees: Gonzalo Salgueiro (URU), Sarah Carey (AUS), Didier Shema-Maboko (RWA)

25 June 2016
21:00

Boxscore

Czech Republic	92–54	South Korea
Scoring by quarter: 24–16, 14–11, 22–9, 32–18
Pts: Vitulová 20; Rebs: Sotolová, Vitulová 8 Asts: Pospíšilová, Voráčková 5		Pts: Park J. 20; Rebs: Park J. 7 Asts: Park J. 3

Palacio de los Deportes, Utebo
Referees: Aare Halliko (EST), Mehdi Difallah (FRA), Juan Fernández (ARG)

=== Group D ===
Pos	Team	Pld	W	L	PF	PA	PD	Pts
1	Spain	3	3	0	206	172	+34	6
2	Portugal	3	1	2	161	165	−4	4 (Note: Portugal 3 Pts, +4 PD; Mali 3 Pts, −1 PD; Brazil 3 Pts, −3 PD)
3	Mali	3	1	2	188	203	−15	4
4	Brazil	3	1	2	186	201	−15	4

Source: FIBA
Rules for classification: 1) Points; 2) Head-to-head results; 3) Points difference; 4) Points scored.
Notes:

22 June 2016
16:30

Boxscore

Spain	59–51	Portugal
Scoring by quarter: 12–14, 16–13, 13–12, 18–12
Pts: Ayuso 14; Rebs: Galerón 11; Asts: Rodríguez 5		Pts: Ramos 27; Rebs: Jordão 13; Asts: Jordão, Ramos 3

C.D.M. Siglo XXI, Zaragoza
Referees: Yener Yılmaz (TUR), Takaki Kato (JPN), Jelena Tomić (CRO)

22 June 2016
21:00

Boxscore

Brazil	70–77	Mali
Scoring by quarter: 14–16, 15–24, 20–16, 21–21
Pts: Da Silva 18; Rebs: Da Silva 12; Asts: Nicoletti 4		Pts: Kourouma 24; Rebs: Kourouma 13; Asts: M. Traoré 3

C.D.M. Siglo XXI, Zaragoza
Referees: Pavel Fuska (SVK), Viola Györgyi (NOR), Chun Yip Yuen (HKG)

24 June 2016
18:15

Boxscore

Portugal	54–58	Brazil
Scoring by quarter: 22–8, 8–20, 6–13, 18–17
Pts: Chermiti 18; Rebs: three players 6 Asts: Ramos 5		Pts: Nicoletti 24; Rebs: Nicoletti 14; Asts: Nicoletti 4

Palacio de los Deportes, Utebo
Referees: Ivor Matějek (CZE), Hong Sun-hee (KOR), Chun Yip Yuen (HKG)

24 June 2016
18:45

Boxscore

Mali	63–77	Spain
Scoring by quarter: 17–14, 11–21, 20–20, 15–22
Pts: M. Traoré 21; Rebs: Kourouma 13; Asts: N. Traoré 3		Pts: Galerón 21; Rebs: Serrat 10; Asts: Ayuso 5

C.D.M. Siglo XXI, Zaragoza
Referees: Matthew Kallio (CAN), Abdelaziz Abassi (TUN), Amirhossein Safarzadeh (IRN)

25 June 2016
18:45

Boxscore

Spain	70–58	Brazil
Scoring by quarter: 21–22, 17–11, 17–11, 15–14
Pts: Galerón 18; Rebs: Galerón 8 Asts: Ayuso 5		Pts: Nicoletti 16; Rebs: Sousa 6 Asts: Nicoletti 3

Palacio de los Deportes, Utebo
Referees: Babacar Guèye (SEN), Omar Omar Bermúdez (MEX), Amirhossein Safarzadeh (IRN)

25 June 2016
18:45

Boxscore

Mali	48–56	Portugal
Scoring by quarter: 11–12, 14–13, 16–21, 7–10
Pts: Kourouma 13; Rebs: Kourouma 13; Asts: M. Traoré 2		Pts: Chermiti 12; Rebs: Santos, Silva 9 Asts: Ramos 5

C.D.M. Siglo XXI, Zaragoza
Referees: Fabiano Huber (BRA), Ricardo Hayles (JAM), Alice Lei (MAC)

== Final round ==
Round of 16
27 June
Mexico	37
Canada	72
27 June
Italy	58
Mali	55
27 June
China	76
Latvia	46
27 June
Spain	78
South Korea	44
27 June
Japan	52
France	58
27 June
United States	79
Brazil	62
27 June
Czech Republic	49
Portugal	31

Quarterfinals
29 June
Canada	56
Italy	58
29 June
China	55
Spain	51
29 June
France	45
United States	56
29 June
Australia	83
Czech Republic	53

Semifinals
1 July
Italy	62
China	51
1 July
United States	60
Australia	73

Final
2 July
Italy	38
Australia	62
Third place
2 July
China	50
United States	65

=== Round of 16 ===
27 June 2016
13:45

Boxscore

Czech Republic	49–31	Portugal
Scoring by quarter: 11–13, 8–4, 14–10, 16–4
Pts: Pospíšilová 11; Rebs: Brabencová 12; Asts: Voráčková 3		Pts: Jordão 10; Rebs: Jordão 10; Asts: Chermiti 3

Palacio de los Deportes, Utebo
Referees: Sebastián Negron (CHI), Nicolas Fernandes (TAH), Susana Gómez (ESP)

27 June 2016
16:00

Boxscore

Canada	72–37	Mexico
Scoring by quarter: 22–10, 18–10, 18–6, 14–11
Pts: Brown 14; Rebs: Makolo 12; Asts: Hall 5		Pts: Payan 15; Rebs: Ayala 6 Asts: Rangel 3

Palacio de los Deportes, Utebo
Referees: Tomislav Hordov (CRO), Alexey Davydov (RUS), Alice Lei (MAC)

27 June 2016
16:30

Boxscore

Italy	58–55	Mali
Scoring by quarter: 13–18, 14–11, 16–14, 15–12
Pts: Madera 19; Rebs: Madera 12; Asts: Verona 3		Pts: Coulibaly 22; Rebs: three players 5 Asts: Sidibe 4

C.D.M. Siglo XXI, Zaragoza
Referees: Igor Mitrovski (MKD), Andrada Csender (ROU), Hong Sun-hee (KOR)

27 June 2016
18:15

Boxscore

United States	79–62	Brazil
Scoring by quarter: 18–20, 20–12, 25–15, 16–15
Pts: Bailey, Williams 19; Rebs: Williams 10; Asts: Henderson 7		Pts: De Oliveira 12; Rebs: Da Silva 8 Asts: De Oliveira 3

Palacio de los Deportes, Utebo
Referees: Carlos Peruga (ESP), Abdelaziz Abassi (TUN), Babacar Guèye (SEN)

27 June 2016
18:45

Boxscore

Japan	52–58	France
Scoring by quarter: 16–17, 11–16, 7–9, 18–16
Pts: Yamamoto 14; Rebs: H. Takahara 4 Asts: H. Takahara 2		Pts: Sissoko 15; Rebs: Fofana, Gnago 11; Asts: Pouye, Tahane 3

C.D.M. Siglo XXI, Zaragoza
Referees: Ingus Baumanis (LAT), Omar Bermúdez (MEX), Ricardo Hayles (JAM)

27 June 2016
20:30

Boxscore

Latvia	46–76	China
Scoring by quarter: 21–19, 3–22, 10–15, 12–20
Pts: Gulbe 10; Rebs: Meldere 6 Asts: Septe 3		Pts: Wang J. 18; Rebs: Zhang L. 9 Asts: Wang J., Zhang L. 6

Palacio de los Deportes, Utebo
Referees: Mehdi Difallah (FRA), Sarah Carey (AUS), Viola Györgyi (NOR)

27 June 2016
21:00

Boxscore

South Korea	44–78	Spain
Scoring by quarter: 13–18, 16–25, 9–18, 6–17
Pts: Park J. 17; Rebs: Lee S. 8 Asts: four players 1		Pts: Galeron 12; Rebs: Serrat 10; Asts: Ayuso 4

C.D.M. Siglo XXI, Zaragoza
Referees: Gonzalo Salgueiro (URU), Daniel García (VEN), Jelena Tomić (CRO)

=== 9–15th classification ===
9–15th place quarterfinals
28 June
Mexico	51
Mali	73
28 June
Latvia	78
South Korea	71
28 June
Japan	83
Brazil	60

9–12th place semifinals
29 June
Mali	53
Latvia	82
29 June
Japan	71
Portugal	59

Ninth place
1 July
Latvia	67
Japan	72
Eleventh place
1 July
Mali	69
Portugal	47

13–15th place semifinal
29 June
Mexico	60
South Korea	57

13th place
1 July
Mexico	39
Brazil	64

==== 9–15th place quarterfinals ====
28 June 2016
09:45

Boxscore

Mexico	51–73	Mali
Scoring by quarter: 13–17, 14–14, 11–20, 13–22
Pts: Payan 14; Rebs: Cano, Rosas 8 Asts: Canseco 3		Pts: Coulibaly 23; Rebs: Kourouma 13; Asts: Doumbia 6

C.D.M. Siglo XXI, Zaragoza
Referees: Viola Györgyi (NOR), Alexey Davydov (RUS), Chun Yip Yuen (HKG)

28 June 2016
11:30

Boxscore

Japan	83–60	Brazil
Scoring by quarter: 25–14, 22–19, 13–14, 23–13
Pts: Abe 21; Rebs: Mima, Okuyama 10; Asts: Yamamoto 11		Pts: Lopes 17; Rebs: Da Silva 9 Asts: Da Silva, Nicoletti 5

Palacio de los Deportes, Utebo
Referees: Didier Shema-Maboko (RWA), Sarah Carey (AUS), Pavel Fuska (SVK)

28 June 2016
12:00

Boxscore

Latvia	78–71	South Korea
Scoring by quarter: 20–18, 17–21, 15–21, 26–11
Pts: Lipe 24; Rebs: Lipe 11; Asts: Lipe 8		Pts: Lee J. 15; Rebs: Park J. 9 Asts: Park I. 5

C.D.M. Siglo XXI, Zaragoza
Referees: Susana Gómez (ESP), Andrada Csender (ROU), Ricardo Hayles (JAM)

==== 13–15th place semifinal ====
29 June 2016
09:45

Boxscore

Mexico	60–57	South Korea
Scoring by quarter: 13–21, 13–17, 13–11, 21–8
Pts: Ayala 21; Rebs: Ayala 23; Asts: four players 2		Pts: Lee J. 20; Rebs: Lee S. 8 Asts: Lee S. 7

C.D.M. Siglo XXI, Zaragoza
Referees: Ivor Matějek (CZE), Andrada Csender (ROU), Alice Lei (MAC)

==== 13th place game ====
1 July 2016
11:00

Boxscore

Mexico	39–64	Brazil
Scoring by quarter: 16–12, 2–14, 10–13, 11–25
Pts: Ruiz 18; Rebs: Ayala 12; Asts: Canseco 3		Pts: De Oliveira 17; Rebs: Da Silva 12; Asts: Nicoletti 9

C.D.M. Siglo XXI, Zaragoza
Referees: Nicolas Fernandes (TAH), Alexey Davydov (RUS), Babacar Guèye (SEN)

==== 9–12th place semifinals ====
29 June 2016
11:30

Boxscore

Mali	53–82	Latvia
Scoring by quarter: 10–28, 10–11, 15–13, 18–30
Pts: Kourouma 13; Rebs: Sangare 8 Asts: Sangare 2		Pts: Gulbe 19; Rebs: Lipe 13; Asts: Ozola 5

Palacio de los Deportes, Utebo
Referees: Sarah Carey (AUS), Hong Sun-hee (KOR), Amirhossein Safarzadeh (IRN)

29 June 2016
12:00

Boxscore

Japan	71–59	Portugal
Scoring by quarter: 19–21, 15–10, 17–13, 20–14
Pts: Abe 19; Rebs: Okuyama 7 Asts: Abe 7		Pts: Ramos 15; Rebs: Silva 10; Asts: Serranho 4

C.D.M. Siglo XXI, Zaragoza
Referees: Igor Mitrovski (MKD), Babacar Guèye (SEN), Ricardo Hayles (JAM)

==== Eleventh place game ====
1 July 2016
12:15

Boxscore

Mali	69–47	Portugal
Scoring by quarter: 16–12, 20–5, 15–13, 18–17
Pts: Kourouma 19; Rebs: Kourouma 14; Asts: Coulibaly, M. Traoré 3		Pts: Chermiti 9 Rebs: Silva 8 Asts: Ramos 7

Palacio de los Deportes, Utebo
Referees: Jelena Tomić (CRO), Andrada Csender (ROU), Alice Lei (MAC)

==== Ninth place game ====
1 July 2016
14:30

Boxscore

Latvia	67–72	Japan
Scoring by quarter: 26–20, 14–14, 11–20, 16–18
Pts: Gulbe 20; Rebs: Lipe 11; Asts: Ozola 4		Pts: Fujinaga 19; Rebs: Yamamoto 7 Asts: Kabashima, Yamamoto 4

Palacio de los Deportes, Utebo
Referees: Susana Gómez (ESP), Hong Sun-hee (KOR), Ivor Matějek (CZE)

=== Quarterfinals ===
29 June 2016
14:15

Boxscore

Canada	56–58	Italy
Scoring by quarter: 16–16, 12–17, 11–11, 17–14
Pts: Pellington 12; Rebs: Amihere 15; Asts: Pellington 3		Pts: Madera 14; Rebs: Madera 14; Asts: Pinzan, Vella 3

C.D.M. Siglo XXI, Zaragoza
Referees: Tiffany Bird (USA), Omar Bermúdez (MEX), Nicolas Fernandes (TAH)

29 June 2016
16:30

Boxscore

China	55–51	Spain
Scoring by quarter: 16–15, 17–16, 8–13, 14–7
Pts: Han 18; Rebs: Han 18; Asts: Wang J. 9		Pts: Serrat 14; Rebs: Serrat 11; Asts: Rodríguez 4

C.D.M. Siglo XXI, Zaragoza
Referees: Sebastián Negron (CHI), Pavel Fuska (SVK), Jelena Tomić (CRO)

29 June 2016
18:45

Boxscore

Australia	83–53	Czech Republic
Scoring by quarter: 11–12, 20–15, 25–11, 27–15
Pts: Magbegor 20; Rebs: Simmons 15; Asts: Simmons 5		Pts: Brabencová 12; Rebs: Brabencová, Kopecká 4 Asts: Voráčková 3

C.D.M. Siglo XXI, Zaragoza
Referees: Yener Yılmaz (TUR), Viola Györgyi (NOR), Fabiano Huber (BRA)

29 June 2016
21:00

Boxscore

France	45–56	United States
Scoring by quarter: 14–17, 13–11, 11–16, 7–12
Pts: Tahane 13; Rebs: Mbandu 7 Asts: Pouye 3		Pts: Williams 17; Rebs: Bailey 10; Asts: Henderson 4

C.D.M. Siglo XXI, Zaragoza
Referees: Aare Halliko (EST), Susana Gómez (ESP), Takaki Kato (JPN)

=== 5–8th classification ===
5–8th place semifinals
30 June
Canada	72
Spain	75
30 June
Czech Republic	62
France	55

Fifth place
2 July
Spain	51
Czech Republic	63
Seventh place
2 July
Canada	58
France	53

==== 5–8th place semifinals ====
30 June 2016
16:45

Boxscore

Canada	72–75	Spain
Scoring by quarter: 17–21, 22–15, 18–14, 15–25
Pts: Amihere, Jerome 15; Rebs: Amihere 12; Asts: Hall, Pellington 4		Pts: Galerón 17; Rebs: Serrat 10; Asts: Ayuso, González 7

Palacio de los Deportes, Utebo
Referees: Ingus Baumanis (LAT), James Boyer (AUS), Sarah Carey (AUS)

30 June 2016
19:00

Boxscore

France	55–62	Czech Republic
Scoring by quarter: 19–11, 14–12, 13–24, 9–15
Pts: Tahane 16; Rebs: Brochant 7 Asts: Tahane 3		Pts: Voráčková 14; Rebs: three players 5 Asts: Rašková, Sotolová 4

Palacio de los Deportes, Utebo
Referees: Jelena Tomić (CRO), Andrada Csender (ROU), Viola Györgyi (NOR)

==== Seventh place game ====
2 July 2016
13:30

Boxscore

Canada	58–53	France
Scoring by quarter: 14–8, 15–17, 17–11, 12–17
Pts: Shand 12; Rebs: Amihere 8 Asts: four players 2		Pts: Mbaye 10; Rebs: Fofana 7 Asts: Gnago 3

C.D.M. Siglo XXI, Zaragoza
Referees: Ingus Baumanis (LAT), Sarah Carey (AUS), Susana Gómez (ESP)

==== Fifth place game ====
2 July 2016
16:00

Boxscore

Spain	51–63	Czech Republic
Scoring by quarter: 18–15, 15–20, 14–7, 4–21
Pts: Ayuso 14; Rebs: Galerón 8 Asts: González 3		Pts: Smutná 15; Rebs: Vitulová 13; Asts: Smutná, Sotolová 2

C.D.M. Siglo XXI, Zaragoza
Referees: Igor Mitrovski (MKD), Andrada Csender (ROU), Nicolas Fernandes (TAH)

=== Semifinals ===
1 July 2016
13:30

Boxscore

Italy	62–51	China
Scoring by quarter: 9–12, 13–11, 17–12, 18–13
Pts: Madera 21; Rebs: Madera 8 Asts: Pinzan 5		Pts: Han 13; Rebs: Han 15; Asts: Zhang L. 4

C.D.M. Siglo XXI, Zaragoza
Referees: Sebastián Negron (CHI), Daniel García (VEN), Viola Györgyi (NOR)

1 July 2016
16:00

Boxscore

United States	60–73	Australia
Scoring by quarter: 13–16, 14–20, 19–23, 14–14
Pts: Nelson-Ododa 17; Rebs: Dodson 13; Asts: Henderson, Prohaska 3		Pts: Shelley 23; Rebs: Magbegor 10; Asts: Simmons 6

C.D.M. Siglo XXI, Zaragoza
Referees: Yener Yılmaz (TUR), Takaki Kato (JPN), Igor Mitrovski (MKD)

=== Third place game ===
2 July 2016
18:30

Boxscore

China	50–65	United States
Scoring by quarter: 7–11, 11–17, 25–18, 7–19
Pts: Han 16; Rebs: Han 9 Asts: Wang J. 3		Pts: Mikesell 15; Rebs: Bailey 11; Asts: Henderson 4

C.D.M. Siglo XXI, Zaragoza
Referees: Omar Bermúdez (MEX), James Boyer (AUS), Jelena Tomić (CRO)

=== Final ===
2 July 2016
21:00

Boxscore

Italy	38–62	Australia
Scoring by quarter: 9–14, 7–17, 11–16, 11–15
Pts: Verona 13; Rebs: Trucco 6 Asts: Del Poro 2		Pts: Conti 18; Rebs: Simmons 12; Asts: Shelley 5

C.D.M. Siglo XXI, Zaragoza
Referees: Tiffany Bird (USA), Viola Györgyi (NOR), Takaki Kato (JPN)

== Final standings ==
Rank	Team	Record
Gold medal	Australia	6–0
Silver medal	Italy	5–2
Bronze medal	United States	6–1
4th	China	4–3
5th	Czech Republic	4–3
6th	Spain	5–2
7th	Canada	4–2
8th	France	2–5
9th	Japan	4–2
10th	Latvia	2–4
11th	Mali	3–4
12th	Portugal	1–5
13th	Brazil	2–4
14th	Mexico	1–6
15th	South Korea	0–6

== Awards ==
2016 Under-17 World Championship
for Women winner

Australia
1st title

Most Valuable Player
(Australia) Eziyoda Magbegor

All-Tournament Team

- PG – (Australia) Monique Conti
- SG – (Australia) Jasmine Simmons
- SF – (Australia) Eziyoda Magbegor
- PF – (Italy) Sara Madera
- C – (China) Han Xu

== Statistics ==
Points

Name	PPG
(South Korea) Park Ji-hyun	16.5
(Latvia) Aleksa Gulbe	15.7
(Mali) Salimatou Kourouma	15.6
(China) Han Xu	15.0
(China) Wang Jiaqi	13.9

Rebounds

Name	RPG
(Canada) Laeticia Amihere	13.0
(China) Han Xu	10.7
(Mali) Salimatou Kourouma	10.6
(United States) Aquira De Costa	10.1
(Mexico) Patricia Ayala	9.9

Assists

Name	APG
(China) Wang Jiaqi	5.0
(United States) Destanni Henderson	5.0
(Brazil) Izabela Nicoletti	4.2
(Australia) Jasmine Simmons	4.2
(Spain) Aina Ayuso	4.1

Blocks

Name	BPG
(Canada) Laeticia Amihere	3.3
(Australia) Eziyoda Magbegor	2.8
(China) Han Xu	2.6
(United States) Aquira De Costa	2.0
(Portugal) Beatriz Jordão	1.8

Steals

Name	SPG
(China) Wang Jiaqi	3.9
(South Korea) Park Ji-hyun	3.3
(Brazil) Raphaella Da Silva	3.0
(South Korea) Lee So-hee	3.0
(Italy) Sara Madera	2.6
(Mexico) Gabriela Rosas	2.6

Efficiency

Name	EFFPG
(Mali) Salimatou Kourouma	19.9
(Canada) Laeticia Amihere	19.8
(China) Han Xu	19.4
(Australia) Jasmine Simmons	18.0
(Australia) Eziyoda Magbegor	17.3
