= Puerto Rico women's national under-17 basketball team =

Basketball team of Puerto Rico

Puerto Rico
- Joined FIBA: 1957
- FIBA zone: FIBA Americas
- National federation: Puerto Rican Basketball Federation
- Coach: Michelle González
- Nickname: 12 Magníficas

U17 World Cup
- Appearances: 1
- Medals: None

U16 AmeriCup
- Appearances: 8
- Medals: None

U15 Centrobasket
- Appearances: 5
- Medals: (gold) Gold: 1 (2012); (silver) Silver: 2 (2009, 2022); (bronze) Bronze: 1 (2024)
Home	Away

The Puerto Rico women's national under-15, under-16 and under-17 basketball team is a national basketball team of Puerto Rico, administered by the Puerto Rican Basketball Federation (Spanish: Federación de Baloncesto de Puerto Rico), abbreviated as FBPUR. It represents the country in international under-15, under-16 and under-17 women's basketball competitions.

== FIBA U15 Women's Centrobasket participations ==
Year	Result
2009	2nd place, silver medalist(s)
2012	1st place, gold medalist(s)
2014	4th
2022	2nd place, silver medalist(s)
2024	3rd place, bronze medalist(s)

== FIBA Under-16 Women's AmeriCup participations ==
Year	Result
2009	6th
2011	4th
2013	5th
2017	7th
2019	4th
2021	5th
2023	4th
2025	7th

== FIBA U17 World Cup record ==
Year	Pos.	Pld	W	L
(France) 2010	Did not qualify			
(Netherlands) 2012	Did not qualify			
(Czech Republic) 2014	Did not qualify			
(Spain) 2016	Did not qualify			
(Belarus) 2018	Did not qualify			
(Hungary) 2022	Did not qualify			
(Mexico) 2024	14th	7	1	6
(Czech Republic) 2026	Did not qualify			
Total	1/8	7	1	6

== See also ==
- Puerto Rico women's national basketball team
- Puerto Rico women's national under-19 basketball team
- Puerto Rico men's national under-17 basketball team
