= 2023 FIBA Under-16 Women's Americas Championship =

International basketball tournament

8th FIBA Under-16 Women's Americas Basketball Championship

Tournament details
- Host country: Mexico
- City: Mérida
- Dates: 13–19 June
- Teams: 8 (from 1 confederation)
- Venue: 1 (in 1 host city)

Final positions
- Champions: United States (7th title)
- Runners-up: Canada
- Third place: Argentina

Tournament statistics
- MVP: (United States) Jerzy Robinson

Official website
- www.fiba.basketball/history

The 2023 FIBA Under-16 Women's Americas Championship was an international basketball competition held in Mérida, Yucatán, Mexico, from 13 to 19 June 2023. It was the eighth edition of the FIBA Under-16 Women's Americas Championship. The top four teams qualified for the 2024 FIBA Under-17 Women's Basketball World Cup in Mexico.

The United States won their seventh title, after defeating Canada in the final, 79–59.

== Participating teams ==
- North America:
1. United States
2. Canada
- Central America and the Caribbean: (2022 FIBA U15 Women's Centrobasket in Gurabo, Puerto Rico, 26–30 June 2022)
1. Mexico (Hosts)
2. Puerto Rico
3. Dominican Republic
- South America: (2022 FIBA U15 Women's South American Championship in Santiago, Chile, 23–27 November 2022)
1. Argentina
2. Colombia
3. Brazil

== Group phase ==
In this round, the teams were drawn into two groups of four. All teams advanced to the playoffs.

All times are local (Time in Mexico – UTC-6).

=== Group A ===
Pos	Team	Pld	W	L	PF	PA	PD	Pts
1	United States	3	3	0	340	95	+245	6
2	Puerto Rico	3	2	1	184	262	−78	5
3	Colombia	3	1	2	158	219	−61	4
4	Mexico (H)	3	0	3	162	268	−106	3

Source: FIBA
(H) Hosts

13 June 2023
17:30

Boxscore

United States	124–39	Puerto Rico
Scoring by quarter: 35–8, 33–10, 30–14, 26–7

Poliforum Zamna, Mérida

13 June 2023
20:00

Boxscore

Mexico	59–67	Colombia
Scoring by quarter: 17–24, 13–21, 16–13, 13–9

Poliforum Zamna, Mérida

14 June 2023
17:30

Boxscore

Colombia	29–93	United States
Scoring by quarter: 8–22, 17–25, 2–25, 2–21

Poliforum Zamna, Mérida

14 June 2023
20:00

Boxscore

Puerto Rico	78–76	Mexico
Scoring by quarter: 22–19, 14–24, 23–19, 19–14

Poliforum Zamna, Mérida

15 June 2023
17:30

Boxscore

Puerto Rico	67–62	Colombia
Scoring by quarter: 20–20, 12–19, 16–9, 19–14

Poliforum Zamna, Mérida

15 June 2023
20:00

Boxscore

Mexico	27–123	United States
Scoring by quarter: 10–30, 7–41, 7–31, 3–21

Poliforum Zamna, Mérida

=== Group B ===
Pos	Team	Pld	W	L	PF	PA	PD	Pts
1	Canada	3	3	0	251	122	+129	6
2	Argentina	3	2	1	187	213	−26	5
3	Brazil	3	1	2	167	201	−34	4
4	Dominican Republic	3	0	3	164	233	−69	3

Source: FIBA

13 June 2023
12:30

Boxscore

Dominican Republic	62–72	Argentina
Scoring by quarter: 12–19, 19–13, 8–15, 23–25

Poliforum Zamna, Mérida

13 June 2023
15:00

Boxscore

Canada	69–37	Brazil
Scoring by quarter: 20–13, 13–12, 23–6, 13–6

Poliforum Zamna, Mérida

14 June 2023
12:30

Boxscore

Canada	90–40	Dominican Republic
Scoring by quarter: 30–12, 23–11, 23–2, 14–15

Poliforum Zamna, Mérida

14 June 2023
15:00

Boxscore

Argentina	70–59	Brazil
Scoring by quarter: 16–14, 25–15, 18–16, 11–14

Poliforum Zamna, Mérida

15 June 2023
12:30

Boxscore

Argentina	45–92	Canada
Scoring by quarter: 19–21, 11–23, 9–30, 6–18

Poliforum Zamna, Mérida

15 June 2023
15:00

Boxscore

Brazil	71–62	Dominican Republic
Scoring by quarter: 25–13, 19–21, 20–9, 7–19

Poliforum Zamna, Mérida

== Playoffs ==
=== Bracket ===
5th place match
Colombia	53
Brazil	41
7th place match
Dominican Republic	61
Mexico	90

5th–8th place semifinals
Dominican Republic	57
Colombia	58
Brazil	66
Mexico	54

Quarterfinals
A1	United States	106
B4	Dominican Republic	34
B2	Argentina	55
A3	Colombia	54
A2	Puerto Rico	57
B3	Brazil	49
B1	Canada	71
A4	Mexico	44

Semifinals
United States	112
Argentina	48
Puerto Rico	49
Canada	77

Final
United States	79
Canada	59
3rd place match
Argentina	67
Puerto Rico	58

=== Quarterfinals ===
17 June 2023
12:30

Boxscore

Puerto Rico	57–49	Brazil
Scoring by quarter: 17–11, 5–17, 12–9, 23–12

Poliforum Zamna, Mérida

17 June 2023
15:00

Boxscore

Argentina	55–54	Colombia
Scoring by quarter: 15–17, 13–15, 13–8, 14–14

Poliforum Zamna, Mérida

17 June 2023
17:30

Boxscore

United States	106–34	Dominican Republic
Scoring by quarter: 25–13, 26–8, 31–5, 24–8

Poliforum Zamna, Mérida

17 June 2023
20:00

Boxscore

Canada	71–44	Mexico
Scoring by quarter: 20–8, 19–10, 21–14, 11–12

Poliforum Zamna, Mérida

=== 5th–8th place semifinals ===
18 June 2023
12:30

Boxscore

Dominican Republic	57–58	Colombia
Scoring by quarter: 15–13, 11–13, 20–18, 11–14

Poliforum Zamna, Mérida

18 June 2023
15:00

Boxscore

Brazil	66–54	Mexico
Scoring by quarter: 14–14, 21–10, 21–16, 10–14

Poliforum Zamna, Mérida

==== 7th place match ====
19 June 2023
12:30

Boxscore

Dominican Republic	61–90	Mexico
Scoring by quarter: 14–16, 20–18, 15–33, 12–23

Poliforum Zamna, Mérida

==== 5th place match ====
19 June 2023
15:00

Boxscore

Colombia	53–41	Brazil
Scoring by quarter: 6–16, 10–6, 23–10, 14–9

Poliforum Zamna, Mérida

=== Semifinals ===
18 June 2023
17:30

Boxscore

United States	112–48	Argentina
Scoring by quarter: 39–17, 26–13, 29–7, 18–11

Poliforum Zamna, Mérida

18 June 2023
20:00

Boxscore

Puerto Rico	49–77	Canada
Scoring by quarter: 17–19, 24–27, 6–18, 2–13

Poliforum Zamna, Mérida

==== 3rd place match ====
19 June 2023
17:30

Boxscore

Argentina	67–58	Puerto Rico
Scoring by quarter: 12–12, 19–19, 16–17, 20–10

Poliforum Zamna, Mérida

==== Final ====
19 June 2023
20:00

Boxscore

United States	79–59	Canada
Scoring by quarter: 19–12, 22–8, 14–17, 24–22

Poliforum Zamna, Mérida

== Final standings ==
Rank	Team	Record
1st place, gold medalist(s)	United States	6–0
2nd place, silver medalist(s)	Canada	5–1
3rd place, bronze medalist(s)	Argentina	4–2
4	Puerto Rico	3–3
5	Colombia	3–3
6	Brazil	2–4
7	Mexico	1–5
8	Dominican Republic	0–6

Qualified for the 2024 FIBA Under-17 Women's Basketball World Cup
Qualified for the 2024 FIBA Under-17 Women's Basketball World Cup as hosts

== Awards ==
2023 FIBA Under-16 Women's Americas Championship champions

United States
Seventh title

- Most Valuable Player:
  - (United States) Jerzy Robinson
- All-Star Five:
  - (United States) Jerzy Robinson
  - (United States) McKenna Woliczko
  - (Argentina) Milagros Morell
  - (Puerto Rico) Desirek Nieves
  - (Canada) Cearah Parchment
