= Guatemala women's national under-15 and under-16 basketball team =

Guatemala
- FIBA zone: FIBA Americas
- National federation: Federación de Baloncesto de Guatemala

U17 World Cup
- Appearances: None

U16 AmeriCup
- Appearances: 2
- Medals: None

U15 Centrobasket
- Appearances: 3
- Medals: None

The Guatemala women's national under-15 and under-16 basketball team is a national basketball team of Guatemala, administered by the Federación de Baloncesto de Guatemala. It represents the country in international under-15 and under-16 women's basketball competitions.

== FIBA U15 Women's Centrobasket participations ==
Year	Result
2009	4th
2012	4th
2014	5th

== FIBA Under-16 Women's AmeriCup participations ==
Year	Result
2009	8th
2011	8th

== See also ==
- Guatemala men's national basketball team
- Guatemala women's national basketball team
- Guatemala women's national under-17 and under-18 basketball team
