= Janelle Bailey =

American basketball player

No. 44, 30 – North Carolina Tar Heels
- Position: Center
- League: Atlantic Coast Conference

Personal information
- Born: May 4, 1999 (age 27)
- Listed height: 6 ft 4 in (1.93 m)

Career information
- High school: Providence Day (Charlotte, North Carolina)
- College: North Carolina (2017–2021)

Career highlights
- First-team All-ACC (2020); ACC Rookie of the Year (2018); ACC All-Freshman Team (2018); USA Basketball Female Athlete of the Year (2017); McDonald's All-American (2017)
- Stats at Basketball Reference
Medals
Women's basketball
Representing the United States
FIBA Under-17 World Cup
Bronze medal – third place	2016 Spain	Team
Women's 3x3 basketball
Representing the United States
FIBA 3x3 Under-18 World Cup
Gold medal – first place	2017 China

Janelle Bailey (born May 4, 1999) is an American women's basketball player. In 2016, she won a bronze medal as the starting center on Team USA at the FIBA Under-17 World Championship for Women. After playing at the University of North Carolina, Bailey went undrafted in the 2021 WNBA draft. On April 24, 2021, she signed a rookie-scale contract with the New York Liberty. However, a week prior to the start of the regular season, Bailey was waived by the team.

== High school ==
Bailey won three state titles and scored more than 1,000 points while attending Providence Day School in Charlotte. In 2017, she was named a McDonald's All-American and USA Basketball Female Athlete of the Year.

== Career statistics ==
Legend
GP	Games played	GS	Games started	MPG	Minutes per game	RPG	Rebounds per game
APG	Assists per game	SPG	Steals per game	BPG	Blocks per game	PPG	Points per game
TO	Turnovers per game	FG%	Field-goal percentage	3P%	3-point field-goal percentage	FT%	Free-throw percentage
**Bold**	Career best	°	League leader

=== College ===
Year	Team	GP	GS	MPG	FG%	3P%	FT%	RPG	APG	SPG	BPG	TO	PPG
2017–18	UNC	31	31	32.3	**48.5**	0.0	68.6	9.1	0.9	0.6	1.2	2.2	15.3
2018–19	UNC	**32**	31	33.1	47.1	26.1	75.2	8.7	1.1	0.7	0.7	1.7	**16.7**
2019–20	UNC	27	27	**32.8**	41.2	**44.4**	**80.7**	**9.3**	**1.9**	**0.8**	1.2	2.8	14.5
2020–21	UNC	24	24	28.7	48.1	13.3	71.1	8.2	1.1	0.7	0.5	1.7	13.6
**Career**		114	113	31.9	46.3	23.5	74.4	8.9	1.2	0.7	0.9	2.1	15.1
Statistics retrieved from Sports-Reference.

== Personal ==
Bailey was born in New York City to Hessard and Kim Bailey. Hessard was born in Jamaica and had experience as an amateur boxer and Kim ran track in high school. At the age of 2, the family moved to Charlotte, North Carolina.
