= Cuba women's national under-15 and under-16 basketball team =

Cuba
- FIBA zone: FIBA Americas
- National federation: Federación Cubana de Baloncesto

U17 World Cup
- Appearances: None

U16 AmeriCup
- Appearances: 1
- Medals: None

U15 Centrobasket
- Appearances: 1
- Medals: (bronze) Bronze: 1 (2014)

The Cuba women's national under-15 and under-16 basketball team is a national basketball team of Cuba, administered by the Federación Cubana de Baloncesto. It represents the country in international under-15 and under-16 women's basketball competitions.

== FIBA U15 Women's Centrobasket participations ==
Year	Result
2014	3rd place, bronze medalist(s)

== FIBA Under-16 Women's AmeriCup participations ==
Year	Result
2015	5th

== See also ==
- Cuba women's national basketball team
- Cuba women's national under-19 basketball team
