= 2022 FIBA U15 Women's Centrobasket =

International youth basketball tournament

Tournament details
- Host country: Puerto Rico
- City: Gurabo
- Dates: 26–30 June 2022
- Teams: 4 (from 1 confederation)
- Venue: 1 (in 1 host city)

Final positions
- Champions: Mexico (3rd title)
- Runners-up: Puerto Rico
- Third place: Dominican Republic

Official website
- www.fiba.basketball/history

The 2022 FIBA U15 Women's Centrobasket was the fourth edition of the Central American and Caribbean basketball championship for women's under-15 national teams. The tournament was played at Coliseo Fernando Rube Hernandez in Gurabo, Puerto Rico, from 26 to 30 June 2022.

== Participating teams ==
- Bahamas
- Dominican Republic
- Mexico
- Puerto Rico

== Tournament format ==
The teams played a round-robin tournament in one group first. Then, all teams advanced to the playoffs.

== Group phase ==
Pos	Team	Pld	W	L	PF	PA	PD	Pts	Qualification
1	Puerto Rico	3	3	0	257	117	+140	6	Semifinals
2	Mexico	3	2	1	266	133	+133	5	Semifinals
3	Dominican Republic	3	1	2	167	225	−58	4	Semifinals
4	Bahamas	3	0	3	84	299	−215	3	Semifinals

Source: FIBA

All times are local (Atlantic Standard Time – UTC-4).

26 June 2022
17:15

Boxscore

Dominican Republic	46–92	Mexico
Scoring by quarter: 10–17, 9–24, 21–20, 6–31

Coliseo Fernando Rube Hernandez, Gurabo

26 June 2022
20:00

Boxscore

Puerto Rico	101–20	Bahamas
Scoring by quarter: 19–3, 30–6, 18–6, 34–5

Coliseo Fernando Rube Hernandez, Gurabo

27 June 2022
17:15

Boxscore

Dominican Republic	79–45	Bahamas
Scoring by quarter: 30–9, 21–13, 17–15, 11–8

Coliseo Fernando Rube Hernandez, Gurabo

27 June 2022
20:00

Boxscore

Mexico	55–68	Puerto Rico
Scoring by quarter: 19–22, 9–13, 13–16, 14–17

Coliseo Fernando Rube Hernandez, Gurabo

28 June 2022
17:15

Boxscore

Bahamas	19–119	Mexico
Scoring by quarter: 6–31, 1–41, 6–22, 6–25

Coliseo Fernando Rube Hernandez, Gurabo

28 June 2022
20:00

Boxscore

Puerto Rico	88–42	Dominican Republic
Scoring by quarter: 32–11, 12–7, 26–11, 18–13

Coliseo Fernando Rube Hernandez, Gurabo

== Playoffs ==
Semifinals
A1	Puerto Rico	83
A4	Bahamas	37
A2	Mexico	77
A3	Dominican Republic	45

Final
A1	Puerto Rico	52
A2	Mexico	56
3rd place match
A3	Dominican Republic	79
A4	Bahamas	39

=== Semifinals ===
29 June 2022
17:15

Boxscore

Mexico	77–45	Dominican Republic
Scoring by quarter: 23–8, 20–17, 18–8, 16–12

Coliseo Fernando Rube Hernandez, Gurabo

29 June 2022
20:00

Boxscore

Puerto Rico	83–37	Bahamas
Scoring by quarter: 17–7, 28–11, 15–3, 23–16

Coliseo Fernando Rube Hernandez, Gurabo

=== 3rd place match ===
30 June 2022
17:15

Boxscore

Dominican Republic	79–39	Bahamas
Scoring by quarter: 16–2, 27–6, 19–11, 17–20

Coliseo Fernando Rube Hernandez, Gurabo

=== Final ===
30 June 2022
20:00

Boxscore

Puerto Rico	52–56	Mexico
Scoring by quarter: 16–17, 6–13, 25–9, 5–17

Coliseo Fernando Rube Hernandez, Gurabo

== Final standings ==
Rank	Team
1st place, gold medalist(s)	Mexico
2nd place, silver medalist(s)	Puerto Rico
3rd place, bronze medalist(s)	Dominican Republic
4	Bahamas

Qualified for the 2023 FIBA Under-16 Women's Americas Championship
