= 2024 FIBA U15 Women's Centrobasket =

International basketball competition

Tournament details
- Host country: Panama
- City: David
- Dates: 24–28 July 2024
- Teams: 8 (from 1 confederation)
- Venue(s): 1 (in 1 host city)

Final positions
- Champions: Mexico (4th title)
- Runners-up: Panama
- Third place: Puerto Rico

Official website
- www.fiba.basketball

The 2024 FIBA U15 Women's Centrobasket was the fifth edition of the Central American and Caribbean basketball championship for women's under-15 national teams. The tournament was played at La Basita in David, Chiriquí, Panama, from 24 to 28 July 2024.

== Participating teams ==
- Bahamas
- Costa Rica
- Dominican Republic
- El Salvador
- Mexico
- Nicaragua
- Panama
- Puerto Rico

== Group phase ==
In this round, the teams were drawn into two groups of four. The first two teams from each group advanced to the semifinals; the third and fourth teams advanced to the 5th–8th place playoffs.

All times are local (Eastern Standard Time (Americas) – UTC-5).

=== Group A ===
| Pos | Team | Pld | W | L | PF | PA | PD | Pts | Qualification |
|---|---|---|---|---|---|---|---|---|---|
| 1 | Mexico | 3 | 3 | 0 | 236 | 88 | +148 | 6 | Semifinals |
| 2 | Panama (H) | 3 | 2 | 1 | 156 | 182 | −26 | 5 | Semifinals |
| 3 | Dominican Republic | 3 | 1 | 2 | 196 | 159 | +37 | 4 | 5th–8th place playoffs |
| 4 | Nicaragua | 3 | 0 | 3 | 86 | 245 | −159 | 3 | 5th–8th place playoffs |

Source: FIBA
(H) Hosts

24 July 2024
20:00

Boxscore

| Panama | 67–61 | Dominican Republic |
Scoring by quarter: –, –, –, –

La Basita, David

24 July 2024
22:00

Boxscore

| Mexico | 91–18 | Nicaragua |
Scoring by quarter: 22–3, 25–3, 24–7, 20–5

La Basita, David

25 July 2024
19:00

Boxscore

| Nicaragua | 39–56 | Panama |
Scoring by quarter: 4–19, 9–13, 14–13, 12–11

La Basita, David

25 July 2024
21:00

Boxscore

| Dominican Republic | 37–63 | Mexico |
Scoring by quarter: 6–10, 8–16, 15–11, 8–26

La Basita, David

26 July 2024
19:00

Boxscore

| Nicaragua | 29–98 | Dominican Republic |
Scoring by quarter: 6–27, 6–22, 10–31, 7–18

La Basita, David

26 July 2024
21:00

Boxscore

| Panama | 33–82 | Mexico |
Scoring by quarter: 11–21, 9–18, 4–12, 9–31

La Basita, David

=== Group B ===
| Pos | Team | Pld | W | L | PF | PA | PD | Pts | Qualification |
|---|---|---|---|---|---|---|---|---|---|
| 1 | Puerto Rico | 3 | 3 | 0 | 187 | 145 | +42 | 6 | Semifinals |
| 2 | El Salvador | 3 | 2 | 1 | 169 | 149 | +20 | 5 | Semifinals |
| 3 | Costa Rica | 3 | 1 | 2 | 176 | 143 | +33 | 4 | 5th–8th place playoffs |
| 4 | Bahamas | 3 | 0 | 3 | 116 | 211 | −95 | 3 | 5th–8th place playoffs |

Source: FIBA

24 July 2024
15:00

Boxscore

| Puerto Rico | 69–51 | El Salvador |
Scoring by quarter: 11–9, 21–13, 28–14, 9–15

La Basita, David

24 July 2024
17:00

Boxscore

| Bahamas | 38–80 | Costa Rica |
Scoring by quarter: 14–16, 8–23, 6–19, 10–22

La Basita, David

25 July 2024
14:00

Boxscore

| El Salvador | 69–37 | Bahamas |
Scoring by quarter: 23–10, 11–7, 18–7, 17–13

La Basita, David

25 July 2024
16:00

Boxscore

| Costa Rica | 53–56 | Puerto Rico |
Scoring by quarter: 18–14, 11–21, 11–10, 13–11

La Basita, David

26 July 2024
14:00

Boxscore

| Bahamas | 41–62 | Puerto Rico |
Scoring by quarter: 11–14, 10–32, 10–7, 10–9

La Basita, David

26 July 2024
16:00

Boxscore

| El Salvador | 49–43 | Costa Rica |
Scoring by quarter: 10–12, 18–12, 11–10, 10–9

La Basita, David

== 5th–8th place playoffs ==
5th–8th place semifinals
A3 | Dominican Republic | 79
B4 | Bahamas | 31
B3 | Costa Rica | 67
A4 | Nicaragua | 36

5th place match
A3 | Dominican Republic | 84
B3 | Costa Rica | 62
7th place match
B4 | Bahamas | 47
A4 | Nicaragua | 64

=== 5th–8th place semifinals ===
27 July 2024
14:00

Boxscore

| Dominican Republic | 79–31 | Bahamas |
Scoring by quarter: 12–12, 21–3, 28–7, 18–9

La Basita, David

27 July 2024
16:00

Boxscore

| Costa Rica | 67–36 | Nicaragua |
Scoring by quarter: 14–9, 10–16, 26–2, 17–9

La Basita, David

=== 7th place match ===
28 July 2024
13:30

Boxscore

| Bahamas | 47–64 | Nicaragua |
Scoring by quarter: 8–7, 10–14, 16–20, 13–23

La Basita, David

=== 5th place match ===
28 July 2024
15:30

Boxscore

| Dominican Republic | 84–62 | Costa Rica |
Scoring by quarter: 26–14, 20–17, 18–18, 20–13

La Basita, David

== Championship playoffs ==
Semifinals
A1 | Mexico | 93
B2 | El Salvador | 20
B1 | Puerto Rico | 36
A2 | Panama | 69

Final
A1 | Mexico | 56
A2 | Panama | 42
3rd place match
B2 | El Salvador | 48
B1 | Puerto Rico | 65

=== Semifinals ===
27 July 2024
19:00

Boxscore

| Mexico | 93–20 | El Salvador |
Scoring by quarter: 26–6, 22–4, 26–3, 19–7

La Basita, David

27 July 2024
21:00

Boxscore

| Puerto Rico | 36–69 | Panama |
Scoring by quarter: 10–22, 8–11, 11–19, 7–17

La Basita, David

=== 3rd place match ===
28 July 2024
18:00

Boxscore

| El Salvador | 48–65 | Puerto Rico |
Scoring by quarter: 9–18, 15–11, 12–16, 12–20

La Basita, David

=== Final ===
28 July 2024
20:30

Boxscore

| Mexico | 56–42 | Panama |
Scoring by quarter: 10–20, 10–6, 23–5, 13–11

La Basita, David

== Final standings ==
| Rank | Team |
|---|---|
| 1st place, gold medalist(s) | Mexico |
| 2nd place, silver medalist(s) | Panama |
| 3rd place, bronze medalist(s) | Puerto Rico |
| 4 | El Salvador |
| 5 | Dominican Republic |
| 6 | Costa Rica |
| 7 | Nicaragua |
| 8 | Bahamas |

| Qualified for the 2025 FIBA U16 Women's AmeriCup |
