= 2015 FIBA Americas Under-16 Championship for Women =

4th FIBA Under-16 Women's Americas Basketball Championship

Tournament details
- Host country: Mexico
- City: Puebla
- Dates: 24–28 June
- Teams: 8 (from 1 confederation)
- Venue: 1 (in 1 host city)

Final positions
- Champions: Canada (1st title)
- Runners-up: Brazil
- Third place: United States

Tournament statistics
- MVP: (Canada) Alyssa Jerome
- Top scorer: (Honduras) Leva (22.2)
- Top rebounds: (Honduras) Grenald (19.2)
- Top assists: (Cuba) Millet (6.8)
- PPG (Team): United States (79.0)
- RPG (Team): Canada (66.6)
- APG (Team): United States (19.2)

Official website
- Official website

The 2015 FIBA Americas Under-16 Championship for Women was an international basketball competition that was held in Puebla, Mexico from 24 to 28 June 2015.

== First round ==
All times are local (UTC−5).

=== Group A ===
| Pos | Team | Pld | W | L | PF | PA | PD | Pts | Qualification |
|---|---|---|---|---|---|---|---|---|---|
| 1 | United States | 3 | 3 | 0 | 251 | 133 | +118 | 6 | Advance to Semifinals |
| 2 | Mexico | 3 | 2 | 1 | 186 | 187 | −1 | 5 | Advance to Semifinals |
| 3 | Argentina | 3 | 1 | 2 | 167 | 200 | −33 | 4 | Classification 5-8 |
| 4 | Honduras | 3 | 0 | 3 | 138 | 222 | −84 | 3 | Classification 5-8 |

Source: FIBA

24 June 2015
18:00

Boxscore

| Argentina | 48–80 | United States |
Scoring by quarter: 8-17, 11-21, 15-18, 14-24
| Pts: Siciliano 10; Rebs: Fux, Giovanoli 5 Asts: Torruella 3 | | Pts: Espinoza-Hunter, Morris 16; Rebs: Myers 8 Asts: Caldwell 4 |

Puebla (MEX)

24 June 2015
20:00

Boxscore

| Mexico | 74–45 | Honduras |
Scoring by quarter: 10-15, 18-9, 17-11, 29-10
| Pts: Ruiz 24; Rebs: Cano 11; Asts: Rangel 11 | | Pts: Grenald, Leva 14; Rebs: Grenald 23; Asts: Leva, Reichle 2 |

Puebla (MEX)

25 June 2015
14:00

Boxscore

| United States | 86–41 | Honduras |
Scoring by quarter: 12-13, 26-7, 14-12, 34-9
| Pts: Scott-Grayson 18; Rebs: De Costa, Myers 8 Asts: Caldwell 10 | | Pts: Leva 21; Rebs: Grenald 14; Asts: Reichle 3 |

Puebla (MEX)

25 June 2015
20:00

Boxscore

| Mexico | 68–57 | Argentina |
Scoring by quarter: 9-9, 18-15, 25-14, 16-19
| Pts: Navarrete 13; Rebs: Cano 11; Asts: 3 players 5 | | Pts: Foresto 12; Rebs: Pinto 15; Asts: Pinto, Velasco 3 |

Puebla (MEX)

26 June 2015
14:00

Boxscore

| Honduras | 52–62 | Argentina |
Scoring by quarter: 12-10, 5-25, 26-13, 9-14
| Pts: Leva 25; Rebs: Grenald 24; Asts: Grenald 4 | | Pts: Silva 21; Rebs: Siciliano, Silva 9 Asts: Siciliano, Velasco 4 |

Puebla (MEX)

26 June 2015
20:00

Boxscore

| Mexico | 44–85 | United States |
Scoring by quarter: 10-16, 9-17, 13-32, 12-20
| Pts: Ruiz 13; Rebs: Landin 5 Asts: Navarrete 3 | | Pts: Littleton 17; Rebs: Prince 14; Asts: Morris 4 |

Puebla (MEX)

=== Group B ===
| Pos | Team | Pld | W | L | PF | PA | PD | Pts | Qualification |
|---|---|---|---|---|---|---|---|---|---|
| 1 | Canada | 3 | 3 | 0 | 225 | 138 | +87 | 6 | Advance to Semifinals |
| 2 | Brazil | 3 | 2 | 1 | 216 | 154 | +62 | 5 | Advance to Semifinals |
| 3 | Cuba | 3 | 1 | 2 | 166 | 238 | −72 | 4 | Classification 5-8 |
| 4 | Venezuela | 3 | 0 | 3 | 156 | 233 | −77 | 3 | Classification 5-8 |

Source: FIBA

24 June 2015
14:00

Boxscore

| Cuba | 43–85 | Canada |
Scoring by quarter: 12-13, 13-20, 11-28, 7-24
| Pts: Armentero 19; Rebs: Espinosa 8 Asts: Millet 8 | | Pts: Jerome 16; Rebs: Brown 10; Asts: Jerome 6 |

Puebla (MEX)

24 June 2015
16:00

Boxscore

| Venezuela | 40–84 | Brazil |
Scoring by quarter: 10-24, 7-20, 13-24, 10-16
| Pts: Zapata 9 Rebs: Fajardo, Veliz 8 Asts: Diaz, Torres 3 | | Pts: Leite 18; Rebs: Ugwu 13; Asts: Carneiro 5 |

Puebla (MEX)

25 June 2015
16:00

Boxscore

| Brazil | 82–50 | Cuba |
Scoring by quarter: 18-10, 17-13, 24-16, 23-11
| Pts: Leite 17; Rebs: Ugwu 11; Asts: 4 players 4 | | Pts: Millet 17; Rebs: Contreras 9 Asts: Armentero 4 |

Puebla (MEX)

25 June 2015
18:00

Boxscore

| Canada | 76–45 | Venezuela |
Scoring by quarter: 18-8, 20-15, 22-11, 16-11
| Pts: Hanson 11; Rebs: Amihere 12; Asts: Donovan, Hanson 4 | | Pts: Torres 14; Rebs: Fajardo 8 Asts: Diaz, Torres 3 |

Puebla (MEX)

26 June 2015
16:00

Boxscore

| Venezuela | 71–73 | Cuba |
Scoring by quarter: 12-23, 12-12, 24-15, 23-23
| Pts: Zapata 25; Rebs: Fajardo 9 Asts: Alvarez 9 | | Pts: Armentero 20; Rebs: Contreras 16; Asts: Armentero, Millet 8 |

Puebla (MEX)

26 June 2015
18:00

Boxscore

| Canada | 64–50 | Brazil |
Scoring by quarter: 13-21, 15-9, 19-9, 17-11
| Pts: Shand 17; Rebs: Donovan 8 Asts: Jerome, Makolo 3 | | Pts: Leite 16; Rebs: Ugwu 13; Asts: De Oliveira 6 |

Puebla (MEX)

== Final round ==
=== Classification 5–8 ===
27 June 2015
14:00

Boxscore

| Argentina | 64–51 | Venezuela |
Scoring by quarter: 20-15, 20-3, 14-14, 10-19
| Pts: Chagas 17; Rebs: Pinto 15; Asts: Foresto 6 | | Pts: Fajardo 17; Rebs: Betancourt 10; Asts: Alvarez, Zapata 5 |

Puebla (MEX)

27 June 2015
16:00

Boxscore

| Cuba | 59–53 | Honduras |
Scoring by quarter: 18-11, 10-20, 19-8, 12-14
| Pts: Armentero 15; Rebs: Espinosa 13; Asts: Millet 9 | | Pts: Leva 27; Rebs: Grenald 16; Asts: Nativi 4 |

Puebla (MEX)

=== Semifinals ===
27 June 2015
18:00

Boxscore

| United States | 63–72 | Brazil |
Scoring by quarter: 14-21, 13-24, 14-13, 22-14
| Pts: Morris 21; Rebs: Myers 10; Asts: Scott-Grayson 5 | | Pts: Leite 24; Rebs: Lopes 13; Asts: Leite, Lopes 5 |

Puebla (MEX)

27 June 2015
20:00

Boxscore

| Canada | 70–42 | Mexico |
Scoring by quarter: 27-24, 19-8, 10-6, 14-4
| Pts: Jerome 16; Rebs: Jerome 16; Asts: 3 players 3 | | Pts: Ruiz 13; Rebs: Cano, Peña 7 Asts: Navarrete 3 |

Puebla (MEX)

== Final classification games ==
=== Seventh place game ===
28 June 2015
14:00

Boxscore

| Venezuela | 66–64 | Honduras |
Scoring by quarter: 17-11, 14-10, 21-25, 14-18
| Pts: Alvarez 13; Rebs: Betancourt 11; Asts: Alvarez 9 | | Pts: Leva 24; Rebs: Grenald 19; Asts: Leva 4 |

Puebla (MEX)

=== Fifth place game ===
28 June 2015
16:00

Boxscore

| Argentina | 54–68 | Cuba |
Scoring by quarter: 14-15, 13-19, 7-22, 20-12
| Pts: Chagas 19; Rebs: Chagas 7 Asts: Siciliano 5 | | Pts: Armentero 26; Rebs: Contreras 20; Asts: Millet 8 |

Puebla (MEX)

=== Bronze medal game ===
28 June 2015
18:00

Boxscore

| United States | 81–24 | Mexico |
Scoring by quarter: 22-6, 30-8, 19-10, 10-0
| Pts: Morris, Williams 11; Rebs: Caldwell, Williams 12; Asts: Adamas 6 | | Pts: Landin 6 Rebs: Barberio 9 Asts: Rangel 3 |

Puebla (MEX)

=== Final ===
28 June 2015
20:00

Boxscore

| Brazil | 71–72 (OT) | Canada |
Scoring by quarter: 11-11, 12-18, 14-15, 28-21, Overtime: 6-7
| Pts: Leite 32; Rebs: Lopes 16; Asts: Carneiro 6 | | Pts: Jerome 17; Rebs: Jerome 12; Asts: Donovan, Makolo 3 |

Puebla (MEX)

== Awards ==
Most Valuable Player
(Canada) Alyssa Jerome

== Final ranking ==
| Qualified for the 2016 FIBA Under-17 World Championship for Women. |

| Rank | Team | Record |
|---|---|---|
| 1st place, gold medalist(s) | Canada | 5–0 |
| 2nd place, silver medalist(s) | Brazil | 3–2 |
| 3rd place, bronze medalist(s) | United States | 4–1 |
| 4 | Mexico | 2–3 |
| 5 | Cuba | 3–2 |
| 6 | Argentina | 2–3 |
| 7 | Venezuela | 1–4 |
| 8 | Honduras | 0–5 |
