= El Salvador women's national under-15 and under-16 basketball team =

El Salvador
- FIBA zone: FIBA Americas
- National federation: Federación Salvadoreña de Baloncesto

U17 World Cup
- Appearances: None

U16 AmeriCup
- Appearances: 1
- Medals: None

U15 Centrobasket
- Appearances: 3
- Medals: None

The El Salvador women's national under-15 and under-16 basketball team is a national basketball team of El Salvador, administered by the Federación Salvadoreña de Baloncesto. It represents the country in international under-15 and under-16 women's basketball competitions.

== FIBA U15 Women's Centrobasket participations ==
Year	Result
2009	5th
2014	7th
2024	4th

== FIBA Under-16 Women's AmeriCup participations ==
Year	Result
2019	8th

== See also ==
- El Salvador women's national basketball team
- El Salvador women's national under-17 and under-18 basketball team
