= 2017 FIBA Under-16 Women's Americas Championship =

5th FIBA Under-16 Women's Americas Basketball Championship

Tournament details
- Host country: Argentina
- City: Buenos Aires
- Dates: 7–11 June
- Teams: 8 (from 1 confederation)
- Venue: 1 (in 1 host city)

Final positions
- Champions: United States (4th title)
- Runners-up: Canada
- Third place: Argentina

Tournament statistics
- MVP: (United States) Aliyah Boston
- Top scorer: (Mexico) Esquer (17.2)
- Top rebounds: (Canada) Masikewich (10.2)
- Top assists: (Argentina) Chagas (5.2)
- PPG (Team): United States (91.8)
- RPG (Team): United States (59.2)
- APG (Team): United States (19.4)

Official website
- Official website

The 2017 FIBA Under-16 Women's Americas Championship was an international basketball competition that was held in Buenos Aires, Argentina from 7–11 June 2017.

The United States defeated the defending champions Canada, 91–46, in the final game to reclaim the championship. Meanwhile, the hosts Argentina edged first-time semifinalists Colombia in the bronze medal game, 59–52, in overtime. The top four teams qualified to the 2018 FIBA Under-17 Women’s Basketball World Cup.

== Venue ==
Buenos Aires	2017 FIBA Under-16 Women's Americas Championship is located in Argentina
Centro Nacional de Alto Rendimiento Deportivo	2017 FIBA Under-16 Women's Americas Championship is located in Argentina
Capacity: 2,000	2017 FIBA Under-16 Women's Americas Championship is located in Argentina

== Qualified teams ==
- Argentina
- Canada
- Colombia
- Dominican Republic
- Mexico
- Puerto Rico
- United States
- Venezuela

== Group phase ==
A draw was held on 23 May 2017 in San Juan, Puerto Rico.

All times are local (UTC–3).

=== Group A ===
Pos	Team	Pld	W	L	PF	PA	PD	Pts	Qualification
1	Canada	3	3	0	249	151	+98	6	Advance to Semifinals
2	Argentina (H)	3	2	1	213	155	+58	5	Advance to Semifinals
3	Venezuela	3	1	2	150	210	−60	4	Advance to Classification 5-8
4	Dominican Republic	3	0	3	140	236	−96	3	Advance to Classification 5-8

Source: FIBA
(H) Hosts

7 June 2017
13:45

Boxscore

Venezuela	38–89	Canada
Scoring by quarter: 5–23, 9–28, 11–16, 13–22
Pts: Anes 11; Rebs: Russian 4 Asts: Na. Garcia 3		Pts: Masikewich 17; Rebs: Ejim 12; Asts: Te-Biasu, Tuchscherer 4

Centro Nacional de Alto Rendimiento Deportivo, Buenos Aires
Referees: Rodrigo Leon Mejia Mesa (COL), Rebeca Xiomaira Davila Aquino (PUR), Carlos Peralta (ECU)

7 June 2017
20:30

Boxscore

Dominican Republic	42–77	Argentina
Scoring by quarter: 11–23, 8-16, 13-23, 10-15
Pts: Baez 11; Rebs: Cueva 8 Asts: Baez 3		Pts: Operto, Fontana 15; Rebs: Gentinetta 9 Asts: Cejas 8

Centro Nacional de Alto Rendimiento Deportivo, Buenos Aires
Referees: Gina Denise Cross (USA), Vivian Elizabeth Garcia Otermin (URU), Alejandra Gaytan Mota (MEX)

8 June 2017
18:15

Boxscore

Dominican Republic	48–89	Canada
Scoring by quarter: 11–21, 8–27, 11–20, 18–21
Pts: Cueva 12; Rebs: Cueva 8 Asts: 4 players 1		Pts: Masikewich 22; Rebs: Ntambue, Ejim, Masikewich 10; Asts: Ennis, Edwards 4

Centro Nacional de Alto Rendimiento Deportivo, Buenos Aires
Referees: Gina Denise Cross (USA), Rebeca Xiomaira Davila Aquino (PUR), Alejandra Gaytan Mota (MEX)

8 June 2017
20:30

Boxscore

Argentina	71–42	Venezuela
Scoring by quarter: 17–6, 23–13, 20–11, 11–12
Pts: Acevedo 15; Rebs: Gentinetta 5 Asts: Chagas 6		Pts: Arias 11; Rebs: Russian 5 Asts: Anes 1

Centro Nacional de Alto Rendimiento Deportivo, Buenos Aires
Referees: Rodrigo Leon Mejia Mesa (COL), Vivian Elizabeth Garcia Otermin (URU), Carlos Peralta (ECU)

9 June 2017
16:00

Boxscore

Venezuela	70–50	Dominican Republic
Scoring by quarter: 23–6, 12–7, 16–14, 19–23
Pts: Nic. Garcia 11; Rebs: Russian 10; Asts: Na. Garcia 5		Pts: Acosta 12; Rebs: Cueva 16; Asts: Acosta, Baez 2

Centro Nacional de Alto Rendimiento Deportivo, Buenos Aires
Referees: Rodrigo Leon Mejia Mesa (COL), Rebeca Xiomaira Davila Aquino (PUR), Vivian Elizabeth Garcia Otermin (URU)

9 June 2017
20:30

Boxscore

Canada	71–65	Argentina
Scoring by quarter: 17–10, 21–16, 10–16, 23–23
Pts: Te-Biasu, Masikewich 15; Rebs: Masikewich 20; Asts: Te-Biasu, Ennis 3		Pts: Acevedo 19; Rebs: Chagas 12; Asts: Chagas 7

Centro Nacional de Alto Rendimiento Deportivo, Buenos Aires
Referees: Andres Gaston Bartel Maina (URU), Gina Denise Cross (USA), Alejandra Gaytan Mota (MEX)

=== Group B ===
Pos	Team	Pld	W	L	PF	PA	PD	Pts	Qualification
1	United States	3	3	0	270	102	+168	6	Advance to Semifinals
2	Colombia	3	2	1	146	184	−38	5	Advance to Semifinals
3	Mexico	3	1	2	154	194	−40	4	Advance to Classification 5-8
4	Puerto Rico	3	0	3	133	223	−90	3	Advance to Classification 5-8

Source: FIBA

==== Preliminary Round ====
In the first preliminary round game, Colombia faced the US. Aliyah Boston was the leading scorer for the US team with 17 points, while Samantha Brunelle scored 13. Caitlin Clark took three shots from beyond the three point arc and hit all three of them. Kylie Watson and Paige Bueckers were also double-digit scorers with 10 points each. The US won by a score of 91–33.

The US next faced Mexico. The opening quarter was close with the US leading by a single point at the end of the quarter. A full court press in the second quarter helped the United States pull away from Mexico en route to a 100–37 win. Brunelle had a double double with 18 points and 11 rebounds. Bueckers took seven shots and hit all seven to set a US single-game record for field-goal percentage.

The final preliminary game for the US was against Puerto Rico. The US did not shoot well from the field, hitting only 31% of the shots. They had difficulty controlling the ball, turning it over 27 times, but their aggressive play forced 43 turnovers against Puerto Rico which included a US U16 record of 25 steals in a single game. The leading scorer was Boston who recorded 17 points and tied a record for free throw percentage hitting all five of her free-throw attempts. The US won the game 79–32.

7 June 2017
16:00

Boxscore

Colombia	33–91	United States
Scoring by quarter: 4–32, 15–14, 9–26, 5–19
Pts: Ulloa 7 Rebs: Gonzalez 6 Asts: Ayala 2		Pts: Boston 17; Rebs: Boston 9 Asts: Brunelle 5

Centro Nacional de Alto Rendimiento Deportivo, Buenos Aires
Referees: Natalia Cuello Cuello (DOM), Micaela Ayelen Prado (ARG), Christine Vuong (CAN)

7 June 2017
18:15

Boxscore

Mexico	76–49	Puerto Rico
Scoring by quarter: 15–14, 15–14, 15–14, 15–14
Pts: Esquer 34; Rebs: Aguilera 14; Asts: Arreola 6		Pts: Santiago, Martinez, Garcia 10; Rebs: An. Rodriguez 9 Asts: Santiago, Martinez 2

Centro Nacional de Alto Rendimiento Deportivo, Buenos Aires
Referees: Americo Rodriguez (VEN), Andres Gaston Bartel Maina (URU), Virginia Soledad Peruchini (ARG)

8 June 2017
13:45

Boxscore

Puerto Rico	52–68	Colombia
Scoring by quarter: 18–15, 9–25, 13–20, 12–8
Pts: Garcia 17; Rebs: An. Rodriguez 10; Asts: Garcia, Vargas-Bines 2		Pts: Gonzalez 20; Rebs: Gonzalez 11; Asts: Orozco 5

Centro Nacional de Alto Rendimiento Deportivo, Buenos Aires
Referees: Natalia Cuello Cuello (DOM), Micaela Ayelen Prado (ARG), Americo Rodriguez (VEN)

8 June 2017
16:00

Boxscore

United States	100–37	Mexico
Scoring by quarter: 14–13, 33–14, 26–4, 27–6
Pts: Brunelle 18; Rebs: Brunelle 11; Asts: Cooke, Horston 4		Pts: Esquer 15; Rebs: Gallegos, Arreola, Rodriguez 5 Asts: Arreola 3

Centro Nacional de Alto Rendimiento Deportivo, Buenos Aires
Referees: Andres Gaston Bartel Maina (URU), Virginia Soledad Peruchini (ARG), Christine Vuong (CAN)

9 June 2017
13:45

Boxscore

Colombia	45–41	Mexico
Scoring by quarter: 11–9, 8–9, 12–15, 14–8
Pts: Gonzalez 15; Rebs: Gonzalez 19; Asts: Diaz, Orozco, Ulloa 2		Pts: Esquer 10; Rebs: Rodriguez 10; Asts: Arreola 5

Centro Nacional de Alto Rendimiento Deportivo, Buenos Aires
Referees: Americo Rodriguez (VEN), Natalia Cuello Cuello (DOM), Carlos Peralta (ECU)

9 June 2017
18:15

Boxscore

Puerto Rico	32–79	United States
Scoring by quarter: 5–15, 10–20, 14–25, 3–19
Pts: Martinez 14; Rebs: Vargas-Bines 10; Asts: Martinez, Ab. Rodriguez, Aviles 2		Pts: Boston 17; Rebs: Boston 12; Asts: Fudd, Clark 4

Centro Nacional de Alto Rendimiento Deportivo, Buenos Aires
Referees: Virginia Soledad Peruchini (ARG), Micaela Ayelen Prado (ARG), Christine Vuong (CAN)

== Classification round ==
All times are local (UTC-3).

5th–8th
10 June
Venezuela	62
Puerto Rico	61
10 June
Mexico	102
Dominican Republic	45

Fifth place
11 June
Venezuela	28
Mexico	71
Seventh place
11 June
Puerto Rico	76
Dominican Republic	69

=== Classification 5–8 ===
10 June 2017
13:45

Boxscore

Venezuela	62–61	Puerto Rico
Scoring by quarter: 20–12, 15–11, 15–20, 12–18
Pts: Arias 19; Rebs: Russian 13; Asts: Perez 5		Pts: Martinez 14; Rebs: Vargas-Bines 8 Asts: Martinez 6

Centro Nacional de Alto Rendimiento Deportivo, Buenos Aires
Referees: Gina Denise Cross (USA), Micaela Ayelen Prado (ARG), Christine Vuong (CAN)

10 June 2017
16:00

Boxscore

Mexico	102–45	Dominican Republic
Scoring by quarter: 31–11, 30–10, 16–11, 25–13
Pts: Gallegos 21; Rebs: Rodriguez 11; Asts: Gallegos 11		Pts: Cueva 10; Rebs: Cueva 9 Asts: 4 players 2

Centro Nacional de Alto Rendimiento Deportivo, Buenos Aires
Referees: Virginia Soledad Peruchini (ARG), Rebeca Xiomaira Davila Aquino (PUR), Vivian Elizabeth Garcia Otermin (URU)

=== Seventh place game ===
11 June 2017
13:45

Boxscore

Puerto Rico	76–69	Dominican Republic
Scoring by quarter: 19–24, 27–15, 11–8, 19–22
Pts: Verdejo, Vargas-Bines 17; Rebs: Vargas-Bines 9 Asts: Martinez, S. Rodriguez 3		Pts: Benitez 20; Rebs: Santana 10; Asts: Baez 4

Centro Nacional de Alto Rendimiento Deportivo, Buenos Aires
Referees: Vivian Elizabeth Garcia Otermin (URU), Micaela Ayelen Prado (ARG), Christine Vuong (CAN)

=== Fifth place game ===
11 June 2017
20:30

Boxscore

Venezuela	28–71	Mexico
Scoring by quarter: 4–17, 8–17, 10–14, 6–23
Pts: Perez, Arias 7 Rebs: Russian 11; Asts: Na. Garcia, Arias, Nic. Garcia 1		Pts: Arreola 13; Rebs: Arreola, Aguilera 10; Asts: Arreola 5

Centro Nacional de Alto Rendimiento Deportivo, Buenos Aires
Referees: Rodrigo Leon Mejia Mesa (COL), Rebeca Xiomaira Davila Aquino (PUR), Virginia Soledad Peruchini (ARG)

== Final round ==
All times are local (UTC-3).

Semifinals
10 June
Canada	64
Colombia	38
10 June
United States	98
Argentina	42

Final
11 June
Canada	46
United States	91
Third place
11 June
Colombia	52
Argentina (OT)	59

=== Semifinals ===
10 June 2017
18:15

Boxscore

Canada	64–38	Colombia
Scoring by quarter: 18–8, 13–13, 19–10, 14–7
Pts: Russell 11; Rebs: Russell 8 Asts: Cote-Lysius 4		Pts: Quesada 10; Rebs: Diaz, Cortes, Morales 5 Asts: 4 players 1

Centro Nacional de Alto Rendimiento Deportivo, Buenos Aires
Referees: Andres Gaston Bartel Maina (URU), Natalia Cuello Cuello (DOM), Alejandra Gaytan Mota (MEX)

10 June 2017
20:30

Boxscore

United States	98–42	Argentina
Scoring by quarter: 17–13, 23–14, 30–9, 28–6
Pts: Cooke, Taylor 12; Rebs: Miller 7 Asts: 4 players 3		Pts: Gauna, Acevedo 12; Rebs: Gauna, Piri, Gentinetta 5 Asts: Chagas 3

Centro Nacional de Alto Rendimiento Deportivo, Buenos Aires
Referees: Americo Rodriguez (VEN), Rodrigo Leon Mejia Mesa (COL), Carlos Peralta (ECU)

=== Third place game ===
==== US - Argentina ====
The United States played Argentina in the semifinal game. The US had a 13-point lead at halftime, 40–27, but partway through the third period, started to run that would put the game away. They scored 39 consecutive points which extended from roughly the middle of the third period until the middle of the fourth. they had set an all-time record for steals in a game against Puerto Rico but they increase their own record by two with 27 steals in the game. They also set our record for free throws attempted with 37 every one of the US players scored. The final score in favor of the US was 98–42.

11 June 2017
18:15

Boxscore

Colombia	52–59 (OT)	Argentina
Scoring by quarter: 6–20, 7–6, 17–12, 19–11, Overtime: 3–10
Pts: Orozco 15; Rebs: Ayala, Gonzalez 9 Asts: Diaz 2		Pts: Chagas 20; Rebs: Chagas 20; Asts: Gauna 5

Centro Nacional de Alto Rendimiento Deportivo, Buenos Aires
Referees: Americo Rodriguez (VEN), Gina Denise Cross (USA), Natalia Cuello Cuello (DOM)

=== Final ===
==== US - Canada ====
In the gold-medal game, the United States faced Canada. This game also featured a long scoring run, with the United States outscoring Canada 20–0 to close the first half. Aggressive defense held Canada to 29% field goal shooting for the game. Azzi Fudd, the only 14-year-old on a team of 15 and 16-year-olds, scored 18 points to lead the US team to a 91–46 win and the gold medal.

11 June 2017
20:30

Boxscore

Canada	46–91	United States
Scoring by quarter: 21–27, 4–23, 10–18, 11–23
Pts: Russell 12; Rebs: Masikewich 9 Asts: Ntambue 2		Pts: Fudd 18; Rebs: Horston, Boston 6 Asts: Horston 4

Centro Nacional de Alto Rendimiento Deportivo, Buenos Aires
Referees: Andres Gaston Bartel Maina (URU), Alejandra Gaytan Mota (MEX), Carlos Peralta (ECU)

== Awards ==
2017 FIBA Under-16 Women's
Americas Championship winners

United States
4th title

Most Valuable Player
(United States) Aliyah Boston

== Final ranking ==
Qualify for the 2018 FIBA Under-17 Women's Basketball World Cup.

Rank	Team	Record
1st place, gold medalist(s)	United States	5–0
2nd place, silver medalist(s)	Canada	4–1
3rd place, bronze medalist(s)	Argentina	3–2
4	Colombia	2–3
5	Mexico	3–2
6	Venezuela	2–3
7	Puerto Rico	1–4
8	Dominican Republic	0–5
