= Bahamas women's national under-15 basketball team =

Bahamian youth basketball team

Bahamas
- FIBA zone: FIBA Americas
- National federation: Bahamas Basketball Federation

U17 World Cup
- Appearances: None

U16 AmeriCup
- Appearances: None

U15 Centrobasket
- Appearances: 3
- Medals: None

The Bahamas women's national under-15 basketball team is a national basketball team of The Bahamas, administered by the Bahamas Basketball Federation. It represents the country in international under-15 women's basketball competitions. The team also participated at the COCABA U16 Women's Championship in 2016, where they won the gold medal.

== FIBA U15 Women's Centrobasket participations ==
Year	Result
2012	6th
2022	4th
2024	8th

== See also ==
- Bahamas women's national basketball team
- Bahamas women's national under-17 basketball team
- Bahamas men's national under-15 and under-16 basketball team
