= Patricia Ayala =

Uruguayan politician

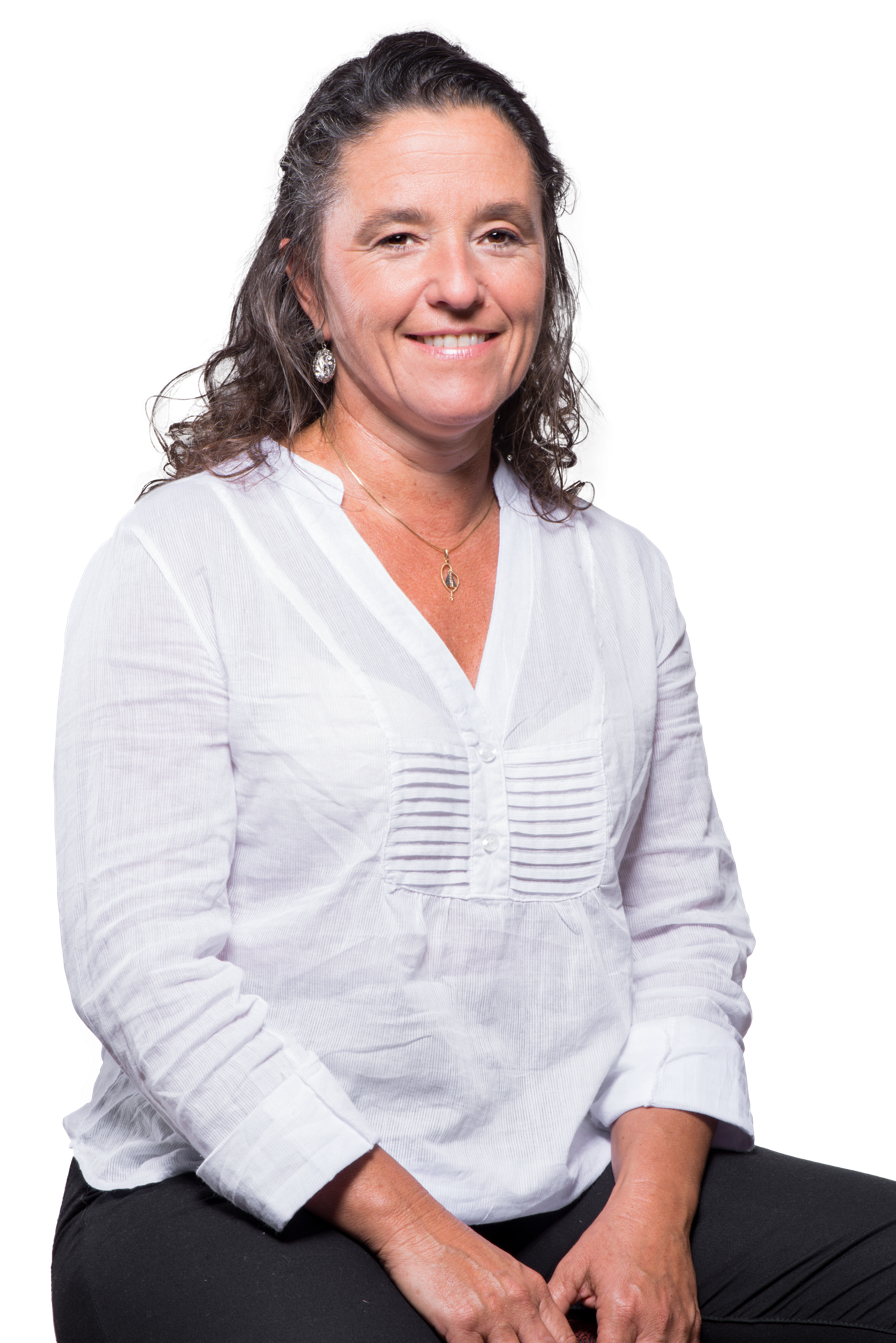
Patricia Ayala.

Ana Patricia Ayala Sánchez (born 25 August 1966 in Artigas Department) is a Uruguayan speech therapist and politician.

== Biography ==
In 2010, she was elected as the first female Intendant of Artigas Department.

In 2017, she was temporarily the Vice President of Uruguay.

As of June 2018, she is temporarily the President of Uruguay.
