= Panama women's national under-15 and under-16 basketball team =

Panama
- FIBA zone: FIBA Americas
- National federation: Basketball Federation of Panama

U17 World Cup
- Appearances: None

U16 AmeriCup
- Appearances: 1 (2025)
- Medals: None

U15 Centrobasket
- Appearances: 1
- Medals: (silver) Silver: 1 (2024)

The Panama women's national under-15 and under-16 basketball team is a national basketball team of Panama, administered by the Basketball Federation of Panama. It represents the country in international under-15 and under-16 women's basketball competitions.

== FIBA U15 Women's Centrobasket participations ==
Year	Result
2024	2nd place, silver medalist(s)

== FIBA Under-16 Women's AmeriCup participations ==
Year	Result
2025	8th

== See also ==
- Panama men's national basketball team
- Panama men's national under-15 basketball team
