= FIBA U15 Women's Centrobasket =

International youth basketball tournament

- Most recent season or competition: 2024 FIBA U15 Women's Centrobasket
- Sport: Basketball
- Founded: 2009
- Organizing body: FIBA Americas
- No. of teams: 8
- Continent: Central America and the Caribbean
- Most recent champion: Mexico (4th title)
- Most titles: Mexico (4 titles)
- Qualification: FIBA Under-16 Women's AmeriCup
- Related competitions: FIBA U17 Women's Centrobasket
- Website: www.fiba.basketball/history

The FIBA U15 Women's Centrobasket is an under-15 girls' basketball tournament held about every two years among 31 countries of Central America and the Caribbean and is organized in part by FIBA Americas. The tournament serves as a gateway to the FIBA Under-16 Women's AmeriCup. Originally, this competition was played in the under-16 age category, and since 2012 it has been played in the under-15 age category.

== Summary ==
| Year | Host | Gold | Silver | Bronze |
|---|---|---|---|---|
| 2009 | Mexico (León, Guanajuato) | Mexico | Puerto Rico | Dominican Republic |
| 2012 | Mexico (Mexico City) | Puerto Rico | Mexico | Costa Rica |
| 2014 | Mexico (Chiapas) | Mexico | Honduras | Cuba |
| 2022 | Puerto Rico (Gurabo) | Mexico | Puerto Rico | Dominican Republic |
| 2024 | Panama (David) | Mexico | Panama | Puerto Rico |

== Medal table ==
| Rank | Nation | Gold | Silver | Bronze | Total |
|---|---|---|---|---|---|
| 1 | Mexico | 4 | 1 | 0 | 5 |
| 2 | Puerto Rico | 1 | 2 | 1 | 4 |
| 3 | Honduras | 0 | 1 | 0 | 1 |
| 3 | Panama | 0 | 1 | 0 | 1 |
| 5 | Dominican Republic | 0 | 0 | 2 | 2 |
| 6 | Costa Rica | 0 | 0 | 1 | 1 |
| 6 | Cuba | 0 | 0 | 1 | 1 |
| Totals (7 entries) | | 5 | 5 | 5 | 15 |

== Participation details ==
| Team | (Mexico); 2009 | (Puerto Rico); 2012 | (Mexico); 2014 | (Mexico); 2022 | (Mexico); 2024 |
| Bahamas | — | 6th | — | 4th | 8th |
| Barbados | — | 7th | — | — | — |
| Cayman Islands | — | 5th | — | — | — |
| Costa Rica | — | 3rd | — | — | 6th |
| Cuba | — | — | 3rd | — | — |
| Dominican Republic | 3rd | — | 6th | 3rd | 5th |
| El Salvador | 5th | — | 7th | — | 4th |
| Guatemala | 4th | 4th | 5th | — | — |
| Honduras | — | — | 2nd | — | — |
| Mexico | 1st | 2nd | 1st | 1st | 1st |
| Nicaragua | — | — | — | — | 7th |
| Panama | — | — | — | — | 2nd |
| Puerto Rico | 2nd | 1st | 4th | 2nd | 3rd |
| Virgin Islands | — | — | 8th | — | — |
