= Mexico women's national under-17 basketball team =

Mexico
- FIBA zone: FIBA Americas
- National federation: ADEMEBA
- Coach: Juan Alberto López

U17 World Cup
- Appearances: 5

U16 AmeriCup
- Appearances: 9
- Medals: (bronze) Bronze: (2021, 2025)

U15 Centrobasket
- Appearances: 5
- Medals: (gold) Gold: (2009, 2014, 2022, 2024); (silver) Silver: (2012)

The Mexico women's national under-15, under-16 and under-17 basketball team is a national basketball team of Mexico, administered by the Asociación Deportiva Mexicana de Básquetbol. It represents the country in international under-15, under-16 and under-17 women's basketball competitions.

In 2024, Mexico hosted the FIBA Under-17 Women's Basketball World Cup. It was the first time that Mexico has hosted a FIBA global event, which earned Mexico an automatic qualification as host, finished 15th.

== Tournament record ==
=== FIBA Under-17 World Cup ===
Year	Result
(France) 2010	Did not qualify
(Netherlands) 2012	Did not qualify
(Czech Republic) 2014	14th
(Spain) 2016	14th
(Belarus) 2018	Did not qualify
(Hungary) 2022	16th
(Mexico) 2024	15th
(Czech Republic) 2026	15th

=== FIBA Under-16 AmeriCup ===
Year	Result
2009	5th
2011	7th
2013	4th
2015	4th
2017	5th
2019	7th
2021	3rd place, bronze medalist(s)
2023	7th
2025	3rd place, bronze medalist(s)

=== FIBA U15 Centrobasket ===
Year	Result
2009	1st place, gold medalist(s)
2012	2nd place, silver medalist(s)
2014	1st place, gold medalist(s)
2022	1st place, gold medalist(s)
2024	1st place, gold medalist(s)

== See also ==
- Mexico women's national basketball team
- Mexico women's national under-19 basketball team
- Mexico men's national under-17 basketball team
