= Honduras women's national under-15 and under-16 basketball team =

Honduras
- FIBA zone: FIBA Americas
- National federation: Federación Nacional de Baloncesto de Honduras

U17 World Cup
- Appearances: None

U16 AmeriCup
- Appearances: 1
- Medals: None

U15 Centrobasket
- Appearances: 1
- Medals: (silver) Silver: 1 (2014)

The Honduras women's national under-15 and under-16 basketball team is a national basketball team of Honduras, administered by the Federación Nacional de Baloncesto de Honduras. It represents the country in international under-15 and under-16 women's basketball competitions.

== FIBA U15 Women's Centrobasket participations ==
Year	Result
2014	2nd place, silver medalist(s)

== FIBA Under-16 Women's AmeriCup participations ==
Year	Result
2015	8th

== See also ==
- Honduras men's national basketball team
