= Nicaragua women's national under-15 basketball team =

Nicaragua
- FIBA zone: FIBA Americas
- National federation: Federación Nicaraguense de Baloncesto

U17 World Cup
- Appearances: None

U16 AmeriCup
- Appearances: None

U15 Centrobasket
- Appearances: 1 (2024)
- Medals: None

The Nicaragua women's national under-15 basketball team is a national basketball team of Nicaragua, administered by the Federación Nicaraguense de Baloncesto. It represents the country in international under-15 women's basketball competitions.

The team's first international participation was at the 2024 FIBA U15 Women's Centrobasket, where they finished in the seventh place.

== See also ==
- Nicaragua women's national basketball team
- Nicaragua women's national under-17 basketball team
