= Costa Rica women's national under-15 and under-16 basketball team =

Costa Rica
- FIBA zone: FIBA Americas
- National federation: Federación Costarricense de Baloncesto Aficionado

U17 World Cup
- Appearances: None

U16 AmeriCup
- Appearances: 2
- Medals: None

U15 Centrobasket
- Appearances: 2
- Medals: (bronze) Bronze: 1 (2012)

The Costa Rica women's national under-15 and under-16 basketball team is a national basketball team of Costa Rica, administered by the Federación Costarricense de Baloncesto Aficionado. It represents the country in international under-15 and under-16 women's basketball competitions.

== FIBA U15 Women's Centrobasket participations ==
Year	Result
2012	3rd place, bronze medalist(s)
2024	6th

== FIBA Under-16 Women's AmeriCup participations ==
Year	Result
2013	8th
2021	8th

== See also ==
- Costa Rica women's national basketball team
- Costa Rica women's national under-17 and under-18 basketball team
- Costa Rica men's national under-15 and under-16 basketball team
