= Dominican Republic women's national under-15 and under-16 basketball team =

Dominican Republic
- FIBA zone: FIBA Americas
- National federation: Federación Dominicana de Baloncesto

U17 World Cup
- Appearances: None

U16 AmeriCup
- Appearances: 3
- Medals: None

U15 Centrobasket
- Appearances: 4
- Medals: (bronze) Bronze: 2 (2009, 2022)

The Dominican Republic women's national under-15 and under-16 basketball team is a national basketball team of the Dominican Republic, administered by the Federación Dominicana de Baloncesto. It represents the country in international under-15 and under-16 women's basketball competitions.

== FIBA U15 Women's Centrobasket participations ==
| Year | Result |
|---|---|
| 2009 | 3rd place, bronze medalist(s) |
| 2014 | 6th |
| 2022 | 3rd place, bronze medalist(s) |
| 2024 | 5th |

== FIBA Under-16 Women's AmeriCup participations ==
| Year | Result |
|---|---|
| 2009 | 7th |
| 2017 | 8th |
| 2023 | 8th |

== See also ==
- Dominican Republic women's national basketball team
- Dominican Republic women's national under-17 and under-18 basketball team
- Dominican Republic men's national under-17 basketball team
