= 2026 FIBA Under-17 Women's Basketball World Cup squads =

Basketball tournament squads

This article shows the rosters of all participating teams at the 2026 FIBA Under-17 Women's Basketball World Cup in Czech Republic.

Squad was announced on FIBA website.

== Group A ==
=== Australia ===
A 12-player squad was announced on 10 July 2026.

Australia women's national under-17 basketball team roster
Players
Coaches

Pos.	No.	Name	Age – Date of birth	Height	Club
F	4	Jay Sebasio	16 – 13 January 2010	1.83 m (6 ft 0 in)	(Australia) Centre of Excellence
G	5	Daisy Hocking	17 – 11 May 2009	1.77 m (5 ft 10 in)	South Australia
G	6	Isabel Smith	17 – 8 January 2009	1.79 m (5 ft 10 in)	(Australia) Centre of Excellence
G	7	Olivia Olechnowicz	17 – 7 February 2009	1.77 m (5 ft 10 in)	(Australia) Centre of Excellence
F	8	Jade Sherrington	17 – 14 January 2009	1.84 m (6 ft 0 in)	(Australia) Centre of Excellence
G	9	Jasmine Jones	16 – 6 May 2010	1.77 m (5 ft 10 in)	(Australia) Centre of Excellence
F	10	Sophie Richardson	17 – 12 January 2009	1.85 m (6 ft 1 in)	(Australia) Victoria State
F	11	Madison Ryan	17 – 31 March 2009	1.91 m (6 ft 3 in)	(Australia) Victoria State
C	12	Lily Mapp	17 – 7 April 2009	1.92 m (6 ft 4 in)	(Australia) Centre of Excellence
F	13	Eliza Ashby	16 – 23 July 2009	1.86 m (6 ft 1 in)	(Australia) Victoria State
F	14	Matilda Trout	16 – 20 August 2009	1.90 m (6 ft 3 in)	(Australia) Victoria State
C	15	Jemyma Manyok	17 – 2 February 2009	1.95 m (6 ft 5 in)	(Australia) Centre of Excellence

Head coach

Thomas Garlepp

Assistant coach(es)

Zoe Carr
Jenny Lonergan

=== Ivory Coast ===
A 12-player squad was announced on 10 July 2026.

Côte d'Ivoire women's national under-17 basketball team roster
Players
Coaches

Pos.	No.	Name	Age – Date of birth	Height	Club
SG	1	Salimata Koné	16 – 27 April 2010	1.72 m (5 ft 8 in)	(France) As Orly Basket
SF	2	Fatima Diouf	16 – 17 September 2009	1.77 m (5 ft 10 in)	(United States) Académie Putman
PF	4	Sarah Keita	17 – 15 April 2009	1.75 m (5 ft 9 in)	(France) ES Montgeron BB
PG	5	Ella Koné	17 – 1 February 2009	1.65 m (5 ft 5 in)	(Ivory Coast) GATICE
PG	6	Fatima Konate	16 – 23 September 2009	1.68 m (5 ft 6 in)	(Ivory Coast) HBBC
PG	7	Adja Traoré	17 – 18 February 2009	1.66 m (5 ft 5 in)	(Ivory Coast) AWANE
PF	9	Mary Diomande	17 – 17 March 2009	1.84 m (6 ft 0 in)	(France) UFAB 49
SG	10	Maelhys N'Dri	16 – 4 December 2009	1.78 m (5 ft 10 in)	(France) ALPCM Nantes
SF	13	Abigail Dia	17 – 10 February 2009	1.76 m (5 ft 9 in)	(France) Toulouse Métropole
SF	14	Lalya Diarisso	16 – 14 September 2009	1.80 m (5 ft 11 in)	(France) BTCM
C	23	Aichata Mambone	16 – 23 May 2010	1.85 m (6 ft 1 in)	(Ivory Coast) HBBC
PF	93	Aminata Koné	17 – 19 February 2009	1.83 m (6 ft 0 in)	(France) Charnay Basket

Head coach

Thoms Thano N'da

Assistant coach(es)

Sékou Koné
Bougouha Blé

=== Latvia ===
A 12-player squad was announced on 7 July 2026.

Latvia women's national under-17 basketball team roster
Players
Coaches

Pos.	No.	Name	Age – Date of birth	Height	Club
PG	1	Jeļizaveta Naidjonova	17 – 10 March 2009	1.72 m (5 ft 8 in)	(Latvia) Daugavpils BJSS
PG	3	Enija Brokāne	17 – 2 January 2009	1.70 m (5 ft 7 in)	(Latvia) Bertānu VBS/Liepājas SSS
PF	5	Adele Priedīte	16 – 5 October 2009	1.84 m (6 ft 0 in)	(Latvia) RBS Centrs
PG	7	Monta Čulkstēna	16 – 16 December 2009	1.76 m (5 ft 9 in)	(Latvia) RBS Centrs
SG	9	Melānija Lagunoviča	16 – 7 September 2009	1.72 m (5 ft 8 in)	(Latvia) RBS Centrs
PF	12	Marta Arsentjeva	17 – 12 June 2009	1.85 m (6 ft 1 in)	(Latvia) Jūrmala
SF	17	Patrīcija Tikmere	17 – 28 May 2009	1.82 m (6 ft 0 in)	(Latvia) RBS Jugla
PF	18	Darina Ivanova	16 – 11 March 2010	1.86 m (6 ft 1 in)	(Latvia) RSS Rīdzene
SF	20	Laura Ķikuste	15 – 28 October 2010	1.86 m (6 ft 1 in)	(Latvia) Kolibri/RSS Rīdzene
SG	21	Evelīna Sirsniņa	17 – 21 March 2009	1.76 m (5 ft 9 in)	(Latvia) Ogres BS
PF	24	Madara Šakalova	17 – 23 March 2009	1.86 m (6 ft 1 in)	(Latvia) Ogres BS
SG	35	Šarlote Skrebele	17 – 30 March 2009	1.82 m (6 ft 0 in)	(Latvia) RBS Centrs

Head coach

Ilze Ose-Hlebovicka

Assistant coach(es)

Mārcis Pliens
Irina Romaņenko

=== United States ===
A 12-player squad was announced on 25 May 2026.

United States women's national under-17 basketball team roster
Players
Coaches

Pos.	No.	Name	Age – Date of birth	Height	Club
G	4	Morghan Reckley	16 – 17 November 2009	1.70 m (5 ft 7 in)	(United States) Sandy Creek High School
G	5	Jazman Bailey	17 – 4 January 2009	1.75 m (5 ft 9 in)	(United States) Lake Ridge High School
F	6	Nation Williams	16 – 7 August 2009	1.88 m (6 ft 2 in)	(United States) Centennial High School
G	7	Tatianna Griffin	16 – 13 February 2010	1.80 m (5 ft 11 in)	(United States) Mater Dei High School
F	8	Ivanna Wilson Manyacka	17 – 26 May 2009	1.85 m (6 ft 1 in)	(United States) Bullis School
F	9	Micah Ojo	16 – 30 October 2009	1.83 m (6 ft 0 in)	(United States) Princess Anne High School
F	10	Maliya Hunter	17 – 2 June 2009	1.88 m (6 ft 2 in)	(United States) Archbishop Mitty High School
G	11	Arianna Robinson	16 – 22 June 2010	1.78 m (5 ft 10 in)	(United States) Plano East Senior High School
G	12	Olivia Jones	17 – 23 January 2009	1.80 m (5 ft 11 in)	(United States) Vanderbilt University
F	13	Eve Long	17 – 24 January 2009	1.90 m (6 ft 3 in)	(United States) Olathe South High School
F	14	Nya Riak	16 – 26 June 2010	1.88 m (6 ft 2 in)	(United States) La Follette High School
C	15	Caroline Bradley	17 – 14 January 2009	1.96 m (6 ft 5 in)	(United States) Oak Grove High School

Head coach

Steve Gomez

Assistant coach(es)

Brittanny Johnson
Krystle Johnson

== Group B ==
=== China ===
A 12-player squad was announced on 4 July 2026.

China women's national under-17 basketball team roster
Players
Coaches

Pos.	No.	Name	Age – Date of birth	Height	Club
PG	5	Sun Xuan	17 – 2 January 2009	1.70 m (5 ft 7 in)	(China) Jiangsu Sports Bureau
F	6	Wang Xinyue	17 – 17 April 2009	1.78 m (5 ft 10 in)	(China) Jiangsu Sports Bureau
G	7	Jia Yu	16 – 19 September 2009	1.75 m (5 ft 9 in)	(China) Jiangsu Sports Bureau
SG	8	Sun Ruoyan	16 – 23 November 2009	1.74 m (5 ft 9 in)	(China) No.1 Middle School of Linyi
G	9	Feng Ying	17 – 26 February 2009	1.71 m (5 ft 7 in)	(China) Sichuan Sports College
PF	10	Wu Mengjie	17 – 16 February 2009	1.78 m (5 ft 10 in)	(China) Chongqing Luneng Bashu School
SF	11	Li Yuanshan	17 – 22 February 2009	1.78 m (5 ft 10 in)	(China) Jiangsu Sports Bureau
C	12	Sun Hanyun	16 – 10 April 2010	1.89 m (6 ft 2 in)	(China) Tsinghua University High School
C	14	Pang Yunshu	15 – 5 November 2010	1.90 m (6 ft 3 in)	(China) Tsinghua University High School
C	15	Tang Yatong	16 – 10 February 2010	1.95 m (6 ft 5 in)	(China) Jiangsu Sports Bureau
PF	18	Wan Jiayi	15 – 21 September 2010	1.91 m (6 ft 3 in)	(China) No.35 Middle School of Linyi
C	19	Wang Yiming	16 – 26 August 2009	1.91 m (6 ft 3 in)	(China) Zhejiang College of Sports

Head coach

Liu Yang

Assistant coach(es)

Miloš Gligorijević
Ji Yanyan
Jia Guang

=== Germany ===
A 12-player squad was announced on 8 July 2026.

Germany women's national under-17 basketball team roster
Players
Coaches

Pos.	No.	Name	Age – Date of birth	Height	Club
C	1	Amelie Mbah	17 – 11 June 2009	1.92 m (6 ft 4 in)	(Germany) Eisvögel USC Freiburg
PG	3	Leonie Pfanzelt	15 – 5 August 2010	1.71 m (5 ft 7 in)	(Germany) TSG Bruchsal/USC Heidelberg
PG	5	Linda Thimm	16 – 18 July 2009	1.70 m (5 ft 7 in)	(Germany) Talents Bonn Rhöndorf
PF	6	Moescha Feunou Bakam	16 – 25 November 2009	1.84 m (6 ft 0 in)	(Germany) TG 48 Würzburg
SG	8	Darina Zraychenko	17 – 25 February 2009	1.75 m (5 ft 9 in)	(Germany) TSV 1860 Hagen/Herner TC
G	10	Leni Schramm-Bünning	16 – 29 August 2009	1.82 m (6 ft 0 in)	(Germany) USC Heidelberg
SF	12	Lara Gierlich	17 – 5 March 2009	1.87 m (6 ft 2 in)	(Germany) Eisvögel USC Freiburg
SG	13	Mia Wiegand	17 – 6 January 2009	1.80 m (5 ft 11 in)	(Germany) TG 48 Würzburg
F	14	Frederike Askamp	17 – 7 July 2009	1.90 m (6 ft 3 in)	(Germany) Eisvögel USC Freiburg
C	16	Mathilda Haensch	16 – 13 August 2009	1.90 m (6 ft 3 in)	(Germany) Alba Berlin
PF	18	Nele Prowaznik	15 – 26 August 2010	1.94 m (6 ft 4 in)	(Germany) TK Hannover
PF	21	Silvia Heide	17 – 13 May 2009	1.86 m (6 ft 1 in)	(Germany) Jahn München

Head coach

Heiko Czach

Assistant coach(es)

Corina Kollarovics
Alexandra Maerz

=== Mexico ===
A 12-player squad was announced on 17 June 2026.

Mexico women's national under-17 basketball team roster
Players
Coaches

Pos.	No.	Name	Age – Date of birth	Height	Club
PF	3	Jordan Martin	15 – 24 March 2011	1.82 m (6 ft 0 in)	(Mexico) Ciudad de México
F	4	Mariana Díaz	16 – 20 October 2009	1.82 m (6 ft 0 in)	(Mexico) Coahuila
PG	6	Jimena Velázquez	16 – 21 December 2009	1.71 m (5 ft 7 in)	(Mexico) Chihuahua
G	7	Meredith Jaime	17 – 29 June 2009	1.70 m (5 ft 7 in)	(Mexico) Nuevo León
F	9	Ivanna Olalde	16 – 10 June 2010	1.78 m (5 ft 10 in)	(Mexico) Nuevo León
F	10	Aislin Tamez	17 – 11 June 2009	1.81 m (5 ft 11 in)	(Mexico) Nuevo León
PG	13	Andrea López	17 – 13 April 2009	1.69 m (5 ft 7 in)	(Mexico) Guerrero
F	14	Yania Valverde	16 – 13 July 2009	1.78 m (5 ft 10 in)	(Mexico) Ciudad de México
PG	15	Isamar Rumbo	17 – 3 July 2009	1.66 m (5 ft 5 in)	(Mexico) Guerrero
F	28	Isabella Martínez	17 – 29 January 2009	1.73 m (5 ft 8 in)	(Mexico) Santos del Potosí
PF	33	Marisol Gómez	16 – 3 March 2010	1.81 m (5 ft 11 in)	(Mexico) Baja California
PF	40	Samantha Patiño	17 – 22 June 2009	1.80 m (5 ft 11 in)	(Mexico) Guerrero

Head coach

Juan López

Assistant coach(es)

Miguel Durán
Verónica Calvillo
Kiki Hernández

=== Spain ===
A 12-player squad was announced on 10 July 2026.

Spain women's national under-17 basketball team roster
Players
Coaches

Pos.	No.	Name	Age – Date of birth	Height	Club
PG	4	Paula Valenzuela	16 – 12 August 2009	1.72 m (5 ft 8 in)	(Spain) CB Nord Alcúdia
PG	5	Isabel Hernández	16 – 4 December 2009	1.73 m (5 ft 8 in)	(Spain) Valencia Basket
PG	6	Carla Cherry	17 – 14 May 2009	1.73 m (5 ft 8 in)	(France) UFAB 49
PG	8	Ona Ballesté	17 – 8 July 2009	1.73 m (5 ft 8 in)	(Spain) Wintym Femení Sant Adrià
PF	10	Sarai Teijeira	17 – 17 March 2009	1.89 m (6 ft 2 in)	(Spain) Valencia Basket
PG	11	Elia Pérez	17 – 24 February 2009	1.82 m (6 ft 0 in)	(Spain) Fundación CB Granada
PG	12	Trinity Ezeanatogu	17 – 12 March 2009	1.88 m (6 ft 2 in)	(Spain) CB Islas Canarias
C	14	Elizabeth Abubakar	16 – 1 December 2009	1.87 m (6 ft 2 in)	(Spain) CB Ciudad de Móstoles
PF	15	Amelia Alonso	16 – 21 January 2010	1.88 m (6 ft 2 in)	(Spain) Valencia Basket
SF	16	Ana Hernanz	17 – 18 June 2009	1.82 m (6 ft 0 in)	(Spain) Movistar Estudiantes
PF	17	Sandra Dávila	17 – 7 March 2009	1.91 m (6 ft 3 in)	(Spain) Valencia Basket
C	19	Ana Smykovskaia	17 – 10 January 2009	1.96 m (6 ft 5 in)	(Spain) Segle XXI

Head coach

Isabel Hernández

Assistant coach(es)

José Arnal
Jesús Garrido

== Group C ==
=== Colombia ===
A 12-player squad was announced on 6 July 2026.

Colombia women's national under-17 basketball team roster
Players
Coaches

Pos.	No.	Name	Age – Date of birth	Height	Club
SG	4	Alisson Restrepo	16 – 14 November 2009	1.68 m (5 ft 6 in)	(Colombia) Adida
SF	5	María Escorcia	16 – 6 October 2009	1.78 m (5 ft 10 in)	(Colombia) Adida
PF	7	Keren Bertel	16 – 15 October 2009	1.78 m (5 ft 10 in)	(Colombia) Guerreros de Barranquilla
G	8	María Superlano	15 – 5 April 2011	1.62 m (5 ft 4 in)	(Colombia) Halcones de la Candelaria
C	9	Hamileth Flórez	15 – 7 July 2011	1.92 m (6 ft 4 in)	(Colombia) ABA
C	18	Danna Zúñiga	15 – 14 May 2011	1.85 m (6 ft 1 in)	(Colombia) Club Panamericano
PF	22	Lía Murillo	15 – 15 January 2011	1.85 m (6 ft 1 in)	(Colombia) Leopardos
PF	24	Dayra Pedroza	15 – 2 January 2011	1.91 m (6 ft 3 in)	(Colombia) Cariocas
PG	27	Marta Serna	17 – 28 June 2009	1.81 m (5 ft 11 in)	(Colombia) REDI
PG	29	María Méndez	16 – 11 August 2009	1.74 m (5 ft 9 in)	(Colombia) Esganba
PG	30	Marilyn Millán	17 – 14 May 2009	1.78 m (5 ft 10 in)	(Colombia) Guerreros de Barranquilla
C	33	María Paz	15 – 2 October 2010	1.85 m (6 ft 1 in)	(Colombia) ABA

Head coach

Ricardo Pinzón

Assistant coach(es)

Luis Cuenca
María Palacio

=== Czech Republic ===
A 12-player squad was announced on 7 July 2026.

Czech Republic women's national under-17 basketball team roster
Players
Coaches

Pos.	No.	Name	Age – Date of birth	Height	Club
SF	2	Sofia Robson	17 – 28 April 2009	1.80 m (5 ft 11 in)	(Czech Republic) USK Praha
SG	4	Dominika Pencáková	17 – 20 May 2009	1.83 m (6 ft 0 in)	(Czech Republic) Sokol Hradec Králové
PF	6	Ema Nováková	17 – 24 January 2009	1.87 m (6 ft 2 in)	(Czech Republic) USK Praha
C	8	Ema Bartošová	17 – 25 June 2009	1.90 m (6 ft 3 in)	(Czech Republic) USK Praha
SF	9	Anežka Misíková	16 – 12 September 2009	1.78 m (5 ft 10 in)	(Czech Republic) USK Praha
PF	10	Tereza Sýkorová	16 – 30 July 2009	1.85 m (6 ft 1 in)	(Germany) TG Würzburg
PG	11	Linda Kotrčová	17 – 23 January 2009	1.75 m (5 ft 9 in)	(Czech Republic) BK Strakonice
SF	12	Martina Pařízková	17 – 10 March 2009	1.85 m (6 ft 1 in)	(Czech Republic) Žabiny Brno
PG	13	Vendula Saláková	16 – 13 January 2010	1.80 m (5 ft 11 in)	(Czech Republic) Sokol Hradec Králové
SF	17	Laura Marcolová	17 – 1 April 2009	1.75 m (5 ft 9 in)	(Czech Republic) BA Sparta
PF	18	Adéla Růžičková	16 – 29 March 2010	1.88 m (6 ft 2 in)	(Czech Republic) Žabiny Brno
C	21	Julie Přichystalová	17 – 27 April 2009	1.90 m (6 ft 3 in)	(Czech Republic) Sokol Hradec Králové

Head coach

Richard Fousek

Assistant coach(es)

Robert Landa
Barbora Holubová

=== Japan ===
A 12-player squad was announced on 30 June 2026.

Japan women's national under-17 basketball team roster
Players
Coaches

Pos.	No.	Name	Age – Date of birth	Height	Club
SF	6	Ran Kobayashi	17 – 27 April 2009	1.78 m (5 ft 10 in)	(Japan) Yokkaichi Maryknoll
C	7	Sora Shimizu	17 – 9 March 2009	1.83 m (6 ft 0 in)	(Japan) Kosei Gakuen Girls'
SF	11	Momoka Kaji	16 – 9 August 2009	1.73 m (5 ft 8 in)	(Japan) Ohka Gakuen
SG	13	Nene Gondo	17 – 31 March 2009	1.69 m (5 ft 7 in)	(Japan) St. Catalina Gakuen
PG	14	Kako Otsuki	16 – 14 October 2009	1.66 m (5 ft 5 in)	(Japan) Osaka Kunei Jogakuin
PG	15	Miya Takeuchi	17 – 22 January 2009	1.63 m (5 ft 4 in)	(Japan) Ohka Gakuen
PF	16	Rei Ando	17 – 24 February 2009	1.82 m (6 ft 0 in)	(Japan) Tottori Johoku
PF	20	Kiino Nazakawa	16 – 16 December 2009	1.80 m (5 ft 11 in)	(Japan) Showa Gakuen
PF	28	Kohse Hosozawa	17 – 25 January 2009	1.76 m (5 ft 9 in)	(Japan) Osaka Kunei Jogakuin
SF	31	Chihiro Ito	17 – 7 January 2009	1.74 m (5 ft 9 in)	(Japan) Yokkaichi Maryknoll
PG	48	Honoka Yasui	15 – 10 November 2010	1.70 m (5 ft 7 in)	(Japan) Yokkaichi Maryknoll
C	71	Aya Ishiwata	16 – 28 July 2009	1.88 m (6 ft 2 in)	(Japan) Kyoto Seika Gakuen

Head coach

Yoshikazu Suzuki

Assistant coach(es)

Ai Inagaki
Hinano Umetsu

=== Slovenia ===
A 12-player squad was announced on 9 July 2026.

Slovenia women's national under-17 basketball team roster
Players
Coaches

Pos.	No.	Name	Age – Date of birth	Height	Club
F	4	Zala Čanžek	17 – 3 March 2009	1.77 m (5 ft 10 in)	(Slovenia) KD Janina
SF	5	Julija Bukovec	17 – 30 March 2009	1.79 m (5 ft 10 in)	(Slovenia) Cinkarna Celje
PG	6	Ines Fritz	17 – 12 May 2009	1.80 m (5 ft 11 in)	(Slovenia) Cinkarna Celje
PG	7	Anais Gobec	15 – 4 June 2011	1.78 m (5 ft 10 in)	(Slovenia) ŽKD Maribor
PF	8	Ota Požin	16 – 9 December 2009	1.81 m (5 ft 11 in)	(Slovenia) Cinkarna Celje
PF	9	Ema Stavrov	16 – 31 August 2009	1.87 m (6 ft 2 in)	(Italy) Rhodigium Basket AD
SF	10	Marina Josipović	16 – 24 December 2009	1.87 m (6 ft 2 in)	(Slovenia) Škofja Loka
SG	11	Ema Kržišnik	16 – 27 August 2009	1.81 m (5 ft 11 in)	(Slovenia) Škofja Loka
C	12	Ema Lorbek	16 – 8 February 2010	1.94 m (6 ft 4 in)	(Spain) CB Santfeliuenc
PG	13	Hana Jerković	16 – 30 July 2009	1.77 m (5 ft 10 in)	(Slovenia) ŽKD Maribor
PF	14	Veronika Ferjančič	16 – 14 June 2010	1.91 m (6 ft 3 in)	(Slovenia) ŽKD Maribor
C	15	Zala Mali	17 – 18 January 2009	1.87 m (6 ft 2 in)	(Slovenia) Škofja Loka

Head coach

Robert Stojković

Assistant coach(es)

Aleksandar Ćikić
Maja Percan

== Group D ==
=== Canada ===
A 12-player squad was announced on 10 July 2026.

Canada women's national under-17 basketball team roster
Players
Coaches

Pos.	No.	Name	Age – Date of birth	Height	Club
PG	1	Lexi Wee	16 – 8 August 2009	1.66 m (5 ft 5 in)	(Canada) Niagara Prep
G	3	Jordyn Nohr	17 – 24 February 2009	1.75 m (5 ft 9 in)	(Canada) Brookswood Secondary School
G	7	Samera Jeffers	17 – 25 May 2009	1.79 m (5 ft 10 in)	(Canada) Lincoln Prep
G	8	Portia Reisen	16 – 10 February 2010	1.74 m (5 ft 9 in)	(Canada) Fort Erie International Academy
F	10	Ashley Vande Ven	17 – 21 February 2009	1.87 m (6 ft 2 in)	(Canada) Crestwood Preparatory College
PG	11	Pippa Gibb	16 – 8 January 2010	1.70 m (5 ft 7 in)	(Canada) Raymond High School
G	12	Avery Arije	17 – 12 February 2009	1.80 m (5 ft 11 in)	(Canada) Crestwood Preparatory College
F	13	Grace Pongang	17 – 19 April 2009	1.87 m (6 ft 2 in)	(Canada) Louis-Riel
F	15	Emerald Nnani	17 – 15 March 2009	1.86 m (6 ft 1 in)	(Canada) Royal Crown
F	17	Frances Vollett	16 – 10 September 2009	1.83 m (6 ft 0 in)	(Canada) Lincoln Prep
C	25	Sienna Morris	16 – 21 May 2010	1.99 m (6 ft 6 in)	(Canada) Royal Crown
C	34	Gabrielle Fajemirokun	15 – 8 May 2011	1.94 m (6 ft 4 in)	(Canada) Crestwood Preparatory College

Head coach

Jessica Roque

Assistant coach(es)

Robyn Fleckenstein
Hali Burns

=== Egypt ===
A 12-player squad was announced on 9 July 2026.

Egypt women's national under-17 basketball team roster
Players
Coaches

Pos.	No.	Name	Age – Date of birth	Height	Club
SF	7	Haya Hassabelnaby	17 – 2 April 2009	1.84 m (6 ft 0 in)	(Egypt) Smouha
PG	10	Dana Abdalaa	17 – 2 April 2009	1.74 m (5 ft 9 in)	(Egypt) Gezira
PG	11	Farida Abdella	16 – 2 January 2010	1.64 m (5 ft 5 in)	(Egypt) Misr Petrol
C	14	Jana Abdalla	17 – 14 January 2009	1.87 m (6 ft 2 in)	(Egypt) Smouha
PF	16	Malak Elshenawy	17 – 1 January 2009	1.85 m (6 ft 1 in)	(Egypt) Al Ahly
PF	21	Hana Fetet	16 – 1 May 2010	1.83 m (6 ft 0 in)	(Egypt) Sporting
SF	24	Jana Elsayed	17 – 13 April 2009	1.85 m (6 ft 1 in)	(Egypt) Smouha
SG	26	Hana Rizk	15 – 26 July 2010	1.73 m (5 ft 8 in)	(Egypt) Misr Petrol
SG	30	Laila Eissa	17 – 9 July 2009	1.75 m (5 ft 9 in)	(Egypt) Al Ahly
SG	32	Haya Soliman	15 – 23 November 2010	1.70 m (5 ft 7 in)	(Egypt) Sporting
PF	34	Zeina Amin	17 – 23 May 2009	1.92 m (6 ft 4 in)	(Egypt) Gezira
C	99	Salma Elshafey	16 – 11 November 2009	1.87 m (6 ft 2 in)	(Egypt) Al Ahly

Head coach

Mohamed Abdelrahman

Assistant coach(es)

Nehal Eldamhogy
Maged Salama

=== Italy ===
A 12-player squad was announced on 9 July 2026.

Italy women's national under-17 basketball team roster
Players
Coaches

Pos.	No.	Name	Age – Date of birth	Height	Club
G	7	Olivia Lelli	16 – 7 August 2009	1.70 m (5 ft 7 in)	(Italy) Basket Costa
C	8	Alessandra Padulo	17 – 12 May 2009	1.82 m (6 ft 0 in)	(Italy) Magnolia Campobasso
PG	9	Emilia Magni	17 – 17 January 2009	1.74 m (5 ft 9 in)	(Italy) Geas Basket
F	11	Isabel Hassan	17 – 14 June 2009	1.88 m (6 ft 2 in)	(Italy) Umana Reyer Venezia
PF	13	Sofia Zuccon	17 – 30 March 2009	1.85 m (6 ft 1 in)	(Italy) Umana Reyer Venezia
PG	15	Anna Sablich	17 – 7 July 2009	1.71 m (5 ft 7 in)	(Italy) Umana Reyer Venezia
G	16	Aisha Diagne	17 – 23 April 2009	1.65 m (5 ft 5 in)	(Italy) Basket Roma
F	17	Eleonora Tavella	16 – 22 July 2009	1.76 m (5 ft 9 in)	(Italy) Basket Costa
G	18	Martina Pasqualetti	17 – 29 May 2009	1.71 m (5 ft 7 in)	(Italy) Firenze Basketball Academy
C	20	Mariana Nako Moni	17 – 10 June 2009	1.91 m (6 ft 3 in)	(Italy) Vis Rosa Ferrara
F	24	Amelia Bianco Rossignoli	17 – 27 March 2009	1.76 m (5 ft 9 in)	(Italy) Umana Reyer Venezia
F	35	Susanna Perego	16 – 2 October 2009	1.85 m (6 ft 1 in)	(Italy) Basket Roma

Head coach

Maria Buzzanca

Assistant coach(es)

Andrea Maggi
Fabio Frignani

=== New Zealand ===
A 12-player squad was announced on 10 July 2026.

New Zealand women's national under-17 basketball team roster
Players
Coaches

Pos.	No.	Name	Age – Date of birth	Height	Club
G	3	Areta Kahura	16 – 26 February 2010	1.75 m (5 ft 9 in)	(New Zealand) Northern Kāhu
G	4	Charis Broughton	16 – 15 December 2009	1.69 m (5 ft 7 in)	(New Zealand) Tauranga Whai
F	5	Imani Rasmussen	16 – 21 October 2009	1.91 m (6 ft 3 in)	(New Zealand) North Harbour Basketball Association
F	7	Sinai Foai	17 – 30 January 2009	1.85 m (6 ft 1 in)	(Australia) Logan Thunder
G	8	Shamar Broughton	16 – 15 December 2009	1.72 m (5 ft 8 in)	(New Zealand) Tauranga Whai
F	11	Ava Jones	17 – 10 February 2009	1.88 m (6 ft 2 in)	(New Zealand) Mainland Pouākai
G	12	Elisa Brown	17 – 28 February 2009	1.72 m (5 ft 8 in)	(Australia) Casey Cavaliers
C	17	Emilia Ainley	16 – 13 January 2010	1.96 m (6 ft 5 in)	(New Zealand) Mainland Pouākai
F	18	Katie Moors	16 – 18 March 2010	1.87 m (6 ft 2 in)	(New Zealand) North Harbour Basketball Association
G	21	Sienna Maurice	16 – 13 January 2010	1.80 m (5 ft 11 in)	(New Zealand) Northern Kāhu
G	43	Madelin Eliadis	17 – 27 January 2009	1.70 m (5 ft 7 in)	(Australia) Melbourne Tigers
F	47	Nahala Toeleiu	16 – 27 March 2010	1.79 m (5 ft 10 in)	(New Zealand) Tokomanawa Queens

Head coach

Liam Connelly

Assistant coach(es)

Aled Jones
Darci Finnigan
