= 2026 FIBA Under-17 Women's Basketball World Cup =

International women's youth basketball championship

Mistrovství světa v basketbalu žen do 17 let 2026

Tournament details
- Host country: Czechia
- Dates: 11–19 July
- Teams: 16 (from 4 confederations)
- Venues: 2 (in 1 host city)

Final positions
- Champions: United States (7th title)
- Runners-up: Spain
- Third place: Australia
- Fourth place: Canada

Tournament statistics
- Games played: 54
- Attendance: 11,919 (221 per game)
- MVP: (United States) Ivanna Wilson Manyacka
- Top scorer: (China) Li Yuanshan (20.3 ppg)

Official website
- Website

The 2026 FIBA Under-17 Women's Basketball World Cup was the eighth edition of the FIBA Under-17 Women's Basketball World Cup, the biennial international women's youth basketball championship contested by the U17 national teams of the member associations of FIBA. It was held in Czechia from 11 to 19 July 2026. To be eligible for this competition, players must be born on or after 1 January 2009.

The United States won their fourth consecutive and seventh overall titles, after defeating Spain 82–73 in the final.

== Qualified teams ==
Means of qualification	Date(s)	Venue(s)	Berth(s)	Qualifiers
Host nation	—N/a		1	Czech Republic
2025 FIBA U16 Women's AmeriCup	16–22 June 2025	(Mexico) Irapuato	4	Canada; Colombia; Mexico; United States
2025 FIBA U16 Women's EuroBasket	15–23 August 2025	(Romania) Pitești	5	Germany; Italy; Latvia; Slovenia; Spain
2025 FIBA U16 Women's AfroBasket	2–14 September 2025	(Rwanda) Kigali	2	Egypt; Ivory Coast
2025 FIBA U16 Women's Asia Cup	22–28 September 2025	(Malaysia) Seremban	4	Australia; China; Japan; New Zealand
Total			16	

== Draw ==
The draw took place on 12 February 2026 in Brno.

=== Seeding ===
The seeding was announced on 10 February 2026.

Pot 1 Team Czech Republic United States Spain Canada	Pot 2 Team Australia Slovenia Germany New Zealand	Pot 3 Team Latvia Italy Japan China	Pot 4 Team Egypt Mexico Colombia Ivory Coast

== Referees ==
The following 28 referees were selected for the tournament.

- (Angola) Claudio Eiuba
- (Australia) Shannon Jennings
- (Australia) Travis Stewart
- (Brazil) Fernando Leite
- (Brazil) Larissa Rodrigues
- (Bulgaria) Ventsislav Velikov
- (Canada) Brooke Briscoe
- (Canada) Cooper Toppings
- (Chile) Claudio Osorio
- (France) Edgard Ceccarelli
- (France) Laure Coanus
- (Greece) Ioannis Tsimpouris
- (Jordan) Mohammad Taha
- (Kazakhstan) Alexey Stepanenko
- (Latvia) Elvis Binders-Čoders
- (Latvia) Ritvars Helmšteins
- (Lithuania) Juozas Barkauskas
- (Morocco) Imad Driouach
- (Mauritania) Oumar Sy
- (Mexico) Luis Escobedo
- (Norway) Viola Györgyi
- (Paraguay) Nicolás Flores
- (Poland) Ewa Matuszewska
- (Singapore) Leong Chuen Wing
- (Slovakia) Veronika Obertová
- (Spain) Sandra Sánchez
- (Syria) Wissam Zein
- (United States) Lauren Niemiera

== Preliminary round ==
All times are local (UTC+2).

=== Group A ===
Pos	Team	Pld	W	L	PF	PA	PD	Pts
1	United States	3	3	0	296	149	+147	6
2	Australia	3	2	1	237	176	+61	5
3	Latvia	3	1	2	187	225	−38	4
4	Ivory Coast	3	0	3	105	275	−170	3

Source: FIBA
Rules for classification: 1) Points; 2) Head-to-head results; 3) Points difference; 4) Points scored.

11 July 2026
11:30

Boxscore

Australia	76–65	Latvia
Scoring by quarter: 19–17, 21–18, 19–13, 17–17
Pts: Richardson, Ryan 14; Rebs: Trout 9 Asts: Ryan, Trout 4		Pts: Skrebele 18; Rebs: Šakalova 8 Asts: five players 2

Sportovní hala Vodova Hall 2, Brno
Attendance: 132
Referees: Cooper Toppings (CAN), Nicolás Flores (PAR), Laure Coanus (FRA)

11 July 2026
12:00

Boxscore

Ivory Coast	24–117	United States
Scoring by quarter: 8–25, 1–26, 6–37, 9–29
Pts: Diouf 11; Rebs: Keita, N'Dri 4 Asts: Konaté 3		Pts: Wilson Manyacka 21; Rebs: Bradley, Williams 10; Asts: Jones, Ojo 5

Sportovní hala Vodova Hall 1, Brno
Attendance: 83
Referees: Viola Györgyi (NOR), Larissa Rodrigues (BRA), Imad Driouach (MAR)

12 July 2026
19:45

Boxscore

Latvia	69–44	Ivory Coast
Scoring by quarter: 19–12, 14–12, 20–3, 16–17
Pts: Skrebele 26; Rebs: Tikmere 9 Asts: Lagunoviča 7		Pts: Diomande 16; Rebs: Keita 8 Asts: Koné, N'Dri 2

Sportovní hala Vodova Hall 2, Brno
Attendance: 78
Referees: Juozas Barkauskas (LTU), Mohammad Taha (JOR), Ioannis Tsimpouris (GRE)

12 July 2026
20:15

Boxscore

United States	74–72	Australia
Scoring by quarter: 22–23, 17–11, 19–16, 16–22
Pts: Bradley, Wilson Manyacka 14; Rebs: Wilson Manyacka 11; Asts: Jones 4		Pts: Smith 20; Rebs: Ryan 10; Asts: Sherrington, Trout 6

Sportovní hala Vodova Hall 1, Brno
Attendance: 314
Referees: Ventsislav Velikov (BUL), Veronika Obertová (SVK), Oumar Sy (MTN)

14 July 2026
14:45

Boxscore

Ivory Coast	37–89	Australia
Scoring by quarter: 7–30, 12–16, 8–23, 10–20
Pts: Diouf, Diomande 11; Rebs: Diomande 7 Asts: Konaté 3		Pts: Jones 15; Rebs: Manyok 11; Asts: Olechnowicz 7

Sportovní hala Vodova Hall 2, Brno
Attendance: 177
Referees: Edgard Ceccarelli (FRA), Wissam Zein (SYR), Luis Escobedo (MEX)

14 July 2026
14:45

Boxscore

Latvia	53–105	United States
Scoring by quarter: 14–29, 9–28, 14–29, 16–19
Pts: Skrebele 14; Rebs: Tikmere 9 Asts: Priedīte, Tikmere 3		Pts: Wilson Manyacka 16; Rebs: Griffin, Riak 9 Asts: Griffin 6

Sportovní hala Vodova Hall 1, Brno
Attendance: 162
Referees: Juozas Barkauskas (LTU), Brooke Briscoe (CAN), Sandra Sánchez (ESP)

=== Group B ===
Pos	Team	Pld	W	L	PF	PA	PD	Pts
1	Spain	3	3	0	213	116	+97	6
2	China	3	2	1	195	177	+18	5
3	Germany	3	1	2	155	187	−32	4
4	Mexico	3	0	3	133	216	−83	3

Source: FIBA
Rules for classification: 1) Points; 2) Head-to-head results; 3) Points difference; 4) Points scored.

11 July 2026
19:45

Boxscore

Mexico	51–80	China
Scoring by quarter: 11–19, 10–20, 22–14, 8–27
Pts: Velázquez 15; Rebs: Velázquez 8 Asts: Díaz 5		Pts: Li 24; Rebs: Pang 14; Asts: Li 6

Sportovní hala Vodova Hall 2, Brno
Attendance: 89
Referees: Edgard Ceccarelli (FRA), Elvis Binders-Čoders (LAT), Alexey Stepanenko (KAZ)

11 July 2026
20:15

Boxscore

Germany	40–66	Spain
Scoring by quarter: 5–20, 18–14, 10–17, 7–15
Pts: Schramm-Bunning 9 Rebs: Feunou 5 Asts: Pfanzelt 3		Pts: Hernández 18; Rebs: Ezeanatogu 10; Asts: Hernández, Hernánz 5

Sportovní hala Vodova Hall 1, Brno
Attendance: 163
Referees: Juozas Barkauskas (LTU), Veronika Obertová (SVK), Lauren Niemiera (USA)

12 July 2026
14:15

Boxscore

China	79–54	Germany
Scoring by quarter: 24–20, 23–14, 10–11, 22–9
Pts: Sun H. 26; Rebs: Pang 10; Asts: four players 4		Pts: Wiegand 16; Rebs: Haensch 4 Asts: Pfanzelt 6

Sportovní hala Vodova Hall 2, Brno
Attendance: 92
Referees: Cooper Toppings (CAN), Travis Stewart (AUS), Laure Coanus (FRA)

12 July 2026
14:45

Boxscore

Spain	75–40	Mexico
Scoring by quarter: 20–11, 14–10, 21–13, 20–6
Pts: Alonso 13; Rebs: Ezeanatogu, Smykovskaia 9 Asts: Ezeanatogu, Hernández 5		Pts: Velázquez 12; Rebs: Valverde 5 Asts: Velázquez 4

Sportovní hala Vodova Hall 1, Brno
Attendance: 158
Referees: Ritvars Helmšteins (LAT), Elvis Binders-Čoders (LAT), Brooke Briscoe (CAN)

14 July 2026
12:00

Boxscore

Germany	61–42	Mexico
Scoring by quarter: 15–16, 15–11, 11–7, 20–8
Pts: Zraychenko 15; Rebs: Askamp 15; Asts: Pfanzelt 7		Pts: Velázquez 21; Rebs: Valverde 7 Asts: Velázquez 6

Sportovní hala Vodova Hall 2, Brno
Attendance: 193
Referees: Fernando Leite (BRA), Nicolas Flores (PAR), Leong Chuen Wing (SGP)

14 July 2026
12:00

Boxscore

China	36–72	Spain
Scoring by quarter: 4–19, 9–12, 9–20, 14–21
Pts: Li, Feng 7 Rebs: Sun H. 8 Asts: Sun X. 5		Pts: Alonso 13; Rebs: Smykovskaia 10; Asts: Alonso, Hernández 4

Sportovní hala Vodova Hall 1, Brno
Attendance: 108
Referees: Martin Vulić (CRO), Silvia Marziali (ITA), Larissa Rodrigues (BRA)

=== Group C ===
Pos	Team	Pld	W	L	PF	PA	PD	Pts
1	Japan	3	3	0	228	156	+72	6
2	Slovenia	3	2	1	208	203	+5	5
3	Colombia	3	1	2	159	202	−43	4
4	Czech Republic	3	0	3	150	184	−34	3

Source: FIBA
Rules for classification: 1) Points; 2) Head-to-head results; 3) Points difference; 4) Points scored.

11 July 2026
17:00

Boxscore

Japan	70–48	Colombia
Scoring by quarter: 17–14, 21–12, 14–12, 18–10
Pts: Otsuki, Takeuchi 16; Rebs: Kobayashi 12; Asts: Takeuchi 7		Pts: Zuñiga 13; Rebs: Zuñiga 11; Asts: Serna 4

Sportovní hala Vodova Hall 2, Brno
Attendance: 95
Referees: Martin Vulić (CRO), Mohammad Taha (JOR), Brooke Briscoe (CAN)

11 July 2026
17:30

Boxscore

Czech Republic	55–63	Slovenia
Scoring by quarter: 11–21, 9–16, 12–14, 23–12
Pts: Pencáková 23; Rebs: Bartošová 9 Asts: Pencáková 4		Pts: Gobec 11; Rebs: Stavrov 8 Asts: Jerković 5

Sportovní hala Vodova Hall 1, Brno
Attendance: 712
Referees: Wissam Zein (SYR), Claudio Osorio (CHI), Travis Stewart (AUS)

12 July 2026
17:00

Boxscore

Slovenia	59–89	Japan
Scoring by quarter: 18–18, 18–25, 7–18, 16–28
Pts: Ferjančič 17; Rebs: Ferjančič 13; Asts: three players 3		Pts: Takeuchi 17; Rebs: Hosozawa 5 Asts: Takeuchi 5

Sportovní hala Vodova Hall 2, Brno
Attendance: 107
Referees: Edgard Ceccarelli (FRA), Silvia Marziali (ITA), Imad Driouach (MAR)

12 July 2026
17:30

Boxscore

Colombia	52–46	Czech Republic
Scoring by quarter: 6–14, 20–10, 16–10, 10–12
Pts: Bertel 15; Rebs: Zuñiga 13; Asts: Superlano 5		Pts: Pencáková 15; Rebs: Nováková 14; Asts: Pencáková 4

Sportovní hala Vodova Hall 1, Brno
Attendance: 596
Referees: Fernando Leite (BRA), Lauren Niemiera (USA), Sandra Sánchez (ESP)

14 July 2026
17:30

Boxscore

Japan	69–49	Czech Republic
Scoring by quarter: 16–15, 16–10, 14–17, 23–7
Pts: Kaji, Takeuchi 13; Rebs: Kobayashi 7 Asts: Takeuchi 4		Pts: Pencáková 12; Rebs: Robson 9 Asts: Pencáková 4

Sportovní hala Vodova Hall 1, Brno
Attendance: 668
Referees: Cooper Toppings (CAN), Ioannis Tsimpouris (GRE), Ewa Matuszewska (POL)

14 July 2026
17:30

Boxscore

Slovenia	86–59	Colombia
Scoring by quarter: 23–11, 25–16, 22–16, 16–16
Pts: Gobec 25; Rebs: Ferjančič 13; Asts: Gobec 7		Pts: Bertel, Superlano 13; Rebs: Escorcia 8 Asts: Serna, Superlano 3

Sportovní hala Vodova Hall 2, Brno
Attendance: 111
Referees: Viola Györgyi (NOR), Elvis Binders-Čoders (LAT), Alexey Stepanenko (KAZ)

=== Group D ===
Pos	Team	Pld	W	L	PF	PA	PD	Pts
1	Canada	3	3	0	230	186	+44	6
2	New Zealand	3	2	1	223	206	+17	5
3	Italy	3	1	2	170	186	−16	4
4	Egypt	3	0	3	170	215	−45	3

Source: FIBA
Rules for classification: 1) Points; 2) Head-to-head results; 3) Points difference; 4) Points scored.

11 July 2026
14:15

Boxscore

Egypt	65–79	New Zealand
Scoring by quarter: 17–27, 10–28, 24–10, 14–14
Pts: Abdella, Eissa 14; Rebs: Amin 8 Asts: Abdalaa, Amin 3		Pts: Broughton 18; Rebs: Rasmussen 11; Asts: Maurice 7

Sportovní hala Vodova Hall 2, Brno
Attendance: 126
Referees: Fernando Leite (BRA), Oumar Sy (MTN), Ioannis Tsimpouris (GRE)

11 July 2026
14:45

Boxscore

Italy	54–69	Canada
Scoring by quarter: 7–22, 14–7, 17–16, 16–24
Pts: Hassan 12; Rebs: Zuccon 14; Asts: six players 2		Pts: Arije 17; Rebs: Vollett 8 Asts: Nohr 5

Sportovní hala Vodova Hall 1, Brno
Attendance: 141
Referees: Ventsislav Velikov (BUL), Sandra Sánchez (ESP), Leong Chuen Wing (SGP)

12 July 2026
11:30

Boxscore

New Zealand	68–56	Italy
Scoring by quarter: 17–11, 20–14, 22–14, 9–17
Pts: Rasmussen 16; Rebs: Ainley 11; Asts: Maurice, Moors 4		Pts: Hassan 16; Rebs: Hassan, Zuccon 6 Asts: Hassan 4

Sportovní hala Vodova Hall 2, Brno
Attendance: 137
Referees: Martin Vulić (CRO), Larissa Rodrigues (BRA), Luis Escobedo (MEX)

12 July 2026
12:00

Boxscore

Canada	76–56	Egypt
Scoring by quarter: 26–12, 15–14, 21–16, 14–14
Pts: Arije 16; Rebs: Vande Ven 11; Asts: Arije, Wee 4		Pts: El-Sayed 13; Rebs: Abdalla, Abdella 5 Asts: five players 2

Sportovní hala Vodova Hall 1, Brno
Attendance: 194
Referees: Viola Györgyi (NOR), Nicolás Flores (PAR), Ewa Matuszewska (POL)

14 July 2026
20:15

Boxscore

Egypt	49–60	Italy
Scoring by quarter: 11–14, 19–14, 9–16, 10–16
Pts: Eissa 17; Rebs: Eissa, El-Shenawy 7 Asts: El-Sayed 5		Pts: Hassan 17; Rebs: Hassan 13; Asts: Diagne 3

Sportovní hala Vodova Hall 2, Brno
Attendance: 75
Referees: Ventsislav Velikov (BUL), Travis Stewart (AUS), Laure Coanus (FRA)

14 July 2026
20:15

Boxscore

Canada	85–76	New Zealand
Scoring by quarter: 14–17, 26–11, 24–27, 21–21
Pts: Reisen 24; Rebs: Nnani 12; Asts: Wee 5		Pts: Rasmussen 14; Rebs: Ainley 8 Asts: C. Broughton, S. Broughton 5

Sportovní hala Vodova Hall 1, Brno
Attendance: 151
Referees: Ritvars Helmšteins (LAT), Lauren Niemiera (USA), Claudio Osorio (CHI)

== Final round ==
=== Bracket ===
Round of 16
15 July
United States	112
Mexico	36
15 July
Slovenia	66
Italy	44
15 July
Latvia	60
China	83
15 July
Czech Republic	40
Canada	67
15 July
Australia	71
Germany	45
15 July
Japan	80
Egypt	53
15 July
Ivory Coast	33
Spain	87
15 July
Colombia	40
New Zealand	60

Quarter-finals
17 July
United States	77
Slovenia	57
17 July
China	68
Canada	69
17 July
Australia	70
Japan	64
17 July
Spain	84
New Zealand	55

Semi-finals
18 July
United States	86
Canada	60
18 July
Australia	51
Spain	58

Final
19 July
United States	82
Spain	73
Third place
19 July
Canada	57
Australia	64

=== Round of 16 ===
15 July 2026
11:30

Boxscore

Australia	71–45	Germany
Scoring by quarter: 27–3, 14–11, 22–7, 8–24
Pts: Ryan 16; Rebs: Trout 7 Asts: Smith 4		Pts: Zraychenko 11; Rebs: Pfanzelt 9 Asts: Pfanzelt 5

Sportovní hala Vodova Hall 2, Brno
Attendance: 147
Referees: Cooper Toppings (CAN), Elvis Binders-Čoders (LAT), Laure Coanus (FRA)

15 July 2026
12:00

Boxscore

Ivory Coast	33–87	Spain
Scoring by quarter: 8–21, 9–23, 7–34, 9–9
Pts: Diouf, Diomande 10; Rebs: Diarisso 4 Asts: Konaté, N'dri 2		Pts: Alonso 20; Rebs: Smykovskaia 8 Asts: Hernández 7

Sportovní hala Vodova Hall 1, Brno
Attendance: 99
Referees: Fernando Leite (BRA), Brooke Briscoe (CAN), Oumar Sy (MTN)

15 July 2026
14:15

Boxscore

Latvia	60–83	China
Scoring by quarter: 19–20, 14–27, 9–23, 18–13
Pts: Naidjonova 15; Rebs: three players 4 Asts: Priedīte 5		Pts: Li 28; Rebs: Pang 15; Asts: Sun X. 9

Sportovní hala Vodova Hall 2, Brno
Attendance: 66
Referees: Ventsislav Velikov (BUL), Sandra Sánchez (ESP), Nicolás Flores (PAR)

15 July 2026
14:45

Boxscore

United States	112–36	Mexico
Scoring by quarter: 24–7, 28–9, 30–10, 30–10
Pts: Griffin 17; Rebs: Williams 15; Asts: Reckley 9		Pts: Díaz 14; Rebs: Olalde 7 Asts: Velázquez 3

Sportovní hala Vodova Hall 1, Brno
Attendance: 105
Referees: Viola Györgyi (NOR), Mohammad Taha (JOR), Ioannis Tsimpouris (GRE)

15 July 2026
17:00

Boxscore

Colombia	40–60	New Zealand
Scoring by quarter: 10–24, 9–18, 5–15, 16–3
Pts: Zuñiga 12; Rebs: Zuñiga 9 Asts: Bertel 3		Pts: Ainley 13; Rebs: Moors 11; Asts: S. Broughton, Brown 3

Sportovní hala Vodova Hall 2, Brno
Attendance: 81
Referees: Juozas Barkauskas (LTU), Silvia Marziali (ITA), Luis Escobedo (MEX)

15 July 2026
17:30

Boxscore

Czech Republic	40–67	Canada
Scoring by quarter: 11–13, 10–16, 15–19, 4–19
Pts: Pencáková 10; Rebs: Nováková, Přichystalová 6 Asts: Sýkorová 4		Pts: Arije, Vollett 13; Rebs: Vande Ven 14; Asts: Reisen 5

Sportovní hala Vodova Hall 1, Brno
Attendance: 504
Referees: Martin Vulić (CRO), Travis Stewart (AUS), Larissa Rodrigues (BRA)

15 July 2026
19:45

Boxscore

Slovenia	66–44	Italy
Scoring by quarter: 21–16, 16–5, 16–11, 13–12
Pts: Gobec 16; Rebs: Ferjančič 13; Asts: Gobec 4		Pts: Magni 16; Rebs: Hassan, Zuccon 11; Asts: Hassan, Lelli 3

Sportovní hala Vodova Hall 2, Brno
Attendance: 122
Referees: Edgard Ceccarelli (FRA), Wissam Zein (SYR), Imad Driouach (MAR)

15 July 2026
20:15

Boxscore

Japan	80–53	Egypt
Scoring by quarter: 25–15, 27–15, 18–9, 10–14
Pts: Otsuki 19; Rebs: Otsuki 7 Asts: Otsuki 4		Pts: three players 11; Rebs: Amin 11; Asts: El-Sayed 4

Sportovní hala Vodova Hall 1, Brno
Attendance: 70
Referees: Ritvars Helmšteins (LAT), Veronika Obertová (SVK), Lauren Niemiera (USA)

=== 9–16th classification playoffs ===
Classification quarterfinals
17 July
Mexico	62
Italy	72
17 July
Latvia	72
Czech Republic	59
17 July
Germany	54
Egypt	58
17 July
Ivory Coast	51
Colombia	66

Classification semifinals
18 July
Italy	63
Latvia	59
18 July
Egypt	72
Colombia	36

Ninth place match
19 July
Italy	63
Egypt	80
Eleventh place match
19 July
Latvia	60
Colombia	46

Classification semifinals
18 July
Mexico	66
Czech Republic	74
18 July
Germany	80
Ivory Coast	47

13th place match
19 July
Czech Republic	37
Germany	63
15th place match
19 July
Mexico	88
Ivory Coast	72

==== 9–16th place quarterfinals ====
17 July 2026
11:30

Boxscore

Ivory Coast	51–66	Colombia
Scoring by quarter: 14–20, 13–15, 11–14, 13–17
Pts: Diouf 20; Rebs: Diomande 7 Asts: Konaté 4		Pts: Escorcia, Zuñiga 14; Rebs: Paz 14; Asts: Serna 7

Sportovní hala Vodova Hall 2, Brno
Attendance: 52
Referees: Viola Györgyi (NOR), Lauren Niemiera (USA), Oumar Sy (MTN)

17 July 2026
14:15

Boxscore

Germany	54–58	Egypt
Scoring by quarter: 12–20, 10–11, 21–16, 11–16
Pts: Zraychenko 15; Rebs: Wiegand 7 Asts: Pfanzelt 5		Pts: three players 12; Rebs: Amin 9 Asts: Abdella 5

Sportovní hala Vodova Hall 2, Brno
Attendance: 109
Referees: Juozas Barkauskas (LTU), Brooke Briscoe (CAN), Alexey Stepanenko (KAZ)

17 July 2026
17:00

Boxscore

Latvia	72–59	Czech Republic
Scoring by quarter: 22–7, 16–16, 16–16, 18–20
Pts: Sirsniņa 20; Rebs: Arsentjeva 8 Asts: Skrebele 3		Pts: Sýkorová 9 Rebs: Robson 7 Asts: Salaková 3

Sportovní hala Vodova Hall 2, Brno
Attendance: 447
Referees: Cooper Toppings (CAN), Fernando Leite (BRA), Laure Coanus (FRA)

17 July 2026
19:45

Boxscore

Mexico	62–72	Italy
Scoring by quarter: 16–19, 15–11, 16–21, 15–21
Pts: Velázquez 28; Rebs: Velázquez 8 Asts: three players 4		Pts: Magni, Zuccon 16; Rebs: Zuccon 21; Asts: Sablich 8

Sportovní hala Vodova Hall 2, Brno
Attendance: 118
Referees: Travis Stewart (AUS), Sandra Sánchez (ESP), Leong Chuen Wing (SGP)

==== 13–16th place semifinals ====
18 July 2026
11:30

Boxscore

Germany	80–47	Ivory Coast
Scoring by quarter: 23–8, 23–11, 25–6, 9–22
Pts: Wiegand 20; Rebs: Feunou Bakam 9 Asts: Wiegand 5		Pts: Diomande 19; Rebs: Diomande 6 Asts: Konaté, Koné 3

Sportovní hala Vodova Hall 2, Brno
Attendance: 95
Referees: Travis Stewart (AUS), Leong Chuen Wing (SGP), Claudio Osorio (CHI)

18 July 2026
17:00

Boxscore

Mexico	66–74	Czech Republic
Scoring by quarter: 13–21, 15–26, 18–11, 20–16
Pts: Velázquez 15; Rebs: Díaz, Valverde 6 Asts: Velázquez 9		Pts: Pencáková 24; Rebs: four players 7 Asts: Sýkorová 5

Sportovní hala Vodova Hall 2, Brno
Attendance: 585
Referees: Viola Györgyi (NOR), Nicolás Flores (PAR), Imad Driouach (MAR)

==== 15th place game ====
19 July 2026
10:30

Boxscore

Mexico	88–72	Ivory Coast
Scoring by quarter: 17–26, 18–9, 24–16, 29–21
Pts: Díaz, Martínez 19; Rebs: Díaz 8 Asts: Valverde 7		Pts: Diouf 29; Rebs: Koné 5 Asts: Koné 5

Sportovní hala Vodova Hall 2, Brno
Attendance: 84
Referees: Wissam Zein (SYR), Ewa Matuszewska (POL), Silvia Marziali (ITA)

==== 13th place game ====
19 July 2026
18:00

Boxscore

Czech Republic	37–63	Germany
Scoring by quarter: 1–22, 12–13, 11–13, 13–15
Pts: Kotrčová 10; Rebs: Nováková 9 Asts: Pencáková 3		Pts: Wiegand 23; Rebs: Askamp 11; Asts: Wiegand 6

Sportovní hala Vodova Hall 2, Brno
Attendance: 493
Referees: Juozas Barkauskas (LTU), Oumar Sy (MTN), Ioannis Tsimpouris (GRE)

==== 9–12th place semifinals ====
18 July 2026
14:15

Boxscore

Italy	63–59	Latvia
Scoring by quarter: 11–17, 15–13, 17–14, 20–15
Pts: Hassan 18; Rebs: Zuccon 17; Asts: Diagne, Hassan 3		Pts: Arsentjeva 11; Rebs: Arsentjeva 8 Asts: Naidjonova 5

Sportovní hala Vodova Hall 2, Brno
Attendance: 93
Referees: Edgard Ceccarelli (FRA), Lauren Niemiera (USA), Mohammad Taha (JOR)

18 July 2026
19:45

Boxscore

Egypt	72–36	Colombia
Scoring by quarter: 23–7, 21–8, 15–12, 13–9
Pts: Hassabelnaby 13; Rebs: Rizk 8 Asts: Eissa 8		Pts: Bertel 8 Rebs: Zuñiga 9 Asts: Serna 3

Sportovní hala Vodova Hall 2, Brno
Attendance: 49
Referees: Cooper Toppings (CAN), Wissam Zein (SYR), Ewa Matuszewska (POL)

==== Eleventh place game ====
19 July 2026
13:00

Boxscore

Latvia	60–46	Colombia
Scoring by quarter: 18–14, 16–18, 9–14, 17–10
Pts: Sirsniņa 17; Rebs: Lagunoviča 7 Asts: Skrebele 5		Pts: Bertel 12; Rebs: Murillo 8 Asts: Bertel 5

Sportovní hala Vodova Hall 2, Brno
Attendance: 94
Referees: Viola Györgyi (NOR), Leong Chuen Wing (SGP), Alexey Stepanenko (KAZ)

==== Ninth place game ====
19 July 2026
15:30

Boxscore

Italy	63–80	Egypt
Scoring by quarter: 17–20, 17–24, 19–14, 10–22
Pts: Nako 14; Rebs: Hassan 9 Asts: Diagne, Hassan 5		Pts: Hassabelnaby 25; Rebs: Amin 8 Asts: Eissa 6

Sportovní hala Vodova Hall 2, Brno
Attendance: 170
Referees: Fernando Leite (BRA), Mohammad Taha (JOR), Luis Escobedo (MEX)

=== Quarterfinals ===
17 July 2026
12:00

Boxscore

Australia	70–64	Japan
Scoring by quarter: 19–14, 17–14, 19–21, 15–15
Pts: Ryan 21; Rebs: Trout 14; Asts: Trout 4		Pts: Takeuchi 32; Rebs: Hosozawa 6 Asts: Takeuchi 3

Sportovní hala Vodova Hall 1, Brno
Attendance: 263
Referees: Edgard Ceccarelli (FRA), Wissam Zein (SYR), Silvia Marziali (ITA)

17 July 2026
14:45

Boxscore

Spain	84–55	New Zealand
Scoring by quarter: 20–11, 21–19, 24–16, 19–9
Pts: Hernández 25; Rebs: Alonso 13; Asts: Balleste, Valenzuela 4		Pts: Ainley 13; Rebs: Ainley 10; Asts: Maurice 7

Sportovní hala Vodova Hall 1, Brno
Attendance: 199
Referees: Ventsislav Velikov (BUL), Veronika Obertová (SVK), Larissa Rodrigues (BRA)

17 July 2026
17:30

Boxscore

China	68–69	Canada
Scoring by quarter: 15–13, 15–16, 17–27, 21–13
Pts: Li 17; Rebs: Pang 10; Asts: Sun X. 10		Pts: Vollett 19; Rebs: Nnani, Vande Ven 10; Asts: Arije 4

Sportovní hala Vodova Hall 1, Brno
Attendance: 224
Referees: Martin Vulić (CRO), Elvis Binders-Čoders (LAT), Ioannis Tsimpouris (GRE)

17 July 2026
20:15

Boxscore

United States	77–57	Slovenia
Scoring by quarter: 16–23, 20–8, 25–11, 16–15
Pts: three players 14; Rebs: Ojo 9 Asts: Reckley 6		Pts: Gobec 12; Rebs: Ferjančič, Stavrov 7 Asts: Fritz 6

Sportovní hala Vodova Hall 1, Brno
Attendance: 236
Referees: Ritvars Helmšteins (LAT), Ewa Matuszewska (POL), Claudio Osorio (CHI)

=== 5–8th classification playoffs ===
Classification semifinals
18 July
Slovenia	71
China	73
18 July
Japan	52
New Zealand	77

Fifth place match
19 July
China	61
New Zealand	76
Seventh place match
19 July
Slovenia	45
Japan	54

==== 5–8th place semifinals ====
18 July 2026
12:00

Boxscore

Japan	52–77	New Zealand
Scoring by quarter: 8–17, 12–14, 14–21, 18–25
Pts: Otsuki 14; Rebs: Kobayashi 5 Asts: Takeuchi 7		Pts: C. Broughton 19; Rebs: Rasmussen 10; Asts: C. Broughton, Maurice 6

Sportovní hala Vodova Hall 1, Brno
Attendance: 172
Referees: Ritvars Helmšteins (LAT), Brooke Briscoe (CAN), Larissa Rodrigues (BRA)

18 July 2026
14:45

Boxscore

Slovenia	71–73	China
Scoring by quarter: 17–21, 17–19, 23–18, 14–15
Pts: Jerković 21; Rebs: Ferjančič 13; Asts: Požin 5		Pts: Li 30; Rebs: Pang, Sun H. 7 Asts: Sun X. 6

Sportovní hala Vodova Hall 1, Brno
Attendance: 168
Referees: Juozas Barkauskas (LTU), Sandra Sánchez (ESP), Luis Escobedo (MEX)

==== Seventh place game ====
19 July 2026
11:30

Boxscore

Slovenia	45–54	Japan
Scoring by quarter: 9–8, 15–16, 15–16, 6–14
Pts: Gobec 12; Rebs: Ferjančič 10; Asts: Gobec 4		Pts: Takeuchi 19; Rebs: Otsuki 8 Asts: Takeuchi 5

Sportovní hala Vodova Hall 1, Brno
Attendance: 214
Referees: Elvis Binders-Čoders (LAT), Lauren Niemiera (USA), Larissa Rodrigues (BRA)

==== Fifth place game ====
19 July 2026
14:15

Boxscore

China	61–76	New Zealand
Scoring by quarter: 7–12, 14–22, 19–25, 21–17
Pts: Sun H. 14; Rebs: Pang 9 Asts: Sun X. 10		Pts: Ainley 20; Rebs: Ainley 18; Asts: S. Broughton 6

Sportovní hala Vodova Hall 1, Brno
Attendance: 129
Referees: Ventsislav Velikov (BUL), Brooke Briscoe (CAN), Veronika Obertová (SVK)

=== Semifinals ===
18 July 2026
17:45

Boxscore

Australia	51–58	Spain
Scoring by quarter: 10–18, 13–14, 13–8, 15–18
Pts: Ryan 12; Rebs: Ryan 9 Asts: Jones, Ryan 4		Pts: Hernández 13; Rebs: Hernánz 9 Asts: Hernández 5

Sportovní hala Vodova Hall 1, Brno
Attendance: 515
Referees: Martin Vulić (CRO), Elvis Binders-Čoders (LAT), Laure Coanus (FRA)

18 July 2026
20:45

Boxscore

United States	86–60	Canada
Scoring by quarter: 23–26, 25–7, 22–10, 16−17
Pts: Long 15; Rebs: Williams 11; Asts: Reckley 7		Pts: Arije, Vollett 12; Rebs: Vande Ven 7 Asts: Wee 4

Sportovní hala Vodova Hall 1, Brno
Attendance: 338
Referees: Ventsislav Velikov (BUL), Fernando Leite (BRA), Veronika Obertová (SVK)

=== Third place game ===
19 July 2026
17:15

Boxscore

Canada	57–64	Australia
Scoring by quarter: 10–14, 13–17, 20–12, 14–21
Pts: Vande Ven 20; Rebs: Pongang 11; Asts: Reisen 5		Pts: Ryan 15; Rebs: Ryan, Trout 8 Asts: Ryan 4

Sportovní hala Vodova Hall 1, Brno
Attendance: 381
Referees: Edgard Ceccarelli (FRA), Ritvars Helmšteins (LAT), Sandra Sánchez (ESP)

=== Final ===
19 July 2026
20:15

Boxscore

United States	82–73	Spain
Scoring by quarter: 27–23, 14–16, 20–19, 21–15
Pts: Ojo 20; Rebs: Williams, Wilson Manyacka 10; Asts: Reckley 5		Pts: Hernández; Rebs: Alonso 11; Asts: Hernández, Smykovskaia 4

Sportovní hala Vodova Hall 1, Brno
Attendance: 1,128
Referees: Martin Vulić (CRO), Cooper Toppings (CAN), Laure Coanus (FRA)

== Final standings ==
Rank	Team	Record
1st place, gold medalist(s)	United States	7–0
2nd place, silver medalist(s)	Spain	6–1
3rd place, bronze medalist(s)	Australia	5–2
4th	Canada	5–2
5th	New Zealand	5–2
6th	China	4–3
7th	Japan	5–2
8th	Slovenia	3–4
9th	Egypt	3–4
10th	Italy	3–4
11th	Latvia	3–4
12th	Colombia	2–5
13th	Germany	3–4
14th	Czech Republic	1–6
15th	Mexico	1–6
16th	Ivory Coast	0–7

== Statistics and awards ==
=== Statistical leaders ===
==== Players ====
Points

Name	PPG
(China) Li Yuanshan	20.3
(Japan) Miya Takeuchi	18.1
(Spain) Isabel Hernández	17.0
(Mexico) Jimena Velázquez	16.7
(Ivory Coast) Fatima Diouf	15.0
(China) Sun Hanyun	15.0

Rebounds

Name	RPG
(Italy) Sofia Zuccon	11.7
(Slovenia) Veronika Ferjančič	10.7
(New Zealand) Emilia Ainley	10.3
(China) Pang Yunshu	9.7
(United States) Nation Williams	9.1

Assists

Name	APG
(China) Sun Xuan	6.7
(Mexico) Jimena Velázquez	5.1
(United States) Morghan Reckley	5.0
(Japan) Miya Takeuchi	4.9
(Spain) Isabel Hernández	4.7

Blocks

Name	BPG
(Australia) Jemyma Manyok	2.3
(Slovenia) Veronika Ferjančič	2.3
(United States) Nation Williams	1.9
(Egypt) Zeina Amin	1.6
(United States) Micah Ojo	1.4
(China) Grace Pongang	1.4

Steals

Name	SPG
(Spain) Isabel Hernández	3.9
(Australia) Olivia Olechnowicz	3.3
(Mexico) Jimena Velázquez	3.0
(United States) Nation Williams	2.7
(United States) Ivanna Wilson Manyacka	2.6

Efficiency

Name	EFFPG
(Japan) Miya Takeuchi	18.6
(New Zealand) Emilia Ainley	18.0
(Slovenia) Anais Gobec	18.0
(United States) Ivanna Wilson Manyacka	17.0
(United States) Micah Ojo	17.0

==== Teams ====
Points

Team	PPG
United States	93.3
Spain	73.6
Australia	70.4
New Zealand	70.1
China	69.0

Rebounds

Team	RPG
United States	54.1
Spain	53.9
New Zealand	52.9
Canada	49.6
Czech Republic	47.4

Assists

Team	APG
United States	23.0
New Zealand	20.9
Spain	20.6
Australia	19.1
China	18.6

Blocks

Team	BPG
United States	7.3
Australia	6.4
Canada	5.7
Colombia	5.6
Germany	5.6

Steals

Team	SPG
Spain	16.7
United States	15.6
Ivory Coast	12.4
Czech Republic	12.3
Mexico	11.3

Efficiency

Team	EFFPG
United States	124.0
Australia	86.6
Spain	85.0
New Zealand	78.9
Canada	76.1

=== Awards ===
The awards were announced on 5 July 2026.

All-Star Five
Guards	Forwards	Center
(Spain) Isabel Hernández (Japan) Miya Takeuchi	(United States) Ivanna Wilson Manyacka (Australia) Madison Ryan (Canada) Frances Vollett	N/A
MVP: (United States) Ivanna Wilson Manyacka
All-Second Team
Guards	Forwards	Center
(Australia) Olivia Olechnowicz (Slovenia) Anais Gobec	(United States) Micah Ojo (China) Li Yuanshan (Spain) Amelia Alonso	N/A
Best defensive player: (Australia) Olivia Olechnowicz
Best coach: (Spain) Isabel Fernández
