= Ivanna Wilson Manyacka =

American basketball player (born 2009

No. 2 – Bullis Bulldogs
- Position: Forward

Personal information
- Born: May 26, 2009 (age 17)
- Listed height: 6 ft 1 in (1.85 m)

Career information
- High school: Bullis School (Potomac, Maryland)

Career highlights
- FIBA Under-17 Women's World Cup MVP (2026); FIBA Under-16 Women's AmeriCup MVP (2025)
Medals
Representing the United States
Women's basketball
FIBA Under-17 World Cup
Gold medal – first place	2024 Mexico	Team
Gold medal – first place	2026 Czech Republic	Team
FIBA Under-16 Women's AmeriCup
Gold medal – first place	2025 Mexico	Team

Ivanna Wilson Manyacka (born May 26, 2009) is an American high school basketball player who attends Bullis School in Potomac, Maryland. She is a consensus five-star recruit and one of the top-ranked players in the 2027 class.

== Early life ==
Wilson Manyacka is the third of five siblings, and grew up in Gaithersburg, Maryland. Her father, who immigrated from Cameroon, was a soccer player who said he "[didn't] know much about basketball". Wilson Manyacka discovered basketball while at school in the first grade. "Playing [and competing] against the boys made me like the game more and want to get better at it," she said. Wilson Manyacka asked for a ball for Christmas and practiced her dribbling in the house's basement. She joined her first travel team at age 10 and later joined Team Final, a travel team competing in the shoe-sponsored tournaments.

Wilson Manyacka attended Monocacy Middle School in Frederick, Maryland, and excelled on the school's basketball team. She also played with a high-level travel team called Team Final and often competed against older players. Despite living in Frederick by this time, Wilson Manyacka chose to attend Bullis School in Potomac, Maryland, located 33 mi (53 km) away, to play high school basketball. She initially transferred to Bullis as an eighth grader and played on the junior varsity team that year, scoring 47 points in one game.

== High school career ==
As a freshman at Bullis School, Wilson Manyacka averaged 15.6 points and 10.3 rebounds per game. The Bullis Bulldogs advanced to the finals of both the Independent School League (ISL) and Maryland Private School State Basketball Tournament (MPSSBT), though they lost both times. As a sophomore, Wilson Manyacka averaged 18.5 points and 11.2 rebounds per game and helped the Bulldogs reach the finals of the ISL and semifinals of the MPSSBT. She was named the Maryland Gatorade Player of the Year and the MaxPreps Maryland Player of the Year, and earned third-team All-American honors from MaxPreps, Naismith, and The Sporting News.

As a junior, Wilson Manyacka averaged 20.7 points (Note: Alternatively reported as 21.2 points.) and 11.5 rebounds per game. She helped the Bulldogs win the MPSSBT, recording eight points, 14 rebounds, six steals, and four blocks in a 62–50 win over Bishop McNamara High School in the final. Wilson Manyacka also guided the team to the Chipotle Nationals championship game, scoring a team-high 11 points in a defeat to DME Academy. She repeated as both the Maryland Gatorade Player of the Year and the MaxPreps Maryland Player of the Year, and earned first-team All-American honors from MaxPreps, Naismith, and The Sporting News.

Outside of school, Wilson Manyacka joined the West Virginia Thunder of the Under Armour Association (UAA) circuit in 2024. She helped them win the 2025 Girls' UAA U17 championship.

=== Recruiting ===
Wilson Manyacka is a consensus five-star recruit and one of the top players in the 2027 class, according to major recruiting services. A highly touted freshman, she had 40 NCAA Division I offers before the start of her sophomore year.

== National team career ==
Wilson Manyacka represented the United States at the 2024 FIBA Under-17 Women's World Cup in Mexico and won a gold medal. She averaged 7.9 points and 4.9 rebounds per game in limited minutes. Wilson Manyacka scored a game-high 21 points in a 123–42 group stage win over Croatia. She was the youngest member of the squad, turning 15 years old on the day she learned she was selected to the roster.

The following year, Wilson Manyacka represented the United States at the 2025 FIBA U16 Women's AmeriCup and won another gold medal. She finished as the tournament's leading scorer with an average of 18 points to go along with 7.2 rebounds and 3.8 steals per game. Wilson Manyacka posted 14 points, 11 rebounds, and four blocks in an 85–59 win over Canada in the final. She was subsequently named the tournament MVP.

== Personal life ==
Wilson Manyacka was born to Cameroonian parents.
