= Ohkagakuen University =

- 桜花学園大学
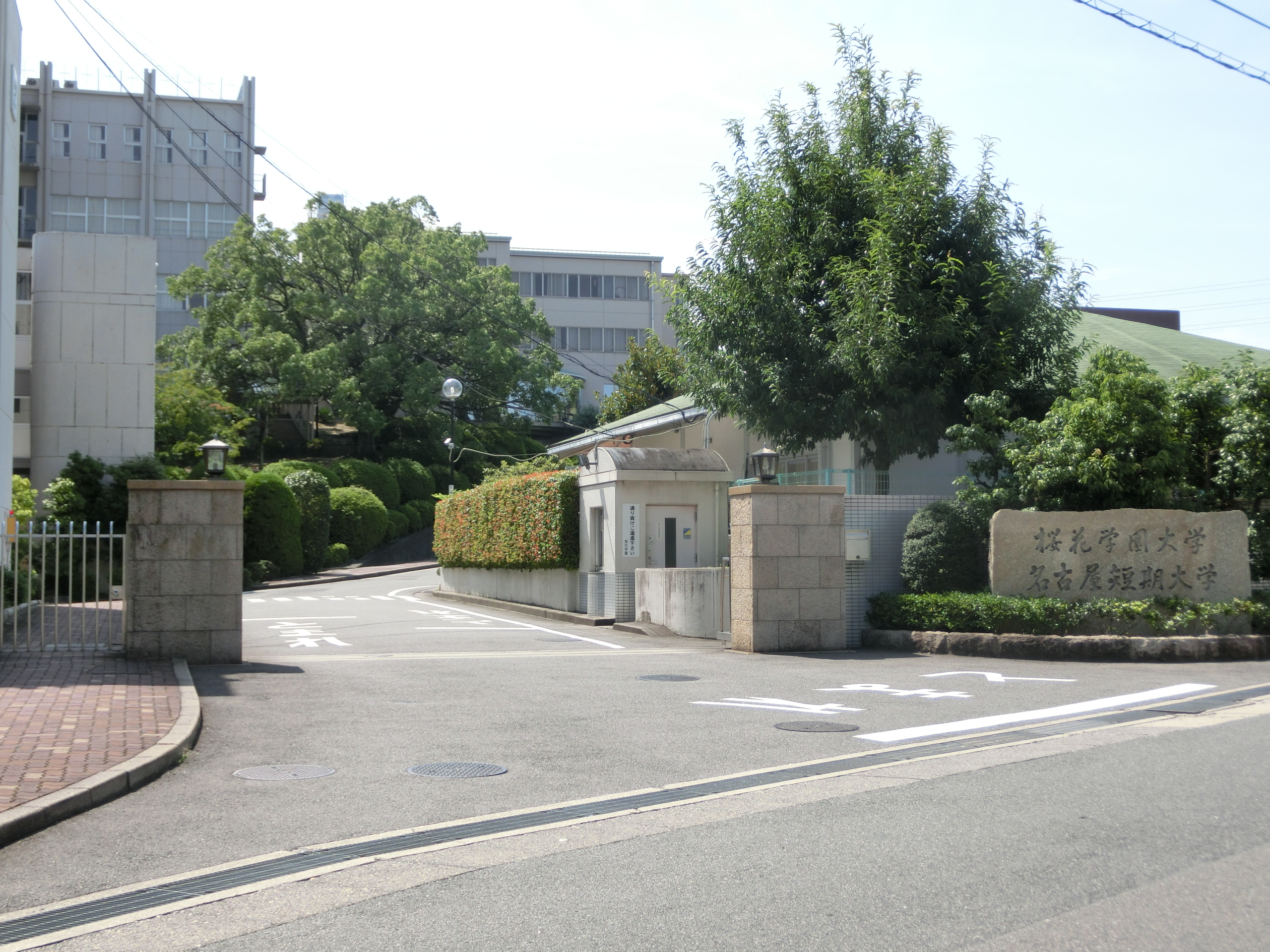
- Ohkagakuen University, Toyoake campus
- Type: Private; Women's college
- Established: 1903
- Location: Toyoake, Aichi; Toyota, Aichi, Japan; 35.0599°N 136.9753°E (Nagoya Campus); 35.0977°N 137.1129°E (Toyota Campus)
- Campus: Multiple campuses
- Website: www.ohkagakuen-u.ac.jp (in Japanese)

Ohkagakuen University (桜花学園大学, Ōka gakuen daigaku) is a women's private university headquartered in Toyoake, Aichi, Japan, with its so-called Nagoya Campus there. There is another campus in Toyota, Aichi. The school was established in 1990 as a junior college and then became a four-year college in 1998. The earliest predecessor was a nursing school established in 1903, which became a girls' high school in 1923, which continues to operate today.
