= Micah Ojo =

American basketball player (born 2009)

Princess Anne
- Position: Forward

Personal information
- Born: October 30, 2009 (age 17)
- Listed height: 6 ft 1 in (1.85 m)

Career information
- High school: Princess Anne (Virginia Beach, Virginia)
- College: North Carolina (commit)
Medals
Women's basketball
Representing United States
FIBA Under-17 World Cup
Gold medal – first place	2026 Czech Republic	Team
FIBA Under-16 Women's AmeriCup
Gold medal – first place	2025 Mexico	Team

Micah Ojo (born October 30, 2009) is an American basketball player who attends Princess Anne High School. She is a five-star recruit and one of the top players in the 2027 class.

== High school career ==
Ojo attends Princess Anne High School in Virginia Beach, Virginia. She was named the All-Tidewater Girls Basketball Player of the Year her freshman and sophomore years.

During her junior year she averaged 16.8 points, 9.3 rebounds, 2.7 steals and 2.6 blocks and led Princess Anne High School to an undefeated season and a fourth consecutive Class 5 state championship. During the championship game against Menchville, she recorded a game-high 25 points, 15 rebounds and six blocks. Following the season she was named the Gatorade Virginia Player of the Year, and MaxPreps Virginia High School Girls Basketball Player of the Year. Dating back to 2023, she has helped Princess Anne to three state titles and a 71-game win streak. She was also named the All-Tidewater Girls Basketball Player of the Year for the third consecutive year. She became the only basketball player in Virginia High School League (VHSL) history to be named a state Player of the Year as a freshman, sophomore and junior.

=== Recruiting ===
Ojo is considered a five-star recruit, and the No. 6 player in the 2027 class by ESPN. In September 2026, she narrowed her recruiting list to North Carolina, Duke and Vanderbilt. On October 8, 2026, she committed to play college basketball at North Carolina.

== National team career ==
She represented the United States at the 2025 FIBA U16 Women's AmeriCup where she averaged 14.6 points, 4.6 rebounds, 2.8 assists and 3.2 steals per game and won a gold medal.

She represented the United States at the 2026 FIBA Under-17 Women's Basketball World Cup where she averaged 11.0 points, 5.9 rebounds, and 2.3 assists per game, and was named to the FIBA U17 World Cup All-Second Team. During the final against Spain she recorded a team-high 20 points, along with four rebounds, two steals and two blocks to help Team USA win a gold medal.
