= Tatianna Griffin =

American basketball player (born 2010)

Mater Dei
- Position: Guard

Personal information
- Born: February 13, 2010 (age 16)
- Listed height: 6 ft 0 in (1.83 m)

Career information
- High school: Ontario Christian (Ontario, California); Mater Dei High School (Santa Ana, California)
Medals
Women's basketball
Representing United States
FIBA Under-17 World Cup
Gold medal – first place	2026 Czech Republic	Team
FIBA Under-16 Women's AmeriCup
Gold medal – first place	2025 Mexico	Team

Tatianna Griffin (born February 13, 2010) is an American basketball player who attends Mater Dei High School. She is a five-star recruit and the No. 1 player in the 2028 class.

== High school career ==
Griffin began her career at Ontario Christian in Ontario, California. During her freshman year she averaged 17.8 points, 8.2 rebounds, 3.9 assists and 2.8 steals per game, and led her team in field-goal percentage (54%) and three-point percentage (41%). She scored 551 points, recorded 255 rebounds, and 122 assists, had 87 steals and blocked 22 shots. She appeared in 31 games, scored in double digits in all but one game, and had 20 or more points 12 times. Following the season she was named the MaxPreps National Freshman of the Year and to the MaxPreps Freshman All-America Team.

During her sophomore year she averaged 21.3 points, 7.9 rebounds, and 3.2 assists per game. She led Ontario Christian to a 34–2 record and the first CIF Open Division state title in school history. The Lady Knights were also awarded the mythical national championship by several outlets. Following the season she was named the MaxPreps National Sophomore of the Year and to the MaxPreps Sophomore All-America Team.

On June 8, 2026, she transferred to Mater Dei High School in Santa Ana, California.

=== Recruiting ===
Griffin is considered a five-star recruit, and the No. 1 player in the 2028 class by ESPN and 247Sports.

== National team career ==
She represented the United States at the 2025 FIBA U16 Women's AmeriCup where she averaged 13.3 points, 3.7 rebounds, 2.7 assists and 2.3 steals in six games off the bench and won a gold medal.

She represented the United States at the 2026 FIBA Under-17 Women's Basketball World Cup where she averaged 9.9 points, 4.4 rebounds and 2.4 assists per game and won a gold medal.
