= Caroline Bradley (basketball) =

American basketball player (born 2009)

No. 23 – Oak Grove
- Position: Center

Personal information
- Born: January 14, 2009 (age 17)
- Listed height: 6 ft 5 in (1.96 m)

Career information
- High school: Oak Grove (Oak Grove, Louisiana)
- College: LSU (commit)
Medals
Women's basketball
Representing United States
FIBA Under-17 World Cup
| Gold medal – first place | 2026 Czech Republic | Team |
FIBA Under-16 Women's AmeriCup
| Gold medal – first place | 2025 Mexico | Team |

Caroline Bradley (born January 14, 2009) is an American basketball player who attends Oak Grove High School. She is a five-star recruit and one of the top players in the 2027 class.

== High school career ==
Bradley attends Oak Grove High School in Oak Grove, Louisiana. During her sophomore year she averaged 21.8 points, 15.1 rebounds, 2.3 assists and 2.5 blocks per game. Following the season she was named the Gatorade Louisiana Player of the Year.

During her junior year she averaged 27.0 points, 16.9 rebounds, 2.4 assists, 3.4 blocks and 1.4 steals per game. Following the season she was named the Louisiana Sports Writers Association (LSWA) Class 2A Most Outstanding Player and Gatorade Louisiana Player of the Year for the second consecutive year. She became the sixth girls basketball player in Louisiana history to win Gatorade Player of the Year honors in multiple seasons, following Seimone Augustus (2001–02), Whitney Jones (2005–06), Theresa Plaisance (2009–10), Cara Ursin (2015–17) and Mikaylah Williams (2022–23). She was also named the MaxPreps Louisiana High School Girls Basketball Player of the Year. In her first season playing varsity softball she earned all-state honors after hitting .419 with 13 home runs and 34 RBIs.

=== Recruiting ===
Bradley is considered a five-star recruit, and the No. 1 center in the 2027 class. On April 6, 2026, she committed to play college basketball at LSU.

== National team career ==
In June 2025, Bradley was selected to represent the United States at the 2025 FIBA U16 Women's AmeriCup. During the tournament she averaged 7.5 points and a team-high 8.3 rebounds per game and won a gold medal.

In June 2026, she was selected to represent the United States at the 2026 FIBA Under-17 Women's Basketball World Cup. During the tournament she averaged 7.2 points and 6.8 rebounds per game and won a gold medal.
