= Eve Long =

American basketball player (born 2009)

No. 23 – Olathe South Falcons
- Position: Forward

Personal information
- Born: 24 January 2009 (age 17)
- Listed height: 6 ft 3 in (1.91 m)

Career information
- High school: Olathe South (Olathe, Kansas)
- College: Notre Dame (commit)
Medals
Representing the United States
Women's basketball
FIBA Under-17 World Cup
Gold medal – first place	2026 Czech Republic	Team
FIBA Under-16 Women's AmeriCup
Gold medal – first place	2025 Mexico	Team

Eve Long (born January 24, 2009) is an American high school basketball player who attends Olathe South High School in Olathe, Kansas. She is a five-star recruit and one of the top-ranked players in the 2027 class.

== Early life ==
Eve Long was born on January 24, 2009. She was separated from her two older brothers in the foster care system during her youth. The three were reunited when they were adopted by Benjamin and Nicole Long, settling in Olathe, Kansas. Long began playing basketball at an early age, though she considered quitting in the third or fourth grade, and said she fell in love with the sport in the sixth grade. She recalled: "At the end of the day, my dad always pushed me".

Long attends Olathe South High School in Olathe, Kansas, where she plays basketball for the Falcons. As a freshman, she was listed as a 6 ft 2 in (1.88 m) forward. Long averaged 16.0 points and 10.5 rebounds per game that season. She earned second-team Class 6A all-state honors from the Kansas Basketball Coaches Association (KBCA) and third-team Class 6A all-state honors from The Wichita Eagle. As a sophomore, Long averaged 22.7 points and 11 rebounds per game. She earned first-team Class 6A all-state honors from the KBCA and second-team all-class all-state honors from The Wichita Eagle.

As a junior, Long averaged 32.1 points and 9.8 rebounds per game, guiding the Falcons to their third straight Class 6A state tournament appearance. She was named the Kansas Gatorade Player of the Year, the MaxPreps Kansas Player of the Year, and The Wichita Eagle Class 6A Player of the Year. In January 2026, Long was named the MVP of the Sophie Cunningham Classic after setting the event's scoring record with 44 points, which also set her school's single-game scoring record, for girls and boys. Later that month, she scored her 1,000th career point in a game against Shawnee Mission East High School. Long also set the scoring record at the McPherson Mid-America Classic with 43 points in the semifinals against Shawnee Mission South High School, breaking the 26-year record held by Laurie Koehn, before posting 31 points and 14 rebounds in the championship game, a 63–51 win over Manhattan High School.

Outside of school, Long played with Southwest Select on the Adidas 3SSB circuit, once scoring 52 points in a game.

=== Recruiting ===
Long is a consensus top-10 prospect and one of the top recruits in the class of 2027; she is rated as a five-star recruit by ESPN and Rivals.com, and a four-star recruit by 247Sports. She received her first college offers from Oklahoma whe she was in the eighth grade. According to her father, Long received up to 60 offers in total. On December 14, 2025, she announced her top five choices: Duke, Kansas, Notre Dame, UConn, and UCLA. On May 20, 2026, Long verbally committed to playing college basketball at Notre Dame under head coach Niele Ivey. "Notre Dame felt like home from the moment I stepped on campus," she said. "The campus life, strong academics, faith-centered environment and genuine connections with the team made it clear this was where I'm meant to be."

== National team career ==
Long represented the United States at the 2025 FIBA U16 Women's AmeriCup and won a gold medal. She averaged 11.8 points and four rebounds per game, earning All-Star Five honors.

== Personal life ==
Long is a Christian and has seven siblings. Born in the United States, she is of Nigerian descent.

In high school, Long volunteered at Vacation Bible School and as a youth basketball coach.
